= 1969 in China =

- Decades: 1940s; 1950s; 1960s; 1970s; 1980s
- See also: Other events of 1969; History of China • Timeline • Years

Events from the year 1969 in China.

== Incumbents ==
- Chairman of the Chinese Communist Party – Mao Zedong
- President of the People's Republic of China – vacant
- Premier of the People's Republic of China – Zhou Enlai
- Chairman of the National People's Congress – Zhu De
- Vice President of the People's Republic of China – Soong Ching-ling and Dong Biwu
- First Vice Premier of the People's Republic of China – Lin Biao

=== Governors ===
- Governor of Anhui Province – Li Desheng
- Governor of Fujian Province – Han Xianchu
- Governor of Gansu Province – Xian Henghan
- Governor of Guangdong Province – Huang Yongsheng (until June), Liu Xingyuan (starting June)
- Governor of Guizhou Province – Ma Li
- Governor of Hebei Province – Li Xuefeng
- Governor of Heilongjiang Province – Pan Fusheng
- Governor of Henan Province – Liu Jianxun
- Governor of Hubei Province – Zeng Siyu
- Governor of Hunan Province – Li Yuan
- Governor of Jiangsu Province – Xu Shiyou
- Governor of Jiangxi Province – Cheng Shiqing
- Governor of Jilin Province – Wang Huaixiang
- Governor of Liaoning Province – Chen Xilian
- Governor of Qinghai Province – Liu Xianquan
- Governor of Shaanxi Province – Li Ruishan
- Governor of Shandong Province – Wang Xiaoyu (until unknown)
- Governor of Shanxi Province – Liu Geping
- Governor of Sichuan Province – Zhang Guohua
- Governor of Yunnan Province – Tan Furen
- Governor of Zhejiang Province – Nan Ping

== Events ==
- 9th National Congress of the Chinese Communist Party
- 9th Politburo of the Chinese Communist Party
- 1969 Yangjiang earthquake
- 1969 Bohai earthquake
- Sino-Soviet border conflict
- Tielieketi incident
- July 10 to 16 – According to Chinese government official confirmed report, a torrential massive heavy rain and debris flow, maximum nearly 600 to 1,000 millimeters precipitation amount, massive flood in Jianghan Plain, Anhui Province, Yangtze river, total 1,603 persons were human relative fatalities.
- September (unknown date) – Qingdao Second Radio Electronic, as predecessor for Hisense was founded in Shandong Province.

== Births ==
- Ai Jing, Chinese singer
- Sheng Zhimin
- Luo Xi (synchronised swimmer)
- Tang Xuezhong
- Lü Siqing
- Zhang Bin (pentathlete)
- Li Wenkai

== Deaths ==
- January 30 — Li Zongren, prominent warlord from Guangxi and 1st Vice President of the Republic of China (b. 1891)
- February 3 — Xiong Qinglai, mathematician (b. 1893)
- February 23 — Carsun Chang, philosopher, public intellectual and social democratic politician (b. 1887)
- March 17 — Shu Xiuwen, film and stage actress (b. 1915)
- March 24 — Wu Dingliang, anthropologist and educator (b. 1893)
- April 6 — Zhang Zhizhong, military commander and politician (b. 1890)
- April 24 – Guo Qiru, Xiangsheng performer (b. 1900)
- May 16 — Doe Ching, film director and screenwriter (b. 1915)
- May 17 — Zhang Bojun, former Vice Chairman of the Chinese People's Political Consultative Conference (b. 1895)
- June 3 — Xu Guangda, general in the People's Liberation Army (b. 1908)
- June 9 — He Long, Marshal of the People's Republic of China (b. 1896)
- July 30
  - Chen Shaokuan, Fleet Admiral (b. 1889)
  - Zhang Zongsui, physicist and academician (b. 1915)
- August 8 — Shangguan Yunxiang, general in the National Revolutionary Army (b. 1895)
- September 16 — Yin Haiguang, author, educator and philosopher (b. 1919)
- October 7 — Chen Yinke, historian, linguist, orientalist, politician and writer (b. 1890)
- October 11 — Wu Han, historian and politician (b. 1909)
- November 12 — Liu Shaoqi, 2nd President of China (b. 1898)
- November 30 — Tao Zhu, Member of the Politburo Standing Committee of the Chinese Communist Party (b. 1908)

=== Date unknown ===
- Liu Luyin, politician (b. 1894)

== See also ==
- 1969 in Chinese film
