= 1983 in China =

- Decades: 1960s; 1970s; 1980s; 1990s; 2000s
- See also: Other events of 1983; History of China • Timeline • Years

Events from the year 1983 in China.

== Incumbents ==
- General Secretary of the Chinese Communist Party - Hu Yaobang
- Chairman of the National Congress – Ye Jianying (head of state, until June 18)
- President – Li Xiannian (starting June 18)
- Premier – Zhao Ziyang
- Chairman of the Chinese People's Political Consultative Conference – Deng Xiaoping (until June), Deng Yingchao (starting June)
- Vice President – Ulanhu (starting 18 June)
- First Vice Premier – Wan Li

=== Governors ===
- Governor of Anhui Province – Zhou Zijian then Wang Yuzhao
- Governor of Fujian Province – Ma Xingyuan then Hu Ping
- Governor of Gansu Province – Li Dengying then Chen Guangyi
- Governor of Guangdong Province – Liu Tianfu then Liang Lingguang
- Governor of Guizhou Province – Su Gang then Wang Zhaowen
- Governor of Hebei Province – Liu Bingyan then Zhang Shuguang
- Governor of Heilongjiang Province – Chen Lei
- Governor of Henan Province – Yu Mingtao (acting) then He Zhukang
- Governor of Hubei Province – Han Ningfu then Huang Zhizhen
- Governor of Hunan Province – Sun Guozhi then Liu Zheng
- Governor of Jiangsu Province – Han Peixin then Gu Xiulian
- Governor of Jiangxi Province – Zhao Zengyi
- Governor of Jilin Province – Zhang Gensheng then Zhao Xiu
- Governor of Liaoning Province – Quan Shuren (starting April)
- Governor of Qinghai Province – Huang Jingbo
- Governor of Shaanxi Province – Yu Mingtao (until April), Li Qingwei (starting April)
- Governor of Shandong Province – Liang Buting
- Governor of Shanxi Province – Luo Guibo then Wang Senhao
- Governor of Sichuan Province – Lu Dadong (until April)/Yang Xizong
- Governor of Yunnan Province – Liu Minghui (until April), Pu Chaozhu (starting April)
- Governor of Zhejiang Province – Li Fengping then Xue Ju

== Events ==
- Anti-Spiritual Pollution Campaign
- Hu Na Diplomatic incident
- 1983 Guilin Airport collision
- Weightlifting at the 1983 National Games of China
- 1983 Guangdong–Hong Kong Cup
- 3rd Golden Rooster Awards
- 6th National People's Congress began
- Outlaws of the Marsh (TV series) debuted
- CCTV New Year's Gala debuted
- July 31 – A heavy massive torrential rain and flood swept hit in Ankang, Shaanxi Province, at least 870 persons were perished, according to China Red Cross official confirmed report.
- China began to develop its national laboratories in 1983, with the first being the National Synchrotron Radiation Laboratory at China University of Science and Technology in Hefei. National laboratories were intended to be flagship facilities with the newest technology.

== Births ==
- April 5 – Zhong Jinyu
- May 15 – Yang Jinghui
- July 17 – Joker Xue, singer-songwriter
- July 23 – Jiao Fengbo
- September 6 – Sun Dongmei
- November 6 – Bao Yingying
- November 9 – Wang Qingyun (王青雲), ladies singles figure skater

== Deaths ==
- January 6
  - Yang Yong, general (b. 1913)
  - Xu Liqing, lieutenant general (b. 1910)
- January 18 — Shi Ruwei, physicist (b. 1901)
- February 4 — Xiao San, poet and translator (b. 1896)
- March 25 — Liu Changchun, sprinter (b. 1909)
- April 2 — Zhang Daqian, artist (b. 1899)
- April 3 — Sun Fucheng, football player and coach (b. 1927)
- April 22 — Lin Qiaozhi, obstetrician and gynecologist (b. 1901)
- April 26 — Huang Yongsheng, general (b. 1910)
- June 10 — Liao Chengzhi, politician (b. 1908)
- July 7 — Alexander Fu Sheng, Hong Kong martial arts actor (b. 1954)
- July 20 — Yang Chongrui, obstetrician (b. 1891)
- September 22 — Qiao Guanhua, 4th Minister of Foreign Affairs of China (b. 1913)
- September 30 — Tan Zhenlin, 1st Secretary of the Zhejiang Provincial Committee of the Chinese Communist Party (b. 1902)
- October 31 — Wu Xuezhou, chemist (b. 1902)
- November 6 — Liang Zongdai, poet and translator (b. 1903)
- November 28 — Peng Shuzhi, early leader of the Chinese Communist Party (b. 1895)
- December 3 — Wang Guosong, electrical engineer (b. 1902)

== See also ==
- 1983 in Chinese film
