= 1987 in China =

- Decades: 1960s; 1970s; 1980s; 1990s; 2000s
- See also: Other events of 1987; History of China • Timeline • Years

Events from the year 1987 in China.

== Incumbents ==
- General Secretary of the Chinese Communist Party: Hu Yaobang
- President: Li Xiannian
- Premier: Zhao Ziyang
- Chairman: Deng Yingchao
- Vice President: Ulanhu
- Vice Premier: Wan Li

=== Governors ===
- Governor of Anhui Province – Wang Yuzhao then Lu Rongjing
- Governor of Fujian Province – Hu Ping then Wang Zhaoguo
- Governor of Gansu Province – Chen Guangyi then Jia Zhijie
- Governor of Guangdong Province – Ye Xuanping
- Governor of Guizhou Province – Wang Zhaowen
- Governor of Hebei Province – Xie Feng then Yue Qifeng
- Governor of Heilongjiang Province – Hou Jie
- Governor of Henan Province – He Zhukang then Cheng Weigao
- Governor of Hubei Province – Guo Zhenqian
- Governor of Hunan Province – Xiong Qingquan
- Governor of Jiangsu Province – Gu Xiulian
- Governor of Jiangxi Province – Wu Guanzheng
- Governor of Jilin Province – Gao Dezhan then He Zhukang
- Governor of Liaoning Province – Li Changchun
- Governor of Qinghai Province – Song Ruixiang then Jin Jipeng
- Governor of Shaanxi Province – Zhang Boxing then Hou Zongbin
- Governor of Shandong Province – Li Chang'an then Jiang Chunyun
- Governor of Shanxi Province – Wang Senhao
- Governor of Sichuan Province – Jiang Minkuan (until January), Zhang Haoruo (starting February)
- Governor of Yunnan Province – Li Jiating
- Governor of Zhejiang Province – Xue Ju (until January), Shen Zulun (starting February)

== Events ==
- 1987 Sino-Indian skirmish
- 7th Golden Rooster Awards
- Black Dragon Fire
- 13th Politburo of the Chinese Communist Party
- 13th National Congress of the Chinese Communist Party
- Joint Declaration on the Question of Macau
- Huawei was founded in Shenzhen.
- Hangzhou Wahaha Group was founded.
- September 25 – China CITIC Bank was founded.

== Births ==
- January 6 – Zhang Lin, swimmer
- March 27 – Yuan Jing, sport shooter
- April 8 – Tianwa Yang, classical violinist
- April 22 – Lou Yue, ice hockey player
- May 4 – Li Yifeng, actor
- August 20 – Hao Jialu, fencer
- December 15 – Luo Xi, synchronised swimmer

== Deaths ==
- January 17 — Gu Zhutong, Nationalist general (b. 1893)
- April 2 — Wang Renmei, actress and singer (b. 1914)
- May 20 — Ma Sicong, violinist and composer (b. 1912)
- June 22 — Mao Bangchu, Nationalist high-ranking military officer (b. 1904)
- June 30 — Li Hanhun, Nationalist general (b. 1895)
- August 8 — Zhang Xiaoqian, gastroenterologist (b. 1897)
- August 21 — Li Fang-Kuei, linguist (b. 1902)
- August 27 — Bai Wei, revolutionary playwright, poet and fiction writer (b. 1894)
- October 21 — He Yingqin, Nationalist general (b. 1890)
- November 3 — Liang Shih-chiu, educator, writer, translator, literary theorist and lexicographer (b. 1903)

== See also ==
- Timeline of Chinese history
- 1987 in Chinese film
