= 1949 in China =

- Decades: 1920s; 1930s; 1940s; 1950s; 1960s
- See also: Other events of 1949; History of China • Timeline • Years

Events in the year 1949 in China.

== Incumbents ==
Republic of China:

- President: Chiang Kai-shek (-January 21), Li Zongren (January 21-)
- Premiers: Sun Fo, He Yingqin, Yan Xishan

People's Republic of China:

- Chairman of the Chinese Communist Party: Mao Zedong
- Chairman of the Government: Mao Zedong
- Premier: Zhou Enlai

== Events ==
=== January ===
- January 21 — Chiang Kai-shek resigns from the presidency in a "temporary absence". Vice President Li Zongren was named as the successor

=== April ===
- April 23 — Communists capture the KMT's capital, Nanjing

=== June ===
- the Communist Party organised a "Chinese People's Political Consultative Conference" (CPPCC) to prepare for the establishment of a "New Democracy" regime to replace the Kuomintang-dominated Republic of China government

=== July ===
- Tropical storm Irma kills 1,600 people and destroys more than 63,000 houses in Shanghai, the worst typhoon on record in the city.

=== September ===
- September 21 — The first meeting of the CPPCC, which was attended by the Communist Party along with eight aligned parties
- September 27 — Establishment of the Flag of the People's Republic of China (simplified Chinese: 中华人民共和国国旗; traditional Chinese: 中華人民共和國國旗; pinyin: Zhōnghuá Rénmín Gònghéguó guóqí), a red field charged in the canton (upper corner nearest the flagpole) with five golden stars.

=== October ===
- October 1 — The People's Republic of China is officially proclaimed in Beijing
- October 17 — Chinese communist troops take Guangzhou.
- October 25–27 — Battle of Guningtou in Kinmen, Fujian
- October 27 — Chinese communist troops fail to take Kinmen in the Battle of Kuningtou; their advance towards Taiwan is halted.

=== December ===
- December 8 — The government of the Republic of China finishes its evacuation to Taiwan, and declares Taipei its temporary capital city.
- December 17 — Burma recognizes the People's Republic of China.
- December 30 — India recognizes the People's Republic of China.

== Births ==
=== January ===
- January 1 — Paula Tsui, Hong Kong Cantopop singer
- January 5 — Zhang Ruimin, founder of Haier Group
- January 21 — Wan Sha Lang, Taiwanese singer and film actor (d. 2023)
- Chang Wanquan, 11th Minister of National Defense of China

=== February ===
- February 13 — Yeh Chu-lan, Taiwanese politician

=== March ===
- March 27 — Michael Kwan, Hong Kong Cantopop singer

=== April ===
- April 4 — Shing-Tung Yau, Chinese-American mathematician
- April 5 — Sheng Guangzu, last Minister of Railways of China
- April 7 — Bennett Pang, Hong Kong musician, singer and actor

=== May ===
- May 21 — Angela Pan, Hong Kong actress
- May 22 — Wu Kwok Hung, Hong Kong football player (d. 2015)

=== June ===
- June 1 — Mu Tiezhu, prominent basketball player and coach (d. 2008)
- June 23 — Charles Ho, Hong Kong pro-Beijing businessman

=== July ===
- July 3 — Bo Xilai, politician
- July 20 — Nina Paw, Hong Kong actress
- July 22 — Stephen Shiu, Taiwan-based Hong Kong media personality

=== August ===
- August 8 — Meng Xuenong, 18th Governor of Shanxi

=== September ===
- September 19 — Chi Shangbin, football player and coach (d. 2021)

=== October ===
- October 1 — Li Congjun, former President of Xinhua News Agency
- October 14 — Damian Lau, Hong Kong film and television actor

=== November ===
- November 12 — Wang Fuli, actress

=== December ===
- December 3 — Lu Yao, novelist (d. 1992)
- December 8 — Su Shao-lien, Taiwanese poet
- December 22 — Ching Cheong, journalist

== Deaths ==
=== January ===
- January 9 — Wang Maozu, educator and philosopher (b. 1891)
- January 10 — Qiu Qingquan, Nationalist general (b. 1902)
- January 15 — Lu Zhengxiang, diplomat (b. 1871)

=== February ===
- February 11 — Dai Jitao, journalist (b. 1891)
- Tang Yulin, general in the Northeastern Army (b. 1871)

=== March ===
- March 30 — Zaixun, Manchu noble (b. 1885)

=== April ===
- April 14 — Hu Zhengzhi, newspaper publisher (b. 1889)
- April 24 — Liang Huazhi, Nationalist official (b. 1906)

=== May ===
- May 7 — Li Bai, communist spy (b. 1910)
- May 25 — Wang Jingzhai, Muslim scholar (b. 1880)

=== July ===
- Ren Kainan, educator (b. 1884)

=== August ===
- August 27 — Politicians who died in the Transbaikal plane crash
  - Ehmetjan Qasim, Uyghur revolutionary and statesman (b. 1914)
  - Abdulkerim Abbas, Uyghur politician (b. 1921)
  - Ishaq Beg Munonov, ethnic Kyrgyz political leader (b. 1902)
  - Dalelkhan Sugirbayev, ethnic Kazakh political leader (b. 1906)
  - Luo Zhi, revolutionary activist and leader in Xinjiang (b. 1915)
- August 31 — Chan Chak, Admiral of the Republic of China Navy (b. 1894)

=== September ===
- September 6 — Yang Hucheng, general (b. 1893)

=== October ===
- October 2 — Wu Zanzhou, military officer and politician (b. 1885)
- October 17 — Liu Wencai, landlord (b. 1887)

=== November ===
- November 2 — Chen Shufan, general of the Anhui Clique (b. 1885)
- November 20 — Jiang Zhuyun, communist resistance fighter (b. 1920)
- November 26 — Hu Ruoyu, Governor of Yunnan (b. 1894)

=== Dates unknown ===
- Li Shaogeng, politician (b. 1896)
- Qi Yaolin, politician (b. 1862)

== See also ==
- 1949 in Chinese film
