= 1990 in China =

- Decades: 1970s; 1980s; 1990s; 2000s; 2010s
- See also: Other events of 1990; History of China • Timeline • Years

The following lists events in the year 1990 in China.

== Incumbents ==
- General Secretary of the Communist Party: Jiang Zemin
- President: Yang Shangkun
- Premier: Li Peng
- Vice President: Wang Zhen
- Vice Premier: Yao Yilin

=== Governors ===
- Governor of Anhui Province — Fu Xishou
- Governor of Fujian Province — Wang Zhaoguo then Jia Qinglin
- Governor of Gansu Province — Jia Zhijie
- Governor of Guangdong Province — Ye Xuanping
- Governor of Guizhou Province — Wang Zhaowen
- Governor of Hainan Province — Liu Jianfeng
- Governor of Hebei Province — Yue Qifeng then Cheng Weigao
- Governor of Heilongjiang Province — Shao Qihui
- Governor of Henan Province — Cheng Weigao then Li Changchun
- Governor of Hubei Province — Guo Zhenqian then Guo Shuyan
- Governor of Hunan Province — Chen Bangzhu
- Governor of Jiangsu Province — Chen Huanyou
- Governor of Jiangxi Province — Wu Guanzheng
- Governor of Jilin Province — Wang Zhongyu
- Governor of Liaoning Province — Li Changchun (until July), Yue Qifeng (starting July)
- Governor of Qinghai Province — Jin Jipeng
- Governor of Shaanxi Province — Hou Zongbin (until March), Bai Qingcai (starting March)
- Governor of Shandong Province — Zhao Zhihao
- Governor of Shanxi Province — Wang Senhao
- Governor of Sichuan Province — Zhang Haoruo
- Governor of Yunnan Province — Li Jiating
- Governor of Zhejiang Province — Shen Zulun (until November), Ge Hongsheng (starting November)

== Events ==
- September 22 — October 7: 1990 Asian Games in Beijing.
- October 2: 1990 Guangzhou Baiyun airport collisions, two commercial planes crashed, a total of 128 people died, 53 persons were hurt, 97 persons survived in Guangdong, according to the China Civil Aviation official confirmed report.
- Unknown date: Li-Ning sports goods company was founded.

== Births ==
- January 8 - Xu Xin, table tennis player.
- February 7 — Hua Chenyu, rock singer and songwriter
- February 9 — Ma Ke, actor
- February 13 — Gyaincain Norbu, 11th Panchen Lama
- March - Zhang Nan
- March 2 — Adderly Fong, Hong Kong Chinese racing driver
- April 20 — Lu Han, singer, actor and dancer
- May 31 - Tan Songyun, actress
- June 20 - Ding Ning, table tennis player.
- June 28 — Chen Xuedong, actor and singer
- August 16 - Wu Jinyan, actress
- September 27 - Li Qin, actress
- September - Li Yitong, actress
- October 1 – Chen Minyi, Paralympic archer

== Deaths ==
- January 11 — Cai Xiao, Taiwan-born military officer and politician (b. 1919)
- February 4 — Gao Yinxian, linguist and writer (b. 1902)
- February 8 — Xu Deheng, politician, scholar and educator (b. 1890)
- May 2 — Shi Guangnan, composer (b. 1940)
- May 9 — Lü Wei, diver (b. 1966)
- May 22 — Ling Shuhua, modernist writer and painter (b. 1900)
- July 11 — Sun Yu, film director (b. 1900)
- July 18 — Lap-Ban Chan, Hong Kong actress (b. 1911)
- July 29 — Cai Qiao, physiologist and physician (b. 1897)
- August 5 — Zhou Keqin, writer (b. 1937)
- August 14
  - Sun Lianzhong, nationalist general (b. 1893)
  - Liu Xingyuan, lieutenant general (b. 1908)
- August 30 — Ch'ien Mu, historian and philosopher (b. 1895)
- September 11 — Cai Chang, 1st leader of the All-China Women's Federation (b. 1900)
- September 21 — Xu Xiangqian, 4th Minister of National Defense (b. 1901)
- October 15 — Yu Pingbo, essayist, poet, historian, redologist and literary critic (b. 1900)
- October 30 — Kwok Tak-seng, Hong Kong businessman and founder of Sun Hung Kai Properties (b. 1911)
- November 15 — Cheng Shicai, lieutenant general (b. 1912)
- November 18 — Dai Chuanzeng, nuclear physicist (b. 1921)
- November 19 — Sun Li-jen, nationalist general (b. 1900)
- November 26 — Feng Youlan, philosopher, historian and writer (b. 1895)
- December 14 — Zhang Qun, Nationalist politician (b. 1889)
- December 15 — Chen Zhifang, diplomat (b. 1906)

== See also ==
- 1990 in Chinese film
