= 1982 in China =

- Decades: 1960s; 1970s; 1980s; 1990s; 2000s
- See also: Other events of 1982; History of China • Timeline • Years

Events from the year 1982 in China.

== Incumbents ==
- Chairman of the Chinese Communist Party – Hu Yaobang (until September 12)
- General Secretary of the Chinese Communist Party – Hu Yaobang
- Chairman of the National Congress – Ye Jianying (head of state)
- Premier – Zhao Ziyang
- Chairman of the Chinese People's Political Consultative Conference – Deng Xiaoping
- First Vice Premier – Wan Li

=== Governors ===
- Governor of Anhui Province – Zhou Zijian
- Governor of Fujian Province – Ma Xingyuan
- Governor of Gansu Province – Li Dengying
- Governor of Guangdong Province – Liu Tianfu
- Governor of Guizhou Province – Su Gang
- Governor of Hebei Province – Li Erzhong then Liu Bingyan
- Governor of Heilongjiang Province – Chen Lei
- Governor of Henan Province – Dai Suli (acting) then Yu Mingtao (acting)
- Governor of Hubei Province – Han Ningfu
- Governor of Hunan Province – Sun Guozhi
- Governor of Jiangsu Province – Hui Yuyu then Han Peixin
- Governor of Jiangxi Province – Bai Dongcai then Zhao Zengyi
- Governor of Jilin Province – Yu Ke then Zhang Gensheng
- Governor of Liaoning Province – Chen Puru (until April)
- Governor of Qinghai Province – Zhang Guosheng then Huang Jingbo
- Governor of Shaanxi Province – Yu Mingtao
- Governor of Shandong Province – Su Yiran then Liang Buting
- Governor of Shanxi Province – Luo Guibo
- Governor of Sichuan Province – Lu Dadong/Yang Xizong (starting December)
- Governor of Yunnan Province – Liu Minghui
- Governor of Zhejiang Province – Li Fengping

== Events ==
- July 2 – Qidong (meteorite) fell to earth
- 2nd Golden Rooster Awards
- 12th Politburo of the Chinese Communist Party
- Third National Population Census of the People's Republic of China
- Three Communiqués
- May 9 to 14 – 1982 Bei River flood, mainly occur disaster area in Shaoguan, Qingyuan, Zhaoqing and other area of Guangdong Province, kill 493 persons an overall, according to China Red Cross official confirmed report.
- In December 1982, the Science and Technology Leading Small Group was established with Zhao Ziyang as its head. This body was tasked with "unified leadership over economic planning, research and development, and scientific and technical manpower training and allocation."

== Births ==
- April 3 – Liang Lei, Olympic wrestler
- April 14 – Zhao Shengbo, Olympic sports shooter
- May 5 – Jia Dandan, Olympic ice hockey player
- June 14 – Lang Lang, pianist
- July 27 – Tang Li, Go player
- October 9 – Nian Yun, Olympic swimmer

== Deaths ==
- January 18 — Huang Xianfan, historian, ethnologist and educator (b. 1899)
- February 25 — Yuen Ren Chao, linguist, educator, scholar, poet and composer (b. 1892)
- February 26 — Zhang Boju, collector, painter, calligrapher, poet and Peking Opera researcher (b. 1898)
- March 5 — Liu Lanbo, communist revolutionary and politician (b. 1904)
- April 26 — Sha Qianli, former Vice Chairman of the Chinese People's Political Consultative Conference (b. 1901)
- May 10 — Ma Yinchu, economist, former President of Peking University and the father of family planning in China (b. 1882)
- May 18 — Ji Yufeng, chemist (b. 1899)
- July 7 — Jin Shan, actor and director (b. 1911) no
- July 23 — Huang Ziqing, chemist (b. 1900)
- August 22 — Wei Ming, former President of East China University of Political Science and Law (b. 1908)
- September 18 — Pei Wenzhong, paleontologist, archaeologist and anthropologist (b. 1904)
- November 3 — Mok Kwai-lan, martial artist and fourth spouse of Lingnan martial arts grandmaster Wong Fei-hung (b. 1892)
- December 23 — Yang Tingbao, architect (b. 1901)

== See also ==
- 1982 in Chinese film
