= 1981 in China =

- Decades: 1960s; 1970s; 1980s; 1990s; 2000s
- See also: Other events of 1981; History of China • Timeline • Years

Events from the year 1981 in China.

== Incumbents ==
- Chairman of the Chinese Communist Party – Hua Guofeng / Hu Yaobang
- Chairman of the Congress – Ye Jianying (head of state)
- Premier – Zhao Ziyang
- Chairman of the Chinese People's Political Consultative Conference – Deng Xiaoping
- Vice Premier of China – Wan Li

=== Governors ===
- Governor of Anhui Province – Zhang Jingfu then Zhou Zijian
- Governor of Fujian Province – Ma Xingyuan
- Governor of Gansu Province – Feng Jixin then Li Dengying
- Governor of Guangdong Province – Xi Zhongxun then Liu Tianfu
- Governor of Guizhou Province – Su Gang
- Governor of Hebei Province – Li Erzhong
- Governor of Heilongjiang Province – Chen Lei
- Governor of Henan Province – Liu Jie then Dai Suli
- Governor of Hubei Province – Han Ningfu
- Governor of Hunan Province – Sun Guozhi
- Governor of Jiangsu Province – Hui Yuyu
- Governor of Jiangxi Province – Bai Dongcai
- Governor of Jilin Province – Yu Ke
- Governor of Liaoning Province – Chen Puru
- Governor of Qinghai Province – Zhang Guosheng
- Governor of Shaanxi Province – Yu Mingtao
- Governor of Shandong Province – Su Yiran
- Governor of Shanxi Province – Luo Guibo
- Governor of Sichuan Province – Lu Dadong
- Governor of Yunnan Province – Liu Minghui
- Governor of Zhejiang Province – Li Fengping

== Events ==
1981 was the year of the rooster in the Chinese Zodiac.

- January 24 - Dawu earthquake
- May 22 - 1st Golden Rooster Awards
- July 9 - Chengdu-Kunming rail crash
- July 22 - Yangquan theatre bombing
- Unknown date – TTK Home Appliance, as predecessor of TCL Technology was founded in Guangdong Province.

== Establishments ==
- National Population and Family Planning Commission
- Beijing Marathon
- Capital Museum
- China Daily
- Chongqing Broadcasting Group
- Jinling Hotel
- Golden Rooster Awards
- Flying Apsaras Awards
- Duzhe
- TCL Corporation
- Soong Ching-ling Memorial Residence (Shanghai)
- Shantou Special Economic Zone

== Births ==
- January 2 - Zhang Juanjuan, archer
- January 18 - Song Lun, figure skater
- February 3 - Huang Zhiyi, footballer
- April 4 - Zhang Lei, racing cyclist
- April 6 - Wang Di, football referee
- April 19 - Zhang Yalin, footballer (d. 2010)
- August 29 - Zeng Shaoxuan, tennis player
- September 23 - Zhang Ai, softball player
- November 30 - Luo Jin, actor and singer.
- Liu Jiayin, independent filmmaker

== Deaths ==
- January 6 — Cao Juru, 2nd Governor of the People's Bank of China (b. 1901)
- March 9 — Cai Xitao, botanist (b. 1911)
- March 27 — Mao Dun, novelist, essayist, journalist, playwright, literary and cultural critic (b. 1896)
- April 11 — Liu Yuzhang, prominent nationalist general (b. 1903)
- April 21 — Wang Shijie, Kuomintang politician and scholar (b. 1891)
- April 30 — Zhu Yunshan, former Vice Chairman of the Chinese People's Political Consultative Conference (b. 1887)
- May 7 — Du Yuming, Kuomintang field commander (b. 1904)
- May 29 — Soong Ching-ling, Honorary Chairwoman of China (b. 1893)
- June 19 — Chen Qihan, general in the People's Liberation Army (b. 1897)
- July 25 — Hu Lancheng, writer and politician (b. 1906)
- August 22 — Lü Wencheng, composer and musician (b. 1898)
- August 25 — Fu Qiutao, politician and senior general in the People's Liberation Army (b. 1907)
- December 16 — Zhang Dingcheng, 2nd Procurator-General of the Supreme People's Procuratorate (b. 1898)
- December 27 — Yu Hanmou, colonel general in the National Revolutionary Army (b. 1896)

=== Dates unknown ===
- Wang Shujin, martial artist, practitioner of baguazhang, taijiquan and xingyiquan (b. 1904)
- Jiang Yukun, Tai chi master (b. 1913)

== See also ==
- 1981 in Chinese film
