= 1968 in China =

- Decades: 1940s; 1950s; 1960s; 1970s; 1980s
- See also: Other events of 1968; History of China • Timeline • Years

Events from the year 1968 in China.

== Incumbents ==
- Chairman of the Chinese Communist Party — Mao Zedong
- President of the People's Republic of China — vacant
- Premier of the People's Republic of China — Zhou Enlai
- Chairman of the National People's Congress — Zhu De
- Vice President of the People's Republic of China — Soong Ching-ling and Dong Biwu
- First Vice Premier of the People's Republic of China — Lin Biao

=== Governors ===
- Governor of Anhui Province – Li Desheng
- Governor of Fujian Province – Han Xianchu
- Governor of Gansu Province – Xian Henghan
- Governor of Guangdong Province – Huang Yongsheng
- Governor of Guizhou Province – Ma Li
- Governor of Hebei Province – Li Xuefeng
- Governor of Heilongjiang Province – Pan Fusheng
- Governor of Henan Province – Liu Jianxun
- Governor of Hubei Province – Zhang Tixue (until February), Zeng Siyu (from February onwards)
- Governor of Hunan Province – Li Yuan
- Governor of Jiangsu Province – Xu Shiyou
- Governor of Jiangxi Province – Cheng Shiqing
- Governor of Jilin Province – Wang Huaixiang
- Governor of Liaoning Province – Chen Xilian
- Governor of Qinghai Province – Liu Xianquan
- Governor of Shaanxi Province – Li Qiming (until April), Li Ruishan (from April onwards)
- Governor of Shandong Province – Wang Xiaoyu
- Governor of Shanxi Province – Liu Geping
- Governor of Sichuan Province – Zhang Guohua
- Governor of Yunnan Province – Li Chengfang (until August 10), Tan Furen (from August 10 onwards)
- Governor of Zhejiang Province – Nan Ping

== Events ==
- Cleansing the Class Ranks
- Shaoyang County Massacre
- Mango cult
- Opening of the Nanjing Yangtze River Bridge
- Ruijin Massacre

== Births ==
- August 20 — Bai Yansong, CCTV news commentator, anchor and journalist

== Deaths ==
- March 3 — Xu Guangping, writer, politician and social activist (b. 1898)
- April 5 — Cheng Qian, army officer and politician (b. 1882)
- April 7 — Chen Changjie, Nationalist general (b. 1892)
- April 8 — Yan Fengying, Huangmei opera artist (b. 1930)
- April 16 — Fu Chi Fong, international table tennis player (b. 1923)
- April 25 — Cai Tingkai, general (b. 1892)
- May 8 — Liu Peishan, lieutenant general in the People's Liberation Army (b. 1912)
- June 8 — Yao Tongbin, scientist and missile engineer (b. 1922)
- June 20 — Rong Guotuan, table tennis player (b. 1937)
- July 3 — Wang Yaowu, Nationalist general (b. 1904)
- July 15 — Cai Chusheng, film director (b. 1906)
- July 16 — Hu Xiansu, botanist, scholar, literary critic and educator (b. 1894)
- August 3 — Yang Shuo, lyricist and essayist (b. 1913)
- October 15 — Sun Weishi, first female director of modern spoken drama (huaju) (b. 1920)
- October 26 — Zhao Jiuzhang, meteorologist and physicist (b. 1907)
- November 1 — Geshe Sherab Gyatso, ethnic Tibetan religious teacher and politician (b. 1884)
- November 2 — Li Guangtian, essayist (b. 1906)
- November 23 — Shangguan Yunzhu, actress (b. 1920)
- November 27 — Deng Baoshan, 2nd Governor of Gansu (b. 1894)
- November 28 — Xu Teli, politician (b. 1877)
- December 2 — Liao Yaoxiang, Nationalist general (b. 1906)
- December 5 — Guo Yonghuai, aerospace engineer and aerodynamics scientist (b. 1909)
- December 10 — Tian Han, drama activist, playwright, translator and poet (b. 1898)
- December 11 — Xiao Guangyan, petrochemist (b. 1920)
- December 18 — Jian Bozan, scholar and Marxist historian (b. 1898)
- December 26 — Xun Huisheng, one of Peking Opera's "Four Great Dan" (b. 1900)
- December 27 — Betty Loh Ti, Hong Kong actress (b. 1937)
