= 1935 in China =

- Decades: 1910s; 1920s; 1930s; 1940s; 1950s
- See also: Other events of 1935; History of China • Timeline • Years

Events in the year 1935 in China.

== Incumbents ==
- President: Lin Sen
- Premier: Wang Jingwei until December 1, Chiang Kai-shek
- Vice Premier: Kung Hsiang-hsi
- Foreign Minister: Zhang Qun

== Events ==
- January 15–17 — Zunyi Conference
- January – February 5 — First Encirclement Campaign against Hubei–Henan–Shaanxi Soviet
- February–April 18 — Second Encirclement Campaign against Hubei–Henan–Shaanxi Soviet
- April – July — Second Encirclement Campaign against the Shaanxi-Gansu Soviet
- May 29 — Battle of Luding Bridge
- June 10 — He–Umezu Agreement
- June 27 — Chin–Doihara Agreement
- August 20 – October 25 — Third Encirclement Campaign against the Shaanxi-Gansu Soviet

== Births ==
- January 7 — Li Shengjiao, diplomat and international jurist (d. 2017)
- March 4 — Ye Liansong, politician
- March 21 — Gu Jianfen, composer
- April 25 — Li Ao, Taiwanese writer, politician and television personality (d. 2018)
- May 13 — Zhao Fazhen, aquaculturist (d. 2025)
- May 30 — Ni Kuang, Hong Kong novelist and screenwriter (d. 2022)
- July 6 — Tenzin Gyatso, 14th Dalai Lama
- July 7 — Chan Wing-chan, politician
- July 13 — Qiu Xigui, historian, palaeographer and professor
- July 14 — Zhang Hanzhi, diplomat (d. 2008)
- July 18 — Luo Gan, politician
- September 1 — Chow Yei-ching, Hong Kong executive (d. 2018)
- November 1 — Xie Fang, actress and author (d. 2024)
- November 27 — Zhang Honggen, international football player and coach (d. 2003)
- December 6
  - Shan Tianfang, Pingshu performer (d. 2018)
  - Wang Hongwen, former Vice Chairman of the Chinese Communist Party (d. 1992)
- December 14 — Chiang Hsiao-wen, eldest son of 3rd President of the Republic of China Chiang Ching-kuo (d. 1989)

=== Dates unknown ===
- Yao Youxin, painter and professor
- Zhou Bangxin, engineer
- Chen Yaobang, politician
- Lin Xiling, activist and dissident
- Au Ho-nien, painter (d. 2024)
- Patsy Kar, Hong Kong actress (d. 2022)

== Deaths ==
- January 28 — Shen Hongying, general in the Old Guangxi clique (b. 1871)
- January 31 — Lu Diping, military general and politician (b. 1887)
- February 21 — Xie Zichang, key founder of the Chinese Red Army and the Chinese Soviet Republic in Shaanxi Province (b. 1897)
- February 24 — He Shuheng, communist revolutionary (b. 1876)
- March 5 — Chen Baochen, official during the late Qing era (b. 1848)
- March 8 — Ruan Lingyu, silent film actress (b. 1910)
- March 29 — Qian Zhuangfei, doctor, film director and secret agent for the CCP (b. 1895)
- April 25 — Mao Zetan, communist guerrilla soldier and younger brother of Mao Zedong (b. 1905)
- May 13 — Liu Zhennian, military commander (b. 1898)
- June 18 — Qu Qiubai, writer, poet, translator and political activist (b. 1899)
- July 16 — Zheng Zhengqiu, filmmaker (b. 1889)
- July 17 — Nie Er, composer best known for "March of the Volunteers" (b. 1912)
- August 6 — Fang Zhimin, communist military and political leader (b. 1899)
- September 1 — Hu Di, filmmaker and secret agent for the CCP (b. 1905)
- October 8 — Huang Kan, phonologist, philologist and revolutionary (b. 1886)
- November 13 — Sun Chuanfang, warlord of the Zhili clique (b. 1885)
