= 1988 in China =

- Decades: 1960s; 1970s; 1980s; 1990s; 2000s
- See also: Other events of 1988; History of China • Timeline • Years

The following lists events in the year 1988 in China.

== Incumbents ==
- General Secretary of the Communist Party: Zhao Ziyang
- President: Li Xiannian, Yang Shangkun
- Premier: Zhao Ziyang, Li Peng
- Vice President: Ulanhu (until April 8), Wang Zhen (starting April 8)
- Vice Premier: Wan Li (until 25 March), Yao Yilin (starting 25 March)

=== Governors ===
- Governor of Anhui Province – Lu Rongjing
- Governor of Fujian Province – Wang Zhaoguo
- Governor of Gansu Province – Jia Zhijie
- Governor of Guangdong Province – Ye Xuanping
- Governor of Guizhou Province – Wang Zhaowen
- Governor of Hainan Province – Liang Xiang then Liu Jianfeng
- Governor of Hebei Province – Xie Feng then Yue Qifeng
- Governor of Heilongjiang Province – Hou Jie
- Governor of Henan Province – Cheng Weigao
- Governor of Hubei Province – Guo Zhenqian
- Governor of Hunan Province – Xiong Qingquan
- Governor of Jiangsu Province – Gu Xiulian
- Governor of Jiangxi Province – Wu Guanzheng
- Governor of Jilin Province – He Zhukang
- Governor of Liaoning Province – Li Changchun
- Governor of Qinghai Province – Song Ruixiang
- Governor of Shaanxi Province – Hou Zongbin
- Governor of Shandong Province – Jiang Chunyun
- Governor of Shanxi Province – Wang Senhao
- Governor of Sichuan Province – Jiang Minkuan (until January), Zhang Haoruo (starting February)
- Governor of Yunnan Province – Li Jiating
- Governor of Zhejiang Province – Xue Ju (until January), Shen Zulun (starting February)

== Events ==
- 7th National People's Congress
- 18 January – China Southwest Airlines Flight 4146
- 24 January – According to Chinese government official confirmed report, a Kunming to Shanghai passenger train crush, and 13 cars derailment in Qujing, Yunnan Province, total kills 80 person and injures 65 person.
- 14 March – Johnson South Reef Skirmish
- 17 September – China National Petroleum Corporation was established, as changing from Petroleum and chemical industrial section of PRC. (People's Republic of China)
- December–January 1989 – Nanjing anti-African protests
- unknown date
  - Ping An Insurance founded.
  - Xigang Real Estate Development, as predecessor of Wanda Group founded in Dalian, Liaoning Province.
  - Skyworth was founded in Shenzhen.

== Culture ==
- List of Chinese films of 1988

== Sport ==
- China at the 1988 Summer Paralympics
- China at the 1988 Summer Olympics won a total of 28 medals
- China at the 1988 Winter Olympics won no medals

== Births ==
- January 21 – Xiao Yiming
- February 3 – Qian Jialing
- February 21 – Fan Jiachen
- March 14 – Ma Sichun, Chinese actress
- June 23 – Fu Yanlong
- November 25 – Rong Jing

== Deaths ==
- January 7 — Liao Mengxing, political activist (b. 1904)
- January 13 — Chiang Ching-kuo, Nationalist politician and President of the Republic of China (b. 1910)
- January 25 — Chen Shixiang, entomologist (b. 1905)
- February 16 — Ye Shengtao, writer, journalist, educator, publisher and politician (b. 1894)
- February 22 — Pao Ming Pu, mathematician (b. 1910)
- February 25 — Louis Zhang Jiashu, Jesuit priest (b. 1893)
- May 1 — Yan Wenliang, painter and educator (b. 1893)
- May 10 — Shen Congwen, writer (b. 1902)
- May 14 — Zhuang Xiquan, politician (b. 1888)
- June 22 — Xiao Jun, author and intellectual (b. 1907)
- June 23 — Liang Shuming, philosopher (b. 1893)
- July 13 — Ji Dengkui, Former Vice Premier of the People's Republic of China (b. 1923)
- July 26 — Lai Shiu Wing, footballer (b. 1917)
- July 31 — Li Fenglou, footballer and coach (b. 1912)
- August 8 — Liu Liangmo, musician and Chinese Christian leader (b. 1909)
- August 15 — Han Deqin, Nationalist general (b. 1892)
- August 30 — Yan Kelun, politician (b. 1913)
- September 3 — Miao Yuntai, politician (b. 1894)
- October 3 — Ma Haide, American doctor who practiced medicine in China (b. 1910)
- October 14 — Qian Changzhao, politician (b. 1899)
- November 6 — Tan Zheng, general (b. 1906)
- December 8 — Ulanhu, 3rd Vice President of China (b. 1906)
- December 22 — Wang Bingnan, diplomat (b. 1908)
- December 26 — Tao Zhiyue, military officer and politician (b. 1892)
