= 1984 in China =

- Decades: 1960s; 1970s; 1980s; 1990s; 2000s
- See also: Other events of 1984; History of China • Timeline • Years

The following lists events that happened during 1984 in the People's Republic of China.

== Incumbents ==
- General Secretary of the Communist Party: Hu Yaobang
- President: Li Xiannian
- Premier: Zhao Ziyang
- Chairman: Deng Yingchao
- Vice President: Ulanhu
- Vice Premier: Wan Li

=== Governors ===
- Governor of Anhui Province – Wang Yuzhao
- Governor of Fujian Province – Hu Ping
- Governor of Gansu Province – Chen Guangyi
- Governor of Guangdong Province – Liang Lingguang
- Governor of Guizhou Province – Wang Zhaowen
- Governor of Hebei Province – Zhang Shuguang
- Governor of Heilongjiang Province – Chen Lei
- Governor of Henan Province – He Zhukang
- Governor of Hubei Province – Huang Zhizhen
- Governor of Hunan Province – Liu Zheng
- Governor of Jiangsu Province – Gu Xiulian
- Governor of Jiangxi Province – Zhao Zengyi
- Governor of Jilin Province – Zhao Xiu
- Governor of Liaoning Province – Quan Shuren
- Governor of Qinghai Province – Huang Jingbo
- Governor of Shaanxi Province – Li Qingwei
- Governor of Shandong Province – Liang Buting
- Governor of Shanxi Province – Wang Senhao
- Governor of Sichuan Province – Yang Xizong
- Governor of Yunnan Province – Pu Chaozhu
- Governor of Zhejiang Province – Xue Ju

== Events ==
- In 1984, China began its state key laboratory program. These laboratories were an instrument for focusing investment and raising the level of basic research in China at a time when resources were limited and distributed unevenly across the country.
- January 1 – Industrial and Commercial Bank of China was established.
- November 1 – Lenovo was founded, as predecessor name was China Academy of Science Computational Development Company.
- December 19 – Signing of the Sino-British Joint Declaration

== Culture ==
- List of Chinese films in 1984

== Sport ==
- October 13 to 24 – 1984 ABC Championship for Women, in Shanghai
- China at the 1984 Summer Paralympics
- China at the 1984 Summer Olympics won a total of 32 medals
- China at the 1984 Winter Olympics won no medals

== Births ==
- January 26 — Luo Xuejuan, swimmer
- January 30 — Wang Luodan, actress and singer
- February 9 — Han Geng, Mandopop singer and actor
- March 10 — Li Yuchun, singer, songwriter, DJ and actress
- April 15 — Chen Qi, table tennis player
- June 20 — An Yiru, freelance writer Zhang Li
- October 6 — Hans Zhang, actor, singer and host
- October 11 — Jane Zhang, singer-songwriter
- October 12 — Yang Lei, pop singer and actress
- October 26 — Stephy Qi, singer and actress
- November 12 — Yan Zi, tennis player
- December 27 — Dai Xiangyu, actor

== Deaths ==
- January 21 — Fang Ganmin, painter, sculptor and educator (b. 1906)
- February 5 — Su Yu, military commander (b. 1907)
- March 24 — Xu Huang, diplomat (b. 1915)
- April 14 — He Zizhen, third wife of Mao Zedong (b. 1910)
- May 17 — Cheng Fangwu, politician (b. 1897)
- June 6 — K.C. Wu, former Nationalist Mayor of Shanghai (b. 1903)
- July 29 — Zhou Jianren, politician and biologist (b. 1888)
- August 11 — Li Weihan, politician (b. 1896)
- October 19 — Jin Yuelin, philosopher (b. 1895)
- December 11 — Wang Xinting, general (b. 1908)
