= 1966 in China =

- Decades: 1940s; 1950s; 1960s; 1970s; 1980s
- See also: Other events of 1966; History of China • Timeline • Years

Events from the year 1966 in China.

== Incumbents ==
- Chairman of the Chinese Communist Party — Mao Zedong
- President of China — Liu Shaoqi
- Premier of China — Zhou Enlai
- Chairman of the Standing Committee of the National People's Congress — Zhu De
- Vice President of China — Soong Ching-ling and Dong Biwu
- Vice Premier of China — Lin Biao

=== Governors ===
- Governor of Anhui Province — Huang Yan
- Governor of Fujian Province — Wei Jinshui
- Governor of Gansu Province — Deng Baoshan
- Governor of Guangdong Province — Chen Yu
- Governor of Guizhou Province — Li Li
- Governor of Hebei Province — Liu Zihou
- Governor of Heilongjiang Province — Li Fanwu
- Governor of Henan Province — Wen Minsheng
- Governor of Hubei Province — Zhang Tixue
- Governor of Hunan Province — Cheng Qian
- Governor of Jiangsu Province — Hui Yuyu
- Governor of Jiangxi Province — Fang Zhichun
- Governor of Jilin Province — Li Youwen
- Governor of Liaoning Province — Huang Oudong
- Governor of Qinghai Province — Wang Zhao
- Governor of Shaanxi Province — Li Qiming (until April), Li Ruishan (starting April)
- Governor of Shandong Province — Bai Rubing
- Governor of Shanxi Province — Wang Qian
- Governor of Sichuan Province — Li Dazhang
- Governor of Yunnan Province — Zhou Xing
- Governor of Zhejiang Province — Zhou Jianren

== Events ==
- 16 May Notification launches the Cultural Revolution
- Beginning of the Red Guards movement
- Third five-year plan
- In 1966, China transitioned from vacuum-tube computers to fully transistorized computers.

== Births ==
- January 25 — Gao Hongbo, football manager
- March 16 — Deng Qingming, taikonaut
- March 19 — Qin Gang, 12th Minister of Foreign Affairs
- May 22 — Wang Xiaoshuai, film director, screenwriter and occasional actor
- July 10 — Amy Yip, Hong Kong actress
- September 17 — Liu Boming, fighter pilot
- October 10 — Bai Ling, American actress and musician
- October 11 — Zhai Zhigang, taikonaut
- October 24 — Jing Haipeng, fighter pilot
- December 11 — Leon Lai, actor, film director, businessman and Cantopop singer

== Deaths ==
- February 17 — Chen Shutong, politician, scholar and administrator who served in governments of the Qing dynasty, Republic of China and the People's Republic of China (b. 1876)
- March 22 — Ai Siqi, philosopher and author (b. 1910)
- May 18 — Deng Tuo, poet, intellectual and journalist (b. 1912)
- May 23
  - Demchugdongrub, Mongol prince (b. 1902)
  - Tian Jiaying, personal secretary of Mao Zedong (b. 1922)
- July 12 — Liangqing, monk (b. 1895)
- August 4 — Cao Rulin, former Vice Minister of Foreign Affairs of the Beiyang government (b. 1877)
- August 24
  - Lao She, writer (b. 1899)
  - Li Da, Chinese Marxist philosopher (b. 1890)
- August 31 — Huang Shaohong, general (b. 1895)
- September 3
  - Fu Lei, translator and critic (b. 1908)
  - Chen Mengjia, scholar, poet, paleographer and archaeologist (b. 1911)
- September 10 — Yan Huizhu, opera singer (b. 1919)
- September 19 — Wan Xiaotang, politician (b. 1916)
- October 1 — Zhao Chengshou, nationalist general (b. 1891)
- October 11 — Sun Zhiyuan, politician (b. 1911)
- October 22 — Li Ming, banking and investing pioneer (b. 1887)
- November 11 — Yu Hongzheng, chemist (b. 1897)
- December 2 — Bai Chongxi, nationalist general (b. 1893)
- December 12 — Wu Yuzhang, politician and educator (b. 1878)
- December 16 — Ma Lianliang, Peking opera singer (b. 1901)
- December 26 — Zhou Xiaozhou, politician and communist revolutionary (b. 1912)

== See also ==
- 1966 in Chinese film
