= 1964 in China =

- Decades: 1940s; 1950s; 1960s; 1970s; 1980s
- See also: Other events of 1964; History of China • Timeline • Years

Events from the year 1964 in China.

== Incumbents ==
- Chairman of the Chinese Communist Party – Mao Zedong
- President of the People's Republic of China – Liu Shaoqi
- Premier of the People's Republic of China – Zhou Enlai
- Chairman of the National People's Congress – Zhu De
- Vice President of the People's Republic of China – Soong Ching-ling and Dong Biwu
- Vice Premier of the People's Republic of China – Chen Yun (until December 21), Lin Biao (starting December 21)

=== Governors ===
- Governor of Anhui Province – Huang Yan
- Governor of Fujian Province – Wei Jinshui
- Governor of Gansu Province – Deng Baoshan
- Governor of Guangdong Province – Chen Yu
- Governor of Guizhou Province – Zhou Lin (politician)
- Governor of Hebei Province – Liu Zihou
- Governor of Heilongjiang Province – Li Fanwu
- Governor of Henan Province – Wen Minsheng
- Governor of Hubei Province – Zhang Tixue
- Governor of Hunan Province – Cheng Qian
- Governor of Jiangsu Province – Hui Yuyu
- Governor of Jiangxi Province – Shao Shiping
- Governor of Jilin Province – Li Youwen
- Governor of Liaoning Province – Huang Oudong
- Governor of Qinghai Province – Wang Zhao
- Governor of Shaanxi Province – Li Qiming
- Governor of Shandong Province – Bai Rubing
- Governor of Shanxi Province – Wei Heng
- Governor of Sichuan Province – Li Dazhang
- Governor of Yunnan Province – Ding Yichuan
- Governor of Zhejiang Province – Zhou Jianren

== Events ==
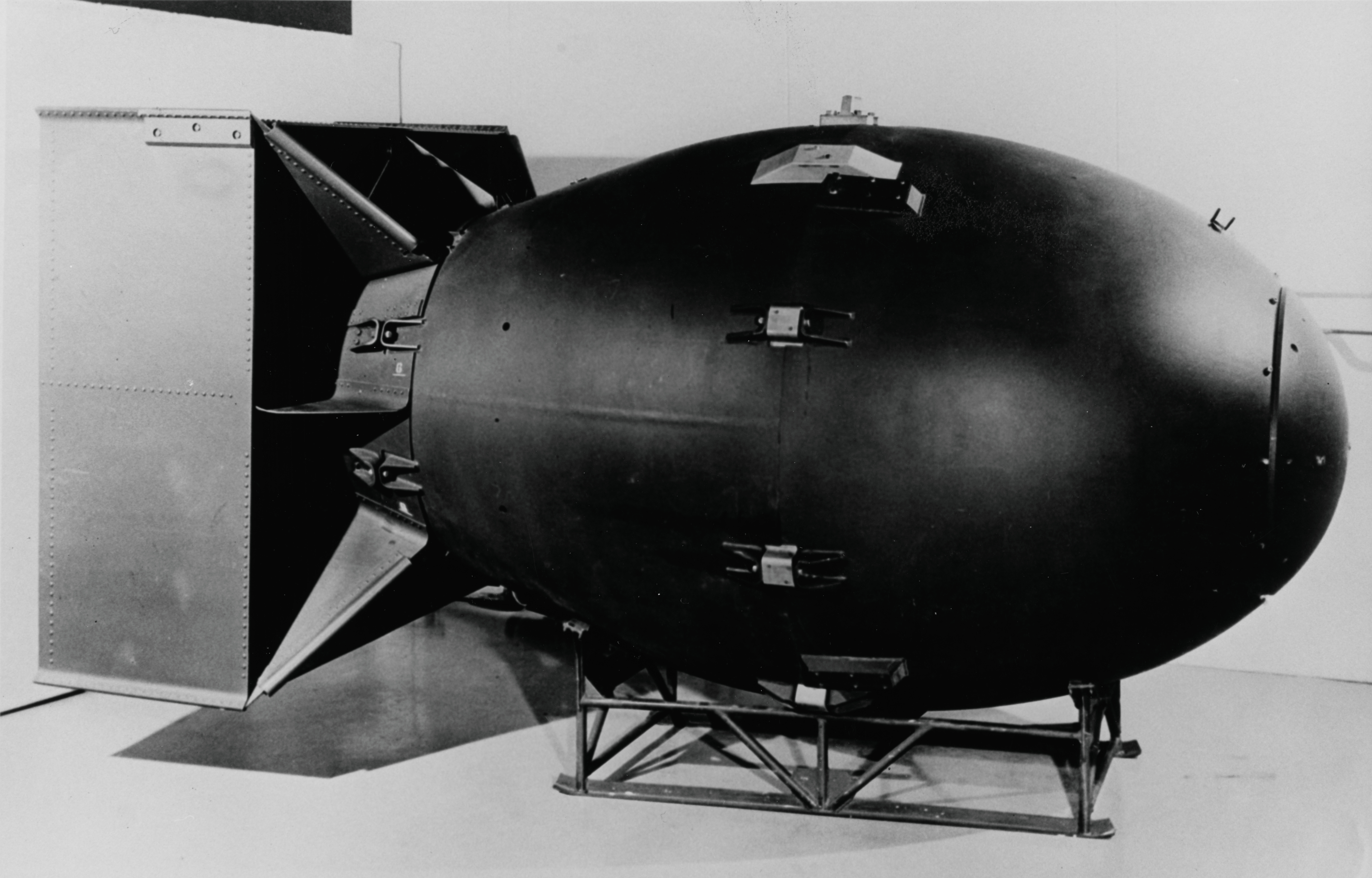
On October 16, 1964, China detonated its first atomic bomb

- Beginning in 1964, China through the Third Front construction built a self-sufficient industrial base in its hinterlands as a strategic reserve in the event of war with the Soviet Union or the United States.
- In 1964, the Chinese Academy of Sciences debuted China's first self-developed large digital computer, the 119. The 119 was a core technology in facilitating China's first successful nuclear weapon test (Project 596), also in 1964.

=== January ===
- January 25 – France and China establish diplomatic relations.

=== October ===
- October 16 – China explodes an atomic bomb in Sinkiang.

== Births ==
- April 26 – Zhu Jun, actor and host
- June 23 – Lou Yun, gymnast
- August 3 – Ye Qiaobo, speed skater
- October 30 – Ma Xiangjun, archer
- Jiang Yu, politician
- Gao Chengyong, serial killer and rapist (d. 2019)

== Deaths ==
- February 5 — Gan Siqi, general (b. 1904)
- March 30 — Deng Xihou, prominent warlord of Sichuan (b. 1889)
- April 22 — Zhou Baozhong, military commander (b. 1902)
- May 1 — Tang Yongtong, educator, philosopher and scholar (b. 1893)
- May 14 — Jiao Yulu, politician (b. 1922)
- July 6 — Zeng Junchen, businessman and opium kingpin from Sichuan (b. 1888)
- July 19 — Si Xingjian, paleobotanist and stratigrapher (b. 1901)
- September 22 — Yu Xuezhong, Nationalist general and pro-Communist politician (b. 1890)
- November 10 — Yu Youren, educator, scholar, calligrapher and politician (b. 1879)

== See also ==
- Timeline of Chinese history
- 1964 in Chinese film
