= 1960 in China =

- Decades: 1940s; 1950s; 1960s; 1970s; 1980s
- See also: Other events of 1960; History of China • Timeline • Years

Events in the year 1960 in the People's Republic of China.

== Incumbents ==
- Chairman of the Chinese Communist Party — Mao Zedong
- President of the People's Republic of China — Liu Shaoqi
- Premier of the People's Republic of China — Zhou Enlai
- Chairman of the National People's Congress — Zhu De
- Vice President of the People's Republic of China — Soong Ching-ling and Dong Biwu
- Vice Premier of the People's Republic of China — Chen Yun

=== Governors ===
- Governor of Anhui Province – Huang Yan
- Governor of Fujian Province – Wu Hongxiang (starting unknown)
- Governor of Gansu Province – Deng Baoshan
- Governor of Guangdong Province – Chen Yu
- Governor of Guizhou Province – Zhou Lin (politician)
- Governor of Hebei Province – Liu Zihou
- Governor of Heilongjiang Province – Li Fanwu
- Governor of Henan Province – Wu Zhipu
- Governor of Hubei Province – Zhang Tixue
- Governor of Hunan Province – Cheng Qian
- Governor of Jiangsu Province – Hui Yuyu
- Governor of Jiangxi Province – Shao Shiping
- Governor of Jilin Province – Li Youwen
- Governor of Liaoning Province – Huang Oudong
- Governor of Qinghai Province – Yang Renyuan
- Governor of Shaanxi Province – Zhao Boping
- Governor of Shandong Province – Tan Qilong
- Governor of Shanxi Province – Wei Heng
- Governor of Sichuan Province – Li Dazhang
- Governor of Yunnan Province – Ding Yichuan
- Governor of Zhejiang Province – Zhou Jianren

== Events ==
=== February ===
- February 11 — Twelve Indian soldiers die in clashes with Red Chinese troops along their small common border.

=== May ===
- May 9 — According to Chinese government official confirmed report, a Datong Laobaidong Coal mine gas explosion in Shanxi Province, 220 workers were rescued, 684 workers were perished.

=== June ===
- June 9 — Typhoon "Mary" kills 1,600 people in the Fukien province of China.

== Births ==
- February
  - Ai Baojun, politician
  - February 2 — Kara Wai, Hong Kong actress
  - February 16 — Cherie Chung, Hong Kong film actress
- March
  - Cheng Qiuming, mathematical geoscientist
  - March 6 — Buren Bayaer, singer, composer and journalist (d. 2018)
- April 2 — Chen Siqing, banker
- April 3
  - Yu Hua, author
  - Lü Liping, actress
- April 18 — Ni Dahong, actor
- April 25 — Zhou Qiang, politician
- April 28 — Edward Yau, Hong Kong politician
- June 4 — Ge Ping, voice and television actor
- September 5 — Dayo Wong, Hong Kong actor and stand-up comedian
- September 29 — Chen Min'er, politician
- November 5 — Teresa Mo, Hong Kong actress
- November 18 — Priscilla Leung, Hong Kong Legislative Councillor
- November 28 — Ken Choi, Hong Kong singer and actor
- December
  - Bai Yun, politician
  - December 12 — Berg Ng, Hong Kong actor
  - December 22 — Wakin Chau, Hong Kong singer and actor

== Deaths ==
- January 17 — Wei Lihuang, Nationalist general (b. 1897)
- January 21 — Wu Lien-teh, Malayan physician known for work on the Manchurian plague of 1910-1911 (b. 1879)
- February 8 — Lin Hu, warlord of Old Guangxi clique (b. 1887)
- February 22 — Simon Zhu Kaimin, Bishop of Jiangsu (b. 1868)
- May 23 — Yan Xishan, warlord (b. 1883)
- May 29 — Lin Boqu, politician and poet (b. 1886)
- July 1 — He Bingyan, colonel general (b. 1913)
- October 21 — Ma Hongbin, Muslim warlord of the Ma clique (b. 1884)
- November 27 — Kwan Sung-sing, construction engineer, architect and entrepreneur (b. 1892)

=== Unknown ===
- Cai Pei, diplomat and politician (b. 1884)
- Rong Zhen, military commander of the Fengtian cilque (b. 1891)

== See also ==
- 1960 in Chinese film
