= 1956 in China =

- Decades: 1930s; 1940s; 1950s; 1960s; 1970s
- See also: Other events of 1956; History of China • Timeline • Years

Events in the year 1956 in China. The country had an estimated population of 620 million people.

== Incumbents ==
- Chairman of the Chinese Communist Party: Mao Zedong
- President of the People's Republic of China: Mao Zedong
- Premier of the People's Republic of China: Zhou Enlai
- Chairman of the National People's Congress: Liu Shaoqi
- Vice President of the People's Republic of China: Zhu De
- Vice Premier of the People's Republic of China: Chen Yun

=== Governors ===
- Governor of Anhui Province: Huang Yan
- Governor of Fujian Province: Ye Fei
- Governor of Gansu Province: Deng Baoshan
- Governor of Guangdong Province: Tao Zhu
- Governor of Guizhou Province: Zhou Lin
- Governor of Hebei Province: Lin Tie
- Governor of Heilongjiang Province: Han Guang then Ouyang Qin
- Governor of Henan Province: Wu Zhipu
- Governor of Hubei Province: Liu Zihou then Zhang Tixue
- Governor of Hunan Province: Cheng Qian
- Governor of Jiangsu Province: Hui Yuyu
- Governor of Jiangxi Province: Shao Shiping
- Governor of Jilin Province: Li Youwen
- Governor of Liaoning Province: Du Zheheng
- Governor of Qinghai Province: Sun Zuobin
- Governor of Shaanxi Province: Zhao Shoushan
- Governor of Shandong Province: Zhao Jianmin
- Governor of Shanxi Province: Pei Lisheng then Wang Shiying
- Governor of Sichuan Province: Li Dazhang
- Governor of Yunnan Province: Guo Yingqiu
- Governor of Zhejiang Province: Sha Wenhan

== Events ==
- September 28 — First Plenary Session of the 8th Central Committee of the Chinese Communist Party
- September 28 — Election of the 8th Politburo of the Chinese Communist Party
- Hundred Flowers Campaign
- Continuing Kuomintang Islamic insurgency in China

=== Other events ===
- Establishment of the Chinese Skating Association
- Establishment of the Shanghai Natural History Museum
- Hnhhot Huimin Cattle and Breeding Association, as predecessor of Yili Diary Group was founded in Inner Mongolia.
- Shaoxinggaoji High School is founded.
- China began a formal computing development program in 1956 when it launched the Twelve-Year Science Plan and formed the Beijing Institute of Computing Technology under the Chinese Academy of Sciences (CAS).

== Education ==
- Establishments:
  - Beijing University of Chinese Medicine
  - Capital University of Economics and Business
  - Central Institute for Correctional Police
  - Chongqing Medical University
  - Chongqing Three Gorges University
  - First Affiliated Hospital of Xinjiang Medical University
  - Hangzhou Xuejun High School
  - High School Affiliated to Beijing International Studies University

== Sports ==
- Establishment of Jilin Northeast Tigers
- Chinese Sports Committee oversees creation of new, simplified (and shorter) 24 Form Tai Chi. Due to this official promotion, the 24-form is most likely the Taiji form with the most practitioners in China and the world over.

== Births ==
=== January ===
- January 5 — Tong Xiaolin, physician
- January 11 — Geoffrey Ma, 3rd Chief Judge of the High Court of Hong Kong

=== February ===
- February 25 — Wei Zi, film and television actor

=== March ===
- March 9 — Chen Baoguo, actor

=== June ===
- June 21 — Larry Hsien Ping Lang, Hong Kong-based economist, commentator, author and TV host
- June 22 — Sima Nan, television pundit, social commentator and journalist

=== August ===
- August 13 — Li Hongzhong, member of the 20th Politburo of the Chinese Communist Party
- August 15 — Lu Shuming, actor (d. 2022)
- August 30 — King Pu-tsung, Taiwanese politician
- August 31 — Tsai Ing-wen, Taiwanese politician

=== September ===
- September 1 — Zhang Fengyi, actor
- September 2 — Cheung Ming-man, Hong Kong singer and occasional actor
- September 12 — Leslie Cheung, Hong Kong singer and actor (d. 2003)
- September 30 — Teresa Carpio, Hong Kong English and Cantonese language pop singer, actress and singing teacher
- Shi Taifeng, member of the 20th Politburo of the Chinese Communist Party

=== October ===
- October 1 — Hou Dejian, Taiwanese songwriter, composer and singer
- October 2 — Deng Zongquan, scientist
- October 3 — Chang Chen-kuang, Taiwanese actor
- October 7 — Sun Haiying, actor
- October 12 — Regina Hing Yue Tsang, actress, singer and beauty pageant
- October 16 — Li Xi, 13th Secretary of the Central Commission for Discipline Inspection

=== November ===
- November 15 — Huang Kunming, member of the 20th Politburo of the Chinese Communist Party

=== December ===
- December 27 — Wu Yingjie, 14th Secretary of the Tibet Autonomous Regional Committee of the Chinese Communist Party
- December 30 — Yuen Kwok-yung, Hong Kong microbiologist, physician and surgeon

== Deaths ==
- March 7 — Yang Zhensheng, educator and author (b. 1890)
- April 2 — Tan Pingshan, early member of the Chinese Communist Party (b. 1886)
- April 25 — He Jian, nationalist general (b. 1887)
- August 23 — Li Du, leading general of the Jilin Self-Defence Army (b. 1880)
- December 11 — Mao Renfeng, nationalist general and spymaster (b. 1898)

== See also ==
- 1956 in Chinese film
