= 1967 in China =

- Decades: 1940s; 1950s; 1960s; 1970s; 1980s
- See also: Other events of 1967; History of China • Timeline • Years

Events from the year 1967 in China.

== Incumbents ==
- Chairman of the Chinese Communist Party – Mao Zedong
- President of the People's Republic of China – Liu Shaoqi
- Premier of the People's Republic of China – Zhou Enlai
- Chairman of the National People's Congress – Zhu De
- Vice President of the People's Republic of China – Soong Ching-ling and Dong Biwu
- Vice Premier of the People's Republic of China – Lin Biao

=== Governors ===
- Governor of Anhui Province – Huang Yan
- Governor of Fujian Province – Wei Jinshui then Han Xianchu
- Governor of Gansu Province – Deng Baoshan then Xian Henghan
- Governor of Guangdong Province – Chen Yu (until November), Huang Yongsheng (starting November)
- Governor of Guizhou Province – Li Li then Ma Li
- Governor of Hebei Province – Liu Zihou
- Governor of Heilongjiang Province – Pan Fusheng (starting unknown)
- Governor of Henan Province – Wen Minsheng (starting unknown)
- Governor of Hubei Province – Zhang Tixue (until unknown)
- Governor of Hunan Province – Cheng Qian (until unknown)
- Governor of Jiangsu Province – Hui Yuyu (until unknown)
- Governor of Jiangxi Province – Fang Zhichun (until unknown)
- Governor of Jilin Province – Li Youwen (until unknown), Wang Huaixiang (starting unknown)
- Governor of Liaoning Province – Huang Oudong (until unknown)
- Governor of Qinghai Province – Wang Zhao then Liu Xianquan
- Governor of Shaanxi Province – Li Ruishan
- Governor of Shandong Province – Bai Rubing then Wang Xiaoyu
- Governor of Shanxi Province – Wang Qian then Liu Geping
- Governor of Sichuan Province – vacant
- Governor of Yunnan Province – vacant
- Governor of Zhejiang Province – vacant

== Events ==
- Nathu La and Cho La incidents
- Daoxian massacre
- Red Guards (China)
- Shanghai People's Commune
- Wuhan Incident
- China conducting its first hydrogen bomb test in 1967.

== Births ==
- Lu Hao (born 1967)
- Zhou Danhong
- Wang Tao (footballer, born 1967)
- Cao Mianying
- Shu Qingquan
- He Zhuoqiang

== Deaths ==
- January 8 — Yan Hongyan, general in the People's Liberation Army (b. 1909)
- January 21 — Tao Yong, military leader (b. 1913)
- January 22 — Zhang Linzhi, 2nd Secretary of the Chongqing Municipal Committee of the Chinese Communist Party (b. 1908)
- January 27 — Nan Hanchen, 1st Governor of the People's Bank of China (b. 1895)
- January 31 — Gu Shengying, classical concert pianist (b. 1937)
- February 2 — Zhao Erlu, general in the People's Liberation Army (b. 1905)
- February 3 — Yang Zhicheng, general in the People's Liberation Army (b. 1903)
- February 15 — Zhang Henshui, novelist (b. 1895)
- March 30 — Yao Min, popular music songwriter and singer and brother of Yao Lee (b. 1917)
- May 6 — Zhou Zuoren, writer and brother of Lu Xun (b. 1885)
- June 8 — Jiang Guangnai, statesman and famous Anti Japanese resistance general (b. 1888)
- June 10 — Pan Guangdan, sociologist, eugenist and writer (b. 1899)
- June 22 — Li Lisan, revolutionary and politician (b. 1899)
- August 16 — H. H. Kung, banker and politician (b. 1880)
- August 22 — Yang Mingxuan, 4th Chairman of the China Democratic League (b. 1891)
- September 30 — Meng Tai, model worker (b. 1898)
- October 17 — Puyi, last emperor of the Qing Dynasty (b. 1906)
- October 19 — Wu Zhipu, 1st Governor of Henan (b. 1906)
- December 8 — Zeng Zhaolun, chemist and politician (b. 1899)

=== Dates unknown ===
- Ye Yuanlong, educator and economist (b. 1897)

== See also ==
- 1967 in Chinese film
