= 1946 in China =

- Decades: 1920s; 1930s; 1940s; 1950s; 1960s
- See also: Other events of 1946; History of China • Timeline • Years

Events in the year 1946 in the Republic of China. This year is numbered Minguo 35 according to the official Republic of China calendar.

== Incumbents ==
- President – Chiang Kai-shek
- Premier – T. V. Soong
- Vice Premier – Weng Wenhao

== Events ==
=== January ===
- 19–22 January – Houma Campaign
- 21 January – The establishment of Penghu County Government in Taiwan.

=== April ===
- 15–17 March – Battle of Siping
- April 17 – May 19 – Campaign to Defend Siping

=== May ===
- 1 May
  - The establishment of Taiwan Power Company in Taiwan.
  - The establishment of Taiwan Cement Limited Corporation in Taiwan.
- August 14 – September 1 – Datong-Puzhou Campaign
- August 14 – September 22 – Battle of Huaiyin-Huai'an
- August 25–31 – Battle of Rugao-Huangqiao

=== September ===
- 2–8 September – Dingtao Campaign.
- 22–24 September – Linfen-Fushan Campaign.

== Births ==
=== January ===
- January 7 — Mak Ho Wai, Hong Kong-Singaporean actor (d. 2022)
- January 8 — Yu Xunfa, flute player (d. 2006)

=== February ===
- February 7 — Zhu Qingshi, physical chemist and writer
- February 14 — Timothy Fok, eldest son of Henry Fok
- Huang Xiaojing, 17th Governor of Fujian

=== March ===
- March 3 — Song Defu, 9th Secretary of the Fujian Provincial Committee of the Chinese Communist Party (d. 2007)

=== April ===
- April 8 — Raymond Wong Pak-ming, Hong Kong film producer, playwright, director and actor
- April 18 — Li Jianguo, member of the 18th Politburo of the Chinese Communist Party
- April 24 — Chin Han, Taiwanese actor
- April 30 — Ni Min-jan, Taiwanese celebrity and entertainer (d. 2005)

=== May ===
- May 18 — Frank Hsieh, Taiwanese politician
- Cao Dewang, entrepreneur

=== June ===
- June 4 — Bao Guo'an, actor
- June 14 — Ha Yu, Hong Kong actor
- June 29 — Ma Kai, former Vice Premier of China

=== July ===
- July 3 — Albert Cheng, Hong Kong professional engineer
- July 10 — Chin Han, Shanghai-born Taiwanese actor, son of Sun Yuanliang
- July 30 — Chen Xiaolu, military officer and businessman (d. 2018)
- Dong Guishan, former Commander of the Tibet Military District

=== August ===
- August 3 — Ricky Hui, Hong Kong actor and singer (d. 2011)
- August 17 — Wei Liucheng, 8th Secretary of the Hainan Provincial Committee of the Chinese Communist Party
- August 19 — Ti Lung, Hong Kong actor
- August 23 — Yu Qiuyu, writer and scholar
- August 26 — Zhou Ji, mechanical engineer and politician

=== September ===
- September 15 — Yang Xiuzhu, former female politician
- September 20 — Alan Tang, Hong Kong film actor, producer and director (d. 2011)
- September 22
  - Law Kar-ying, Hong Kong Cantonese opera singer and actor
  - John Woo, Hong Kong film director

=== October ===
- October 9 — Anthony Yuen, Chinese American editor and anchor (d. 2020)
- October 24 — Chen Liangyu, 14th Secretary of the Shanghai Municipal Committee of the Chinese Communist Party
- Huang Huahua, 15th Governor of Guangdong
- Tang Haoming, novelist

=== November ===
- November 1 — Zhang Gaoli, former Vice Premier of China
- November 4 — Zhang Dejiang, 9th Chairman of the Standing Committee of the National People's Congress
- November 8 — Michael Lai, Hong Kong music composer, record producer and actor (d. 2019)
- November 13 — Li Shenglin, politician
- November 25 — Lily Ho, Taiwanese actress
- November 28 — Li Baotian, actor
- Du Qinglin, politician

=== December ===
- December 5 — Chu Ke-liang, Taiwanese comedian, actor, television show host and singer (d. 2017)
- December 10 — Connie Chan, Hong Kong actress
- December 24 — Andrew Yao, computer scientist and computational theorist

=== Dates unknown ===
- Guan Guimin, operatic tenor (d. 2022)
- Liu Chunxian, Major General
- Yang Xianhui, novelist

== Deaths ==
- February 20 — Li Liejun, revolutionary leader and general (b. 1882)
- March 9 — Li Zhaolin, founder and leader of the 3rd Route Army, a division of the Northeast Anti-Japanese United Army (b. 1910)
- March 17 — Dai Li, lieutenant general and spymaster (b. 1897)
- April 8 — 1946 United States Air Force C-47 Crash at Yan'an
  - Bo Gu, 3rd General Secretary of the Chinese Communist Party (b. 1907)
  - Ye Ting, military officer (b. 1896)
  - Wang Ruofei, high-ranking member of the Chinese Communist Party (b. 1896)
  - Deng Fa, early leader of the Chinese Communist Party (b. 1906)
- April 19 — Rikichi Andō, 19th Governor-General of Taiwan (b. 1884)
- June 3 — Chen Gongbo, politician (b. 1892)
- June 20 — Wanrong, wife and empress consort of Puyi (b. 1906)
- July 15 — Wen Yiduo, poet and scholar (b. 1899)
- July 25
  - Tao Xingzhi, educator and reformer (b. 1891)
  - Ho Ping-sung, historian (b. 1890)
- August 23 — Chu Minyi, politician (b. 1884)
- November 6 — Liang Hongzhi, leading official in the Anhui clique of the Beiyang Government (b. 1882)
- December 18 — Qi Xieyuan, warlord of the Zhili Clique (b. 1885)

== See also ==
- List of Chinese films of the 1940s
