= 1970 in China =

- Decades: 1950s; 1960s; 1970s; 1980s; 1990s
- See also: Other events of 1970; History of China • Timeline • Years

Events in the year 1970 in the People's Republic of China.

== Incumbents ==
- Chairman of the Chinese Communist Party – Mao Zedong
- President of the People's Republic of China – vacant
- Premier of the People's Republic of China – Zhou Enlai
- Chairman of the National People's Congress – Zhu De
- Vice President of the People's Republic of China – Soong Ching-ling and Dong Biwu
- Vice Premier of the People's Republic of China – Lin Biao

=== Governors ===
- Governor of Anhui Province – Li Desheng
- Governor of Fujian Province – Han Xianchu
- Governor of Gansu Province – Song Ping
- Governor of Guangdong Province – Liu Xingyuan
- Governor of Guizhou Province – Ma Li
- Governor of Hebei Province – Li Zaihe
- Governor of Heilongjiang Province – Pan Fusheng
- Governor of Henan Province – Liu Jianxun
- Governor of Hubei Province – Zeng Siyu
- Governor of Hunan Province – Li Yuan then Hua Guofeng
- Governor of Jiangsu Province – Xu Shiyou
- Governor of Jiangxi Province – Cheng Shiqing
- Governor of Jilin Province – Wang Huaixiang
- Governor of Liaoning Province – Chen Xilian
- Governor of Qinghai Province – Liu Xianquan
- Governor of Shaanxi Province – Li Ruishan
- Governor of Shandong Province – Yang Dezhi
- Governor of Shanxi Province – Liu Geping
- Governor of Sichuan Province – Zhang Guohua
- Governor of Yunnan Province – Tan Furen (until October), Zhou Xing (starting October)
- Governor of Zhejiang Province – Nan Ping

== Events ==
- China tested its long-range DF-4 missile in 1970.

=== April ===
- April 24 – China launched its first space satellite Dong Fang Hong I as part of the PRC's Dong Fang Hong space satellite program.

=== October ===
- October 13 – The People's Republic of China and Canada signed established diplomatic relations.
- October 14 – A Chinese nuclear test is conducted in Lop Nor.

=== December ===
- December 30 – Construction of the Gezhouba Dam started.

== Births ==
- September 7 – Gao Min, Chinese diver
- October 30 – Xie Jun, Chinese chess grandmaster

== Deaths ==
- January 14 — Ma Hongkui, Muslim warlord (b. 1892)
- March 25 — Xu Haidong, senior general in the People's Liberation Army (b. 1900)
- April 6 — Tang Shengzhi, warlord (b. 1889)
- May 4 — Ma Xulun, politician, activist and linguist (b. 1885)
- July 13 — Sheng Shicai, warlord who ruled Xinjiang from 1933 to 1944 (b. 1897)
- September 20 — Gong Peng, wartime spokeswoman for the Chinese Communist Party (b. 1914)
- September 23 — Zhao Shuli, Chinese novelist and a leading figure of modern Chinese literature (b. 1906)
- September 27 — Li Tianyou, general in the People's Liberation Army (b. 1914)
- October 21 — Li Linsi, educator, diplomat and scholar (b. 1896)
- November 5 — Xie Xuehong, 1st Chairwoman of the Taiwan Democratic Self-Government League (b. 1901)
- December 10
  - Huang Qixiang, military commander and statesman (b. 1898)
  - Chen Qiyou, Chairman of the China Zhi Gong Party (b. 1892)

== See also ==
- 1970 in Chinese film
