= 1986 in China =

- Decades: 1960s; 1970s; 1980s; 1990s; 2000s
- See also: Other events of 1986; History of China • Timeline • Years

The following lists events in the year 1986 in China.

== Incumbents ==
- General Secretary of the Communist Party: Hu Yaobang
- President: Li Xiannian
- Premier: Zhao Ziyang
- Vice President: Ulanhu
- Vice Premier: Wan Li

=== Governors ===
- Governor of Anhui Province – Wang Yuzhao
- Governor of Fujian Province – Hu Ping then Wang Zhaoguo
- Governor of Gansu Province – Chen Guangyi then Jia Zhijie
- Governor of Guangdong Province – Ye Xuanping
- Governor of Guizhou Province – Wang Zhaowen
- Governor of Hebei Province – Zhang Shuguang then Xie Feng
- Governor of Heilongjiang Province – Hou Jie
- Governor of Henan Province – He Zhukang
- Governor of Hubei Province – Huang Zhizhen then Guo Zhenqian
- Governor of Hunan Province – Xiong Qingquan
- Governor of Jiangsu Province – Gu Xiulian
- Governor of Jiangxi Province – Ni Xiance then Wu Guanzheng
- Governor of Jilin Province – Gao Dezhan
- Governor of Liaoning Province – Quan Shuren then Li Changchun
- Governor of Qinghai Province – Song Ruixiang then Jin Jipeng
- Governor of Shaanxi Province – Li Qingwei then Zhang Boxing
- Governor of Shandong Province – Li Chang'an then Jiang Chunyun
- Governor of Shanxi Province – Wang Senhao
- Governor of Sichuan Province – Jiang Minkuan (until January), Zhang Haoruo (starting February)
- Governor of Yunnan Province – Li Jiating
- Governor of Zhejiang Province – Xue Ju (until January), Shen Zulun (starting February)

== Events ==
- In 1986, the National Natural Sciences Foundation of China was established.
- In March 1986, China launched the large-scale technology development plan, the 863 Project.
- Unknown date – Lianyuan Welding Material, as predecessor of Sany (Sanyi Heavy Industry), one of the leading heavy equipment brands in the world, was founded in Hunan Province.

== Births ==
- 12 October – Li Wenliang
- 22 January — Alvin Jiang

== Deaths ==
- January 16 — Hu Yuzhi, former Vice Chairperson of the Chinese People's Political Consultative Conference (b. 1896)
- March 4 — Ding Ling, writer (b. 1904)
- March 6 — Zhu Guangqian, scholar and theoretician of aesthetics (b. 1897)
- March 26 — Chen Yonggui, Vice Premier of China (b. 1915)
- March 28 — Gan Zuchang, general (b. 1905)
- May 3 — Wang Li, linguist, educator, translator and poet (b. 1900)
- June 26 — Gong Zhutong, optical physicist (b. 1904)
- June 30 — Guan Zilan, avant-garde painter (b. 1903)
- July 19 — Wang Shaofang, Huangmei Opera actor (b. 1920)
- July 21 — Zhang Yuzhe, astronomer and director of the Purple Mountain Observatory (b. 1902)
- July 22 — Ren-Chang Ching, botanist (b. 1898)
- July 29 — Deng Jiaxian, nuclear physicist and academician of Chinese Academy of Sciences (b. 1924)
- August 23 — Ren Baige, politician (b. 1906)
- August 29 — Lu Shijia, physicist and aerospace engineer (b. 1911)
- October 3 — Han Xianchu, general (b. 1913)
- October 7 — Liu Bocheng, military commander and Marshal of the People's Liberation Army (b. 1892)
- October 22 — Ye Jianying, 3rd Standing Committee of the National People's Congress of China (b. 1897)
- November 7 — Yang Shangkui, 2nd Secretary of the Jiangxi Provincial Committee of the Chinese Communist Party (b. 1905)
- November 20 — Tang Liang, general (b. 1910)
- November 22 — Chen Manyuan, 2nd Secretary of the Guangxi Zhuang Autonomous Regional Committee of the Chinese Communist Party (b. 1911)
- December 6 — Qian Ning, water conservancy expert (b. 1922)
- December 28 — Huang Kecheng, senior general of the People's Liberation Army (b. 1902)

== See also ==
- 1986 in Chinese film
