= 1976 in China =

- Decades: 1950s; 1960s; 1970s; 1980s; 1990s
- See also: Other events of 1976; History of China • Timeline • Years

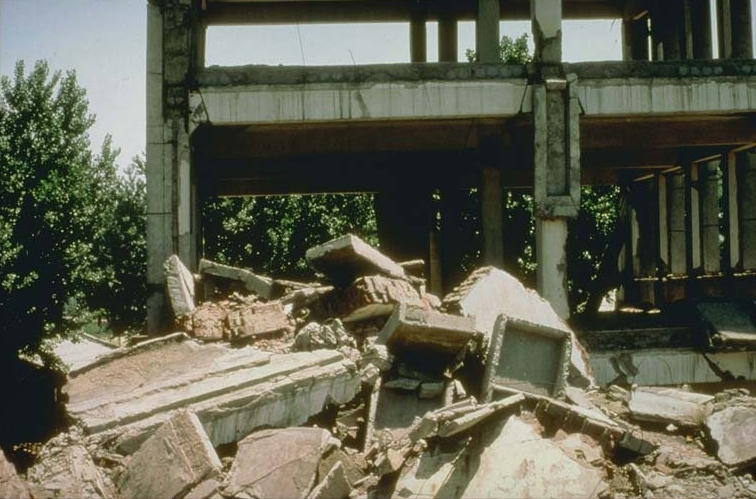
1976 Tangshan earthquake site

Events in the year 1976 in the People's Republic of China.

== Incumbents ==
- Paramount leader — Mao Zedong → Hua Guofeng
- Chairman of the Chinese Communist Party — Mao Zedong → Hua Guofeng
- Premier of the People's Republic of China — Zhou Enlai → Hua Guofeng
- Chairman of the Standing Committee of the National People's Congress — Zhu De → vacant
- Chairman of the Chinese People's Political Consultative Conference — Zhou Enlai → vacant

=== Governors ===
- Governor of Anhui Province – Song Peizhang
- Governor of Fujian Province – Liao Zhigao
- Governor of Gansu Province – Xian Henghan
- Governor of Guangdong Province – Wei Guoqing
- Governor of Guizhou Province – Lu Ruilin
- Governor of Hebei Province – Liu Zihou
- Governor of Heilongjiang Province – Liu Guangtao
- Governor of Henan Province – Liu Jianxun
- Governor of Hubei Province – Zhao Xinchu
- Governor of Hunan Province – Hua Guofeng
- Governor of Jiangsu Province – Peng Chong
- Governor of Jiangxi Province – Jiang Weiqing
- Governor of Jilin Province – Wang Huaixiang
- Governor of Liaoning Province – Zeng Shaoshan
- Governor of Qinghai Province – Liu Xianquan
- Governor of Shaanxi Province – Li Ruishan
- Governor of Shandong Province – Bai Rubing
- Governor of Shanxi Province – Wang Qian
- Governor of Sichuan Province – Zhao Ziyang
- Governor of Yunnan Province – Jia Qiyun
- Governor of Zhejiang Province – Tan Qilong

== Events ==
- January 8 — Zhou Enlai, the 1st Premier of China dies at 78.
- April 5 — A mass gathering and protest occurred on Qingming Festival after the Nanjing incident, was triggered by the death of Zhou Enlai. This was the 1976 Tiananmen incident.
- April 7 — Due to the 1976 Tiananmen incident that occurred earlier, Vice Premier Deng Xiaoping was removed from all his positions in the party.
- April 29 — Sino-Soviet split: A concealed bomb explodes at the gates of the Soviet embassy in China, killing four Chinese. The targets were embassy employees, returning from lunch, but on this day they had returned to the embassy earlier.
- July 6 — Zhu De, the 2nd Chairman of the Standing Committee of the National People's Congress and a prominent figure in the founding of the People's Republic of China dies at 90.
- July 28 — An earthquake hit the region of Tangshan, Hebei Province at 3:42am. This was the 1976 Tangshan earthquake.
- September 9 — Mao Zedong, the 1st Paramount leader of China and Chairman of the Chinese Communist Party dies at 82.
- October 6 — A bloodless coup d'état occurred, leading to the arrest of the Gang of Four, which ended the Cultural Revolution.
- October 12 — Premier Hua Guofeng succeeded Mao Zedong as Chairman of the Chinese Communist Party.

== Deaths ==
- January 8 — Zhou Enlai, 1st Premier of China (b. 1898)
- January 16 — Fan Hanjie, military general in the National Revolutionary Army (b. 1894)
- January 31 — Feng Xuefeng, writer and activist (b. 1903)
- March 26 — Lin Yutang, inventor, linguist, novelist, philosopher and translator (b. 1895)
- March 29 — Cao Diqiu, communist revolutionary and politician (b. 1909)
- April 19 — Shang Xiaoyun, Peking Opera performer (b. 1900)
- May 3 — Li Dazhang, 6th Head of the United Front Work Department (b. 1900)
- May 12 — Yu Jiaju, educator and social advocate (b. 1898)
- June 24 — Liu Wenhui, general and warlord of Sichuan clique during the Republican Era (b. 1895)
- June 26 — Gong Yinbing, banker and politician (b. 1896)
- July 1
  - Zhang Wentian, 4th General Secretary of the Chinese Communist Party (b. 1900)
  - Kwang Pu Chen, banker (b. 1881)
- July 3 — Chen Zizhuang, artist (b. 1913)
- July 6 — Zhu De, 2nd Chairman of the Standing Committee of the National People's Congress (b. 1886)
- July 27 — Ma Ke, composer and musicologist (b. 1918)
- September 9 — Mao Zedong, 1st Paramount leader of China (b. 1893)
- September 29 — Feng Jinglan, mineralogist and geologist (b. 1898)
- October 18 — Guo Xiaochuan, poet (b. 1919)
- December 7 — Zheng Lücheng, composer (b. 1914)
- December 25 — Li Jinfa, poet, sculptor and diplomat (b. 1900)
