= 1973 in China =

- Decades: 1950s; 1960s; 1970s; 1980s; 1990s
- See also: Other events of 1973; History of China • Timeline • Years

Events from the year 1973 in China.

== Incumbents ==
- Chairman of the Chinese Communist Party — Mao Zedong
- President of the People's Republic of China — vacant
- Premier of the People's Republic of China — Zhou Enlai
- Chairman of the National People's Congress — Zhu De
- Vice President of the People's Republic of China — Soong Ch'ing-ling and Dong Biwu
- Vice Premier of the People's Republic of China — Deng Xiaoping

Governors
- Governor of Anhui — Li Desheng
- Governor of Fujian — Han Xianchu
- Governor of Gansu — Xian Henghan
- Governor of Guangdong — Ding Sheng
- Governor of Guizhou — Lan Yinong (until September); Lu Ruilin (September onward)
- Governor of Hebei — Liu Zihou
- Governor of Heilongjiang — Wang Jiadao
- Governor of Henan — Liu Jianxun
- Governor of Hubei — Zeng Siyu (until December); Zhao Xinchu (December)
- Governor of Hunan — Hua Guofeng
- Governor of Jiangsu — Xu Shiyou; later Peng Chong
- Governor of Jiangxi — She Jide
- Governor of Jilin — Wang Huaixiang
- Governor of Liaoning — Chen Xilian (until December); vacant (December)
- Governor of Qinghai — Liu Xianquan
- Governor of Shaanxi — Li Ruishan
- Governor of Shandong — Yang Dezhi
- Governor of Shanxi — Xie Zhenhua
- Governor of Sichuan — Liu Xingyuan
- Governor of Yunnan — Zhou Xing
- Governor of Zhejiang — Nan Ping (until May); Tan Qilong (May onward)

== Events ==
- January — The Yanbian Museum formally opens
- January 15 — The Chinese Rowing Association is founded
- February 6 — Luhuo earthquake: A 7.6 magnitude earthquake occurs in Sichuan, causing extensive destruction and killing 2,204 people
- April 23 — Pingguoyuan station opens
- May — The Chinese Fencing Association is founded
- May 28 — A man suffering from a "nerve disorder" kills his wife and daughter in Xianhu, Wuming, Nanning; he then broke into the village's communal building, killing an additional nine people and injuring nine others, before being lynched by an angry mob
- June — Sungang railway station opens
- August 24–28 — The 10th National Congress of the Chinese Communist Party is held in the Great Hall of the People in Beijing
- September 6 — The Guimin 204 passenger and cargo ship sinks due to strong waves, killing 71 people
- September 14 — Typhoon Marge hits Hainan; 771 people were killed in Qionghai
- November 16 – December 26 — 13 major fires and accidental explosions occur in Guilin, causing serious damage and a high, but unknown, total number of deaths
  - November 24 — An accidental explosion occurs at an explosives factory in Xing'an County, Guilin, causing 23 deaths and 42 injuries
- November 23 — An industrial accident involving potassium chlorate occurs near Liuyang, Hunan, killing 53 people and injuring 37 others

=== Unknown date ===
- Baihe railway station opens
- The Beijing–Yuanping railway begins operations
- CCTV-2 is launched
- The Heilongjiang Winter Sports Training Center opens
- Kaifeng Thermal Power Station begins operations
- The Ningxia Museum opens
- Shigatse Peace Airport opens for military use
- Ürümqi Tianshan International Airport opens

== Births ==
- January 9 — Wang Junxia, long-distance runner
- February 5 — Deng Yaping, table tennis player
- February 27 — Li Bingbing, actress
- November 1 — Li Xiaoshuang, gymnast

== Deaths ==
- January 8 — Dong Xiwen, painter, best known for The Founding Ceremony of the Nation (b. 1914)
- January 16 — Nellie Yu Roung Ling, dancer, lady-in-waiting for Empress Dowager Cixi (b. 1882)
- March 10 — Li Mi, high-ranking Nationalist general (b. 1902)
- April 23 — Mei Ju-ao, jurist, professor, politician, and author (b. 1904)
- April 28 — Yuan Changying, writer (b. 1894)
- June 2 — Zhang Dongsun, philosopher, public intellectual, and political figure (b. 1886)
- July 1 — Zhang Shizhao, journalist, educator, and politician (b. 1881)
- July 19 — Feng Baiju, chief leader of the Hainan Independent Column of the CCP in Hainan Island (b. 1903)
- July 20 — Bruce Lee, Hong Kong-American martial artist, actor, filmmaker, and philosopher (b. 1940)
- September 13 — Sun Fo, politician and high-ranking official in the Kuomintang (b. 1891)
- October 20 — Soong Ai-ling, businesswoman and the eldest of the Soong sisters (b. 1889)

== See also ==
- Chinese films of 1973
