= 1931 in China =

- Decades: 1910s; 1920s; 1930s; 1940s; 1950s
- See also: Other events of 1931; History of China • Timeline • Years

Events in the year 1931 in China.

== Incumbents ==
- Chairman of the Nationalist government: Chiang Kai-shek until December 15, Lin Sen
- Premier: Chiang Kai-shek until December 15, Chen Mingshu
- Vice Premier: Soong Tse-ven until December 16, Chen Mingshu

== Events ==
- March 1 – Early June — Second encirclement campaign against the Honghu Soviet
- April 1 – May 31 — Second encirclement campaign against the Jiangxi Soviet
- April–July — Second encirclement campaign against the Eyuwan Soviet
- July – November — 1931 China floods, one of the deadliest floods in history
- July 1 – September 18 — Third Encirclement Campaign against Jiangxi Soviet
- September 18 — September 18th Incident
- November 4 — Resistance at Nenjiang Bridge
- November 4–18 — Jiangqiao Campaign
- November — Establishment of the Chinese Soviet Republic

== Births ==
- January 2 — Wei Jianxing, member of the 15th Politburo Standing Committee of the Chinese Communist Party (d. 2015)
- January 18 — Huang Jiguang, highly decorated PLA soldier (d. 1952)
- January 22 — Sheng-yen, Taiwanese Buddhist monk, religious scholar and writer (d. 2009)
- February 7 — Liu Yuanfang, nuclear chemist
- February 17 — Wu Jinghua, 7th Secretary of the Tibet Autonomous Regional Committee of the Chinese Communist Party (d. 2007)
- February 25
  - Li Zhensheng, geneticist
  - Joseph Koo, Hong Kong composer (d. 2023)
- April 15 — Kwang-chih Chang, Chinese-American archaeologist and sinologist (d. 2001)
- April 29 — Zhang Taofang, sniper (d. 2007)
- May 8 — Qi Benyu, communist theorist (d. 2016)
- July 6 — Chang Yinfo, mineral deposit geologist (d. 2024)
- July 10 — Morris Chang, Chinese-American billionaire businessman and electric engineer
- July 28 — He Yousheng, hydrodynamicist and mechanical engineer (d. 2018)
- August 9 — Yang Shi'e, engineer (d. 2024)
- October 8 — Fan Ho, photographer, film director and actor (d. 2016)
- October 28 — Qi Kang, architect and artist
- November 2 — Xue Yuqun, hydrogeologist (d. 2021)
- November 3 — Michael Fu Tieshan, Catholic bishop (d. 2007)
- November 11
  - Yan Mingfu, politician (d. 2023)
  - Liu Shahe, writer and poet (d. 2019)
- December 11 — Yao Wenyuan, literary critic, politician and a member of the Gang of Four (d. 2005)

== Deaths ==
- February 3 — Sun Baoqi, 16th Premier of the Republic of China (b. 1867)
- February 7 — Five Martyrs of the League of the Left-Wing Writers
  - Rou Shi, prominent left-wing writer and member of the May Fourth Movement (b. 1902)
  - Hu Yepin, writer, poet and playwright (b. 1903)
  - Feng Keng, poet and author (b. 1907)
- March 22 — Yuan Kewen, scholar and calligrapher (b. 1890)
- April 5
  - Deng Enming, communist revolutionary (b. 1901)
  - Gada Meiren, Mongol leader of an uprising against the sale of Khorchin grasslands to Han settlers (b. 1892)
- May 1 — Mary Elizabeth Wood, American librarian and missionary best known for promoting Western librarianship practices and programs in China (b. 1861)
- June 24 — Xiang Zhongfa, 2nd General Secretary of the Chinese Communist Party (b. 1880)
- July 23 — Ni Kwei-tseng, educator and philanthropist (b. 1869)
- August 4 — Cai Hesen, early leader of the Chinese Communist Party (b. 1895)
- August 5
  - Ma Qi, Chinese Muslim general (b. 1869)
  - Chiang Wei-shui, physician and activist (b. 1890)
- August 31 — Jiang Guangci, fiction writer (b. 1901)
- September 17 — Yang Du, politician (b. 1875)
- November 19 — Xu Zhimo, romantic poet and writer of Modern Chinese poetry (b. 1897)
- November 29 — Deng Yanda, military officer in the National Revolutionary Army (b. 1895)
- December 5 — Song Yuren, reformist philosopher (b. 1857)
