= 1980 in China =

- Decades: 1960s; 1970s; 1980s; 1990s; 2000s
- See also: Other events of 1980; History of China • Timeline • Years

The following lists events in the year 1980 in China.

== Incumbents ==
- Chairman of the Chinese Communist Party – Hua Guofeng
- Chairman of the Congress – Ye Jianying (head of state)
- Premier – Hua Guofeng (until September), Zhao Ziyang (starting September)
- Chairman of the Chinese People's Political Consultative Conference – Deng Xiaoping
- Vice Premier of China – Deng Xiaoping (until September 13), Wan Li (starting September 13)

=== Governors ===
- Governor of Anhui Province – Zhang Jingfu
- Governor of Fujian Province – Ma Xingyuan
- Governor of Gansu Province – Feng Jixin then Li Dengying
- Governor of Guangdong Province – Xi Zhongxun
- Governor of Guizhou Province – Su Gang (starting unknown)
- Governor of Hebei Province – Li Erzhong (starting unknown)
- Governor of Heilongjiang Province – Chen Lei
- Governor of Henan Province – Liu Jie
- Governor of Hubei Province – Chen Pixian then Han Ningfu
- Governor of Hunan Province – Sun Guozhi
- Governor of Jiangsu Province – Hui Yuyu
- Governor of Jiangxi Province – Bai Dongcai
- Governor of Jilin Province – Wang Enmao then Yu Ke
- Governor of Liaoning Province – Chen Puru (starting unknown)
- Governor of Qinghai Province – Zhang Guosheng
- Governor of Shaanxi Province – Yu Mingtao
- Governor of Shandong Province – Su Yiran
- Governor of Shanxi Province – Luo Guibo
- Governor of Sichuan Province – Lu Dadong
- Governor of Yunnan Province – Liu Minghui
- Governor of Zhejiang Province – Li Fengping

== Events ==
- May 20 – Guangming Huaqiao Electronic Industry, as predecessor of Konka Group was founded.

=== Establishments ===
- Central Political and Legal Affairs Commission
- Shenzhen Special Economic Zone
- State Intellectual Property Office
- Tianjin Zoo
- World Economic Herald
- Xiamen Special Economic Zone
- Yan'an Ershilipu Airport
- Zhuhai Special Economic Zone

== Culture ==
- 1980 in Chinese film

== Sport ==
- China at the 1980 Winter Olympics won no medals

== Births ==
- 7 November – Sam Chui, Chinese-Australian aviation and travel blogger, photographer, and author

== Deaths ==
- March 10 — Zhang Fakui, nationalist general (b. 1896)
- June 25 — An Ziwen, politician and a member of the Central Committee of the Chinese Communist Party (b. 1909)
- July 3 — Deng Hua, general in the People's Liberation Army (b. 1910)
- July 25 — Wang Jian'an, military official and general in the People's Liberation Army (b. 1908)
- August 1 — Guan Linzheng, nationalist general (b. 1905)
- October 10 — Zhao Dan, film actor (b. 1915)
- December 25 — Gu Jiegang, folklorist, historian and sinologist (b. 1893)
