= 1971 in China =

- Decades: 1950s; 1960s; 1970s; 1980s; 1990s
- See also: Other events of 1971; History of China • Timeline • Years

Events from the year 1971 in China.

== Incumbents ==
- Chairman of the Chinese Communist Party – Mao Zedong
- President of China – vacant
- Premier of China – Zhou Enlai
- Chairman of the National People's Congress – Zhu De
- Vice President of China – Soong Ching-ling and Dong Biwu
- Vice Premier of China – Lin Biao (until 13 September), Deng Xiaoping (starting 13 September)

=== Governors ===
- Governor of Anhui Province – Li Desheng
- Governor of Fujian Province – Han Xianchu
- Governor of Gansu Province – Song Ping
- Governor of Guangdong Province – Liu Xingyuan
- Governor of Guizhou Province – Ma Li
- Governor of Hebei Province – Li Zaihe then Liu Zihou
- Governor of Heilongjiang Province – Pan Fusheng then Wang Jiadao
- Governor of Henan Province – Liu Jianxun
- Governor of Hubei Province – Zeng Siyu
- Governor of Hunan Province – Hua Guofeng
- Governor of Jiangsu Province – Xu Shiyou
- Governor of Jiangxi Province – Cheng Shiqing then She Jide
- Governor of Jilin Province – Wang Huaixiang
- Governor of Liaoning Province – Chen Xilian
- Governor of Qinghai Province – Liu Xianquan
- Governor of Shaanxi Province – Li Ruishan
- Governor of Shandong Province – Yang Dezhi (starting unknown)
- Governor of Shanxi Province – Liu Geping then Xie Zhenhua
- Governor of Sichuan Province – Zhang Guohua
- Governor of Yunnan Province – Zhou Xing
- Governor of Zhejiang Province – Nan Ping

== Events ==
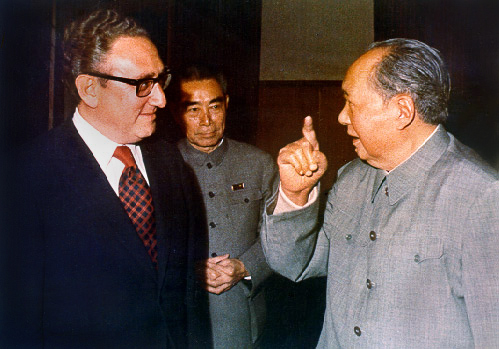
Kissinger, shown here with Zhou Enlai and Mao Zedong, negotiated rapprochement with China.

- China tested its intercontinental DF-5 missile in 1971.

=== March ===
- March 26 – Cameroon and the People's Republic of China established bilateral relations.

=== May ===
- May 26 – Austria and the People's Republic of China establish diplomatic relations.

=== June ===
- June 10 – The U.S. ends its trade embargo of China.

=== September ===
- September 13 – The Chinese Communist military leader Lin Biao dies in a plane crash in Mongolia after what appeared to be a failed coup to oust Mao. After his death, he was officially condemned as a traitor.

=== October ===
- October 25 – The United Nations General Assembly admits the People's Republic of China and expels the Republic of China (Taiwan).

=== November ===
- November 23 – The People's Republic of China takes the Republic of China's seat on the United Nations Security Council (see China and the United Nations).
- Henry Kissinger secretly visits Beijing

== Births ==
- January 26 – Li Ming, Chinese footballer and football executive
- April – Joseph Zhang Yinlin, priest and the bishop of Weihui
- June 22 – Dao Lang, Chinese musician
- October 29 – Ma Huateng, Chinese business magnate, founder of Tencent
- November 12 – Chen Guangcheng, Chinese civil rights activist

== Deaths ==
- January 27 — Weng Wenhao, geologist and politician (b. 1889)
- April 25 — T.V. Soong, businessman, banker and politician (b. 1894)
- April 29 — Li Siguang, geologist and founder of China's geomechanics (b. 1889)
- June 15 — Xie Juezai, 3rd President of the Supreme People's Court (b. 1884)
- September 13 — Lin Biao Incident
  - Lin Biao, 2nd Minister of National Defence and Vice Chairman of the Chinese Communist Party (b. 1907)
  - Ye Qun, politician and wife of Lin Biao (b. 1917)
  - Lin Liguo, son of Lin Biao (b. 1945)
- October 27 — Zhang Jingwu, politician and lieutenant general of the People's Liberation Army (b. 1906)

== See also ==
- 1971 in Chinese film
