= 1893 in China =

- Decades: 1870s; 1880s; 1890s; 1900s; 1910s
- See also: Other events of 1893; History of China • Timeline • Years

Events from the year 1893 in China.

== Incumbents ==
- Guangxu Emperor (19th year)

== Events ==
- November 29 — establishment of Wuhan University

== Births ==
- January 9 — Gu Zhutong, nationalist general and administrator (d. 1987)
- January 27 — Soong Ching-ling, Honorary Chairwoman of China and wife of Sun Yat-sen (d. 1981)
- February 2
  - Sun Lianzhong, nationalist general (d. 1990)
  - Damdin Sükhbaatar, Mongolian communist revolutionary (d. 1923)
- March 18 — Bai Chongxi, 1st Minister of National Defense of the Republic of China (d. 1966)
- May 8 — Gu Jiegang, folklorist, historian and sinologist (d. 1980)
- May 30 — Zhu Jiahua, scientist, geologist and nationalist politician (d. 1963)
- June 15 — Zhang Shenfu, philosopher and political activist (d. 1986)
- July 4 — Wang Mingzhang, nationalist general (d. 1938)
- July 10 — Wang Jialie, former Chairman of Guizhou (d. 1966)
- August 4 — Tang Yongtong, educator, philosopher and scholar (d. 1964)
- August 17 — Abing, musician (d. 1950)
- August 25 — Tu Tsung-ming, Taiwanese pharmacologist and educator (d. 1986)
- October 1 — Ip Man, martial arts grandmaster (d. 1972)
- October 18
  - Liang Shuming, philosopher, politician and writer in the Rural Reconstruction Movement (d. 1988)
  - Lee Kong Chian, prominent Singaporean Chinese businessman and philanthropist (d. 1967)
- October 20 — Xiong Qinglai, mathematician (d. 1969)
- November 26 — Yang Hucheng, general during the Warlord era (d. 1949)
- December 26 — Mao Zedong, 1st Paramount Leader of China (d. 1976)

=== Date unknown ===
- Van Chu-Lin, New Zealand homemaker and storekeeper (d. 1946)

== Deaths ==
- March 26 — Chonghou, official and diplomat (b. 1826)
