= 1972 in China =

- Decades: 1950s; 1960s; 1970s; 1980s; 1990s
- See also: Other events of 1972; History of China • Timeline • Years

Events from the year 1972 in China.

== Incumbents ==
- Chairman of the Chinese Communist Party – Mao Zedong
- President of the People's Republic of China – vacant
- Premier of the People's Republic of China – Zhou Enlai
- Chairman of the National People's Congress – Zhu De
- Vice President of the People's Republic of China – Soong Ching-ling and Dong Biwu
- Vice Premier of the People's Republic of China – Deng Xiaoping

=== Governors ===
- Governor of Anhui Province – Li Desheng
- Governor of Fujian Province – Han Xianchu
- Governor of Gansu Province – Xian Henghan
- Governor of Guangdong Province – Liu Xingyuan (until April), Ding Sheng (starting April)
- Governor of Guizhou Province – Lan Yinong
- Governor of Hebei Province – Liu Zihou
- Governor of Heilongjiang Province – Wang Jiadao
- Governor of Henan Province – Liu Jianxun
- Governor of Hubei Province – Zeng Siyu
- Governor of Hunan Province – Hua Guofeng
- Governor of Jiangsu Province – Xu Shiyou
- Governor of Jiangxi Province – Cheng Shiqing then She Jide
- Governor of Jilin Province – Wang Huaixiang
- Governor of Liaoning Province – Chen Xilian
- Governor of Qinghai Province – Liu Xianquan
- Governor of Shaanxi Province – Li Ruishan
- Governor of Shandong Province – Yang Dezhi
- Governor of Shanxi Province – Xie Zhenhua
- Governor of Sichuan Province – Zhang Guohua (until March), Liu Xingyuan (starting March)
- Governor of Yunnan Province – Zhou Xing
- Governor of Zhejiang Province – Nan Ping

== Events ==
- January 6 — China's foreign minister Chen Yi dies at 71.
- February 21–28 — U.S. President Richard Nixon makes an 8-day visit to the People's Republic of China. The visit symbolize the normalization of China–United States relations.
- February 27 — The Shanghai Communiqué was signed and issued by the governments of the People's Republic of China and the United States.
- February 28 — The Three Communiqués summarizes the landmark dialogue begun by President Richard Nixon and Premier Zhou Enlai . Some of the issues addressed in this communiqué include the two sides' views on Vietnam, the Korean Peninsula, India and Pakistan and the Kashmir region, and perhaps most importantly, the Taiwan (Republic of China) issue (i.e., Taiwan's political status).
- April 10 — Construction workers in Shandong discovered tombs containing bamboo slips which among them, is the Sun Tzu's Art of War and Sun Bin's lost military treatise.
- June 22–30 — Typhoon Ora strucks the Philippines and Southern China.
- August 1 — The 45th anniversary celebrations of the founding of the People's Liberation Army.
- September 25–29 — Japanese Prime Minister Masayoshi Ōhira makes a visit to China.
- September 29 — The Japan-China Joint Communiqué is signed between China and Japan which started the normalization of China-Japan relations.
- December 22 — Australia establishes diplomatic relations with the People's Republic of China.

== Births ==
- Kang Hui
- Zheng Yongshan
- Liang Qin
- Xiao Jiangang
- Hu Haifeng

== Deaths ==
- January 6 — Chen Yi, 2nd Minister of Foreign Affairs (b. 1901)
- January 9 — Liang Sicheng, architect and architectural historian (b. 1901)
- January 19 — Gao Shuxun, general from Zhili Province (b. 1898)
- February 15 — Edgar Snow, American journalist known for his books and articles on communism in China and the Chinese Communist Revolution (b. 1905)
- February 21 — Zhang Guohua, politician and lieutenant general in the People's Liberation Army (b. 1914)
- March 18 — Xu Bing, 5th Head of the United Front Work Department (b. 1903)
- March 26 — Xie Fuzhi, military commander, political commissar and national security specialist (b. 1909)
- April 6 — Chen Zhengren, politician (b. 1907)
- April 16 — Zeng Shan, communist military commander and security minister (b. 1899)
- April 23 — Li Dequan, 1st Minister of Health (b. 1896)
- July 25 — Baren, modern writer, critic and translator (b. 1901)
- September 1 — He Xiangning, revolutionary, feminist, politician, painter and poet (b. 1878)
- December 2 — Ip Man, martial arts grandmaster (b. 1893)
- December 10 — Deng Zihui, communist revolutionary and one of the most influential leaders of the People's Republic of China (b. 1896)

== See also ==
- 1972 in Chinese film
