= 1885 in China =

- Decades: 1860s; 1870s; 1880s; 1890s; 1900s
- See also: Other events of 1885; History of China • Timeline • Years

Events in the year 1885 in China.

== Incumbents ==
- Guangxu Emperor (11th year)
  - Regent: Empress Dowager Cixi

=== Viceroys ===
- Viceroy of Zhili — Li Hongzhang
- Viceroy of Min-Zhe — Yang Changjun
- Viceroy of Huguang — Bian Baodi then Yulu
- Viceroy of Shaan-Gan — Tan Zhonglin
- Viceroy of Liangguang — Zhang Zhidong
- Viceroy of Yun-Gui — Cen Yuying
- Viceroy of Sichuan — Ding Baozhen
- Viceroy of Liangjiang — Zeng Guoquan

== Events ==
- Sino-French War
  - January 3–4 — Battle of Núi Bop
  - February 3–13 — Lạng Sơn Campaign
  - February 14 — Battle of Shipu
  - February 23 — Battle of Đồng Đăng
  - March 1 — Battle of Zhenhai
  - March 2 — Battle of Hòa Mộc
  - March 23 — Battle of Phu Lam Tao
  - March 24 — Battle of Bang Bo (Zhennan Pass)
  - June 9 — Treaty of Tientsin (1885), Sino-French War ends

== Births ==
- January 16 — Zhou Zuoren, writer and brother of Lu Xun (d. 1967)
- April 17 — Sun Chuanfang, warlord in the Zhili clique (d. 1935)
- April 27 — Ma Xulun, politician, activist and linguist (d. 1970)
- April 28 — Qi Xieyuan, warlord in the Zhili clique (d. 1946)
- May 20 — Zaixun, Manchu noble of the late Qing Dynasty (d. 1949)
- October 30 — Song Zheyuan, general (d. 1940)
- November 5 — Li Jishen, military officer and politician (d. 1959)
- November 11 — Su Zhaozheng, labour movement activist and early leader of the Chinese Communist Party (d. 1929)
- November 30 — Ma Zhanshan, general in the Northeastern army (d. 1950)

== Deaths ==
- June 15 — Consort Qing, consort of Emperor Xianfeng (b. 1840)
- July 21 — Zaicheng, Manchu noble (b. 1858)
- September 5 — Zuo Zongtang, former Viceroy of Liangjiang, Shaan-Gan and Min-Zhe (b. 1812)
- December 6 — Hu Xueyan, businessman (b. 1823)

=== Dates unknown ===
- Lin Hongnian, politician, writer and calligrapher (b. 1805)
- Zeng Fengnian, military figure (b. 1809)
