= Shi Ruwei =

Chinese physicist

Shi Ruwei (Chinese: 施汝为; November 19, 1901 – January 18, 1983) was a Chinese physicist, who was a member of the Chinese Academy of Sciences.
