= An Yiru =

Chinese writer

An Yiru (Chinese: 安意如, born 20 June 1984) is the pen name for a modern-day freelance writer Zhang Li. Her works often revolve around love stories. She has been accused of plagiarism.

== Works ==
- 《人生若只如初见》
- 《当时只道是寻常》
- 《思无邪》
- 《陌上花开缓缓归》（ 再版后书名改为《陌上花开》）
- 《惜春纪》
- 《美人何处》
- 《世有桃花》
- 《要定你，言承旭》
- 《看张·爱玲画语》
