= Gu Yun =

This page is about Gu Yun, the Chinese artist. For the member of Ice Creamusume, see Gu Yun (singer).

Gu Yun (traditional Chinese: 顧沄; simplified Chinese: 顾沄; pinyin: Gù Yún; Wade–Giles: Ku Yün, (1835–1896) was a Chinese master landscape artist. His courtesy name was Ruopo (trad. chars. 雲壺, simpl. chars. 若波, “Like Waves”). His pen name was Yunhu (云壶, “Cloud Vase”).

Gu was a native of the cultural mecca of Suzhou, but eventually joined the community of artists in Shanghai. He must have had access to local collections of old masters because his paintings show a mastery of classical themes. His paintings clearly show a profound respect for and influence from 17th century academic masters such as the “Four Wangs” and others. Gu's works are noted for the distinctive use of ink tones, although some criticized his work as lacking in vitality. He traveled to Japan in 1888 where he sojourned at the official Qing Embassy. On his journey to Kyoto, Gu nearly forced by a flood to remain at Nagoya. This was a loss for Japanese art that happened in 1889. After his death, Gu's reputation soared, but unfortunately the best collection of his landscapes in Japan perished in the fires of the Great Kantō earthquake in 1923. Noted works of the artist are extant there however. A printed selection of his paintings appeared in 1926.
