= Van Chu-Lin =

New Zealand homemaker and storekeeper

Van Chu-Lin (1893–1946) was a notable New Zealand homemaker and storekeeper. She was born in Canton, China in about 1893.
