= Wu Xuezhou =

Wu Xuezhou (Chinese: 吴学周; September 20, 1902 – October 31, 1983) was a Chinese chemist. He was a member of the Chinese Academy of Sciences.
