= Yu Hongzheng =

Chinese chemist (1897–1966)

Yu Hongzheng (Chinese: 虞宏正; October 5, 1897 – November 11, 1966) was a Chinese chemist. He was a member of the Chinese Academy of Sciences.
