= Ji Yufeng =

Chinese chemist

Ji Yufeng (Chinese: 纪育沣; December 22, 1899 – May 18, 1982) was a Chinese chemist. He was a member of the Chinese Academy of Sciences.
