= Shaoxing Senior High School =

School in Shaoxing, Zhejiang, China

Coordinates: 29°59′44.74″N 120°35′09.99″E

Shaoxing Senior High School (Chinese: 绍兴市高级中学; pinyin: Shàoxīngshì Gāojí Zhōngxué), founded in 1956, was originally named Shaoxing County Sixth Junior High School. The school covers almost 200 acres (81 ha). Buildings occupy 75,025 square meters, with a total cost of 120 million yuan. Two hundred thirty teachers with Bachelor's degrees offer 75 classes.

The school was rebuilt in 2003.
