= Zhan Dabei =

Chinese revolutionary and politician

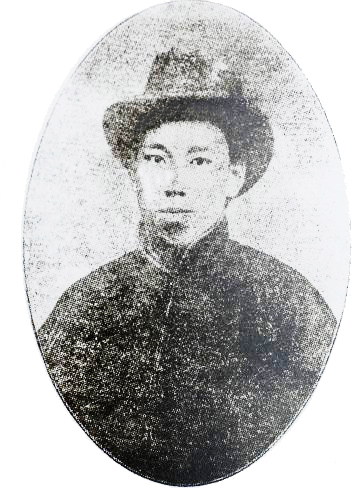
- Chinese: 詹大悲
Transcriptions
Standard Mandarin
- Hanyu Pinyin: Zhān Dàbēi
- Wade–Giles: Chan Ta-pei

Zhan Dabei (1888-1927) was a Chinese revolutionary and politician. He was an anti-Manchu rebel active at the time of the 1911 Revolution. He later became a left-wing member of the Nationalist Party, or KMT, and was executed as a Communist partisan in 1927.

== Early life ==
Zhan was born in Qizhun in Hubei Province in 1888. Zhan's family had a scholarly background. Even as a boy, Zhan was recognized for his memory and literary talent. In the examination to enter middle school, he scored first place of 20,000 applicants. He was also the youngest of all the applicants. Nonetheless, he was expelled from the school soon after enrolling, possibly due to his rebellious attitude.

== Career as revolutionary ==
A schoolmate recommended Zhan to be a member of the Tongmenghui, a revolutionary party headed by Sun Yat-sen. Zhan edited journals and attempted to convert military officers in Hubei to the revolutionary cause. When the railways were nationalized in 1911, many investors protested. As a leftist, Zhan supported nationalization in principle, but class warfare and leftist principles did not stop Zhan from siding with the bourgeois investors against the government. In an article entitled “Rebellion is the cure for China,” he proclaimed the Manchu government illegitimate. He was arrested and sentenced to eighteen months in prison. The sentence gave him nationwide public attention and made him a hero of the revolutionary movement. He was freed in October upon the outbreak of the Revolution of 1911. Once freed, Zhan was selected leader by a group of revolutionaries in Hankou, capital of Hubei and now part of Wuhan. Zhan then ordered the execution of the Qing commander of the Hankou garrison.

After the 1913 parliamentary election, the Tongmenghui merged with several smaller parties to form the KMT. Zhan was slated to be speaker of the Hubei provincial assembly. When KMT leader Song Jiaoren was assassinated in March 1913, the KMT was banned and Zhan became a revolutionary plotter once more. He was arrested in Shanghai in 1915 and imprisoned at the International Settlement. He was released when President Yuan Shikai died in 1916.

In 1920, Zhan went to Guangzhou and became a propaganda officer in Sun Yat-sen's southern government. He was a delegate to the First National Congress of the Chinese Nationalist Party, or reorganized KMT, in January 1924. After Sun died in 1925, Zhan sided with KMT leader Wang Jingwei. Wang was allied with the Chinese Communist Party, which was directed by Soviet adviser Mikhail Borodin. Zhan became an alternate member of the KMT executive committee in January 1926.

In May 1926, KMT military commander Chiang Kai-shek forced Wang to take a family vacation to Europe. Advancing northward, KMT forces captured Wuhan in October and Nanchang in November. In December, left-wing leaders began to meet in Wuhan while a rival anti-Communist faction formed at Chiang's military headquarters in Nanchang. Zhan served as finance commissioner for the Wuhan faction. Wang returned from Europe in April 1927 to lead the Wuhan faction.

In March 1927, the KMT captured both Shanghai and Nanjing. In April, Chiang and other right-wing KMT leaders set up a National Government in Nanjing and ordered a purge of Communists. Zhan's name was on the list of those to be purged. A Communist uprising that began on August 1 spurred reconciliation between the KMT's rival factions. Wang and the other KMT leftists abandoned Wuhan for Nanjing in September. Meanwhile, Zhan remained in his native province with the Communists. He was arrested in late 1927 by soldiers under the command of Hu Zongduo and executed.

Zhan was survived by his wife, by his son Zhan Shihua, and by his daughter Zhan Zhifang.
