= 1886 in China =

- Decades: 1860s; 1870s; 1880s; 1890s; 1900s
- See also: Other events of 1886; History of China • Timeline • Years

Events in the year 1886 in China.

== Incumbents ==
- Emperor: Guangxu Emperor (12th year)

=== Viceroys ===
- Viceroy of Zhili — Li Hongzhang
- Viceroy of Min-Zhe — Yang Changjun
- Viceroy of Huguang — Yulu
- Viceroy of Shaan-Gan — Tan Zhonglin
- Viceroy of Liangguang — Zhang Zhidong
- Viceroy of Yun-Gui — Cen Yuying
- Viceroy of Sichuan — Ding Baozhen then Liu Bingzhang
- Viceroy of Liangjiang — Zeng Guoquan

== Births ==
- March 5 — Dong Biwu, 2nd Vice President of China (d. 1975)
- March 20 — Lin Boqu, politician and poet (d. 1960)
- September 28 — Tan Pingshan, early member of the Chinese Communist Party (d. 1956)
- October 11 — Shao Piaoping, journalist, author and political activist (d. 1926)
- December 1 — Zhu De, 2nd Chairman of the Standing Committee of the National People's Congress (d. 1976)
- December 9 — Zhang Dongsun, philosopher, public intellectual and political figure (d. 1973)

=== Dates unknown ===
- Fang Shengdong, revolutionary figure (d. 1911)
- Anandyn Amar, 7th Prime Minister of Mongolia (d. 1941)

== Deaths ==
- February 13 — Yixiang, Prince Hui of the Second Rank (b. 1849)
- February 21 — Ma Zhan'ao, Chinese Muslim general (b. 1830)
- April 21 — Ding Baozhen, 86th Viceroy of Sichuan (b. 1821)
