= 1900 in China =

- Decades: 1880s; 1890s; 1900s; 1910s; 1920s
- See also: Other events of 1900; History of China • Timeline • Years

Events in the year 1900 in China.

== Incumbents ==
- Guangxu Emperor (26th year)

=== Viceroys ===
- Viceroy of Zhili — Yulu then Li Hongzhang
- Viceroy of Min-Zhe — Xu Yingkui
- Viceroy of Huguang — Zhang Zhidong
- Viceroy of Shaan-Gan — Wei Guangtao then Songfan
- Viceroy of Liangguang — Deshou then Li Hongzhang then Lu Chuanlin then Tao Mo
- Viceroy of Yun-Gui — Songfan then Wei Guangtao
- Viceroy of Sichuan — Kuijun
- Viceroy of Liangjiang — Liu Kunyi

== Events ==
=== January ===
- January 15 — Li Hongzhang, Viceroy of Liangguang, visited Hong Kong and met with Governor Henry Arthur Blake.

=== March ===
- March 27 — Li Hongzhang, Viceroy of Liangguang, provinces reported to the central government that some of the gangsters in Hong Kong wanted to attack the provincial capital, and secretly demanded that the Governor of Hong Kong to ban.

=== June ===
- June 10–28 — Seymour Expedition
- June 16–17 — Battle of Dagu Forts (1900)
- June — Zhang Decheng went to see the Viceroy of Zhili, Yu Lu. He presented himself to him as the founder of the Boxer movement, and the viceroy promised to provide the Boxers with money and equipment.[2]
- June 20 – August 14 — Siege of the International Legations
- June Taiyuan Nationalist reaction in China against Christian missionaries and churches claimed more than thirty-two thousand lives. The worst massacres occurred in the northern province of Shanxi, particularly Taiyuan.

=== July ===
- July 13–14 — Battle of Tientsin

=== August ===
- August — Gaselee Expedition
- August 5 — Battle of Beicang
- August 6 — Battle of Yangcun
- August 14–15 — Battle of Peking (1900)

=== September ===
- September 20 — Battle of Beitang

=== Other events ===
- Boxer Rebellion
  - Battle of Shanhaiguan (1900)
  - Boxers attacks on Chinese Eastern Railway
  - Defence of Yingkou
  - Battle of Pai-t'ou-tzu
  - Battles on Amur River (1900)
  - Russian Invasion of Northern and Central Manchuria (1900)

== Births ==
- January 5 — Xun Huisheng, one of the four great 20th-century performers of the Dan role in Peking opera (d. 1968)
- January 7 — Shang Xiaoyun, one of the four great 20th-century performers of the Dan role in Peking opera (d. 1976)
- May 14 — Cai Chang, politician and women's rights activist (d. 1990)
- May 22 — Li Fuchun, former vice premier of China (d. 1975)
- June 17 — Xu Haidong, senior general of the People's Liberation Army (d. 1970)
- June 30 — Zhang Wentian, 4th General Secretary of the Chinese Communist Party (d. 1976)
- July 21 - Sue Wah Chin, Chinese-born Australian entrepreneur (d. 2000 in Australia)
- August 10 — Wang Li, linguist, educator, translator and poet (d. 1986)
- August 21 — Chen Lifu, nationalist politician (d. 2001)
- August 25 — Xia Minghan, early leader of the Chinese Communist Revolution (d. 1928)
- September 9
  - Zhou Shidi, general of the People's Liberation Army (d. 1979)
  - Huang Baitao, nationalist general (d. 1948)
- September 27 — Zhu Liangcai, general of the People's Liberation Army (d. 1989)
- October 5 — Bing Xin, one of the most prolific Chinese women writers of the 20th century (d. 1999)
- October 30 — Xia Yan, playwright and screenwriter (d. 1995)
- November 22 — Lin Fengmian, painter (d. 1991)
- December 8 — Sun Li-jen, nationalist general (d. 1990)

== Deaths ==
- July 9 — Nie Shicheng, general (b. 1836)
- July 22 — Chen Baozhen, statesman and reformer (b. 1831)
- July 28
  - Xu Jingcheng, diplomat (b. 1845)
  - Yuan Chang, politician and poet (b. 1846)
- August 11
  - Lishan, politician (b. 1843)
  - Xu Yongyi, politician (b. 1826)
  - Lianyuan, official (b. 1838)
- August 13 — Ma Fulu, Chinese Muslim general (b. 1854)
- August 14 — Wang Yirong, director of the Chinese Imperial Academy (b. 1845)
- August 15 — Imperial Noble Consort Keshun, consort of Emperor Guangxu (b. 1876)
- August 22 — Tang Caichang, revolutionary and political activist (b. 1867)
- August 26 — Chongqi, official (b. 1829)

=== Dates unknown ===
- Ma Haiyan, Chinese Muslim general (b. 1837)
- Cheng Tinghua, renowned master of Chinese neijia (b. 1848)
- Gangyi, politician (b. 1837)
- Guo Yunshen, xingyiquan master (b. 1829)
- Li Bingheng, military figure and statesman (b. 1830)
- Xu Tong, official (b. 1819)
- Yulu, statesman (b. 1844)
- Zhang Decheng, nationalist and leader of the Boxer movement (b. 1846)
- Zhang Yinhuan, 3rd Chinese Ambassador to the United States (b. 1837)
