= 1888 in China =

- Decades: 1860s; 1870s; 1880s; 1890s; 1900s
- See also: Other events of 1888; History of China • Timeline • Years

Events in the year 1888 in China.

== Incumbents ==
- Guangxu Emperor (14th year)
  - Regent: Empress Dowager Cixi

=== Viceroys ===
- Viceroy of Zhili — Li Hongzhang
- Viceroy of Min-Zhe — Yang Changjun then Bian Baodi
- Viceroy of Huguang — Yulu
- Viceroy of Shaan-Gan — Tan Zhonglin then Yang Changjun
- Viceroy of Liangguang — Zhang Zhidong
- Viceroy of Yun-Gui — Cen Yuying
- Viceroy of Sichuan — Liu Bingzhang
- Viceroy of Liangjiang — Zeng Guoquan

== Events ==
- Sikkim expedition, an 1888 British military expedition to expel Tibetan forces from Sikkim in present-day northeast India.
- March 12 — Qing government signed a treaty with the US banning Chinese laborers from entering the US in accordance with the Chinese Exclusion Act
- Lingnan University established in Canton, Kwangtung Province, China (now Guangzhou, Guangdong Province, People's Republic of China). It was a private university established by a group of American missionaries in 1888
- October 1 — The Scott Act (1888) signed into law, was a United States law that prohibited Chinese laborers abroad or who planned future travels from returning, met with opposition in China, especially Guangdong

== Births ==
- Zhan Dabei (1888, Hubei - 1927) was a Chinese revolutionary and politician. He was an anti-Manchu rebel active at the time of the 1911 Revolution
