= 1896 in China =

- Decades: 1870s; 1880s; 1890s; 1900s; 1910s
- See also: Other events of 1896; History of China • Timeline • Years

Events in the year 1896 in China.

== Incumbents ==
- Guangxu Emperor (22nd year)

== Events ==
- By 1896, China showed interest in Aksai Chin, reportedly a result of Russian instigation.
- February — Russo-Chinese Bank, opened a Shanghai branch.
- August 28 — The Chinese government partnered with the Russo-Chinese Bank to construct the China Eastern Railway. The bank was renamed Sino-Russian Righteousness Victory Bank (Traditional Chinese: 華俄道勝銀行).
- Dungan Revolt (1895–96), a rebellion of various Chinese Muslim ethnic groups in Qinghai and Gansu against the Qing dynasty

== Births ==
- January 4 — Chen Tanqiu, politician and founding member of the Chinese Communist Party (d. 1943)
- January 9 — Mao Yisheng, structural engineer and social activist (d. 1989)
- February 18 — Li Linsi, educator, diplomat and scholar (d. 1970)
- March 16 — Liu Haisu, painter and art educator (d. 1994)
- March 19 — Luo Zhuoying, nationalist general (d. 1961)
- March 22 — He Long, communist revolutionary and a Marshal of the People's Republic of China (d. 1969)
- March 26 — Fu Ssu-nien, historian, linguist and writer (d. 1950)
- April 3 — Mao Zemin, communist revolutionary (d. 1943)
- May 16 — Hu Zongnan, nationalist general (d. 1962)
- June 2 — Li Weihan, communist politician (d. 1984)
- July 4 — Mao Dun, novelist, essayist, journalist, playwright, literary and cultural critic (d. 1981)
- July 12 — Li Ji, archaeologist (d. 1979)
- July 30 — Luo Longji, politician and intellectual (d. 1965)
- August 17 — Deng Zihui, communist revolutionary and one of the influential leaders of the People's Republic of China (d. 1972)
- September 2 — Zhang Fakui, 3rd Commander-in-Chief of the Republic of China Army (d. 1980)
- September 10 — Ye Ting, military officer (d. 1946)
- September 22 — Yu Hanmou, 2nd Commander-in-Chief of the Republic of China Army (d. 1981)
- October 11 — Wang Ruofei, high-ranking member of the Chinese Communist Party (d. 1946)
- October 22 — Peng Pai, pioneer of the Chinese agrarian movement and a leading revolutionary in the Chinese Communist Party (d. 1929)
- December 7 — Yu Dafu, short story writer and poet (d. 1945)
- December 26 — Xue Yue, nationalist general (d. 1998)

== Deaths ==
- January 12 — Liu Mingchuan, military general and politician (b. 1836)
- April 23 — Wu Xun, educational reformer (b. 1838)
- June 17 — Wanzhen, consort of Yixuan (b. 1841)

=== Unknown dates ===
- Xu Gu, painter and poet (b. 1824)
- Ren Bonian, painter (b. 1840)
- Gu Yun, master landscape artist (b. 1835)
- Liu Shiduan, leader of the Big Swords Society (b. 1853)
