= 1895 in China =

- Decades: 1870s; 1880s; 1890s; 1900s; 1910s
- See also: Other events of 1895; History of China • Timeline • Years

Events in the year 1895 in China.

== Incumbents ==
- Guangxu Emperor (21st year)

== Events ==
- January 20 – February 12 – First Sino-Japanese War: Battle of Weihaiwei
- March 4 – First Sino-Japanese War: Battle of Yingkou
- April 17 – Treaty of Shimonoseki with Empire of Japan
  - islands of Taiwan and Penghu ceded to Japan
- April 23 – Triple Intervention by Russian Empire, German Empire and French Third Republic.
- May 5 – Prime Minister of Japan Ito Hirobumi announces withdrawal of Japanese troops from Liaodong Peninsula
- May–October – Taiwanese Resistance to Japanese Invasion
- August 1 – Kucheng Massacre
- Dungan Revolt (1895–96), a rebellion of various Chinese Muslim ethnic groups in Qinghai and Gansu against the Qing dynasty

== Births ==
- January 10 — Liu Wenhui, general and warlord of the Sichuan clique (d. 1976)
- February 8 — Khorloogiin Choibalsan, 1st leader of the Mongolian People's Republic (d. 1952)
- February 24 — Liu Tianhua, musician and composer (d. 1932)
- March 1 — Deng Yanda, military officer in the National Revolutionary Army (d. 1931)
- March 30 — Cai Hesen, early leader of the Chinese Communist Party (d. 1931)
- June 2 — Fu Zuoyi, military leader (d. 1974)
- June 27 — Jamsrangiin Sambuu, 9th Chairman of the Presidium of the State Great Khural of the Mongolian People's Republic (d. 1972)
- July 19 — Xu Beihong, painter (d. 1953)
- July 30 — Ch'ien Mu, historian, philosopher and writer (d. 1990)
- September 25 — Qian Zhuangfei, doctor, film director and secret agent for the Chinese Communist Party (d. 1935)
- October 10 — Lin Yutang, inventor, linguist, novelist, philosopher and translator (d. 1976)
- October 18 — Ji Hongchang, general and patriot (d. 1934)
- November 23 — Fang Chih, Taiwanese politician and diplomat (d. 1989)
- November 26 — Peng Shuzhi, early leader of the Chinese Communist Party (d. 1983)
- December 1 — Huang Shaohong, warlord of the New Guangxi Clique (d. 1966)
- December 14 — Nan Hanchen, 1st Governor of the People's Bank of China (d. 1967)
- Wang Fengge

== Deaths ==
- February 10 — Liu Buchan, naval officer (b. 1852)
- February 12 — Ding Ruchang, admiral of Beiyang Fleet (b. 1836)
- May 15 — Consort Lu, consort of Emperor Xianfeng (b. 1841)
- November 7 — Lu Haodong, revolutionary (b. 1868)
- Zhu Hongzhang
