= 1897 in China =

- Decades: 1870s; 1880s; 1890s; 1900s; 1910s
- See also: Other events of 1897; History of China • Timeline • Years

Events from the year 1897 in China.

== Incumbents ==
- Guangxu Emperor (23rd year)

=== Viceroys ===
- Viceroy of Zhili — Wang Wenshao
- Viceroy of Min-Zhe — Bian Baoquan
- Viceroy of Huguang — Zhang Zhidong
- Viceroy of Shaan-Gan — Tao Mo
- Viceroy of Liangguang — Tan Zhonglin
- Viceroy of Yun-Gui — Songfan
- Viceroy of Sichuan — Lu Chuanlin then Gongshou then Li Bingheng then Yulu
- Viceroy of Liangjiang — Liu Kunyi

== Events ==
- Red Revenue incident, Chinese revenue stamps were overprinted (surcharged) and subsequently used as postage stamps in 1897

== Births ==
- January 15 — Xu Zhimo, romantic poet and writer of modern Chinese poetry (d. 1931)
- February 16 — Wei Lihuang, general (d. 1960)
- April 28 — Ye Jianying, 3rd Chairman of the Standing Committee of the National People's Congress (d. 1986)
- May 28 — Dai Li, lieutenant general and spymaster (d. 1946)
- June 1 — Yang Zhongjian, paleontologist and zoologist (d. 1979)
- June 7 — Tan Lark Sye, founder of the Nanyang University (d. 1972)
- July 23 — Tang Feifan, medical microbiologist (d. 1958)
- August 24 — Cheng Fangwu, politician (d. 1984)
- September 19 — Zhu Guangqian, esthetician, modern literary theorist and scholar (d. 1986)
- October 25 — Wu Yun An, surgeon and soldier (d. 1993)
- November 26 — Zhang Guotao, founding member of the Chinese Communist Party (d. 1979)
- December 21 — Luo Jialun, historian, diplomat and political activist (d. 1969)

=== Dates unknown ===
- He Zhuguo, general (d. 1985)

== Deaths ==
- July 31 — Li Hongzao, government official (b. 1820)
- Yang Changjun, 88th & 91st Viceroy of Shaan-Gan (b. 1825)
- Zhang Zhiwan, statesman and painter (b. 1811)
