= 1887 in China =

- Decades: 1860s; 1870s; 1880s; 1890s; 1900s
- See also: Other events of 1887; History of China • Timeline • Years

Events in the year 1887 in China.

== Incumbents ==
- Emperor: Guangxu Emperor (13th year)

=== Viceroys ===
- Viceroy of Zhili — Li Hongzhang
- Viceroy of Min-Zhe — Yang Changjun
- Viceroy of Huguang — Yulu
- Viceroy of Shaan-Gan — Tan Zhonglin
- Viceroy of Liangguang — Zhang Zhidong
- Viceroy of Yun-Gui — Cen Yuying
- Viceroy of Sichuan — Liu Bingzhang
- Viceroy of Liangjiang — Zeng Guoquan then Yulu then Zeng Guoquan

== Events ==
- 6 July - Establishment of the Vicariate Apostolic of Southern Shensi
- September- 1887 Yellow River flood- an estimated 1-2 million people die and up to another 2 million die in a pandemic in the following months
- 1 December - Sino-Portuguese Treaty of Peking
- Census finds a population of 401,520,392
