= 1890 in China =

- Decades: 1870s; 1880s; 1890s; 1900s; 1910s
- See also: Other events of 1890; History of China • Timeline • Years

Events from the year 1890 in China.

== Incumbents ==
- Guangxu Emperor (17th year)
  - Regent: Empress Dowager Cixi

== Events ==
- February 17 — The British steamship Duburg is wrecked in the South China Sea: 400 lives are lost
- December 27 — The British steamship Shanghai burns in the East China Sea off the coast of Anhui Province; 101 lives are lost.

== Births ==
- Taixu, Chinese Buddhist activist
- Lee Sun Chau
- Lü Ronghuan
- Wang Xugao
- Chen Yinke
- Chen Jitang
- Men Bingyue

== Deaths ==
- April 12 — Zeng Jize, diplomat (b. 1839)
- April 19 — Lai Afong, photographer (b. 1839)
- November 13 — Zeng Guoquan, official and military leader (b. 1824)
- December 11 — Pan Zuyin, high-ranking Mandarin and art collector (b. 1830)
- December 26 — Imperial Noble Consort Zhuangjing, consort of Emperor Xianfeng (b. 1837).
