= List of Chinese films of the 1980s =

This is a list of films produced in mainland China ordered by year of release in the 1980s. For an alphabetical listing of Chinese films see Category:Chinese films

== 1980 ==
| Title | Chinese Title | Director | Actors | Genre | Notability |
|---|---|---|---|---|---|
| Evening Rain | 巴山夜雨 | Wu Yonggang, Wu Yigong | | Drama | Co-winner of the first Golden Rooster for best picture in 1981 |
| Kith and Kin | 亲缘 | Teng Wenji; Wu Tianming | Li Weixin, Liu Dong | Drama | |
| Legend of Tianyun Mountain | 天云山传奇 | Xie Jin | | Drama | Co-winner of the first Golden Rooster for best picture in 1981 |
| Romance on Lushan Mountain | 庐山恋 | Huang Zumu | | Drama | |

== 1981 ==
| Title | Chinese Title | Director | Actors | Genre | Notability |
|---|---|---|---|---|---|
| Awakening | 苏醒 | Teng Wenji | Joan Chen, Xu Huanshan | Romance | Also known as 'Revival' |
| A Deer of Nine Colors | 九色鹿 | | | Animated short | Shanghai Animation Film Studio |
| Drive to Win | 沙鸥 | Zhang Nuanxin | | Drama | Title literally means 'sand gull' and is the name of the lead character |
| Longing for My Native Country | 乡情 | Hu Bingliu, Wang Jin | Huang Jinchang, Ren Yexiang | Drama | Entered into the 32nd Berlin International Film Festival |
| Neighbors | 邻居 | Zheng Dongtian, Xu Guming | | Drama | |
| Regret for the Past | 伤逝 | Shui Hua | Wang Xingang, Huang Zhongluo | Drama | |
| Ren Shen Guo | 人參果 | | | Animation | Shanghai Animation Film Studio |
| The True Story of Ah Q | 阿Q正传 | Fan Cen | Yan Shunkai | Drama | Entered into the 1982 Cannes Film Festival |

== 1982 ==
| Title | Chinese Title | Director | Actors | Genre | Notability |
|---|---|---|---|---|---|
| Countering Lights | 逆光 | Ding Yinnan | Guo Kaimin, Wu Yuhua | Romance | |
| The Deer's Bell | 鹿铃 | Wu Qiang, Tang Cheng | | Animated short | Winner of the third Golden Rooster for Best Animation in 1983. Shanghai Animation Film Studio |
| The Herdsman | 牧马人 | Xie Jin | Zhu Shimao, Liu Qiong | Drama | Screened at the 1983 Cannes Film Festival |
| My Memories of Old Beijing | 城南旧事 | Wu Yigong | Shen Jia, Zhang Fengyi, Zheng Zhenyao | Drama | Winner of the third Golden Rooster for Best Director, Best Music and Best Supporting Actress in 1983 |
| Red Elephant | 红象 | Tian Zhuangzhuang, Zhang Jianya, Xie Xiaojing | Yan Jiao, Zi Ge | Children/Family | |
| Rickshaw Boy | 骆驼祥子 | Ling Zifeng | Siqin Gaowa, Zhang Fengyi | Drama | Golden Rooster for Best Film in 1983 |
| Strange Friends | 陌生的朋友 | Lei Xu | Li Ling, Zhang Chao | | Entered into the 33rd Berlin International Film Festival |

== 1983 ==
| Title | Chinese Title | Director | Actors | Genre | Notability |
|---|---|---|---|---|---|
| The Candidate | 候补队员 | Wu Ziniu | Jiang Shuo, Liu Weiping | Drama | |
| One and Eight | 一个和八个 | Zhang Junzhao | Tao Zeru, Chen Daoming, Lu Xiaoyan | War | One of the first "Fifth Generation" films, cinematography by Zhang Yimou |
| River Without Buoys | 没有航标的河流 | Wu Tianming | Li Wei, Song Baosen, Tao Yuling | Drama | |
| Thunderstorm | 雷雨 | Sun Daolin | Sun Daolin, Gu Yongfei | Drama | Based on the play Thunderstorm |

== 1984 ==
| Title | Director | Actors | Genre | Notability |
|---|---|---|---|---|
| Blue Flowers | Shui Hua, Ma Bingyu | Guo Kaimin | Drama | |
| The Border Town | Ling Zifeng | Feng Hanyuan | Drama | Golden Rooster Award for Best Director |
| September | Tian Zhuangzhuang | | Drama | |
| Wreaths at the Foot of the Mountain | Xie Jin | | War | |
| Yellow Earth | Chen Kaige | Wang Xueqi | Drama | Chen Kaige's directorial debut |

== 1985 ==
| Title | Director | Actors | Genre | Notability |
|---|---|---|---|---|
| Army Nurse | Hu Mei, Li Xiaojun | | Romance | |
| The Black Cannon Incident | Huang Jianxin | | Black comedy | Screened at the 1987 Cannes Film Festival |
| Dove Tree | Wu Ziniu | | War | First Fifth Generation film to be banned |
| Liangjia funu | Huang Jianzhong | | Drama | |
Monkey King Conquers the Demon
| Mountain's Daughter | Chen Shengli | Ge You | Drama | |
| On the Hunting Ground | Tian Zhuangzhuang | | Drama | |
| Sacrifice of Youth | Zhang Nuanxin | Li Fengxu | Drama | |
| Stories of the Voyage | Liu Miaomiao | | Drama | |

== 1986 ==
| Title | Director | Actors | Genre | Notability |
|---|---|---|---|---|
| The Big Parade | Chen Kaige | Wang Xueqi | Drama | |
| Dislocation | Huang Jianxin | Liu Zifeng | Comedy/Science fiction | |
| A Girl from Hunan | Xie Fei | Naren Hua | Drama | Screened at the 1987 Cannes Film Festival |
| A Great Wall | Peter Wang | | | |
| Hibiscus Town | Xie Jin | Liu Xiaoqing, Jiang Wen | Drama | |
| The Horse Thief | Tian Zhuangzhuang | | Drama | Named by Martin Scorsese as his favorite film of the 1980s |
| The Last Day of Winter | Wu Ziniu | | | |
| Old Well | Wu Tianming | Zhang Yimou | Drama | |
| Trapped in a Frozen River | Zhang Jianya | | Drama/Thriller | Also known as Ice River |
| The Tribulations of an Old Master | Wu Yigong, Zhang Jianya | Rosalind Chao, Chen Peisi | Drama | |

== 1987 ==
| Title | Director | Actors | Genre | Notability |
|---|---|---|---|---|
| Death Visits the Living | Huang Jianzhong | | Drama | |
| Desperation | Zhou Xiaowen, Shi Chengfeng | | Thriller | Also known as The Last Frenzy |
| Far From War | Hu Mei | | | |
| In Their Prime | Zhou Xiaowen, Guo Fangfang | | Drama | |
| King of the Children | Chen Kaige | Chen Shaohua | Drama | Entered into the 1988 Cannes Film Festival |
| Red Sorghum | Zhang Yimou | Gong Li | Drama/War | Early Zhang Yimou effort, Golden Bear winner at Berlin |
| Street Players | Tian Zhuangzhuang | | Drama | Also known as Drum Singers |
| Sun Yatsen | Ding Yinnan | | Biographical | |
| Women on the Long March | Liu Miaomiao | | War | |

== 1988 ==
| Title | Director | Actors | Genre | Notability |
|---|---|---|---|---|
| Between Life and Death | Wu Ziniu | | Drama | |
| The Boxer | Liu Miaomiao | Liu Shangxian | Drama | |
| Evening Bell | Wu Ziniu | Chong Peipei, Tao Zeru, Ge Yaming | War | Silver Bear-Jury Grand Prix winner at the 39th Berlin International Film Festival |
| Feeling from Mountain and Water | Te Wei | | Animated short | |
| The Filmmakers | Ding Yinnan | Siqin Gaowa | Drama | |
| Joyous Heroes | Wu Ziniu | | Drama | |
| Kidnapping Karajan | Zhang Jianya | | Comedy | |
| King of Chess | Teng Wenji | | Drama | |
| Mutiny | He Qun | | War | |
| Obsession | Zhou Xiaowen | | Drama | Also known as The Price of Frenzy |
| Rock 'n' Roll Kids | Tian Zhuangzhuang | | Drama | Also known as Rock Kids |
| Samsara | Huang Jianxin | Jia Hongsheng | | |
| Savage Land | Ling Zifeng | Liu Xiaoqing | Drama | |
| The Troubleshooters | Mi Jiashan | Zhang Guoli, Ge You | Comedy | |
| We Are the World | He Ping | | Drama | |
| Widow Village | Wang Jin | Hao Jialing, Tao Zeru | Drama | Also known as The Village of Widows |
| A Woman For Two | Ling Zifeng | Liu Xiaoqing | Drama | |

== 1989 ==
| Title | Director | Actors | Genre | Notability |
|---|---|---|---|---|
| Ballad of the Yellow River | Teng Wenji | Ge You | Drama | |
| Codename Cougar | Zhang Yimou, Yang Fengliang | Gong Li, Ge You | Action/Thriller | |
| Kawashima Yoshiko | He Ping | | Biographical | |
| The Shining Arc | Zhang Junzhao | | | Entered into the 16th Moscow International Film Festival |
| Unforgettable Life | Tian Zhuangzhuang | | Drama | Also known as Special Operating Room and Illegal Lives |
| Westbound Convict Train | He Qun | | Action/Thriller | |

== Mainland Chinese film production totals ==
| Year | Total Films |
|---|---|
| 1980 | 83 |
| 1981 | 105 |
| 1982 | 114 |
| 1983 | 127 |
| 1984 | 143 |
| 1985 | 127 |
| 1986 | 125 |
| 1987 | 146 |
| 1988 | 158 |
| 1989 | 136 |

== See also ==
- Cinema of China
- Best 100 Chinese Motion Pictures as chosen by the 24th Hong Kong Film Awards
