= 1894 in China =

- Decades: 1870s; 1880s; 1890s; 1900s; 1910s
- See also: Other events of 1894; History of China • Timeline • Years

Events in the year 1894 in China.

== Incumbents ==
- Guangxu Emperor (20th year)

== Events ==
- July 25 - Battle of Pungdo
- July 28–29 - Battle of Seonghwan
- September 15 - Battle of Pyongyang
- September 17 - Battle of the Yalu River (1894)
- October 24 - Battle of Jiuliancheng
- November 21 - Battle of Lushunkou

== Births ==
- October 5 - Deng Zhongxia

== Deaths ==
- September 17 - Deng Shichang
