= 1889 in China =

- Decades: 1860s; 1870s; 1880s; 1890s; 1900s
- See also: Other events of 1889; History of China • Timeline • Years

Events from the year 1889 in China.

== Incumbents ==
- Guangxu Emperor (15th year)
  - Regent: Empress Dowager Cixi

=== Viceroys ===
- Viceroy of Zhili — Li Hongzhang
- Viceroy of Min-Zhe — Bian Baodi
- Viceroy of Huguang — Yulu then Zhang Zhidong
- Viceroy of Shaan-Gan — Yang Changjun
- Viceroy of Liangguang — Zhang Zhidong then Li Hanzhang
- Viceroy of Yun-Gui — Cen Yuying then Tan Junpei then Wang Wenshao
- Viceroy of Sichuan — Liu Bingzhang
- Viceroy of Liangjiang — Zeng Guoquan

== Events ==
- Consort Jin, probably received the Jadeite Cabbage as part of her dowry for her wedding to Emperor Guangxu.
