= 1892 in China =

- Decades: 1870s; 1880s; 1890s; 1900s; 1910s
- See also: Other events of 1892; History of China • Timeline • Years

Events from the year 1892 in China.

== Incumbents ==
- Guangxu Emperor (18th year)
  - Regent: Empress Dowager Cixi

== Events ==
China Complaint On U.S. Immigration Bill

== Births ==
- Chen Guofu (1892-1951), Tongmenghui member and ROC politician
- Wu Shuqing, feminist, nationalist and revolutionary
