= 1891 in China =

- Decades: 1870s; 1880s; 1890s; 1900s; 1910s
- See also: Other events of 1891; History of China • Timeline • Years

Events from the year 1891 in China.

== Incumbents ==
- Guangxu Emperor (18th year)
  - Regent: Empress Dowager Cixi

== Events ==
- Jindandao incident, a rebellion by a Chinese secret society called Jindandao (金丹道), who rose in revolt in Inner Mongolia in November 1891 and massacred 150,000 Mongols before being suppressed by government troops in late December.
- Anti-missionary riots in Wuhu, two Chinese nuns walking the streets, anointing the holy water on children, and onlookers began to harasses the nuns and took them to the police. The nuns were returned to the Roman Catholic mission. People were not satisfied and called for a riot against the Roman Catholic mission.

== Births ==
- Li Daichen
- Li Jieren
- Chen Wangdao
- Wang Shijie
- Wang Maozu

== Deaths ==
- Li Rongfa
- Guanwen
- Guo Songtao
