= Yunnan delegation to the National People's Congress =

Yunnan Delegation to the National People's Congress
- 全国人民代表大会云南省代表团
- Delegation for the National People's Congress
- Map showing the location of Yunnan Province
- Electoral unit: Yunnan Province
- Population: 47,209,277

Current Delegation
- Created: 1954
- Seats: 91
- Head of delegation: Wang Ning
- Provincial People's Congress: Yunnan Provincial People's Congress

The Yunnan delegation to the National People's Congress is a delegation composed of deputies representing Yunnan Province within the National People's Congress (NPC), the supreme organ of state power of the People's Republic of China. NPC deputies from the Yunnan Province are officially elected by the Yunnan Provincial People's Congress.

== List of deputies ==
Year	NPC sessions	Deputies	Number of deputies	Ref.
1954	1st	Dao Youliang, Dao Jingban, Wang Shaoyan, Zhao Cunxin, Bai Xiaosong, Zhu Jiabi, Yu Haiqing, Li Guanghua, Li Guangrong, Li Hecai, Li Neng, Li Guiying, Li Zhuo'an, Zhou Baozhong, He Wanbao, Song Mou, Hu Zhonghua, Xu Jiarui, Qin Renchang, Ma Jian, Gao Shiqi, Zhang Zizhai, Zhang Chong, Zhang Huiying, Mei Yi, Pu Zhao, Zeng Wenchang, Huang Luofeng, Chu Tunan, Dong Fusheng, Lei Chunguo, Xiong Kaiyou, Pei Aqian, Zhao Zhongqi, Liu Rongxian, Ou Gen, Pan Shuoduan, Zheng Dun, Lu Han, Long Mingchuan, Long Yun, Xie Fuzhi, Wei Yajing, Luo Yi, Gong Shou		
1959	2nd	Dao Jing, Yu Yichuan, Wang Shaoyan, Zhao Cunxin, Lu Han, Fu Yizhi, Liu Aluzi, Liu Chun, Liu Rongxian, Liu Shuqing (female), Song Renqiong, Han Fuyou, Geng Jue, Li Kairong, Li Guanghua, Li Zirong, Li Hecai, Li Guiying (female), Li Neng, Zhang Zizhai, Zhang Tianfang, Zhang Chong, Zhang Huiying (female), Zhang Linzhi, Luo Yuntong, Zhu Liangfu, He Fengzhao, Zhou Xing, Zhou Baozhong, Zhao Jiuzhang, Zhao Zhongqi, Hu Zhonghua, Gao Shiqi, Qin Renchang, Ma Jian, Ma Jikong, Xu Jiarui, Pu Guizhong, Zeng Wenchang, Lei Chunguo, Chu Tunan, Dong Fusheng, Xiong Kaiyou, Wei Yajing, Gong Shou		
1964	3rd	Dao Jing, Yu Yichuan, Ma Jian, Fang Guoyu, Fang Yong, Wang Shaoyan, Wang Ruchang, Mao Abei, Kong Zhiqing, Ai Siqi, Lu Han, Fu Yizhi, Zhao Cunxin, Liu Linyuan, Liu Minghui, Liu Chun, Liu Rongxian, Liu Shuqing, Liu Xiangping, Guan Suqian, Xing Fangqun, Zhu Yancheng, Ruan Jinmei, Han Fuyou, Li Wendong, Li Kairong, Li Zhake, Li Laohan, Li Guanghua, Li Qiao, Li Ziqiang, Li Ruju, Li Hecai, Li Runkai, Li Guiying, Li Neng, Li Xian, Yang Ayu, Yang Yiqing, Geng Jue, Xiao Zifu, Wu Zuomin, He Labiao, Zhang Zizhai, Zhang Tianfang, Zhang Kaicai, Zhang Maojun Zhang Chong, Zhang Huiying, Zhang Bihua, Lu Farong, Lin Yuanti, Yan Xiangkan, Luo Yuntong, Jin Guzhaida, Jin Yuelin, Zhu Liangfu, He Wenhua, He Shisheng, Nong Huilian, Meng Xianmin, Zhao Jiuzhang, Zhao Fengqi, Zhao Zhongqi, Hu Zhonghua, Mi Ge, Yao Zhenbai, Gao Shiqi, Qin Renchang, Yuan Shuipai, Yuan Suishan, Yuan Jitang, Yuan Huizhuo, Xu Jiarui, Yan Hongyan, Cao Benxi, Gong Shou, Pu Guizhong, Zeng Wenchang, Xie Fuzhi, Dong Fusheng, Han Zhong, Lei Guiyuan, Lei Chunguo, Bai An, Chu Tunan, Pei Aqian, Xiong Shizhen, Xiong Bingxin, Huo Zhikun, Mu Guangrong, Dai Yuan, Wei Yajing		
1975	4th	Seven Lord Duji, Wang Yunxian, Wang Shaoyan, Wang Jixiang, Wang Yangang, Wang Huixian, Fang Xiangdong, Fang Guoyu, Yin Jiaxian, Gan Zaiming, Gan Dengju, Shen Wenzhong, Si Lashan, Zhao Cunxin, Wei Mazha, Zhu Wenzao, Zhu Kejia, Zhu Dexiang, Liu Hongying, Liu Minghui, An Huiqin, Sun Guangdao, Li Zhaye, Li Shirong, Li Zhuying, Li Kezhong, Li Hecai, Yang Xinge, Yang Zhengxiang, Yang Shaohua, Yang Shunxian, Yang Chaoyou, Zou Yanqing Zhang Tianfang, Zhang Yuantian, Zhang Yunsheng, Zhang Chong, Zhang Liangcai, Lu Chaohai, Chen Yueduan, Chen Wencai, Chen Jie, Chen Pilu, Chen Ke, Fan Kaiyou, Fan Yuquan, Yan Shuai, Yan Xiangkan, Luo Guiyou, He Huijun, Jin Bao, Jin Guixian, Zhou Xing, Zhao Tingguang, Bao Hongzhong, Shi Chongyou, Qian Shurong, Yin Congxin, Guo Pianchu, Huang Zhaoqi, Liang Jianguo, Si Shuying, Dong Xuenong, Pu Ganyi, Pu Kaixiang, Ruiban, Lei Muhen, Cai Dashuang		
1978	5th	Yu Ren, Yu Lanfu, Cun Shida, Ma Erjin, Ma Qipei, Ma Yixian, Wang Shaoyan, Wang Zhongxiang, Wang Yangang, Mu Guixiang, Fang Guoyu, Yin Zichang, Kong Lihua, Kong Ruirong, Deng Xiuzhen, Shi Guang, Shi Yingcang, Shi Lin, Si Lashan, Zhao Cunxin, Baideng Duma, Bi Xueguang, Zhu Youming, Zhu Dexiang, Liu Qiying, Guan Sushuang, An Pingsheng, An Huiqin, Qi Shan, Sun Jiatai, Su Yanqing, Du Lubo, Li Zaihong, Li Shapu, Li Hecai, Li Rongmeng, Li Shengfeng, Li Nati, Li Xutai, Li Fuzhong, Yang Shuhuan Xiao Lizhen, Wu Xingshi, Wu Yinghuai, Wu Zhengyi, Zhang Tianfang, Zhang Yuantian, Zhang Yunsheng, Zhang Chong, Zhang Qiongzhi, Zhang Huiying, Zhang Dehua, Chen Ziyin, Chen Pilu, Lin Yuanti, Lin Yunsheng, Yan Yang, Luo Chaoqing, Jin Xuewen, Zhao Tingguang, Zhao Zengyi, Hu Erqian, Hu Rongxian, Mi Yuwang, Duan Huamin, Bao Xiaocong, Bao Hongzhong, Rao Xuecai, Qin Xueying, Yuan Jitang, Guo Zilong, Guo Shouli, Huang Tianyou, Huang Suzhen, Cao Ziqin, Pu Shangyi, Ruiban, Chu Tunan, Cai Qiongfen, Tan Qinglin, Pan Xunying, Huo Chun		
1983	6th	Ba Huayi, Dao Anju, Dao Guodong, Yu Lanfu, Ma Yuncong, Wang Yiming, Wang Zhihua, Wang Shaoyan, Wang Yangang, Wang Xueren, Yin Lifan, Deng Bacai, Lu Yongxiang, Bai Lazhe, Zhao Cunxin, Zhu Youming, Zhu Weijie, Zhu Dexiang, Liu Xingheng, Liu Zhizhong, Liu Zhuofu, Liu Minghui, Liu Shisong, Liu Deli, Guan Sushuang, Sun Yuting, Li Guanghua, Li Quankai, Li Guoliang, Li Hecai, Li Rongmeng, Li Guiying, Li Zhengyou, Li Zhangmei, Li Yuxian, Li Fuzhong, Yang Yuying, Yang Zhanchun, Yang Chuanjiang, Yang Shaohong, Yang Weijun, Yang Dezhen, Wu Zhengyi Wu Jinzhuang, He Bo, Yu Jiangfa, Zhang Zizhai, Zhang Tianfang, Zhang Guowei, Zhang Wei, Na Guoxiang, Lin Yuanti, Lin Houmo, Lin Defang, Ming Wencai, Yan Kanzhang, Yan Miao, Chuan Benzhen, Nong Yumei, Jin Guwujin, Jin Guilan, Jin Degui, Zheng Boke, Zhao Yinshan, Zhao Shuping, Hu Dehua, Zhong Zhenchuan, Bao Hongzhong, Guo Lizhen, Tang Jiashou, Tao Fachang, Huang Zibin, Huang Suzhen, Huang Guifang, Yin Emming, Pan Meifang, Jiang Xiaochun, Pu Shangyi, Pu Chaozhu, Pu Zhao, Zeng Shilin, Chu Tunan, Tan Kaiyao, Tan Qinglin, Xiong Shizhen, Miao Yijin, Huo Chun		
1988	7th	Dao Anju, Dao Shuren, Yu Lanfu, Ma Kaixian, Ma Yuncong, Wang Zhengguang, Wang Zhengfang, Wang Rencai, Wang Xueren, Wang Zhaoming, Ba Guoxin, Ai Qun, Zhao Cunxin, Yana, Zhu Dexiang, Liu Zhengrong, Liu Zhizhong, Guan Sushuang, Tang Guoyan, An Defu, Qi Shan, Ruan Qianfang, Sun Nuojicai, Sun Minchu, Li Wenxuan, Li Xiangmei, Li Guoxing, Li Peng, Li Yinsheng, Li Meiguang, Li Jiwu, Li Guiying, Yang Kaili, Yang Lanzhen, Yang Ming, Yang Shaohong, Yang Shunqun, Yang Zhen, Wu Zhengyi, Wu Jinzhuang, He Gui, He Haiqing, He Chaoyun, Yu Ju Xian, Gu Linxiang, Song Renqiong, Song Chengshu, Zhang Guowei, Zhang Rong, Zhang Rongchang, Zhang Yuji, Zhang Maosong, Asudaling, Qing Changgeng, Yu Wen, Yan Kanzhang, Yan Miao, He Zhiqiang, Jin De, Zhou Lin, Zong Yongzhuoma, Zhao Jiapei, Nan Tianwen, Zhong Zhenchuan, Duan Fakui, Duan Yuhua, Bao Hongzhong, Nie Ronggui, Xu Daoqian, Guo Shunying, Tao Fachang, Huang Tingzhong, Huang Guifang, Cao Xinquan, Pan Meifang, Peng Zhifen, Jiang Labai, Cheng Daolin, Pu Lianhe, Pu Zhao, Zeng Shilin, Zeng Yanqing, Chu Zhuang, Cai Liren, Cai Liuyan, Miao Yijin, Xue Wenxi		
1993	8th	Dao Youxiang, Dao Daokong, Dao Shuren, Dao Aimin, Ma Kaixian, Wang Zhengguang, Wang Hanbin, Wang Yongdian, Wang Tingchen, Wang Xueren, Wang Zhaoming, Yi He, Mu Rongxiang, Yin Jun, Deng Guoqiang, Lu Encai, Bai Qiaoying, Si Jiuyi, Lü Guanguo, Liu Zhonghui, Liu Shu, Liu Jing, Qi Jianren, Su Zhengguo, Li Hanbai, Li Guangming, Li Xianyou, Li Xiufang, Li Kunyang, Li Baolian, Li Rongchang, Li Yinsheng, Li Zhenguo, Li Guiying, Li Bin, Li Huifang, Li Conghui, Yang Chuanjiang, Yang Ming, Yang Jianqiang, Yang Zheng, Yang Bi Liang, Yang Fu, Xiao Daifen, Qiu Sanyi, Yu Zhiying, Zhang Rong, Zhang Meiqiong, Zhang Aoluo, Adou, Chen Pengnian, Qing Changgeng, Yan La, Yan Wen, Luo Weixin, Luo Zhengfu, Luo Linguo, He Shuangxiu, He Zhiqiang, He Limei, Jingu Adu, Zhou Lin, Zheng Zhigang, Zongyong Zhuoma, Zhao Dongfen, Zhao Shumin, Bao Yongkang, Xi Chengwen, He Gong, Gesang Dunzhu, Guo Junqing, Mei Duowen, Cheng Zhengning, Tong Lizhen, Pu Facui, Pu Zhiying, Pu Lianhe, Pu Chaozhu, Zeng Yongde, Chu Zhuang, Miao Yijin, Teng Teng, Pan Zhengyang		
1998	9th	Ma Zhongren (Dulong), Wang Tianxi (Yi), Wang Shikun, Wang Yongkui (Zhuang), Wang Zhidong, Wang Minglong, Wang Jiamin (Miao), Wang Xueren, Wang Xuezhi, Yin Jun ( Bai), Long Lan (Yi ), Lu Yunwu, Lu Bangzheng ( Yi), Lu Changtai (Zhuang), Bai Chengliang (Hani), Linghu An, Feng Jiacong, Bi Hong (Yi), Qu Liang (Lisu), Qu Lu (Nu), Zhu Zhiqiang, Zhu Weihua, Jiang Pu Li Weimin (Hani), Li Yuxue, Li Xiangyang (Tibetan), Li Ruzhong (Lahu), Li Hongmin (Yi), Li Malin, Li Xianwu (Bai), Li Baolian (De'ang), Li Zhenlian (Yao), Li Yingde (Bai), Li Hongfu (Hui), Li Yong (Hani), Li Tieying, Li Haiying (Yi), Li Weilin, Li Yuguang, Li Jiating (Yi), Yang Kaiming, Yang Xingfa (Yi), Yang Yingnan, Yang Jianjia, Yang Chonglong, Yang Chongyong (Manchu), Yang Xujia, Yang Fusheng (Hani), Wu Jialiang, Qiu Sanyi (Lisu), Yu Ji'an, Shen Anbo, Zhang Chengyin, Zhang Baosan, Zhang Yinlin, Zhang Meiqiong (Jino), Zhang Peiguang, Zhang Miao, Chen Jiahui, Lin Wenlan, Lin Yunmin, Yan Zhuang (Dai), Luo Zhengfu (Yi), Luo Zhize (Dai), Luo Huian, He Duanqi (Naxi), He Runcai (Pumi), Zheng Peng (Dai), Pang Xijun, Zheng Chengsi, Zheng Chunmin, Zongyong Zhuoma (Tibetan), Zhao Renquan (Bai), Zhao Yu, Duan Xingxiang, Feng Honglian (Blang), Ni Guangzu, Cao Yunzhong, Peng Zengmei (Yi), Suo Fei (Hui), Pu Yunshan (Yi), Pu Chaozhu, Lei Fengqing (Jingpo), Lei Wengtuan (Achang), Teng Erzhao (Dai), Guan Guofang (Dai), Xiong Jinqiong (Miao), Teng Teng, Wei Xuexian (Wa)		
2003	10th	Dao Meilan (female, Dai ), Ma Zixiao ( Hui ), Ma Ziying (female, Miao ), Wang Zhaoguo, Wang Li (female, Hani ), Wang Xueren, Wang Chengcai ( Zhuang ), Wang Chunzheng, Wang Yongde ( Nu ), Wang Ying (female, Bai ), Niu Shaoyao, Deng Xianpei, Yu Shuaijiao (female, Bulang ), Long Jiang, Lu Bangzheng ( Yi ), Lu Yanfen ( female, Hani), Fu Jun, Bai Chengliang (Hani), Bai Baoxing (Yi), Bai Enpei, Mao Wenguo, Liu Shaozhong, Qi Zhala ( Tibetan ), Jiang Pusheng, Sun Xueming, Li Zhuang, Li Xingwang ( Lahu ), Li Hongwei (Yi), Li Hongyun (female, Dai), Li Malin (female), Li Yingke (Yi), Li Hong (Yi), Li Zhuojuan (female, Yi), Li Jinwang ( Yao ), Li Chunlin, Li Baoshang (Hui), Li Haibo (Yi) Li Pei, Li Jin (female), Yang Guangcheng (Bai), Yang Chongyong ( Manchu ), Wu Lihua (female), Wu Yan (female), He Tianchun, Sha Wanxiang (Yi ), Shen Anbo, Song Jialin (Miao ), Zhang Shuichang, Zhang Meilan (female, Hani), Zhang Peiguang, Chen Qingyao, Chen Jiyan ( female ), Chen Zhi, Zhe Peixian ( female, Yi), Lin Wenlan, Ou Zhiming ( Lisu ), Yan Zhuang (Dai), Tudaoduoji (Tibetan), He Zixing ( Naxi ), He Duanqi (Naxi), He Jichun (female, Pumi ), Zhou Zhekun, Ye Libin (Yi), Zheng Jiandong, Zhao Shijie, Zhao Lixiong (Bai), Zhao Jingwei, Hu Kangsheng, Duan Xingxiang, Hong Bin ( Wa), Qin Guangrong, Yuan Si, Gesang Dunzhu (Tibetan), Xu Rongkai, Gao Hong (Bai), Gao Zuxing (Zhuang), Gao Feng, Gao Derong ( Dulong )Tang Shihua (Lisu), Cao Mingqiang ( Achang ), Cao Jianfang, Cao Mengliang ( Jino ), Gong Jingzheng (Dai), Ma Duan ( Jingpo ), Zhang Zhenguo, Suo Fei (Hui), Zeng Liyan, Lai Yongliang ( De'ang ), Guan Guofang (female, Dai), Xiong Qinghua, Pan Huayan (female, Yi)		
2008	11th	Ding Xiuhua (female, Nu ethnic group), Dao Linyin (female, Dai ethnic group), Ma Zhengshan (Dulong ethnic group), Ma Jilin (Hui ethnic group), Ma Ziying (female, Miao ethnic group), Wang Tianhai, Wang Junzheng, Wang Mingquan, Wang Minghui, Wang Chengcai (Zhuang ethnic group), Wang Shufen (female, Tibetan ethnic group), Wang Hong (female, Yi ethnic group), Wang Hailiang, Wang Minzheng, Wang Ying ( female, Bai ethnic group), Wang Fumin (Hui ethnic group), Niu Shaoyao, Deng Yonghe (Yao ethnic group), Shi Chunyun (Lahu ethnic group), Long Jiang, Bai Fengzhi (female, Hani ethnic group), Bai Baoxing (Yi), Bai Enpei, Bao Bulu (Jino), Lü Yanling (female), Zhu Shaoming, Liu Shaozhong, Mi Dongsheng, Jiangbajicai (Tibetan), Xu Zhiqin (female), Xu Qianfei, Sun Chunlan (female, Achang), Li Yunlong (Yi), Li Zhengyang, Li Jiheng, Li Shuxian (female, Yi), Li Peishan, Li Fuzhen (female, Hani), Li Jin (female), Yang Xiaoping, Yang Yamei (female, Yi), Yang Guangcheng (Bai), Yang Guangyin (Yi), Yang Hongwei (Yi), Yang Jin Song (female, Naxi), Yang Ming, Yang Yan (female, De'ang), Yang Fusheng ( Hani ), He Jinping (Bai), He Jianwen (Bai), He Yong, Yu Mayue (Jingpo ), Zou Ping (female, Yi), Shen Peiping, Song Xiude, Zhang Xiulan (female, Miao), Zhang Meilan (female, Hani), Zhang Zulin, Zhang Weijian, Chen Jianguo (Tibetan), Chen Qiusheng, Chen Jiyan (female), Yan San (Blang), Luo Zhengfu (Yi), Luo Bihui (female), Luo Chongmin, He Ji Chun (female, Pumi), Yue Yuesheng, Meng Biguang (Dai), Meng Sutie, Zhao Gang (Yi), Zhao Jian (female, Dai), Cha Zhongwang (Yi), Hu Kangsheng, Duan Xingxiang, Hou Xinhua (Lisu), Qin Guangrong, Yuan Si, Yan Youqiong (female), Feng Liqiu (female, Dai), Xu Xiangdong (Wa), Xu Rongkai, Gao Jinsong, Gao Hong (Bai), Tang Shihua (Lisu), Huang Wenwu (Zhuang), Shang Xiaoyun, Dong Hua, Zeng Liyan, Guan Guofang (female, Dai), Liao Zelong		
2013	12th	Cun Maohong, Cun Min (female, Bai ethnicity), Wang Changyong, Wang Tianhai, Wang Minghui, Wang Shufen (female, Tibetan ethnicity), Wang Xiliang, ~~Qiu He~~, ~~Fang Wenxin (Dai ethnicity)~~, Fang Lianying (female, Yi ethnicity), ~~Kong Chuizhu~~, Deng Qiandui (Nu ethnicity), Deng Rui (female, Yao ethnicity), Bai Baoxing (Yi ethnicity), Bai ~~Enpei~~, Ta Shenghua, Zhu Shaoming, Ren Jianzheng, Zi Guiju (female, Yi ethnicity), Liu Baisheng, Jiang Nong (female, Hani ethnicity), Xu Hong (female), Xu Hai, Ruan Yongchuan, Li Wenrong, Li Siming (Lisu ethnicity), Li Guangcheng (Miao ethnicity), Li Guanghui (female), Li Jiang (female), Li Hongmin (female, Yi ethnicity) Li Hongmei (female, Bai ethnicity), Li Jiheng, Li Songquan (Lahu ethnicity), Li Xuelin, Li Ye ( Hani ethnicity), Yang Fuwang (Yi ethnicity), Yang Jinsong (female, Naxi ethnicity), Yang Ming, Yang Zongliang (Zhuang ethnicity), Yang Yan (female, De'ang ethnicity), Yang Qiong ( female, Miao ethnicity), Yang Jing (Mongolian ethnicity), Yang Fusheng (Hani ethnicity), Wu Song, He Hua (Bai ethnicity), He Jinping (Bai ethnicity), Yu Xiuzhi (female, Lisu ethnicity), Yu Mayue (Jingpo ethnicity) Song Wanyong, Zhang Zhengwu, Zhang Jihua, Zhang Xuequn, Zhang Guizhong (Hani), Zhang Guibai, Chen Wenqin (female, Yi), Chen Kehan (female, Hui), Chen Ailin, Wu Dongli, Fan Huaping, Luo Hongjiang (Dai ), Luo Jinling (female, Yi), He Lianghui (Naxi), Yue Yuesheng, Zhou Zhenhai, Ye Libin ( Yi), Zheng Yuxin, Shan Lianghong (Yi), Zhao Yunzhu (Yi), Zhao Lixiong (Bai), Zhao Jian (female, Dai, Hu A'luo (female, Yi), Duan Xiuying (female, Dulong), Rao Nanhu (female), Qin Guangrong, Qin Liyun (female, Dai), Yuan Si, Yan Youqiong (female), Qian Dewei, Tie Feiyan (female, Hui), Ni Yuehong, Gao Yan (female, Yi), Zi Yanping (female, Jino), Huang Wenwu (Zhuang), Huang Zhenghong (Tibetan), Cao Hongmei (female, Achang), Gong Jingzheng (Dai), Dong Hua, ~~Suo Fei (Hui)~~, Bao Hongyi (female, Wa), Sai Meng (Blang)Xiong Yuande (Pumi ethnic group)		
2018	13th	Dao Xiaoqin (female, Dai), Wei Gang (Dai), Ma Zhengshan (Dulong), Wang Changlin (female, Hani), Wang Shufen (female, Tibetan), Wang Yanmeng (female, Dai), Wang Gengjie,~~Wang Xiliang~~,~~Cheye~~(Hani ethnic group), ~~Deng Jinxiu~~ (Yao ethnic group), Yulong (female, Bulang ethnic group), Zhu Youyong, Zhu Zhaoyun (female), Qi Jianxin (Tibetan ethnic group), Xu Hong (female)~~Xu Lei~~Nong Ning'an (Zhuang), Ruan Chengfa, Du Xiaoguang (Bai), Li Wenhui (Lisu), Li Ning, Li Xiaoxuan, Li Xiumei (female, Lahu), Li Xiuling, Li Guowei, Li Jinlian (female, Lisu), Li Shuxian (female, Yi), Li Mei (female, Yi), Li Biao,~~Yang Xiaoping~~Yang Jun, Yang Jie, Yang Hongbo (Bai ethnicity), Yang Lianying (female, Miao ethnicity), Yang Xiaoxue (female, Bai ethnicity ), Yang Jian ( Bai ethnicity), Yang Bin (Yi ethnicity), Yang Zhaohui, Qiu Jiang (Gelao ethnicity), Yu Xiaoqin (female, Nu ethnicity), Zhang Zhizheng (Yi ethnicity), Zhang Shougang, Zhang ~~Xiulan~~ (female, Miao ethnicity), Zhang Yansong, Zhang Li (female, Hani ethnicity), Zhang Yijun (Achang ethnicity), Zhang Hui (female), Zhang Dehua, Lu Yongyao (Zhuang ethnicity), Lu Junhua, Chen Weidong, Chen Wen Qin (female, Yi), Chen Kehan (female, Hui), Chen Hao, Wu Yi, Lama Xinggao (Yi), Fan Yongzhen (female, Naxi), Lin Wenxun, Luo Hongjiang (Dai), Luo Aying (female, Jino), Luo Jun (female, Yi), Luo Ping (female, Hani), He Duanqi (Naxi), Zheng Yi, Zong Guoying, Xian Xiaoyun (female, De'ang), Zhao Yunzhu (Yi), Zhao Yongping, Hu A'luo (female, Yi), Hu Shengbao (Pumi).~~Duan Wenquan~~Hou Jianjun, Jiang Jianping (female, Dai), Yuan Si, Yuan Haibo, Gao Daoquan, Guo Dajin, Guo Jin (Yi), Guo Shengkun, Tao Chun (Yi), Cao Qinghua (Hani), Dong Baotong, Jiang Lihong (female, Yi), Han Mei (female, Miao), Fan Yueping (Jingpo), Zhen Lanfang (female, Hui), Lei Guangfeng, Dou Zhengbao, Tan Decai,~~Dai Shihong~~Wei Jinlong (Wa ethnic group)		
2023	14th	Wan Li, Wei Gang, Ma Jian, Ma Zhongjun, Wang Ning, Wang Gang, Wang Hua, Wang Changlin, Wang Yubo, Wang Guanghui, Wang Lufen, Wang Chunyuan, Wang Jialing, Kong Lingyong, Bamo Qubumo, Yu Long, Shi Yugang, Long Shan, Fu Jiao, Bai Yongkang, Feng Zhili, Lan Lan, Liu Wei, Liu Fei, Jiang Hua, Xu Bo, Nong Jiagui, Su Yongzhong, Su Jiaen, Du Xiaoguang, Du Jianhui, Li Gang, Li Ling, Li Yong, Li Qiang, Li Xiaosan, Li Kaida, Li Wenhui, Li Zhenghuan, Li Xianxiang, Li Zhijuan, Li Qinglin, Li Guowei, Li Ruifang, Yang Xiaohua, Yang Chang Kai, Yang Chengxin, Yang Chunlan, Yang Lianying, Yang Yaqin, Qiu Jiang, He Yanping, Yu Feixia, Wang Xia, Zhang Hui, Zhang Weidong, Zhang Zijian, Zhang Taiyuan, Zhang Wenwang, Zhang Shiying, Zhang Keqin, Zhang Yingjie, Chen Yangang, Chen Zujun, Chen Zhenyong, Yu Wulin, Luo Ping, Yue Xiuhu, Jin Ruirui, Rongba Xina, Hu Jun, Hong Weizhi, Xu Yushan, Xu Ance, Gao Wei, Guo Jin, Guo Zhengyao, Huang Chunqiu, Pan Jian, Liang Zhaogang, Jiang Yunzhong, Han Mei, Lu Quan, Lu Lihua, Pu Changwen, Zhen Lanfang, Man Youneng, Xiong Wenlan, Pan Benfang	91	
