= Governor of Yunnan =

Governor of the Yunnan Provincial People's Government
- 云南省人民政府省长
- National Emblem of China

- Flag of China
- Incumbent; Liu Qifan; Acting since 2 November 2026
- Yunnan Provincial People's Government
- Type: Governor
- Status: Provincial and ministerial-level official
- Reports to: Yunnan Provincial People's Congress and its Standing Committee
- Nominator: Presidium of the Yunnan Provincial People's Congress
- Appointer: Yunnan Provincial People's Congress
- Inaugural holder: Lu Han
- Formation: 9 December 1949
- Deputy: Deputy Governors; Secretary-General

The governor of Yunnan, officially the Governor of the Yunnan Provincial People's Government, is the head of Yunnan Province and leader of the Yunnan Provincial People's Government.

The governor is elected by the Yunnan Provincial People's Congress, and responsible to it and its Standing Committee. The governor is a provincial level official and is responsible for the overall decision-making of the provincial government. The governor is assisted by an executive vice governor as well as several vice governors. The governor generally serves as the deputy secretary of the Yunnan Provincial Committee of the Chinese Communist Party and as a member of the CCP Central Committee. The governor is the second highest-ranking official in the province after the secretary of the CCP Yunnan Committee. The current acting governor is Liu Qifan, who took office on 2 November 2026.

== List of governors ==
=== Republic of China ===
Kuomintang (Nationalist)

No.	Portrait	Name (Birth–Death)	Term of office		Political party
1		Long Yun 龍雲 Lóng Yún (1884–1962)	17 January 1928	2 October 1945	Kuomintang Yunnan clique
1		Long Yun 龍雲 Lóng Yún (1884–1962)	Of Yi descent. Removed from office.		
—		Li Zonghuang 李宗黄 Lǐ Zōnghuáng (1888–1978)	2 October 1945	1 December 1945	Kuomintang
2		Lu Han 盧漢 Lú Hàn (1896–1974)	1 December 1945	9 December 1949	Kuomintang
2		Lu Han 盧漢 Lú Hàn (1896–1974)	Of Yi descent. Defected to the Communists.		
3		Li Mi 李彌 Lǐ Mí (1902–1973)	21 December 1945	1954	Kuomintang
3		Li Mi 李彌 Lǐ Mí (1902–1973)	Post abolished.		

=== People's Republic of China ===
Portrait	Name (English)	Name (Chinese)	Tenure begins	Tenure ends	Ref.
	Lu Han	卢汉	9 December 1949	January 1950	
	Chen Geng	陈赓	January 1950	April 1955	
	Guo Yingqiu	郭影秋	January 1955	March 1958	
	Yu Yichuan	于一川	March 1958	August 1964	
	Liu Minghui	刘明辉	August 1964	18 February 1965	
	Zhou Xing	周兴	18 February 1965	31 March 1967	
	Li Chengfang	李成芳	31 March 1967	10 August 1968	
	Tan Furen	谭甫仁	10 August 1968	17 December 1970	
	Zhou Xing	周兴	December 1970	3 October 1975	
	Jia Qiyun	贾启允	5 October 1975	2 February 1977	
	An Pingsheng	安平生	2 February 1977	31 December 1979	
	Liu Minghui	刘明辉	31 December 1979	25 March 1983	
	Pu Chaozhu	普朝柱	29 April 1983	16 August 1985	
	He Zhiqiang	和志强	16 August 1985	18 January 1998	
	Li Jiating	李嘉廷	18 January 1998	1 June 2001	
	Xu Rongkai	徐荣凯	1 June 2001	6 November 2006	
	Qin Guangrong	秦光荣	6 November 2006	30 August 2011	
	Li Jiheng	李纪恒	30 August 2011	17 October 2014	
	Chen Hao	陈豪	17 October 2014	13 December 2016	
	Ruan Chengfa	阮成发	13 December 2016	25 November 2020	
	Wang Yubo	王予波	25 November 2020	2 November 2026	
	Liu Qifan	刘奇凡	2 November 2026	Incumbent	
