= Yunnan Provincial People's Government =

Yunnan Provincial People's Government 云南省人民政府
- Established: December 1949; 76 years ago

Leadership
- Governor: Liu Qifan since 2 November 2026
- Parent body: Central People's Government; Yunnan Provincial People's Congress
- Elected by: Yunnan Provincial People's Congress

Meeting place
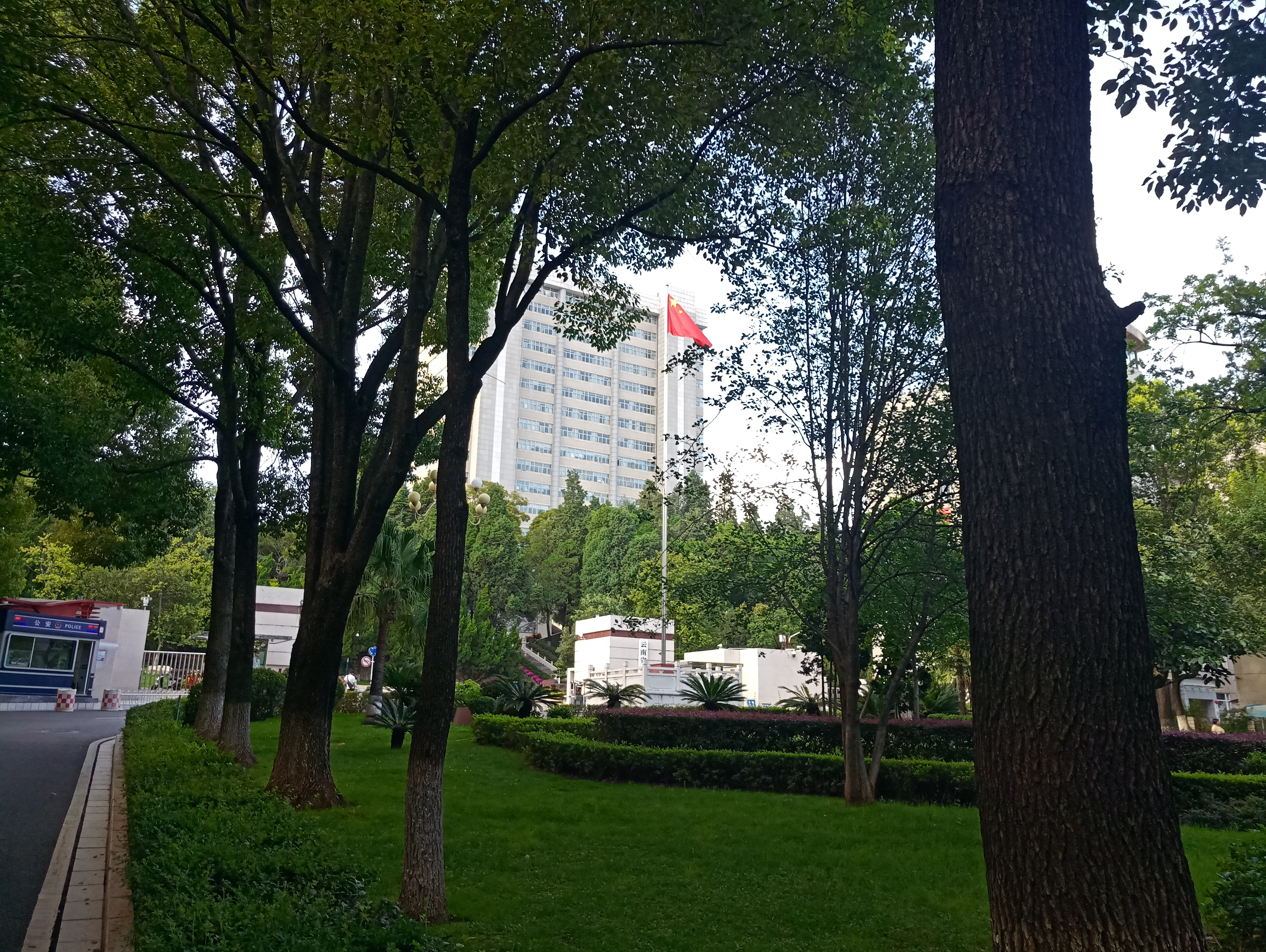
- Headquarters

Website
- www.yn.gov.cn

Yunnan Provincial People's Government
- Simplified Chinese: 云南省人民政府
- Traditional Chinese: 雲南省人民政府
Transcriptions
Standard Mandarin
- Hanyu Pinyin: Yúnnánshěng Rénmín Zhèngfǔ

The Yunnan Provincial People's Government (Chinese: 云南省人民政府) is the local administrative agency of Yunnan. It is officially elected by the Yunnan Provincial People's Congress and is formally responsible to the Yunnan Provincial People's Congress and its Standing Committee. Under the country's one-party system, the governor is subordinate to the secretary of the Yunnan Provincial Committee of the Chinese Communist Party. The Provincial government is headed by a governor, currently Wang Yubo.

== History ==
The Yunnan Provincial People's Government traces its origins to the Yunnan Provincial Military and Political Commission, founded in December 1949. Its name was changed to Yunnan Provincial People's Committee (云南省人民委员会) in April 1955 and subsequently Yunnan Provincial Revolutionary Committee (云南省革命委员会) in August 1968 during the Cultural Revolution. It reverted to its former name of Guizhou Provincial People's Government in December 1979.

== Organization ==
The organization of the Yunnan Provincial People's Government includes:

- General Office of the Yunnan Provincial People's Government

=== Component Departments ===
- Yunnan Provincial Development and Reform Commission
- Yunnan Provincial Education Department
- Yunnan Provincial Science and Technology Department
- Yunnan Provincial Industry and Information Technology Department
- Yunnan Provincial Ethnic and Religious Affairs Commission
- Yunnan Provincial Public Security Department
- Yunnan Provincial Civil Affairs Department
- Yunnan Provincial Justice Department
- Yunnan Provincial Finance Department
- Yunnan Provincial Human Resources and Social Security Department
- Yunnan Provincial Natural Resources Department
- Yunnan Provincial Ecology and Environment Department
- Yunnan Provincial Housing and Urban Rural Development Department
- Yunnan Provincial Transportation Department
- Yunnan Provincial Water Resources Department
- Yunnan Provincial Agriculture and Rural Affairs Department
- Yunnan Provincial Commerce Department
- Yunnan Provincial Culture and Tourism Department
- Yunnan Provincial Health Commission
- Yunnan Provincial Veterans Affairs Department
- Yunnan Provincial Emergency Management Department
- Yunnan Provincial Audit Office
- Foreign Affairs Office of Yunnan Provincial People's Government

=== Directly affiliated special institution ===
- State-owned Assets Supervision and Administration Commission of Yunnan Provincial People's Government

=== Organizations under the government ===
- Research Office of Yunnan Provincial People's Government
- Yunnan Provincial Administration for Market Regulation
- Yunnan Provincial Radio and Television Bureau
- Yunnan Provincial Energy Bureau
- Yunnan Provincial Forestry and Grassland Bureau
- Yunnan Provincial Sports Bureau
- Yunnan Provincial Statistics Bureau
- Yunnan Rural Revitalization Bureau
- Yunnan Provincial Local Financial Supervision and Administration Bureau
- Yunnan Provincial Bureau of Letters and Visits
- Yunnan Provincial Office Affairs Management Bureau
- Yunnan Province Central Yunnan Water Diversion Project Construction Management Bureau
- Yunnan Provincial People's Air Defense Office
- Yunnan Provincial Medical Security Bureau

=== Departmental management organization ===
Yunnan Provincial Grain and Material Reserve Bureau Yunnan Provincial Prison Administration Bureau Yunnan Provincial Drug Rehabilitation Administration Yunnan Provincial Drug Administration

=== Public institutions ===
- Yunnan Provincial People's Government Development Research Center
- Yunnan Provincial Investment Promotion Bureau
- Yunnan Academy of Social Sciences
- Yunnan Academy of Agricultural Sciences
- Yunnan Provincial Institute of Culture and History
- Yunnan Provincial People's Government Beijing Office
- Yunnan Provincial People's Government Shanghai Office
- Yunnan Provincial Geological and Mineral Exploration and Development Bureau
- Yunnan Provincial Nonferrous Geological Bureau
- Yunnan Provincial Agricultural Reclamation Bureau
- Yunnan Television
- Yunnan Provincial Federation of Supply and Marketing Cooperatives
- Yunnan Branch of China Council for the Promotion of International Trade

=== Agency ===
- Yunnan Dianzhong New Area
