= Li Jiating =

Chinese politician

- 李嘉廷

Governor of Yunnan
- In office January 1998 – June 2001
- Party Secretary: Linghu An
- Preceded by: He Zhiqiang
- Succeeded by: Xu Rongkai

Mayor of Harbin
- In office February 1991 – October 1992
- Party Secretary: Li Genshen; Tian Fengshan
- Preceded by: Zhang Delin
- Succeeded by: Suo Changyou

Personal details
- Born: April 1944 (age 82) Shiping County, Yunnan, China
- Party: Chinese Communist Party (1964–2001; expelled)
- Spouse: Wang Xiao
- Children: 2 sons
- Education: Tsinghua University

Li Jiating (Chinese: 李嘉廷; pinyin: Lǐ Jiātíng; born 1944) is an ethnic Yi People's Republic of China politician.

He was an alternate member of the 14th Central Committee of the Chinese Communist Party (1992–1997) and 15th Central Committee of the Chinese Communist Party (1997–2002). He was a delegate to the 9th National People's Congress (1998–2003).

== Biography ==
He was born in Shiping County, Yunnan, in April 1944. He was a graduate of Tsinghua University.

He was mayor of Harbin, Heilongjiang and governor of his home province.

== Downfall ==
He was expelled from the CCP for corruption.

In 2001, he was arrested on suspicion of a crime and sentenced to death with a reprieve for corruption.

== Personal life ==
Li married Wang Xiao (王骁). This couple has two sons: Li Qun (李群) and Li Bo (李勃). On 16 September 2001, Wang Xiao committed suicide by hanging herself in the bathroom at home. Li Bo was also sentenced to 15 years in prison for his involvement in the case.

Government offices
Preceded by Zhang Delin	Mayor of Harbin; 1991–1992	Succeeded by Suo Changyou
Preceded by He Zhiqiang	Governor of Yunnan; 1998–2001	Succeeded by Xu Rongkai
