= Pu Chaozhu =

Chinese politician

Pu Chaozhu (Chinese: 普朝柱) (1929–2002) was a Chinese politician. He was born in Huaning, Yunnan Province. He was the Chinese Communist Party Committee Secretary (1985–1995) and Governor (1983–1985) of Yunnan.

Government offices
Preceded by Liu Minghui	Governor of Yunnan; 1983–1985	Succeeded by He Zhiqiang
Party political offices
Preceded by An Pingsheng	Party Secretary of Yunnan; 1985–1995	Succeeded by Gao Yan
