= Yunnan Military District =

- 中国人民解放军云南省军区
- Founded: April 1, 1950; 75 years ago
- Country: People's Republic of China
- Allegiance: Chinese Communist Party
- Type: Military district
- Role: Command and control
- Part of: People's Liberation Army
- Headquarters: Kunming, Yunnan

Commanders
- Commander: Major general (shaojiang) Lu Chuangang
- Political Commisar: Major general (shaojiang) Zheng Zhongquan

Chinese name
- Simplified Chinese: 中国人民解放军云南省军区
- Traditional Chinese: 中國人民解放軍雲南省軍區
Transcriptions
Standard Mandarin
- Hanyu Pinyin: Zhōngguó Rénmín Jiěfàngjūn Yúnnánshěng Jūnqū

The Yunnan Military District (Chinese: 中国人民解放军云南省军区; full name People's Liberation Army Yunnan Military District or PLA Yunnan Military District) is a military district of the National Defense Mobilization Department of the Central Military Commission in China.

== History ==
Yunnan Military District was established on 1 April 1950, under the jurisdiction of the Southwest Military Region of the People's Liberation Army.

== Leaders ==
=== Commanders ===
Name (English)	Name (Chinese)	Tenure begins	Tenure ends	Note
Chen Geng	陈赓	April 1950	September 1952	
Li Da	李达	September 1952	February 1954	
Xie Fuzhi	谢富治	February 1954	July 1957	
Chen Kang	陈康	1956	November 1960	
Li Xifu	黎锡福	November 1960	June 1975	
Zhang Haitang	张海棠	June 1975	April 1981	
Chen Jiagui	陈家贵	April 1981	May 1983	
Li Jinqiao	李金桥	May 1983	September 1985	
Wang Zuxun	王祖训	September 1985	December 1988	
Sun Cuiping	孙粹屏	December 1988	June 1990	
Zhu Chengyou	朱成友	June 1990	December 1993	
Yao Shuanglong	姚双龙	March 1994	March 1998	
Wang Jitang	王继堂	March 1998	January 2003	
Huang Guanghan	黄光汉	January 2003	November 2005	
Shu Yutai	舒玉泰	November 2005	July 2008	
Qiu Xingbai	邱型柏	September 2008	May 2011	
Zhang Xiaonan	张肖南	July 2011	July 2015	
Yang Guangyue	杨光跃	July 2015	January 2017	
Yang Chunguang	杨春光	April 2017	May 2020	
Lu Chuangang	鲁传刚	May 2020		

=== Political commissars ===
Name (English)	Name (Chinese)	Tenure begins	Tenure ends	Note
Song Renqiong	宋任穷	April 1950	September 1952	
Xie Fuzhi	谢富治	September 1952	July 1957	
Sun Keji	孙克骥	April 1959	March 1962	
Yu Yichuan	于一川	May 1960	May 1965	
Kong Junbiao	孔俊彪	March 1962	August 1965	
Zhou Xing	周兴	May 1965	October 1975	
Zhang Lixiong	张力雄	August 1965	June 1975	
Lei Yuangao	雷远高	April 1969	August 1979	
Gao Zhanjie	高占杰	June 1975	May 1983	
An Pingsheng	安平生	February 1977	July 1985	
Ma Zi'an	马子安	May 1979	May 1983	
Xu Yaotian	徐尧田	December 1979	May 1983	
Zhang Zhiming	张志铭	May 1983	September 1985	
Zhao Kun	赵坤	September 1985	June 1990	
Chen Lianfu	陈连富	June 1990	February 1993	
Li Jie	李杰	February 1993	December 1996	
Chen Peizhong	陈培忠	December 1996	July 1999	
Tao Changlian	陶昌廉	August 1999	August 2004	
Wang Zengbo	王增钵	August 2004	June 2007	
Lang Youliang	郎友良	August 2007	July 2010	
Yang Chengxi	杨成熙	December 2010	December 2013	
Shi Xiao	石晓	March 2014	December 2014	
Yu Yonghong	余永洪	July 2015	September 2015	
Yu Kun	余琨	September 2015	April 2023	
Zheng Zhongquan	郑仲全	April 2023		
