= Xu Rongkai =

Chinese politician

- 徐荣凯

Governor of Yunnan
- In office June 2001 – October 2006
- Party Secretary: Linghu An; Bai Enpei
- Preceded by: Li Jiating
- Succeeded by: Qin Guangrong

Personal details
- Born: 1 February 1942 (age 84) Chongqing, China
- Party: Chinese Communist Party
- Education: Tsinghua University

Chinese name
- Simplified Chinese: 徐荣凯
- Traditional Chinese: 徐榮凱
Transcriptions
Standard Mandarin
- Hanyu Pinyin: Xú Róngkǎi

Xu Rongkai (Chinese: 徐荣凯; born 1 February 1942) is a Chinese politician who served as governor of Yunnan from 2001 to 2006. He was a member of the 16th Central Committee of the Chinese Communist Party. He was a delegate to the 11th National People's Congress and a member of the Standing Committee of the 10th National People's Congress.

== Biography ==
Xu was born in Chongqing, on 1 February 1942. In 1960, he entered Tsinghua University, majoring in gas turbine. During his university years, he was president of Tsinghua University Student Union and Beijing Student Federation.

Xu joined the Chinese Communist Party (CCP) in 1960. Beginning in 1968, he served in several posts in Sichuan Dongfang Turbine Works (四川东方汽轮机厂), including technician, assistant engineer, and engineer. In August 1985, he became deputy head of Sichuan Provincial Light Industry Department, rising to head in December 1987.

In July 1991, Xu was transferred to Beijing and appointed vice minister of light industry, and held that office until May 1993, when he became vice president of China National Council of Light Industry. In July 1995, he was chosen as deputy director of the State Council Research Office, a post he kept until March 1998, when he was made deputy secretary-general of the State Council.

In May 2001, Xu was dispatched to southwest China's Yunnan province and appointed deputy party secretary. In June, he was named acting governor, confirmed in January 2002.

In October 2006, he took office as vice chairperson of the National People's Congress Education, Science, Culture and Public Health Committee.

Government offices
Preceded by Li Jiating	Governor of Yunnan; 2001–2006	Succeeded by Qin Guangrong
