= Chen Xiaoya =

Chen Xiaoya could be:

- Chen Xiaoya (politician), female, was a vice minister of the Ministry of Education of the People's Republic of China.
- Chen Xiaoya (physiologist), an academician, fellow of Chinese Academy of Sciences, plant physiologist.
