= Wang Ning (politician, born 1961) =

Chinese politician (born 1961)

- 王宁
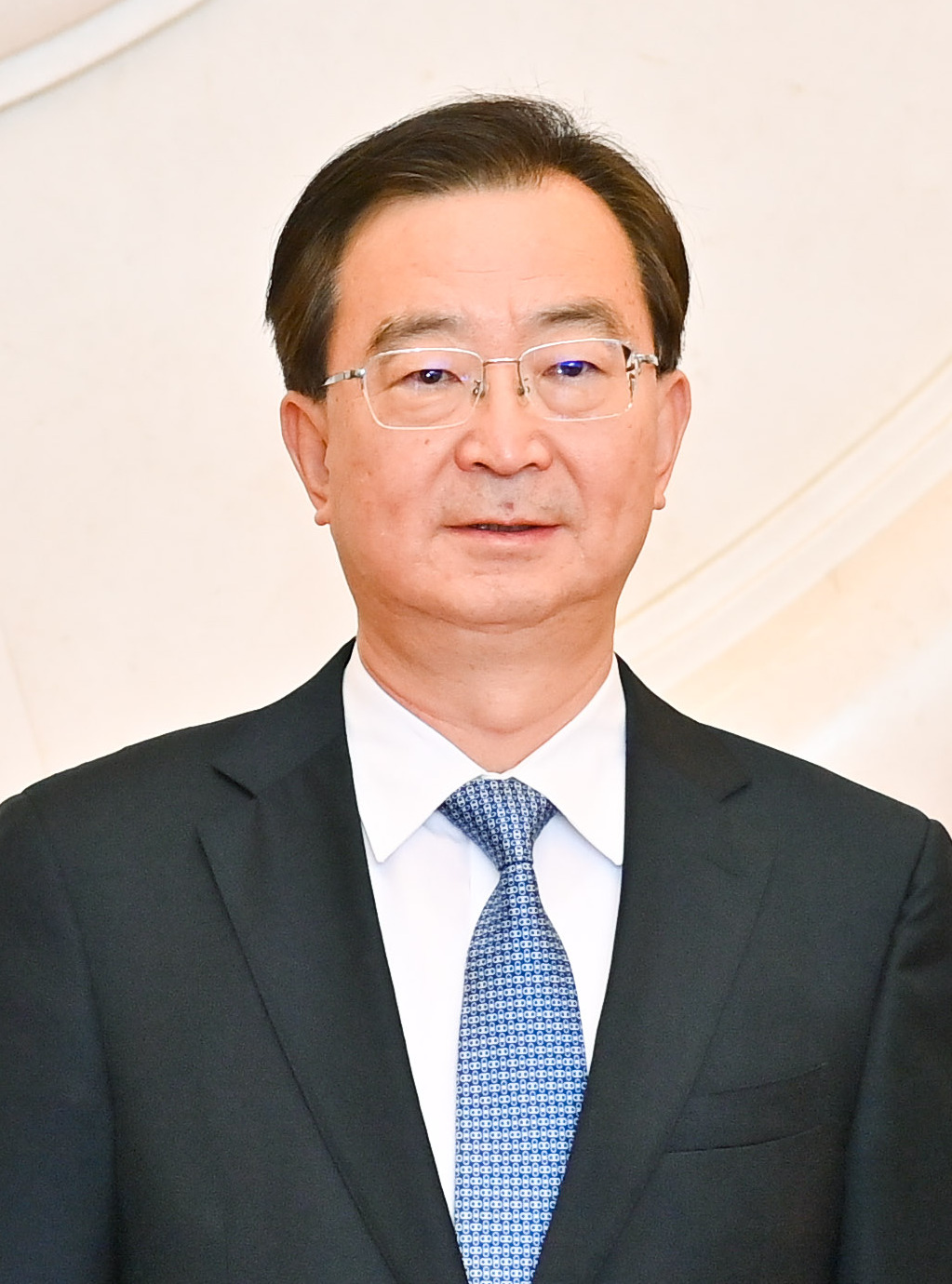
- Wang in 2023

Party Secretary of Yunnan
- In office 19 October 2021 – 24 October 2026
- Deputy: Wang Yubo (governor)
- Preceded by: Ruan Chengfa
- Succeeded by: Mo Gaoyi

Chairman of the Standing Committee of the Yunnan Provincial People's Congress
- Incumbent
- Assumed office January 2022
- Preceded by: Ruan Chengfa

Governor of Fujian
- In office 2 July 2020 – 22 October 2021
- Party Secretary: Yu Weiguo; Yin Li
- Preceded by: Tang Dengjie
- Succeeded by: Zhao Long

Party Secretary of Fuzhou
- In office June 2017 – August 2020
- Preceded by: Ni Yuefeng
- Succeeded by: Lin Baojin

Personal details
- Born: April 1961 (age 65) Shenyang, China
- Party: Chinese Communist Party
- Education: Shenyang Jianzhu University

Chinese name
- Traditional Chinese: 王寧
- Simplified Chinese: 王宁
Transcriptions
Standard Mandarin
- Hanyu Pinyin: Wāng Níng

Wang Ning (Chinese: 王宁; born April 1961) is a Chinese politician who previously served as party secretary of Yunnan. He is an alternate and then a member of the 19th Central Committee of the Chinese Communist Party.

== Biography ==
Wang was born in Shenyang, Liaoning, in April 1961. He graduated from Liaoning Architectural Engineering Institute (now Shenyang Jianzhu University).

He joined the Chinese Communist Party in June 1983. He served in the Ministry of Construction and then Ministry of Housing and Urban-Rural Development, where he was promoted to become its vice-minister in July 2013.

In December 2015, he was transferred to southeast China's Fujian province and appointed head of the Organization Department of the Fujian Provincial Committee of the Chinese Communist Party. In June 2017, he was appointed mayor of Fuzhou and secretary of the Party Working Committee of Fuzhou New Development Zone. He became Deputy Party Secretary of Fujian in May 2018. On July 2, 2020, he was named acting governor of Fujian, replacing Tang Dengjie. On September 15, he was installed as governor of Fujian.

On 19 October 2021, he was transferred to southwest China's Yunnan province and appointed party secretary, the top political position in the province.

In October 2022, he became a member of the 19th Central Committee of the Chinese Communist Party.

On 24 October 2026, Wang was stepped down the post due to reaching the retiring age. On 6 November 2026, he was appointed as the vice chairman of the National People's Congress Ethnic Affairs Committee at the 25th meeting of the Standing Committee of the 14th National People's Congress.

Government offices
Preceded by Jiang Xinzhi	Head of the Organization Department of the Fujian Provincial Committee of the Communis; 2015–2017	Succeeded by Hu Changsheng
Preceded by Tang Dengjie	Governor of Fujian; 2020–2021	Succeeded by Zhao Long
Party political offices
Preceded by Ni Yuefeng	Deputy Party Secretary of Fujian; 2018–2020	Succeeded by Hu Changsheng
Preceded by Ni Yuefeng	Party Secretary of Fuzhou; 2017–2020	Succeeded by Lin Baojin (林宝金)
Preceded by Ruan Chengfa	Party Secretary of Yunnan; 2021–2026	Succeeded by Mo Gaoyi
Assembly seats
Preceded by Chen Hao	Chairman of Yunnan People's Congress; 2021–present	Incumbent
