= Li Genshen =

Chinese politician

- 李根深

Communist Party Secretary of Harbin
- In office March 1985 – August 1991
- Deputy: Gong benyan Zhang Delin; Li Jiating (mayor)
- Preceded by: Tian Fengshan
- Succeeded by: Wang Zhao

Personal details
- Born: July 1930 Wuxing County, Zhejiang, China
- Died: 9 October 2015 (aged 85) Harbin, Heilongjiang, China
- Party: Chinese Communist Party
- Education: Shanghai Jiao Tong University; Moscow Power Engineering Institute

Li Genshen (Chinese: 李根深; pinyin: Lǐ Gēnshēn; July 1930 – 9 October 2015) was a Chinese politician who served as party secretary of Harbin from 1985 to 1991.

He was a member of the 13th Central Committee of the Chinese Communist Party.

== Career ==
Li was born in Wuxing County (now Huzhou), Zhejiang, in July 1930. He joined the Chinese Communist Party (CCP) in December 1947.

After graduating from Shanghai Jiao Tong University in 1951, he stayed for teaching. In 1952, he was selected by the Chinese government to study gas turbine at the Graduate Department of Moscow Power Engineering Institute in the Soviet Union and obtained an associate doctoral degree.

After returning in 1956, he successively served as deputy chief designer, deputy chief engineer, chief engineer, deputy director, deputy party secretary of the Harbin Turbine Factory and the 3rd Research Academy of the 7th Research Institute of the Ministry of National Defense.

He was appointed secretary-general of the CCP Heilongjiang Provincial Committee in 1983 and was admitted to member of the CCP Heilongjiang Provincial Committee, the province's top authority. In 1985, he was made party secretary of Harbin, his first foray into a prefectural leadership role. He was chosen as vice chairperson of the Heilongjiang Provincial People's Congress in 1992, serving in the post until his retirement in March 1996.

On 9 October 2015, he died from an illness in Harbin, Heilongjiang, at the age of 85.

Party political offices
Preceded by Tian Fengshan	Communist Party Secretary of Harbin; 1985–1991	Succeeded by Wang Zhao
