= Zhou Xing =

Zhou Xing may refer to:

- Zhou Xing (secret police official) (died c. 691), secret police official of the Tang Dynasty
- Zhou Xing (politician) (1905–1975), Chinese politician
