= Li Jiheng =

Chinese politician (born 1957)

- 李纪恒

Minister of Civil Affairs
- In office 26 October 2019 – 28 February 2022
- Premier: Li Keqiang
- Preceded by: Huang Shuxian
- Succeeded by: Tang Dengjie

Party Secretary of Inner Mongolia
- In office 29 August 2016 – 25 October 2019
- Preceded by: Wang Jun
- Succeeded by: Shi Taifeng

Party Secretary of Yunnan
- In office October 2014 – 27 August 2016
- Preceded by: Qin Guangrong
- Succeeded by: Chen Hao

Governor of Yunnan
- In office August 2011 – October 2014
- Preceded by: Qin Guangrong
- Succeeded by: Chen Hao

Personal details
- Born: January 1957 (age 69) Gui County, Guangxi (Now Guigang, Guangxi)
- Party: Chinese Communist Party
- Education: Guangxi University; Chinese Academy of Social Sciences

Chinese name
- Simplified Chinese: 李纪恒
- Traditional Chinese: 李紀恆
Transcriptions
Standard Mandarin
- Hanyu Pinyin: Lǐ Jǐhéng

Li Jiheng (Chinese: 李纪恒; born January 1957) is a Chinese politician, who former served as Minister of Civil Affairs. He also is the former Party Secretary of Inner Mongolia, the former Party Secretary and Governor of Yunnan province and a former Deputy Party Chief of Guangxi Zhuang Autonomous Region.

== Career ==
=== Guangxi ===
Li Jiheng is a native of Guigang, Guangxi Zhuang Autonomous Region. He joined the Chinese Communist Party in October 1976, at the age of 19. From November 1976 to August 1979 Li studied at the Department of Chinese of Guangxi University.

From 1985 to 1991 Li Jiheng served as Deputy Communist Party Chief of Gui County (now Guigang City), and Party Chief of Pingnan County and Guiping County, all in Guangxi. He was promoted to Deputy Party Chief of Hechi prefecture in 1991, and Party Chief in 1995. In 1996 he was transferred to nearby Yulin prefecture to become its Communist Party Chief.

From 1999 to 2003 Li was a part-time student at the Graduate School of the Chinese Academy of Social Sciences, where he studied Administration of Agricultural Economy and obtained a doctoral degree.

In 2001 Li Jiheng became the Party Chief of Nanning, the capital of Guangxi, and in March 2005 he was promoted to Deputy Party Chief of Guangxi Zhuang Autonomous Region.

=== Yunnan ===
In July 2006 Li Jiheng was transferred to the neighbouring province of Yunnan to become its Deputy Party Secretary. In August 2011 he was appointed Acting Governor of Yunnan, succeeding Qin Guangrong, who was promoted to Communist Party Chief of the province. In February 2012 Li was elected Governor by the Yunnan Provincial Congress. In October 2014, Li was appointed Party Chief of Yunnan, replacing Qin Guangrong.

Li was an alternate member of the 15th, 16th, and 17th Central Committees of the Chinese Communist Party. He is a full member of the 18th Central Committee.

=== Inner Mongolia ===
In August 2016, Li Jiheng was appointed as the Party Secretary of Inner Mongolia by the CCP Central Committee.

=== Ministry of Civil Affairs ===
On October 26, 2019, Li Jiheng was appointed as the Minister of Civil Affairs by the Standing Committee of the National People's Congress.

=== National People's Congress ===
On February 28, 2022, he became vice chairperson of the National People's Congress Agriculture and Rural Affairs Committee.

Party political offices
Preceded by Zhou Guisen (周桂森)	Party Secretary of Pingnan County; 1988–1990	Succeeded by Tu Yunbiao (涂运彪)
New title	Party Secretary of Yulin; 1997–2001	Succeeded by Fang Hao
Preceded by Li Ke	Party Secretary of Nanning; 2001–2005	Succeeded by Ma Biao
Preceded by Qin Guangrong	Deputy Party Secretary of Yunnan; 2006–2011	Succeeded by Qiu He
Preceded by Qin Guangrong	Party Secretary of Yunnan; 2014–2016	Succeeded by Chen Hao
Preceded by Wang Jun	Party Secretary of Inner Mongolia; 2016–2019	Succeeded by Shi Taifeng
Government offices
Preceded by Qin Guangrong	Governor of Yunnan; 2011–2014	Succeeded by Chen Hao
Preceded by Huang Shuxian	Minister of Civil Affairs; 2019–2022	Succeeded by Tang Dengjie
Assembly seats
Preceded by Qin Guangrong	Chairman of Yunnan Provincial People's Congress; 2015–2016	Succeeded by Chen Hao
Preceded by Wang Jun	Chairman of Inner Mongolia Regional People's Congress; 2017–2019	Succeeded by Shi Taifeng
