= Tan Furen =

Founding PLA general assassinated in Kunming

Lieutenant General Tan Furen
- 谭甫仁
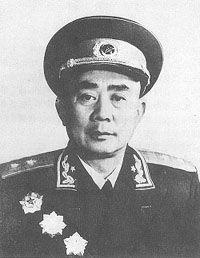

Personal details
- Born: 1 April 1910 Renhua, Guangdong, Great Qing
- Died: December 17, 1970 (aged 60) Kunming, Yunnan, China
- Cause of death: Assassination
- Awards: August 1 Medal (Second Class); Order of Independence and Freedom (First Class); Order of Liberation (First Class)

Military service
- Allegiance: Communist China
- Branch/service: People's Liberation Army Ground Force
- Years of service: 1927-1970
- Rank: Lieutenant General
- Battles/wars: Second Sino-Japanese War; Chinese Civil War

Tan Furen (Chinese: 谭甫仁) (April 1, 1910 – December 17, 1970) was a Chinese politician and lieutenant general in the People's Liberation Army. Born in Renhua County, Guangdong Province, he was governor of Yunnan Province. A veteran of the Nanchang Uprising and Chinese Civil War, he was assassinated in Kunming, during the Cultural Revolution, by an officer who was under investigation for misconduct.

He was a member of the 9th Central Committee of the Chinese Communist Party from April 1969 until his December 1970 death. At the time of his death he was noted to be a member of the Central Military Affairs Commission.

Preceded by Zhou Xing	Governor of Yunnan	Succeeded by Zhou Xing

== See also ==
- Zhao Jianmin Spy Case
- Shadian incident
