= Chen Xiaoya (politician) =

Chinese politician

Chen Xiaoya (born March 1953, Chinese: 陈小娅), female, originally from Shashi, Hubei, is a politician in the People's Republic of China.

== Biography ==
She obtained her degree from Huazhong University of Science and Technology, specializing in electronic materials and components, and became a member of the Chinese Communist Party in December 1974.

In 1998, she was appointed director of the Department of Policy Research and Legal Construction at the Ministry of Education of the People's Republic of China. In 2001, she assumed the role of assistant to the governor of the People's Government of Yunnan Province. In 2003, she assumed the role of assistant to the minister of the Ministry of Education and director of the Department of Basic Education. In 2004, she was appointed vice minister of the Ministry of Education. In December 2010, she was appointed vice minister of the Ministry of Science and Technology of the People's Republic of China. In March 2014, he resigned from his position as Vice Minister of the Ministry of Science and Technology of the People's Republic of China.
