= Yu Yonghong =

- 余永洪

Secretary of People's Liberation Army Ground Force Commission for Discipline Inspection
- Incumbent
- Assumed office April 2019
- Preceded by: Wu Gang

Political Commissar of the 79th Group Army
- In office March 2017 – April 2019
- Preceded by: New title
- Succeeded by: Zhang Xiao

Political Commissar of the 14th Group Army
- In office September 2015 – 2017
- Preceded by: Huang Jixiang
- Succeeded by: Position abolished

Personal details
- Born: May 1963 (age 63) Nanchong, Sichuan, China
- Party: Chinese Communist Party
- Education

Military service
- Allegiance: People's Republic of China
- Branch/service: People's Liberation Army Ground Force
- Rank: Lieutenant general

Yu Yonghong (Chinese: 余永洪; pinyin: Yú Yónghóng; born May 1963) is a lieutenant general (zhongjiang) of the People's Liberation Army (PLA). He has been Secretary of People's Liberation Army Ground Force Commission for Discipline Inspection since April 2019, and formerly served as Political Commissar of the 79th Group Army.

== Biography ==
Yu was born in Nanchong, Sichuan in May 1963. He served in Chengdu Military Region and Tibet Military District for a long time. In April 2011, he was appointed Director of Political Department of the 14th Group Army, a position he held until March 2015, when he was appointed Deputy Director of Political Department of the Chengdu Military Region. He was Political Commissar of the Yunnan Military District in July 2015, and held that office until September 2015. He became Political Commissar of the 14th Group Army in September 2015, and served until March 2017, when he was appointed Political Commissar of the 79th Group Army. In April 2019, he rose to become Secretary of People's Liberation Army Ground Force Commission for Discipline Inspection, replacing Wu Gang. On December 11, 2019, he was awarded the military rank of lieutenant general (zhongjiang) by Central Military Commission chairman Xi Jinping.

Military offices
Preceded by Shi Xiao (石晓)	Political Commissar of the Yunnan Military District; 2015–2015	Succeeded by Yu Kun (余琨)
Preceded by Huang Jixiang (黄集骧)	Political Commissar of the 14th Group Army; 2015–2017	Succeeded by Position abolished
New title	Political Commissar of the 79th Group Army; 2017–2019	Succeeded by Zhang Xiao (张晓)
Preceded by Wu Gang (吴刚)	Secretary of People's Liberation Army Ground Force Commission for Discipline Inspection; 2019	Incumbent
