= Tian Fengshan =

Chinese politician

- 田凤山

Minister of Land and Resources
- In office March 2000 – October 2003
- Premier: Zhu Rongji
- Preceded by: Zhou Yongkang
- Succeeded by: Sun Wensheng

Governor of Heilongjiang
- In office February 1995 – December 1999
- Party Secretary: Yue Qifeng; Xu Youfang
- Preceded by: Shao Qihui
- Succeeded by: Song Fatang

Party Secretary of Harbin
- In office August 1991 – November 1994
- Deputy: Li Jiating; Suo Changyou
- Preceded by: Li Genshen
- Succeeded by: Suo Changyou

Personal details
- Born: December 8, 1941 (age 84) Zhaoyuan County, Heilongjiang, China
- Party: Chinese Communist Party
- Education: PLA Rocket Force University of Engineering

Chinese name
- Simplified Chinese: 田凤山
- Traditional Chinese: 田鳳山
Transcriptions
Standard Mandarin
- Hanyu Pinyin: Tián Fèngshān

Tian Fengshan (Chinese: 田凤山; born 8 December 1940) is a former Chinese politician who was convicted of corruption and sentenced to life in prison.

== Biography ==
Tian was born in Zhaoyuan County, Heilongjiang, on 8 December 1940, while his ancestral home in Penglai, Yantai, Shandong. He is the elder of three children. His second younger brother Tian Fengchun (田凤春) once served as party secretary of Zhaoyuan County and vice mayor of Daqing. His third younger brother worked in the Zhaoyuan County Traffic Police Brigade and now lives in downtown Zhaoyuan County after retirement. Tian attended Zhaoyuan County No. 1 High School. In 1961, Tian was accepted to the PLA Second Artillery Technical College (now PLA Rocket Force University of Engineering), but dropped out of college for health reasons during his sophomore year.

After returning hometown, Tian was arranged to work as a substitute teacher at Yishun Township Central Primary School (义顺乡中心小学). Two years later, he was transferred to the neighboring Chengjiao People's Commune (城郊人民公社) and appointed party secretary. In December 1977, he rose to become deputy magistrate, deputy party secretary of Zhaoyuan County, and a member of the CCP Zhaoyuan County Committee, the county's top authority.

His positions include: Heilongjiang governor (February 1995), Minister of Land and Resources (March 2000).

== Downfall ==
Tian was removed from this position in October 2003. In September 2004, the 4th plenary session of the 16th National Congress of the Chinese Communist Party decided to deprive Tian of the membership of Central Committee of the Chinese Communist Party and expel him from the party. On December 27, 2005, charged with bribery, Tian was given a life sentence by the Beijing Second Intermediate People's Court, with life-time political privileges being removed and all his personal belongings confiscated.

Tian was an alternate member of the 14th Central Committee of the Chinese Communist Party, and a full member of the 15th and 16th Central Committees.

Party political offices
Preceded by Li Genshen	Party Secretary of Harbin; 1991–1994	Succeeded by Suo Changyou
Government offices
Preceded by Shao Qihui	Governor of Heilongjiang; 1995–2000	Succeeded by Song Fatang
Preceded by Zhou Yongkang	Minister of Land and Resources; 2000–2003	Succeeded by Sun Wensheng
