= Mo Gaoyi =

Chinese politician

- 莫高义

Party Secretary of Yunnan
- Incumbent
- Assumed office 24 October 2026
- Deputy: Liu Qifan (Acting Governor); Liu Hongjian
- Preceded by: Wang Ning

Director of the State Council Information Office
- In office 11 April 2024 – 3 November 2026
- Preceded by: Sun Yeli
- Succeeded by: Vacant

Personal details
- Born: December 1964 (age 61) Shishou, Hubei, China
- Party: Chinese Communist Party (1989-)
- Education: Central China Normal University; Sun Yat-sen University; University of Massachusetts Boston

Mo Gaoyi (Chinese: 莫高义; born December 1964) is a Chinese politician, currently serving as the Party Secretary of Yunnan since October 2026. Previously he served as the deputy head of the Publicity Department of the Chinese Communist Party and the director of the State Council Information Office.

== Career ==
Mo was born in Shishou, Hubei in December 1964. He was enrolled to history department of Central China Normal University in 1983, and graduated in 1987. He was also studied in history department of Sun Yat-sen University from 1987 to 1990, and the University of Massachusetts Boston from 2000 to 2001.

=== Guangdong ===
After graduation in August 1990, Mo was enrolled to the Guangdong Socialism Academy, and served as the teacher and secretary. In 1993, he was transferred to the External Publicity Office of the Guangdong Provincial Committee of the Chinese Communist Party. He was appointed as the deputy director in 1999.

In 2010, Mo was appointed as the deputy head of the Publicity Department of the CCP Guangdong Provincial Committee and the director of the Information Office of the Guangdong Provincial People's Government.

In 2013, Mo was appointed as the president of the Nanfang Daily Newspaper Group. He was also elected as the deputy president of the All-China Journalists Association in 2016.

In March 2017, Mo was appointed as the party secretary of Shaoguan.

=== Publicity department ===
In December 2018, Mo was appointed as the head of the Publicity Department of the Central Commission for Discipline Inspection and the National Supervisory Commission. He was served as the director of the discipline inspection group of the People's Daily from March 2020.

In March 2021, Mo was appointed as the standing member and the head of the Publicity Department of the Beijing Municipal Committee of the Chinese Communist Party.

In April 2024, Mo was appointed as the director of the State Council Information Office, replacing Sun Yeli.

=== Yunnan ===
On 24 October 2026, Mo was appointed as the party secretary of Yunnan.

Party political offices
| Preceded by Jiang Ling | Party Secretary of Shaoguan; 2017–2018 | Succeeded by Li Hongjun |
| Preceded by Du Feijin | Head of the Publicity Department of the Beijing Municipal Committee of the Chinese Communist Party; 2021–2024 | Succeeded by Sun Junmin |
| Preceded by Wang Ning | Party Secretary of Yunnan; 2026– | Incumbent |
Government offices
| Preceded by Sun Yeli | Director of the State Council Information Office; 2024–2026 | Vacant |
