= Ruan Chengfa =

Chinese politician

- 阮成发

Party Secretary of Yunnan
- In office 20 November 2020 – 19 October 2021
- Deputy: Wang Yubo
- Preceded by: Chen Hao
- Succeeded by: Wang Ning

Chairman of Yunnan People's Congress
- In office January – November 2021
- Preceded by: Chen Hao
- Succeeded by: Wang Ning

Governor of Yunnan
- In office 13 December 2016 – 25 November 2020
- Party Secretary: Chen Hao
- Preceded by: Chen Hao
- Succeeded by: Wang Yubo

Party Secretary of Wuhan
- In office 30 January 2011 – 13 December 2016
- Preceded by: Yang Song
- Succeeded by: Chen Yixin

Personal details
- Born: 10 October 1957 (age 68) Wuhan, Hubei, China
- Party: Chinese Communist Party
- Education: Wuhan University; Central China Normal University

Chinese name
- Simplified Chinese: 阮成发
- Traditional Chinese: 阮成發
Transcriptions
Standard Mandarin
- Hanyu Pinyin: Ruǎn Chéngfā

Ruan Chengfa (Chinese: 阮成发; born 10 October 1957) is a Chinese politician who served as Party Secretary and Governor of Yunnan, and before that, Communist Party Secretary of Wuhan, mayor of Huangshi, head of the General Office of the Hubei Provincial Government, vice governor of Hubei, and party chief of Xiangfan. Ruan is an alternate of the 18th Central Committee of the Chinese Communist Party and a member of the 19th Central Committee of the Chinese Communist Party.

== Early life and education ==
Ruan was born in Wuhan. He began working in 1979 as a textiles worker in a local clothing factory. He joined the Communist Party in 1982. He studied international communism at the Central China Normal University and also has a doctorate in law. In 1994, he took charge of the Wuhan securities commission. In September 1995, he became party chief of Wuchang District. In December 1997, he was named secretary-general of the Wuhan party committee. In March 1998, the mayor of Huangshi; in November 2011, the secretary-general of the Hubei provincial government; in December 2002, the party chief of Xiangfan; in September 2004, the Vice-Governor of Hubei.

He was named mayor of Wuhan in January 2008. In January 2011, he was promoted to party chief of Wuhan; as party boss of the provincial capital, he also sat on the Hubei provincial Party Standing Committee.

== Career in Wuhan ==
After Ruan ascended to leading positions in Wuhan, abundant construction activity took place all over the city. Some 5,500 construction sites were operating simultaneously. Some Wuhan locals named him "Manchengwa" (满城挖), a play on his name that literally meant "digs all over town." To this, Ruan responded, "I'm not scared of people calling me 'Manchengwa'. If we're not doing construction, we are doing a disservice to the city." The intense construction work was blamed for extensive flooding after heavy rain in June 2011.

Ruan was credited with explosive infrastructure growth, such as the construction of the Second Ring Road of Wuhan, the Baishazhou Avenue, and the Wuhan Metro Line 8. The projects significantly reduced commute times and eased congestion across the city. However, the endless construction also burdened the city's financial system. In 2011, total planned investment amounted to over 70 billion yuan (~$10 billion). To recoup the massive construction costs, the city issued debt through special financial vehicles, backed up by municipal land as collateral, which typically did not show up on the city's balance sheet (although this practice was common in other Chinese cities as well, at the time), including perpetual bonds.

== Career in Yunnan ==
Having been born in Wuhan and having spent his entire career in his home province, it seemed like Ruan's career was headed to an unceremonious close as he approached the mandatory retirement age for sub-provincial level officials of 60. However, in December 2016, Ruan suddenly transferred to Yunnan province. On December 13, Ruan was appointed as the Governor of Yunnan. On December 28, at the dedication ceremony of the Shanghai–Kunming High-Speed Railway in Kunming, Ruan mispronounced the abbreviation of the province Zhen instead of Dian while reading off of a script, prompting mockery online, including comments that a doctorate in law should know better.

In November 2020, Ruan was appointed as the CCP Secretary of Yunnan.

== Central government ==
On 23 October 2021, he was appointed vice chairperson of the National People's Congress Social Development Affairs Committee.

Government offices
Preceded by Ren Shimao	Mayor of Huangshi; 1998–2001	Succeeded by Xiao Xuming
Preceded by Jiao Junxian	Secretary-General of Hubei Provincial People's Government; 2001–2002	Succeeded by Li Chunming
Preceded by Li Xiansheng	Mayor of Wuhan; 2008–2011	Succeeded by Tang Liangzhi
Preceded by Chen Hao	Governor of Yunnan; 2016–2020	Succeeded by Wang Yubo
Party political offices
Preceded by Sun Chuyin	Party Secretary of Xiangyang; 2002–2004	Succeeded by Tian Chengzhong
Preceded by Yang Song	Party Secretary of Wuhan; 2011–2016	Succeeded by Chen Yixin
Preceded by Chen Hao	Party Secretary of Yunnan; 2020–2021	Succeeded by Wang Ning
Assembly seats
Preceded by Chen Hao	Chairman of Yunnan People's Congress; 2021	Succeeded by Wang Ning
