= Yao Shuanglong =

Chinese general

- 姚双龙

Commander of the Yunnan Military District
- In office March 1994 – March 1998
- Preceded by: Zhu Chengyou
- Succeeded by: Wang Jitang

Personal details
- Born: 1936 Heqing County, Yunnan, China
- Died: 2023 (aged 86–87) Kunming, Yunnan, China
- Party: Chinese Communist Party

Military service
- Allegiance: People's Republic of China
- Branch/service: People's Liberation Army Ground Force
- Years of service: 1956–1998
- Rank: Major general
- Battles/wars: Chinese Civil War; Sino-Vietnamese War

Chinese name
- Simplified Chinese: 姚双龙
- Traditional Chinese: 姚雙龍
Transcriptions
Standard Mandarin
- Hanyu Pinyin: Yáo Shuānglóng

Yao Shuanglong (Chinese: 姚双龙; 1936 – 1 February 2023) was a major general in the People's Liberation Army of China who served as commander of the Yunnan Military District from 1994 to 1998.

== Biography ==
Yao was born into an ethnic Bai family in Heqing County, Yunnan, in 1936.

In 1956, Yao Shuanglong, who enlisted in the People's Liberation Army (PLA) at the age of 19, participated in the battle to suppress the rebellion in Xikang Province. In May 1981, Yao, the than commander of the 126th Regiment of the 42nd Division of the 14th Army, led his troops to recapture the Koulin Mountain (扣林山). In 1985, Yao became deputy commander of the Yunnan Military District, rising to commander in 1994. He attained the rank of major general (shaojiang) in 1988.

Yao died in Kunming, on 1 February 2023.

== Autobiography ==
- 血色征程 [Bloody Journey] (in Chinese). Kunming, Yunnan: Yunnan People's Publishing House. 2011. ISBN 9787222085626.

Military offices
Preceded by Zhu Chengyou	Commander of the Yunnan Military District; 1994–1998	Succeeded by Wang Jitang
