= Zhao Jianmin spy case =

- Part of Cultural Revolution in China
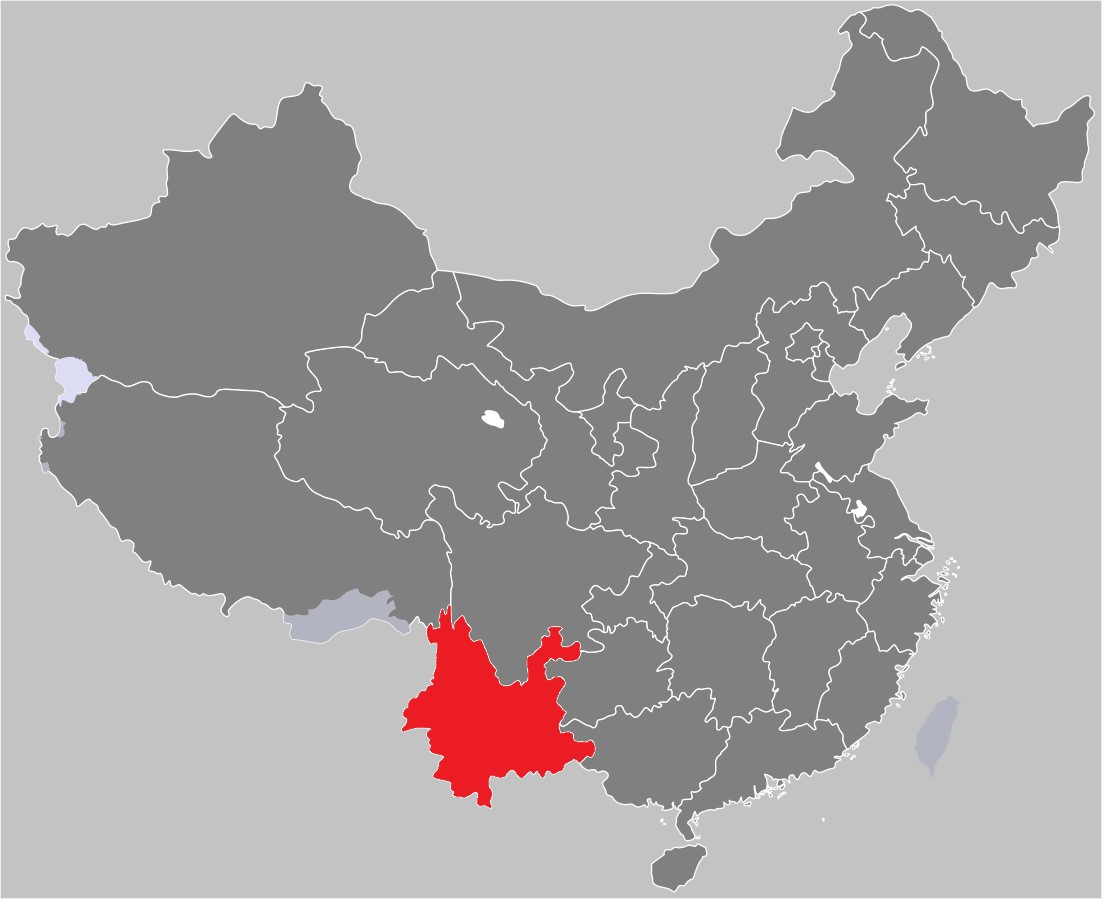
- Yunnan Province (in red)
- Native name: 赵建民特务案件
- Location: Yunnan Province, Southern China, Kunming and various other townships and cities
- Date: 1968-1969
- Target: Zhao Jianmin, "capitalist roaders", political enemies of Mao Zedong, alleged KMT spies and local provincial government officials
- Attack type: Political persecution, political infighting, instigation of political violence
- Deaths: 17,000
- Injuries: 63,000 (Estimated)
- Victim: 1.387 million
- Perpetrators: Chinese Communist Party, Kang Sheng (head of the Central Social Affairs Department)
- Motive: Persecution of political enemies of Mao Zedong, political infighting, consolidation of power

The Zhao Jianmin spy case (simplified Chinese: 赵健民特务案; traditional Chinese: 趙健民特務案; pinyin: Zhào Jiànmín tèwu àn), or Zhao Jianmin wrong case (赵健民冤案; 趙健民冤案; Zhào Jiànmín yuān'àn), was a major fabricated spy case in Yunnan province during the Chinese Cultural Revolution, with more than 1.387 million people implicated and persecuted, which accounted for 6% of the total population in Yunnan at the time. From 1968–1969, more than 17,000 people died in a massacre while 61,000 people were crippled for life; in Kunming (the capital of Yunnan) alone, 1,473 people were killed and 9,661 people were left disabled as a result.

== Brief history ==
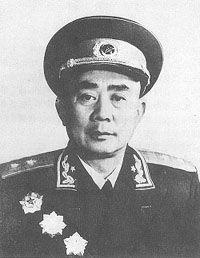
Tan Furen, the lieutenant general of the People's Liberation Army who was in charge of the purge.

In March 1967, Zhao Jianmin, then provincial secretary of the Communist Party in Yunnan, suggested to Kang Sheng in person that the Chinese Communist Party (CCP) should resolve the issues of Cultural Revolution in a democratic manner, but receiving no immediate response from the latter. However, Kang Sheng (then head of the party's internal intelligence agency of the Central Social Affairs Department) wrote a secret report on Zhao to Mao Zedong afterwards, claiming that Zhao opposed the Central Committee of CCP, Chairman Mao and the Cultural Revolution.

In August 1967, Mao Zedong as well as the Central Committee of CCP approved that the national and local media may publicly criticize "capitalist roaders" among the top provincial officials in China. A total of 55 high-ranking officials were criticized, including Zhao Jianmin.

In 1968, Zhao Jianmin was branded by Kang Sheng and his allies as "a spy of Kuomintang (KMT)" as well as "traitor", and was regarded as one of the "local proxies" of Liu Shaoqi, the President of China who was persecuted to death in 1969 as a "traitor" and "capitalist roader". Zhao was subsequenrly imprisoned for 8 years.

At the same time, a massive search and purge of members of the fabricated "Zhao Jianmin KMT Spy Agency in Yunnan" was carried out, resulting in the arrest and persecution of more than 1.38 million civilians and officials. Tan Furen, a lieutenant general in the People's Liberation Army, was appointed by Mao Zedong and the Central Committee of CCP to take charge of the purge.

== Aftermath ==
On December 17, 1970, Tan Furen and his wife were assassinated.

After the Cultural Revolution, Zhao Jianmin was officially rehabilitated during the "Boluan Fanzheng" period and subsequently became a vice director of the Third Ministry of Machine Building.

== See also ==
- Mass killings under communist regimes
- List of massacres in China
- Shadian incident
- February Countercurrent
- Boluan Fanzheng
