= Emblem and flag of the Chinese Communist Party =

Emblem of the Chinese Communist Party

Versions
- Armiger: Chinese Communist Party
- Adopted: 21 September 1996
- Shield: A hammer and a sickle in saltire, both Gules

Flag of the Chinese Communist Party
- Use: Political flag
- Proportion: 2∶3
- Adopted: 21 September 1996
- Design: A red field with the party emblem at the canton.

The emblem of the Chinese Communist Party is the hammer and sickle displayed in golden yellow or red, while its flag is red with a gold party emblem displayed in the canton.

The CCP initially did not have a single official standard flag, instead using various flags from the Communist Party of the Soviet Union and the Kuomintang. In 1942, the CCP Politburo decreed the establishment of a sole official flag. There were further tweaks in the design between 1982 to 1987. The CCP General Office officially standardized the design of the hammer and sickle in 1996. According to Article 53 of the constitution of the Chinese Communist Party, "the Party emblem and flag are the symbol and sign of the Communist Party of China." The flag is regulated by the "Regulations on the Emblem and Flag of the Communist Party of China", which was adopted by the CCP Central Committee in 2021.

Emblem of the Chinese Communist Party
- Simplified Chinese: 中国共产党党徽
- Traditional Chinese: 中國共產黨黨徽
Transcriptions
Standard Mandarin
- Hanyu Pinyin: Zhōngguó Gòngchǎndǎng Dǎnghuī

Flag of the Chinese Communist Party
- Simplified Chinese: 中国共产党党旗
- Traditional Chinese: 中國共產黨黨旗
Transcriptions
Standard Mandarin
- Hanyu Pinyin: Zhōngguó Gòngchǎndǎng Dǎngqí

== History ==
At the beginning of its history, the Chinese Communist Party (CCP) did not have a single official standard for the flag, but instead allowed individual party committees to copy the flag of the Communist Party of the Soviet Union. During the First United Front with the Kuomintang, the CCP temporarily put down the red flag and carried the Blue Sky with a White Sun flag representing the Kuomintang. This was still the case even during the Nanchang uprising, when the CCP battled the Kuomintang. The specific specifications and styles of the various party flags used thereafter were not entirely the same.

On 28 April 1942, the CCP Politburo decreed the establishment of a sole official flag. "The flag of the Communist Party of China has the length-to-width proportion of 3:2 with a hammer and sickle in the upper-left corner, and with no five-pointed star. The Political Bureau authorizes the General Office to custom-make a number of standard flags and distribute them to all major organs". The first batch of standard party flags of the CCP was created in the Yan'an Soviet. On 11 October 1942, the CCP Publicity Department replied to the General Political Department of the Military Commission, "agreeing to use the provisional design for the Party flag before a unified standard is established." On 17 June 1951, the CCP Central Committee responded to the East China Bureau's request for instructions on the design of the Party flag: "Before the Party Central Committee formally stipulates a unified design for the Party flag, on the occasion of the 30th anniversary of the Party, all localities may follow the old practice and uniformly adopt a red flag with a sickle and hammer, without adding the words 'Communist Party of China' to the flag."

Between 1982 and 1987, in order to beautify the shape of the sickle and hammer (in order to visually distinguish it from the party emblems of other countries), the top party emblem designers made subtle adjustments to the CCP emblem. The most obvious change was that the "sickle handle" became round. However, since it was not written into the rules and regulations at the time, the shape of the sickle and hammer party emblem varied. According to an article published by Tsinghua University, at the 13th National Congress of the Chinese Communist Party held in October 1987, a hammer and sickle with a new design was hung in the Great Hall of the People, where the congress was being held. The sickle's handle was changed from a square to a round shape, and the hammerhead was changed from being entirely square to notched, which resembled today's design. At the 14th National Congress of the Chinese Communist Party in 1992, the same, updated design was displayed, although some official materials, such as postage stamps, still featured the older design.

On 21 September 1996, the CCP General Office issued "Regulations on the Production and Use of the Communist Party of China Flag and Emblem", which stated that the emblem and flag were the official symbols and signs of the party, and officially standardized the design of the hammer and sickle. There was a significant change in the style of the Party emblem's sickle, with the rectangular handle having been changed to a circle. The regulations also mentioned that in places where the national flag should be raised according to the National Flag Law, the Party flag should not be hung at the same time. On 14 November 2002, the 16th National Congress of the Chinese Communist Party added a chapter on the Party emblem and flag as Chapter 11 in the Party Constitution. On 26 June 2021, the CCP Central Committee issued the "Regulations on the Emblem and Flag of the Communist Party of China". The regulations mainly refer to the "Several Provisions on the Production and Use of the Emblem and Flag of the Communist Party of China" and clarify the color values of the emblem and flag.

== Symbolism ==
According to Article 53 of the constitution of the Chinese Communist Party, "the Party emblem and flag are the symbol and sign of the Communist Party of China." According to the Chinese government, "hammer and sickle together symbolise the working tools of workers and farmers. The emblem in general symbolizes that the Chinese Communist Party is the vanguard of the Chinese working class, and it represents the fundamental interests of the working class and the big majority of the Chinese people."

== Design ==
According to People's Daily, "The standard party flag is 120 centimeters (cm) in length and 80 cm in width. In the center of the upper-left corner (a quarter of the length and width to the border) is a yellow hammer-and-sickle 30 cm in diameter. The flag sleeve (pole hem) is in white and 6.5 cm in width. The dimension of the pole hem is not included in the measurement of the flag. In total, the flag has five dimensions, the sizes are "no. 1: 288 cm in length and 192 cm in width; no. 2: 240 cm in length and 160 cm in width; no. 3: 192 cm in length and 128 cm in width; no. 4: 144 cm in length and 96 cm in width; no. 5: 96 cm in length and 64 cm in width." According to regulations, if a specific location requires a non-standard Party flag, an approval must be made by the organization department of the CCP committee at the county level or above.

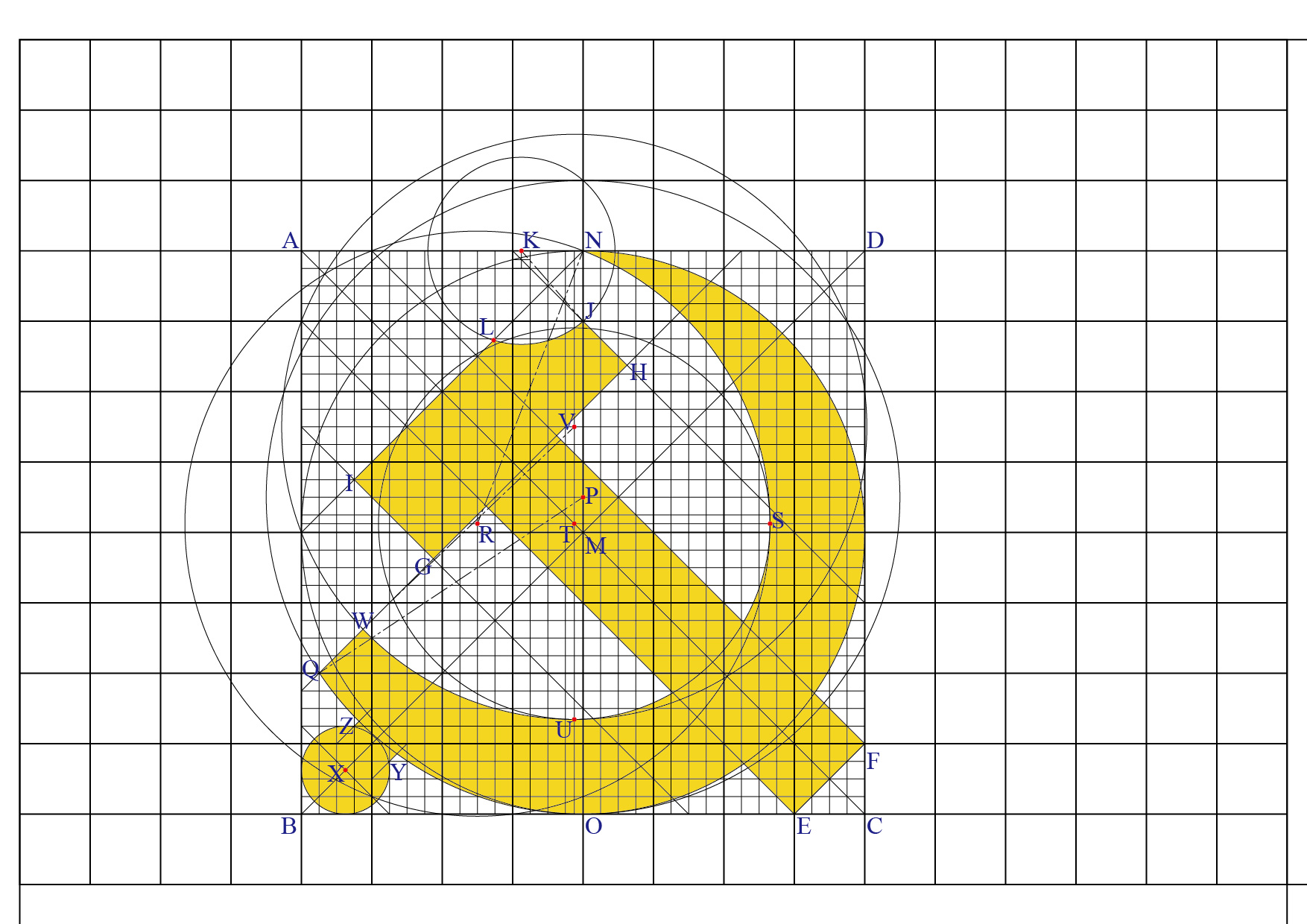
Illustration of the design of the emblem of the Chinese Communist Party (upper left quarter of the Party flag)

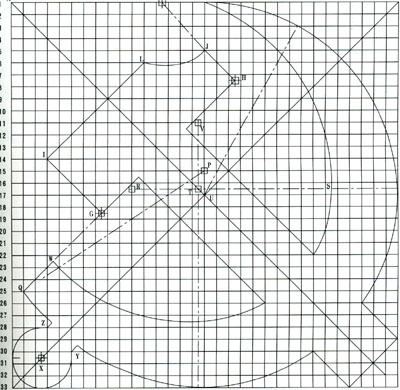
Design of the emblem of the Chinese Communist Party

=== Color ===
Article 5 of the "Regulations on the Emblem and Flag of the Communist Party of China" stipulates the colors of the Party emblem, which are generally golden yellow or red. According to the appendices to the Regulations, namely the Explanation on the Making of the Emblem and Flag of the Communist Party of China, the standard colors of the Party emblem and flag are as follows:

	Red	Yellow	Red	Yellow
RGB	238/28/37	255/255/0	237/44/37	253/207/48
Hexadecimal	#ee1c25ff	#ffff00ff	#ed2c25ff	#fdcf30ff

== Protocol ==
According to Party regulations, the CCP flag is used while convening grassroots CCP congresses and during oath-taking ceremonies for new Party members, during major celebrations and commemorative activities within the CCP and Party day activities, at meeting rooms of CCP committees and their working departments, at representative organs dispatched by the CCP Central Committee and local committees and their working departments, and CCP's discipline inspection organs. The regulations add that at places where the national flag of China should be raised according to the National Flag Law, the Party flag is generally not displayed simultaneously. During military parades, the CCP flag takes precedence over the national flag, which itself takes precedence over the PLA flag.

== Gallery ==
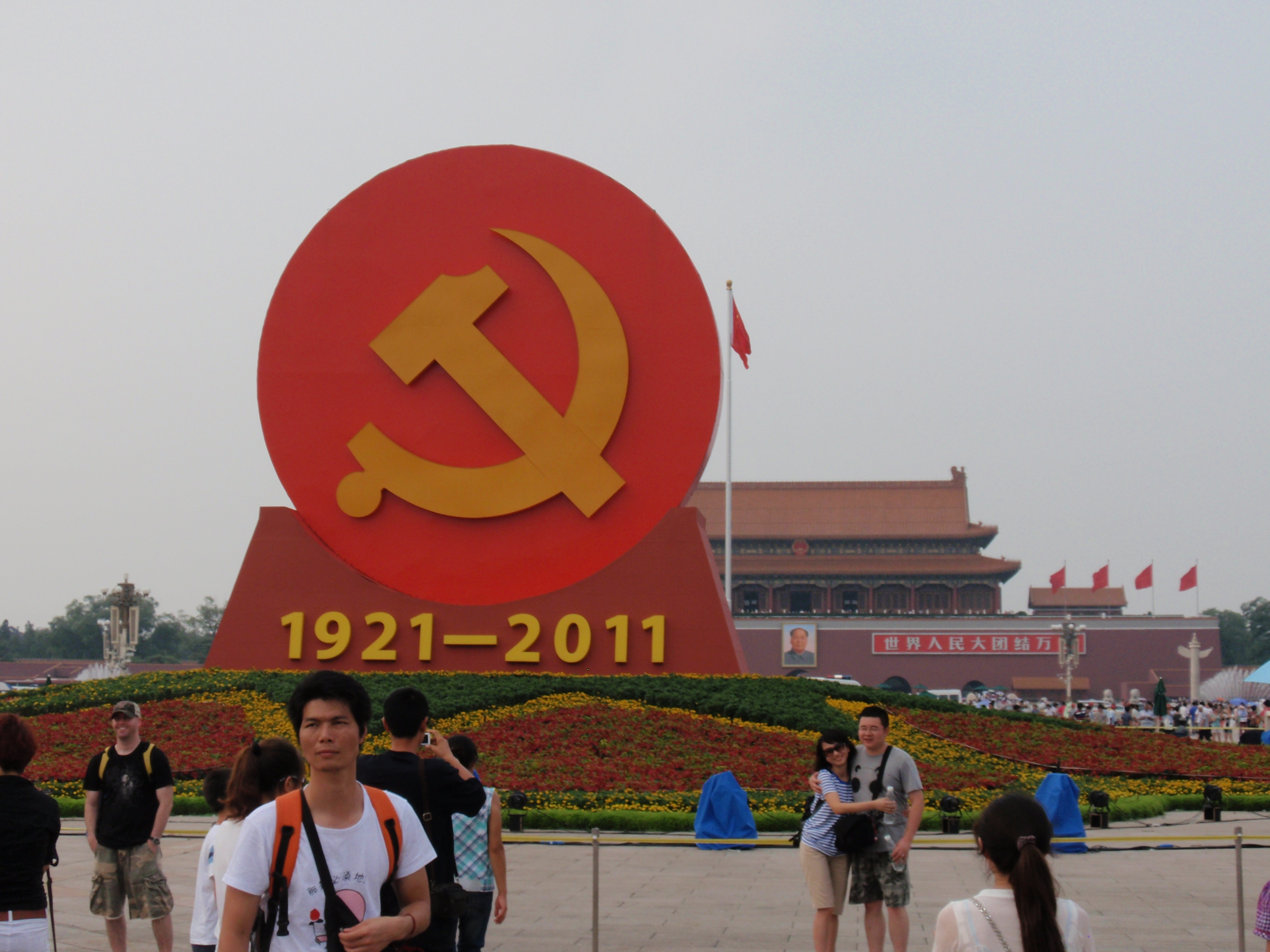
A temporary monument in Tiananmen Square marking the 90th anniversary of the Chinese Communist Party in 2011

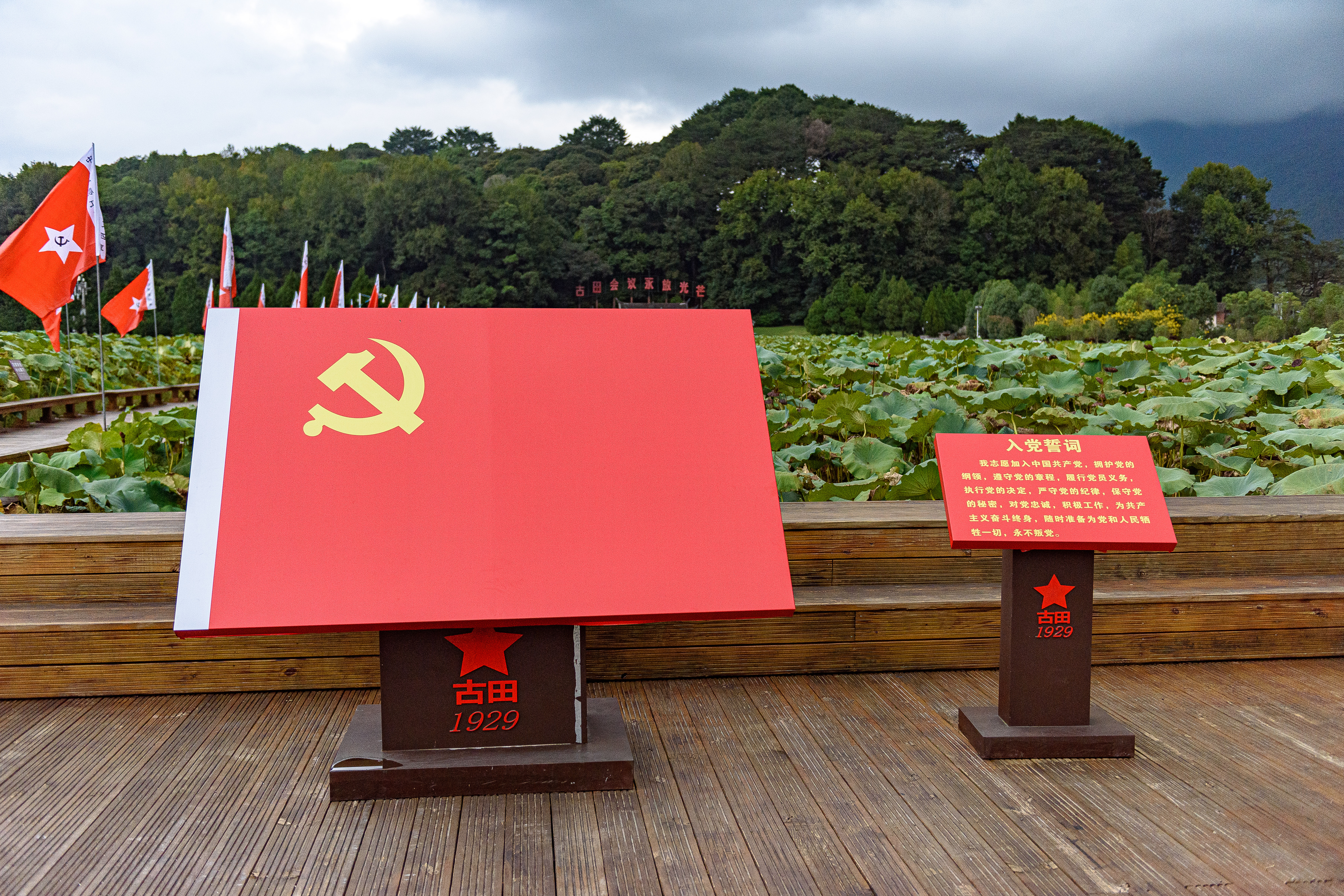
The Party flag at the CCP Admission Oath at the Gutian Congress site in Gutian, Fujian

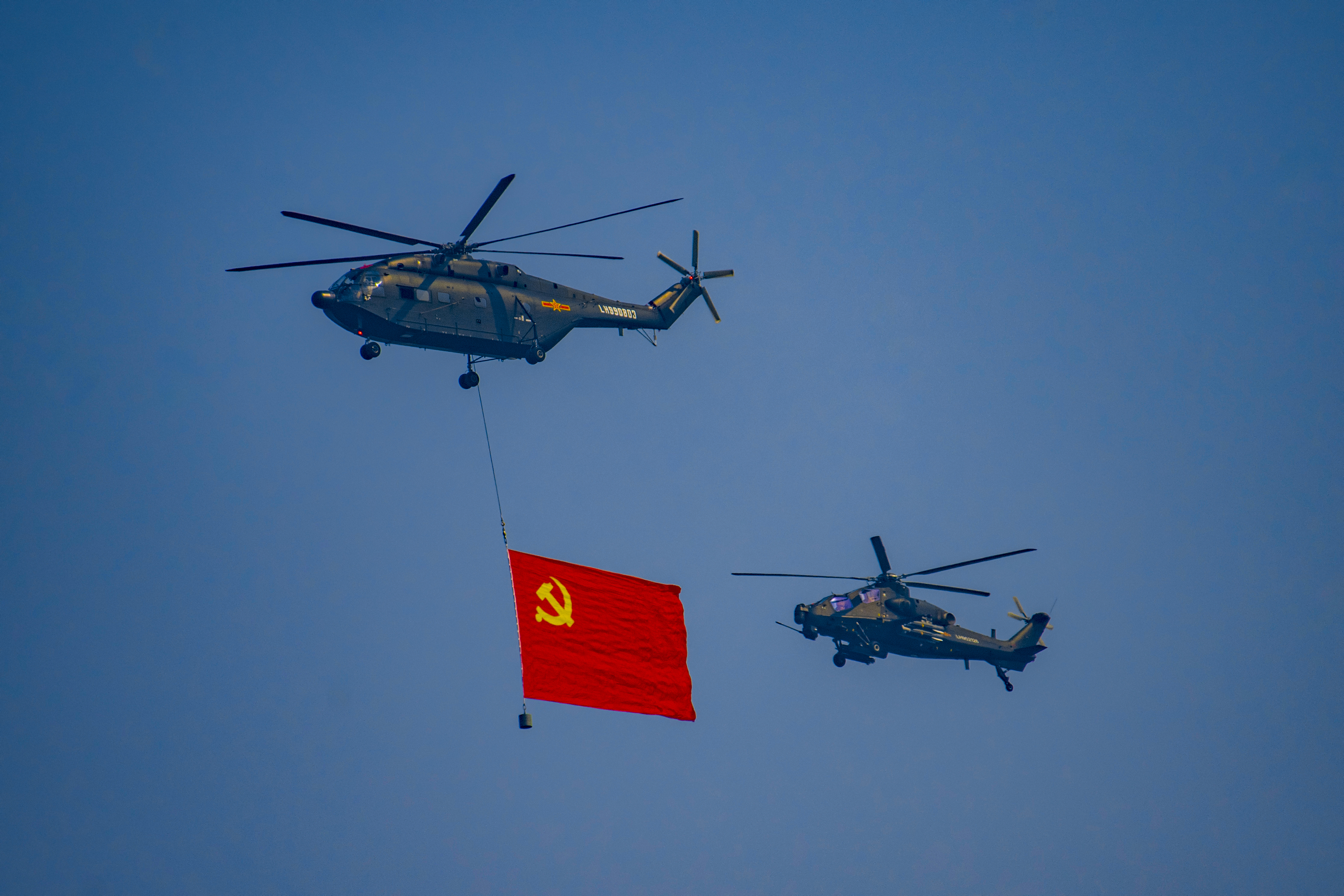
The People's Liberation Army raising the flag of the Chinese Communist Party during a military parade marking the 70th anniversary of the People's Republic of China on 1 October 2019.

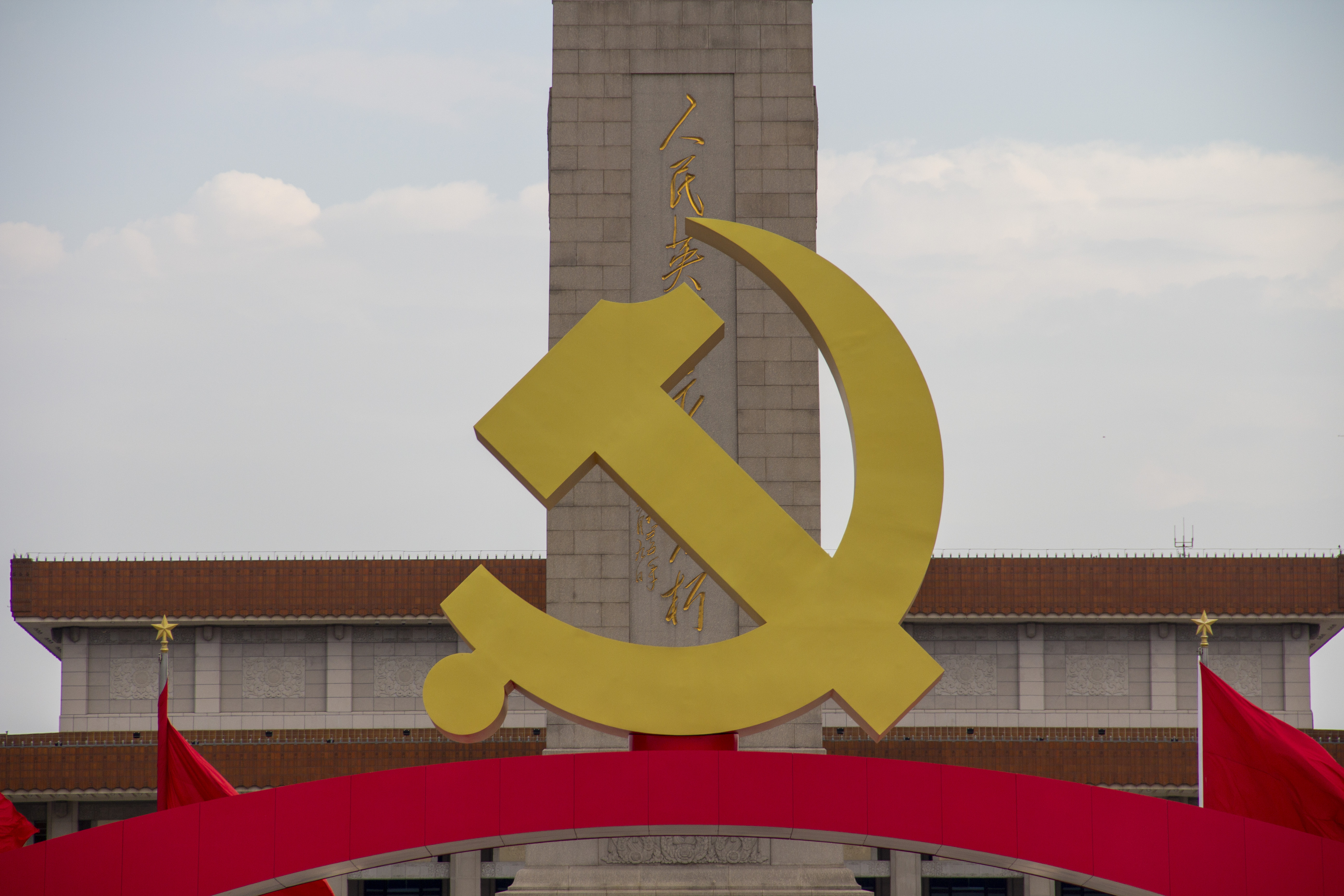
The Party emblem in front of the Monument to the People's Heroes in Tiananmen Square at the 100th anniversary of the Chinese Communist Party in 2021

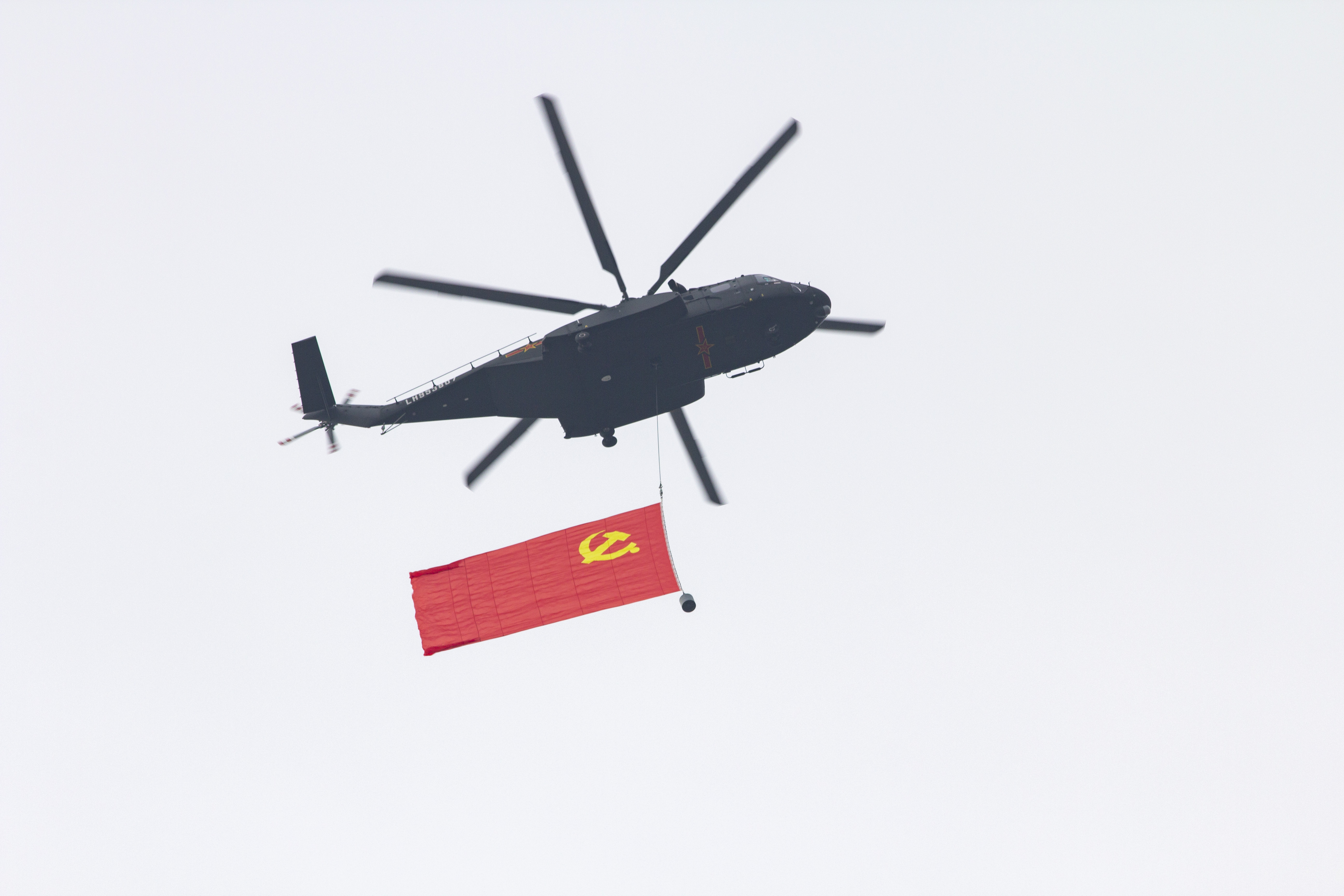
Z-8L carrying the flag flying over Beijing on 1 July 2021 at the 100th anniversary of the Chinese Communist Party.
A common variation of the party emblem before standardization (1942–1996)

A common variation of the party flag before standardization (1942–1996)

A version of the party emblem at the 12th Party National Congress in 1982

Red version of the 1982 emblem

== See also ==
- National emblem of China
- Flag of China
