= Qin Guangrong =

Chinese politician

- 秦光荣
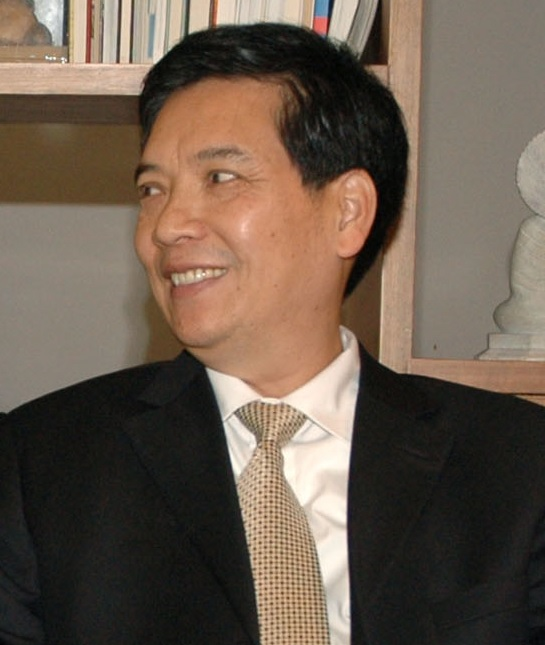
- Qin Guangrong

Vice Chairperson of National People's Congress Supervisory and Judicial Affairs Committee
- In office 12th National People's Congress
- In office November 2014 – March 2018
- Chairperson: Ma Wen

Party Secretary of Yunnan
- In office August 2011 – October 2014
- Preceded by: Bai Enpei
- Succeeded by: Li Jiheng

Chairman of the Standing Committee of the Yunnan People's Congress
- In office 11th Yunnan People's Congress
- In office February 2012 – November 2014
- Preceded by: Bai Enpei
- Succeeded by: Li Jiheng

Governor of Yunnan
- In office July 2007 – August 2011
- Preceded by: Xu Rongkai
- Succeeded by: Li Jiheng

Executive Vice Governor of Yunnan
- In office January 2003 – July 2007
- Preceded by: Niu Shaoyao
- Succeeded by: Luo Zhengfu

Head of Organization Department of Yunnan Provincial Committee of the Chinese Communist Party
- In office March 2001 – February 2003
- Preceded by: Meng Jiyao
- Succeeded by: Li Jiang

Secretary of the Political Law Committee of the Yunnan Provincial Committee of the Chinese Communist Party
- In office January 1999 – March 2001
- Preceded by: Jiang Xingchang
- Succeeded by: Li Mingzhao

Party Secretary of Changsha
- In office June 1993 – February 1998
- Preceded by: Xia Zanzhong
- Succeeded by: Yang Baohua

Personal details
- Born: 25 December 1950 (age 75) Yongzhou, Hunan
- Party: Chinese Communist Party (1972-2019, expelled)
- Spouse: Huang Yulan
- Children: 1
- Education: Hengyang Normal University

Chinese name
- Traditional Chinese: 秦光榮
- Simplified Chinese: 秦光荣
Transcriptions
Standard Mandarin
- Hanyu Pinyin: Qín Guāngróng

Qin Guangrong (Chinese: 秦光荣; pinyin: Qín Guāngróng; born 25 December 1950) is a Chinese former politician. He served as the Governor of Yunnan from 2007 to 2011, when he became the Party Secretary of Yunnan, Yunnan's top political office, until October 2014. He last served as deputy chair of the committee on internal legal affairs of the National People's Congress, from 2014 to 2018. He is the first leader of provincial level to spontaneously hand himself in to the anti-corruption agency of China.

His son, Qin Ling, was a former chairman of Huarong Investment Stock Corp and came under investigation as part of the corruption scandal at the Huarong Asset Management Co. Ltd., one of China's four state-run bad-asset disposal companies.

== Early life and education ==
Qin was born in Yongzhou, Hunan on 25 December 1950. He attended Hengyang Normal University, majoring in Chinese language.

== Career ==
After graduating, he was dispatched to the Lingling campus of Hunan Normal University. He then entered the Communist Youth League system as a provincial functionary, eventually working his way up to leading positions. In June 1993, he became party chief of Changsha at the age of 38; a year later he joined the provincial party standing committee.

In January 1999, he was transferred to the southwestern province of Yunnan to become the provincial Political and Legal Affairs secretary, then cycled through the offices of organization department head, executive vice governor, and Deputy Party Secretary. He was first appointed the governor of Yunnan in January 2007. He was re-elected as Governor by the Yunnan Provincial People's Congress on 24 January 2008.

Qin was named the Party Secretary for Yunnan in November 2011.

In mid September 2013, Qin led a delegation of more than 200 people to visit Taiwan. While in Taiwan, Qin met with the former chairman of Kuomintang, Wu Po-hsiung. During the meeting, Qin encouraged Taiwanese businessmen to invest in Yunnan and make use of the province as the gateway to Southeast Asia and South Asia, creating business opportunities. He added that Yunnan welcomes Taiwanese farmers, township wardens, teachers, students, media and religious and business representatives.

== Aftermath of Yunnan corruption cases ==
In 2014, a large number of corruption investigations were opened in Yunnan province, involving former provincial party chief Bai Enpei, former provincial governor Shen Peiping, and former Kunming executive vice mayor Li Xi. Zhang Tianxin, the former party chief of the provincial capital, Kunming, was also demoted as a result of a party investigation. As part of the overall efforts to get to the bottom of corruption cases in the province, Qin Guangrong was asked to step down as party chief in October 2014. Before he left his post he was said to have told his subordinates, "I am going to go somewhere else to work now. Thank you for everything." Subsequently, Qin was named Vice Chair of the internal legal affairs committee of the National People's Congress.

Qin was an alternate member of the 15th and 16th Central Committees of the Chinese Communist Party, and a full member of the 17th, and 18th Central Committees.

== Downfall ==
On 6 April 2019, Qin turned himself in to the government, which was later publicly announced on 9 May. Qin Guangrong was placed under investigation by the Central Commission for Discipline Inspection (CCDI), the party's internal disciplinary body, and the National Supervisory Commission, the highest anti-corruption agency of China. His predecessor, Bai Enpei, was put under investigation in August 2014 and given a suspended death sentence in October 2016. Qiu He, one of Qin's deputies, was being investigated in March 2015 and was sentenced for 14 years and 6 months in prison for accepting bribes of more than 24 million yuan (about 3.7 million U.S. dollars).

On 26 September 2019, Qin had been expelled from the Chinese Communist Party. Qin's case was handed over to the Procuratorate of Chengdu on in November 2019 and went on trial in the Chengdu Municipal Intermediate People's Court on 10 September 2019.

On 10 September 2020, Qin stood trial at the Chengdu Municipal People's Court on charges of taking bribes. The public prosecutors accused him of taking advantage of his former positions in Yunnan to seek profits for various companies and individuals in project contracting, equity transfer and job promotions between 2003 and 2014. In return, he accepted money and gifts worth more than 23.89 million yuan (over 3.49 million U.S. dollars) personally or through his family members.

On 19 January 2021, he was sentenced to seven years in prison for bribery and was also fined 1.5 million yuan (~$231,000) by the Chengdu Municipal Intermediate People's Court. The court said that he was given a reduced sentence for turning himself in and returning the money he took.

== Personal life ==
Qin married Huang Yulan (黄玉兰). Their son, Qin Ling (秦岭), was former president of Huarong Investment Stock Corp. Qin Ling was one of the seven executives present of companies linked to the former Huarong boss Lai Xiaomin.

Party political offices
Preceded by Xia Zanzhong	Party Secretary of Changsha; 1993-1998	Succeeded by Yang Baohua
Preceded by Jiang Xingchang	Secretary of the Political Law Committee of the Yunnan Provincial Committee of the Chinese Communist Party; 1999-2001	Succeeded by Li Mingzhao
Preceded by Meng Jiyao	Head of Organization Department of Yunnan Provincial Committee of the Chinese Communist Party; 2001-2003	Succeeded by Li Jiang
Preceded by Bai Enpei	Party Secretary of Yunnan; 2011–2014	Succeeded by Li Jiheng
Government offices
Preceded by Niu Shaoyao	Executive Vice Governor of Yunnan; 2003-2007	Succeeded by Luo Zhengfu
Preceded by Xu Rongkai	Governor of Yunnan; 2007–2011	Succeeded by Li Jiheng
Assembly seats
Preceded by Bai Enpei	Chairman of the Standing Committee of the Yunnan People's Congress; 2012-2015	Succeeded by Li Jiheng
