= Yang Chonghui =

Chinese politician

Yang Chonghui (Chinese: 杨崇汇; born August, 1945) is a politician of the People's Republic of China. He served as the vice secretary-general of 11th Chinese People's Political Consultative Conference (CPPCC).

== Biography ==
Born in Yanting, Sichuan Province, Yang joined the Chinese Communist Party (CCP) in March 1966. From 1965 to 1970, he studied at Chongqing Medical College, and he continued to serve in the college for years after graduation. In 1978, Yang was elevated to vice secretary of Communist Youth League Chongqing municipal committee. In 1982, he became the vice secretary and later, secretary of CYL Sichuan committee, and a standing committee member of CYL Central Committee. In 1984, Yang was appointed as vice secretary and later, secretary of CCP Ya'an committee. In 1987, he became the vice secretary of commission for discipline inspection of Sichuan. In 1990, Yang was elevated to a standing committee member of CCP Sichuan committee, the secretary of commission for discipline inspection of Sichuan, and a member of Central Commission for Discipline Inspection of the CCP. From 1994, Yang served as vice governor and vice Party chief of Sichuan. In December 1998, he was trained in CCP Central Party School. In December 2001, Yang was transferred to Yunnan and was elected a standing committee member and vice secretary of CCP Yunnan committee. On January 28, 2002, Yang was elected chairman of Yunnan CPPCC. From March 2008, Yang has served as vice secretary-general of 11th CPPCC.

Yang is a current member of 17th Central Committee of the Chinese Communist Party, and a standing committee member of 11th CPPCC.
