= He Zhiqiang =

Chinese politician

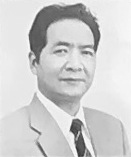

Governor of Yunnan
- In office 1985–1998

Personal details
- Party: Chinese Communist Party

He Zhiqiang (Chinese: 和志强) (1934–2007) was a People's Republic of China politician. Born in Lijiang County, Yunnan Province. He was a member of the Nakhi people. A 1956 graduate of Chongqing University, he was governor of his home province from August 1985 to January 1998.

Preceded by Pu Chaozhu	Governor of Yunnan; 1985–1998	Succeeded by Li Jiating
