= Zhang Delin =

Chinese politician (born 1939)

- 张德邻

Party Secretary of Chongqing
- In office October 1995 – June 1999
- Mayor: Liu Zhizhong; Pu Haiqing
- Preceded by: Sun Tongchuan
- Succeeded by: He Guoqiang

Personal details
- Born: August 1939 (age 87) Beijing, China
- Party: Chinese Communist Party
- Education: Tsinghua University

Chinese name
- Simplified Chinese: 张德邻
- Traditional Chinese: 張德邻
Transcriptions
Standard Mandarin
- Hanyu Pinyin: Zhāng Délín

Zhang Delin (Chinese: 张德邻; born August 1939) is a Chinese politician who served as party secretary of Chongqing from 1995 to 1999. He was a member of the 15th and 16th Central Committee of the Chinese Communist Party. He was a member of the Standing Committee of the 10th Chinese People's Political Consultative Conference.

== Biography ==
Zhang was born in Beijing in August 1939. He joined the Chinese Communist Party (CCP) in June 1964. In 1958, he entered Tsinghua University, majoring in the Mechanical Department. After University in 1964, he taught at Beijing Institute of Machinery.

In 1965, he joined the faculty of Gansu University of Technology (now Lanzhou University of Technology). He moved up the ranks to become vice president in October 1980 and president in June 1983.

In October 1985, he became party secretary of Harbin Boiler Plant. He was elevated to executive deputy secretary of Harbin in June 1987, and was chosen as mayor in February 1990.

He was vice minister of machinery and electronics industry in March 1991 and vice minister of machine-building industry in May 1993.

He was appointed party secretary of Chongqing in October 1995 and was admitted to member of the Standing Committee of the CCP Sichuan Provincial Committee, the province's top authority. When Chongqing was upgraded to a direct-controlled municipality in June 1997, his position at provincial-ministerial level.

In June 1999, he was transferred to Beijing and appointed deputy party secretary of the Working Committee of State Organs of the Central Committee of the Chinese Communist Party, a post he kept until February 2005, when he was chosen as vice chairperson of the Proposal Committee of the Chinese People's Political Consultative Conference.

Educational offices
Preceded by Li Zhiqin	President of Gansu University of Technology; 1983–1985	Succeeded by Chen Jianhong
Government offices
Preceded by Gong Benyan	Mayor of Harbin; 1990–1991	Succeeded by Li Jiating
Party political offices
Preceded by Sun Tongchuan	Party Secretary of Chongqing; 1995–1999	Succeeded by He Guoqiang
