= Party Secretary of Yunnan =

Provincial government position in China

Secretary of the Yunnan Provincial Committee of the Chinese Communist Party
- 中国共产党云南省委员会书记
- Emblem of the Chinese Communist Party

- Flag of the Chinese Communist Party
- Incumbent; Mo Gaoyi since 24 October 2026
- Yunnan Provincial Committee of the Chinese Communist Party
- Type: Party Committee Secretary
- Status: Provincial and ministerial-level official
- Member of: Yunnan Provincial Standing Committee
- Nominator: Central Committee
- Appointer: Yunnan Provincial Committee Central Committee
- Inaugural holder: Song Renqiong
- Formation: February 1950
- Deputy: Deputy Secretary; Secretary-General

The secretary of the Yunnan Provincial Committee of the Chinese Communist Party is the leader of the Yunnan Provincial Committee of the Chinese Communist Party (CCP). As the CCP is the sole ruling party of the People's Republic of China (PRC), the secretary is the highest ranking post in Yunnan.

The secretary is officially appointed by the CCP Central Committee based on the recommendation of the CCP Organization Department, which is then approved by the Politburo and its Standing Committee. The secretary can be also appointed by a plenary meeting of the Yunnan Provincial Committee, but the candidate must be the same as the one approved by the central government. The secretary leads the Standing Committee of the Yunnan Provincial Committee, and is usually a member of the CCP Central Committee. The secretary leads the work of the Provincial Committee and its Standing Committee. The secretary is outranks the governor, who is generally the deputy secretary of the committee.

The current secretary is Mo Gaoyi, who took office on 24 October 2026.

== List of party secretaries ==
Image	Name (English)	Name (Chinese)	Term start	Term end	Ref.
	Song Renqiong	宋任穷	February 1950	July 1952	
	Xie Fuzhi	谢富治	July 1952	August 1959	
	Yan Hongyan	阎红彦	August 1959	January 1967	
	Zhou Xing	周兴	June 1970	October 1975	
	Jia Qiyun	贾启允	October 1975	February 1977	
	An Pingsheng	安平生	February 1977	July 1985	
	Pu Zhaozhu	普朝柱	July 1985	June 1995	
	Gao Yan	高严	June 1995	August 1997	
	Linghu An	令狐安	August 1997	October 2001	
	Bai Enpei	白恩培	25 October 2001	25 August 2011	
	Qin Guangrong	秦光荣	25 August 2011	14 October 2014	
	Li Jiheng	李纪恒	14 October 2014	28 August 2016	
	Chen Hao	陈豪	28 August 2016	20 November 2020	
	Ruan Chengfa	阮成发	20 November 2020	19 October 2021	
	Wang Ning	王宁	19 October 2021	24 October 2026	
	Mo Gaoyi	莫高义	24 October 2026	Incumbent	
