= Chen Hao (politician) =

Chinese politician

- 陈豪
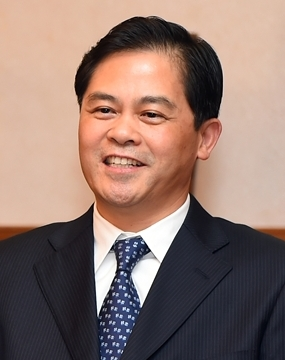
- Chen in 2015

Party Secretary of Yunnan
- In office 28 August 2016 – 20 November 2020
- Deputy: Ruan Chengfa (Governor)
- Preceded by: Li Jiheng
- Succeeded by: Ruan Chengfa

Governor of Yunnan
- In office October 2014 – 13 December 2016 acting until January 2015
- Preceded by: Li Jiheng
- Succeeded by: Ruan Chengfa

Personal details
- Born: 11 February 1954 (age 72) Haimen, Jiangsu, China
- Party: Chinese Communist Party
- Education: East China Normal University; China Europe International Business School

Chen Hao (Chinese: 陈豪; pinyin: Chén Háo; born 11 February 1954) is a Chinese politician. He served as Governor of Yunnan from 2014 to 2016 and also Party Secretary of Yunnan from 2016 to 2020. He was formerly Governor of Yunnan and vice-chairman of the All-China Federation of Trade Unions.

== Career ==
Chen Hao was born in February 1954 in Haimen, Jiangsu province, and worked as a schoolteacher in Haimen from 1973 to 1977. He joined the Chinese Communist Party (CCP) in June 1976.

From 1979 to 1983 he worked at a fruit company in Jing'an District, Shanghai. From 1980 to 1984 he studied at Jiang'an Part-time University, majoring in Chinese literature. Starting in 1983, he worked at the Jiang'an District government, becoming CCP Deputy Committee Secretary of the district in 1996. From 1989 to 1991 he enrolled at the graduate school of East China Normal University, studying economics.

In 1997, he entered the municipal government of Shanghai. In 2003, he obtained an MBA degree from China Europe International Business School. From 2003 to 2010 he served as vice-chairman of the Shanghai Municipal People's Congress, and chairman of the Shanghai General Trade Union. In 2011 he became vice-chairman of the All-China Federation of Trade Unions.

On 17 October 2014, Chen Hao was appointed acting Governor of Yunnan province, succeeding Li Jiheng. He was confirmed as governor in January 2015. In August 2016, Chen was appointed the CCP committee secretary of Yunnan by the Central Committee of the Chinese Communist Party.

In December 2020, Chen was appointed as the Deputy Chairperson of the National People's Congress Ethnic Affairs Committee.

Party political offices
Preceded by Li Jiheng	Party Secretary of Yunnan; 2016 – 2020	Succeeded by Ruan Chengfa
Political offices
Preceded by Li Jiheng	Governor of Yunnan; 2014 – 2016	Succeeded by Ruan Chengfa
