= Guo Yingqiu =

Chinese politician and educator

Guo Yingqiu (Chinese: 郭影秋; 1909–1985) was a Chinese politician and educator.

== Biography ==
Guo Yingqiu was born in Tongshan County, Jiangsu in 1909. He almost faced execution caught up during the campaign to eliminate Trotskyists from the Chinese Communist Party. He was the Governor of Yunnan and the President of Nanjing University and Renmin University.

== Autobiography ==
- 《往事漫忆：郭影秋回忆录》 [Memories of the Past: Memoirs of Guo Yingqiu] (in Chinese). Beijing: China Renmin University Press. 2009-09-01. ISBN 9787300111506.

Government offices
Preceded by Chen Geng	Governor of Yunnan, China; 1953–1957	Succeeded by Yu Yichuan
Educational offices
Preceded by Pan Shu	President of Nanjing University; 1957–1963	Succeeded by Kuang Yaming
Preceded by Cheng Fangwu	President (Honorary) of Renmin University of China; 1983–1985	Succeeded by Yuan Baohua
