= Yunnan Provincial Committee of the Chinese Communist Party =

Yunnan Provincial Committee of the Chinese Communist Party 中国共产党云南省委员会

Overview
- Type: Highest decision-making organ when Yunnan Provincial Congress is not in session.
- Elected by: Yunnan Provincial Congress
- Length of term: Five years
- Term limits: None
- First convocation: February 24, 1950; 76 years ago
- Secretary: Mo Gaoyi
- Deputy Secretary: Liu Qifan; Liu Hongjian
- Secretary-General: Wang Jinjian
- Executive organ: Standing Committee
- Inspection organ: Commission for Discipline Inspection

Yunnan Provincial Committee of the Chinese Communist Party
- Simplified Chinese: 中国共产党云南省委员会
- Traditional Chinese: 中國共產黨雲南省委員會
Transcriptions
Standard Mandarin
- Hanyu Pinyin: Zhōngguó Gòngchǎndǎng Húnánshěng Wěiyuánhuì

Abbreviation
- Simplified Chinese: 中共云南省委
- Traditional Chinese: 中共雲南省委
- Literal meaning: CCP Yunnan Provincial Committee
Transcriptions
Standard Mandarin
- Hanyu Pinyin: Zhōngguó Yúnánshěng Wěi

The Yunnan Provincial Committee of the Chinese Communist Party is the provincial committee of the Chinese Communist Party (CCP) in Yunnan, China, and the province's top authority. The CCP committee secretary is the highest ranking post in the province.

== Organizations ==
The organization of the Yunnan Provincial Committee includes:

- General Office

=== Functional Departments ===
- Organization Department
- Publicity Department
- United Front Work Department
- Political and Legal Affairs Commission
- Social Work Department
- Commission for Discipline Inspection
- Supervisory Commission

=== Offices ===
- Policy Research Office
- Office of the Cyberspace Affairs Commission
- Office of the Foreign Affairs Commission
- Office of the Deepening Reform Commission
- Office of the Institutional Organization Commission
- Office of the Military-civilian Fusion Development Committee
- Taiwan Work Office
- Office of the Leading Group for Inspection Work
- Bureau of Veteran Cadres

=== Dispatched institutions ===
- Working Committee of the Organs Directly Affiliated to the Yunnan Provincial Committee

=== Organizations directly under the Committee ===
- Yunnan Party School
- Yunnan Daily Newspaper Group
- Yunnan Institute of Socialism
- Party History Research Office
- Yunnan Provincial Archives
- Lecturer Group

=== Organization managed by the work organization ===
- Confidential Bureau

== Leadership ==
=== Heads of the Organization Department ===
Name (English)	Name (Chinese)	Tenure begins	Tenure ends	Note
Liu Fei	刘非	November 2023		

=== Heads of the Publicity Department ===
Name (English)	Name (Chinese)	Tenure begins	Tenure ends	Note
Zeng Yan	曾艳	December 2021		

=== Secretaries of the Political and Legal Affairs Commission ===
Name (English)	Name (Chinese)	Tenure begins	Tenure ends	Note
Yang Yalin	杨亚林	December 2021		

=== Heads of the United Front Work Department ===
Name (English)	Name (Chinese)	Tenure begins	Tenure ends	Note
Zhang Zhili	张治礼	April 2024		

== See also ==
- Politics of Yunnan
