= Linghu An =

Chinese politician

- 令狐安

Chairman of the Yunnan Provincial Committee of the Chinese People's Political Consultative Conference
- In office January 1998 – October 2001
- Preceded by: Liu Shusheng
- Succeeded by: Yang Chonghui

Party Secretary of Yunnan
- In office August 1997 – October 2001
- Preceded by: Gao Yan
- Succeeded by: Bai Enpei

Personal details
- Born: October 1946 (age 79–80) Zhaowuda League (now Chifeng), Inner Mongolia, China
- Party: Chinese Communist Party
- Education: Beijing Institute of Technology

Linghu An (Chinese: 令狐安; pinyin: Línghú Ān; born October 1946) is a Chinese politician who served as the party secretary of Yunnan from 1997 to 2001 and chairman of the Yunnan Provincial Committee of the Chinese People's Political Consultative Conference from 1998 to 2001.

He was a representative of the 15th National Congress of the Chinese Communist Party and a member of the 15th Central Committee of the Chinese Communist Party. He was a member of the Standing Committee of the 17th CCP Central Commission for Discipline Inspection. He was a delegate to the 9th National People's Congress and a member of the Standing Committee of the 12th National People's Congress. He was a member of the Standing Committee of the 10th Chinese People's Political Consultative Conference.

== Biography ==
Linghu was born in Zhaowuda League (now Chifeng), Inner Mongolia, in October 1946, while his ancestral home in Pinglu County, Shanxi. In 1965, he entered Beijing Institute of Technology, majoring in infrared ray. After graduating in 1970, he was assigned to Dalian Qianjin Machinery Factory, and worked there until 1977.

He joined the Chinese Communist Party (CCP) in December 1965, and got involved in politics in August 1977, when he was appointed an official in the Dalian Machinery Industry Bureau. After that, he successively served in the Dalian Municipal Committee of the Communist Youth League of China, Dalian Instrument and Electronic Industry Bureau, Dalian Federation of Trade Unions, and Dalian Economic System Reform Commission. He was appointed executive vice mayor of Dalian in July 1985 and was admitted to member of the Standing Committee of the CCP Dalian Municipal Committee, the city's top authority.

In October 1988, he was transferred to Beijing and appointed director of the General Office of the Ministry of Labor, and one year later he was promoted vice minister, concurrently serving as a member of the State Commission for Economic Restructuring.

In September 1993, he became deputy party secretary of Yunnan, rising to party secretary in August 1997. He also served as chairman of the Yunnan Provincial Committee of the Chinese People's Political Consultative Conference between January 1998 and October 2001.

In October 2001, he was chosen as deputy head of the National Audit Office and became a member of the Standing Committee of the Central Commission for Discipline Inspection in October 2007. In March 2013, he took office as vice chairperson of the National People's Congress Overseas Chinese Affairs Committee.

== Works ==
- 情系彩云南 [Loving Colorful Yunnan] (in Chinese). Kunming, Yunnan: Yunnan People's Publishing House. 2005. ISBN 9787222042964.

Party political offices
Preceded by Yin Jun	Secretary of the Political and Legal Committee of the Yunnan Provincial Committee of the Chinese Communist Party; 1993–1995	Succeeded by Jiang Xingchang
Preceded by Gao Yan	Party Secretary of Yunnan; 1997–2001	Succeeded by Bai Enpei
Assembly seats
Preceded by Liu Shusheng	Chairman of the Yunnan Provincial Committee of the Chinese People's Political Consultative Conference; 1998–2001	Succeeded by Yang Chonghui
