= Law of the People's Republic of China on the National Flag =

Standing Committee of the National People's Congress
- Passed by: Standing Committee of the National People's Congress
- Passed: 28 June 1990
- Signed by: President Yang Shangkun
- Signed: 28 June 1990
- Commenced: 1 October 1990
- Introduced by: Council of Chairpersons

Amends
- 2009, 2020
- Status: In force

Law of the People's Republic of China on the National Flag
- Simplified Chinese: 中华人民共和国国旗法
- Traditional Chinese: 中華人民共和國國旗法
Transcriptions
Standard Mandarin
- Hanyu Pinyin: Zhōnghuá Rénmín Gònghéguó Guóqí Fǎ

The Law of the People's Republic of China on the National Flag is a legislation concerning the regulation of the national flag of the People's Republic of China. It was passed by the Standing Committee of the National People's Congress on 28 June 1990 and came into effect on 1 October 1990.

== Legislative history ==
The Draft Law was adopted at the 14th meeting of the Standing Committee of the 7th National People's Congress on June 28, 1990, and was officially promulgated by President Yang Shangkun in the Presidential Order No. 28, and came into effect on October 1, 1990. On August 27, 2009, the Law was revised at the 10th meeting of the Standing Committee of the 11th National People's Congress. The full text consists of 20 articles, with an explanation of the National Flag Law. On October 17, 2020, the 22nd meeting of the Standing Committee of the 13th National People's Congress revised the National Flag Law, and the revised version came into effect on January 1, 2021.

== Provisions ==
The National Flag Law

The main point of the law is to set down regulations on how to make the Chinese flag, what it looks like, where it can be flown and how it can be flown. The law also stresses that the national flag is "the symbol and hallmark of the People's Republic of China" and that everyone "shall respect and care for the National Flag".

The law mentions five possible sizes that could be made for the national flag: According to Article 4 of the Law On the National Flag, people's governments of provinces, autonomous regions and municipalities directly under the Central Government are directed to authorize companies to make any copy of the national flag. Besides five official sizes for flying on flagpoles, there are another four smaller sizes for other purposes, such as decoration on cars or display in meeting rooms.
