= Wang Yubo =

Chinese politician (born 1963)

- 王予波
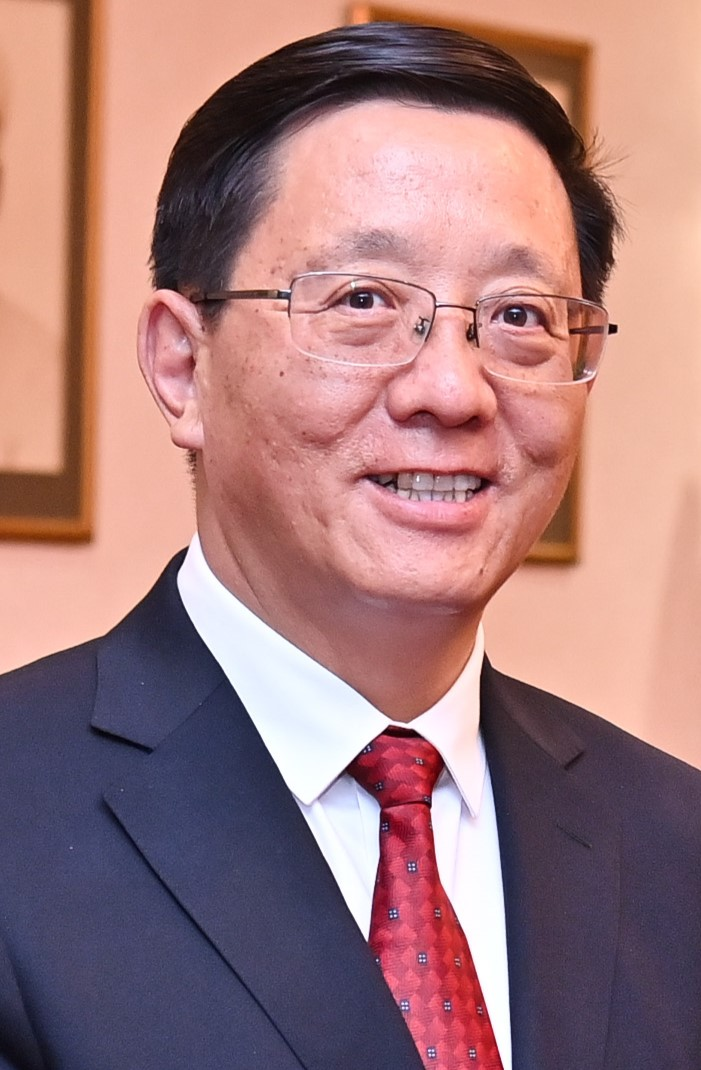
- Wang in 2023

Governor of Yunnan
- In office 25 November 2020 – 2 November 2026
- Preceded by: Ruan Chengfa
- Succeeded by: Liu Qifan (acting)

Personal details
- Born: January 1963 (age 63) Zhenping County, Henan
- Party: Chinese Communist Party
- Education: Qinghai Normal University; Central Party School of the Chinese Communist Party

Wang Yubo (Chinese: 王予波, born January 1963) is a Chinese politician who served as the Governor of Yunnan from November 2020 to November 2026.

== Biography ==
Wang was born in Zhenping County, Henan. he graduated from Qinghai Normal University with a bachelor's degree in 1984, majoring Chinese Language & Literature. In the same year, he joined the Communist Party. He had been served as the Deputy Director-general of the Science and Technology Department of Qinghai Province (2000–2003), Deputy Secretary-general of the Qinghai Government (2003–2008), Director-general of the Education Department of Qinghai (2008–2012), Mayor of Xining (2012–2015), Secretary-general of Chinese Communist Party Provincial Standing Committee of Qinghai (2015–2017), and Deputy Governor of Qinghai (2017–2019).

Wang was appointed as the Chinese Communist Party Deputy Committee Secretary of Yunnan in June 2019. He was named the acting Governor in November 2020. He was elected as the Governor in January 2021.

On 24 October 2026, he ceased to serve as Deputy Secretary of the CCP Yunnan Provincial Committee and Secretary of the Party Group of the Yunnan Provincial Government. On 2 November 2026, he officially resigned from his position as Governor. On 6 November 2026, he was appointed as the vice chairman of the National People's Congress Education, Science, Culture and Health Committee at the 25th meeting of the Standing Committee of the 14th National People's Congress.

Wang is a delegate to the 12th and 13th National People's Congress.
