= Liu Qifan =

Chinese politician

- 刘奇凡

Governor of Yunnan
- Acting
- Assumed office 2 November 2026
- Preceded by: Wang Yubo

Personal details
- Born: April 1967 (age 59) Shuicheng County, Guizhou, China
- Party: Chinese Communist Party (1994-)
- Education: Xiamen University; Nankai University

Liu Qifan (Chinese: 刘奇凡; born April 1967) is a Chinese politician, currently serving as the governor of Yunnan since November 2026. Previously he was served as the deputy secretary of the Qinghai Provincial Committee of the Chinese Communist Party, the secretary of the Liaoning Provincial Commission for Discipline Inspection, and the secretary of the Inner Mongolia Autonomous Regional Commission for Discipline Inspection.

== Career ==
Liu was born in Shuicheng County, Guizhou in April 1967. In 1984, he was enrolled to economy department of Xiamen University and graduated in 1988.

=== Guizhou ===
After graduation in August 1988, Liu was returned to Guizhou, and served as an officer of the Guizhou Provincial Commission for Restructuring the Economic System.

In 1994, Liu was transferred to the office of the Guizhou Provincial People's Government, and transferred to the office of the Guizhou Provincial Committee of the Chinese Communist Party in 2001. In 2006, he was appointed as the deputy secretary-general of the CCP Guizhou Provincial Committee.

In 2012, Liu was appointed as the party secretary of Tongren. He was returned to the CCP Guizhou Provincial Committee and served as the secretary-general in 2015. In 2016, he was appointed as the standing member of the CCP Guizhou Provincial Committee.

=== Inner Mongolia ===
In October 2016, Liu was appointed as the secretary of the Inner Mongolia Autonomous Regional Commission for Discipline Inspection. He was also appointed as the director of the Inner Mongolia Autonomous Regional Supervisory Committee in January 2018.

=== Liaoning ===
In November 2021, Liu was appointed as the secretary of the Liaoning Provoncial Commission for Discipline Inspection.

=== Qinghai ===
In December 2023, Liu was appointed as the deputy secretary of the Qinghai Provincial Committee of the Chinese Communist Party.

=== Yunnan ===
On 24 October 2026, Liu was appointed as the deputy party secretary of Yunnan. On 2 November, he was appointed as the acting governor of Yunnan.

Party political offices
Preceded by Liao Guoxun	Party Secretary of Tongren; 2012–2015	Succeeded by Li Zaiyong
Preceded by Liao Guoxun	Secretary-General of the CCP Guizhou Provincial Committee; 2015–2016	Succeeded by Xia Qingfeng
Preceded by Zhang Li	Secretary of the Inner Mongolia Autonomous Regional Commission for Discipline Inspection; 2016–2021	Succeeded by Liu Shuang
Preceded by Liao Jianyu	Secretary of the Liaoning Provoncial Commission for Discipline Inspection; 2021–	Succeeded by Li Meng
Government offices
Preceded by Wang Yubo	Governor of Yunnan; 2026–	Incumbent
