= Yu Yichuan =

Chinese politician

Yu Yichuan (Chinese: 于一川) (1917–1990), birth name An Jishan (Chinese: 安吉善), was a Chinese politician. He was born in Nanpi County, Hebei Province. He was governor of Yunnan Province.

Preceded by Guo Yingqiu	Governor of Yunnan	Succeeded by Zhou Xing
