= Liu Minghui =

Chinese politician

Liu Minghui (Chinese: 刘明辉) (1914–2010) was a Chinese politician born in Shicheng County, Jiangxi Province. He was governor of Yunnan Province and police chief of Chongqing. He was a delegate to the 3rd National People's Congress.
