= Zhou Xing (politician) =

Chinese politician

Zhou Xing (Chinese: 周兴) (1905–1975) birth name Liu Jiubang (Chinese: 刘旧邦), also known as Liu Weixin (Chinese: 刘维新) was a Chinese politician and a member of Chinese Communist Party born in Yongfeng County, Jiangxi Province during the late Qing era. He was twice governor of Yunnan and Chinese Communist Party Committee Secretary of Yunnan.

Preceded by Yan Hongyan	Party Secretary of Yunnan	Succeeded by Jia Qiyun
Preceded by Yu Yichuan	Governor of Yunnan	Succeeded by Tan Furen
Preceded by Tan Furen	Governor of Yunnan	Succeeded by Jia Qiyun
