= Politics of Jilin =

Lists relating to politics of the Chinese province of Jilin

The politics of Jilin Province in the People's Republic of China is structured in a dual party-government system like all other governing institutions in mainland China.

The Governor of Jilin is the highest-ranking official in the People's Government of Jilin. However, in the province's dual party-government governing system, the Governor has less power than the Jilin Chinese Communist Party (CCP) Provincial Committee Secretary, colloquially termed the "Jilin CCP Party Chief".

== Secretaries of the CCP Jilin Committee ==
| Image | Name (English) | Name (Chinese) | Term start | Term end | Ref. |
|---|---|---|---|---|---|
| | Liu Xiwu | 刘锡五 | October 1949 | April 1952 | |
| | Li Mengling | 李梦龄 | April 1952 | February 1955 | |
| | Wu De | 吴德 | February 1955 | June 1966 | |
| | Zhao Lin | 赵林 | June 1966 | 1968 | |
| | Wang Huaixiang | 王淮湘 | March 1971 | February 1977 | |
| | Wang Enmao | 王恩茂 | February 1977 | October 1981 | |
| | Qiang Xiaochu | 强晓初 | October 1981 | May 1985 | |
| | Gao Di | 高狄 | May 1985 | April 1988 | |
| | He Zhukang | 何竹康 | April 1988 | June 1993 | |
| | Zhang Dejiang | 张徳江 | June 1993 | 16 September 1998 | |
| | Wang Yunkun | 王云坤 | 16 September 1998 | 3 December 2006 | |
| | Wang Min | 王珉 | 3 December 2006 | 30 November 2009 | |
| | Sun Zhengcai | 孙政才 | 30 November 2009 | 18 December 2012 | |
| | Wang Rulin | 王儒林 | 18 December 2012 | 31 August 2014 | |
| | Bayanqolu | 巴音朝鲁 | 31 August 2014 | 20 November 2020 | |
| | Jing Junhai | 景俊海 | 20 November 2020 | 28 June 2024 | |
| | Huang Qiang | 黄强 | 28 June 2024 | Incumbent | |

== Governors of Jilin ==
1. Zhou Chiheng (周持衡): 1950–1952
2. Li Youwen (栗又文): 1952–1967
3. Wang Huaixiang (王淮湘): 1968–1977
4. Wang Enmao (王恩茂): 1977–1980
5. Yu Ke (于克): 1980–1982
6. Zhang Gensheng (张根生): 1982–1983
7. Zhao Xiu (赵修): 1983–1985
8. Gao Dezhan (高德占): 1985–1987
9. He Zhukang (何竹康): 1987–1989
10. Wang Zhongyu (王忠禹): 1989–1992
11. Gao Yan (高严): 1992–1995
12. Wang Yunkun (王云坤): 1995–1998
13. Hong Hu (洪虎): 1998–2004
14. Wang Min (王珉): 2004–2006
15. Han Changfu (韩长赋): 2006–2009
16. Wang Rulin (王儒林): 2009–2012
17. Bayanqolu (巴音朝鲁): 2012–2014
18. Jiang Chaoliang (蒋超良): 2014–2016
19. Liu Guozhong (刘国中): 2016–2018
20. Jing Junhai (景俊海): 2018–2020
21. Han Jun (韩俊): 2020–2023
22. Hu Yuting (胡玉亭): 2023–present

== Chairmen of the Jilin People's Congress ==
1. Li Youwen: 1980–1983
2. Yu Ke: 1983–1985
3. Zhao Xiu: 1985–1988
4. Huo Mingguang: 1988–1993
5. He Zhukang: 1993–1998
6. Zhang Dejiang: January 1998–September 1998
7. Sang Fengwen: September 1998–March 1999
8. Wang Yunkun: 1999–2009
9. Wang Min: 2008–2009
10. Sun Zhengcai: 2009–2012
11. Wang Rulin: 2013–2014
12. Bayanqolu: 2014–2021
13. Jing Junhai (景俊海): 2021–incumbent

== CPPCC Committee Chairmen of Jilin ==
1. Li Diping: 1955–1977
2. Wang Enmao: 1977–1980
3. Li Diping (re-elected): 1980–1985
4. Liu Jingzhi: 1985–1988
5. Liu Yunzhao: 1988–1998
6. Zhang Yueqi: 1998–2003
7. Wang Guofa: 2003–2011
8. Bayanqolu: 2011–2013
9. Huang Yanming: 2013–2018
10. Jiang Zelin: 2018–present
