= Jilin Agricultural University =

Education organization in Changchun, China

- 吉林农业大学
- Motto: 明德崇智，厚朴笃行
- Motto in English: Cultivate Virtue and Wisdom; Act with Integrity and Dedication
- Type: Public university
- Established: 1948; 78 years ago
- President: Li Qiyun (李启云)
- Party Secretary: Zhang Dianfeng (张殿锋)
- Academic staff: 1,838
- Students: 18,000
- Location: Nanguan, Changchun, Jilin, China; 43°48′38″N 125°24′13″E
- Campus: 319.02 hectares; Urban
- Website: www.jlau.edu.cn

University rankings

Global – Overall
- ARWU World: 701-800 (2026)

Main building of JLAU

Jilin Agricultural University (JLAU; Chinese: 吉林农业大学) is a public agricultural university located in Changchun, Jilin Province, China. Founded in 1948, it is affiliated with the Jilin Provincial People's Government and the Ministry of Agriculture and Rural Affairs of China, and included in the National Basic Capacity Construction Project for Western and Central China.

== History ==
Jilin Agricultural University originated from the Agricultural Cadre School (农业干部学院) established in 1948 in Heilongjiang Province under the Northeast Bureau of the Central Committee of the Chinese Communist Party.

In 1958, it was reorganized as Changchun College of Agriculture (长春农学院), and the name of the institution was inscribed by Zhou Enlai, then Premier of the State Council of China. In 1959, it was officially renamed Jilin Agricultural University.

== Administration ==
Jilin Agricultural University has approximately 18,000 students, 20 undergraduate colleges, one directly affiliated teaching department, and one graduate school, as well as nine postdoctoral research stations.

== Major schools and departments ==
Major academic units include:

- College of Agronomy
- College of Plant Protection
- College of Veterinary Medicine
- College of Resources and Environmental Sciences
- College of Economics and Management
- College of Food Science and Engineering
- College of Chinese Medicinal Materials
- College of Horticulture
- College of Forestry and Grassland Sciences
- College of Life Sciences
- College of Engineering and Technology
- College of Information Technology
- College of Foreign Languages
- College of Humanities

== Notable alumni ==
Name	Position
Wu Yixia (Politician)	Former Vice Minister of Agriculture of China
Hui liangyu(Politician)	Former Member of the Political Bureau of the CPC Central Committee
Wang Rulin (Politician)	Former Party Secretary of Shanxi and Jilin, and former Governor of Jilin
Hou Jianmin(Politician)	Former Deputy Director of the CPPCC Economic Committee
Yin Huai(Politician)	Former Member of the Standing Committee of the Jilin Provincial Commission for Discipline Inspection
