= Jilin Provincial People's Government =

Government of Jilin province

Jilin Provincial People's Government 吉林省人民政府
- Established: April 1949; 77 years ago

Leadership
- Governor: Hu Yuting; 3 April 2023
- Parent body: Central People's Government; Jilin Provincial People's Congress
- Elected by: Jilin Provincial People's Congress

Meeting place
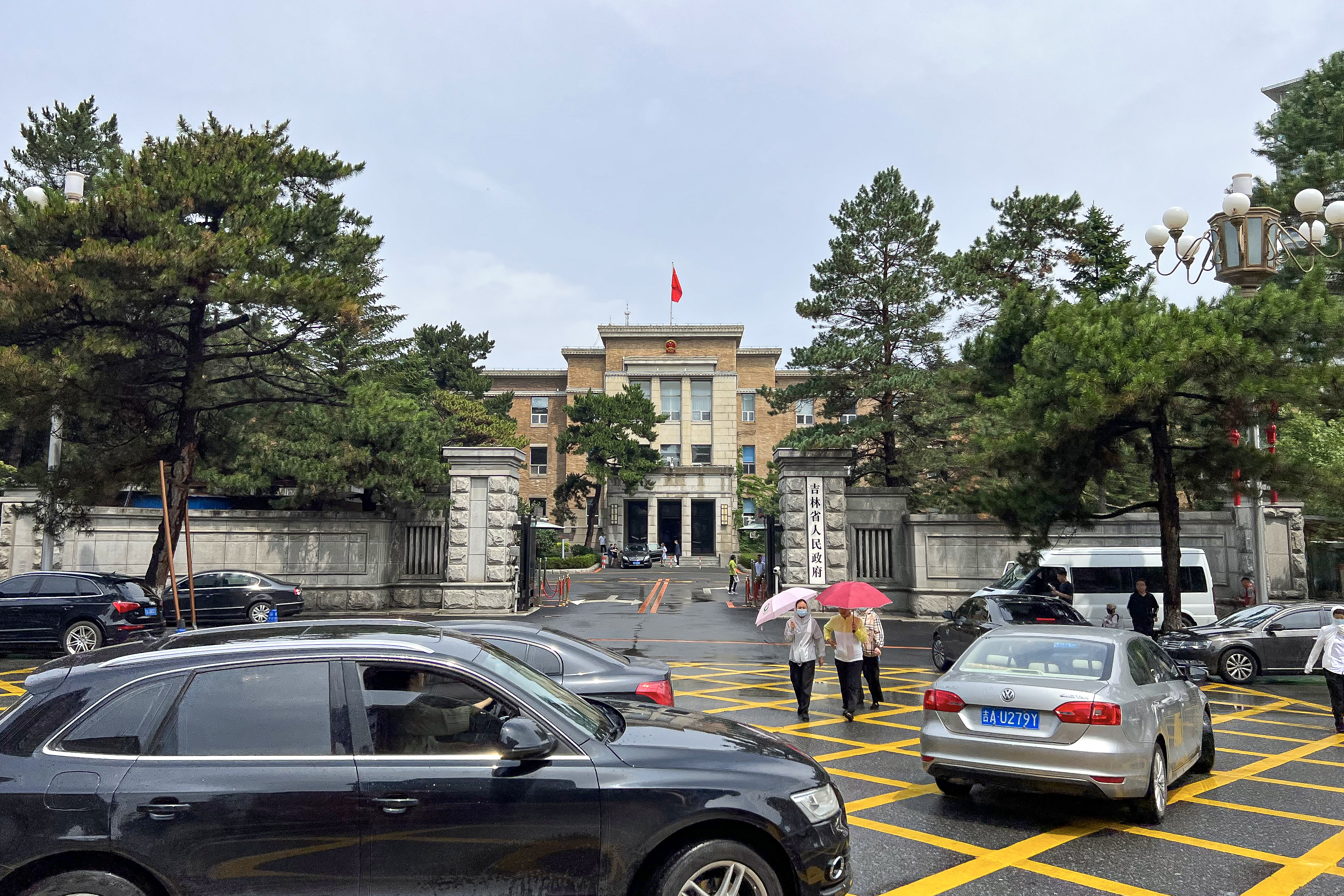
- Headquarters

Website
- www.jl.gov.cn

The Jilin Provincial People's Government is the local administrative agency of Jilin. It is officially elected by the Jilin Provincial People's Congress and is formally responsible to the Jilin Provincial People's Congress and its Standing Committee. Under the country's one-party system, the governor is subordinate to the secretary of the Jilin Provincial Committee of the Chinese Communist Party. The Provincial government is headed by a governor, currently Hu Yuting.

== History ==
The earliest can be traced back to October 25, 1945, when the Northeast Bureau of the CCP Central Committee approved the establishment of the Jilin-Hebei Regional Administrative Committee in Changchun City. On November 10 of the same year, the Northeast Bureau of the CCP Central Committee abolished the party, government and military institutions in the Jilin-Hebei region and established the party, government and military institutions of Jilin Province. In late December, the Jilin Provincial Government was established in Yongji County. In April 1949, the Jilin Provincial Government was renamed the Jilin Provincial People's Government. In February 1955, the Jilin Provincial People's Government was reorganized into the Jilin Provincial People's Committee. In March 1968, the Jilin Provincial Revolutionary Committee was established. In March 1980, the Jilin Provincial Revolutionary Committee was abolished and the Jilin Provincial People's Government was re-established.

In 2005, the People's Government of Jilin Province established the Changbai Mountain Protection and Development Zone Management Committee, a full-department-level organization as a dispatched agency of the Provincial People's Government to manage the Changbai Mountain Protection and Development Zone.

== Organization ==
The organization of the Jilin Provincial People's Government includes:

- General Office of the Jilin Provincial People's Government

=== Component Departments ===
- Jilin Provincial Development and Reform Commission
- Jilin Provincial Department of Education
- Jilin Provincial Department of Science and Technology
- Jilin Provincial Department of Industry and Information Technology
- Jilin Provincial Ethnic Affairs Commission
- Jilin Provincial Public Security Department
- Jilin Provincial Civil Affairs Department
- Jilin Provincial Department of Justice
- Jilin Provincial Department of Finance
- Jilin Provincial Department of Human Resources and Social Security
- Jilin Provincial Department of Natural Resources
- Jilin Provincial Department of Ecology and Environment
- Jilin Provincial Department of Housing and Urban-Rural Development
- Jilin Provincial Department of Transportation
- Jilin Provincial Water Resources Department
- Jilin Provincial Department of Agriculture and Rural Affairs
- Jilin Provincial Department of Commerce
- Jilin Provincial Department of Culture and Tourism
- Jilin Provincial Health Commission
- Jilin Provincial Department of Veterans Affairs
- Jilin Provincial Emergency Management Department
- Jilin Provincial Audit Office
- Foreign Affairs Office of Jilin Provincial People's Government
- Jilin Provincial Market Supervision and Administration Bureau

=== Directly affiliated special institution ===
- State-owned Assets Supervision and Administration Commission of Jilin Provincial People's Government

=== Organizations under the government ===
- Jilin Provincial Radio and Television Bureau
- Jilin Provincial Sports Bureau
- Jilin Provincial Bureau of Statistics
- Jilin Provincial Medical Insurance Bureau
- Jilin Provincial Government Affairs Bureau
- Jilin Provincial People's Government Research Office
- Jilin Provincial Grain and Material Reserve Bureau
- Jilin Provincial National Defense Mobilization Office
- Jilin Provincial Local Financial Administration Bureau
- Jilin Provincial Government Services and Digital Construction Administration
- Jilin Provincial Rural Revitalization Bureau
- Jilin Provincial Forestry and Grassland Bureau

=== Departmental management organization ===
- Jilin Provincial Energy Bureau is managed by the Provincial Development and Reform Commission.
- The Jilin Provincial Prison Administration Bureau is managed by the Provincial Department of Justice.
- Jilin Provincial Animal Husbandry Administration Bureau is managed by the Provincial Department of Agriculture and Rural Affairs.
- The Jilin Provincial Administration of Traditional Chinese Medicine is managed by the Provincial Health Commission.
- The Jilin Provincial Drug Administration is managed by the Provincial Market Supervision Department.

=== Directly affiliated institutions ===
- Jilin Provincial Committee on Aging Affairs Office
- Jilin Nonferrous Metals Geological Exploration Bureau
- Jilin Provincial Supply and Marketing Cooperative
- Jilin Provincial Bureau of Geology and Mineral Exploration and Development
- Jilin Provincial Bureau of Surveying, Mapping and Geographic Information
- Jilin Provincial People's Government Development Research Center
- Jilin Academy of Agricultural Sciences
- Jilin Province Disabled Persons' Federation
- Jilin Radio and Television

=== Dispatched agencies ===
- Changbai Mountain Protection and Development Zone Management Committee
- Changchun New Area Administrative Committee (managed by Changchun Municipal Government)
- China-Korea (Changchun) International Cooperation Demonstration Zone Management Committee
- Jilin Provincial People's Government Office in Beijing
- Jilin Provincial People's Government Office in Shanghai
- Jilin Provincial People's Government Office in Dalian

== See also ==
- Politics of Jilin
  - Jilin Provincial People's Congress
  - Jilin Provincial People's Government
    - Governor of Jilin
  - Jilin Provincial Committee of the Chinese Communist Party
    - Party Secretary of Jilin
  - Jilin Provincial Committee of the Chinese People's Political Consultative Conference
