= Bayanqolu =

Chinese politician (born 1955)

- ᠪᠠᠶᠠᠨᠴᠢᠯᠠᠭᠤ 巴音朝鲁

Party Secretary of Jilin
- In office 31 August 2014 – 20 November 2020
- Deputy: Jing Junhai (Governor)
- Preceded by: Wang Rulin
- Succeeded by: Jing Junhai

Governor of Jilin
- In office 31 January 2013 – 5 September 2014
- Preceded by: Wang Rulin
- Succeeded by: Jiang Chaoliang

Personal details
- Born: 5 October 1955 (age 71) Otog Front Banner, Inner Mongolia, China
- Party: Chinese Communist Party
- Children: 2
- Education: Inner Mongolia Normal University; University of Jinan

Chinese name
- Traditional Chinese: 巴音朝魯
- Simplified Chinese: 巴音朝鲁
Transcriptions
Standard Mandarin
- Hanyu Pinyin: Bāyīncháolǔ

Mongolian name
- Mongolian Cyrillic: Баянчулуун
- Mongolian script: ᠪᠠᠶᠠᠨᠴᠢᠯᠠᠭᠤ

Bayanqolu (Chinese: 巴音朝鲁; pinyin: Bāyīncháolǔ; born 5 October 1955) is a Chinese politician of Mongol ethnicity. He served as the Party Secretary of Jilin from 2014 to 2020 and the Governor of Jilin from 2012 to 2014; Bayanqolu was, at the time of his appointment, the only ethnic-minority official serving as a provincial-level Party Secretary.

Prior to his posts in Jilin province, Bayanqolu was best known for his seven-year term as the Party Secretary of the coastal city of Ningbo, Zhejiang. Bayanqolu was born in Otog Front Banner, Inner Mongolia. He attended Inner Mongolia Normal University and University of Jinan, where he obtained a master's degree in economics. He rose through the ranks of the Communist Youth League in the 1990s before being transferred to work in Zhejiang as vice governor, then as Ningbo party chief.

== Early career ==
=== Inner Mongolia ===
Bayanqolu was born in Otog Front Banner, Inner Mongolia. His name is a combination of the Mongolian word bayan (баян, roughly, "wealth"), and the word qolu (чулуу, "stone"); however he is normally called simply "Bayin" in Mandarin by his friends and colleagues. He began working in 1976 and joined the Chinese Communist Party (CCP) in the same year. His involvement with the CCP began when he was 20 years old. From 1980 to 1982 he attended Inner Mongolia Normal University, studying Political Education. In 1985 he was appointed mayor of Ejin Horo Banner, and was promoted to CCP Committee Secretary of Ejin Horo in 1988.

=== Communist Youth League ===
Bayanqolu became the Deputy Secretary of the Communist Youth League of Inner Mongolia Autonomous Region in 1991, and Secretary in 1992, ascending to a department level (tingjuji) rank at a mere 36 years of age, the youngest official of that rank in Inner Mongolia at the time. In 1993 he was transferred to work for the League's central organization in Beijing, taking the position of Secretary of the Secretariat of the Central Committee of the Communist Youth League (ranked fifth out of six secretaries), and Executive Secretary in 1998. At the Youth League, Bayanqolu worked under the leadership of Li Keqiang and Zhou Qiang. From 1994 to 1997, Bayanqolu enrolled in the postgraduate program at the Economics Management Department of University of Jinan in Shandong province.

== Rising through the ranks ==
=== Zhejiang Province ===
In April 2001, Bayanqolu was transferred to coastal Zhejiang province to become its Vice Governor. In December 2003, he was appointed Party Secretary of Ningbo, a city with sub-provincial administrative status in Zhejiang, putting him at the rank of a provincial-ministerial official. He remained as top leader of Ningbo until 2010. During his stint in Ningbo Bayanqolu also held a seat on the provincial Party Standing Committee, and worked directly with then Zhejiang Party Secretary Xi Jinping. While serving in Ningbo, Bayanqolu's family reportedly continued to live in Beijing. Bayanqolu was said to have lived by himself in a residence converted from a former elementary school, with the mayor of Ningbo and other local politicians being his "flatmates".

During his tenure in Ningbo, the overall operating volume of the Port of Ningbo grew to be higher than that of the neighbouring sister Port of Shanghai; the average economic growth rates at the time was 16.78% annually, with Ningbo ascending to become one of the most economically competitive cities in mainland China. In spite of his "ethnic" background, Bayanqolu, known locally as "Bayin Secretary", frequently bantered with local journalists, sometimes using words in the local dialect.

=== Jilin Province ===
In August 2010, Bayanqolu was transferred to Jilin province in Northeastern China, where he served as CCP Deputy Committee Secretary of the province and Chairman of the Jilin Political Consultative Conference. At the time of his Consultative Conference appointment, some commentators suggested that his political career was coming to a close, since the position was often seen as a "retirement home" for esteemed older politicians; however, in some cases (see He Lifeng, Wang Anshun, Chen Qiufa), the position had served as a "staging ground" for higher office.

In December 2012, Bayanqolu was appointed acting Governor of Jilin, succeeding Wang Rulin, who was promoted to party chief of the province. He was officially confirmed as Governor by the Jilin Provincial Congress in January 2013. Bayanqolu's ascension to governor was notable and was the subject of much fanfare, as he was extremely unusual in being from the Youth League, Zhejiang, and ethnic minority background in a provincial leadership position.

In August 2014, Bayanqolu rose one step further. When Jilin party chief Wang Rulin was parachuted to Shanxi to oversee 'reconstruction' following a massive province-wide anti-corruption crackdown, Bayanqolu was given to nod to replace Wang as Jilin party chief. At the time Bayanqolu assumed office as party chief of Jilin, he became the only ethnic-minority party chief of a Chinese province. He also carried with him the unique resume of having served as party chief, governor, People's Congress chair, and Consultative Conference Chair all within a period of less than five years. Additionally, given his Zhejiang experience, Bayanqolu was generally considered to be an associate of Xi Jinping (see New Zhijiang Army), and was expected to take on even higher office.

In December 2020, Banyanqolu was appointed as the Deputy Chairperson of the National People's Congress Environment Protection and Resources Conservation Committee.

Bayanqolu was an alternate of the 17th Central Committee of the Chinese Communist Party. He is a full member of the 18th and 19th Central Committees.

Party political offices
Preceded by Wang Rulin	Party Secretary of Jilin; 2014–2020	Succeeded by Jing Junhai
Preceded by Wang Rulin	Deputy Party Secretary of Jilin; 2010–2012	Succeeded by Zhu Yanfeng
Preceded by Huang Xingguo	Party Secretary of Ningbo; 2003–2010	Succeeded by Wang Huizhong
Political offices
Preceded by Wang Rulin	Governor of Jilin; 2012–2014	Succeeded by Jiang Chaoliang
