= Wang Guofa =

Wang Guofa may refer to:

- Wang Guofa (politician)
- Wang Guofa (engineer)
