= Ma Junqing =

Chinese politician

- 马俊清

Deputy Communist Party Secretary of Jilin
- In office November 2015 – February 2017
- Deputy: Zhu Yanfeng
- Preceded by: Gao Guangbin

Vice-Governor of Jilin
- In office May 2012 – December 2015
- Preceded by: Zhu Yanfeng
- Succeeded by: Gao Guangbin

Personal details
- Born: October 1956 (age 69–70) Gongzhuling, Jilin, China
- Party: Chinese Communist Party
- Education: Jilin University

Ma Junqing (Chinese: 马俊清; born October 1956) is a Chinese politician from Jilin province, currently Vice-Chairman of the Jilin Provincial People's Congress. He was the vice governor, then Deputy Communist Party Secretary of Jilin province.

Ma was born in Gongzhuling, Jilin. He joined the Communist Party in March 1976, shortly before the death of Mao. He graduated from the department of economics at Jilin University, and later obtained a doctorate in economics.

Ma's political career originated in the Jilin provincial organization of the Communist Youth League, in which he served as deputy secretary, and secretary, before being transferred to serve as mayor of Songyuan. He later served as party chief of Siping, and the secretary-general of the Jilin government. He joined the Jilin provincial Party Standing Committee as head of the Publicity Department in 2004; later he took on the office of the secretary-general of the Jilin provincial party committee, and in August 2008, was re-shuffled to Vice-Governor. In May 2012 he was named executive vice-governor of Jilin.

In November 2015, he was named deputy party chief of Jilin province. He left the post in 2017 upon reaching retirement age. He retired in January, 2018.

Party political offices
| Preceded by Zhu Yanfeng | Deputy Communist Party Secretary of Jilin; 2015–2017 | Succeeded by Gao Guangbin |
