= Hong Hu =

Hong Hu may refer to:

- Hong Lake or Hong Hu, a freshwater lake in Jingzhou, Hubei, China
- Hong Hu (politician), Chinese politician
