= Jilin Provincial Committee of the Chinese People's Political Consultative Conference =

Jilin Provincial Committee of the Chinese People's Political Consultative Conference 中国人民政治协商会议吉林省委员会
- 13th
- Emblem of the Chinese People's Political Consultative Conference

Type
- Type: United front organ Constitutional convention (Historical); Legislature (Historical) of Chinese People's Political Consultative Conference

History
- Founded: February 1955; 71 years ago
- Preceded by: Jilin Provincial People's Congress Consultative Committee

Leadership
- Chairperson: Zhu Guoxian

Website
- www.jlzx.gov.cn

Chinese name
- Simplified Chinese: 中国人民政治协商会议吉林省委员会
- Traditional Chinese: 中國人民政治協商會議吉林省委員會
Transcriptions
Standard Mandarin
- Hanyu Pinyin: Zhōngguó Rénmín Zhèngzhì Xiéshāng Huìyì Jílínshěng Wěiyuánhuì

Abbreviation
- Simplified Chinese: 吉林省政协
- Traditional Chinese: 吉林省政協
- Literal meaning: CPPCC Jilin Provincial Committee
Transcriptions
Standard Mandarin
- Hanyu Pinyin: Jílínshěng Zhèngxié

The Jilin Provincial Committee of the Chinese People's Political Consultative Conference (Chinese: 中国人民政治协商会议吉林省委员会; abbreviation CPPCC Jilin Provincial Committee) is the provincial advisory body and a local organization of the Chinese People's Political Consultative Conference in Jilin, China. It is supervised and directed by the Jilin Provincial Committee of the Chinese Communist Party.

== Term ==
=== 1st ===
- Term: February 1955–June 1959
- Chairperson: Li Diping
- Vice Chairpersons: Xu Shouxuan, Guan Junyan, Zhang Dexin, Song Renyuan, Cheng Shengsan

=== 2nd ===
- Term: June 1959–December 1963
- Chairperson: Li Diping
- Vice Chairpersons: Xu Shouxuan, Guan Junyan, Wu Xuezhou, Zhang Dexin, Song Renyuan, Cheng Shengsan, Cui Cai, Liu Fengzhu

=== 3rd ===
- Term: December 1963–December 1977
- Chairperson: Li Diping
- Vice Chairpersons: Xu Shouxuan, Guan Junyan, Wu Xuezhou, Zhang Dexin, Song Renyuan, Cheng Shengsan, Cui Cai, Liu Fengzhu, Xiao Danfeng (September 1964–), Gao Feng (September 1965–)

=== 4th ===
- Term: December 1977–April 1983
- Chairperson: Wang Enmao (–April 1980) → Li Diping (April 1980–)
- Vice Chairpersons: Yu Ke (–April 1980), Xu Shouxuan (–April 1980), Li Mengling (–April 1980), Wang Daheng, Fu Zhensheng, Wu Xuezhou (–April 1980), Li Youwen (–April 1980), Yu Yifu, Song Renyuan, Zhang Dexin, Zhang Wenhai (died 1978), Zhang Kaijing (–April 1980), Mao Cheng (–April 1980), Cheng Shengsan (–April 1980), Cui Cai, Liu Fengzhu, Xiao Danfeng, Wu Jiaxiang (April 1980–), Zhong Mingbiao (April 1980–), Che Minqiao (April 1980–), Yan Zitao (April 1980–), Guan Mengjue (April 1980–), Tao Weisun (April 1980–), Cui Cifeng (April 1980–), Qian Zhian (April 1980–), Miao Zhuxian (April 1980–), Yang Rubai (April 1980–)

=== 5th ===
- Term: April 1983–January 1988
- Chairperson: Li Diping → Liu Jingzhi (May 1985–)
- Vice Chairpersons: Zhang Fengqi, Che Minqiao, Zhang Dexin, Guan Mengjue, Miao Zhuxian, He Yunqing, Geng Yuelun, Luo Yuejia, Xin Cheng, Jin Minghan, Cai Qiyun, Lu Shiqian (April 1984–)

=== 6th ===
- Term: January 1988–January 1993
- Chairperson: Liu Yunzhao
- Vice Chairpersons: Feng Ximing, Zhang Dexin, Guan Mengjue, Miao Zhuxian, Geng Yuelun, Luo Yuejia, Jin Minghan, Cai Qiyun, Lu Shiqian, Feng Xirui, Zhang Hongkui (March 1989–), Li Guotai (March 1992–), Yan Hongchen (March 1992–), Fang Jianyu (March 1992–), Zhang Tienan (March 1992–)

=== 7th ===
- Term: January 1993–January 1998
- Chairperson: Liu Yunzhao
- Vice Chairpersons: Fang Jianyu, Zhang Tienan, Hu Houjun, Feng Xirui, Li Guotai, Yan Hongchen, Wu Shiduo, Chen Bingcong, Li Hongchang, Liang Zhiwen (February 1994–), Li Yutang (January 1996–)

=== 8th ===
- Term: January 1998–January 2003
- Chairperson: Zhang Yueqi
- Vice Chairpersons: Liu Xilin, Zhao Jiazhi, Yan Hongchen, Liang Zhiwen, Zheng Longzhe, Chang Wanhai, Tang Gesen, Wu Longzhang, Li Huizhen, Zeng Fanxu

=== 9th ===
- Term: January 2003–January 2008
- Chairperson: Wang Guofa
- Vice Chairpersons: Wei Minxue, Zhao Jiazhi, Yan Hongchen, Chang Wanhai, Wu Longzhang, Li Huizhen, Sun Yaoting, Xiu Fujin, Bie Shengxue, Duan Chenggui

=== 10th ===
- Term: January 2008–January 2013
- Chairperson: Wang Guofa
- Vice Chairpersons: Lin Yanzhi, Bie Shengxue, Xu Xuehai, Chang Xianyu, Ren Fengxia, Xue Kang, Zhao Jiguang, Zhi Jianhua
- Secretary-General: Wang Erzhi

=== 11th ===
- Term: January 2013–January 2018
- Chairperson: Huang Yanming
- Vice Chairpersons: Gang Zhanbiao, Bie Shengxue, Xue Kang, Zhao Jiguang, Zhi Jianhua, Wang Erzhi, Zhang Xiaopo, Liu Lijuan, Zhang Bojun, Jin Zhenji (January 2017–)
- Secretary-General: Bao Wei

=== 12th ===
- Term: January 2018–January 2023
- Chairperson: Jiang Zelin
- Vice Chairpersons: Xue Kang, Zhi Jianhua, Li Longxi, Zhang Bojun (–January 2020), Li Jinxiu (–August 2018), Zhao Xiaojun, Cao Yuguang, Lan Hongliang (January 2019–), Li Weidou (January 2019–), Guo Naishuo (January 2020–), Li Jinghao (January 2021–), Li Yue (January 2022–)
- Secretary-General: Xiao Mowen (–January 2021) → Guo Shufeng (January 2021–January 2022) → Liu Wei (January 2022–)

=== 13th ===
- Term: January 2023–2028
- Chairperson: Zhu Guoxian
- Vice Chairpersons: Han Fuchun, Wu Jingping, Li Longxi, Li Yue, Zhang Zhijun, Cao Yuguang, Li Weidou, Guo Naishuo, Cai Guowei, Qin Haitao
- Secretary-General: Liu Wei (–January 2024) → Zhao Haifeng (January 2024–)
