= Zhao Lin (politician) =

Chinese politician

Party Secretary of Jilin
- In office 1966–1968
- Preceded by: Wu De
- Succeeded by: Wang Huaixiang

Personal details
- Born: 1906 Ji'an, Jiangxi
- Died: 2003 (aged 96–97)
- Party: Chinese Communist Party

Zhao Lin (Chinese: 赵林, 1906–2003), also known as Luo Xianglin (罗祥林), was a Chinese politician. He was born in Beiyuan, Ji'an, Jiangxi. Zhao was the Chinese Communist Party Committee Secretary of Jilin, a member of the Central Advisory Commission and a delegate to the 5th National People's Congress. He was a member of the 61 Renegades.

== Biography ==
Zhao was born Luo Huimin (罗惠民). He reportedly became politically active in 1926 amid the Chinese Civil War, and joined the Communist Youth League (CYL) and the Communist Party in 1927.

In 1927, as part of the White Terror, local KMT forces, under the command of the warlord Zhu Shigui (朱世贵), purged the Ji'an CYL and CCP organisations. Zhao moved to the countryside, operating in Nanchang and Anfu County in the following years. In July 1929, he was named secretary of the Jishui County CYL Committee. In February 1930, he attended the CYL Southwest Jiangxi Congress. He quickly climbed in CYL and, by extension, CCP hierarchies. Between 1930 and 1931, he successively became secretary of the CYL Leagues for Shanghai's Wusong district (May 1930 - leading actions in Yong'an Textile Factory and Tongji University), of Beijing (September/October 1930), and Tangshan (February/March 1931). He was arrested by Kuomintang authorities in May 1931 and imprisoned. He was released in 1936 by recanting his loyalty to the CCP in circumstances that would make him the target of Red Guard and Central Case Examination Group attacks as part of the later 61 Renegades' Clique accusations of treason.

Following his release, and during the Second Sino-Japanese War, he operated at the Taiyuan headquarters of the National Liberation Vanguard (December 1936-May 1937) and as secretary of the Taiyuan Municipal Committee of the CCP (April-October 1937), the provincial CCP committee of Northwest Shanxi (November 1937 - August 1938), and of the CCP Western Shanxi Regional Committee (August 1938 - February 1940). Under the leadership of He Long and Guan Xiangying he contributed to the establishment of a number of revolutionary bases in Northern-western Shanxi as part of the 358th Brigade of the Eighth Route Army. He participated in the Yan'an Rectification Movement.

Following the Second Sino-Japanese War, during the Civil War, in KMT territory, he acted as a member of the Standing Committee of the Jin-Sui (晋绥 - Shanxi-Suiyuan) Sub-Bureau (a merger of the Northwest Shanxi Military and Political Committee and the West Shanxi Political Committee) from August 1942 to August 1945, and later as head of its Urban Work Department (城市工作部部长). From January to September 1949, he was the head of the Chinese New Democratic Youth League in the Jin-Sui Border region. In December 1949, he travelled to Sichuan alongside He Long and Li Jingquan, subsequently taking the position of Second Secretary in the Northern Sichuan Regional Committee (February 1950 - August 1952) and third secretary of the Sichuan Provincial Committee of the CCP. In this capacity he also acted, at different points, as Head of the Northern Sichuan District Party School and as Secretary of the Committee Discipline Inspection Commission among other positions. From 1956 onwards, he returned to the Jilin Provincial Committee, eventually acting as its First Secretary, while serving as the Political Commissar of the Jilin Provincial Military District.

During the Cultural Revolution, Zhao Lin was purged as part of the 61 Renegades - with accusations of treason focusing on their 1936 release and recantation.

Alongside Bo Yibo, An Ziwen, Liu Lantao, Liu Youguang, Zhou Zongying, and others, he would later be among those attending the memorial service for Peng Dehuai and Tao Zhu as victims of the Cultural Revolution in December 1978, shortly after the Third Plenum communiqué.

With most surviving provincial cadres among the 61 being only briefly re-instated at similar levels (e.g. Fu Yutian, Wang De), Zhao Lin is among the rare to have progressed in party-state hierarchy after his rehabilitation. He would later thank "the dear Party which had given [him] a political life for the second time". Within the Shandong Provincial Party Committee he acted as secretary between January 1979 and July 1983 and vice-chairman from July 1979 onwards. Between 1982, following the 12th Party Congress, and until 1985, Zhao Lin served as a member in the Central Advisory Commission. In 1985, he was in the leading group for the Central Guidance Committee for Party Rectification (see Party Rectification Campaign).

Zhao died in May 2003 in Jinan. A number of key figures and high cadres of the CCP paid their respects to his family among which Bo Yibo, Hu Jintao, Jiang Zemin, Weng Jiabao, Qiao Shi, Song Ping, and He Guoqiang and articles commemorating his life were published including in state-affiliated Xinhua.

Preceded by Wu De	Party Secretary of Jilin; 1966–1968	Succeeded by Wang Huaixiang
