= Zhu Yanfeng =

Chinese business executive and politician

Zhu Yanfeng (Chinese: 竺延風; pinyin: Zhú Yánfēng; born March 1961) is a Chinese business executive and politician. He is the president of Dongfeng Motor. Previously he served as the president and chief executive of First Automotive Works (FAW), chairman of the Tianjin Automobile Group, and Chinese Communist Party Deputy Committee Secretary of Jilin province.

== Life and career ==
Zhu was born in Fenghua, Zhejiang Province in March 1961. He is the grandson of renowned meteorologist Chu Coching.

He graduated from the Department of Automation at Zhejiang University in August 1983. In 1982, he joined the Chinese Communist Party.

Between 1997 and 1999, Zhu was the Deputy General Manager of China FAW Group Corporation. Between 1999 and 2002, he was promoted to the position of General Manager. In 2002, Zhu went to Tianjin, became the Chairman of Tianjin Automobile Group until 2006. From 2006 onwards he has been the President of China FAW Group Corporation.

China FAW Group Corporation is the first Chinese automobile producer, before the reform and opening up, it was long-time the biggest automobile producer. Currently it's also one of the biggest car producers in China.

In 2007, Zhu became the executive vice governor of Jilin Province; in January 2008 he was also named to the Jilin provincial Party Standing Committee. He left his post as vice governor in May 2012, then was named Chinese Communist Party Deputy Committee Secretary of Jilin.

In May 2015, he left his position as deputy party chief of Jilin, and was named Chinese Communist Party Committee Secretary and Chairman of Dongfeng Motor.

Zhu is an alternate member of the 16th, 17th, and 18th Central Committees of the Chinese Communist Party.

Party political offices
Preceded by Bayanqolu	Deputy Communist Party Secretary of Jilin; 2012–2015	Succeeded by Ma Junqing
