= Gao Guangbin =

Chinese politician

- 高广滨

Communist Party Secretary of Changchun
- In office May 2007 – December 2015
- Preceded by: Wang Rulin
- Succeeded by: Wang Junzheng

Personal details
- Born: May 1963 (age 63) Harbin, Heilongjiang
- Party: Chinese Communist Party
- Education: Changchun University of Science and Technology
- Profession: Optical instrument engineer

Gao Guangbin (Chinese: 高广滨; born May 1963) is a Chinese politician, the current Chinese Communist Party Deputy Committee Secretary of Jilin province. He was part of the Communist Youth League in his early career.

== Life and career ==
Gao was born in Harbin. He studied optical instrument engineering at Changchun Optical College (later Changchun University of Science and Technology). He began working for the provincial school of the Communist Youth League in Jilin province, then became Secretary (i.e. leader) of the provincial Youth League organization in 1997. He then served as deputy party chief, vice mayor, acting mayor, and finally mayor of Songyuan, before being elevated to party chief of Tonghua in April 2004. In May 2007, at age 43, Gao was named a member of the Jilin provincial Party Standing Committee and party chief of the provincial capital Changchun. He served in the position for some eight years, before being transferred to become Executive Vice Governor of Jilin province, taking on the vacancy left by Ma Junqing. In March 2017, he was named deputy party secretary of Jilin province.

Gao was a delegate to the 17th National Congress of the Chinese Communist Party. He is an alternate member of the 18th and 19th Central Committee of the Chinese Communist Party.

Party political offices
| Preceded by Ma Junqing | Deputy Communist Party Secretary of Jilin; 2017– | Incumbent |
