= UOJ =

UOJ may refer to:

- University of Jaffna, in Jaffna, Sri Lanka
- University of Jinan, in Jinan, China
