= Jilin Military District =

- 中国人民解放军吉林省军区
- Founded: November 10, 1945; 79 years ago
- Country: People's Republic of China
- Allegiance: Chinese Communist Party
- Type: Military district
- Role: Command and control
- Part of: People's Liberation Army
- Headquarters: Changchun, Jilin

Commanders
- Commander: Major general (shaojiang) Xi Shuangzhu
- Political Commisar: Major general (shaojiang) Wang Tianli

Chinese name
- Simplified Chinese: 中国人民解放军吉林省军区
- Traditional Chinese: 中國人民解放軍雲南省軍區
Transcriptions
Standard Mandarin
- Hanyu Pinyin: Zhōngguó Rénmín Jiěfàngjūn Jílínshěng Jūnqū

The Jilin Military District (Chinese: 中国人民解放军吉林省军区; full name People's Liberation Army Jilin Military District or PLA Jilin Military District) is a military district of the National Defense Mobilization Department of the Central Military Commission in China.

== History ==
Jilin Military District was first established on 10 November 1945 by the Northeast People's Autonomous Army. In May 1949, its named was changed to Jilin Military Department of the Northeast Military Region of the People's Liberation Army (中国人民解放军东北军区吉林军事部). In August 1955, its headquarters moved to Changchun, capital of Jilin province. In March 1959, it was officially renamed People's Liberation Army Jilin Military District.

== Leaders ==
=== Commanders ===
Name (English)	Name (Chinese)	Tenure begins	Tenure ends	Note
Huang Sipei	黄思沛	February 1953	September 1954	
He Jian	贺健	March 1955	November 1959	
Luo Kunshan	罗坤山	August 1960	November 1965	
He Youfa	何友发	June 1967	May 1983	
Chen Xingyin	陈兴印	May 1983	June 1990	
Zhou Zaikang	周再康	June 1990	December 1994	
Liu Changfu	刘长富	December 1994	May 1997	
Ge Chengwen	葛成文	May 1997	January 2002	
Yue Huilai	岳惠来	January 2002	December 2009	
Xing Shucheng	邢书成	December 2009	December 2010	
Chen Honghai	陈红海	December 2010	July 2015	
Miao Yufeng	苗雨丰	August 2015	November 2018	
Liu Wei	刘维	November 2018	January 2023	
Xi Shuangzhu	席栓柱	January 2023		

=== Political commissars ===
Name (English)	Name (Chinese)	Tenure begins	Tenure ends	Note
Li Mengling	李梦龄	April 1952	February 1955	
Wu De	吴德	February 1955	June 1966	
Wang Huaixiang	王淮湘	August 1969	February 1977	
Wang Enmao	王恩茂	February 1977	October 1981	
Qiang Xiaochu	强晓初	October 1981	May 1985	
Gao Di	高狄	May 1985	August 1988	
Yu Zonghuan	玉宗焕	August 1988	August 1991	
Shi Zhaoping	施兆平	August 1991	November 1994	
Yan Haipeng	阎海鹏	November 1994	December 1999	
Chu Ping	初平	December 1999	June 2003	
Zhang Fucai	张福才	June 2003	July 2008	
Chang Yue	常跃	July 2008	2013	
Hu Yang	胡杨	June 2013	July 2015	
Shao Zhonghai	邵忠海	July 2015	July 2020	
Wang Tianli	王天力	July 2020		
