= Zhang Dejiang =

Chinese politician (born 1946)

- 张德江
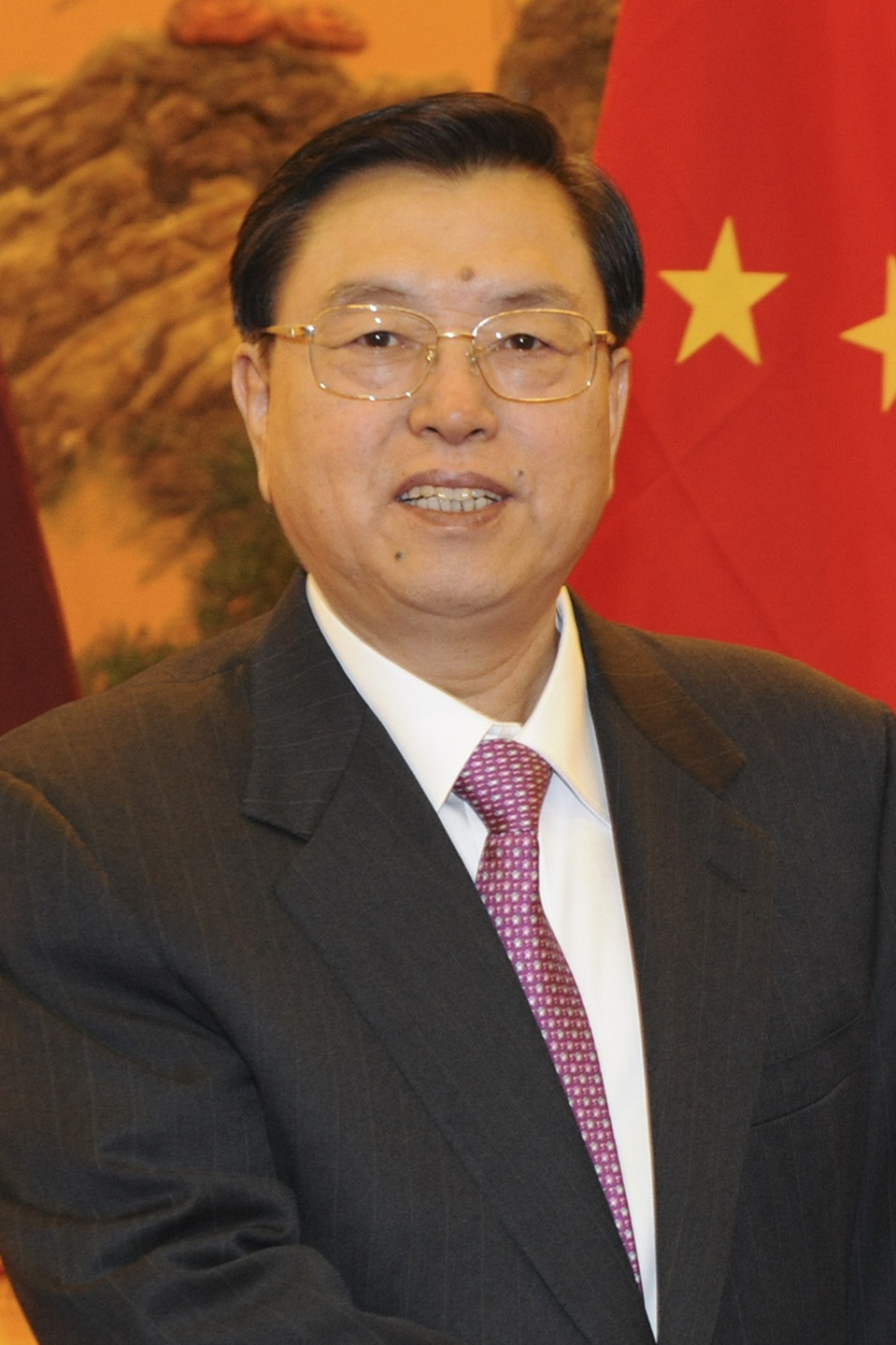
- Zhang in 2014

9th Chairman of the Standing Committee of the National People's Congress
- In office 14 March 2013 – 17 March 2018
- Vice Chairpersons: See list: Li Jianguo; Wang Shengjun; Chen Changzhi; Yan Junqi; Wang Chen; Shen Yueyue; Ji Bingxuan; Zhang Ping; Qiangba Puncog; Arken Imirbaki; Wan Exiang; Zhang Baowen; Chen Zhu
- Secretary-General: Wang Chen
- Preceded by: Wu Bangguo
- Succeeded by: Li Zhanshu

Vice Premier of China
- In office 17 March 2008 – 16 March 2013 Serving with Li Keqiang; Hui Liangyu, Wang Qishan
- Premier: Wen Jiabao

Party Secretary of Chongqing
- In office 15 March 2012 – 20 November 2012
- Deputy: Huang Qifan (Mayor)
- Preceded by: Bo Xilai
- Succeeded by: Sun Zhengcai

Party Secretary of Guangdong
- In office 24 December 2002 – 1 December 2007
- Deputy: Lu Ruihua (Governor); Huang Huahua
- Preceded by: Li Changchun
- Succeeded by: Wang Yang

Party Secretary of Zhejiang
- In office 16 September 1998 – 24 December 2002
- Deputy: Chai Songyue (Governor); Xi Jinping
- Preceded by: Li Zemin
- Succeeded by: Xi Jinping

Party Secretary of Jilin
- In office 6 June 1995 – 16 September 1998
- Deputy: Wang Yunkun (Governor)
- Preceded by: He Zhukang
- Succeeded by: Wang Yunkun

Personal details
- Born: 4 November 1946 (age 79) Tai'an County, Liaoning, Republic of China
- Party: Chinese Communist Party
- Education: Yanbian University; Kim Il Sung University
- Website: www.gov.cn

Zhang Dejiang
- Simplified Chinese: 张德江
- Traditional Chinese: 張德江
Transcriptions
Standard Mandarin
- Hanyu Pinyin: Zhāng Déjiāng
- IPA: [ʈʂáŋ tɤ̌.tɕjáŋ]

Zhang Dejiang (/dʒɑːŋ dəˈdʒjɑːŋ/; born 4 November 1946) is a Chinese retired politician who served as the chairman of the Standing Committee of the National People's Congress between 2013 and 2018. He was also the third-ranking member of the Politburo Standing Committee of the Chinese Communist Party from 2012 to 2017.

Born in Tai'an County, Liaoning, Zhang attended Yanbian University and Kim Il Sung University. Entering politics in 1983, he served as the deputy party secretary of the Yanji from 1983 to 1985 and the deputy party secretary of the Yanbian Korean Autonomous Prefecture from 1985 to 1986, when he became a vice minister of Civil Affairs. In 1990, he became the Party Secretary of Yanbian. In 1995, he was appointed as the Party Secretary of Jilin, serving there until 1998. In that year, he became the Party Secretary of Zhejiang, where he served until 2002. That year, he was promoted to the CCP Politburo and was appointed as the Party Secretary of Guangdong. During his tenure, the SARS outbreak began in Guangdong.

From 2008 to 2013, he served as vice premier in charge of energy, telecommunications, and transportation under Premier Wen Jiabao, widely known for being Wen's 'troubleshooter' of choice, leading various disaster response task forces, such as during the 2009 Heilongjiang mine explosion and the 2011 Wenzhou train collision. In March 2012, Zhang briefly replaced Bo Xilai as the party secretary of Chongqing, who was removed due to a political scandal. In 2013, he was promoted to become the third-ranking member of the CCP Politburo Standing Committee. He also became the deputy head of the National Security Commission and the top official responsible for Hong Kong and Macau affairs. He was appointed as the chairman of the NPCSC in 2013. In 2017, Zhang retired from the Politburo Standing Committee, and was succeeded by Li Zhanshu as NPCSC chair in 2018.

== Early life ==
Zhang, a native of Tai'an County, Liaoning, attended Yanbian University in Yanji, Jilin, where he studied the Korean language. Zhang enrolled in Kim Il Sung University in North Korea in August 1978 and received a degree in economics in 1980. After return to China, he became the Vice President of Yanbian University until 1983.

== Early career ==
=== Jilin ===
In August 1983, Zhang left education and started his career in politics, becoming the deputy secretary of the Yanji City CCP Municipal Committee. In 1985, he was promoted to become the deputy party secretary of the Yanbian Korean Autonomous Prefecture of Jilin Province. In August 1986, he was transferred to the State Council, becoming a vice minister at the Ministry of Civil Affairs.

Zhang rose to prominence during the era of general secretary Jiang Zemin. Zhang accompanied Jiang on a visit to North Korea in March 1990. Shortly after, in October 1990, he returned to Jilin to become the Party Secretary of Yanbian and the Deputy Party Secretary of Jilin. His connections to North Korea and his handling of illegal immigration from that country as a local official in Jilin are believed to be key factors in his rise to power. Jiang described Yanbian under Zhang as a "model prefecture" later that year. In 1995, he was made party secretary of Jilin, beginning a long road of serving as the first-in-charge of various provincial-level jurisdictions.

=== Zhejiang ===
In 1998, Zhang became party secretary of Zhejiang. Zhang was popular among business leaders in Zhejiang due to his relatively laissez-faire attitude towards private enterprise. Zhang was known for allowing private business to operate freely, within the bounds of the law.

In 2001, Zhang wrote an article attacking the idea of allowing business owners to join the Communist Party, claiming that doing so would ruin the party, shortly before Jiang formally accepted the idea through the Three Represents idea.

== Party Secretary of Guangdong ==
In November 2002, Zhang was transferred to Guangdong to become its Party Secretary. He also earned a seat on the Politburo of the Chinese Communist Party. During his tenure in Guangdong Zhang focused on issues such as the privatisation of the economy, education, and the alleviation of poverty.

=== SARS ===
Zhang's appointment came immediately after the beginning of the SARS crisis, which began in Guangdong. Zhang initially responded to the outbreak by restricting the flow of information to the public about SARS. While Zhang and other leaders in Guangdong were accused of mishandling SARS, they were praised by the World Health Organization and the central government for controlling the spread of the virus locally as well as the treatment regime employed to treat SARS patients.

=== Economy ===
Zhang arrived in Guangdong at a time when the province's economic growth seemed to be lagging coastal provinces such as Jiangsu and Shandong, both of which were a mere several hundred billion yuan away from 'catching up' to Guangdong's GDP figures. Zhang made it a top priority to stimulate the province's economy. During his five-year tenure, Zhang worked to integrate the economies of the Pearl River Delta. Immediately after arriving in Guangdong, Zhang commissioned studies on increasing economic interdependence among Hong Kong, Macau, Guangdong, Fujian, Jiangxi, Guizhou, Sichuan, Yunnan, Hunan, Hainan, and Guangxi. Critics called Pan-Pearl Delta economic integration an empty concept and alleged that Zhang was pushing the policy as a platform for future promotion. A senior journalist compared Zhang's ambitions to that of Bo Xilai, "Bo Xilai manipulates the media to promote himself, while Zhang Dejiang manipulates the media to promote his grandiose plans."

=== Freedom of speech ===
Critics accuse Zhang of suppressing freedom of the press and the right to protest. In addition to being criticised for poor handling of the SARS outbreak, Zhang was blamed for the police shooting of villagers protesting inadequate compensation for seized land in 2005. The shooting incident is believed to have led to as many as 20 deaths. During Zhang's tenure controls on the press were tightened. During this period, many editors left the Southern Daily, and the 21st Century World Herald was shuttered. These newspapers were seen as the 'bastions of liberal media' in China.

In 2005, Hong Kong activist Leung Kwok-hung created a stir when he carried apples to Guangdong to present to Zhang as a gift. The apples were a reference to the banning of reporters from the anti-Communist Apple Daily newspaper from attending the visit of Hong Kong lawmakers to Guangdong. Leung was further prevented from presenting a letter to Zhang while another legislator expressed support for independent labour unions in mainland China – Zhang responded that China would not allow such a move because it did not want a Polish-style revolution.

=== Health and education ===
Zhang also spearheaded initiatives to improve public health. For example, he implemented a plan known as "one medical station per village", granting modern clinical services to underdeveloped villages for the first time. Zhang's achievements at a time when national health care reform seemed to be failing gained him recognition from officials at the national Ministry of Health.

While planning for Guangzhou's "Education Town" began in 2000, Zhang approved the project immediately after his appointment to Guangdong and construction began in 2003. Before building began thousands of police and relocation officials armed with electric truncheons, dogs, and helicopters cleared the site of 10,000 villagers. Many villagers complained of inadequate compensation. Local media outlets were banned from reporting negative news about the project and law firms refused to handle compensation cases due to their sensitive nature. Construction was completed in a mere nine months. Contractors working on the project complained that the completion deadline was too tight and that they could not guarantee the quality of their work. Numerous artefacts believed to date to the Western Han dynasty were found during construction, but archaeologists were usually barred from entering the construction site. Zhang said of the rapid progress, "It's a modern urban construction management miracle." In 2004 a group of villa owners whose homes were confiscated to build the Guangzhou University Town threatened to sue Zhang, along with other officials, for abusing their authority. The property owners claimed that their homes were seized to provide premium land for property development.

=== Patron ties ===
It is widely believed that Zhang owes his appointment as Guangdong party secretary to then-party leader Jiang Zemin. Nonetheless, Zhang was not considered a part of the "Shanghai clique" of Jiang's closest associates. There was speculation that Zhang was allowed to remain in power in Guangdong because he switched allegiances in favour of Hu Jintao during the leadership struggle in 2003. Critics of Zhang say he obtained power through his good relationships with senior leaders instead of real achievements. Zhang is reportedly also connected to the faction of Deng Xiaoping through Deng's son Deng Pufang and fellow former Standing Committee member Yu Zhengsheng.

== Vice Premier ==
Zhang was appointed vice premier in 2008 in Wen Jiabao Government. As vice premier Zhang oversaw China's energy, telecommunications, and transportation industries. He also took over as the head of a central task force on Production Safety.

During a trip to Pakistan in 2010, Zhang was awarded the Hilal-i-Pakistan by the Pakistan's president for his role in strengthening ties between the two countries.

As vice premier, Zhang served as a 'troubleshooter-in-chief', often being dispatched to scenes of ongoing disasters to direct relief operations. He therefore emerged as a visible face of the national leadership during incidents which required on-site presence of political leaders. Zhang was the highest-ranked official on the site of the 2009 Heilongjiang mine explosion, which killed over one hundred people. He also led the response team to the crash of Henan Airlines Flight 8387 in Yichun, Heilongjiang.

During the July 2011 Wenzhou train collision, Zhang, in his capacity as vice premier in charge of transportation, was dispatched to Wenzhou to lead the search and rescue efforts on directives from General Secretary Hu Jintao and Premier Wen Jiabao. Independent sources said that he set up his 'headquarters' at the Shangri-La Hotel in downtown Wenzhou, instead of at the crash scene itself. He shouldered some responsibility for the botched handling of the rescue operations, which was widely criticised on Chinese media.

=== Chongqing ===
Zhang was appointed to lead Chongqing's party organisation in March 2012 following the removal of Bo Xilai as local party chief due to a political scandal that sent shockwaves through the top echelons of the Communist Party leadership. Zhang retained his position as vice premier during his term in Chongqing. Zhang's appointment at the sensitive time demonstrated the high level of trust placed in him among competing factions of the top leadership.

Immediately after taking office in Chongqing, Zhang made statements to ease the concerns of the business community that Bo's removal would lead to a slowdown to the city's economy. Chongqing's newspapers all featured the details of Zhang's resume immediately after his appointment. During a televised government meeting Chongqing's mayor, Huang Qifan, expressed his support for Zhang. Huang was a close ally of Bo. Civil servants in Chongqing were called to meetings where they were required to pledge allegiance to the municipality's new leadership. During the same meetings, officials were told to make social and political stability their top priorities.

== Chairman of the National People's Congress Standing Committee ==
Zhang was appointed a member of the decision-making Politburo Standing Committee after the 18th CCP National Congress held in November 2012. A few days later, he was succeeded by Sun Zhengcai as party secretary of Chongqing. On 14 March 2013, during the first session of the 12th National People's Congress. Zhang was elected as the chairman of the Standing Committee of the National People's Congress, succeeding the retiring Wu Bangguo. Zhang's election marked the decrease of the NPCSC chair's importance; Zhang was the third-ranking member behind the CCP General Secretary and the Premier, compared to Wu who was the second-ranking member. On 24 January 2014, the CCP Politburo announced Zhang's appointment as vice chairman of the newly established National Security Commission under general secretary Xi Jinping.

Since ascending to the Standing Committee, Zhang also ostensibly continued his role as an 'expert' in Korean affairs, meeting with South Korean President Park Geun-hye on two occasions: during the latter's visit to Beijing in June 2013, and on his own official visit to Seoul in June 2015. In September 2017, Zhang became the leader of a leading group which drafted the 2018 constitutional amendment.

=== Hong Kong ===
After his election to the Politburo Standing Committee, Zhang was appointed as the leader of the Central Coordination Group for Hong Kong and Macau Affairs, having succeeded Xi Jinping in 2012, making him the CCP's top leader in regards to Hong Kong and Macau affairs.

On the issue of electoral reform in Hong Kong, Zhang stuck close to the party line, reiterating the view that Beijing did not favour public nominations to the position of Chief Executive of the territory, and opposed the Occupy Central campaign. Zhang also publicly endorsed the "satisfactory" performance of chief executive Leung Chun-ying, who came under immense pressure during the Umbrella Movement to step down from office.

Zhang arrived in Hong Kong on 17 May 2016 for a three-day visit in his capacity as the official responsible for Hong Kong and Macau affairs to unprecedentedly level of security. Parts of the city were in lockdown by the 8,000 police officers who were eventually deployed. Zhang was protected by heavily armed police officers and a 45-car cortège. Despite the high level of alert, pro-democracy activists managed to put up massive banners in prominent locations to welcome Zhang – whilst some banners recalled the Umbrella revolution slogan "I want genuine universal suffrage", another, which read: "End Chinese Communist Party dictatorship", was hung up and visible to Zhang's motorcade from the airport. Zhang spoke at a policy conference on Xi Jinping's One Belt, One Road economic project.

On 6 February 2017, multiple media reports said Zhang and Sun Chunlan, head of the CCP United Front Work Department, were in Shenzhen to meet with some Election Committee members from the major business chambers and political groups. It was reported that Zhang told the electors that the Politburo had decided to support Carrie Lam in the election.

== Family ==
Zhang is married to Xin Shusen (辛树森), who was born in July 1949. Xin was originally from Haiyang, Shandong province. She served in a variety of senior executive roles at the China Construction Bank, and a member of the 11th National Committee of the Chinese People's Political Consultative Conference.

Assembly seats
Preceded by Wu Bangguo	Chairman of the Standing Committee of the National People's Congress; 2013–2018	Succeeded by Li Zhanshu
Party political offices
Preceded by He Zhukang	Party Secretary of Jilin; 1995–1998	Succeeded by Wang Yunkun
Preceded by Li Zemin	Party Secretary of Zhejiang; 1998–2002	Succeeded by Xi Jinping
Preceded by Li Changchun	Party Secretary of Guangdong; 2002–2007	Succeeded by Wang Yang
Preceded by Bo Xilai	Party Secretary of Chongqing; 2012	Succeeded by Sun Zhengcai
Order of precedence
Preceded by Li Keqiang as Premier of the State Council	Rank of the Chinese Communist Party; 18th Politburo Standing Committee	Succeeded by Yu Zhengsheng as Chairman of the CPPCC National Committee
