= Wang Rulin =

Chinese politician

- 王儒林
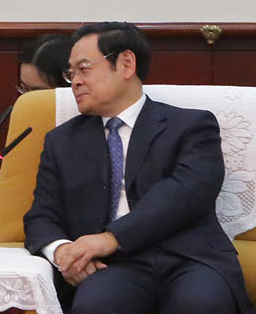

Party Secretary of Shanxi
- In office 1 September 2014 – 30 June 2016
- Deputy: Li Xiaopeng (Governor)
- Preceded by: Yuan Chunqing
- Succeeded by: Luo Huining

Party Secretary of Jilin
- In office 18 December 2012 – 31 August 2014
- Preceded by: Sun Zhengcai
- Succeeded by: Bayanqolu

Governor of Jilin
- In office 1 December 2009 – 19 December 2012
- Preceded by: Han Changfu
- Succeeded by: Bayanqolu

Personal details
- Born: April 1953 (age 73) Puyang, Henan, China
- Party: Chinese Communist Party
- Education: Jilin Agricultural University; Jilin University

Wang Rulin (Chinese: 王儒林; pinyin: Wáng Rúlín; born April 1953) is a Chinese politician and senior regional official. He is serving as Vice Chairperson of the National People's Congress Agriculture and Rural Affairs Committee. From 2014 to 2016, Wang was the Party Secretary of Shanxi, where he managed anti-corruption efforts as part of the greater anti-corruption campaign under Xi Jinping. Wang formerly served as Party Secretary (2012–14) and Governor (2009–12) of Jilin province.

== Biography ==
=== Early life ===
Wang Rulin was born in 1953 and is recorded as a native of Puyang, Henan province. During the Cultural Revolution, Wang worked in Fusong County, Jilin performing manual labour as a sent-down youth. He then went on to work for the local forestry production unit. He joined the Chinese Communist Party in November 1973. In 1975, he was recommended to partake in cadre training courses held by the Communist Party, and was then sent to work for the provincial administration of forestry and agriculture. He obtained a bachelor's degree at Jilin Agricultural University. In August, 1987, he became the provincial head of the Communist Youth League of China. In 1990, he went to study for a master's degree in economics from Jilin University.

=== Jilin ===
Wang Rulin became the mayor of Tonghua in 1993, and the city's party chief in 1994. In 1998 he was transferred to Yanbian Korean Autonomous Prefecture to be the prefectural party chief. In 2001 Wang was promoted to executive vice governor of Jilin province, and became the party secretary of the provincial capital Changchun in 2004. In December 2009 he was appointed the acting governor of Jilin, and was officially elected Governor in January 2010. In December 2012 he was promoted to Party Secretary of Jilin.

In September 2014 he was appointed party chief of Shanxi province, replacing Yuan Chunqing. Governor Bayanqolu succeeded him in his post as party chief of Jilin.

=== Shanxi and beyond ===
In Shanxi, Wang was known as an effective enforcer of the party's regulations, and worked to fill posts vacated by officials dismissed as part of a widespread anti-corruption campaign. He won particular praise for the way he had executed the 'clean-up' of the Shanxi political scene. However, the province's economy suffered during his tenure. Official numbers indicated that the province's growth rate in 2015 had slowed to a mere 3.1%, far short of the 9% goal.

In June 2016, it was announced that Wang would be replaced in his leadership position in Shanxi province. The move was unexpected because Wang had not yet reached the typical retirement age for officials of provincial ministerial rank, normally at 65. In addition, having won praise for his anti-corruption efforts in Shanxi, many observers believed Wang was destined for higher office. Wang was replaced by Luo Huining, who possessed a doctorate in economics, ostensibly to re-focus the priority of the province on economic growth.

On July 2, 2016, Wang was appointed as vice chair of the National People's Congress Agriculture and Rural Affairs Committee.

Wang was an alternate of the 17th Central Committee and is a full member of the 18th Central Committee of the Chinese Communist Party.

Party political offices
Preceded by Yuan Chunqing	Party Secretary of Shanxi; 2014–2016	Succeeded by Luo Huining
Preceded by Sun Zhengcai	Party Secretary of Jilin; 2012–2014	Succeeded by Bayanqolu
Preceded by Du Xuefang	Party Secretary of Changchun; 2004–2007	Succeeded by Gao Guangbin
Political offices
Preceded by Han Changfu	Governor of Jilin; 2009–2012	Succeeded by Bayanqolu
