= Jing Junhai =

Chinese politician

- 景俊海
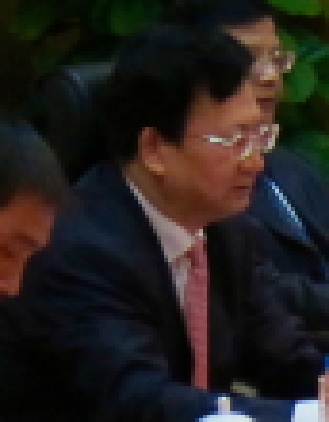

Party Secretary of Jilin
- In office 20 November 2020 – 28 June 2024
- Governor: Han Jun; Hu Yuting
- Preceded by: Bayanqolu
- Succeeded by: Huang Qiang

Governor of Jilin
- In office January 2, 2018 – November 25, 2020
- Preceded by: Liu Guozhong
- Succeeded by: Han Jun

Personal details
- Born: December 1960 (age 65) Baishui County, Shaanxi
- Party: Chinese Communist Party
- Education: Xidian University

Jing Junhai (Chinese: 景俊海; born December 1960) is a Chinese politician, serving since 2018 as the Governor of Jilin. Jing spent much of his career in Shaanxi province.

== Biography ==
Jing was born in Baishui County, Shaanxi province. He joined the Chinese Communist Party in July 1982. He attended Xi'an University of Electronics and Technology (now Xidian University) with a degree in physics. He stayed at the university to become a lecturer; in June 1992 he was promoted to associate professor.

In September 1992, he was named a project leader with the Xi'an Technology and Development Zone; there he was responsible for liaising with investors outside of mainland China and headed its innovation center. In August 1997 he was promoted to deputy head of the development zone. In May 2002 he was named head of the Xi'an Development and Planning Commission. In January 2003, he became administrative head of the development zone. In November 2005, he was named a member of the Xi'an party standing committee. In January 2008, he was appointed vice governor of Shaanxi province. In May 2012, Jing was named head of the provincial party Publicity Department and a member of the Shaanxi provincial party standing committee. It was said that during this time Jing worked on the expansion of the tombs of Xi Zhongxun.

Jing was named deputy head of the Publicity Department of the Chinese Communist Party in July 2015 and deputy party chief of Beijing in April 2017. In January 2018, Jing was appointed Governor of Jilin Province. In November 2020, Jing was appointed as the CCP Secretary of Jilin. He was removed from that post in June 2024.

Party political offices
Preceded by Bayanqolu	Party Secretary of Jilin; 2020–2024	Succeeded by Huang Qiang
Preceded by Gou Zhongwen	Deputy Party Secretary of Beijing; 2017–2018	Succeeded by Vacant
Government offices
Preceded by Liu Guozhong	Governor of Jilin; 2018–2020	Succeeded by Han Jun
