= Wu Yixia =

Chinese politician (1943–1998)

- 吴亦侠

Governor of Guizhou
- In office June 1996 – 14 September 1998
- Party Secretary: Liu Fangren
- Preceded by: Chen Shineng
- Succeeded by: Qian Yunlu

Personal details
- Born: Wu Tieyuan; 1943 Jilin City, Jilin Province, Manchukuo
- Died: 14 September 1998 (aged 54–55) Beijing, China
- Party: Chinese Communist Party
- Education: Jilin Agricultural University

Chinese name
- Simplified Chinese: 吴亦侠
- Traditional Chinese: 吳亦俠
Transcriptions
Standard Mandarin
- Hanyu Pinyin: Wú Yìxiá

Alternative Chinese name
- Simplified Chinese: 吴铁垣
- Traditional Chinese: 吳鐵垣
Transcriptions
Standard Mandarin
- Hanyu Pinyin: WúTiěyuán

Wu Yixia (Chinese: 吴亦侠; 1943 – 14 September 1998) was a Chinese politician who served as governor of Guizhou from 1996 to 1998. He was a representative of the 13th and 15th National Congress of the Chinese Communist Party. He was a member of the 15th Central Committee of the Chinese Communist Party.

== Biography ==
Wu was born Wu Tieyuan (吴铁垣) in Jilin City, Jilin Province, Manchukuo, in 1943. In 1963, he was admitted to the Department of Soil Agricultural Chemistry of Jilin Agricultural University with the second place in the province, and graduated in 1967. After university, in 1968, he was assigned to the Beidahuang Farm of a PLA unit to do farm works.

Wu joined the Chinese Communist Party (CCP) in 1965, and got involved in politics in 1970. From 1970 to 1982, he worked in both Nong'an County and Jiutai County. Starting in 1983, he successively served as executive vice mayor, deputy party secretary, and party secretary of Changchun. He was promoted to executive vice governor of Jilin in 1987, concurrently serving as deputy party secretary since 1992. In April 1993, he was appointed executive vice minister of the Ministry of Agriculture, he remained in that position until June 1996, when he was transferred to southwest China's Guizhou province and appointed deputy party secretary and governor.

On 14 September 1998, Wu died from liver cancer at the 301 Hospital in Beijing, at the age of 55.

Party political offices
Preceded by Xiao Chun	Communist Party Secretary of Changchun; 1986–1988	Succeeded by Chen Zhenkang
Government offices
Preceded by Liu Fangren	Governor of Guizhou; 1996–1998	Succeeded by Chen Shineng
