= Gao Yan (politician, born 1942) =

Chinese politician

- 高严

Party Secretary of Yunnan
- In office June 1995 – August 1997
- Preceded by: Pu Chaozhu
- Succeeded by: Linghu An

Governor of Jilin
- In office March 1992 – June 1995
- Preceded by: Wang Zhongyu
- Succeeded by: Wang Yunkun

Personal details
- Born: 1942 (age 82–83) Fuyu, Jilin Province
- Political party: Chinese Communist Party
- Education: Changchun Power School
- Occupation: Politician, engineer

Gao Yan
- Simplified Chinese: 高严
- Traditional Chinese: 高嚴
Transcriptions
Standard Mandarin
- Hanyu Pinyin: Gāo Yán
- Wade–Giles: Kao Yen

Gao Yan (born 1942) is a Chinese former politician. He served as the Governor of Jilin and the Party Secretary of Yunnan and was a member of the Central Committee of the Chinese Communist Party. He reportedly fled the country in 2002 amidst investigations into corruption as the leader of the State Power Corporation of China.

== Early life ==
Gao was born in 1942, in Fuyu County, Jilin. His family came from Hebei Province. He was admitted to the Changchun Power School, a polytechnic school, training as an engineer. Gao graduated early in 1962. He joined the Chinese Communist Party (CCP) in June 1965, after serving as a technician, supervisor, and secretary in the Communist Youth League.

== Career ==
Gao worked at the Jilin Provincial Electricity Bureau from 1975 to 1988, after which he became vice-governor of the province for the CCP. He served as Governor of Jilin from March 1992 to 1995 and was a member of the 14th and 15th Central Committees of the Chinese Communist Party.

Gao was the CCP Committee Secretary of Yunnan Province from June 1995 to August 1997 and was appointed general manager of the State Power Corporation in 1998. He oversaw a three-year credit deal with China Construction Bank in August 2001. He reportedly resigned as the director of the State Power Corporation on 2 August 2002.

== Fleeing and investigation ==
Gao left China in September 2002, weeks prior to the 16th National Congress of the CCP in November. It was reported that he was not seen in public since 29 August. He was the highest-ranking official to flee the nation in ten years.

In October of that year, Gao had been investigated by the Central Commission for Discipline Inspection for corruption and the embezzlement of funds; he was later branded a "traitor" by the Government of China. The investigation triggered a steep drop in the stock value of the State Power Corporation. There were also charges made against twenty other senior personnel of the corporation.

Some analysts believed that this was an indirect move against Li Peng, then second-in-command of the CCP and who had close links to the corporation, ahead of his expected resignation at the 16th National Congress. Ding Xueliang, an expert on corruption at Hong Kong University of Science and Technology, stated that "the leaders see how much anger has gathered in society against corrupt officials, and they know they need to punish a few to help pacify the situation".

In 2014, Gao was suspected to be living in Australia; as part of Operation Fox Hunt, the Chinese and Australian governments collaborated to attempt to track a "priority list" of wanted people, including Gao.
