= Wang Yunkun =

Chinese politician

- 王云坤

Party Secretary of Jilin
- In office August 1998 – December 2006
- Preceded by: Zhang Dejiang
- Succeeded by: Wang Min

Chairman of Jilin Provincial People's Congress
- In office February 1999 – January 2008
- Preceded by: Wang Min
- Succeeded by: Zhang Dejiang

Governor of Jilin
- In office June 1995 – August 1998
- Preceded by: Gao Yan
- Succeeded by: Hong Hu

Personal details
- Born: December 1942 (age 83) Liyang County, Jiangsu, China
- Party: Chinese Communist Party
- Education: Tianjin University

Chinese name
- Simplified Chinese: 王云坤
- Traditional Chinese: 王雲坤
Transcriptions
Standard Mandarin
- Hanyu Pinyin: Wáng Yúnkūn

Wang Yunkun (Chinese: 王云坤; born December 1942) is a Chinese politician who served as governor of Jilin from 1995 to 1998, Party Secretary of Jilin from 1998 to 2006, and chairman of Jilin Provincial People's Congress from 1999 to 2008.

He was a member of the 15th and 16th Central Committee of the Chinese Communist Party. He was a member of the Standing Committee of the 11th National People's Congress. He was a representative of the 19th National Congress of the Chinese Communist Party.

== Biography ==
Wang was born in Liyang County, Jiangsu, in December 1942, during the Republic of China. In 1961, he was accepted to Tianjin University, majoring in radio technology. After graduation in 1968, he was assigned to the Chemical Machinery Plant of Jilin Chemical Industry Company, and worked there for eleven years.

In July 1982, he became vice mayor of Jilin City, rising to mayor in March 1983. He was appointed head of Jilin Provincial Mechanical and Electronic Industry Department in January 1986, concurrently serving as director of Jilin National Defense Science, Technology and Industry Office. He was director of Jilin Provincial Economic System Reform Commission in January 1988 and then secretary-general of Jilin Provincial People's Government in May of that same year. In March 1989, he became vice governor of Jilin. He took up the post of party secretary of Changchun which he held only from November 1992 to June 1995, although he remained a vice governor of Jilin until December 1992. In June 1995, he was promoted to acting governor, confirmed in February 1996. He was elevated to party secretary of Jilin in August 1998, the top political position in the province. He concurrently served as chairman of Jilin Provincial People's Congress between February 1999 and January 2008. In March 2008, he was made vice chairperson of the National People's Congress Agriculture and Rural Affairs Committee.

Government offices
Preceded by Li Shoushan	Mayor of Jilin City; 1982–1986	Succeeded by Wu Guangcai
Preceded by Gao Yan	Governor of Jilin; 1995–1998	Succeeded by Hong Hu
Party political offices
Preceded by Feng Ximing	Party Secretary of Changchun; 1995–1998	Succeeded by Mi Fengjun
Preceded by Zhang Dejiang	Party Secretary of Jilin; 1998–2006	Succeeded by Wang Min
Assembly seats
Preceded by Zhang Dejiang	Chairman of Jilin Provincial People's Congress; 1999–2008	Succeeded by Wang Min
