= International Association of Economic and Social Councils and Similar Institutions =

AICESIS
- Founded: 1 July 1999
- Type: Nonprofit organization
- Purpose: Economy, social, social dialogue
- Headquarters: Brussels, Belgium
- Location: Global
- Members: 72 Economic and Social Councils and Similar Institutions
- Secretary General: Apostolos Xyraphis

The International Association of Economic and Social Councils and Similar Institutions (commonly known as AICESIS), an association under Dutch law, is established in Brussels, Belgium and has been founded on 1 July 1999, in Port Louis, Mauritius.

The AICESIS members are economic and social Councils, i.e. consultative institutions, including organizations representing the social partners (employers, trade unions) and other stakeholders of civil society. These are essential components of participatory governance in modern societies.

National Councils that are active members of AICESIS are autonomous bodies with national competence, drawing their authority from the constitution, the law, the decree or of any other mode of official recognition by public authorities and benefiting on their own of a real representativity of economic, social and environmental interests.

AICESIS is developing fast. In its initial composition, the AICESIS had 27 members. In 2015, AICESIS registered 72 countries from four continents: Africa, Asia – Eurasia - Middle East, Europe and Latin America and the Caribbean.

== History ==
The AICESIS creation was launched at the initiative of the President of the Economic and Social Council of France, Jean Matteoli, and the President of the Economic and Social Council of Ivory Coast, Philippe Yacé, in Caracas, Venezuela in 1997.

On 2 July 1999, in Port Louis (Mauritius), the Economic and Social Councils and Similar Institutions participants unanimously approved the founding Articles of AICESIS. These Articles were subsequently modified by the General Assemblies of Seoul, South Korea, in September 2006, and of Rio de Janeiro, Brazil, in June 2012.

=== AICESIS Presidents ===
(Two years terms)

- Herman H. F. Wijffels: 1999–2001, President of the SER of the Netherlands
- Mohamed Salah Mentouri: 2001–2003, President of the CNES of Algeria
- Jacques Dermagne: 2003–2005, President of the ESEC of France
- Wang Zhongyu: 2005–2007, President of the ESC of China
- José Mucio Monteiro: 2007–2008, President of the CDES of Brazil
- Janos Tott: 2008–2009, President of the ESC of Hungary
- Antonio Marzano: 2009–2011, President of the CNEL of Italy
- Mohamed Seghir Babes: 2011–2013, President of the CNES of Algeria
- Evgeniy Velikhov: 2013–2015, President of the CC of the Russian Federation
- Agripino Núñez Collado: 2015–2017, President of the ESC of Dominican Republic
- Iacob Baciu: 2017–2019, President of the ESC of Romania
- Aka Aouele: 2019–2021, President of the ESEC of Ivory Coast
- Lydia Mikheeva: 2021–2023, President of the CC of the Russian Federation
- John H. Jacobs: 2023–2025, President of the SER Curaçao Kingdom of the Netherlands

=== AICESIS Secretaries-General ===
(Four years terms)

- Bertrand Duruflé:1999–2008
- Patrick Venturini:2009–2016
- Francisco De Lena:2017–2021
- Apostolos Xyraphis:2021–

== Functioning ==
=== Composition ===
To date, the AICESIS has 72 members, including 62 ordinary members, 6 associate members and 4 observers.

AICESIS has 4 governing bodies:

- The General Assembly meets once a year in one of the member countries. It is sovereign and takes at an absolute majority all the important decisions for the AICESIS life.
- The Board of Directors manages the Association. It meets as often as the President or two Board members consider it desirable, usually twice a year. The Board of Directors is composed of eighteen members. They are appointed by the General Assembly for 2 years, taking into account a balanced geographical distribution (currently three representatives for Latin America and the Caribbean, six representatives for Africa, five representatives Europe, three representatives for Asia - Eurasia - Middle East).
- The President is the President of a Council or Institution full member of the AICESIS. He is appointed for two years, according to a principle of rotation on a continental basis, by the General Assembly. With the Board of Directors, the President has the responsibility to manage the AICESIS. He represents the Association and chairs the Board of Directors and the General Assembly.
- The General Secretariat is composed by a Secretary-General, elected by the General Assembly on the Board proposal for four years, Deputy Secretaries-General (one per continent) appointed by the Board for two years, an Administrator, and project managers. The Secretary-General is a permanent position at the Association, he manages the day to day AICESIS functioning, as well as the execution of missions and the monitoring of decisions. He prepares the medium term development plan of the Association, implements the decisions taken by the General Assembly and the Board, prepares and manages the budget. Finally, with the President, he ensures the representation of the AICESIS.

=== Funding ===
The AICESIS budget is essentially based on contributions from its members, the amount being determined by the General Assembly.

However, the Association also receives in-kind contributions from some members. Thus, according to their means, most of them strive for participating in the AICESIS expenses, for instance by holding and supporting expenditure related to a meeting organisation (conference, working group meetings, general assembly, board, etc.).

=== Works ===
The AICESIS medium-term development plan identifies the following priorities:

- Improve the internal governance by increasing information and transparency in the decision making process and the involvement of members;
- Develop information and communication;
- Strengthen partnerships with international organizations: ILO, United Nations Economic and Social Council (ECOSOC), United Nations Department of Economic and Social Affairs (UNDESA);
- Improve cooperation and exchange of experiences between members on concrete issues;
- Assist in the creation of ESCs in the world.

Each year, the AICESIS General Assembly decides the priority working topics for the Association. The working methods, organized by the General Secretariat, ensure that the work is accessible to all members.

Every Presidency of the Association suggests to the Assembly a main working theme. Previously, the AICESIS working themes focused on "Globalization of world trade and its consequences" (2001); "Fighting poverty through sustainable development: towards a partnership approach" (2003); "Creating an environment conducive to generating decent and productive employment and its impact on sustainable development, including sustained economic growth and poverty eradication" (2006); "Intensifying international cooperation, promoting joint development and building a harmonious world" (2007); "The role of ESCs/SIs in the new economic, social and environmental world governance" (2011); "Promoting the employment and socio-professional integration of young people: what are the new issues and what role can organized civil society play?" (2013); "National human capital and new sources of national competitiveness" (2015); "The role of the ESCs/SIs in fighting poverty-related inequalities" (2017); "The impact of digital revolution" (2019). For 2021-2023, the main working theme of Aicesis Presidency was entitled "Living in the Online Age : Looming Challenges and urge for Solutions".

Since 2007, the AICESIS gives the AICESIS Millennium Development Goals Awards. The first ones were given by the President of Brazil, Mr. Lula da Silva in November 2007 in Brasília (Brazil) to pay tribute to civil society organizations and public institutions that have undertaken noteworthy initiatives for Education (MDG 2). The second awards were given in July 2011 in Rome (Italy), with the participation of the President of Italy, Giorgio Napolitano, to noteworthy initiatives undertaken for women empowerment (MDG 3). The third awards were given in September 2013 in Algiers (Algeria) to civil society organizations that have undertaken initiatives for the achievement of the MDGs 1 and 8 "full employment, decent and productive work for poverty reduction". The last edition will be organized in September 2015 in Moscow (Russia) to reward ESCs/SIs for their actions promoting the Post-2015 Development Agenda.

Since 2009, AICESIS organized every two years, the International Summer School for young people starting their career in an ESC, a SI, a member organization of these institutions, or just involved in the social dialogue in their country. The first edition was held in August 2009 in Noordwijk (Netherlands) on "The ESCs in a globalized world." The second edition was held in Shanghai (China) in September 2012 on "The ESCs and sustainable development". The third one was organized in September 2015 in Kabardino-Balkaria (Russia) on "International cooperation between Economic and Social Councils and Similar Institutions in favor of global development."

AICESIS together with ILO organizes -in regular basis- Seminars on the issues of Social Dialogue and Sustainable Development, such as the Webinar-CESALC-Latin America and the Webinar-European Region, in December 2021. In June 2022 a major event took place in Athens (Greece) on Climate Change, gathering more than 30 Economic and Social Councils and Similar Institutions from all over the world.

Moreover, the AICESIS has developed a global database that lists all the economic and social Councils, similar Institutions or social dialogue institutions that exist around the world.

Also, the AICESIS publishes a monthly electronic newsletter available in six languages: English, Arabic, Spanish, French, Italian and Russian.

=== Relations with other international organisations ===
At its 44th plenary meeting, on 10 October 2001, the United Nations Economic and Social Council (ECOSOC), having considered the application of the International Association of Economic and Social Councils and Similar Institutions, decided, in accordance with rule 79 of the rules of procedure of the Council, that the organization might participate on a continuing basis, without the right to vote, in the deliberations of the Council on questions within the scope of its activities. Thus, the AICESIS has granted permanent observer status with general competences, under intergovernmental organization (IGO).This enables it to intervene, alongside representatives of governments and non-governmental organizations (NGOs), to express the views of ESCs/SIs at the ECOSOC annual high-level segment. In July 2022, the Secretary General of AICESIS has been invited by the President of ECOSOC H.E. Mr. Collen Vixen Kelapile as a panelists to the High Level Segment (HLS) of ECOSOC in New York, at the United Nations headquarters.

In November 2006, the Officers of the Governing Body of the ILO have considered the question of the representation of the International Association of Economic and Social Councils and Similar Institutions at ILO meetings, and vice versa. Having noted that the Director-General has received assurance that the ILO would be invited to all the AICESIS meetings of interest to it, the Officers recommend that the Governing Body permanently authorize the Director-General to invite the AICESIS to be represented at the annual sessions of the Conference and at other ILO meetings in which it has a technical interest, including meetings of the Governing Body at which issues of concern to the AICESIS are to be discussed. Thus each year, the AICESIS intervenes as an IGO, at the International Labour Conference, alongside representatives of governments and non-governmental organizations (NGOs), and expresses the views of ESCs/SIs.

In May 2012, the AICESIS and the ILO signed a cooperation agreement. The ILO and AICESIS have organized many joint conferences in this context (12–13 October 2010 in Cotonou, Benin: The role of ESCs in the implementation of the Global Jobs Pact; 12–14 April 2011 in Dakar, Senegal: The role of ESCs regarding public strategies and policies for employment and implementation of the global jobs pact; 10–11 November 2011 in Santo Domingo, Dominican Republic: Latin America regional seminar on "The role of ESCs in social dialogue"; 8–9 May 2012 in Geneva, Switzerland: social protection floor; 3–4 December 2013 in Madrid, Spain: The role of ESCs in the response to the global financial, economic and jobs crisis; 20–21 November 2014 in Seoul, South Korea: social protection floors for all).The Joint Conference for 2023 will take place on November in Athens (Greece) and will focus on the role of social dialogue and its institutions in combatting inequalities in the world of work.

In April 2024, AICESIS joined the Global Coalition for Social Justice.

Finally, thanks to the experience of the European Economic and Social Committee (EESC) and the Union of Economic and Social Councils of Africa (UCESA), the AICESIS seeks to promote regional integration process and all forms of dialogue between economic and social actors in the North and South, East and West.

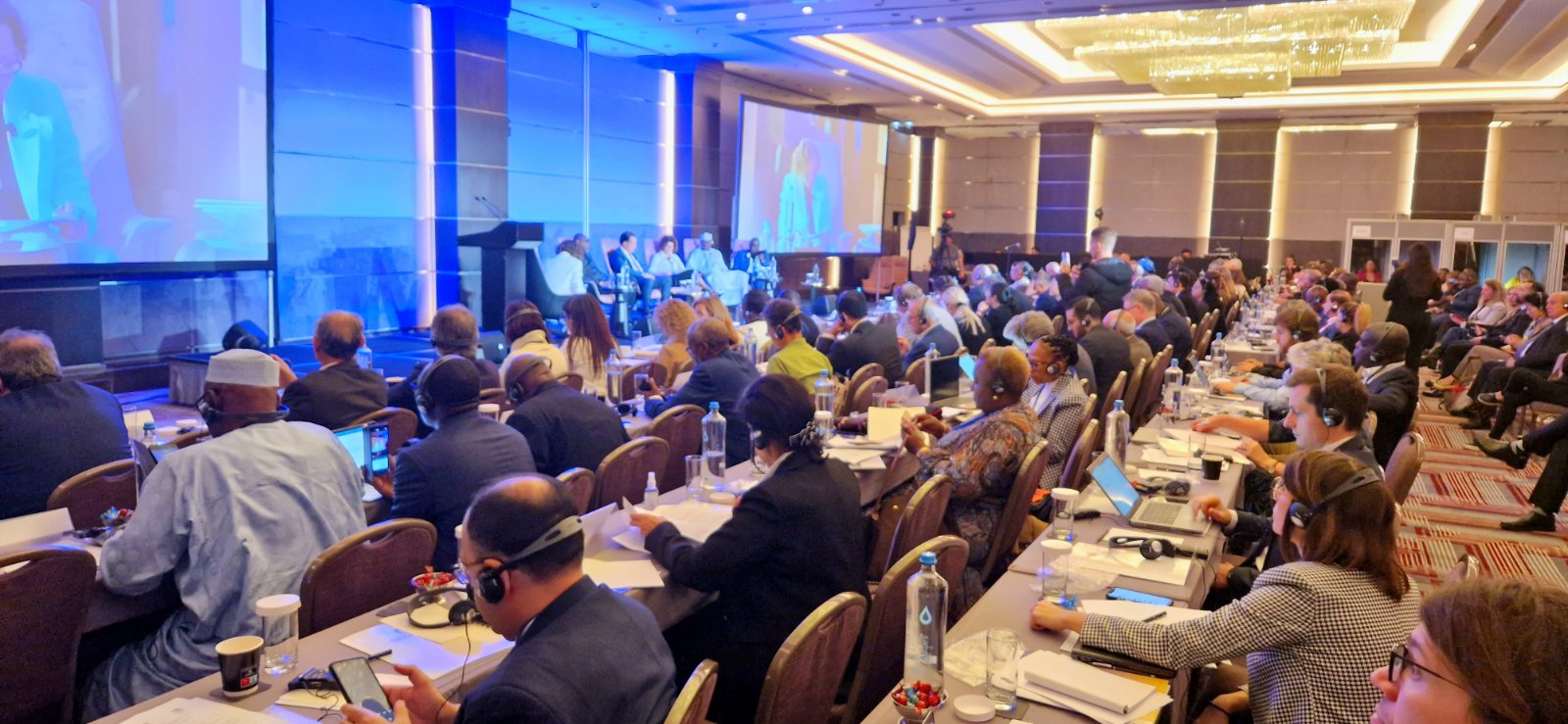
