= Huang Qiang (politician) =

Chinese politician

- 黄强
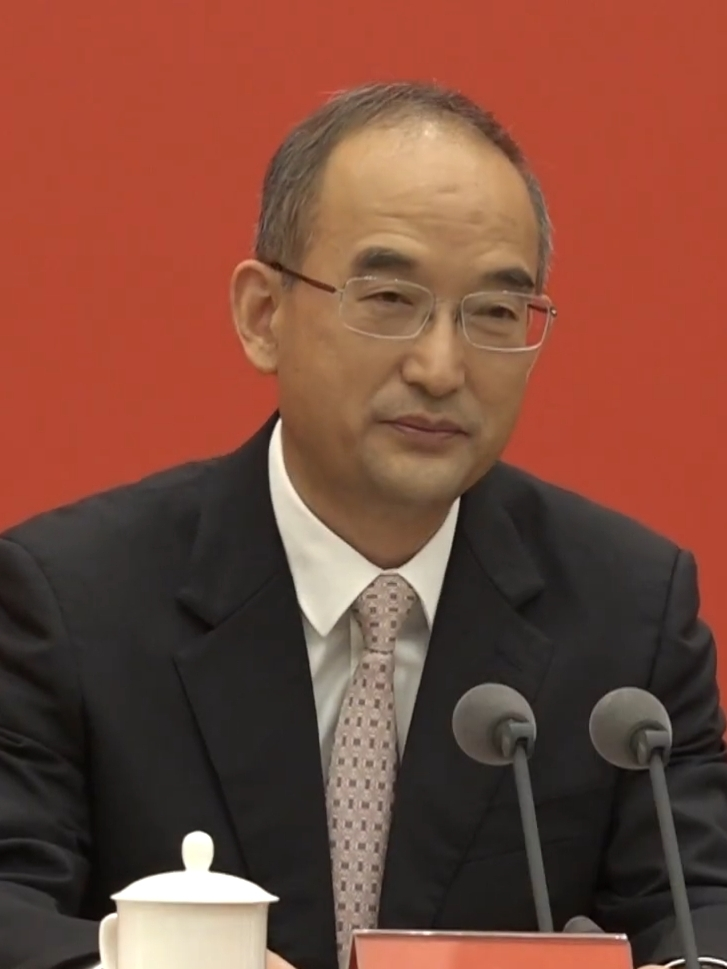
- Huang in 2022

Party Secretary of Jilin
- Incumbent
- Assumed office 28 June 2024
- Deputy: Hu Yuting
- Preceded by: Jing Junhai

Governor of Sichuan
- In office 2 December 2020 – 28 June 2024
- Preceded by: Yin Li
- Succeeded by: Shi Xiaolin

Personal details
- Born: April 1963 (age 63) Dongyang County, Zhejiang, China
- Party: Chinese Communist Party
- Education: Northwestern Polytechnical University

Chinese name
- Simplified Chinese: 黄强
- Traditional Chinese: 黃強
Transcriptions
Standard Mandarin
- Hanyu Pinyin: Huáng Qiáng

Huang Qiang (Chinese: 黄强, born April 1963) is a Chinese aerospace engineer and politician, currently serving as Party Secretary of Jilin since June 2024. He previously served governor of Sichuan Province between December 2020 and June 2024.

Huang previously served as the executive vice governor of Henan Province from 2018 to 2020 and of Gansu Province from 2017 to 2018. Prior to that, he held the positions of deputy director of the State Administration of Science, Technology and Industry for National Defense from 2008 to 2014 and secretary general of the Commission for Science, Technology and Industry for National Defense of China from 2006 to 2008. Before joining the Chinese government, Huang was employed at the First Group Corporation of the Aviation Industry Corporation of China, where he served as president of the affiliated First Aircraft Design and Research Institute from 2003 to 2006, and as director of the affiliated 603rd Institute from 2000 to 2003.

Huang is a delegate to the 13th National People's Congress and a member of the 20th Central Committee of the Chinese Communist Party.

== Early life and education ==
Huang Qiang was born in Dongyang County (now Dongyang), Zhejiang, in April 1963.

Huang completed his undergraduate education with a major in aerospace electrical engineering in 1983, received a Master of Engineering in aerospace electrical engineering in 1990, and received a Doctor of Engineering in management science and engineering in 2006, all from Northwestern Polytechnical University in Xi'an.

== Career ==
Huang served as secretary general of the Commission for Science, Technology and Industry for National Defense from 2006 to 2008, deputy director of the State Administration for Science, Technology and Industry for National Defense from 2008 to 2014, deputy governor of Gansu Province from 2014 to 2018, executive deputy governor of Gansu from 2017 to 2018, and executive deputy governor of Henan from 2018 to 2020.

In December 2020, Huang was named Chinese Communist Party Deputy Committee Secretary and acting governor of Sichuan. He was elected as governor of Sichuan in February 2021.

On 28 June 2024, Huang was appointed party secretary of Jilin, succeeding Jing Junhai.

Government offices
Preceded by Yu Haiyan	Executive Vice Governor of Gansu; 2017–2018	Succeeded by Song Liang
Preceded by Weng Jieming	Executive Vice Governor of Henan; 2018–2020	Succeeded by Zhou Ji
Preceded by Yin Li	Governor of Sichuan; 2020–2024	Succeeded by Shi Xiaolin
Party political offices
Preceded by Jing Junhai	Party Secretary of Jilin; 2024–present	Incumbent
