= Taitou, Shandong =

Taitou 台头镇
- Town
- Location in Shandong
- Coordinates: 37°01′48″N 118°38′10″E
- Country: China
- Province: Shandong
- Prefecture-level city: Weifang
- County-level city: Shouguang

Area
  - Total: 142 km^{2} (55 sq mi)
- Elevation: 4.3 m (14 ft)

Population (2006)
  - Total: 58,000
  - Density: 410/km^{2} (1,100/sq mi)
- Time zone: UTC+8 (China Standard)

Taitou (simplified Chinese: 台头镇; traditional Chinese: 台頭鎮; pinyin: Táitóu Zhèn) is a town of around 58,000 people in the north of Shandong province, People's Republic of China. Located in the northwest of Weifang city, it is under the administration of the county-level city of Shouguang city, 23 kilometres (14 mi) to the southeast, and has an area of 142 square kilometres (55 sq mi). Within the town are 41 administrative villages.

In 1958, Taitou was created as a people's commune, then changed to a town in 1984. In 2000 it absorbed the town of Niutou (牛头镇).

This Taitou wasn‘t the site of Martin C. Yang's ethnography A Chinese Village: Taitou, Shantung Province (1945).
