= He Zhukang =

Chinese politician (1932–2025)

Comrade He Zhukang

He Zhukang (Chinese: 何竹康; February 1932 – 1 April 2025) was a Chinese politician. He was born in Qidong, Jiangsu. He was a delegate to the 6th National People's Congress (1983–1988), 7th National People's Congress (1988–1993) and 8th National People's Congress (1993–1998). He was governor of Henan and Chinese Communist Party Committee Secretary, People's Congress Chairman and governor of Jilin. He died on 1 April 2025, at the age of 93.

| Preceded by Yu Mingtao | Governor of Henan; 1983–1987 | Succeeded by Cheng Weigao |
| Preceded by Gao Di | Party Secretary of Jilin; 1988–1995 | Succeeded by Zhang Dejiang |
| Preceded by Gao Dezhan | Governor of Jilin; 1987–1989 | Succeeded by Wang Zhongyu |
| Preceded by Huo Mingguang | People's Congress Chairman of Jilin | Succeeded by Zhang Dejiang |
