= Yu Ke =

Chinese politician

- 于克

Governor of Jilin
- In office 1980–1982
- Preceded by: Wang Enmao
- Succeeded by: Zhang Gensheng

Personal details
- Born: 1913 Changchun, Jilin, China
- Died: 2004 (aged 90–91)

Yu Ke (simplified Chinese: 于克; traditional Chinese: 於克; pinyin: yú kè) (1913–2004), born Yu Wen (simplified Chinese: 于文; traditional Chinese: 於文; pinyin: yú wén), was a Chinese politician. He was born in Changchun, Jilin, China. He was governor and People's Congress Chairman of his home province. He was a delegate to the 5th National People's Congress (1978–1983).

Preceded by Wang Enmao	Governor of Jilin; 1980–1982	Succeeded by Zhang Gensheng
Preceded by Li Youwen	People's Congress Chairman of Jilin	Succeeded by Zhao Xiu
