= Party Secretary of Jilin =

Provincial government position in China

Secretary of the Jilin Provincial Committee of the Chinese Communist Party
- 中国共产党吉林省委员会书记
- Emblem of the Chinese Communist Party

- Flag of the Chinese Communist Party

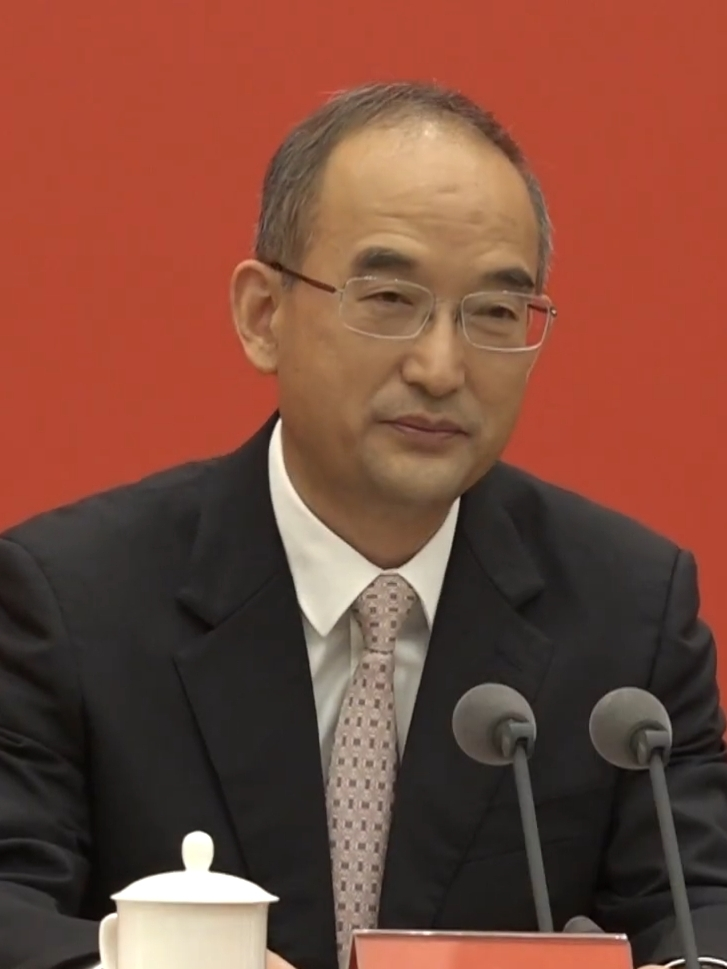
- Incumbent; Huang Qiang since 28 June 2024
- Jilin Provincial Committee of the Chinese Communist Party
- Type: Party Committee Secretary
- Status: Provincial and ministerial-level official
- Member of: Jilin Provincial Standing Committee
- Nominator: Central Committee
- Appointer: Jilin Provincial Committee; Central Committee
- Inaugural holder: Liu Xiwu
- Formation: October 1949
- Deputy: Deputy Secretary; Secretary-General

The secretary of the Jilin Provincial Committee of the Chinese Communist Party is the leader of the Jilin Provincial Committee of the Chinese Communist Party (CCP). As the CCP is the sole ruling party of the People's Republic of China (PRC), the secretary is the highest ranking post in Jilin.

The secretary is officially appointed by the CCP Central Committee based on the recommendation of the CCP Organization Department, which is then approved by the Politburo and its Standing Committee. The secretary can be also appointed by a plenary meeting of the Jilin Provincial Committee, but the candidate must be the same as the one approved by the central government. The secretary leads the Standing Committee of the Jilin Provincial Committee, and is usually a member of the CCP Central Committee. The secretary leads the work of the Provincial Committee and its Standing Committee. The secretary is outranks the governor, who is generally the deputy secretary of the committee.

The current secretary is Huang Qiang, who took office on 28 June 2024.

== List of party secretaries ==
Image	Name (English)	Name (Chinese)	Term start	Term end	Ref.
	Liu Xiwu	刘锡五	October 1949	April 1952	
	Li Mengling	李梦龄	April 1952	February 1955	
	Wu De	吴德	February 1955	June 1966	
	Zhao Lin	赵林	June 1966	1968	
	Wang Huaixiang	王淮湘	March 1971	February 1977	
	Wang Enmao	王恩茂	February 1977	October 1981	
	Qiang Xiaochu	强晓初	October 1981	May 1985	
	Gao Di	高狄	May 1985	April 1988	
	He Zhukang	何竹康	April 1988	June 1993	
	Zhang Dejiang	张徳江	June 1993	16 September 1998	
	Wang Yunkun	王云坤	16 September 1998	3 December 2006	
	Wang Min	王珉	3 December 2006	30 November 2009	
	Sun Zhengcai	孙政才	30 November 2009	18 December 2012	
	Wang Rulin	王儒林	18 December 2012	31 August 2014	
	Bayanqolu	巴音朝鲁	31 August 2014	20 November 2020	
	Jing Junhai	景俊海	20 November 2020	28 June 2024	
	Huang Qiang	黄强	28 June 2024	Incumbent	
