= Li Mengling =

Chinese politician

Party Secretary of Jilin
- Preceded by: Liu Xiwu
- Succeeded by: Wu De

Personal details
- Born: 1903 Jinzhou, Hebei, Qing China
- Died: 1985 (aged 81–82)
- Party: Chinese Communist Party

Li Mengling (Chinese: 李梦龄) (1903–1985) was a People's Republic of China politician. He was born in Jin County, Hebei Province (modern Jinzhou, Hebei Province). He was Chinese Communist Party Committee Secretary of Jilin Province. He was a deputy for Jilin to the 1st National People's Congress in August 1954.

Li Mengling joined the Chinese Communist Party (CCP) in November 1925. He graduated from the History Department of Peking Normal University in 1931. He was a northeast military academy political instructor, the Eighth Route Army Jizhong Military Region Organization Department Minister, and the Jin Sui military district deputy political commissar for some time. After the founding of the PRC, he served as vice president of the CCP Central Committee Northeast Bureau. In June 1952, he was appointed secretary of the CCP Jilin Provincial Committee and political commissar of the provincial military district. In March 1955, he was appointed secretary of the CCP Jilin Provincial Committee. In 1956 July he became the CCP Jilin Provincial Party Committee Secretary. In December 1977, he was appointed vice chairman of the 4th CPPCC of Jilin Province. In May 1980, he was appointed Deputy Director of the Standing Committee of the 5th People's Congress of Jilin Province. He was also a deputy member of the Central Oversight Committee. On April 21, 1985, he died in Changchun.

Military offices
New title	Political Commissar of the Jilin Military District; 1952–1955	Succeeded by Wu De
Party political offices
Preceded by Liu Xiwu	Party Secretary of Jilin; 1952–1955	Succeeded by Wu De
