= Taitou Village =

Village in Shandong, China

Taitou Village (simplified Chinese: 台头村; traditional Chinese: 台頭村; pinyin: Táitóu Cūn), now actually named Taitou Community (simplified Chinese: 台头社区; traditional Chinese: 台頭社區; pinyin: Táitóu ShèQū) is a village in Xin'an Subdistrict, Huangdao District, Qingdao City, Shandong Province, People's Republic of China.

Taitou Village was under the administration of Jiao County before 1945, then was under the administration of Jiaonan county.

Taitou village is as known as the hometown of Martin C. Yang. Martin C. Yang described this village in his ethnography A Chinese Village: Taitou, Shantung Province (1945).
