= Governor of Jilin =

Governor of the Jilin Provincial People's Government
- 吉林省人民政府省长
- National Emblem of China

- Flag of China

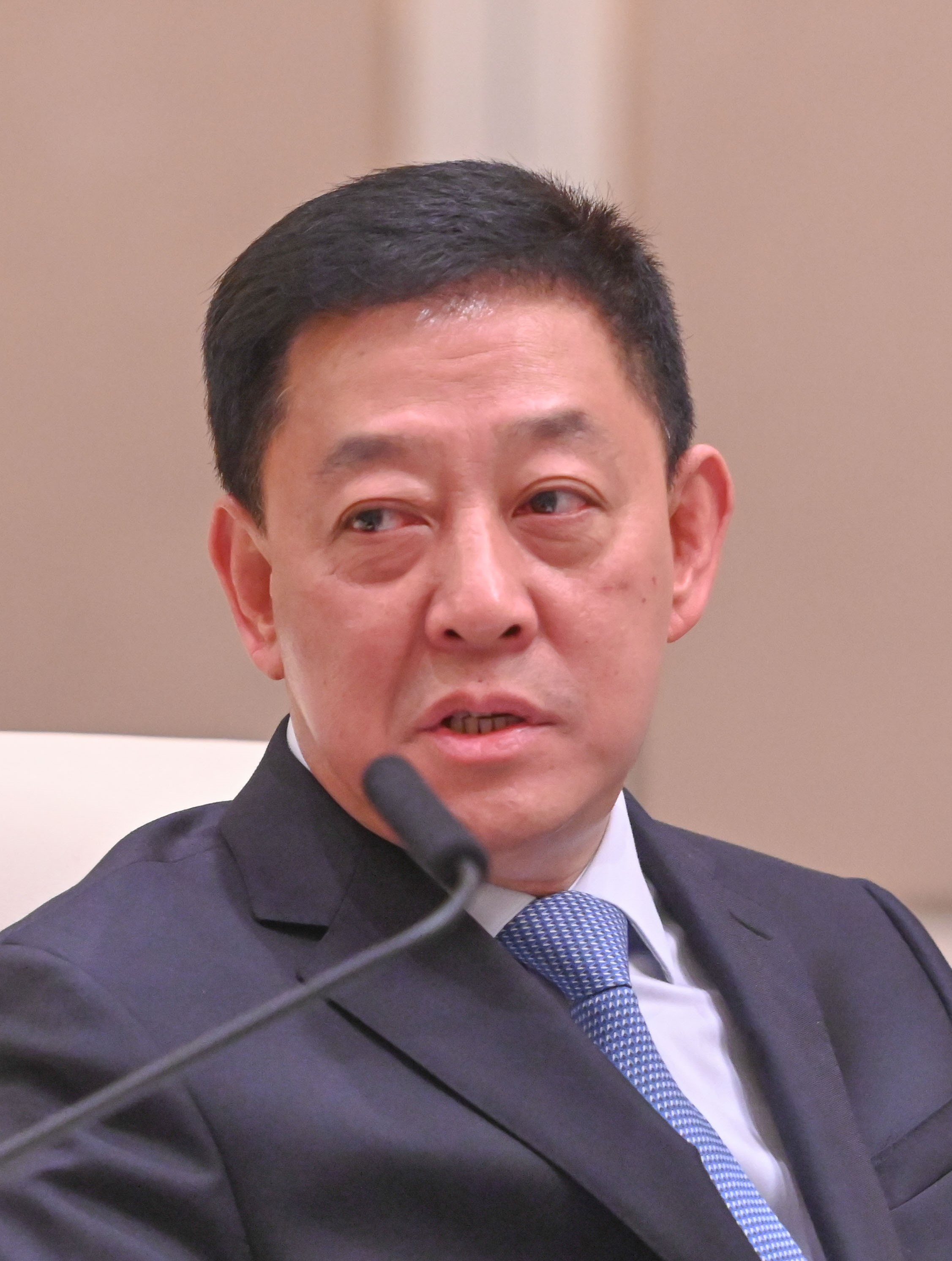
- Incumbent; Hu Yuting since 2 April 2023
- Jilin Provincial People's Government
- Type: Governor
- Status: Provincial and ministerial-level official
- Reports to: Jilin Provincial People's Congress and its Standing Committee
- Nominator: Presidium of the Jilin Provincial People's Congress
- Appointer: Jilin Provincial People's Congress
- Term length: Five years, renewable
- Inaugural holder: Zhou Baozhong
- Formation: December 1945
- Deputy: Deputy Governors; Secretary-General

The governor of Jilin, officially the Governor of the Jilin Provincial People's Government, is the head of Jilin Province and leader of the Jilin Provincial People's Government.

The governor is elected by the Jilin Provincial People's Congress, and responsible to it and its Standing Committee. The governor is a provincial level official and is responsible for the overall decision-making of the provincial government. The governor is assisted by an executive vice governor as well as several vice governors. The governor generally serves as the deputy secretary of the Jilin Provincial Committee of the Chinese Communist Party and as a member of the CCP Central Committee. The governor is the second highest-ranking official in the province after the secretary of the CCP Jilin Committee. The current governor is Hu Yuting, who took office on 2 April 2023.

== List of governors ==
=== People's Republic of China ===
No.	Officeholder	Term of office		Party	Ref.
No.	Officeholder	Took office	Left office	Party	Ref.
Governor of the Jilin Provincial People's Government
–	Zhou Baozhong (1902–1964)	December 1945	September 1949	Chinese Communist Party	
1	Zhou Chiheng (1915–1986)	September 1949	January 1952	Chinese Communist Party	
2	Li Youwen (1901–1984)	January 1952	February 1955	Chinese Communist Party	
Governor of the Jilin Provincial People's Committee
(2)	Li Youwen (1901–1984)	February 1955	March 1968	Chinese Communist Party	
Director of the Jilin Revolutionary Committee
3	Wang Huaixiang (1920–2013)	March 1968	February 1977	Chinese Communist Party	
4	Wang Enmao (1913–2001)	February 1977	March 1980	Chinese Communist Party	
Governor of the Jilin Provincial People's Government
5	Yu Ke (1913–2004)	March 1980	June 1982	Chinese Communist Party	
6	Zhang Gensheng (1923–2008)	June 1982	April 1983	Chinese Communist Party	
7	Zhao Xiu (1921–1992)	April 1983	June 1985	Chinese Communist Party	
8	Gao Dezhan (1932–2026)	June 1985	July 1987	Chinese Communist Party	
9	He Zhukang (1932–2025)	July 1987	March 1989	Chinese Communist Party	
10	Wang Zhongyu (born 1933)	March 1989	March 1992	Chinese Communist Party	
11	Gao Yan (born 1942)	March 1992	June 1995	Chinese Communist Party	
12	Wang Yunkun (born 1942)	June 1995	September 1998	Chinese Communist Party	
13	Hong Hu (born 1940)	September 1998	October 2004	Chinese Communist Party	
13	Wang Min (born 1950)	October 2004	December 2006	Chinese Communist Party	
14	Han Changfu (born 1954)	December 2006	December 2009	Chinese Communist Party	
15	Wang Rulin (born 1953)	1 December 2009	19 December 2012	Chinese Communist Party	
16	Bayanqolu (born 1955)	31 January 2013	5 September 2014	Chinese Communist Party	
17	Jiang Chaoliang (born 1957)	5 September 2014	17 November 2016	Chinese Communist Party	
18	Liu Guozhong (born 1961)	12 December 2016	2 January 2018	Chinese Communist Party	
19	Jing Junhai (born 1960)	2 January 2018	25 November 2020	Chinese Communist Party	
20	Han Jun (born 1963)	25 November 2020	2 April 2023	Chinese Communist Party	
21	Hu Yuting (born 1964)	2 April 2023	Incumbent	Chinese Communist Party	
