= Zhao Xiu =

Chinese politician

- 赵修

Governor of Jilin
- In office 1983–1985
- Preceded by: Zhang Gensheng
- Succeeded by: Gao Dezhan

People's Congress Chairman of Jilin
- In office 1983–1985
- Preceded by: Yu Ke
- Succeeded by: Huo Mingguang

Personal details
- Born: Zhao Xinyou; 1921 Jingxing County, Shijiazhuang, Hebei, China
- Died: 1992 (aged 70–71)

Zhao Xiu (simplified Chinese: 赵修; traditional Chinese: 趙修; pinyin: zhào xiū; 1921–1992), born Zhao Xinyou (simplified Chinese: 赵辛酉; traditional Chinese: 趙辛酉; pinyin: zhào xīn yǒu), was a Chinese politician. He was born in Jingxing County, Shijiazhuang, Hebei, China. He was governor and People's Congress Chairman of Jilin Province.

Preceded by Zhang Gensheng	Governor of Jilin; 1983–1985	Succeeded by Gao Dezhan
Preceded by Yu Ke	People's Congress Chairman of Jilin	Succeeded by Huo Mingguang
