= Inner Mongolia Normal University =

University in Hohhot, China

- 内蒙古师范大学 ᠥᠪᠥᠷ ᠮᠣᠩᠭᠣᠯ ‍ᠤᠨ ᠪᠠᠭᠰᠢ ‍ᠶᠢᠨ ᠶᠡᠬᠡ ᠰᠤᠷᠭᠠᠭᠤᠯᠢ
- Type: Public
- Established: 1952; 74 years ago
- Location: Hohhot, Inner Mongolia, China
- Campus: Urban & Suburban
- Website: www.imnu.edu.cn

Inner Mongolia Normal University (Chinese: 内蒙古师范大学, Mongolian: ᠥᠪᠥᠷ
ᠮᠣᠩᠭᠣᠯ
‍ᠤᠨ
ᠪᠠᠭᠰᠢ
‍ᠶᠢᠨ
ᠶᠡᠬᠡ
ᠰᠤᠷᠭᠠᠭᠤᠯᠢ) is a university in Inner Mongolia, People's Republic of China under the authority of the Autonomous Region government. It is located in Hohhot, the capital city of Inner Mongolia Autonomous Region.

Established in 1952, it is the first university established in Inner Mongolia after the foundation of the People's Republic of China in 1949. It was later made a "key university" (重点大学) in Inner Mongolia.

== Affiliated Middle School ==
Affiliated Middle School to Inner Mongolia Normal University
- 內蒙古師範大學附屬中學
- Hohhot

Information
- Type: Public
- Motto: 敦品，礪學，養志，創新
- Established: 1954; 72 years ago
- President: Zhang Wei
- Website: en.imnu.edu.cn

The Affiliated Middle School to Inner Mongolia Normal University (simplified Chinese: 内蒙古师范大学附属中学; traditional Chinese: 內蒙古師範大學附屬中學), abbreviated as Fuzhong, is a public secondary school serving senior high school levels, located in Hohhot, Inner Mongolia, China.

Founded in 1954, the Affiliated Middle School to Inner Mongolia Normal University is a public high school which blends Chinese and Mongolian cultures. It is a key provincial high school in Inner Mongolia and is one of the top high schools incorporating historical and cultural aspects of the region.

The school presently has three key programs with teaching incorporating three languages, Mandarin Chinese, Mongolian and English.

The school campus is in the southern part of urban area and surrounded by many universities such as Inner Mongolia University, Inner Mongolia Normal University and Inner Mongolia Agricultural University. The main campus is in No.10, Daxue West Street, Saihan District, Hohhot.

The contact number of school is 0471-6293680.

== See also ==
- Hohhot
- Hohhot No.2 Middle School
