= Wang Guofa (engineer) =

Chinese engineer

- 王国法
- Born: 1 August 1960 (age 66); Wendeng County, Shandong, China
- Education: Shandong University; Northeastern University
- Scientific career
- Fields: Coal mining technology and equipment
- Workplaces: China Coal Technology Engineering Group

Chinese name
- Simplified Chinese: 王国法
- Traditional Chinese: 王國法
Transcriptions
Standard Mandarin
- Hanyu Pinyin: Wáng Guófǎ

Wang Guofa (born 1 August 1960) is a Chinese engineer who is a researcher at the China Coal Technology Engineering Group, and an academician of the Chinese Academy of Engineering.

== Biography ==
Wang was born in Wendeng County (now Wendeng District of Weihai), Shandong, on 1 August 1960. His father worked in a state owned aquatic products company and his mother was a farmer. He secondary studied at the High School of Xiaoguan People's Commune (小观公社中学). After resuming the college entrance examination, in 1978, he enrolled at Shandong Institute of Technology (now Shandong University), majoring in the Mechanical Department. He went on to receive his master's degree from Northeast Institute of Technology (now Northeastern University) in 1985.

He entered the workforce in January 1982, and joined the Chinese Communist Party in July 1996. After graduating, in December 1985, he was dispatched to the Beijing Mining Research Institute, China Coal Research Institute, becoming senior engineer in 1991. He is now a researcher at the China Coal Technology Engineering Group.

== Honours and awards ==
- 2012 State Science and Technology Progress Award (Second Class)
- 2013 State Science and Technology Progress Award (Second Class)
- 2014 State Science and Technology Progress Award (First Class)
- 27 November 2017 Member of the Chinese Academy of Engineering (CAE)
