= Zhang Gensheng =

Chinese politician

- 张根生

Governor of Jilin
- Preceded by: Yu Ke
- Succeeded by: Zhao Xiu

Personal details
- Born: 1923 Anping County, Hengshui, Hebei, China
- Died: 2008 (aged 84–85)

Zhang Gensheng (simplified Chinese: 张根生; traditional Chinese: 張根生; pinyin: zhāng gēn shēng; 1923–2008) was a Chinese politician. He was born in Anping County, Hengshui, Hebei, China. He was governor of Jilin Province.

Preceded by Yu Ke	Governor of Jilin	Succeeded by Zhao Xiu
