= Wang Zhongyu (politician, born 1933) =

Chinese engineer, politician and diplomat

- 王忠禹
- Born: February 1933 (age 93); Changchun
- Education: Central Party School of the Chinese Communist Party
- Occupations: Politician, diplomat, engineer
- Known for: Politician promoting China's economic modernization
- Political party: Chinese Communist Party

Wang Zhongyu
- Chinese: 王忠禹
Transcriptions
Standard Mandarin
- Hanyu Pinyin: Wáng Zhōngyǔ
- Wade–Giles: Wang Chung-yü

Wang Zhongyu (born February 1933) is a Chinese engineer, politician, and diplomat of the People's Republic of China. An associate of Zhu Rongji, he was involved with the modernization and continued opening up of China and its economy during the 1990s and 2000s.

== Life ==
Wang Zhongyu was born in February 1933 in Changchun, then the capital of the Japanese puppet state of Manchuria. (It now forms part of the northeastern Chinese province of Jilin.) He attended Changchun's now-prestigious High School Attached to Northeast Normal University, followed by studies at the Light Industry Vocational School in Shenyang (1950–1953). He worked as a technician at the Jilin Paper Mill before joining the Chinese Communist Party (CCP) in May 1956, after which he slowly rose in position from deputy workshop head to engineer to deputy factory director to chief engineer of the factory by 1980. At that point, he was named deputy director of Jilin's provincial Light Industry Bureau in 1980.

After studying at the CCP Central Party School in Beijing in 1981 and 1982, he rose very quickly through the ranks of Jilin's provincial administration as it accommodated itself to the economic and structural reforms undertaken by Deng Xiaoping. Wang returned to Jilin as the director of the province's Light Industry Bureau (1982–1983), was promoted to vice-governor and secretary-general of the provincial CCP committee (1983–1985), and then served as acting governor of Jilin Province from 1985 to 1989. He then served as governor in his own right until 1992. While serving as acting and full governor, he was also deputy secretary of the provincial CCP committee. During Wang's tenure, Jilin began to adapt itself to Deng's policies but in a slow and half-hearted fashion, needing to spend extra time combating bureaucratic growth and adapting policies years later than more progressive provinces like Shandong. The favored position of northeastern industries under Mao Zedong and the province's lack of a port limited its people's desire and ability to participate in China's new economy.

Wang then received national assignments. Having been an alternate member of the 13th Central Committee of the CCP (1987–1992), he was named a full member of its 14th and 15th sittings (1992–2002). In particular, Wang was a minister-level deputy director and secretary at the State Planning Commission from 1993 to 1998, where he headed its State Economic and Trade Commission under direction from Zhu Rongji. The SETC's remit was to promote a market economy in more spheres of Chinese life. It was particularly focused on reforming state-owned enterprises to accommodate allocation of their resources by prices set by a more open market and adjusting governmental policies to accommodate this. Jilin had many SOEs, which Wang had long experience with, and he became one of the most vocal champions of Zhu's policies to modernize and improve them.

During this period, Wang was one of the most powerful leaders in the Chinese government. He was part of a consultative group tasked with exploring how far and fast the PRC could move towards democracy; the group's ultimate decision was to leave open elections limited to the local level, where they permitted immediate and daily grievances to be addressed without impacting Beijing's general guidance over the country. Wang also used his national influence to push for more development in Jilin, particularly the establishment of international agreements permitting Hunchun on the Tumen River to freely access the Sea of Japan across the narrow spit of territory held by North Korea and Russia. This had been a pet project of his since 1988, when the first regional conference on the topic had been held in Changchun. To permit the use of larger vessels, cooperation has slowly developed between China and North Korea in order to allow the Chinese to use the seaport of Rason, with Hunchun functioning more as its railway hub.

Again with the assistance of Zhu Rongji, Wang served as secretary-general of the State Council from March 1998 to March 2003, during which time he was appointed president of the National School of Administration (now the "Academy of Governance"), helped revamp the administration of the One Child Policy, served as the head of the leading group that oversaw China's 5th national census, and sat as a member of the steering committee that oversaw the 2001 APEC summits around China. In 1999, he also participated in the transfer of Macao from Portuguese to Chinese control. From 5 March 2003 to 5 March 2008, he was vice-chairman of the People's Political Consultative Conference. In 2005, he headed a Chinese diplomatic mission to Ghana from May 31 to June 2. He served as president of the International Association of Economic and Social Councils and Similar Institutions from 2005 to 2007.

== See also ==
- Opening Up Policy & the "Three Represents"
- History of the PRC from 1989 to 2002
- Politics of the People's Republic of China
