= University of Jinan =

Provincial public university in Jinan, Shandong, China

- 济南大学
- Motto: 弘毅, 博学, 求真, 至善
- Type: Public
- Established: 2000
- President: Liu Zongming (刘宗明)
- Faculty: ~2,200
- Students: ~36,000
- Location: Jinan, Shandong, China
- Website: ujn.edu.cn

Chinese name
- Simplified Chinese: 济南大学
- Traditional Chinese: 濟南大學
Transcriptions
Standard Mandarin
- Hanyu Pinyin: Jǐnán Dàxué

The University of Jinan (/dʒiːˈnɑːn/ JEE-NAHN; UJN, 济南大学) is a provincial public university in Jinan, Shandong, China. It is affiliated with the Shandong Provincial People's Government, and co-funded by the Shandong Provincial People's Government and the Ministry of Education. The university is part of Plan 111 and Outstanding Engineer Education and Training Program. The university has the authority to confer bachelor's, master's, and doctoral degrees, as well as the right to recommend students for exemption from the entrance examination for graduate studies.

== History ==
In 1948, the Shandong Institute of Building Materials, the predecessor of University of Jinan, was established in Zibo, Shandong.

In 1983, the Shandong Institute of Building Materials was approved to move to Jinan, the capital of Shandong.

In 2001 after the merger with three colleges, the Shandong Institute of Building Materials was officially renamed the University of Jinan and Shao Guifang, Vice Governor of Shandong Province, and Lü Fuyuan, Vice Minister of Education of China, unveiled the plage for it.

== Campus ==
The university has three campuses, occupying an area of over 2.43 million square meters (243 hectares (600 acres)) and its total construction area is 1.02 million square meters. The value of fixed assets totals up to 2.14 billion yuan and teaching facilities are worth 370 million yuan. The library occupies an area of 63,000 square meters and is equipped with a digital system, an information searching system, with a collection of more than 4.6 million printed and electronic books, and 4,200 kinds of Chinese and foreign periodicals, and possesses 23,000 kinds of electronic journals. In addition, the campus network is connected with the China Education and Research Network.

== Schools and departments ==
The University of Jinan has 24 schools, and 2 post-doctoral research center, there are 3 doctorates have been awarded first-level discipline, 26 doctorate has been awarded discipline, 20 master's degree have been awarded first-level discipline and 144 master's degree have been awarded discipline. There are 6 majors for masters and 92 majors for bachelors. There are ten kinds of major specialties including Economics, Law, Education, Literature, History, Science, Technology, Medicine, Management, art, etc. There are 35916 full-time undergraduates, postgraduates and foreign students.

| School of Literal Arts | School of Mathematical Science | School of Physics and Technology |
| School of Business | School of Foreign Languages | School of Political Science and Law |
| School of Marxism | School of Material Science and Engineering | School of Chemistry and Chemical Engineering |
| School of Mechanical Engineering | School of Civil Engineering and Architecture | School of Automation and Electrical Engineering |
| School of Information Science and Engineering | School of Resources and Environment | School of Physical Education |
| School of Fine Arts | School of Music | School of History and Culture Industry |
| School of Education and Psychology | School of Medicine and Life Sciences | School of Biological Science and Technology |
| School of Continuing Education | School of International Education and Exchange | School of Entrepreneurship |

=== Discipline ===
- Diligence, Rigorousness, Unity, and Creativity.

=== Emblem ===
- The emblem was designed with the Chinese character "济" (meaning the city of Jinan) written in the seal calligraphic style in vogue during the Qin dynasty at the center. It is a pictograph of a boat on water showing Jinan geographical cultures-water and UJN spirit-cooperating by riding the same boat.
- The colours are red for passion, green for youth, and blue for the breadth, which is in accordance with the university's education philosophy.
- The figure "1948" means the time for the birth of the University of Jinan.

== Academics and research ==
The University of Jinan claims 1981 full-time teaching staff, of which 305 are professors, 707 are associate professors, 841 faculties who have earned doctoral degrees.

There are 54 key disciplines and research bases at the national or provincial level. In addition, there is one key national laboratory managed by the Shandong Provincial Government and one engineering research center under the Chinese Ministry of Education. Further, there are 14 key provincial discipline bases, 10 key provincial level laboratories, 4 key laboratories funded by the Shandong "Twelfth-Five-Year Plan", 8 social science research bases approved by the Shandong Provincial Government, and 14 provincial-level engineering research centers. The university has established 4 national-level distinctive specialties, 5 national-level quality courses, 2 national-level exemplary bilingual courses, 2 national-level quality public audio and video courses, 6 specialties training for Outstanding Engineers, 16 provincial-level distinct specialties, 9 specialties jointly supported by the school and enterprise, 53 provincial-level top-grade courses and 5 provincial-level experimental teaching centers. In recent years, the faculties have undertaken 6 national teaching and research projects and 55 provincial projects, published 8 textbooks guided by China, and won 3 national "Teaching Achievements" awards and 75 provincial "Teaching and Research Achievements" awards. In addition, the university has successively won a wide variety of honors for innovation and creativity, such as the "Challenge Cup" Extracurricular and Academic Contest, and China Undergraduate Mathematical Contest in Modeling. The students have won 3133 provincial or national awards, of which 48 are first prizes and 125 are second prizes at the national level.

In recent years, the university has undertaken 347 national research projects including funds from the National Science and Technology Support Program, 973 project program, 863 project program, and support from the Natural Science Foundation of China, and Social Science Foundation of China, and 814 provincial projects. The university has won 238 national and provincial prizes for research achievements, one second prize of National Award for Technological Invention and 3 second prizes of National Award for Science and Technology Progress, and obtained 666 national patents. 4799 papers were indexed by SCI, EI or ISTP. 214 academic works, translations or textbooks were published. Eight journals are currently sponsored by the University of Jinan, including "China Powder Science and Technology", "Chinese Journal of Cancer Prevention and Treatment", and "Journal of University of Jinan".

== International cooperation and exchange ==
The University of Jinan advocates an open education, and communicates and cooperates with different countries and districts in an active and all-around way. It has established communicative and cooperative mechanism with many research institutes as well as inter-school cooperation with 77 universities of America, Canada, United Kingdom, Germany, France, Australia, Japan, Congo, Brazil and so on.

The university attaches importance to international communication and cooperation, and the international construction of the teaching staff. In recent years, about one hundred teachers and academic leaders have been sent abroad each year for cooperative researches, further study and international academic conferences in developed countries such as America, Canada, Australia, Germany, and the United Kingdom. The university undertakes international academic conferences, and achieves success in ten influential international academic conferences and bilateral peak forums including the first international academic conference about advanced materials, the international academic conference about the design and application of intelligent system in recent years. The university also strengthens the employment of the foreign teachers, and over 300 foreign teachers and scholars from America, Britain, France, Germany and other countries have been invited to lecture, teach or to conduct research, and among them tens of internationally celebrated scholars were employed as visiting professor or emeritus professor.

The university actively advances two-way abroad study. As a university receiving abroad students granted to scholarships of Chinese government and provincial government for abroad students and the Confucius Institute, she accepts over 2100 international students from the U.S, South Korea, Indonesia, Ghana, Pakistan, Spain, Australia, Britain, France and other countries, and sets up a comprehensive and characteristic educational system for overseas students. In 2017, there are over 700 regular international students. The university adheres to the international education idea of going out, and every year sends hundreds of students to foreign prestigious universities for communication, short-term study and practice to cultivate their international horizon and promote their international competitiveness.

The university develops education cooperated with foreign countries. In recent years, taking the internalization education as its orientation, the university imports more qualified education resources by cooperating with foreign universities of the U.S. Canada, Australia, South Korea and the United Kingdom, and now it has four undergraduate programs cooperated with foreign universities. With the cooperative education, it not only absorbs the advanced curriculum setting, teaching contents and manners of foreign universities and promotes internalization of discipline construction, but also cultivates many creative graduates with proper international communicative capacity and competitiveness.

The university attaches importance to the international promotion of Chinese language. In the past several years, the university actively responds to the deployment of the Confucius Institute Headquarter and the provincial Education Department by dispatching teachers and volunteers abroad to teach Chinese in countries like Ethiopia, Thailand, South Korea, and the Republic of Congo. In addition, 3 Confucius Institutes has been built up in the Republic of Congo in Africa, South Dakota and City and County of Denver in America.
