= Wang Huaixiang =

Chinese general and politician

Governor of Jilin
- In office 1968–1977
- Preceded by: Li Youwen
- Succeeded by: Wang Enmao

Personal details
- Born: 1920 Taitou, Shandong, China
- Died: February 23, 2013 (aged 92 or 93)
- Party: Chinese Communist Party

Wang Huaixiang (Chinese: 王淮湘) (1920 – February 23, 2013) was a Chinese politician. He was born in Taitou, Shandong (part of Shouguang). He was the chairman of the Revolutionary Committee (i.e., governor) of Jilin. He was a delegate to the 4th National People's Congress and a member of the 9th Central Committee of the Chinese Communist Party and 10th Central Committee of the Chinese Communist Party.

He joined the Communist Party in 1937 and initially fought as a soldier against the Japanese, subsequently rising through the ranks. In April 1945, he became the deputy head of the organization department of the Political Department of the Shandong Military Region. By June 1948, he had attained the position of the deputy minister of the organization department of the Fifth Column of the Northeast Field Army.

A beneficiary of the Cultural Revolution, Wang was quarantined for investigation in December 1977, and expelled from the Communist Party in February 1985.

Preceded by Zhao Lin	Communist Party Secretary of Jilin	Succeeded by Wang Enmao
Preceded by Li Youwen	Governor of Jilin; 1968–1977	Succeeded by Wang Enmao
