= Hong Hu (politician) =

Chinese politician

- 洪虎

Governor of Jilin
- In office February 1999 – October 2004
- Party Secretary: Wang Yunkun
- Preceded by: Wang Yunkun
- Succeeded by: Wang Min

Personal details
- Born: June 1940 (age 86) Jinzhai County, Anhui, China
- Party: Chinese Communist Party
- Parent(s): Hong Xuezhi; Zhang Wen
- Education: Beijing Institute of Technology

Hong Hu (Chinese: 洪虎; pinyin: Hóng Hǔ; born June 1940) is a Chinese politician who served as governor of Jilin from 1999 to 2004. He was a delegate to the 9th, 10th, and 11th National People's Congress. He was a member of the 14th CCP Central Commission for Discipline Inspection. He was a member of the 15th and 16th Central Committee of the Chinese Communist Party.

== Biography ==
Hong was born in Jinzhai County, Anhui, in January 1940, to Hong Xuezhi (1913–2006), a general in the People's Liberation Army, and Zhang Wen (张文). In 1958, he entered Beijing Institute of Technology, majoring in the Department of Chemical Engineering. After graduating in 1963, he was assigned to Jilin Chemical Industrial Company, and then the Qinghai Liming Chemical Plant in October 1965. He worked there for 12 years.

Hong joined the Chinese Communist Party (CCP) in June 1965, and got involved in politics in December 1977, when he was appointed director of the Comprehensive Planning Division of the Second Bureau of the Ministry of Chemical Industry. He became a director in the newly founded National Machinery Industry Committee in March 1980, and a director in the newly founded State Commission for Restructuring Economy in May 1982. In November 1984, he became deputy secretary-general of the State Commission for Restructuring Economy, rising to secretary-general in February 1991. He also served as a deputy director from February 1991 to December 1994. In March 1988, he was chosen as deputy director of the Economic Restructuring Office of the State Council, but having held the position for only five months.

In August 1999, he was transferred to northeast China's Jilin province and appointed deputy party secretary. In September, he was named acting governor, confirmed in February 1999.

In February 2005, he took office as vice chairperson of the National People's Congress Constitution and Law Committee, a post he kept until March 2013.

Government offices
Preceded by Wang Yunkun	Governor of Jilin; 1999–2004	Succeeded by Wang Min
