= Jilin Provincial Committee of the Chinese Communist Party =

Jilin Provincial Committee of the Chinese Communist Party 中国共产党吉林省委员会

Overview
- Type: Highest decision-making organ when Jilin Provincial Congress is not in session.
- Elected by: Jilin Provincial Congress
- Length of term: Five years
- Term limits: None
- First convocation: November 1945; 79 years ago

Leadership
- Secretary: Huang Qiang
- Executive organ: Standing Committee
- Inspection organ: Commission for Discipline Inspection

Meeting place
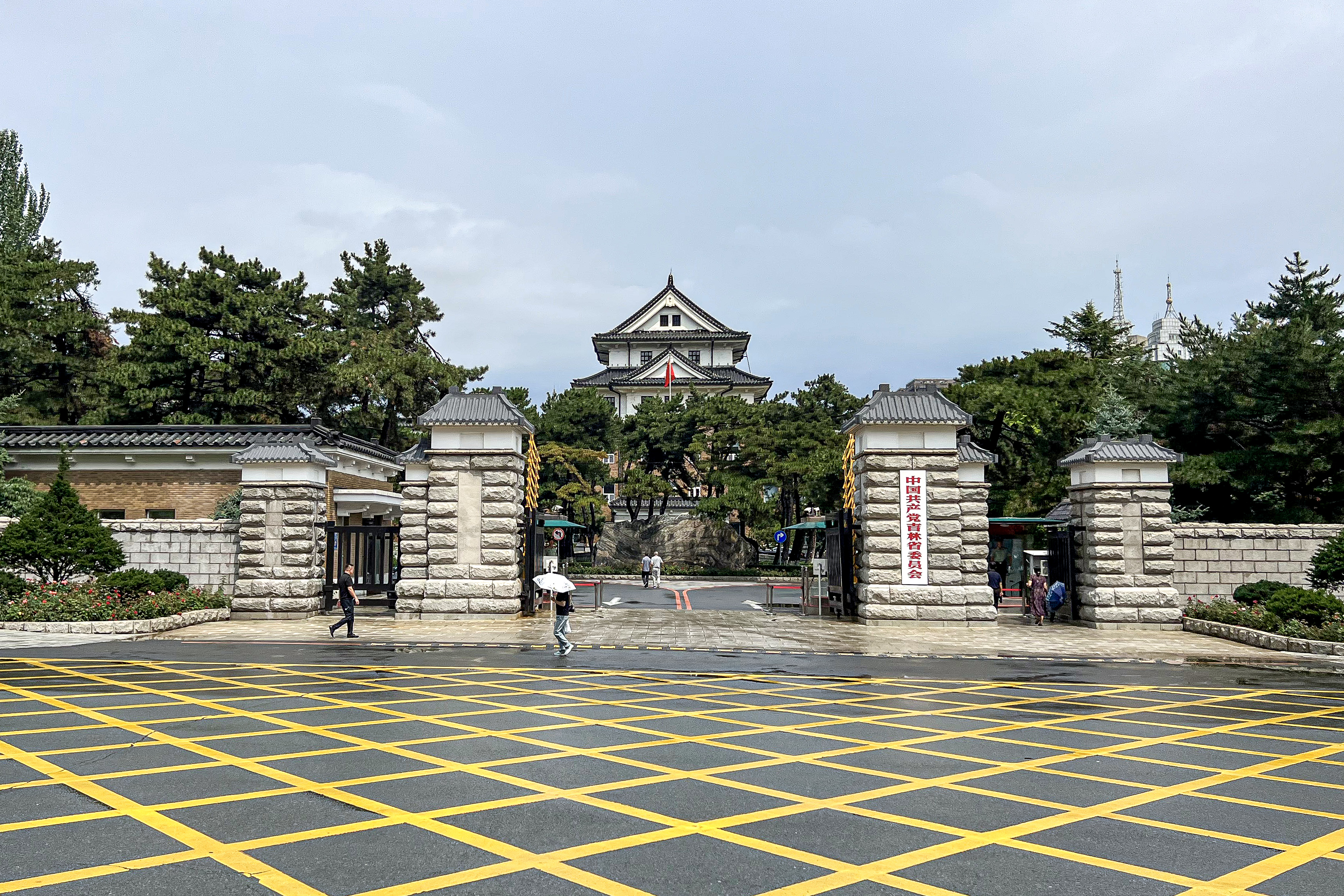
- Jilin Provincial Committee Building

Jilin Provincial Committee of the Chinese Communist Party
- Simplified Chinese: 中国共产党吉林省委员会
- Traditional Chinese: 中國共產黨吉林省委員會
Transcriptions
Standard Mandarin
- Hanyu Pinyin: Zhōngguó Gòngchǎndǎng Jílínshěng Wěiyuánhuì

Abbreviation
- Simplified Chinese: 中共吉林省委
- Traditional Chinese: 中共吉林省委
- Literal meaning: CCP Jilin Provincial Committee
Transcriptions
Standard Mandarin
- Hanyu Pinyin: Zhōnggòng Jílínshěng Wěi

The Jilin Provincial Committee of the Chinese Communist Party is the provincial committee of the Chinese Communist Party (CCP) in Jilin, China, and the province's top authority. The CCP committee secretary is the highest ranking post in the province.

== History ==
The Jilin Provincial Committee of the Chinese Communist Party was established as Jilin Provincial Working Committee of the Chinese Communist Party (中国共产党吉林省工作委员会) in November 1945, during the Republic of China.

== Organizations ==
The organization of the Jilin Provincial Committee includes:

- General Office

=== Functional Departments ===
- Organization Department
- Publicity Department
- United Front Work Department
- Political and Legal Affairs Commission
- Social Work Department
- Commission for Discipline Inspection
- Supervisory Commission

=== Offices ===
- Policy Research Office
- Office of the Cyberspace Affairs Commission
- Office of the Foreign Affairs Commission
- Office of the Deepening Reform Commission
- Office of the Institutional Organization Commission
- Office of the Military-civilian Fusion Development Committee
- Taiwan Work Office
- Office of the Leading Group for Inspection Work
- Bureau of Veteran Cadres

=== Dispatched institutions ===
- Working Committee of the Organs Directly Affiliated to the Jilin Provincial Committee

=== Organizations directly under the Committee ===
- Jilin Party School
- Jilin Daily Newspaper Group
- Jilin Institute of Socialism
- Party History Research Office
- Jilin Provincial Archives
- Lecturer Group

=== Organization managed by the work organization ===
- Confidential Bureau

== Leadership ==
=== Heads of the Organization Department ===
Name (English)	Name (Chinese)	Tenure begins	Tenure ends	Note
Wang Qiushi	王秋实	July 2023		

=== Heads of the Publicity Department ===
Name (English)	Name (Chinese)	Tenure begins	Tenure ends	Note
Cao Lubao	曹路宝	October 2023		

=== Secretaries of the Political and Legal Affairs Commission ===
Name (English)	Name (Chinese)	Tenure begins	Tenure ends	Note
Li Mingwei	李明伟	June 2022		

=== Heads of the United Front Work Department ===
Name (English)	Name (Chinese)	Tenure begins	Tenure ends	Note
Han Fuchun	韩福春	December 2023		

== See also ==
- Politics of Jilin
