= Wang Guofa (politician) =

Chinese politician

Wang Guofa (Chinese: 王国发; November 1945 – 16 September 2018) was a Chinese politician who served as Vice Governor of Jilin Province and Chairman of the Jilin Provincial Committee of the Chinese People's Political Consultative Conference (CPPCC).

== Biography ==
Wang was born in November 1945 in Yushu, Jilin. After graduating from Northeast Forestry University in 1970, he joined the work force in August 1970 and the Chinese Communist Party (CCP) in June 1971.

He worked for Tonghua Textile Machinery Plant before entering politics, serving as vice mayor of Tonghua county-level city, CCP Deputy Committee Secretary of Tonghua Prefecture, and CCP Committee Secretary of Tonghua prefecture-level city.

Wang was appointed vice governor of Jilin Province in January 1993, and became a member of the Jilin provincial party standing committee in September 1997. He was promoted to deputy party secretary of Jilin in May 2000, and served as Chairman of the Jilin Provincial Committee of the CPPCC from May 2003.

Wang was a delegate to the 13th, 14th, 16th, and 17th National Congress of the Chinese Communist Party, a member of the 9th National People's Congress, and a member of the 10th, 11th, and 12th National Committee of the CPPCC.

Wang died in Beijing on 16 September 2018, aged 72.
