= Hu Yuting =

Chinese executive and politician

- 胡玉亭
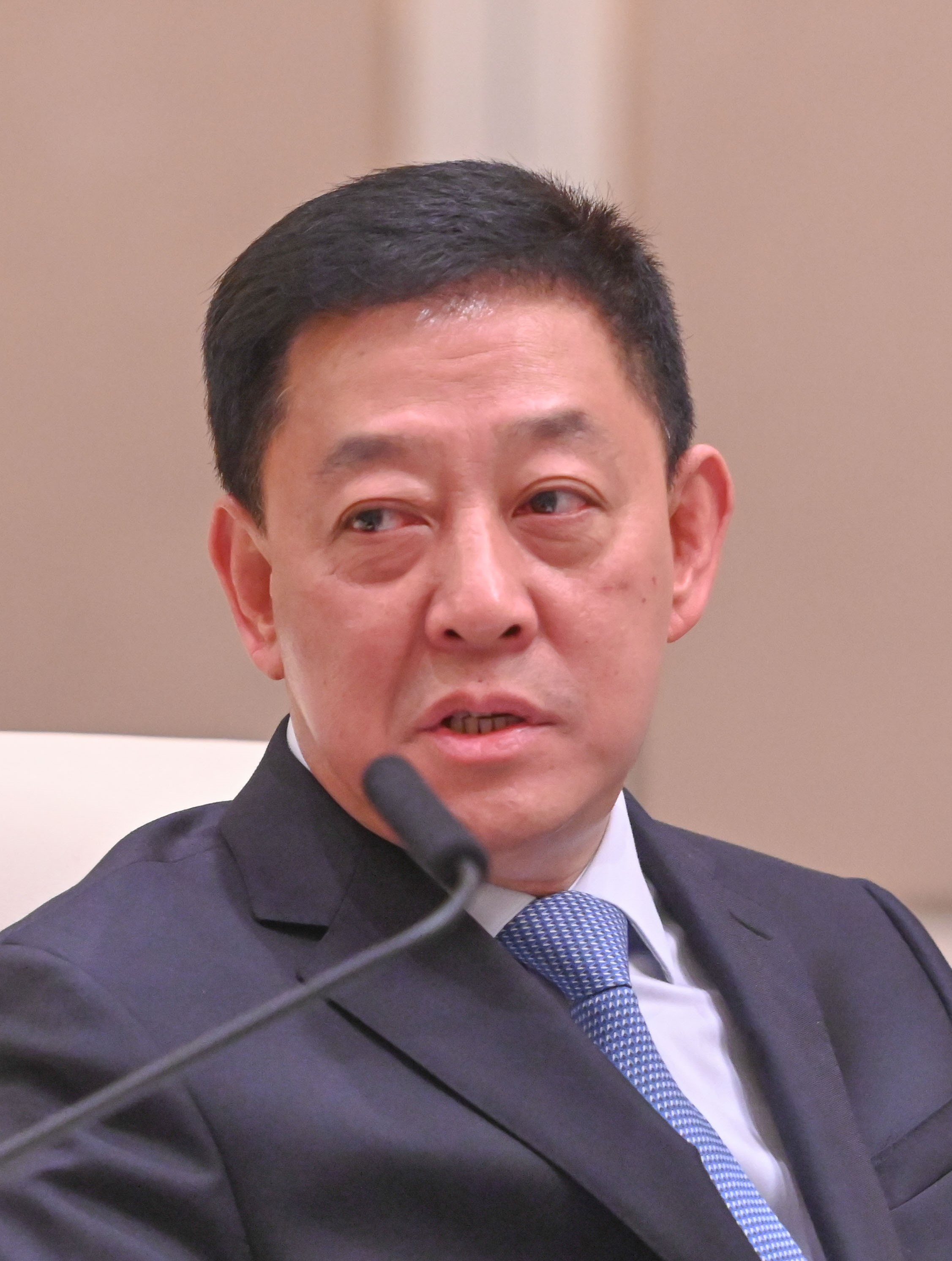
- Hu in 2024

Governor of Jilin
- Incumbent
- Assumed office 2 April 2023
- Preceded by: Han Jun

Specifically-designated Deputy Party Secretary of Liaoning
- In office 30 October 2021 – 1 April 2023
- Party Secretary: Zhang Guoqing; Hao Peng
- Preceded by: Zhou Bo

Personal details
- Born: July 1964 (age 62) Wutai County, Shanxi, China
- Party: Chinese Communist Party
- Education: University of Science and Technology Beijing; Xi'an Jiaotong University; Peking University

Hu Yuting (Chinese: 胡玉亭; pinyin: Hú Yùtíng; born July 1964) is a Chinese executive and politician, currently serving as the governor of Jilin. He was the former party secretary of Dalian and deputy party secretary of Liaoning from 2021 to 2023.

He was a representative of the 19th National Congress of the Chinese Communist Party. He is a representative of the 20th National Congress of the Chinese Communist Party and a member of the 20th Central Committee of the Chinese Communist Party. He is a delegate to the 13th National People's Congress.

== Biography ==
Hu was born in Wutai County, Shanxi, in July 1964. In 1982, he entered Beijing Iron & Steel Industry College (now University of Science and Technology Beijing), where he majored in ferrous metallurgy. He also received his master's degree in engineering from Xi'an Jiaotong University in 2004 and earned his MBA from Guanghua School of Management, Peking University in 2005.

Hu joined the Chinese Communist Party (CCP) in July 1986, nearing graduation. After graduating in 1986, Hu was assigned to the Taiyuan Iron and Steel Group, where he was eventually becoming deputy chief engineer in December 2000 and chief engineer in February 2002. In May 2008, he rose to become general manager and vice chairman, and served for three years.

In July 2011, Hu was appointed vice mayor of Datong and was admitted to member of the Standing Committee of the CCP Datong Municipal Committee, the city's top authority, but having held the position for only half a year. He was party branch secretary of Shanxi Provincial Economic and Information Commission in January 2012, concurrently holding the director position. In July 2013, he was named acting mayor of Jinzhong, confirmed in March 2014. He was promoted to party secretary, the top political position in the city, in July 2016. He was appointed secretary-general of the CCP Shanxi Provincial Committee in January 2018 and was admitted to member of the Standing Committee of the CCP Shanxi Provincial Committee, the province's top authority. He took up the post of vice governor which he held from April 2019 to June 2021, although he remained secretary-general of the CCP Shanxi Provincial Committee until May 2019.

In June 2021, Hu was transferred to the coastal province Liaoning, where he was appointed party secretary of Dalian and was admitted to member of the Standing Committee of the CCP Liaoning Provincial Committee, the province's top authority. In October 2021, he was elevated to deputy party secretary of Liaoning, succeeding Zhou Bo.

Government offices
Preceded by Wu Qinghai	Mayor of Jinzhong; 2013–2016	Succeeded by Wang Cheng
Preceded by Lin Wu	Executive Vice Governor of Shanxi; 2019–2021	Succeeded by Zhang Jifu
Preceded by Han Jun	Governor of Jilin; 2023–present	Incumbent
Party political offices
Preceded by Zhang Pu	Party Secretary of Jinzhong; 2016–2018	Succeeded by Wang Cheng
Preceded by Wang Fu	Secretary-General of the Shanxi Provincial Committee of the Chinese Communist Party; 2018–2019	Succeeded by Lian Yimin
Preceded by Tan Zuojun	Party Secretary of Dalian; 2021–2023	Succeeded by Xiong Maoping
Preceded by Zhou Bo	Specifically-designated Deputy Party Secretary of Liaoning; 2021–2023	Succeeded by TBA
