= Politics of Guizhou =

Politics of a province of China

The politics of Guizhou in the People's Republic of China is structured in a dual party-government system like all other governing institutions in mainland China.

The Governor of Guizhou is the highest-ranking official in the People's Government of Guizhou. However, in the province's dual party-government governing system, the Governor has less power than the Guizhou Chinese Communist Party (CCP) Provincial Committee Secretary, colloquially termed the "Guizhou CCP Party Chief".

== List of provincial-level leaders ==
=== CCP Guizhou Committee Secretaries ===
Image	Name (English)	Name (Chinese)	Term start	Term end	Ref.
	Su Zhenhua	苏振华	February 1949	May 1954	
	Zhou Lin	周林	December 1954	October 1964	
	Li Dazhang	李大章	November 1964	April 1965	
	Jia Qiyun	贾启允	May 1965	January 1967	
	Li Zaihan	李再含	December 1967	October 1969	
	Lan Yinong	蓝亦农	October 1969	September 1973	
	Lu Ruilin	鲁瑞林	September 1973	February 1977	
	Ma Li	马力	February 1977	September 1979	
	Chi Biqing	池必卿	September 1979	March 1985	
	Zhu Houze	朱厚泽	April 1985	July 1985	
	Hu Jintao	胡锦涛	July 1985	December 1988	
	Liu Zhengwei	刘正威	December 1988	July 1993	
	Liu Fangren	刘方仁	July 1993	January 2001	
	Qian Yunlu	钱运录	January 2001	December 2005	
	Shi Zongyuan	石宗源	December 2005	August 2010	
	Li Zhanshu	栗战书	8 August 2010	18 July 2012	
	Zhao Kezhi	赵克志	18 July 2012	31 July 2015	
	Chen Min'er	陈敏尔	31 July 2015	15 July 2017	
	Sun Zhigang	孙志刚	15 July 2017	20 November 2020	
	Shen Yiqin	谌贻琴	20 November 2020	9 December 2022	
	Xu Lin	徐麟	9 December 2022	Incumbent	

=== Chairpersons of Guizhou People's Congress ===
1. Xu Jiansheng (徐健生): 1980–1983
2. Wu Shi (吴实): 1983–1985
3. Zhang Yuhuan (张玉环): 1985–1993
4. Liu Zhengwei (刘正威): January 1993–July 1993
5. Liu Yulin (刘玉林): July 1993 – January 1994
6. Wang Chaowen (王朝文): 1994–1998
7. Liu Fangren (刘方仁): January 1998 – November 2002
8. Qian Yunlu (钱运录): January 2003 – December 2005
9. Shi Zongyuan (石宗源): January 2006 – 2010
10. Li Zhanshu: 2010–2012
11. Zhao Kezhi: 2012–2015
12. Chen Min'er: 2015–2017
13. Sun Zhigang: 2017–2021
14. Shen Yiqin: 2021–2022
15. Xu Lin: 2022–present

=== Governors ===
1. Yang Yong (杨勇): 1949–1954
2. Zhou Lin (周林): 1955–1965
3. Li Li (李立): 1965–1967
4. Li Zaihe (李再合): 1967–1971
5. Lan Yinong (蓝亦农): 1971–1973
6. Lu Ruilin (鲁瑞林): 1973–1977
7. Ma Li (马力): 1977–1979
8. Su Gang (苏钢): 1980–1983
9. Wang Zhaowen (王朝文): 1983–1993
10. Chen Shineng (陈士能): 1993–1996
11. Wu Yixia (吴亦侠): 1996–1998
12. Qian Yunlu (钱运录): 1998–2001
13. Shi Xiushi (石秀诗): 2001–2006
14. Lin Shusen (林树森): 2006–2010
15. Zhao Kezhi: 2010–2012
16. Chen Min'er: 2012–2015
17. Sun Zhigang: 2015–2017
18. Shen Yiqin: 2017–2020
19. Li Bingjun: 2020–present

=== Chairpersons of CPPCC Guizhou Committee ===
1. Shen Yunpu (申云浦): 1955–1956
2. Xu Jiansheng (徐健生): 1956–1959
3. Miao Chunting (苗春亭): 1959–1967
4. Li Baohua (李葆华): 1977–1979
5. Chi Biqing (池必卿): 1979–1980
6. Miao Chunting (苗春亭): 1980–1993
7. Long Zhiyi (龙志毅): 1993–1998
8. Wang Siqi (王思齐): 1998–2006
9. Sun Gan (孙淦): 2006–2007
10. Huang Yao (黄瑶): 2007–2010
11. Wang Zhengfu (王正福): 2010–2013
12. Wang Fuyu (王富玉): 2013–2018
13. Liu Xiaokai (刘晓凯): 2018–present
