= Guizhou Provincial Committee of the Chinese People's Political Consultative Conference =

Guizhou Provincial Committee of the Chinese People's Political Consultative Conference 中国人民政治协商会议贵州省委员会
- 13th
- Emblem of the Chinese People's Political Consultative Conference

Type
- Type: United front organ Constitutional convention (Historical); Legislature (Historical) of Chinese People's Political Consultative Conference

History
- Founded: February 1955; 71 years ago
- Preceded by: Guizhou Provincial People's Congress Consultative Committee

Leadership
- Chairperson: Zhao Yongqing

Website
- www.gzszx.gov.cn

Chinese name
- Simplified Chinese: 中国人民政治协商会议贵州省委员会
- Traditional Chinese: 中國人民政治協商會議貴州省委員會
Transcriptions
Standard Mandarin
- Hanyu Pinyin: Zhōngguó Rénmín Zhèngzhì Xiéshāng Huìyì Guìzhōushěng Wěiyuánhuì

Abbreviation
- Simplified Chinese: 贵州省政协
- Traditional Chinese: 貴州省政協
- Literal meaning: CPPCC Guizhou Provincial Committee
Transcriptions
Standard Mandarin
- Hanyu Pinyin: Guìzhōushěng Zhèngxié

The Guizhou Provincial Committee of the Chinese People's Political Consultative Conference (Chinese: 中国人民政治协商会议贵州省委员会; abbreviation CPPCC Guizhou Provincial Committee) is the provincial advisory body and a local organization of the Chinese People's Political Consultative Conference in Guizhou, China. It is supervised and directed by the Guizhou Provincial Committee of the Chinese Communist Party.

== History ==
The Guizhou Provincial Committee of the Chinese People's Political Consultative Conference traces its origins to the Guizhou Provincial People's Congress Consultative Committee (贵州省各界人民代表会议协商委员会), founded in 1951.

=== Anti-corruption campaign ===
In 2009, Huang Yao was put under investigation for alleged "serious violations of discipline and laws" by the Central Commission for Discipline Inspection (CCDI). In 2010, he was sentenced to death with a two-year reprieve for bribery.

On 21 February 2021, Wang Fuyu was being investigated for "serious violations of laws and regulations" by the Central Commission for Discipline Inspection (CCDI), the party's internal disciplinary body, and the National Supervisory Commission, the highest anti-corruption agency of China. On 17 January 2022, he was sentenced to death with a two-year reprieve for taking bribes worth 450 million yuan ($70.7 million) by Tianjin No. 1 Intermediate People's Court.

== Term ==
=== 1st ===
- Term: February 1955–December 1959
- Chairperson: Shen Yunpu (February 1955–September 1956), Xu Jiansheng (September 1956–December 1959)
- Vice Chairpersons: Xie Xinhe (February 1955–September 1956), Miao Chunting (September 1956–December 1959), Tian Junliang, Chen Tie, Wang Jialie, Shuang Qing
- Secretary-General: Hui Shiru

=== 2nd ===
- Term: December 1959–December 1963
- Chairperson: Miao Chunting
- Vice Chairpersons: Tian Junliang, Chen Tie, Wang Jialie, Shuang Qing, Luo Dengyi
- Secretary-General: Hui Shiru

=== 3rd ===
- Term: December 1963–January 1967
- Chairperson: Miao Chunting
- Vice Chairpersons: Tian Junliang, Chen Tie, Wang Jialie, Shuang Qing, Luo Dengyi, Yang Hanxian
- Secretary-General: Hui Shiru

=== 4th ===
- Term: November 1977–April 1983
- Chairperson: Li Baohua (November 1977–January 1979), Chi Biqing (January 1979–January 1980), Miao Chunting (January 1980–January 1983)
- Vice Chairpersons: Miao Chunting (November 1977–January 1980), Qin Tianzhen (November 1977–January 1980), Dai Xiaodong (November 1977–January 1980), Tian Junliang (November 1977–January 1980), Chen Tie (November 1977–January 1980), Zeng Xianhui (November 1977–January 1980), Jin Feng (November 1977–January 1980), Hui Shiru, Luo Dengyi, Yang Hanxian, Tang Hongren, Meng Sufen, Mao Tiaoqiao, Yuan Jiaji, Sun Hanzhang (January 1980–April 1983), Wang Letting (January 1980–April 1983), Li Xiagong (January 1980–April 1983), Zhu Yuru (January 1980–April 1983), He Peizhen (January 1980–April 1983), Jian Xianai (January 1980–April 1983), Wu Tongming (January 1980–April 1983), Zhang Chaolun (February 1981–April 1983)
- Secretary-General: Chu Zhenmin (November 1977–January 1979), Shi Wenli (January 1979–January 1980), Hui Shiru (concurrently, January 1980–April 1983)

=== 5th ===
- Term: April 1983–January 1988
- Chairperson: Miao Chunting
- Vice Chairpersons: Hui Shiru (April 1983–April 1985), Song Shugong, Li Xiagong, Wang Fuqing, Wang Boxun (April 1983–November 1983), Yang Hanxian, Tang Hongren, He Peizhen, Mao Tiaoqiao, Zhu Yuru, Yuan Jiaji, Jian Xianai, Wang Qingyan, Meng Sufen, Zhang Chaolun, Wang Jingyuan, Chu Zhenmin (April 1985–January 1988)
- Secretary-General: Song Shugong (concurrently, April 1983–April 1986), Wang Siming (April 1986–January 1988)

=== 6th ===
- Term: January 1988–January 1993
- Chairperson: Miao Chunting
- Vice Chairpersons: Song Shugong, Li Xiagong, Wang Fuqing, Tang Hongren, Mao Tiaoqiao, Yuan Jiaji (January 1988–May 1991), Jian Xianai, Wang Qingyan, Meng Sufen, Zhang Chaolun, Wang Jingyuan (January 1988–June 1989), Wang Siming (February 1990–January 1993), Li Renshan (March 1991–January 1993), Qiu Yaoguo (March 1992–January 1993), An Diwei (March 1992–January 1993)
- Secretary-General: Wang Siming

=== 7th ===
- Term: January 1993–January 1998
- Chairperson: Long Zhiyi
- Vice Chairpersons: Wang Siming, Meng Sufen, Zhang Chaolun, Qiu Yaoguo, An Diwei, Li Yuandong, Chang Zheng (January 1993–October 1997), Wang Demao, Wu Ruoqiu, Jiang Xiwen, Wang Yupu, Cheng Tianfu (January 1994–January 1998), Yao Jiyuan (January 1996–January 1998)
- Secretary-General: Wang Siming (January 1993–February 1996), Yang Guanglin (February 1996–January 1998)

=== 8th ===
- Term: January 1998–December 2002
- Chairperson: Wang Siqi
- Vice Chairpersons: Yuan Ronggui, Li Yuandong, Wu Ruoqiu, Cheng Tianfu, Yang Guanglin, Wang Huiye, Wang Zhonggang, Wu Jingbo, Xu Leren, Wu Jiafu
- Secretary-General: Hong Zongliang

=== 9th ===
- Term: January 2003–January 2008
- Chairperson: Sun Gan
- Vice Chairpersons: Liu Yeqiang, Ma Wenjun, Xu Leren, Wu Xiyuan, Li Jinshun, He Yongkang, Li Ping, Li Jiakuan, Wang Lusheng, Xiang Xiaoqing, Tang Shili
- Secretary-General: Hong Zongliang

=== 10th ===
- Term: January 2008–January 2013
- Chairperson: Huang Yao (January 2007–November 2009), Wang Zhengfu (November 2009–January 2013)
- Vice Chairpersons: Kong Lingzhong, Xie Xiaoyao, Wu Jiafu, Liu Hongmao, Chen Haifeng, Yang Yuxue, Zuo Dingchao, Wu Honglin
- Secretary-General: Xia Yiqing

=== 11th ===
- Term: January 2013–January 2018
- Chairperson: Wang Fuyu
- Vice Chairpersons: Chen Haifeng, Kong Lingzhong, Zuo Dingchao, Xie Xiaoyao, Chen Min, Cai Zhijun
- Secretary-General: Li Yuecheng

=== 12th ===
- Term: January 2018–January 2023
- Chairperson: Liu Xiaokai
- Vice Chairpersons: Meng Qiliang (January 2018–January 2021), Zuo Dingchao (–January 2022), Li Hanyu, Zhou Jiankun (January 2020–November 2022, investigated), Luo Ning, Chen Jian, Ren Xiangsheng, Sun Chengyi, Zhang Guangqi, Chen Yan (January 2021–), Zhao Deming (January 2022–), Li Zaiyong (January 2022–)
- Secretary-General: Ren Xiangsheng (January 2018–January 2020) → Xiong Dewei (January 2020–)

=== 13th ===
- Term: January 2023–2028
- Chairperson: Zhao Yongqing
- Vice Chairpersons: Zhao Deming, Li Hanyu, Sun Chengyi, Zhang Guangqi, Chen Yan (–March 2024), Tang Dezhi (–August 2025, investigated), Li Jian, Ran Xia, Shi Huaqing (January 2025–), Sun Fa (January 2025–)
- Secretary-General: Xiong Dewei (–July 2023) → Zhang Xin (–January 2024)
