= Xiang Chengqiang =

Chinese politician

- 向承强

Governor of Qiannan Buyei and Miao Autonomous Prefecture
- In office February 2024 – 1 August 2025
- Party Secretary: Tang Dezhi
- Preceded by: Zhong Yang

Personal details
- Born: April 1970 (age 56) Zheng'an County, Guizhou, China
- Party: Chinese Communist Party
- Education: Party School of the CCP Guizhou Provincial Committee

Chinese name
- Simplified Chinese: 向承强
- Traditional Chinese: 向承強
Transcriptions
Standard Mandarin
- Hanyu Pinyin: Xiàng Chéngqiáng

Xiang Chengqiang (Chinese: 向承强; born April 1970) is a former Chinese politician of Miao ethnicity who spent his entire career in southwest China's Guizhou province. As of August 2025 he was under investigation by China's top anti-graft watchdog. Previously he served as governor of Qiannan Buyei and Miao Autonomous Prefecture.

== Early life and education ==
Xiang was born in Zheng'an County, Guizhou, in April 1970, and graduated from the Party School of the CCP Guizhou Provincial Committee.

== Career ==
Xiang got involved in politics in September 1991, when he became an official in the town of Zhongguan in his home-county.

Starting in June 1993, Xiang served in several posts in towns and townships of Daozhen Gelao and Miao Autonomous County, including deputy director, deputy party secretary, township leader, and party secretary.

In November 2000, Xiang became deputy secretary of the Zunyi Municipal Committee of the Communist Youth League of China. He was appointed deputy magistrate of Fenggang County in January 2003 and in September 2006 was admitted to standing committee member of the CCP Fenggang County Committee, the county's top authority.

Xiang was transferred back to Daozhen Gelao and Miao Autonomous County as deputy party secretary in December 2010, in addition to serving as magistrate in January 2011.

Xiang was elevated to party secretary of Xishui County in October 2015, concurrently serving as secretary of the Party Working Committee of Xishui Economic Development Zone.

Xiang was chosen as executive vice mayor of Zunyi in September 2021 and was admitted to standing committee member of the CCP Zunyi Municipal Committee, the city's top authority.

In November 2023, Xiang was named acting governor of Qiannan Buyei and Miao Autonomous Prefecture, confirmed in February 2024. He also served as deputy party secretary.

=== Downfall ===
On 1 August 2025, Xiang was suspected of "serious violations of laws and regulations" by the Central Commission for Discipline Inspection (CCDI), the party's internal disciplinary body, and the National Supervisory Commission, the highest anti-corruption agency of China. He is the fifth governor in Qiannan Buyei and Miao Autonomous Prefecture to be investigated by China's anti-corruption watchdog, after Li Yuecheng (January 2020), Xiang Hongqiong (March 2022), Zhong Yang (April 2023), and Wu Shenghua (July 2025).

Government offices
Preceded by Wang Zhaolun (汪朝伦)	Magistrate of Daozhen Gelao and Miao Autonomous County; 2011–2015	Succeeded by Yang Runmin (杨润民)
Preceded by Zhong Yang	Governor of Qiannan Buyei and Miao Autonomous Prefecture; 2024–2025	Succeeded by TBA
Party political offices
Preceded by Zhou Zhou (周舟)	Communist Party Secretary of Xishui County; 2015–2021	Succeeded by Chang Wensong (常文松)
