= Wang Chaowen =

Chinese politician (born 1930)

- 王朝文

Chairperson of the National People's Congress Ethnic Affairs Committee
- In office March 1993 – March 2003
- Preceded by: Ngapoi Ngawang Jigme
- Succeeded by: Doje Cering

Chairman of Guizhou Provincial People's Congress
- In office January 1994 – January 1998
- Preceded by: Liu Zhengwei
- Succeeded by: Liu Fangren

Governor of Guizhou
- In office April 1983 – January 1993
- Party Secretary: Chi Biqing; Zhu Houze; Hu Jintao; Liu Zhengwei
- Preceded by: Su Gang
- Succeeded by: Chen Shineng

Personal details
- Born: October 1930 (age 95) Huangping County, Guizhou, China
- Party: Chinese Communist Party

Wang Chaowen (Chinese: 王朝文; pinyin: Wáng Cháowén; born October 1930) is a Chinese politician of Miao ethnicity who served as governor of Guizhou from 1983 to 1993 and chairman of Guizhou Provincial People's Congress from 1994 to 1998.

He was a member of the 12th, 13th and 14th Central Committee of the Chinese Communist Party. He was a member of the Standing Committee of the 8th and 9th National People's Congress.

== Biography ==
Wang was born in Huangping County, Guizhou, in October 1930. He entered the workforce in December 1949, and joined the Chinese Communist Party (CCP) in July 1951. He was first party secretary of Shibing County in September 1956, and held that office until January 1960. He served as deputy secretary of Guizhou Provincial Committee of the Communist Youth League of China in February 1960, and was promoted to the secretary position in June 1973. In 1966, the Cultural Revolution broke out, he was removed from office and effectively sidelined, but soon reinstated in December 1969. In September 1977, he was admitted to member of the Standing Committee of the CCP Guizhou Provincial Committee, the province's top authority. In January 1980, he became vice governor of Guizhou, rising to governor in April 1983. He also served as deputy party secretary from March 1985 to November 1993. In January 1994, he became chairman of Guizhou Provincial People's Congress, a post he kept until January 1998. In March 1998, he took office as chairperson of the National People's Congress Ethnic Affairs Committee, serving in the post until his retirement in March 2003.

Government offices
Preceded by Su Gang	Governor of Guizhou; 1983–1993	Succeeded by Chen Shineng
Assembly seats
Preceded by Liu Zhengwei	Chairman of Guizhou Provincial People's Congress; 1994–1998	Succeeded by Liu Fangren
Preceded by Ngapoi Ngawang Jigme	Chairperson of the National People's Congress Ethnic Affairs Committee; 1993–2003	Succeeded by Doje Cering
