= Chen Zenggu =

Chinese politician (1907–1988)

- 陈曾固

Chairman of the Consultative Committee of the Guizhou Provincial People's Congress of All Ethnic Groups and Communities
- In office July 1951 – July 1955
- Preceded by: New title
- Succeeded by: Shen Yunpu

Personal details
- Born: Chen Wenguang; 1907 Anshun County, Guizhou, Qing China
- Died: 1988 (aged 80–81) Beijing, China
- Party: Chinese Communist Party
- Education: Beijing Chaoyang University

Chinese name
- Simplified Chinese: 陈曾固
- Traditional Chinese: 陳曾固
Transcriptions
Standard Mandarin
- Hanyu Pinyin: Chén Zēnggù

Courtesy name
- Chinese: 俊明
Transcriptions
Standard Mandarin
- Hanyu Pinyin: Jùnmíng

Birth name
- Simplified Chinese: 陈文光
- Traditional Chinese: 陳文光
Transcriptions
Standard Mandarin
- Hanyu Pinyin: Chén Wénguāng

Former name
- Simplified Chinese: 陈镜明
- Traditional Chinese: 陳鏡明
Transcriptions
Standard Mandarin
- Hanyu Pinyin: Chén Jìngmíng

Pseudonym
- Chinese: 曾一峰
Transcriptions
Standard Mandarin
- Hanyu Pinyin: Zēng Yīfēng

Pseudonym
- Chinese: 曾固
Transcriptions
Standard Mandarin
- Hanyu Pinyin: Zēng Gù

Chen Zenggu (1907 - February 29, 1988, Chinese: 陈曾固), previously referred to as Chen Wenguang and Junming, and formerly known as Chen Jingming, Zeng Yifeng, and Zenggu, was a politician in the People's Republic of China.

== Biography ==
Born into a family of modest merchants in Xiaoyuan Village, Jiaozi Mountain, Anshun County, Guizhou (currently Jiaozishan Town, Xixiu District, Anshun City), Chen enrolled in Anshun County High School in 1921. Following the onset of the May Thirtieth Movement in 1925, he actively engaged in organizing the Anshun High School Students' Salvation Federation, participating in street propaganda and delivering speeches. In the autumn of 1925, he was accepted into the preparatory course at Chaoyang University in Beijing, subsequently entering the Department of Economics, and joined the Beijing branch of the League of China's Left-Wing Social Scientists in 1929. In 1930, he taught at Beiping Liming Middle School and participated in the revolution; in November 1931, he joined the Chinese Communist Party (CCP) and assumed the role of head of the organization department of the Beiping Social Union. In November 1931, he became a member of the CCP and assumed the role of head of the Organization Department of the Beiping Federation of Social Scientists, as well as the secretary of the Party League of the Federation. From December 1932 to May 1933, he served as the secretary of the Beiping East District Committee of the CCP, and from May to July 1933, he held the position of acting secretary of the Beiping Municipal Committee of the CCP and head of the Organization Department. In July 1933, he was apprehended by the Third Regiment of the Military Police due to an informant's betrayal and subsequently condemned to life imprisonment. In August 1933, he was transferred to the Central Soldiers' Prison in Nanjing to fulfill his sentence.

In September 1937, during the Second Sino-Japanese War, he was liberated from prison by the Nanjing Office of the Eighth Route Army and then traveled to Yan'an. Upon completing his education at the Central Party School, he held the positions of secretary and director of the General Branch of the Cadre Training Course within the Organization Department of the CCP Central Committee, as well as secretary-general of the Finance and Economics Department of the CCP Central Committee, starting in 1938. From April to June 1945, he served as an alternate delegate for the CCP Central Committee and the CCP Military Committee at the 7th National Congress of the Chinese Communist Party.

In December 1945, he was appointed to the Standing Committee of the Liaosi Provincial Committee and served as Minister of Organization. In June 1946, he became a member of the Standing Committee of the Liaoji Provincial Committee and continued as Minister of Organization. From February to April 1947, he held the position of Secretary General of the Liaoji Provincial Committee, and from June to July, he served as Minister of the Urban Engineering Department of the Liaoji Provincial Committee. In July 1948, he assumed the role of Minister of Organization for the Liaobei Provincial Committee and President of the Party School of the Provincial Party Committee. In November 1948, he was appointed to the Standing Committee and became Deputy Secretary of the Liaobei Provincial Committee. In November 1948, he was appointed as a member of the Standing Committee and Deputy Secretary of the Liaobei Provincial Committee. In February 1949, he led a delegation of cadres from Liaobei Province southward and subsequently became deputy secretary of the CCP Wuhan Municipal Committee.

In November 1949, Chen Zenggu was appointed deputy director of the Military Control Committee of Guiyang City of the People's Liberation Army (PLA) and served as the second deputy secretary of the Guizhou Provincial Committee from November to December 1949. He held the position of deputy secretary of the CCP Guizhou Provincial Committee from December 1949 to November 1952, and concurrently served as vice-chairman of the People's Government of Guizhou and a member of the Committee for Overseas Chinese Affairs from December 1949 to December 1954. Additionally, he was vice-chairman of the People's Government of Guizhou and a member of the Committee for Overseas Chinese Affairs from January 1950 to June 1952, while also serving as deputy secretary of the CCP Provincial Committee of Guizhou. From January 1950 to June 1952, he served as the head of the Organization Department of the CCP Guizhou Provincial Committee; from June 1950 to March 1953, he was a member of the Southwest Military and Political Committee; from July 1950 to February 1951, he led the Guizhou Provincial People's Supervisory Committee; from June 1951 to March 1955, he was the deputy head of the Guizhou Provincial Finance and Economic Commission; and from July 1951 to February 1955, he served as the deputy head of the Guizhou Provincial People's Consultative Conference of the First People's Conference of All Races and Branches. From September 1951 to November 1952, he served as Deputy Secretary of the Party Group of the Guizhou Provincial People's Government; from November 1952 to May 1954, he held the positions of Secretary of the Party Group of the Government and First Deputy Secretary of the CCP Guizhou Provincial Committee (until December 1954); from January 1953 to November 1954, he was also a member of the Southwest Administrative Committee.

In October 1954, he assumed the role of Vice Minister of Education of the People's Republic of China, overseeing primary and secondary education. In January 1955, he additionally became deputy secretary of the Party Group of the Ministry, responsible for planning and finance. In 1956, he was elected as a delegate to the 8th National Congress of the Chinese Communist Party and became an alternate member of the 8th Central Committee of the Chinese Communist Party. In June 1958, he joined the standing committee of the CCP Committee of Gansu Province and served as a member of the secretariat of the committee. Following his rehabilitation during the Cultural Revolution, he reinstated his party membership and professional duties, subsequently serving as an advisor to the Ministry of Education and as a member of the Legislative Affairs Committee of the National People's Congress after 1979.

On February 29, 1988, Chen Zenggu died.

Assembly seats
New title	Chairman of the Consultative Committee of the Guizhou Provincial People's Congress of All Ethnic Groups and Communities; 1951–1955	Succeeded by Shen Yunpu
