= Zhong Yang =

Chinese politician

- 钟阳

Governor of Qiannan Buyei and Miao Autonomous Prefecture
- In office March 2021 – April 2023
- Party Secretary: Tang Dezhi
- Preceded by: Wu Shenghua
- Succeeded by: Xiang Chengqiang

Personal details
- Born: January 1972 (age 54) Ji'an, Jiangxi, China
- Party: Chinese Communist Party (1994–2024; expelled)
- Education: Southwest Minzu University; Central Party School of the Chinese Communist Party

Chinese name
- Simplified Chinese: 钟阳
- Traditional Chinese: 鐘陽
Transcriptions
Standard Mandarin
- Hanyu Pinyin: Zhōng Yáng

Zhong Yang (Chinese: 钟阳; born January 1972) is a former Chinese politician of Bouyei ethnicity who spent her entire career in her home-province Guizhou. She was investigated by China's top anti-graft agency in April 2023. Previously she served as governor of Qiannan Buyei and Miao Autonomous Prefecture.

She was a delegate to the 14th National People's Congress.

== Early life and education ==
Zhong was born in Ji'an, Jiangxi, in January 1972. In 1990, she was accepted to Southwest Minzu University, where she majored in history.

== Career ==
Zhong joined the Chinese Communist Party (CCP) in May 1994, and got involved in politics in July 1994, when she was assigned to the Organization Department of Guiyang Municipal Committee of the Communist Youth League of China. In June 2005, she became secretary General of the CCP Guiyang Municipal Committee. She became magistrate of Xifeng County in October 2011, and then party secretary, the top political position in the county, beginning in January 2014. She was appointed secretary of the Party Working Committee of Guiyang National Economic and Technological Development Zone in October 2015, concurrently serving as secretary of CCP Huaxi District Committee and member of the Party Working Committee of Gui'an New Area. She was vice governor of Qiannan Buyei and Miao Autonomous Prefecture in December 2018 and subsequently executive vice governor in December 2019. She was elevated to governor in March 2021.

== Investigation ==
On 18 April 2023, she was suspected of "serious violations of laws and regulations" by the Central Commission for Discipline Inspection (CCDI), the party's internal disciplinary body, and the National Supervisory Commission, the highest anti-corruption agency of China. On 28 July 2024, the Qiannan Prefecture People's Congress officially removed Zhong from her position as a representative of the 14th Guizhou Provincial People's Congress. Following this, on 1 September, the Standing Committee of the Guizhou Provincial People's Congress terminated her qualifications as a representative of the 14th National People's Congress.

Earlier, on 20 January 2024, a documentary jointly produced by the Guizhou Provincial Commission for Discipline Inspection and Guizhou Provincial Radio and Television Station exposed her misconduct. On 29 January, Zhong's trial commenced at the Zunyi Intermediate People's Court. The Zunyi City People's Procuratorate presented charges against her, alleging that between 2010 and 2021, she abused her authority in various roles—including deputy secretary, county magistrate, and governor—to facilitate agreements, project contracts, and fund allocations for personal benefit. She was accused of accepting over ¥58.96 million in bribes, though ¥29 million was not fully obtained. During the trial, evidence was presented, cross-examinations were conducted, and both sides presented their arguments. Zhong made a final statement in court, pleaded guilty, and the court adjourned to announce the verdict at a later date.

On July 29, the Zunyi Intermediate People's Court delivered its judgment. Zhong was sentenced to 13 years in prison for bribery and fined ¥1 million. Additionally, her illegally obtained assets were confiscated and handed over to the state treasury, with further recovery efforts ongoing. On August 31, the Fifth Plenary Session of the 13th CCP Guizhou Provincial Committee confirmed the decision by the Provincial Party Committee Standing Committee to expel her from the Chinese Communist Party. On September 1, she was stripped of his posts within the CCP and in the public office.

As of August 2025, five governors of Qiannan Buyi and Miao Autonomous Prefecture were investigated, in order of the date of investigation: Li Yuecheng (January 2020), Xiang Hongqiong (March 2022), Zhong Yang (April 2023), Wu Shenghua (July 2025), and Xiang Chengqiang (August 2025).

Government offices
Preceded by Wu Shenghua	Governor of Qiannan Buyei and Miao Autonomous Prefecture; 2021–2023	Succeeded by Xiang Chengqiang
