= Huang Yi =

Huang Yi may refer to:

- Huang Yi (Qing dynasty) (1744–1802), painter and seal carver
- Huang Yi (author) (1952–2017), author of Wuxia novels
- Huang Yi (actress) (born 1979), Chinese actress and singer
- Huang Yi (politician) (born 1958), Chinese politician
- Huang Yi (choreographer) (born 1983), Taiwanese dancer and choreographer

== See also ==
- Timothy Wong Yik (黃翊 Huáng Yì), a Hong Kong singer and actor
