= Ding Jing =

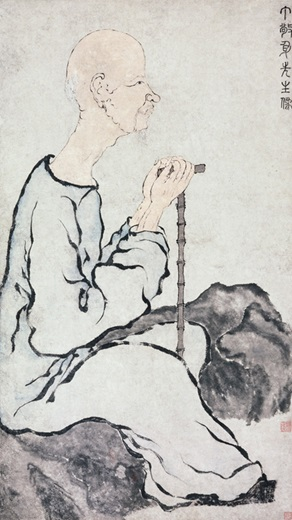
Portrait of Ding Jing by Luo Ping, c. 1762

Ding Jing (Chinese: 丁敬) (1695–1765), aka Ding Jingshen was a Chinese calligrapher, painter, and seal artist.

Ding was born in Qiantang (now Hangzhou). His earlier works show the influence of Wen Peng and He Zhen, but he soon developed his own style and together with several of his students founded the Zhejiang School (or simply Zhe School) of seal carving. This style of carving focused on revitalising the art by adopting older, simpler Han dynasty characters. His founding of this school made him the most notable seal carver in Qiantang, and the school itself was patronised by courtiers such as Ruan Yuan and Weng Fanggang. Together with the seven students who helped him create the school (these being Jiang Ren (蒋仁), Huang Yi (黄易), Xi Gang (奚冈), Chen Yuzhong (陈豫钟), Chen Hongshou (陈鸿寿), Zhao Zhishen (赵之琛), and Qian Song (钱松)), Ding was known as one of the Eight Masters of Xiling.

As well as the scholars noted above, Ding was also a close associate of the painter Luo Ping, and carved a number of seals for him.

== Examples of Ding's seals ==
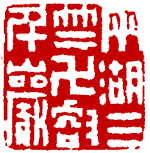

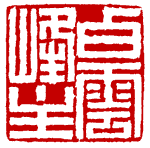

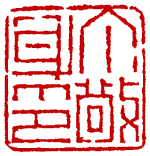

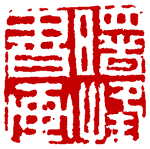

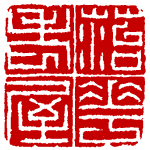
