= Yunnan Provincial Committee of the Chinese People's Political Consultative Conference =

Yunnan Provincial Committee of the Chinese People's Political Consultative Conference 中国人民政治协商会议云南省委员会
- 13th
- Emblem of the Chinese People's Political Consultative Conference

Type
- Type: United front organ Constitutional convention (Historical); Legislature (Historical) of Chinese People's Political Consultative Conference

History
- Founded: February 21, 1955; 71 years ago
- Preceded by: Yunnan Provincial People's Congress Consultative Committee

Leadership
- Chairperson: Liu Xiaokai

Website
- www.ynzx.gov.cn

Chinese name
- Simplified Chinese: 中国人民政治协商会议云南省委员会
- Traditional Chinese: 中國人民政治協商會議陝西省委員會
Transcriptions
Standard Mandarin
- Hanyu Pinyin: Zhōngguó Rénmín Zhèngzhì Xiéshāng Huìyì Yúnnánshěng Wěiyuánhuì

Abbreviation
- Simplified Chinese: 云南省政协
- Traditional Chinese: 云南省政協
- Literal meaning: CPPCC YunnanProvincial Committee
Transcriptions
Standard Mandarin
- Hanyu Pinyin: Shǎanxīshěng Zhèngxié

The Yunnan Provincial Committee of the Chinese People's Political Consultative Conference (Chinese: 中国人民政治协商会议云南省委员会) is the advisory body and a local organization of the Chinese People's Political Consultative Conference in Yunnan, China. It is supervised and directed by the Yunnan Provincial Committee of the Chinese Communist Party.

== History ==
The Yunnan Provincial Committee of the Chinese People's Political Consultative Conference traces its origins to the Yunnan Provincial People's Congress Consultative Committee (云南省各界人民代表会议协商委员会), founded in 1949.

=== Anti-corruption campaign ===
On 24 March 2022, vice chairperson Huang Yi was put under investigation for alleged "serious violations of discipline and laws" by the Central Commission for Discipline Inspection (CCDI), the party's internal disciplinary body, and the National Supervisory Commission, the highest anti-corruption agency of China. On 4 July 2023, Huang was sentenced to 13 years in prison and fined 3 million yuan for bribery.

== Term ==
=== 1st ===
- Term: February 1955 - July 1959
- Chairperson: Xie Fuzhi
- Vice Chairpersons: Yu Yichuan (March 1958), Zhang Chong, Bai Xiaosong, Zheng Dun (March 1958), Chen Fang (March 1958), Su Honggang, Li Zhuoan (– March 1958), Xie Chongwen (– March 1958), You Yunlong, Cun Shusheng (April 1956 – ), Sun Yuting (March 1958 – ), Wang Shaoyan (March 1958 – )
- Secretary-General: Li Qunjie (– March 1958)

=== 2nd ===
- Term: July 1959 - December 1963
- Chairperson: Liu Minghui
- Vice Chairpersons: Sun Yuting, Liu Linyuan, Cun Shusheng, Wang Shaoyan, You Yunlong, Zhang Tianfang, Dao Jingban, Wu Zhiyuan (June 1960 – )
- Secretary-General: Tang Dengmin

=== 3rd ===
- Term: January 1964 - December 1977
- Chairperson: Yan Hongyan
- Vice Chairpersons: Zhao Jianmin, Sun Yuting, Cun Shusheng, Dao Jingban, Wu Zhiyuan, Zhao Zhongqi, Long Zehui, Zhang Zizhai, Qu Zhongxiang, Hu Zhonghua
- Secretary-General: Zhou Ren

=== 4th ===
- Term: December 1977 - April 1983
- Chairperson: An Pingsheng → Li Qiming (December 1979 – )
- Vice Chairpersons: Wu Zhiyuan, Sun Yuting, Zhao Jianmin, Wu Zuomin, Liu Piyun, Li Woru, Cun Shusheng, Zhang Tianfang, Wang Shaoyan, Long Zehui, Zhang Zizhai, Chen Fang, Qu Zhongxiang, Li Hecai, Dao Dongting, Si Lashan, Zhu Jiabi (December 1979 – ), Wang Jiesan (December 1979 – ), Gu Youzhen (December 1979 – ), Yang Ming (December 1979 – ), Wang Qiming (December 1979 – ), Xiang Chaozong (December 1979 – ), Zhang Xiangshi (December 1979 – ), Ma Huiting (December 1979 – ), Bao Hongzhong (December 1979 – ), Jin Qiongying (December 1979 – ), Wu Jizhang (June 1980 – )
- Secretary-General: Wu Zhiyuan (concurrently) → He Xiaoguang (December 1979 – )

=== 5th ===
- Term: April 1983 - April 1988
- Chairperson: Zhu Jiabi (August 1985) → Liang Jia (August 1985 – )
- Vice Chairpersons: Liang Jia, Wang Jiesan (August 1985), Long Zehui, Yang Kecheng, Qu Zhongxiang, Zeng Yusheng (August 1985), Yang Ming, Wang Qiming (August 1985), Huang Ping, Xiang Chaozong, Zhang Xiangshi, Ma Huiting, Bao Hongzhong, Jin Qiongying, Yang Yitang (August 1985 – , February 1987), Yang Chunzhou (August 1985 – ), Dao Shixun (August 1985 – ), Yang Weijun (August 1985 – ), Chen Shengnian (February 1987 – )
- Secretary-General: Yang Yitang (November 1986) → Zhang Ping (February 1987 – ) → Li Diany (February 1990 – )

=== 6th ===
- Term: May 1988 - April 1993
- Chairperson: Liu Shusheng
- Vice Chairpersons: Liang Lin, Yang Kecheng, Qu Zhongxiang, Zhang Xiangshi, Li Jin, Xiang Chaozong, Ma Huiting, Bao Hongzhong, Yang Chunzhou, Dao Shixun, Yang Weijun, Luo Yuntong (March 1991 – ), Liu Bangrui (March 1992 – ), Zhu Yinggeng (March 1992 – )
- Secretary-General: Zhang Ping

=== 7th ===
- Term: April 1993 - January 1998
- Chairperson: Liu Shusheng
- Vice Chairpersons: Zhao Tingguang, Dao Shixun, Li Jin, Chen Liying, Xiang Chaozong, Li Linge, Li Mingde, Zhu Yinggeng, Liu Bangrui, Lu Bangzheng, Wang Zhaomin, Ma Kaixian, Lang Dazhong (February 1994 – ), Jiangba Jicai (February 1996 – )
- Secretary-General: Li Mingde (concurrently) → Han Long (February 1996 – )

=== 8th ===
- Term: January 1998 - January 2003
- Chairperson: Linghu An (– October 2001) → Yang Chonghui
- Vice Chairpersons: Zhao Shumin, Meng Jiyao, Dao Shixun, Xiang Chaozong, He Zhanjun, Mai Ciqiu, Wang Zhaomin, Ma Kaixian, Jiangba Jicai, Zhang Xuewen, Xu Kemin
- Secretary-General:

=== 9th ===
- Term: January 2003 - January 2008
- Chairperson: Yang Chonghui
- Vice Chairpersons: Meng Jiyao, He Zhanjun, Ma Kaixian, Xu Kemin, Chen Xunru, Su Zhengguo, Guan Guozhong, Zeng Hua, Luo Lihui, Li Xianyou
- Secretary-General:

=== 10th ===
- Term: January 2008 - January 2013
- Chairperson: Wang Xueren
- Vice Chairpersons: Guan Guozhong, Ma Kaixian, Chen Xunru, Zeng Hua, Luo Lihui, Wang Xuezhi, Bai Chengliang, Gu Boping, Ni Huifang
- Secretary-General:

=== 11th ===
- Term: January 2013 - January 2018
- Chairperson: Luo Zhengfu
- Vice Chairpersons: Bai Chengliang, Ma Kaixian, Zeng Hua, Luo Lihui, Gu Boping (January 2014), Ni Huifang, Mi Dongsheng (– January 2016), Wang Chengcai, Yu Dingcheng, Yang Jiawu (January 2015 – ), Ding Shaoxiang (January 2016 – ), Li Jiang (January 2017 – ), Huang Yi (January 2017 – )
- Secretary-General: Che Zhimin (January 2016) → Liu Jianhua (January 2016 – )

=== 12th ===
- Term: January 2018 - January 2023
- Chairperson: Li Jiang
- Vice Chairpersons: Yang Jiawu, Huang Yi (– January 2022), Gao Feng, Yu Dingcheng, Li Zhengyang, Chen Yuhou, Xu Bin, He Bo, Dong Hua (January 2021 – ), Tong Zhiyun (January 2021 – ), Zhao Jin (January 2022 – ), Cheng Lianyuan (January 2022 – ), Li Xuelin (January 2022 – )
- Secretary-General: Liu Jianhua (– May 2020) → Zhang Rongming (May 2020 – )

=== 13th ===
- Term: January 2023 - 2028
- Chairperson: Liu Xiaokai
- Vice Chairpersons: Zhao Jin, Gao Feng, Chen Yuhou, He Lianghui, Li Malin, He Bo, Tong Zhiyun, Li Xuelin, Wang Yizhi, Zhang Kuanshou, Yang Ning (January 2024 – )
- Secretary-General: Zhang Rongming
