= Party Secretary of Guizhou =

Provincial government position in China

Secretary of the Guizhou Provincial Committee of the Chinese Communist Party
- 中国共产党贵州省委员会书记
- Emblem of the Chinese Communist Party

- Flag of the Chinese Communist Party

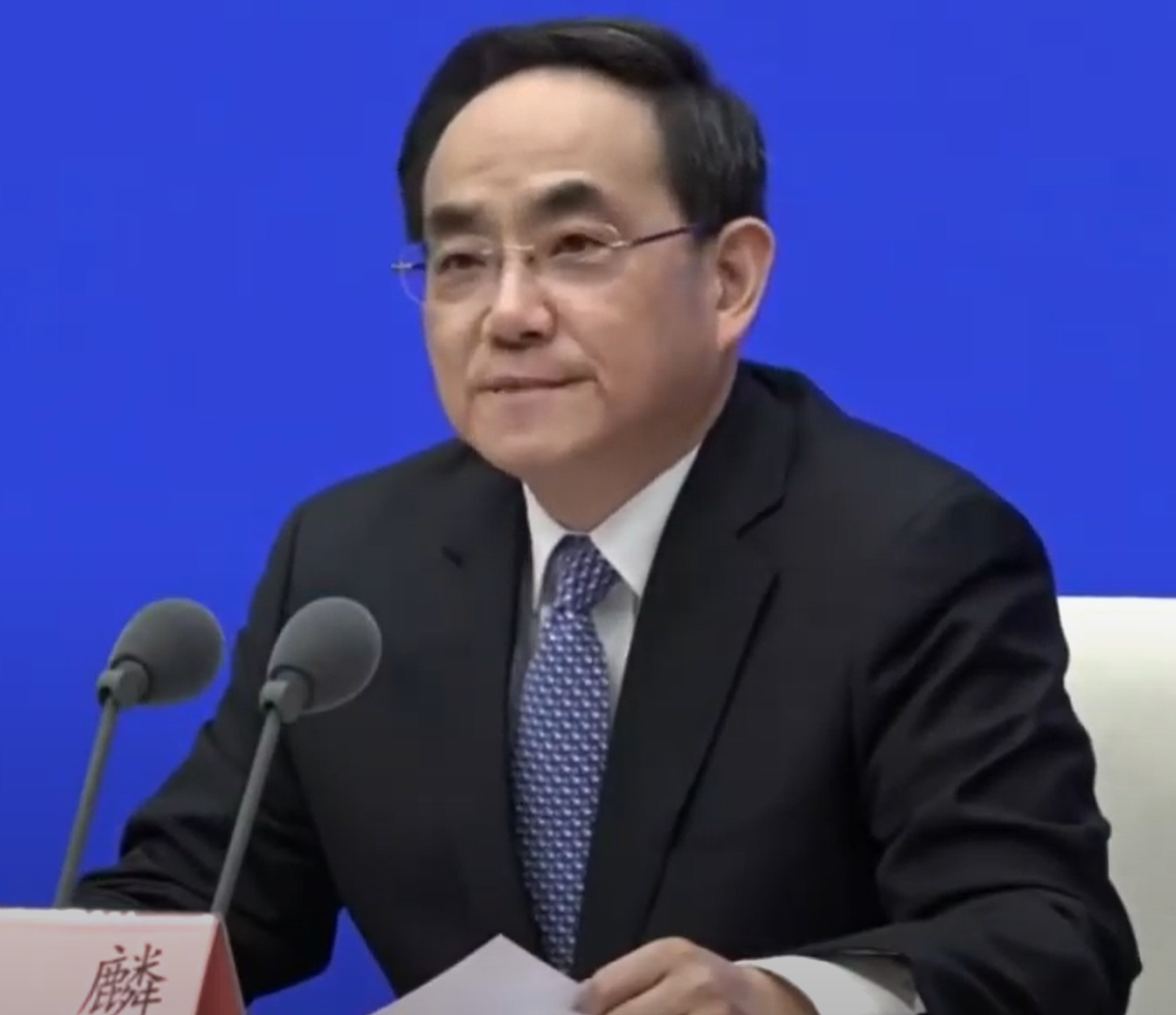
- Incumbent; Xu Lin since 9 December 2022
- Guizhou Provincial Committee of the Chinese Communist Party
- Type: Party Committee Secretary
- Status: Provincial and ministerial-level official
- Nominator: Central Committee
- Appointer: Guizhou Provincial Committee; Central Committee
- Inaugural holder: Su Zhenhua
- Formation: February 1949
- Deputy: Deputy Secretary; Secretary-General

The secretary of the Guizhou Provincial Committee of the Chinese Communist Party is the leader of the Guizhou Provincial Committee of the Chinese Communist Party (CCP). As the CCP is the sole ruling party of the People's Republic of China (PRC), the secretary is the highest ranking post in Guizhou.

The secretary is officially appointed by the CCP Central Committee based on the recommendation of the CCP Organization Department, which is then approved by the Politburo and its Standing Committee. The secretary can be also appointed by a plenary meeting of the Guizhou Provincial Committee, but the candidate must be the same as the one approved by the central government. The secretary leads the Standing Committee of the Guizhou Provincial Committee, and is usually a member of the CCP Central Committee. The secretary leads the work of the Provincial Committee and its Standing Committee. The secretary is outranks the governor, who is generally the deputy secretary of the committee.

The current secretary is Xu Lin, who took office on 9 December 2022.

== List of party secretaries ==
Image	Name (English)	Name (Chinese)	Term start	Term end	Ref.
	Su Zhenhua	苏振华	February 1949	May 1954	
	Zhou Lin	周林	December 1954	October 1964	
	Li Dazhang	李大章	November 1964	April 1965	
	Jia Qiyun	贾启允	May 1965	January 1967	
	Li Zaihan	李再含	December 1967	October 1969	
	Lan Yinong	蓝亦农	October 1969	September 1973	
	Lu Ruilin	鲁瑞林	September 1973	February 1977	
	Ma Li	马力	February 1977	September 1979	
	Chi Biqing	池必卿	September 1979	March 1985	
	Zhu Houze	朱厚泽	April 1985	July 1985	
	Hu Jintao	胡锦涛	July 1985	December 1988	
	Liu Zhengwei	刘正威	December 1988	July 1993	
	Liu Fangren	刘方仁	July 1993	January 2001	
	Qian Yunlu	钱运录	January 2001	December 2005	
	Shi Zongyuan	石宗源	December 2005	August 2010	
	Li Zhanshu	栗战书	8 August 2010	18 July 2012	
	Zhao Kezhi	赵克志	18 July 2012	31 July 2015	
	Chen Min'er	陈敏尔	31 July 2015	15 July 2017	
	Sun Zhigang	孙志刚	15 July 2017	20 November 2020	
	Shen Yiqin	谌贻琴	20 November 2020	9 December 2022	
	Xu Lin	徐麟	9 December 2022	Incumbent	
