= Yan Jianhong =

Chinese politician

Yan Jianhong (Chinese: 阎健宏; 1932 – 16 January 1995) was a Chinese politician who was executed in 1995 for corruption. She had been deputy director and deputy secretary of the Guizhou Provincial Planning Commission, a former member of the Standing Committee of the Guizhou Provincial Political Consultative Conference, and former chairman of the Guizhou International Trust and Investment Corporation.

Reportedly, she refused to kneel at her execution, saying "I have not knelt since China's liberation", and was shot in the back of the head while standing.

Her husband was Liu Zhengwei, Communist Party Secretary of Guizhou Province.
