= Tang Dezhi =

Chinese politician

- 唐德智

Vice Chairperson of the Guizhou Provincial Committee of the Chinese People's Political Consultative Conference
- In office October 2024 – August 2025
- Chairperson: Zhao Yongqing

Communist Party Secretary of Qiannan Buyei and Miao Autonomous Prefecture
- In office May 2017 – October 2024
- Governor: Wu Shenghua; Zhong Yang; Xiang Chengqiang
- Preceded by: Long Changchun
- Succeeded by: Hong Hupeng

Personal details
- Born: July 1965 (age 61) Guiyang, Guizhou, China
- Party: Chinese Communist Party (1995-2026, expelled)
- Education: Renmin University of China

Tang Dezhi (Chinese: 唐德智; pinyin: Táng Dézhì; born July 1965) is a former Chinese politician who spent his entire career in southwest China's Guizhou province. He was investigated by China's top anti-graft agency in August 2025. Previously he served as vice chairperson of the Guizhou Provincial Committee of the Chinese People's Political Consultative Conference. He was a representative of the 20th National Congress of the Chinese Communist Party.

== Early life and education ==
Tang was born in Guiyang, Guizhou, in July 1965, while his ancestral home in Mianyang, Sichuan. In 1981, he enrolled at the Renmin University of China, where he majored in national economic plan.

== Career ==
After university in 1985, Tang was assigned to Guizhou Provincial Planning Commission. He joined the Chinese Communist Party (CCP) in July 1995. Starting in 1996, he served in several posts in the People's Government of Guizhou, including deputy director and director of the Planning and Construction Division of the General Office, director of the 5th Secretariat Division of the General Office, deputy secretary-general, director of the General Office, and secretary-general.

In May 2017, Tang was transferred to Qiannan Buyei and Miao Autonomous Prefecture and appointed party secretary, the top political position in prefecture.

In October 2024, Tang took office as vice chairperson of the Guizhou Provincial Committee of the Chinese People's Political Consultative Conference, the provincial advisory body.

== Downfall ==
On 29 August 2025, Tang was put under investigation for alleged "serious violations of discipline and laws" by the Central Commission for Discipline Inspection (CCDI), the party's internal disciplinary body, and the National Supervisory Commission, the highest anti-corruption agency of China. His three deputies in Qiannan Buyei and Miao Autonomous Prefecture, Wu Shenghua, Zhong Yang and Xiang Chengqiang, were sacked for graft in succession. Tang was expelled from the party and dismissed from the public offices on 2 March 2026.

Government offices
Preceded by Zou Wei (邹伟)	Secretary-General of Guizhou Provincial People's Government; 2011–2017	Succeeded by Ren Xiangsheng
Party political offices
Preceded by Long Changchun	Communist Party Secretary of Qiannan Buyei and Miao Autonomous Prefecture; 2017–2024	Succeeded by Hong Hupeng (洪湖鹏)
