= Li Zaihe =

Chinese politician

Li Zaihe (Chinese: 李再含; 1919–1975) was a Chinese politician. He was born in Fushun County, Sichuan Province. He was Chinese Communist Party Committee Secretary and governor of Guizhou Province.

Preceded by Jia Qiyun	Party Secretary of Guizhou	Succeeded by Lan Yinong
Preceded by Li Li	Governor of Guizhou	Succeeded by Lan Yinong
