= Governor of Guizhou =

Governor of the Guizhou Provincial People's Government
- 贵州省人民政府省长
- National Emblem of China

- Flag of China
- Incumbent; Li Bingjun since 24 November 2020
- Guizhou Provincial People's Government
- Type: Governor
- Status: Provincial and ministerial-level official
- Reports to: Guizhou Provincial People's Congress and its Standing Committee
- Nominator: Presidium of the Guizhou Provincial People's Congress
- Appointer: Guizhou Provincial People's Congress
- Term length: Five years, renewable
- Inaugural holder: Yang Yong
- Formation: December 1949
- Deputy: Deputy Governors; Secretary-General

The governor of Guizhou, officially the Governor of the Guizhou Provincial People's Government, is the head of Guizhou Province and leader of the Guizhou Provincial People's Government.

The governor is elected by the Guizhou Provincial People's Congress, and responsible to it and its Standing Committee. The governor is a provincial level official and is responsible for the overall decision-making of the provincial government. The governor is assisted by an executive vice governor as well as several vice governors. The governor generally serves as the deputy secretary of the Guizhou Provincial Committee of the Chinese Communist Party and as a member of the CCP Central Committee. The governor is the second highest-ranking official in the province after the secretary of the CCP Guizhou Committee. The current governor is Li Bingjun, who took office on 24 November 2020.

== List of governors ==
=== People's Republic of China ===
Portrait	Name (English)	Name (Chinese)	Term start	Term end	Ref.
	Yang Yong	杨勇	December 1949	December 1954	
	Zhou Lin	周林	December 1954	July 1965	
	Li Li	李立	July 1965	February 1967	
	Li Zaihe	李再含	February 1967	May 1971	
	Lan Yinong	蓝亦农	May 1971	September 1973	
	Lu Ruilin	鲁瑞林	September 1973	February 1977	
	Ma Li	马力	February 1977	September 1979	
	Su Gang	苏钢	January 1980	January 1983	
	Wang Zhaowen	王朝文	January 1983	January 1993	
	Chen Shineng	陈士能	January 1993	July 1996	
	Wu Yixia	吴亦侠	July 1996	September 1998	
	Qian Yunlu	钱运录	December 1998	January 2001	
	Shi Xiushi	石秀诗	January 2001	July 2006	
	Lin Shusen	林树森	July 2006	August 2010	
	Zhao Kezhi	赵克志	28 September 2010	18 December 2012	
	Chen Min'er	陈敏尔	18 December 2012	16 October 2015	
	Sun Zhigang	孙志刚	16 October 2015	6 September 2017	
	Shen Yiqin	谌贻琴	6 September 2017	24 November 2020	
	Li Bingjun	李炳军	24 November 2020	Incumbent	
