= Xi Gang =

Chinese seal carver and painter

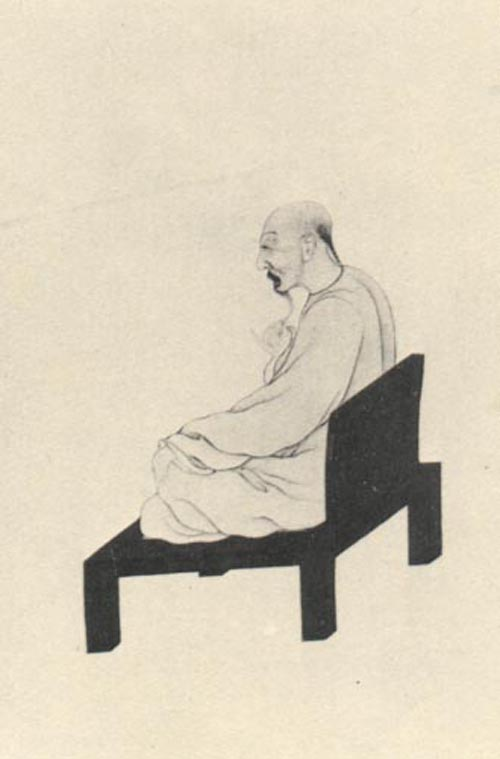
Name: Xi Gang Date of birth: 1746 Date of death: 1803 Nationality: Chinese Activities: Painter, calligraphy, scholar

Xi Gang (simplified Chinese: 奚冈; traditional Chinese: 奚岡; pinyin: Xī Gāng; Wade–Giles: Hsi Kang); 1746-1803 was a renowned seal carver and painter in Qing Dynasty. He was born in Qiántáng (钱塘, present day Hangzhou). His style name was Chunzhang (纯章) and his pseudonym was Tiesheng (铁生). Other names include Hezhusheng (鹤注生) and Mengquan Waishi (蒙泉 外史). His specialty was in painting landscapes. His seal carving method was similar to that of Ding Jing (丁敬) (with whom he co-founded the Zhe School of carving), though somewhat cleaner and sharper. His style is representative of the Southern School. He was also talented in prose and calligraphy.
