= Li Li (politician) =

Chinese politician

Li Li (Chinese: 李立; 1908 – January 19, 2006) was a Chinese politician. He was born in Yongxin County, Jiangxi Province. He was governor of Guizhou Province.

Preceded by Zhou Lin	Governor of Guizhou	Succeeded by Li Zaihe
