= Ma Li (politician) =

Chinese politician

Ma Li (Chinese: 马力) (1916–1979) was a Chinese politician. He was born in Ji County, Tianjin. He was Chinese Communist Party Committee Secretary and governor of Guizhou Province.

| Preceded by Lu Ruilin | Party Secretary of Guizhou | Succeeded by Chi Biqing |
| Preceded by Lu Ruilin | Governor of Guizhou | Succeeded by Su Gang |
