= Lu Yongzheng =

Chinese politician (born 1967)

- 卢雍政
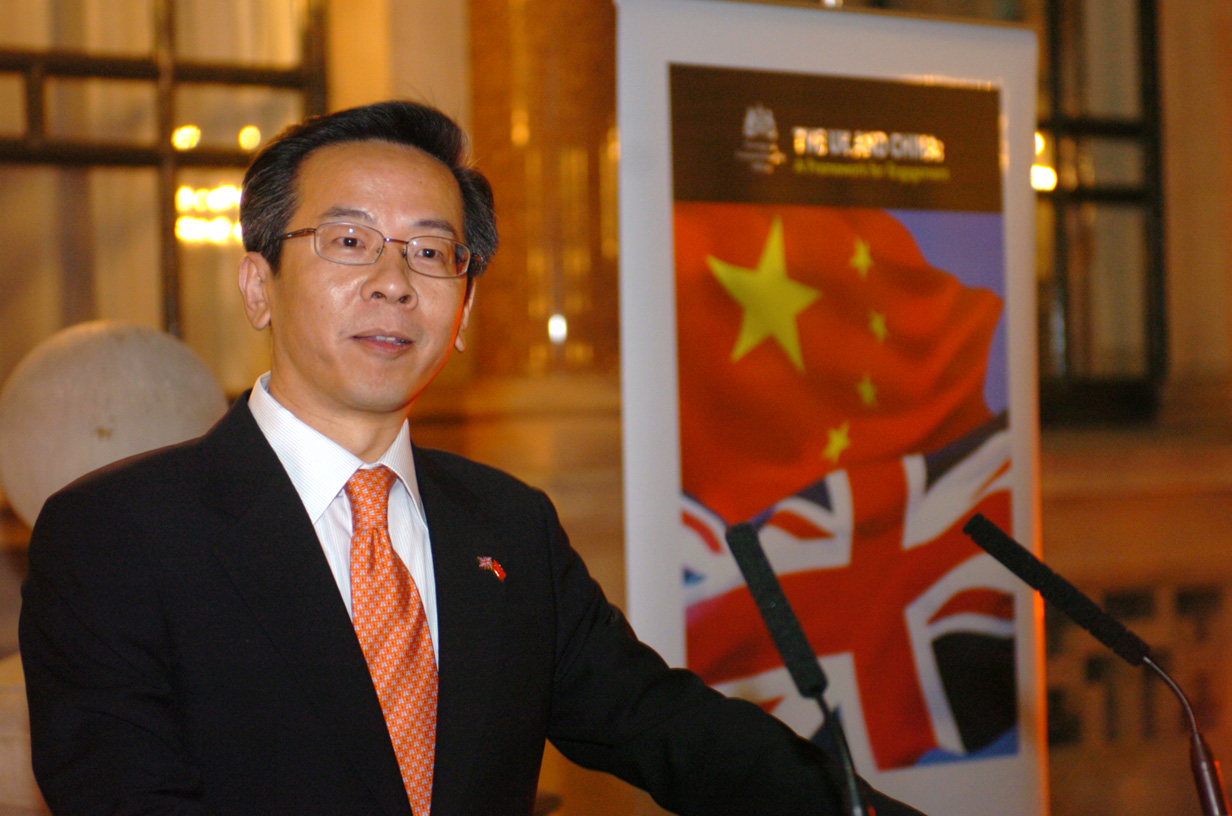

Director of Publicity Department of the CPC Guizhou Committee
- Incumbent
- Assumed office January 2020
- Preceded by: Mu Degui

Vice-Governor of Guizhou
- In office March 2016 – March 2020
- Governor: Sun Zhigang; Shen Yiqin

Deputy Director of State Administration of Civil Service
- In office May 2013 – March 2016

Personal details
- Born: September 1967 (age 59) Yiyang, Hunan, China
- Party: Chinese Communist Party
- Education: Wuhan University; Central Party School of the Chinese Communist Party; Cheung Kong Graduate School of Business

Lu Yongzheng (simplified Chinese: 卢雍政; traditional Chinese: 盧雍政; pinyin: Lú Yōngzhèng; born September 1967) is a Chinese politician and the current Director of the Publicity Department of the CCP Guizhou Committee.

== Biography ==
Lu was born in September 1967 in Yiyang, Hunan. He entered Wuhan University in September 1985, majoring in Chinese language and literature at the Department of Chinese Literature, where he graduated in July 1989. He joined the Chinese Communist Party in January 1986 when he was a freshman.

After graduation, he was assigned to the People's Daily, he worked there until September 1993. In September 1997 he was transferred to the Communist Youth League, he served in several posts there, including director of Youth Volunteer Action Guidance Center and secretary of the Secretariat of the Central Committee. In May 2013 he was appointed deputy director of State Administration of Civil Service, a position he held until March 2016. Then he rose to become vice-governor of Guizhou. As vice-governor, he is responsible for the work of opening up, attracting investment, foreign trade, development zone and comprehensive insurance area construction management, human resources and social security, culture, tourism development and management, and the safety of production.

In January 2020, Lu was appointed as the Director of Publicity Department of the CCP Guizhou Committee.

Party political offices
Preceded by Mu Degui	Director of Publicity Department of the CPC Guizhou Committee; 2020	Incumbent
