= Huang Yi (Qing dynasty) =

Chinese calligrapher

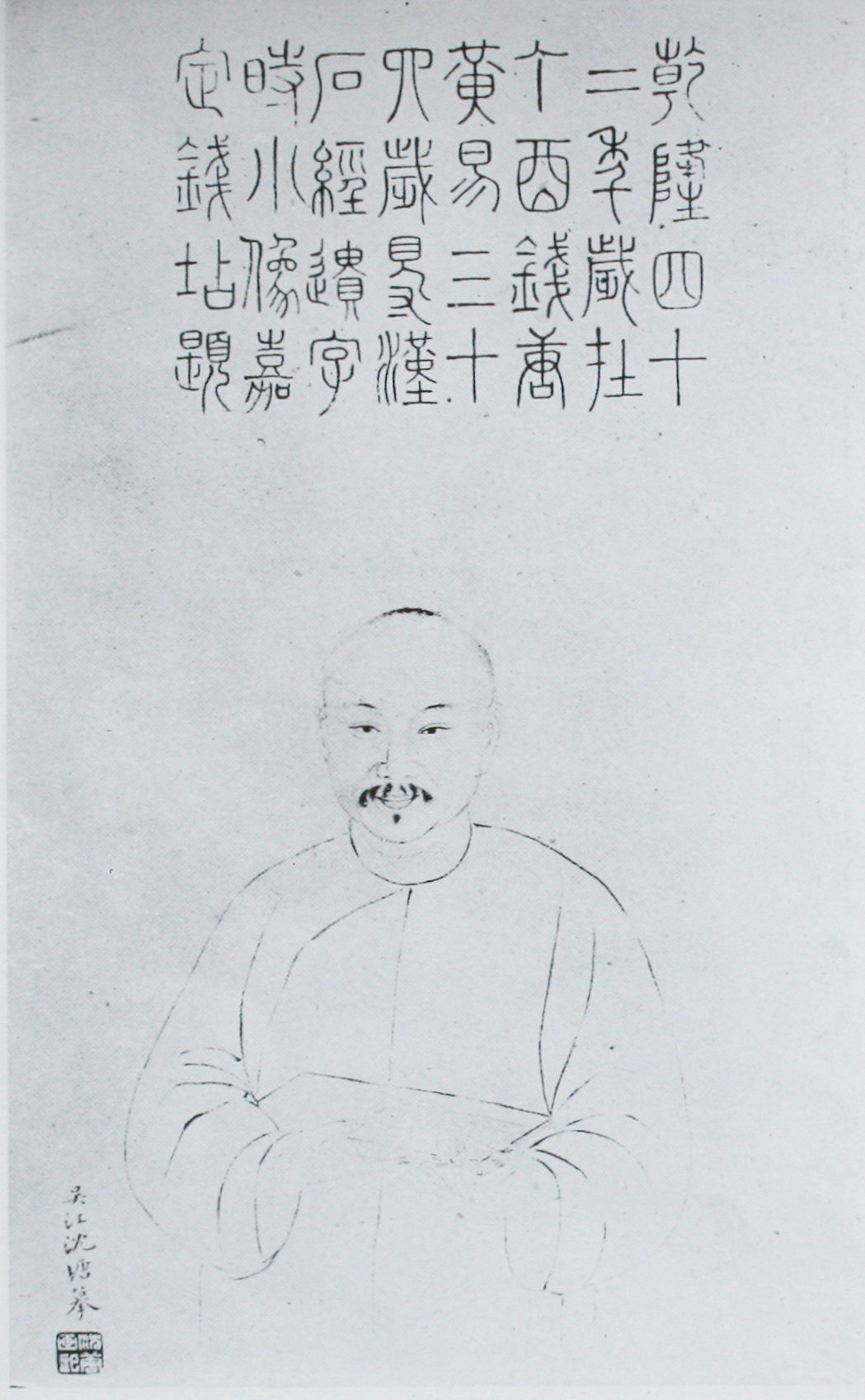
Portrait

Huang Yi (Chinese: 黄易) (1744-1801), a.k.a. Da Yi; Qiu An; Xiao Song was a Chinese calligrapher, painter, and seal artist during the Qing dynasty.

Huang was from Hangzhou. He served briefly as a government official in Yanzhou District, but was primarily a painter and seal carver. A student of Ding Jing, he was one of the Eight Masters of Xiling. Since he and Ding Jing were both seal carvers and calligraphers, they became known by the joint surname, "Ding Huang". Huang was also a close acquaintance of Weng Fanggang.

Huang travelled widely and published diaries and collections of paintings based on his travels. He primarily travelled in search of ancient stone inscriptions, which he preserved as rubbings for posterity.

== Examples of seals by Huang Yi ==
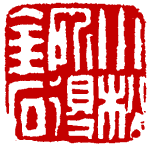

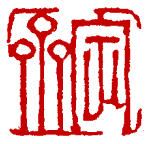

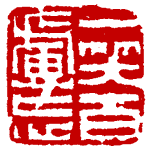

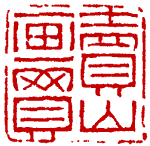

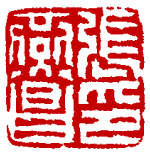

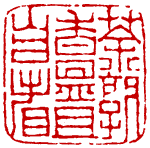
