= Huang Yi (politician) =

Chinese politician

- 黄毅

Vice Chairman of the Yunnan Provincial Committee of the Chinese People's Political Consultative Conference
- In office 20 January 2017 – 18 January 2022
- Chairman: Luo Zhengfu; Li Jiang

Personal details
- Born: August 1958 (age 68) Ruili, Yunnan, China
- Party: Chinese Communist Party (1981–2022; expelled)
- Education: Yunnan Agricultural University; Wuhan University of Technology; Tsinghua University; Harvard Kennedy School

Chinese name
- Simplified Chinese: 黄毅
- Traditional Chinese: 黃毅
Transcriptions
Standard Mandarin
- Hanyu Pinyin: Huáng Yì

Huang Yi (Chinese: 黄毅; born August 1958) is a former Chinese politician who spent his entire career in southwest China's Yunnan province. He was investigated by China's top anti-graft agency in March 2022. Previously he served as vice chairman of the Yunnan Provincial Committee of the Chinese People's Political Consultative Conference. He was a member of the 11th and 12th National Committee of the Chinese People's Political Consultative Conference.

== Biography ==
Huang was born in Ruili, Yunnan, in August 1958. During the late Cultural Revolution, he was a sent-down youth in Longchuan County between September 1975 and February 1978. After resuming the college entrance examination in 1978, he was admitted to Yunnan Agricultural University, majoring in tea-leaves. After graduation, he stayed and worked at the university.

Huang joined the Chinese Communist Party (CCP) in January 1981, and got involved in politics in March 1989, when he was appointed vice mayor of Ruili. In May 1993, he became vice governor of Dehong Dai and Jingpo Autonomous Prefecture, and held that office until June 1996, when he was made deputy director of the Yunnan Provincial Department of Foreign Trade and Economic Cooperation. In December 2001, he was named party chief of Baoshan, his first foray into a prefectural leadership role. He was promoted to be party branch secretary of Yunnan Provincial People's Government in June 2005, concurrently holding the secretary-general position. He was appointed head of the United Front Department of the CCP Yunnan Provincial Committee in November 2006 and was admitted to member of the standing committee of the CCP Yunnan Provincial Committee, the province's top authority. In January 2017, he took office as vice chairman of the Yunnan Provincial Committee of the Chinese People's Political Consultative Conference, the province's top political advisory body.

=== Downfall ===
On 24 March 2022, he was put under investigation for alleged "serious violations of discipline and laws" by the Central Commission for Discipline Inspection (CCDI), the party's internal disciplinary body, and the National Supervisory Commission, the highest anti-corruption agency of China. On August 30, he was expelled from the CCP.

On 4 July 2023, Huang was sentenced to 13 years in prison and fined 3 million yuan for bribery.

Government offices
Preceded by Liu Ping (刘平)	Secretary-General of Yunnan Provincial People's Government; 2005–2006	Succeeded by Ding Shaoxiang
Party political offices
Preceded by Luo Zhengfu	Communist Party Secretary of Baoshan; 2001–2005	Succeeded by Xiong Qinghua (熊清华)
Preceded by Luo Zhengfu	Head of the United Front Department of the Yunnan Provincial Committee of the Chinese Communist Party; 2006–2016	Succeeded by Yang Ning
