= Zhao Kezhi =

Chinese politician (born 1953)

Police Commissioner General Zhao Kezhi
- 赵克志
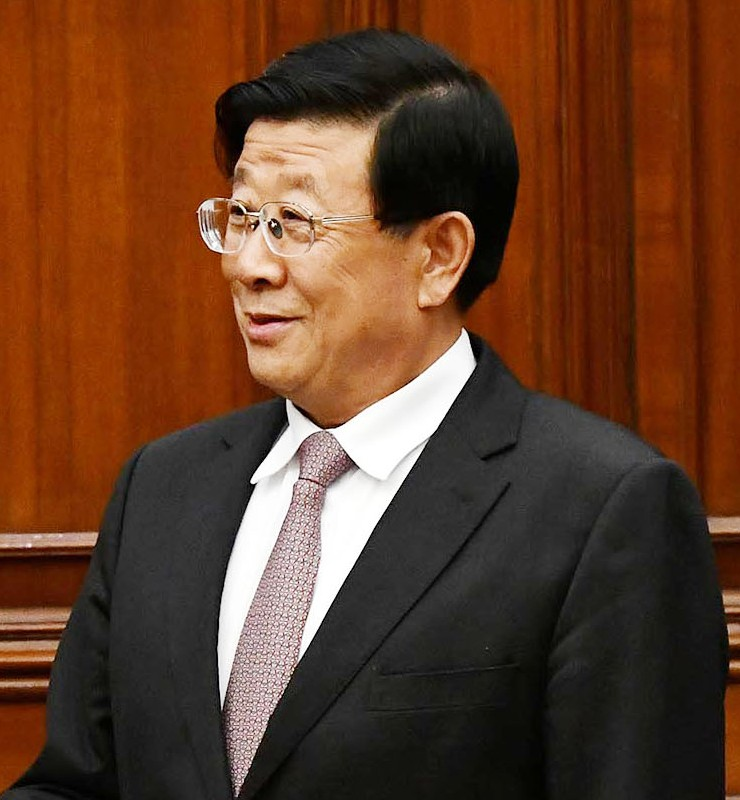
- Zhao in 2018

State Councilor of China
- In office 19 March 2018 – 12 March 2023
- Premier: Li Keqiang
- Preceded by: Guo Shengkun
- Succeeded by: Wang Xiaohong

Minister of Public Security
- In office 4 November 2017 – 24 June 2022
- Premier: Li Keqiang
- Deputy: Fu Zhenghua, Wang Xiaohong, others
- Preceded by: Guo Shengkun
- Succeeded by: Wang Xiaohong

Party Secretary of Hebei
- In office 31 July 2015 – 28 October 2017
- Deputy: Zhang Qingwei→Xu Qin (Governor); Zhao Yong (party affairs)
- Preceded by: Zhou Benshun
- Succeeded by: Wang Dongfeng

Chairman of Hebei People's Congress
- In office 12 January 2016 – 1 December 2017
- Preceded by: Zhou Benshun
- Succeeded by: Wang Dongfeng

Party Secretary of Guizhou
- In office 18 July 2012 – 31 July 2015
- Deputy: Chen Min'er (Governor); Chen Yiqin (party affairs)
- Preceded by: Li Zhanshu
- Succeeded by: Chen Min'er

Chairman of Guizhou People's Congress
- In office 31 January 2013 – 15 January 2016
- Preceded by: Li Zhanshu
- Succeeded by: Chen Min'er

Governor of Guizhou
- In office 28 September 2010 – 18 December 2012
- Preceded by: Lin Shusen
- Succeeded by: Chen Min'er

Personal details
- Born: 28 December 1953 (age 72) Laixi, Shandong, China
- Party: Chinese Communist Party
- Education: Central Party School
- Website: www.gov.cn/zhaokezhi

Chinese name
- Simplified Chinese: 赵克志
- Traditional Chinese: 趙克志
Transcriptions
Standard Mandarin
- Hanyu Pinyin: Zhào Kèzhì

Zhao Kezhi (Chinese: 赵克志; born 28 December 1953) is a Chinese retired politician who served as a State Councilor of the People's Republic of China and as the Minister and Party Committee Secretary of the Ministry of Public Security, with the top police officer rank of Police Commissioner General. He is the former Party Secretary of Hebei and the Party Secretary of Guizhou, and the former Governor of Guizhou. He had also previously served as a vice governor of Shandong and Jiangsu provinces.

== Career ==
Zhao was born in Laixi, Shandong province. He entered the workforce in March 1973 as a middle school teacher in Laixi, and joined the Chinese Communist Party in January 1975. In April 1984, he became Laixi's mayor and deputy Communist Party Chief. In March 1987, he was appointed mayor and deputy party chief of nearby Jimo, and became its party chief in 1989. In December 1997, he was promoted to be the party chief of Dezhou, a prefecture-level city in Shandong. From February 2001 to March 2006, he was the vice governor of Shandong province.

In 2006, Zhao was transferred to the neighbouring Jiangsu province, where he was the executive vice governor until August 2010, when he was transferred again to southwestern Guizhou province, where he was appointed deputy party secretary and acting governor. A month later he was elected by the Guizhou Provincial Congress as governor. In July 2012 Zhao was promoted to concurrently serve as the Party Secretary of Guizhou; in December he relinquished his governor post, and Chen Min'er was chosen as his successor.

In July 2015, following the dismissal of Zhou Benshun, Zhao was named party chief of Hebei province. During his term in Hebei, planning began for the ambitious Xiong'an New Area. In October 2017, shortly after the 19th Party Congress, Zhao, then 63, was appointed as the Party Committee Secretary of the Ministry of Public Security. He was appointed as the Minister of Public Security on November 4, 2017.

In March 2018, Zhao was appointed as a State Councilor. In June 2018, he became Deputy Secretary of the Central Political and Legal Affairs Commission.

On June 24, 2022, Zhao was replaced by Wang Xiaohong as the Minister of Public Security. He retired from politics after he stepped down as State Councilor in March 2023.

Zhao is a member of the 18th and 19th Central Committees of the Chinese Communist Party.

Government offices
Preceded by Xiao Shicheng (肖世诚)	Magistrate of Jimo County; 1987–1989	Succeeded by Meng Guangyao (孟广耀)
Preceded by Jiang Dingzhi	Executive Vice Governor of Jiangsu; 2006–2010	Succeeded by Li Yunfeng
Preceded by Lin Shusen	Governor of Guizhou; 2010–2012	Succeeded by Chen Min'er
Preceded by Guo Shengkun	Minister of Public Security; 2017–2022	Succeeded by Wang Xiaohong
Party political offices
Preceded by Qin Yusheng (秦玉生)	Party Secretary of Jimo County (Jimo); 1989–1991	Succeeded by Meng Guangyao
Preceded by Mo Zhenkui	Party Secretary of Dezhou; 1997–2001	Succeeded by Huang Sheng (黄胜)
Preceded by Li Zhanshu	Party Secretary of Guizhou; 2012–2015	Succeeded by Chen Min'er
Preceded by Zhou Benshun	Party Secretary of Hebei; 2015–2017	Succeeded by Wang Dongfeng
Assembly seats
Preceded by Li Zhanshu	Chairman of Guizhou People's Congress; 2013–2016	Succeeded by Chen Min'er
Preceded by Zhou Benshun	Chairman of Hebei People's Congress; 2016–2017	Succeeded by Wang Dongfeng
