= Long Zhiyi =

Chinese novelist and politician (1929–2021)

- 龙志毅

Chairman of the Guizhou Provincial Committee of the Chinese People's Political Consultative Conference
- In office January 1993 – January 1998
- Preceded by: Miao Chunting
- Succeeded by: Wang Siqi

Personal details
- Born: 1929 Yongshan County, Yunnan, China
- Died: 31 December 2021 (aged 92) Guiyang, Guizhou, China
- Party: Chinese Communist Party
- Spouse: Ye Shenzhen
- Education: Yunnan University

Chinese name
- Simplified Chinese: 龙志毅
- Traditional Chinese: 龍志毅
Transcriptions
Standard Mandarin
- Hanyu Pinyin: Lóng Zhìyì

Long Zhiyi (Chinese: 龙志毅; 1929 – 31 December 2021) was a Chinese novelist and politician of Yi ethnicity who served as chairman of the Guizhou Provincial Committee of the Chinese People's Political Consultative Conference between 1993 and 1998. He was a representative of the 13th, 14th and 15th National Congress of the Chinese Communist Party. He was a member of the 9th and 8th National Committees of the Chinese People's Political Consultative Conference. He was a delegate to the 10th National People's Congress.

== Early life and career ==
Long was born in Tuanjie Township of Yongshan County, Yunnan, in 1929. He graduated from Yunnan University. He took part in the communist revolution in 1949. He began to publish his works in 1947 and joined the China Writers Association in 1991. In 1987, he was appointed deputy party secretary of Guizhou, concurrently serving as head of its Organization Department. He became chairman of the Guizhou Provincial Committee of the Chinese People's Political Consultative Conference in January 1993, and served until January 1998.

== Personal life and death ==
In 1952, Long married Ye Shenzhen (叶慎真) in Guizhou, their son named Long Long (龙隆) and their grandson nicknamed Youyou (游游). He died in Guiyang, Guizhou on 31 December 2021, at the age of 92.

== Works ==
=== Novels ===
- 省城轶事 [Anecdotes of Provincial Capital] (in Chinese). Guiyang, Guizhou: Guizhou People's Publishing House. 1 September 1993. ISBN 9787221031945.
- 政界 [Politics] (in Chinese). Tianjin: Baihua Literature and Art Publishing House. 1 January 1999. ISBN 9787530628515.
- 王国末日 [The End of the Kingdom] (in Chinese). Tianjin: Baihua Literature and Art Publishing House. 1 January 2003. ISBN 9787530636619.
- 岁岁年年 [Year after Year] (in Chinese). Beijing: Writers Publishing House. 1 October 2005. ISBN 9787506309899.

=== Collection of short stories ===
- 厂长的私生活 [The Private Life of the Factory Director] (in Chinese). Guiyang, Guizhou: Guizhou People's Publishing House. 1 April 1989. ISBN 9787221009890.
- Collection of Short Stories by Long Zhiyi (龙志毅小说集)

=== Collection of essays ===
- 龙志毅散文选 [Collection of Essays by Long Zhiyi] (in Chinese). Guiyang, Guizhou: Guizhou People's Publishing House. 1 January 1998. ISBN 9787221045614.

Assembly seats
Preceded by Miao Chunting	Chairman of the Guizhou Provincial Committee of the Chinese People's Political Consultative Conference; 1993–1998	Succeeded by Wang Siqi
