= Wu Shenghua =

Chinese politician

- 吴胜华

Communist Party Secretary of Bijie
- In office 5 May 2022 – July 2025
- Preceded by: Wu Qiang
- Succeeded by: Guo Xiwen

Governor of Qiannan Buyei and Miao Autonomous Prefecture
- In office October 2016 – March 2021
- Party Secretary: Long Changchun; Tang Dezhi
- Preceded by: Xiang Hongqiong
- Succeeded by: Zhong Yang

Personal details
- Born: October 1966 (age 60) Duyun, Guizhou, China
- Party: Chinese Communist Party (1994-2026, expelled)
- Education: Guizhou Agricultural University

Chinese name
- Simplified Chinese: 吴胜华
- Traditional Chinese: 吳勝華
Transcriptions
Standard Mandarin
- Hanyu Pinyin: Wú Shènghuá

Wu Shenghua (Chinese: 吴胜华; born October 1966) is a former Chinese politician of Bouyei ethnicity previously served as party secretary of Bijie.

He was an alternate of the 19th Central Committee of the Chinese Communist Party. He is a representative of the 20th National Congress of the Chinese Communist Party and an alternate of the 20th Central Committee of the Chinese Communist Party. He was a delegate to the 13th National People's Congress.

== Biography ==
Wu was born in Duyun, Guizhou, in October 1966. In 1984, he entered Guizhou Agricultural University (now Guizhou University), majoring in agronomy.

After graduating in 1988, he was assigned to Luodian County, where he eventually becoming deputy magistrate in June 1997 and executive deputy magistrate in January 2000. He joined the Chinese Communist Party (CCP) in July 1994. He became magistrate of Guiding County in September 2004, and then party secretary, the top political position in the county, beginning in November 2005. In February 2007, he became vice governor of Qiannan Bouyei and Miao Autonomous Prefecture, rising to governor in February 2017. He also served as deputy party secretary, secretary of the Political and Legal Affairs Commission, president of the Party School, and secretary of the Party Working Committee of Duyun Economic Development Zone. He was appointed vice governor of Guizhou in October 2020 and in April 2022 was admitted to member of the Standing Committee of the CCP Guizhou Provincial Committee, the province's top authority. In May 2022, he was transferred to Bijie and appointed party secretary.

== Downfall ==
On 24 July 2025, Wu was suspected of "serious violations of laws and regulations" by the Central Commission for Discipline Inspection (CCDI), the party's internal disciplinary body, and the National Supervisory Commission, the highest anti-corruption agency of China. Wu was expelled from the Party and dismissed from the public office on 7 January 2026. On 29 October 2026, the fifth plenary session of the 20th CCP Central Committee reviewed and approved the report of the CCDI on the "serious violations of discipline and law" by Wu and confirmed the Politburo decision to expel him from the CCP.

Government offices
Preceded by Xiang Hongqiong	Governor of Qiannan Buyei and Miao Autonomous Prefecture; 2016–2021	Succeeded by Zhong Yang
Party political offices
Preceded by Wu Qiang	Communist Party Secretary of Bijie; 2022–2025	Succeeded by Guo Xiwen
