= Zhou Lin (politician) =

Chinese politician (1912–1997)

- 周林

First Secretary of the CCP Guizhou Provincial Committee
- In office 1954–1964
- Preceded by: Su Zhenhua
- Succeeded by: Li Dazhang

Governor of Guizhou
- In office 1955–1965
- Preceded by: Yang Yong
- Succeeded by: Li Li

Party Secretary of Peking University
- In office 1977–1979
- Succeeded by: Han Tianshi

Personal details
- Born: 1912 Renhuai, Guizhou, China
- Died: 1997 (aged 85) Beijing, China
- Party: Chinese Communist Party

Zhou Lin (Chinese: 周林; pinyin: Zhōu Lín; 1912–1997) was a Chinese politician who led his home province of Guizhou as first secretary of the Chinese Communist Party (CCP) provincial committee from 1954 to 1964. His tenure covered the Great Leap Forward and the famine that followed, in which an estimated 1.7 million people in the province died unnatural deaths. He was removed in 1964 during the Four Cleanups campaign. He returned to office in 1975 and later led Nanjing University and Peking University, served as a vice-minister of education and sat on the Central Advisory Commission.

== Early life and career ==
Zhou was born in 1912 in Renhuai, Guizhou. He studied at Hongda College in Peiping, where he took part in the student movement. According to the historian Gao Hua, he joined the CCP in the mid-1930s and served under Chen Yi during the war years. He joined the New Fourth Army in 1938, and his posts in it included head of the military law office of the army's Jiangnan Command and head of the counter-espionage department of the 1st Division's political department. During the Chinese Civil War, he headed the political department of the organs directly under the East China Military Region. In 1948, he became deputy party secretary and mayor of Xuzhou. After 1949, he served as secretary-general of the Shanghai Municipal People's Government.

== Political career ==
In August 1950, Zhou was transferred from Shanghai back to his native province. He became a member of the standing committee of the CCP Guizhou Provincial Committee in 1950, and in 1951 he was made vice-chairman of the provincial government and a member of the Southwest Military and Administrative Committee. In 1954, he became first secretary of the provincial party committee and head of the provincial government, and he held both posts until 1964. In 1960, he was also appointed a secretary of the secretariat of the CCP Southwest Bureau. The journalist Liu Xuezhu noted in 2008 that, apart from Zhu Houze, Zhou was the only Guizhou native to have served as the province's party secretary. He worked in senior posts in Guizhou for 14 years, ten of them as the province's top leader, the longest tenure of any of its principal leaders.

Gao Hua credits Zhou's administration with linking all 81 of Guizhou's counties to the road network by 1964, and with bringing the Guizhou–Guangxi railway to Guiyang in 1959. Gao also notes that Zhou took a steady and cautious approach to the Mashan incident of 1956. At the same time, Gao writes that Zhou favoured Guizhou-born cadres over officials sent from other provinces, which caused resentment among the latter. In 1959, Zhou's provincial leadership labelled his rivals Chang Song, Xia Deyi and Li Tinggui an "anti-party clique", one of more than forty such groups named in the province.

=== Great Leap Forward and famine ===
During the Great Leap Forward, according to Gao, Zhou was among the first provincial leaders to set up public canteens and launched a campaign against the concealment of grain output, policies that Gao links to mass deaths in the province. Citing the demographer Cao Shuji, Gao estimates that about 1.746 million people in Guizhou died unnatural deaths during the famine, about 10.5 per cent of the province's pre-famine population. In the first half of 1960, Mao Zedong praised Guizhou as a "Red Flag province" for others to emulate. In May 1960, according to Gao, Zhou played down the scale of the deaths when briefing Premier Zhou Enlai, and the provincial committee's report was adjusted to minimise the problem.

From 1961, Zhou took remedial measures, including restoring private plots, reopening rural markets and exempting hillside land from grain levies for three years. Gao writes that, unlike Zeng Xisheng in Anhui, Zhou said little in public about household contracting but allowed his subordinates to carry it out. At the Seven Thousand Cadres Conference in 1962, Mao consoled Zhou and accepted part of the responsibility for the famine.

=== Four Cleanups and removal ===
In 1964, the Southwest Bureau under Li Jingquan, a member of the Politburo, sent about 2,000 work-team members to Guizhou for the Four Cleanups campaign, including more than 100 bureau-level cadres. Gao describes this as unique among the provinces, and links the campaign to the "Peach Garden experience" promoted by Liu Shaoqi. The work teams were led by Li Dazhang, who became acting first secretary of Guizhou in October 1964. Zhou was stripped of his post as first secretary, demoted to a member of the secretariat and removed as governor.

The official reasons given for his removal were that the roots of the party's founding in Guizhou were unsound, that the suppression of counter-revolutionaries and land reform had been incomplete, and that the screening of cadres had not been properly handled. The Southwest Bureau concluded that "Guizhou has rotted", labelled Guiyang a "little Taiwan" and called its municipal government a "counter-revolutionary two-faced regime". The Guiyang party secretary, Wu Jiamo, was arrested and sentenced, and many other officials were removed or detained between October and December 1964. Gao regards the Southwest Bureau's accusations as unfounded.

In late 1964, Zhou appealed directly to Mao and the Central Committee. In January 1965, Mao told Li Jingquan to withdraw the Southwest Bureau's work teams and reinstate Zhou, but Li refused, saying that Zhou had been thoroughly discredited in Guizhou. Li Jingquan and Li Dazhang pressed Zhou until March 1965 to admit that the provincial committee had committed errors of "right opportunism", but Zhou refused, citing the party centre's Twenty-three Articles. In July 1965, Li Jingquan said that Deng Xiaoping had decided that no conclusion would be drawn on the Four Cleanups in Guizhou.

In a conversation recorded by Zhu Houze in December 1978, Li Jingquan said that Zhou's problems did not amount to errors of political line. Li said that the 1959 cases against alleged anti-party groups had been resolved in a review in 1962, and that Zhou's later proposal to raise the share of private plots to between 15 and 20 per cent had been turned down by Li and never carried out.

== Later career ==
Zhou was brought back into service in the later years of the Cultural Revolution, and in 1975 he became party secretary of Nanjing University. In 1977, on Deng's nomination, he was appointed party secretary of Peking University and a vice-minister of education. The researcher Robin Munro wrote that, in November 1977, a new leadership of Zhou, Gao Tie and Wei Ming replaced the interim leadership at the university under Huang Xinbai. According to a student poster cited by Munro, Zhou and the Politburo member Fang Yi viewed the posters on campus on 12 March 1978 and judged the student debate to be a local matter. Zhou was succeeded as the university's party secretary by Han Tianshi.

In the 1980s, Zhou served as deputy head of the State Council's planning group for the collation and publication of ancient books. At the 12th National Congress in September 1982, he was elected a member of the Central Advisory Commission. He died on 1997 in Beijing at the age of 85.

Preceded by Su Zhenhua	Party Secretary of Guizhou; 1954–1964	Succeeded by Li Dazhang
Preceded by Yang Yong	Governor of Guizhou; 1955–1965	Succeeded by Li Li
