= Zhang Yuhuan =

Chinese architectural historian (1926–2015)

- 张驭寰
- Born: September 27, 1926; Shulan County, Jilin, Republic of China
- Died: 2015 (aged 88–89)
- Occupation: Historian

Academic background
- Education: Northeastern University
- Academic advisor: Liang Sicheng

Academic work
- Discipline: Chinese architecture
- Sub-discipline: Ancient Chinese architecture
- Institutions: Institute for History of Natural Sciences, Chinese Academy of Sciences
- Notable works: Illustration of Famous Buddhist Temples in China; Illustration of Buddhist Architecture in China

Chinese name
- Traditional Chinese: 張馭寰
- Simplified Chinese: 张驭寰
Transcriptions
Standard Mandarin
- Hanyu Pinyin: Zhāng Yùhuán

Zhang Yuhuan (27 September 1926 – 2015) was a Chinese architectural historian who is a researcher at the Institute for History of Natural Sciences, Chinese Academy of Sciences. He is internationally known for his studies on ancient Chinese architecture.

== Life and career ==
Zhang was born in Shulan County, Jilin, on 27 September 1926, during the Republic of China, while his ancestral home in Yuci District of Jinzhong, Shanxi. He secondary studied at the Fifth National High School of Jilin Province. In 1945, he enrolled at Northeastern University, where he majored in architecture. After graduating in 1951, he stayed at the university and taught there. Soon after, he was despatched to the Ministry of Heavy Industry of the Central People's Government. In 1953, he studied architecture under Professor Liang Sicheng at the Research Office of Chinese Ancient Architectural Theory and History, in co-operation with by the Chinese Academy of Sciences and Tsinghua University. In 1968, he was transferred to the Institute for History of Natural Sciences, Chinese Academy of Sciences as a researcher. In October 2011, he joined the Chinese Communist Party at the age of 85. On 18 July 2012, he was recruited by Kaifeng Municipal Government as a cultural consultant. Zhang died in 2015.

== Publications ==
- 图解中国著名佛教寺院 [Illustration of Famous Buddhist Temples in China] (in Chinese). Beijing: Contemporary China Publishing House. 2012. ISBN 978-7-5154-0135-5.
- 图解中国佛教建筑 [Illustration of Buddhist Architecture in China] (in Chinese). Beijing: Contemporary China Publishing House. 2012. ISBN 978-7-5154-0118-8.
- 传世浮屠 [Buddhist Pagodas in China] (in Chinese). Tianjin: Tianjin University Press. 2010. ISBN 9787561833711.
- 中国风水塔 [Chinese Feng Shui Tower] (in Chinese). Beijing: Xueyuan Publishing House. 2011. ISBN 9787507736984.
- 中国佛塔史 [History of Chinese Buddhist Pagodas] (in Chinese). Beijing: Science Press. 2006. ISBN 9787030165893.
- 中国古代建筑文化 [Ancient Architectural Culture in China] (in Chinese). Beijing: Mechanical Industry Press. 2007. ISBN 9787111203025.
- 中国古建筑分类图说 [On the Classification of Chinese Ancient Architecture] (in Chinese). Zhengzhou, Henan: Henan Science and Technology Press. 2005. ISBN 9787534927928.
- 中国古建筑散记 [Notes on Chinese Ancient Architecture] (in Chinese). Beijing: Posts and Telecommunications Press. 2009. ISBN 9787115192325.
- 中国城池史 [History of Ancient Cities in China] (in Chinese). Beijing: China Friendship Publishing Company. 2009. ISBN 9787505726079.
- 吉林民居 [Traditional Folk Houses in Jilin] (in Chinese). Tianjin: Tianjin University Press. 2009. ISBN 9787561832431.
