= Wang Fuyu =

Chinese politician

- 王富玉

Chairman of the Guizhou Provincial Committee of the Chinese People's Political Consultative Conference
- In office January 2013 – January 2018
- Preceded by: Wang Zhengfu
- Succeeded by: Liu Xiaokai

Communist Party Secretary of Haikou
- In office May 2002 – December 2004
- Preceded by: Cai Changsong
- Succeeded by: Wang Weilu

Communist Party Secretary of Sanya
- In office February 1998 – May 2002
- Preceded by: Hong Shouxiang
- Succeeded by: Yu Xun

Personal details
- Born: August 1952 (age 74) Tanghe County, Henan, China
- Party: Chinese Communist Party (1974–2021; expelled)
- Education: Changsha Metallurgical Industry School; Huazhong University of Science and Technology

Wang Fuyu (Chinese: 王富玉; pinyin: Wáng Fùyù; born August 1952) is a retired Chinese politician of Hui ethnicity. At the height of his political career, he was chairman of the Guizhou Provincial Committee of the Chinese People's Political Consultative Conference, the province's top political advisory body. Prior to that, he was party chief of Haikou and Sanya in south China's Hainan province. He was investigated by China's top anti-graft agency in February 2021. He was the third leader of provincial-ministerial level to be targeted in 2021, after Li Wenxi, former vice chairman of the Liaoning Provincial Committee of the Chinese People's Political Consultative Conference, and Song Liang, for executive vice governor of Gansu.

He was a delegate to the 17th and 18th National Congress of the Chinese Communist Party. He was a member of the 12th National Committee of the Chinese People's Political Consultative Conference.

== Early life and education ==
Wang was born in Tanghe County, Henan, in August 1952. In October 1973, he was admitted to Changsha Metallurgical Industry School. He joined the Chinese Communist Party (CCP) in June 1974. After graduating in January 1976, he was dispatched to North China Metallurgical and Mining Construction Company, a large state-owned enterprise under the Ministry of Metallurgical Industry.

== Career in Hebei ==
In June 1979, he entered the Organization Department of CCP Hebei Provincial Committee. Three years later, he became a secretary of the General Office of CCP Hebei Provincial Committee. He was deputy party chief, magistrate, and then party chief of Huolu County (now Luquan District) before serving as vice mayor of Shijiazhuang, capital and largest city of Hebei province, in April 1989.

== Career in Hainan ==
In July 1991, he was appointed vice mayor of Haikou, capital and most populous city of south China's Hainan province. In May 1994, he became mayor and party chief of Qiongshan (now Qiongshan District), a nearby county-level city of Haikou. In February 1998, he became party chief of Sanya, and was admitted to member of the standing committee of the CCP Hainan Provincial Committee, the province's top authority. In April 2002, he was promoted to deputy party chief of Hainan, and one month later concurrently holding the party chief of Haikou position.

== Career in Guizhou ==
In December 2004, he was transferred to southwest China's Guizhou province and appointed deputy party chief, a position he held for more than seven years. He served as vice chairman of the Guizhou Provincial Committee of the Chinese People's Political Consultative Conference in January 2012, and one year later promoted to the chairman and party branch secretary position. He retired in January 2018.

== Downfall ==
On February 21, 2021, the state media reported that he was being investigated for "serious violations of laws and regulations" by the Central Commission for Discipline Inspection (CCDI), the party's internal disciplinary body, and the National Supervisory Commission, the highest anti-corruption agency of China. On August 15, he was expelled from the CCP and dismissed from public office. On October 13, he was indicted on suspicion of accepting bribes. On November 30, he stood trial at the First Intermediate People's Court of Tianjin on charges of taking bribes. Prosecutors accused Wang of taking advantage of his different positions between 1995 and 2021 to seek profits for various companies and individuals in enterprise operation, planning approval and job adjustment. In return, he accepted 434 million yuan (about 68.13 million U.S. dollars) worth of money and valuables personally or through his family members.

On January 17, 2022, he was sentenced to death with a two-year reprieve for taking bribes worth 450 million yuan ($70.7 million) by Tianjin No. 1 Intermediate People's Court.

Party political offices
| Preceded by Hong Shouxiang | Communist Party Secretary of Sanya; 1998–2002 | Succeeded by Yu Xun |
| Preceded by Cai Changsong | Communist Party Secretary of Haikou; 2002–2004 | Succeeded by Wang Weilu |
Assembly seats
| Preceded by Wang Zhengfu | Chairman of the Guizhou Provincial Committee of the Chinese People's Political Consultative Conference; 2013–2018 | Succeeded by Liu Xiaokai |
