= Liu Xiaokai =

Chinese politician

Liu Xiaokai (Chinese: 刘晓凯)

Chairman of the Yunnan Provincial Committee of the Chinese People's Political Consultative Conference
- Incumbent
- Assumed office January 2023

Personal details
- Born: March 1962 (age 64) Taijiang County, Guizhou, China
- Party: Chinese Communist Party
- Education: Central Party School of the Chinese Communist Party

Liu Xiaokai (Chinese: 刘晓凯; born March 1962) is a Chinese politician of Miao ethnicity who currently serves as chairman and Party Secretary of the Yunnan Provincial Committee of the Chinese People's Political Consultative Conference (CPPCC). He previously held a long series of senior provincial and regional leadership roles in Guizhou, including head of Qiandongnan and Qiannan prefectures, and Vice Governor of Guizhou Province. Liu is a graduate of the Central Party School and trained originally as an engineer.

== Biography ==
Liu Xiaokai was born in Taijiang County, Guizhou, in March 1962. He entered Tsinghua University in 1978, majoring in welding engineering in the Department of Mechanical Engineering, and began his career in September 1983 at the Guizhou Boiler Factory, where he served successively as technician, deputy director of the steam drum workshop, deputy director of the factory office, deputy director of the total quality management office, and secretary of the factory youth league committee.

In 1987, Liu joined the Qiandongnan Prefecture Economic Commission, where he worked in technical reform and enterprise management, later serving as deputy director of the commission and concurrently deputy head of the prefecture's new technology promotion station. In the early 1990s, he became deputy director of the commission and briefly served on secondment as Deputy Party Secretary of Leishan County. Between 1992 and 1996, he served as Party Secretary of Jianhe County while completing mid-career studies at the Central Party School.

From 1996 onward, Liu held several leadership roles within the Communist Youth League and the Qiandongnan Prefectural Government, becoming Deputy Mayor and later Mayor of Qiandongnan Prefecture, and subsequently Governor from 1998 to 2005. He then served as Governor of Qiannan Prefecture before being appointed Party Secretary of Bijie in 2006 and First Secretary of the Bijie Military Subdistrict.

Beginning in 2008, Liu served as Vice Governor of Guizhou Province and later joined the provincial standing committee. From 2012 to 2018, he served as Member of the Standing Committee of the CCP Guizhou Provincial Committee and Head of the United Front Work Department. In January 2018, he became chairman and Party Secretary of the Guizhou Provincial Committee of the CPPCC, a position he held until 2023. In January 2023, he was appointed chairman and Party Secretary of the Yunnan Provincial Committee of the CPPCC.

Liu has been an alternate member of the 17th, 18th, and 19th Central Committees of the Chinese Communist Party, becoming a full member during the 18th Central Committee following a by-election. He has also served as a member of the 12th, 13th, and 14th National Committees of the CPPCC, and as a delegate to the Yunnan Provincial People's Congress.

Assembly seats
Preceded by Li Jiang	Chairman of the Chinese People's Political Consultative Conference Yunnan Provincial Committee; January 2023 –	Incumbent
Preceded by Wang Fuyu	Chairman of the Chinese People's Political Consultative Conference Guizhou Provincial Committee; January 2018 – January 2023	Succeeded by Zhao Yongqing
Party political offices
Preceded by Long Chaoyun	Minister of the United Front Work Department of the CCP Guizhou Provincial Committee; July 2012 – November 2018	Succeeded by Yan Chaojun
Preceded by Zhao Youliang	Secretary of the CCP Bijie Prefectural Committee; November 2006 – May 2008	Succeeded by Qin Rupei
Government offices
Preceded by Meng Qiliang	Governor of Qiannan Buyei and Miao Autonomous Prefecture; February 2005 – November 2006	Succeeded by Li Yuecheng
Preceded by Wang Zhengfu	Governor of Qiandongnan Miao and Dong Autonomous Prefecture; March 1998 – February 2005	Succeeded by Li Yuecheng
