= Zhao Yongqing =

Chinese politician

- 赵永清

Chairman of the Guizhou Provincial Committee of the Chinese People's Political Consultative Conference
- Incumbent
- Assumed office January 2023
- Preceded by: Liu Xiaokai

Personal details
- Born: April 1963 (age 63) Linqu County, Shandong, China
- Party: Chinese Communist Party
- Education: Changwei Normal School; Nanjing Agricultural University

Chinese name
- Simplified Chinese: 赵永清
- Traditional Chinese: 趙永清
Transcriptions
Standard Mandarin
- Hanyu Pinyin: Zhào Yǒngqīng

Zhao Yongqing (Chinese: 赵永清; born April 1963) is a Chinese politician, serving as chairman of the Guizhou Provincial Committee of the Chinese People's Political Consultative Conference since 2023.

Zhao was a representative of the 19th National Congress of the Chinese Communist Party. He is a member of the 14th National Committee of the Chinese People's Political Consultative Conference.

== Early life and education ==
Zhao was born in Linqu County, Shandong, in April 1963. In 1980, he entered Changwei Normal School, where he majored in Chinese language and literature. After graduating in 1982, he taught at Anqiu County No.4 High School. He obtained his master's degree in public administration from Nanjing Agricultural University in 2010.

== Career ==
=== Career in Shandong ===
Zhao got involved in politics in September 1987, when he was named a standing committee member of Changle County Federation of Trade Unions and head of its Production Protection Department. He joined the Chinese Communist Party (CCP) in January 1989. He was transferred to the CCP Changle County Committee in February 1992, where he finally became deputy magistrate in January 1998. In January 2003, he was made vice mayor of Zhucheng, but having held the position for only a year.

=== Career in Ningxia ===
In May 2004, Zhao was transferred to northwest China's Ningxia Hui Autonomous Region and appointed deputy director of the Land and Resources Department. He was chosen as executive vice mayor of Wuzhong and was admitted to standing committee member of the CCP Wuzhong Municipal Committee, the city's top authority. He had also briefly served as secretary of the Political and Legal Affairs Commission from December 2011 to February 2012 and party branch secretary of Ningxia Hui Autonomous Region Forestry Bureau from February 2012 to January 2013. He rose to party secretary, the top political position in the city, in January 2013. He concurrently served as chairman of the People's Congress between February 2013 to January 2017. In January 2017, he was admitted to standing committee member of the CCP Ningxia Hui Autonomous Regional Committee, the region's top authority. He also served as head of the Publicity Department of the CCP Ningxia Hui Autonomous Regional Committee and secretary-general of the CCP Ningxia Hui Autonomous Regional Committee. In June 2021, he was elevated to executive vice chairman of Ningxia Hui Autonomous Region, in addition to serving as vice chairman of the Ningxia Hui Autonomous Regional Committee of the Chinese People's Political Consultative Conference since January 2022.

=== Career in Guizhou ===
In January 2023, Zhao assumed the position of chairman of the Guizhou Provincial Committee of the Chinese People's Political Consultative Conference, the provincial advisory body.

Party political offices
Preceded by Shen Zuoquan	Communist Party Secretary of Wuzhong; 2013–2017	Succeeded by Bai Xueshan
Preceded by Cai Guoying	Head of the Publicity Department of Ningxia Hui Autonomous Regional Committee of the Chinese Communist Party; 2017–2019	Succeeded by Li Jinke
Preceded by Ji Zheng	Secretary-General of the Ningxia Hui Autonomous Regional Committee of the Chinese Communist Party; 2018–2021	Succeeded by Lei Dongsheng
Government offices
Preceded by Zhang Chaochao	Executive Vice Chairman of Ningxia Hui Autonomous Regional People's Government; 2021–2022	Succeeded by Chen Chunping
Assembly seats
Preceded by Liu Xiaokai	Chairman of the Guizhou Provincial Committee of the Chinese People's Political Consultative Conference; 2023–present	Incumbent
