= Li Zhanshu =

Chinese politician (born 1951)

- 栗战书
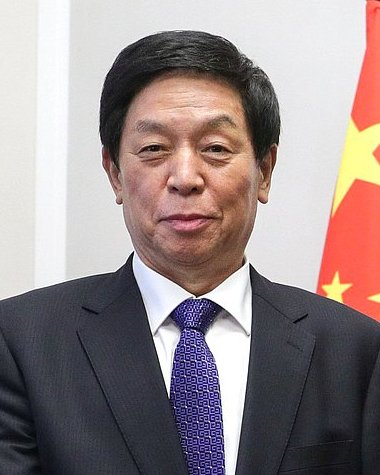
- Li in 2022

10th Chairman of the Standing Committee of the National People's Congress
- In office 17 March 2018 – 10 March 2023
- Vice Chairpersons: See list: Wang Chen; Cao Jianming; Zhang Chunxian; Shen Yueyue; Ji Bingxuan; Arken Imirbaki; Wan Exiang; Chen Zhu; Wang Dongming; Padma Choling; Ding Zhongli; Hao Mingjin; Cai Dafeng; Wu Weihua
- Secretary-General: Yang Zhenwu
- Preceded by: Zhang Dejiang
- Succeeded by: Zhao Leji

Director of the General Office of the Chinese Communist Party
- In office 31 August 2012 – 15 November 2017
- Deputy: Ding Xuexiang; Chen Shiju; Meng Xiangfeng
- General Secretary: Hu Jintao; Xi Jinping
- Preceded by: Ling Jihua
- Succeeded by: Ding Xuexiang

Party Secretary of Guizhou
- In office 8 August 2010 – 18 July 2012
- Governor: Zhao Kezhi
- Preceded by: Shi Zongyuan
- Succeeded by: Zhao Kezhi

Governor of Heilongjiang
- In office 27 January 2008 – 27 August 2010
- Preceded by: Zhang Zuoji
- Succeeded by: Wang Xiankui

Personal details
- Born: 30 August 1951 (age 74) Pingshan, Hebei, People's Republic of China
- Party: Chinese Communist Party (1975–present)
- Spouse: Wang Jinfeng
- Children: Li Qianxin (daughter); Li Duoxi (daughter)
- Education: Hebei Normal University, Harbin Institute of Technology

Chinese name
- Simplified Chinese: 栗战书
- Traditional Chinese: 栗戰書
Transcriptions
Standard Mandarin
- Hanyu Pinyin: Lì Zhànshū
- Wade–Giles: Li Chan-shu
- IPA: [lî ʈʂân.ʂú]

Li Zhanshu (Note: Chinese: 栗战书; pinyin: Lì Zhànshū) (born 30 August 1951) is a Chinese retired politician, who was the chairman of the Standing Committee of the National People's Congress from 2018 to 2023. He was the third-ranking member of the Politburo Standing Committee of the Chinese Communist Party, China's top decision-making body, between 2017 and 2022.

Born in Pingshan, Hebei, Li began his political career in rural regions of his native Hebei province, becoming the Party Secretary of Wuji County, Commissioner of Shijiazhuang in 1985, head of Chengde Prefecture in 1990, and secretary-general of the Hebei Provincial Party Committee from 1993 and 1997. He rose through the ranks becoming the Party Secretary of Xi'an in 2002, where he served until 2003. In 2008, he became the Governor of Heilongjiang, where he served until 2010. In that year, he became the Party Secretary of Guizhou province, where he served until 2012.

In 2012, he became director of the General Office of the Chinese Communist Party. After the 18th Party Congress in 2012, Li became a member of the CCP Politburo and one of the top advisors to party General Secretary Xi Jinping. In 2017, he became a member of the Politburo Standing Committee, being appointed as the chairman of the Standing Committee of the National People's Congress in 2018. He stepped down from the Politburo Standing Committee in 2022, and as NPCSC chair in 2023. He is regarded by the media as a senior member of the "Xi Jinping faction", one of the main political factions within the Chinese Communist Party.

== Early life and education ==
Li was born in Pingshan County, Hebei province on August 30, 1951. Between 1968 and 1973, he was a "sentdown youth" at an agricultural commune in his hometown county. He studied at the Shijiazhuang Institute of Commerce in Shijiazhuang from 1971 to 1973. He started his career as an ordinary functionary in Shijiazhuang, working as an office worker for the Shijiazhuang commercial bureau and later becoming its deputy director in 1971. In 1976, he became a clerk and head of the information division of the General Office of the Shijiazhuang Prefecture Party Committee. In 1980, Li studied night school at Hebei Normal University, graduating via part-time studies in 1983.

== Regional leadership ==
=== Hebei ===
After graduating, he was promoted to Party Secretary of Wuji County (at around the same time, the party chief of neighbouring Zhengding County was Xi Jinping, current General Secretary of the Chinese Communist Party). In 1985, he became the deputy party secretary and Commissioner of Shijiazhuang prefecture (not equivalent to mayor), later becoming the secretary of the Hebei Provincial Committee of the Communist Youth League of China. In 1988, he attended a six-month program on CCP theoretical work at the Central Party School. He served as the deputy party secretary and head of Chengde Prefecture from 1990 to 1993, and as the secretary-general of the Hebei Provincial Party Committee from 1993 and 1997. He also enrolled at a economics in a correspondence program at the Central Party School from 1992 to 1994. Between 1997 and 1998, he served as the deputy director of the Rural Work Office of the Provincial Party Committee.

=== Shaanxi ===
In 1998, Li was transferred to Shaanxi province to serve on its party standing committee and become the head of its provincial Organization Department. Beginning in January 2002, Li became the Party Secretary of Xi'an. In May, he concurrently took on the role of deputy party chief of Shaanxi province. During his term in Xi'an, Li was known to have set the goal for Xi'an to become the "best city in the western interior".

=== Heilongjiang ===
In December 2003, Li became Deputy Party Secretary of Heilongjiang, and assumed the post of Vice Governor about a year later. At the time, outside observers classified Li as a member of the Tuanpai, i.e., officials with a background in the Communist Youth League. On December 25, 2007, then Governor Zhang Zuoji resigned, and Li took over as acting Governor, confirmed in January 2008.

=== Guizhou ===
In August 2010, Li became the Party Secretary of Guizhou province, taking on his first role in the top office of a province. At the time, Li was not yet a full member of the Central Committee; it was considered very rare for someone to hold office as a provincial party chief without a full seat on the Central Committee.

== General Office ==
In July 2012, Li was transferred to Beijing to serve as the executive deputy director of the General Office of the Chinese Communist Party, being groomed to replace Ling Jihua. He assumed office as Director of the General Office two months later. Three months later, Li was also named Secretary of the Work Committee for Organs Directly Reporting to the Central Committee (中直工委书记). Regarded as a "rising star", Li was elected to the Politburo of the Chinese Communist Party at the 18th Party Congress held in November 2012, which was unusual for a General Office Chief (Ling Jihua, for example, was not a member of the Politburo), signaling that Li would hold significant clout under Xi Jinping's administration. Additionally, as was customary of the general office chief, Li was also named a Secretary of the Central Secretariat. In 2013, Li was also named chief of the General Office of the newly formed National Security Commission.

Li has played a major role in facilitating a strong relationship between China and Russia, and is the first General Office chief in post-Mao China to have played such an active role in foreign affairs. For example, in 2015 Li was sent as a "special envoy" of Xi Jinping to meet with Vladimir Putin in Moscow. During the 2015 Moscow Victory Day Parade held in Moscow, Li was a member of the Chinese delegation. Li was known to have accompanied Xi on the leader's various meetings with foreign guests, including on Xi's 2015 state visit to the United States.

Li, seen as one of the most influential members of Xi Jinping's inner circle, was considered a "dark horse" candidate for the 19th Politburo Standing Committee, China's top decision-making body which took office in 2017. Li was an alternate of the 16th and 17th Central Committees of the Chinese Communist Party and was a full member of the 18th Central Committee. In September 2017, Li became a deputy leader of a leading group headed by National People's Congress Standing Committee chairman Zhang Dejiang, which drafted the 2018 constitutional amendment.

== Standing Committee ==
Li was chosen to be a member of the 19th Politburo Standing Committee, China's top decision-making body, at the 1st plenary session of the 19th Central Committee of the Chinese Communist Party on 25 October 2017. On March 17, 2018, Li was elected as the Chairman of the Standing Committee of the National People's Congress.

Li represented General Secretary Xi Jinping at North Korea's 70th anniversary celebrations in 2018.

In November 2020, following the expulsion of 4 pro-democracy lawmakers in the Hong Kong Legislative Council, Li defended the expulsion, arguing that the decision was both "necessary" and "appropriate."

In September 2022, during a meeting with senior Russian figures, Li pledged China's "understanding and full support" in Russia's position on the issue of the 2022 Russian invasion of Ukraine. He said, "given the circumstances, Russia has taken necessary measures. China understands, and we are coordinating on various aspects." He went on to directly blame the United States and NATO for "expanding NATO directly on Russia's doorstep, threatening Russia's national security and the lives of Russian citizens." The Wall Street Journal reported on 19 March 2023, citing sources, that the Russians leaked this footage without Chinese knowledge, and that if China knew the situation beforehand, "its choice of words would have been more careful to prevent China from being seen as an accomplice to Russia".

Li retired from the Politburo Standing Committee after the 20th Party Congress in October 2022 and retired from politics in March 2023 after he stepped down as Chairman of the Standing Committee of the National People's Congress, which Zhao Leji succeeded.

== Personal life ==
Regarding his work, Li claims to abide by a "three-nos" principle: they are: "no messing around with other people, no playing games, no loafing on the job."

Li's great-uncle Li Zaiwen (栗再温; 1908–1967) served as Vice Governor of Shandong province.

Li's wife, Wang Jinfeng (王金凤), was born on October 30, 1953.

=== Li Qianxin ===
Li's eldest daughter, Li Qianxin (栗潜心; born 20 June 1982), also known as Naomi Li, has been reported by Chinese-language media as being active in Hong Kong, and is one of the Vice-Chairs of the Hua Jing Society, a youth organization promoting mainland-Hong Kong cooperation. Li Qianxin reportedly bought a townhouse in Hong Kong's Stanley Beach for $15 million in 2013.

According to a New York Times investigation, Li Qianxin bought a 4-story property at 6 Stanley Beach Road in the Southern District of Hong Kong Island in 2013 for US$15 million through Century Joy Holdings Ltd., a company registered in Hong Kong with Li Qianxin as the sole director, and incorporated in the British Virgin Islands. In October 2019, when The New York Times contacted her regarding a scandal involving Deutsche Bank and their illicit hiring practices, she dissolved Century Joy Holdings Ltd. within a matter of hours. Li Qianxin was found to have pushed Deutsche Bank to hire her younger sister, who was deemed unqualified for the bank's corporate communications team, but received the job offer anyway.

Her husband, Chua Hwa Por (蔡华波; born 17 May 1985), was also part of the report. Chua owned a racehorse called Limitless, and also took over a company named Tai United in early 2017, when he was appointed as chairman. Under his supervision, Tai United bought a large share in the Peninsula Hotel, as well as the entire 79th floor of a Hong Kong skyscraper (reported earlier by SCMP to be at The Center). Chua stepped down from Tai United shortly afterwards in July 2017, when Next Magazine reported on the purchases and Chua's potential ties to Li Qianxin's father, Li Zhanshu. In January 2018, Chua then sold the majority of his Tai United shares.

Together, Li Qianxin and Chua jointly own another company, named Chua & Li Membership. Li Qianxin and Chua both had listed the 6 Stanley Beach Road unit as their residence until early 2020, when Li Qianxin changed her address to another apartment Chua owns in Hong Kong, located on the 60th floor of a building.

Also according to the investigation, Li Qianxin joined networks such as the Hua Jing Society in Hong Kong, a group that networks princelings and tycoons.

In 2024, Li Qianxin was named as a member of the steering committee for the Hong Kong "Research, Academic and Industry Sectors One-plus Scheme."

=== Li Duoxi ===
Li's youngest daughter, Li Duoxi (栗多习; born 25 May 1987), works at Deutsche Bank.

== Awards and honors ==
- Order of Friendship (Russia, 2022)

== Notes ==
Assembly seats
Preceded by Zhang Dejiang	Chairmen of the Standing Committee of the National People's Congress; 2018–2023	Succeeded by Zhao Leji
Party political offices
Preceded by Ling Jihua	Director of the General Office of the Chinese Communist Party; 2012–2017	Succeeded by Ding Xuexiang
Preceded by Shi Zongyuan	Party Secretary of Guizhou; 2010–2012	Succeeded by Zhao Kezhi
Preceded by Cui Lintao	Party Secretary of Xi'an; 2002–2003	Succeeded by Yuan Chunqing
Government offices
Preceded by Zhang Zuoji	Governor of Heilongjiang; 2007–2010	Succeeded by Wang Xiankui
Order of precedence
Preceded by Li Keqiang as Premier of the State Council	3rd Ranking of the Chinese Communist Party; 19th Politburo Standing Committee	Succeeded by Wang Yang as Chairman of the CPPCC National Committee
