= Miao Chunting =

Chinese politician (1919–2020)

Miao Chunting (May 1919 – 17 September 2020, Chinese: 苗春亭) was a Chinese politician. He was born in Shan County, Shandong Province.

He was twice Chairman of the Chinese People's Political Consultative Conference Committee of Guizhou (1959–1967, 1980–1993).

== Biography ==
In 1946, he assumed the role of secretary of the CPC Kuinan County Committee and chief editor of Jiluyu Daily. Following the establishment of the People's Republic of China in 1949, he held the positions of secretary of the CPC Zunyi Prefecture Committee in Guizhou, chairman of the Federation of Trade Unions of Guizhou Province, and secretary-general of the CCP Guizhou Provincial Committee, among others. In 1956, he assumed the role of chairman of the Guizhou Provincial People's Political Consultative Conference (CPPCC). In 1973, he assumed the role of principal at the Party School of the Guizhou Provincial Committee, and in 1977, he was appointed deputy secretary of the CPC Guizhou Provincial Committee. In January 1980, he was appointed chairman of the Guizhou Provincial Committee of the Chinese People's Political Consultative Conference.

He died in Guiyang, Guizhou on September 17, 2020.

Preceded by Xu Jiansheng	Guizhou CPPCC Committee Chairman; 1959–1967	Succeeded by Vacant until 1977, then Li Baohua
Preceded by Chi Biqing	Guizhou CPPCC Committee Chairman; 1980–1993	Succeeded by Long Zhiyi
