= Liu Fangren =

Chinese politician

Party Secretary of Guizhou
- In office 1993–2001

Personal details
- Born: 1936 (age 89–90) Wugong County, Shaanxi, China
- Party: Chinese Communist Party (expelled)

Liu Fangren (Chinese: 刘方仁; born January 1936) was a Chinese politician. He was born in Wugong County, Shaanxi.

== Biography ==
He was Chinese Communist Party Committee Secretary (1993–2001) and People's Congress Chairman (1998–2002) of Guizhou. He was CPPCC Committee Chairman of Jiangxi (1993–1994). He was a delegate to the 8th National People's Congress and 9th National People's Congress. He was expelled from the party for corruption and sentenced to life in prison.

Preceded by Liu Zhengwei	Party Secretary of Guizhou; 1993–2001	Succeeded by Qian Yunlu
Preceded by Wang Chaowen	People's Congress Chairman of Guizhou; 1998–2002	Succeeded by Qian Yunlu
Preceded by Wu Ping	CPPCC Committee Chairman of Jiangxi; 1993–1994	Succeeded by Zhu Zhihong
