= Li Jiang (politician, born 1958) =

Chinese politician

- 李江

Chairperson of the Yunnan Provincial Committee of the Chinese People's Political Consultative Conference
- In office 29 January 2018 – 14 January 2023
- Preceded by: Luo Zhengfu
- Succeeded by: Liu Xiaokai

Personal details
- Born: January 1958 (age 68) Kunming, Yunnan, China
- Party: Chinese Communist Party
- Education: Kunming University of Science and Technology

Li Jiang (Chinese: 李江; pinyin: Lǐ Jiāng; born January 1958) is a Chinese politician, serving since 2018 as chairwoman of the Yunnan Provincial Committee of the Chinese People's Political Consultative Conference.

== Biography ==
Li was born in Kunming, Yunnan, in January 1958. During the Cultural Revolution, she was a sent-down youth in Huize County and then worked in a lead zinc miner factory. After resuming the college entrance examination, in 1978, she was admitted to Kunming University of Science and Technology, majoring in steelmaking. After graduation, she worked at the university's Communist Youth League.

Li joined the Chinese Communist Party (CCP) in January 1976. He served as deputy mayor of Yuxi in October 1999, and soon was promoted to the mayor position. In February 2001, she was elevated to party secretary, her first foray into a municipal leadership role. In February 2003, she was appointed head of Organization Department of Yunnan Provincial Committee of the Chinese Communist Party, and held that office until April 2008. In January 2008, she took up the post of vice governor, which she held from 2008 to 2012, although she remained head of the Organization Department until April of that same year. In June 2012, she rose to become executive vice governor. In January 2017, she became deputy chairwoman of the Yunnan Provincial Committee of the Chinese People's Political Consultative Conference, rising to chairwoman the next year.

Civic offices
Preceded by Yang Guangcheng	Secretary of Yunnan Provincial Committee of the Communist Youth League of China; 1996–1999	Succeeded by Luo Guoquan
Government offices
Preceded by Yang Chongyong	Mayor of Yuxi; 2000–2001	Succeeded by Sun Xueming (孙学明)
Preceded by Luo Zhengfu	Executive Vice Governor of Yunnan; 2012–2017	Succeeded by Zong Guoying
Party political offices
Preceded by Yang Chongyong	Communist Party Secretary of Yuxi; 2001–2003	Succeeded by Kong Xianggeng (孔祥庚)
Preceded by Qin Guangrong	Head of Organization Department of Yunnan Provincial Committee of the Chinese Communist Party; 2003–2008	Succeeded by Xin Guizi
Assembly seats
Preceded by Luo Zhengfu	Chairperson of the Yunnan Provincial Committee of the Chinese People's Political Consultative Conference; 2018–2023	Succeeded by Liu Xiaokai
