= Shen Yunpu =

Chinese politician (1916–1991)

- 申云浦

Chairman of Guizhou Provincial Committee of CPPCC
- In office February 1955 – September 1956
- Vice Chairperson: Xie Xinhe
- Succeeded by: Xu Jiansheng

Personal details
- Born: 1916 Yanggu, Shandong, China
- Died: 13 May 1991 (aged 74–75) Guizhou Provincial People's Hospital, Guizhou, China
- Party: Chinese Communist Party
- Occupation: Politician & teacher

Shen Yunpu (Chinese: 申云浦) (1916–13 May 1991) was a Chinese politician. He was born in Yanggu County, Shandong. He was Chairman of the Guizhou CPPCC Committee. Yunpu died on 13 May 1991 from an illness at Guizhou Provincial People's Hospital in Guizhou.

Preceded by New office	CPPCC Committee Chairman of Guizhou	Succeeded by Xu Jiansheng
