= Xu Jiansheng =

Xu Jiansheng (Chinese: 徐健生) (1912–1993) was a Chinese politician. He was born in Shibaxiang, Bijie, Guizhou Province. He served as vice-governor and CPPCC Committee Chairman of his home province. He was a delegate to the 1st National People's Congress, 2nd National People's Congress, 3rd National People's Congress and 7th National People's Congress.

Preceded by Shen Yunpu	CPPCC Committee Chairman of Guizhou; 1956–1959	Succeeded by Miao Chunting
Preceded by New office	Chairman of the Guizhou People's Congress; 1980–1983	Succeeded by Wu Shi
