= Li Yuecheng =

Chinese politician

- 李月成

Governor of Qiannan Buyei and Miao Autonomous Prefecture
- In office February 2007 – September 2011
- Preceded by: Liu Xiaokai
- Succeeded by: Xiang Hongqiong

Governor of Qiandongnan Miao and Dong Autonomous Prefecture
- In office March 2005 – November 2006
- Preceded by: Liu Xiaokai
- Succeeded by: Li Feiyue

Personal details
- Born: October 1957 (age 68–69) Taijiang County, Guizhou, China
- Party: Chinese Communist Party
- Education: Xingren Normal School; Central Party School of the Chinese Communist Party

Li Yuecheng (Chinese: 李月成; pinyin: Lǐ Yuèchéng; born October 1957) is a former Chinese politician who spent his career in his home province of Guizhou. He is of Miao ethnicity. He entered the workforce in March 1972 and joined the Chinese Communist Party in July 1976. He previously served as Governor of Qiandongnan Miao and Dong Autonomous Prefecture (2005–2006) and Qiannan Buyei and Miao Autonomous Prefecture (2007–2011). He later served as Director of the Agriculture and Rural Affairs Committee of the Guizhou Provincial Committee of the Chinese People's Political Consultative Conference (CPPCC). As of January 2020, he was under investigation by the Communist Party's anti-corruption agency.

== Biography ==
Li was born in Taijiang County, Guizhou, China in October 1957. In his early career, he taught at Xinzhuang School, Bihen Middle School, and Xueguan Middle School in Qinglong County.

He began his political career in March 1982, when he became a staff member at the Publicity Department of CPC Qinglong County Committee. In 1987, he was promoted to Magistrate of Pu'an County. He earned the nickname "Child Magistrate". In 1990, at the age of 30, he became Communist Party Secretary, the top political position in the county. In 1996, he became Assistant Governor of Qianxinan Buyei and Miao Autonomous Prefecture. One year later, he was promoted to Vice-Governor, a position at vice-department level (副厅级). In January 2003, he was appointed Party Branch Secretary and Deputy Director of Guizhou Supply and Marketing Association. In April of the same year, he became Party Branch Secretary and Head of the Guizhou Provincial Audit Department. He served as Deputy Communist Party Secretary and Governor of Qiandongnan Miao and Dong Autonomous Prefecture from March 2005 until November 2006. In November 2006, he was appointed Deputy Communist Party Secretary and Acting Governor, and later Governor, of Qiannan Buyei and Miao Autonomous Prefecture. He served in that role until September 2011, when he became Director of the General Office of the Guizhou Provincial Committee of the Chinese People's Political Consultative Conference (CPPCC). In January 2012, he became Secretary-General of the Guizhou Provincial Committee of the Chinese People's Political Consultative Conference (CPPCC), remaining in that position until February 2018. He was then appointed Director of the Agriculture and Rural Affairs Committee of the Guizhou Provincial Committee of the Chinese People's Political Consultative Conference (CPPCC).

He was a delegate to the 11th National People's Congress.

== Investigation ==
On January 9, 2020, he was placed under investigation for suspected "violations of discipline and laws" by the Central Commission for Discipline Inspection (CCDI), the party's internal disciplinary body, and the National Supervisory Commission, the highest anti-corruption agency in China. On January 10, 2020, he was removed from membership in the Chinese People's Political Consultative Conference, China's top political advisory body.

Party political offices
Preceded by Zhou Guocai (周国才)	Communist Party Secretary of Pu'an County; 1990–1996	Succeeded by Gong Xiuming (龚修明)
Government offices
Preceded by Liu Xiaokai	Governor of Qiandongnan Miao and Dong Autonomous Prefecture; 2005–2006	Succeeded by Li Feiyue
Preceded by Liu Xiaokai	Governor of Qiannan Buyei and Miao Autonomous Prefecture; 2007–2011	Succeeded by Xiang Hongqiong
