= Weng Fanggang =

Weng Fanggang (Chinese: 翁方綱) (1733 - 1818) was a Chinese calligrapher, literary critic, philosopher, and poet during the Qing dynasty.

A native of Beijing's Daxing District, Weng came to the attention of the Qianlong Emperor who was impressed with Weng's translation of the Peach Blossom Spring (桃花源 Tao Hua Yuan) by Tao Yuanming into the Manchu language. He was employed at court as a junior compiler, and later rose to become a member of the Grand Secretariat. Despite holding government posts in Shandong, Jiangxi and Jiangsu, Weng spend most of his professional life in Beijing, so as to be close to the literati of his day.

Weng proposed the imposition of classical rules on poetry, in an attempt to curb what he saw as the weaker, more abstract works of his contemporaries, particularly those who followed the style of Wang Yangming. He was opposed to Wang Yangming's philosophy that man had an innate goodness, as he felt this detracted from the achievements of historical saints and Confucian worthies. Despite his preference for formal structure, Weng admired the works of Li Bai and wrote passionate defences of Li Bai's work. He also favoured Su Shi's work, and named a room in his personal library after one of Su's poetry collections that Weng obtained in 1773. His views on poetry led him to create the Jili pai or "School of Musculature", a system of poetic criticism that focused on scholarly contemplation of universal patterns and structures.

Weng was also noted for his calligraphy, which was modelled after that of Ouyang Xun and Yu Shinan. He specialised in lishu script, and was regarded as having the same degree of skill as Liu Yong.
