= Su Gang =

Chinese politician

Su Gang (Chinese: 苏钢) (1920 – 30 September 2002) was a Chinese politician. He was born in Laoling County, Shandong Province (modern Laoling). He was governor of Guizhou Province and was a member of the 12th Central Committee of the Chinese Communist Party.

Preceded by Ma Li	Governor of Guizhou	Succeeded by Wang Zhaowen
