= Xiang Hongqiong =

Chinese politician

- 向红琼

Governor of Qiannan Buyei and Miao Autonomous Prefecture
- In office September 2011 – October 2016
- Preceded by: Li Yuecheng
- Succeeded by: Wu Shenghua

Personal details
- Born: November 1958 (age 67) Yuqing County, Guizhou, China
- Party: Chinese Communist Party
- Education: Guizhou University; Northwest A&F University; South China Agricultural University

Chinese name
- Simplified Chinese: 向红琼
- Traditional Chinese: 向紅瓊
Transcriptions
Standard Mandarin
- Hanyu Pinyin: Xiàng Hóngqióng

Xiang Hongqiong (Chinese: 向红琼; born November 1958) is a retired Chinese politician of Miao ethnicity who served as governor of Qiannan Buyei and Miao Autonomous Prefecture from 2011 to 2016. She was investigated by China's top anti-graft agency in March 2022. She was a delegate to the 12th National People's Congress.

== Biography ==
Xiang was born in Yuqing County, Guizhou, in November 1958. She was a sent-down youth in Lushan District of Kaili County (now Kaili City) between November 1974 and February 1977, and then worked at Kaili County Salt Industry Company. After resuming the college entrance examination, in 1979, she was accepted to Guizhou Agricultural College (now Guizhou University). After graduation in 1983, she stayed at the university and taught there.

Xiang joined the Chinese Communist Party (CCP) in July 1982, and got involved in politics in June 2002, when she was appointed vice mayor of Liupanshui. She became director and party branch secretary of Guizhou Meteorological Bureau in June 2008, and served until 2011. In September 2011, she became vice governor of Qiannan Buyei and Miao Autonomous Prefecture, rising to governor in September 2011. She became director of Ethnic and Religious Affairs Committee of the Guizhou Provincial Committee of the Chinese People's Political Consultative Conference in September 2016, serving in the post until her retirement in January 2022.

=== Downfall ===
On 17 March 2022, Xiang was put under investigation for alleged "serious violations of discipline and laws" by the Central Commission for Discipline Inspection (CCDI), the party's internal disciplinary body, and the National Supervisory Commission, the highest anti-corruption agency of China. Her predecessor Li Yuecheng was sacked for graft in January 2020. On 25 August 2022, she was formally expelled from the Chinese Communist Party and on the same month, the Anshun Municipal People's Procuratorate made a decision to arrest Xiang on suspicion of accepting bribes.

On 1 September 2023, at her trial, the Anshun Intermediate People's Court sentenced Xiang to 12 years imprisonment for bribery and fined ¥1.5 million. Xiang stated her acceptance of the verdict and her decision to not launch any appeal. Additionally, her illegally obtained assets were confiscated and handed over to the national treasury.

Government offices
Preceded by Li Yuecheng	Governor of Qiannan Buyei and Miao Autonomous Prefecture; 2011–2016	Succeeded by Wu Shenghua
