= Chi Biqing =

Chinese politician (1917–2007)

Chi Biqing (Chinese: 池必卿; 1917–2007) was a Chinese politician. He was born in Pingding County, Shanxi Province. He was Chinese Communist Party Committee Secretary and CPPCC Chairman of Guizhou. He was a member of the Central Advisory Commission, 11th Central Committee of the Chinese Communist Party and 12th Central Committee of the Chinese Communist Party.

Party political offices
Preceded by Ma Li	Party Secretary of Guizhou; 1979–1985	Succeeded by Zhu Houze
Assembly seats
Preceded by Li Baohua	CPPCC Chairman of Guizhou; 1979–1980	Succeeded by Miao Chunting
Military offices
Preceded by ?	Political Commissar of the PLA Guizhou Military District; 1980–1986	Succeeded by Kang Huzhen
