= Liu Zhengwei =

Chinese politician

Liu Zhengwei (Chinese: 刘正威; February 1930 – July 9, 2012) was a Chinese politician, best known for his term as Party Secretary of Guizhou.

== Biography ==
Liu was born in Xinzheng County, Henan. He attended Kaifeng High School. He worked for Second Mechanic Works (第二机械工业部). In 1980, he became the party chief of Nanyang, Henan. Then he was promoted to deputy provincial party chief of Henan. In 1987, he was named deputy party chief of Guizhou; the next year, he became party chief of Guizhou, succeeding Hu Jintao. He was also Chairman of the Guizhou People's Congress. In 1993, he became the deputy secretary of the Working Committee of State Organs.

Liu was a member of the 12th, 13th, and 14th Central Committees of the Chinese Communist Party.

He died on July 9, 2012, at the age of 82.

Party political offices
Preceded by Hu Jintao	Party Secretary of Guizhou Province; 1988–1993	Succeeded by Liu Fangren
