= Guizhou Provincial Committee of the Chinese Communist Party =

Guizhou Provincial Committee of the Chinese Communist Party 中国共产党贵州省委员会

Overview
- Type: Highest decision-making organ when Guizhou Provincial Congress is not in session.
- Elected by: Guizhou Provincial Congress
- Length of term: Five years
- Term limits: None
- First convocation: January 1935; 90 years ago

Leadership
- Secretary: Xu Lin
- Executive organ: Standing Committee
- Inspection organ: Commission for Discipline Inspection

Meeting place
- Guizhou Provincial Committee Building in Guiyang

Guizhou Provincial Committee of the Chinese Communist Party
- Simplified Chinese: 中国共产党贵州省委员会
- Traditional Chinese: 中國共產黨貴州省委員會
Transcriptions
Standard Mandarin
- Hanyu Pinyin: Zhōngguó Gòngchǎndǎng Guìzhōushěng Wěiyuánhuì

Abbreviation
- Simplified Chinese: 中共贵州省委
- Traditional Chinese: 中共貴州省委
- Literal meaning: CCP Guizhou Provincial Committee
Transcriptions
Standard Mandarin
- Hanyu Pinyin: Zhōnggòng Guìzhōushěng Wěi

The Guizhou Provincial Committee of the Chinese Communist Party is the provincial committee of the Chinese Communist Party (CCP) in Guizhou, China, and the province's top authority. The committee secretary is the highest ranking post in the province.

== Organizations ==
The organization of the Guizhou Provincial Committee includes:

- General Office

=== Functional Departments ===
- Organization Department
- Publicity Department
- United Front Work Department
- Political and Legal Affairs Commission
- Social Work Department
- Commission for Discipline Inspection
- Supervisory Commission

=== Offices ===
- Policy Research Office
- Office of the Cyberspace Affairs Commission
- Office of the Foreign Affairs Commission
- Office of the Deepening Reform Commission
- Office of the Institutional Organization Commission
- Office of the Military-civilian Fusion Development Committee
- Taiwan Work Office
- Office of the Leading Group for Inspection Work
- Bureau of Veteran Cadres

=== Dispatched institutions ===
- Working Committee of the Organs Directly Affiliated to the Guizhou Provincial Committee

=== Organizations directly under the Committee ===
- Guizhou Party School
- Guizhou Daily Newspaper Group
- Guizhou Institute of Socialism
- Party History Research Office
- Guizhou Provincial Archives
- Lecturer Group

=== Organization managed by the work organization ===
- Confidential Bureau

== Leadership ==
=== Heads of the Organization Department ===
Name (English)	Name (Chinese)	Tenure begins	Tenure ends	Note
Shi Yubao	时玉宝			

=== Heads of the Publicity Department ===
Name (English)	Name (Chinese)	Tenure begins	Tenure ends	Note
Lu Yongzheng	卢雍政	January 2020		

=== Secretaries of the Political and Legal Affairs Commission ===
Name (English)	Name (Chinese)	Tenure begins	Tenure ends	Note
Shi Guanghui	时光辉	November 2018		

=== Heads of the United Front Work Department ===
Name (English)	Name (Chinese)	Tenure begins	Tenure ends	Note
Guo Qiang	郭强	April 2023		

== See also ==
- Politics of Guizhou
