= Lu Ruilin =

Chinese politician and major general

Lu Ruilin (Chinese: 鲁瑞林) (1911–1999) was a Chinese politician and People's Liberation Army major general. He was born in Linxia County, Gansu Province. He was Chinese Communist Party Committee Secretary and governor of Guizhou Province.
