= Alternates of the 17th Central Committee of the Chinese Communist Party =

The 17th Central Committee of the Chinese Communist Party was elected by the 17th National Congress in 2007, with 167 individuals serving as alternates during this term.

== Alternates ==
Alternates of the 17th Central Committee of the Chinese Communist Party
| Ballot | Name | | 16th CC | 18th CC | Birth | PM | Death | Birthplace | Ethnicity | Gender | Ref. |
|---|---|---|---|---|---|---|---|---|---|---|---|
| 1 | Wang Xinxian (Note: Wang Xinxian was advanced from alternate to member of the 17th Central Committee to fill a vacant seat by a decision of the 3rd Plenary Session of the 17th Central Committee, held on 9–12 October 2008.) | 王新宪 | Nonmember | Member | 1954 | 1975 | Alive | Shanxi | Han | Male | |
| 2 | Yan Rongzhu (Note: Yan Rongzhu was advanced from alternate to member of the 17th Central Committee to fill a vacant seat by a decision of the 5th Plenary Session of the 17th Central Committee, held on 15–18 October 2010.) | 焉荣竹 | Nonmember | Nonmember | 1952 | 1971 | Alive | Shandong | Han | Male | |
| 3 | Wang Xuejun (Note: Wang Xuejun was advanced from alternate to member of the 17th Central Committee to fill a vacant seat by a decision of the 7th Plenary Session of the 17th Central Committee, held on 1–4 November 2012.) | 王学军 | Nonmember | Member | 1952 | 1975 | Alive | Hebei | Han | Male | |
| 4 | Wang Jianping (Note: Wang Jianping was advanced from alternate to member of the 17th Central Committee to fill a vacant seat by a decision of the 7th Plenary Session of the 17th Central Committee, held on 1–4 November 2012.) | 王建平 | Nonmember | Member | 1953 | — | Alive | Hebei | Han | Male | |
| 5 | Liu Shiquan | 刘石泉 | Alternate | Alternate | 1963 | 1985 | Alive | Hubei | Han | Male | |
| 6 | Du Yuxin | 杜宇新 | Alternate | Nonmember | 1953 | 1976 | Alive | Heilongjiang | Han | Male | |
| 7 | Fu Yuelan | 符跃兰 | Nonmember | Nonmember | 1953 | 1974 | Alive | Hainan | Han | Female | |
| 8 | Ma Biao | 马飚 | Nonmember | Member | 1954 | 1985 | Alive | Guangxi | Zhuang | Male | |
| 9 | Wang Guangya | 王光亚 | Nonmember | Member | 1950 | — | Alive | Jiangsu | Han | Male | |
| 10 | Danke | 旦科 | Nonmember | Alternate | 1962 | 1988 | Alive | Qinghai | Tibetan | Male | |
| 11 | Zhu Xiaodan | 朱小丹 | Nonmember | Member | 1953 | 1975 | Alive | Zhejiang | Han | Male | |
| 12 | Quan Zhezhu | 全哲洙 | Alternate | Member | 1952 | 1969 | Alive | Jilin | Korean | Male | |
| 13 | Li Yumei | 李玉妹 | Nonmember | Alternate | 1956 | 1974 | Alive | Shandong | Han | Female | |
| 14 | Zhang Lianzhen | 张连珍 | Nonmember | Nonmember | 1951 | 1973 | Alive | Jiangsu | Han | Female | |
| 15 | Lin Zuoming | 林左鸣 | Alternate | Member | 1957 | 1981 | Alive | Fujian | Han | Male | |
| 16 | Luo Zhengfu | 罗正富 | Alternate | Nonmember | 1952 | 1974 | Alive | Yunnan | Yi | Male | |
| 17 | Luo Zhijun | 罗志军 | Nonmember | Member | 1951 | 1969 | 2023 | Liaoning | Han | Male | |
| 18 | Zheng Lizhong | 郑立中 | Alternate | Nonmember | 1951 | 1978 | Alive | Fujian | Han | Male | |
| 19 | Zhao Xiangeng | 赵宪庚 | Nonmember | Alternate | 1953 | — | Alive | Shanxi | Han | Male | |
| 20 | Yuan Rongxiang | 袁荣祥 | Nonmember | Nonmember | 1955 | 1978 | Alive | Zhejiang | Han | Male | |
| 21 | Huang Jianguo | 黄建国 | Nonmember | Nonmember | 1952 | 1970 | Alive | Yunnan | Han | Male | |
| 22 | Shen Weichen | 申维辰 | Nonmember | Nonmember | 1956 | 1979 | Alive | Shanxi | Han | Male | |
| 23 | Ren Yaping | 任亚平 | Nonmember | Nonmember | 1952 | 1970 | Alive | Shanxi | Han | Male | |
| 24 | Liu Hui | 刘慧 | Nonmember | Alternate | 1959 | 1985 | Alive | Tianjin | Hui | Female | |
| 25 | Liu Zhenqi | 刘振起 | Nonmember | Nonmember | 1946 | 1966 | Alive | Hebei | Han | Male | |
| 26 | Sun Jianguo | 孙建国 | Nonmember | Member | 1952 | — | Alive | Hebei | Han | Male | |
| 27 | Li Xi | 李希 | Nonmember | Alternate | 1956 | 1975 | Alive | Gansu | Han | Male | |
| 28 | Li Maifu | 李买富 | Nonmember | Nonmember | 1946 | — | Alive | Shanxi | Han | Male | |
| 29 | Yang Gang | 杨刚 | Nonmember | Nonmember | 1953 | 1976 | Alive | Hebei | Han | Male | |
| 30 | Yang Song | 杨松 | Nonmember | Nonmember | 1950 | 1975 | Alive | Hebei | Han | Male | |
| 31 | Yu Yuanhui | 余远辉 | Nonmember | Alternate | 1964 | 1984 | Alive | Guangxi | Yao | Male | |
| 32 | Yu Xinrong | 余欣荣 | Nonmember | Nonmember | 1959 | 1982 | Alive | Jiangxi | Han | Male | |
| 33 | Zhang Chengyin | 张成寅 | Nonmember | Nonmember | 1950 | 1969 | Alive | Hebei | Han | Male | |
| 34 | Zhang Guoqing | 张国清 | Nonmember | Member | 1964 | 1984 | Alive | Henan | Han | Male | |
| 35 | Zhang Yijiong | 张裔炯 | Nonmember | Member | 1955 | 1976 | Alive | Shanghai | Han | Male | |
| 36 | Chen Cungen | 陈存根 | Nonmember | Nonmember | 1952 | 1985 | Alive | Shaanxi | Han | Male | |
| 37 | Chen Min'er | 陈敏尔 | Nonmember | Member | 1960 | 1981 | Alive | Zhejiang | Han | Male | |
| 38 | Nur Bekri | 努尔·白克力 | Nonmember | Member | 1960 | 1984 | Alive | Xinjiang | Uyghur | Male | |
| 39 | Lin Jun | 林军 | Nonmember | Member | 1949 | — | Alive | Fujian | Han | Male | |
| 40 | Luo Huining | 骆惠宁 | Nonmember | Member | 1954 | 1982 | Alive | Zhejiang | Han | Male | |
| 41 | Huang Kangsheng | 黄康生 | Nonmember | Nonmember | 1952 | 1971 | Alive | Guizhou | Buyi | Male | |
| 42 | Wei Fenghe | 魏凤和 | Nonmember | Member | 1954 | 1972 | Alive | Shandong | Han | Male | |
| 43 | Yu Gesheng | 于革胜 | Nonmember | Nonmember | 1956 | 1976 | Alive | Hubei | Han | Male | |
| 44 | Wang Weiguang | 王伟光 | Nonmember | Member | 1950 | 1972 | Alive | Shandong | Han | Male | |
| 45 | Ai Husheng | 艾虎生 | Nonmember | Alternate | 1951 | — | Alive | Henan | Han | Male | |
| 46 | Zhu Fazhong | 朱发忠 | Alternate | Nonmember | 1948 | 1971 | Alive | Gansu | Han | Male | |
| 47 | Liu Xuepu | 刘学普 | Nonmember | Alternate | 1957 | 1982 | Alive | Chongqing | Tujia | Male | |
| 48 | Liu Zhenlai | 刘振来 | Nonmember | Nonmember | 1949 | 1968 | Alive | Beijing | Hui | Male | |
| 49 | Sun Jinlong | 孙金龙 | Nonmember | Nonmember | 1962 | 1986 | Alive | Hubei | Han | Male | |
| 50 | Su Shiliang | 苏士亮 | Nonmember | Nonmember | 1950 | — | Alive | Shandong | Han | Male | |
| 51 | Li Changyin | 李长印 | Alternate | Nonmember | 1951 | 1974 | Alive | Shaanxi | Han | Male | |
| 52 | Yue Fuhong | 岳福洪 | Alternate | Nonmember | 1949 | 1972 | Alive | Beijing | Han | Male | |
| 53 | Jin Zhenji | 金振吉 | Nonmember | Alternate | 1959 | 1979 | Alive | Jilin | Korean | Male | |
| 54 | Qin Yinhe | 秦银河 | Nonmember | Alternate | 1951 | — | Alive | Henan | Han | Male | |
| 55 | Xu Yitian | 徐一天 | Nonmember | Nonmember | 1947 | — | Alive | Jilin | Han | Male | |
| 56 | Xue Yanzhong | 薛延忠 | Alternate | Nonmember | 1954 | 1981 | Alive | Shanxi | Han | Male | |
| 57 | Wang Xiankui | 王宪魁 | Nonmember | Member | 1952 | 1974 | Alive | Hebei | Han | Male | |
| 58 | Bayanqolu | 巴音朝鲁 | Nonmember | Member | 1955 | 1976 | Alive | Inner Mongolia | Mongolian | Male | |
| 59 | Ye Dongsong | 叶冬松 | Nonmember | Nonmember | 1958 | 1981 | Alive | Anhui | Han | Male | |
| 60 | Shi Lianxi | 史莲喜 | Alternate | Nonmember | 1952 | 1974 | Alive | Hebei | Han | Female | |
| 61 | Liu Xiaokai | 刘晓凯 | Nonmember | Alternate | 1962 | 1985 | Alive | Guizhou | Miao | Male | |
| 62 | Wu Dingfu | 吴定富 | Alternate | Nonmember | 1946 | 1972 | Alive | Hubei | Han | Male | |
| 63 | Zhang Geng | 张耕 | Nonmember | Nonmember | 1944 | 1979 | Alive | Shaanxi | Han | Male | |
| 64 | Zhang Jiyao | 张基尧 | Nonmember | Nonmember | 1945 | 1979 | Alive | Shandong | Han | Male | |
| 65 | Chen Baosheng | 陈宝生 | Nonmember | Member | 1956 | 1984 | Alive | Gansu | Han | Male | |
| 66 | Miao Wei | 苗圩 | Nonmember | Member | 1955 | 1984 | Alive | Hebei | Han | Male | |
| 67 | Lin Mingyue | 林明月 | Alternate | Nonmember | 1947 | 1985 | Alive | Taiwan | Han | Female | |
| 68 | Zhao Aiming | 赵爱明 | Nonmember | Alternate | 1961 | 1985 | Alive | Henan | Han | Female | |
| 69 | Hu Zejun | 胡泽君 | Nonmember | Member | 1955 | 1976 | Alive | Chongqing | Han | Female | |
| 70 | Hu Zhenmin | 胡振民 | Nonmember | Nonmember | 1946 | — | Alive | Hebei | Han | Male | |
| 71 | Xian Hui | 咸辉 | Nonmember | Alternate | 1958 | 1976 | Alive | Gansu | Han | Female | |
| 72 | Yuan Jiajun | 袁家军 | Nonmember | Nonmember | 1962 | 1992 | Alive | Jilin | Han | Male | |
| 73 | Xi Zhongchao | 息中朝 | Alternate | Nonmember | 1947 | 1966 | Alive | Hebei | Han | Male | |
| 74 | Xu Lejiang | 徐乐江 | Nonmember | Alternate | 1959 | 1976 | Alive | Shandong | Han | Male | |
| 75 | Xu Fenlin | 徐粉林 | Nonmember | Member | 1953 | — | Alive | Jiangsu | Han | Male | |
| 76 | Huang Xingguo | 黄兴国 | Alternate | Member | 1954 | 1973 | Alive | Zhejiang | Han | Male | |
| 77 | Shen Yiqin | 谌贻琴 | Nonmember | Alternate | 1959 | 1985 | Alive | Guizhou | Bai | Female | |
| 78 | Wang Yupu | 王玉普 | Nonmember | Member | 1956 | 1985 | 2020 | Liaoning | Han | Male | |
| 79 | Wang Guosheng | 王国生 | Nonmember | Member | 1956 | 1975 | Alive | Shandong | Han | Male | |
| 80 | You Quan | 尤权 | Nonmember | Member | 1954 | 1973 | Alive | Hebei | Han | Male | |
| 81 | Li Jincheng | 李金城 | Nonmember | Alternate | 1963 | 1988 | 2022 | Anhui | Han | Male | |
| 82 | Xiao Gang | 肖钢 | Nonmember | Member | 1958 | 1981 | Alive | Jiangxi | Han | Male | |
| 83 | Xiao Yaqing | 肖亚庆 | Nonmember | Nonmember | 1959 | 1981 | Alive | Hebei | Han | Male | |
| 84 | He Lifeng | 何立峰 | Nonmember | Alternate | 1955 | 1981 | Alive | Guangdong | Han | Male | |
| 85 | Zhang Shibo | 张仕波 | Nonmember | Member | 1952 | — | Alive | Zhejiang | Han | Male | |
| 86 | Zhang Xiaogang | 张晓刚 | Nonmember | Nonmember | 1954 | 1973 | Alive | Liaoning | Han | Male | |
| 87 | Jin Zhuanglong | 金壮龙 | Nonmember | Alternate | 1964 | 1984 | Alive | Zhejiang | Han | Male | |
| 88 | Hu Xiaolian | 胡晓炼 | Nonmember | Alternate | 1958 | — | Alive | Hubei | Han | Female | |
| 89 | Bai Chunli | 白春礼 | Alternate | Member | 1953 | 1974 | Alive | Liaoning | Manchu | Male | |
| 90 | Dorjee | 多吉 | Nonmember | Nonmember | 1953 | 1996 | Alive | Tibet | Tibetan | Male | |
| 91 | Liu Wei | 刘伟 | Nonmember | Nonmember | 1958 | 1980 | Alive | Shandong | Han | Male | |
| 92 | Liu Weiping | 刘伟平 | Nonmember | Member | 1953 | 1975 | Alive | Heilongjiang | Han | Male | |
| 93 | Liu Yuejun | 刘粤军 | Alternate | Member | 1954 | 1972 | Alive | Shandong | Han | Male | |
| 94 | Jiang Zelin | 江泽林 | Nonmember | Nonmember | 1959 | 1985 | Alive | Anhui | Han | Male | |
| 95 | Li Ke | 李克 | Nonmember | Nonmember | 1956 | 1975 | Alive | Guangxi | Zhuang | Male | |
| 96 | Li Andong | 李安东 | Nonmember | Nonmember | 1946 | 1973 | Alive | Shaanxi | Han | Male | |
| 97 | Leng Rong | 冷溶 | Nonmember | Member | 1953 | 1983 | Alive | Shandong | Han | Male | |
| 98 | Chen Run'er | 陈润儿 | Nonmember | Alternate | 1957 | 1975 | Alive | Hunan | Han | Male | |
| 99 | Lu Xinshe | 鹿心社 | Nonmember | Member | 1956 | 1985 | Alive | Shandong | Han | Male | |
| 100 | Xie Heping | 谢和平 | Nonmember | Nonmember | 1956 | — | Alive | Hunan | Han | Male | |
| 101 | Wang Rulin | 王儒林 | Nonmember | Member | 1953 | 1973 | Alive | Henan | Han | Male | |
| 102 | Shi Dahua | 石大华 | Alternate | Nonmember | 1951 | 1969 | Alive | Hubei | Han | Male | |
| 103 | Ye Xiaowen | 叶小文 | Alternate | Member | 1950 | 1975 | Alive | Chongqing | Han | Male | |
| 104 | Ji Lin | 吉林 | Nonmember | Alternate | 1962 | 1984 | Alive | Shanghai | Han | Male | |
| 105 | Su Shulin | 苏树林 | Alternate | Member | 1962 | 1985 | Alive | Shandong | Han | Male | |
| 106 | Li Kang | 李康 | Nonmember | Alternate | 1957 | 1981 | Alive | Guangxi | Zhuang | Female | |
| 107 | Li Chongxi | 李崇禧 | Nonmember | Nonmember | 1951 | 1975 | Alive | Sichuan | Han | Male | |
| 108 | Yang Liwei | 杨利伟 | Nonmember | Nonmember | 1965 | — | Alive | Liaoning | Han | Male | |
| 109 | Yang Huanning | 杨焕宁 | Nonmember | Member | 1957 | 1977 | Alive | Shandong | Han | Male | |
| 110 | Zhang Xuan | 张轩 | Alternate | Alternate | 1958 | 1979 | Alive | Hebei | Han | Female | |
| 111 | Chen Zhenggao | 陈政高 | Nonmember | Member | 1952 | 1972 | Alive | Liaoning | Han | Male | |
| 112 | Wu Jihai | 武吉海 | Nonmember | Nonmember | 1953 | 1979 | Alive | Hunan | Miao | Male | |
| 113 | Xiang Junbo | 项俊波 | Nonmember | Member | 1957 | — | Alive | Chongqing | Han | Male | |
| 114 | Shu Xiaoqin | 舒晓琴 | Alternate | Alternate | 1956 | 1977 | Alive | Jiangxi | Han | Female | |
| 115 | Zhan Wenlong | 詹文龙 | Nonmember | Alternate | 1955 | — | Alive | Fujian | Han | Male | |
| 116 | Pan Yunhe | 潘云鹤 | Alternate | Nonmember | 1946 | 1974 | Alive | Zhejiang | Han | Male | |
| 117 | Dao Linyin | 刀林荫 | Nonmember | Alternate | 1959 | 1987 | Alive | Yunnan | Dai | Female | |
| 118 | Wang Rong | 王荣 | Nonmember | Alternate | 1958 | 1976 | Alive | Jiangsu | Han | Male | |
| 119 | Tang Tao | 汤涛 | Nonmember | Alternate | 1962 | 1984 | Alive | Hubei | Han | Male | |
| 120 | Li Jiheng | 李纪恒 | Alternate | Member | 1957 | 1976 | Alive | Guangxi | Han | Male | |
| 121 | Song Airong | 宋爱荣 | Alternate | Nonmember | 1959 | 1981 | Alive | Henan | Han | Female | |
| 122 | Zhang Jie | 张杰 | Nonmember | Alternate | 1958 | — | Alive | Hebei | Han | Male | |
| 123 | Chen Zuoning | 陈左宁 | Nonmember | Alternate | 1957 | — | Alive | Beijing | Han | Female | |
| 124 | Zhu Yanfeng | 竺延风 | Alternate | Alternate | 1961 | 1982 | Alive | Zhejiang | Han | Male | |
| 125 | Luo Lin | 骆琳 | Nonmember | Nonmember | 1955 | 1976 | Alive | Liaoning | Han | Male | |
| 126 | Tie Ning | 铁凝 | Alternate | Member | 1957 | 1975 | Alive | Hebei | Han | Female | |
| 127 | Chu Yimin | 褚益民 | Nonmember | Member | 1953 | 1973 | Alive | Jiangsu | Han | Male | |
| 128 | Cai Yingting | 蔡英挺 | Nonmember | Member | 1954 | — | Alive | Fujian | Han | Male | |
| 129 | Xing Yuanmin | 邢元敏 | Nonmember | Nonmember | 1948 | 1974 | Alive | Chongqing | Han | Female | |
| 130 | Li Hongzhong | 李鸿忠 | Alternate | Member | 1956 | 1976 | Alive | Shandong | Han | Male | |
| 131 | Chen Chuanping | 陈川平 | Nonmember | Alternate | 1962 | 1985 | Alive | Shanxi | Han | Male | |
| 132 | Mei Kebao | 梅克保 | Nonmember | Alternate | 1957 | 1979 | Alive | Hunan | Han | Male | |
| 133 | Cao Qing | 曹清 | Nonmember | Alternate | 1952 | — | Alive | Hebei | Han | Male | |
| 134 | Jiao Huancheng | 焦焕成 | Nonmember | Member | 1949 | 1969 | Alive | Shanxi | Han | Male | |
| 135 | Lei Chunmei | 雷春美 | Nonmember | Alternate | 1959 | 1978 | Alive | Fujian | She | Female | |
| 136 | Zhai Huqu | 翟虎渠 | Alternate | Nonmember | 1950 | 1971 | Alive | Jiangsu | Han | Male | |
| 137 | Ding Yiping | 丁一平 | Alternate | Nonmember | 1951 | 1970 | Alive | Hunan | Han | Male | |
| 138 | Min Weifang | 闵维方 | Alternate | Nonmember | 1950 | 1970 | Alive | Heilongjiang | Han | Male | |
| 139 | Guo Shuqing | 郭树清 | Nonmember | Member | 1956 | 1984 | Alive | Inner Mongolia | Han | Male | |
| 140 | Wang Xia | 王侠 | Alternate | Member | 1954 | 1974 | Alive | Shaanxi | Han | Female | |
| 141 | Chen Yuan | 陈元 | Alternate | Nonmember | 1945 | 1975 | Alive | Jiangsu | Han | Male | |
| 142 | Chen Deming | 陈德铭 | Nonmember | Nonmember | 1949 | 1974 | Alive | Shanghai | Han | Male | |
| 143 | Jiang Jianqing | 姜建清 | Alternate | Alternate | 1953 | 1983 | Alive | Shanghai | Han | Male | |
| 144 | Guo Shengkun | 郭声琨 | Alternate | Member | 1954 | 1973 | Alive | Jiangxi | Han | Male | |
| 145 | Dong Wancai | 董万才 | Nonmember | Nonmember | 1947 | 1976 | Alive | Anhui | Han | Male | |
| 146 | Cai Zhenhua | 蔡振华 | Nonmember | Alternate | 1961 | 1997 | Alive | Jiangsu | Han | Male | |
| 147 | Wang Mingfang | 王明方 | Alternate | Nonmember | 1952 | 1974 | 2016 | Heilongjiang | Han | Male | |
| 148 | Shen Suli | 沈素琍 | Nonmember | Alternate | 1958 | 1979 | Alive | Jiangsu | Han | Female | |
| 149 | Zhang Daili | 张岱梨 | Nonmember | Alternate | 1954 | 1974 | Alive | Shandong | Han | Female | |
| 150 | Chen Quanguo | 陈全国 | Nonmember | Member | 1955 | 1976 | Alive | Henan | Han | Male | |
| 151 | Ulan | 乌兰 | Nonmember | Alternate | 1962 | 1984 | Alive | Inner Mongolia | Mongolian | Female | |
| 152 | Fu Zhifang | 付志方 | Nonmember | Nonmember | 1956 | 1982 | Alive | Henan | Han | Male | |
| 153 | Xia Baolong | 夏宝龙 | Alternate | Member | 1952 | 1973 | Alive | Tianjin | Han | Male | |
| 154 | Wang Anshun | 王安顺 | Nonmember | Member | 1957 | 1984 | Alive | Henan | Han | Male | |
| 155 | Wu Xianguo | 吴显国 | Nonmember | Nonmember | 1956 | 1980 | Alive | Hebei | Han | Male | |
| 156 | Zhang Ruimin | 张瑞敏 | Alternate | Alternate | 1949 | 1976 | Alive | Shandong | Han | Male | |
| 157 | Zhao Yong | 赵勇 | Nonmember | Alternate | 1963 | 1982 | Alive | Hunan | Han | Male | |
| 158 | Li Zhanshu | 栗战书 | Alternate | Member | 1950 | 1975 | Alive | Hebei | Han | Male | |
| 159 | Che Jun | 车俊 | Nonmember | Member | 1955 | 1973 | Alive | Anhui | Han | Male | |
| 160 | Jiang Jiemin | 蒋洁敏 | Nonmember | Member | 1955 | 1976 | Alive | Shandong | Han | Male | |
| 161 | Wang Xiaochu | 王晓初 | Nonmember | Alternate | 1958 | — | Alive | Shandong | Han | Male | |
| 162 | Liu Yuping | 刘玉浦 | Alternate | Nonmember | 1949 | 1971 | Alive | Shandong | Han | Male | |
| 163 | Wang Sanyun | 王三运 | Alternate | Member | 1952 | 1979 | Alive | Shandong | Han | Male | |
| 164 | Yin Yicui | 殷一璀 | Alternate | Nonmember | 1950 | 1973 | Alive | Zhejiang | Han | Female | |
| 165 | Lou Jiwei | 楼继伟 | Nonmember | Member | 1950 | 1973 | Alive | Zhejiang | Han | Male | |
| 166 | Liu Zhenya | 刘振亚 | Nonmember | Nonmember | 1952 | 1984 | Alive | Shandong | Han | Male | |
| 167 | Jia Ting'an | 贾廷安 | Nonmember | Member | 1952 | — | Alive | Henan | Han | Male | |
