= Liu Guozhi =

Officer in the Chinese army

- 刘国治

st

Chairperson of the Science and Technology Committee of the Central Military Commission
- In office January 2016 – 2021
- Preceded by: New title
- Succeeded by: Zhao Xiaozhe

Director of the Science and Technology Committee of the People's Liberation Army General Armaments Department
- In office July 2014 – January 2016
- Preceded by: Li Andong
- Succeeded by: Position revoked

Personal details
- Born: November 1960 (age 65) Jin County, Liaoning, China
- Party: Chinese Communist Party
- Education: Tsinghua University

Military service
- Allegiance: China
- Branch/service: People's Liberation Army Ground Force
- Years of service: ?–present
- Rank: Lieutenant general
- Scientific career
- Fields: Microwave
- Workplaces: Northwest Institute of Nuclear Technology

Chinese name
- Simplified Chinese: 刘国治
- Traditional Chinese: 劉國治
Transcriptions
Standard Mandarin
- Hanyu Pinyin: Liú Guózhì

Liu Guozhi (Chinese: 刘国治; born November 1960) is a lieutenant general in the People's Liberation Army of China, and an academician of the Chinese Academy of Sciences. He is a member of the 19th Central Committee of the Chinese Communist Party. He is a representative of the 19th National Congress of the Chinese Communist Party.

== Biography ==
Liu was born in Jin County (now Linghai), Liaoning, in November 1960. He earned a bachelor's degree in 1983, a master's degree in 1986, and a doctor's degree in 1992, all from Tsinghua University.

He worked at Northwest Institute of Nuclear Technology between 1986 and 2002, what he was deputy commander and commander of China Nuclear Test Base. In December 2010, he rose to become deputy head of the People's Liberation Army General Armaments Department. In September 2014, he became director of its Science and Technology Committee, replacing Li Andong. In January 2016, he became chairperson of the Science and Technology Committee of the Central Military Commission, and held that office until 2021.

== Honours and awards ==
- 2009 Member of the Chinese Academy of Sciences (CAS)

Military offices
Preceded by Li Andong	Director of the Science and Technology Committee of the People's Liberation Army General Armaments Department; 2014–2016	Succeeded by Position revoked
New title	Chairperson of the Science and Technology Committee of the Central Military Commission; 2016–2021	Succeeded by Zhao Xiaozhe
