= Wang Min (politician, born 1956) =

Chinese politician (born 1956)

- 王敏

Communist Party Secretary of Jinan
- In office December 2011 – December 2014
- Deputy: Yang Luyu (杨鲁豫, Mayor)
- Preceded by: Yan Rongzhu
- Succeeded by: Wang Wentao

Personal details
- Born: November 1956 (age 69) Jiyang, Shandong, China
- Party: Chinese Communist Party (1975–2015, expelled)
- Education: Shandong Normal University

Wang Min (Chinese: 王敏; pinyin: Wáng Mǐn; born November 1956) is a Chinese politician from eastern China's Shandong province. He served as the Communist Party Secretary of Jinan, the top political position in the provincial capital, between 2011 and 2014.

In December 2014 Wang was placed under investigation by the Communist Party's anti-corruption agency. Wang was the first provincial-ministerial official from Shandong province to be investigated in the province since the nationwide anti-graft campaign began in 2012. Wang was an alternate of the 18th Central Committee of the Chinese Communist Party.

== Biography ==
Wang was born and raised in Jiyang County, Shandong. In June 1974, during the Cultural Revolution, he was sent down to the countryside, to spend time performing manual labour in Dongchangfu District of the city of Liaocheng. He then successively served in minor leadership roles on his production brigade and then became deputy party chief of the town of Zhulaozhuang.

He attended Shandong Normal University from 1978 to 1982, graduating with a bachelor's Degree in law.

Beginning in 1982, he served in several posts in research office of the Shandong Provincial Committee of the Chinese Communist Party, eventually rising to become deputy director, then director of the office. There he performed routine policy research for the party in its economics department and "comprehensive department." In December 1991, he was transferred to Jinan, capital of Shandong province, and worked at the General Office of the Shandong Provincial Party Committee. By June 1998, Wang had become the deputy Secretary-General of the provincial party committee, and one of the top secretaries working under then Shandong Chinese Communist Party Committee Secretary Zhang Gaoli.

Wang then successively served as head of the Publicity Department of Shandong Provincial Committee, Deputy Secretary-General, and was promoted to the Chinese Communist Party Provincial Standing Committee in January 2005. He became the provincial party committee's Secretary-General in October 2006. This position, essentially analogous to chief of staff to the party secretary, was in charge of implementing party policy in the province as well as overseeing administrative affairs. It was one of the highest ranking positions in the province.

As he had a background in propaganda, Wang was named a producer and "chief supervisor" of a 2008 TV series, Journey to the Northeast (《闯关东》), and was one of the lyricists for the award-winning program when he was head of the Publicity Department of Shandong Provincial Committee.

In December 2011, Wang became the Communist Party Secretary of Jinan, the top political post in the provincial capital, while retaining his seat on the province's top governing body. In early 2014, as the anti-corruption campaign was just beginning to sweep through China, Wang warned other officials to "remain clean" and that if they make mistakes, "no one can save them."

On December 18, 2014, state media reported that he was being investigated by the CCP's Central Commission for Discipline Inspection for "serious violations of laws and regulations". The party investigation concluded that Wang had abused his power to secure promotions to subordinates and further the business interests of his family and his associates, and took "massive bribes." Wang was the first major official from Shandong province implicated in the anti-corruption campaign that began in 2013. Wang was expelled from CCP on February 17, 2015, and his case moved to judicial authorities for prosecution. Wang Min was sentenced to 12 years on September 30, 2016.

Party political offices
| Preceded by Yan Rongzhu | Head of Publicity Department of Shandong Provincial Committee of the Chinese Communist Party; 2005–2006 | Succeeded by Zhu Zhengchang |
| Preceded by Yang Chuansheng | Secretary General of Shandong Provincial Committee of the Chinese Communist Party; 2006–2012 | Succeeded by Lei Jianguo |
| Preceded by Yan Rongzhu | Communist Party Secretary of Jinan; 2011–2014 | Succeeded by Wang Wentao |
