= 2010 Asian Para Games opening ceremony =

The 2010 Asian Para Games opening ceremony was held at 8:00pm China Standard Time (UTC+8) on 12 December in the Guangdong Olympic Stadium. The ceremony's artistic section "A Beautiful World" (美丽的世界) was supervised by director-in-chief Zhu Jianwei, one of assistant director to Zhang Yimou for the 2008 Summer Paralympics opening and closing ceremonies and included more than 4600 performers, among whom 300 were disabled. Zhu described the ceremony as an emotional event which highlighted the power of love, family and people with a disability.

The opening ceremony was attended by Chinese Vice Premier Li Keqiang, President of Asian Paralympic Committee Dato' Zainal Abu Zarin and President of the International Paralympic Committee Philip Craven. Some 60,000 spectators watched the ceremony inside the stadium.

== Entry of dignitaries ==
The ceremony began with the entry into the stadium of Li Keqiang, Dato' Zainal Abu Zarin and other distinguished guests.

== Preluding sequence ==
Entitled "Running" (奔跑), the first sequence began with hundreds of performers running onto the stadium holding large LED flower props and rearranging themselves to recreate the emblem of these Asian Para Games, a coloured window panel (Xiguan glass) featuring the outline of a running athlete. Next, a giant LED model of this running athlete, suspended by wires, gradually descended to the centre of the stadium, signalling the start of the ceremony with a countdown.

The flag of the People's Republic of China was carried into the stadium by a visually impaired boy, He Yuxuan accompanied by his mother. The flag was handed over to eight soldiers from the People's Liberation Army. He Yuxuan then touched the flag with his hands before the soldiers carried the flag to the flag podium in a slow, goose-stepping march. The flag was raised accompanied by the Chinese national anthem.

== Parade of nations ==
Some of the mothers of the athletes competing at the games and more than 300 mothers of Chinese children with a disability first paraded into the stadium. The mothers lined the pathway holding flowers, the games' mascot Fun Fun and banners to cheer for the entering athletes. The sequence of entry was determined by the alphabetical order of the IOC code of each nation with Afghanistan being the first nation to enter. The host nation China was the last to enter. During the parade, Chinese pop music was played to liven the mood.

== Speeches ==
Four dignitaries then walked onto the podium at the centre of the stadium. They were:

- Dato' Zainal Abu Zarin, President of Asian Paralympic Committee
- Liu Peng, the President of the GAPGOC (2010 Guangzhou Asian Para Games Organising Committee) and President of the Chinese Olympic Committee
- Huang Huahua, the Executive President of the GAPGOC and Governor of Guangdong Province
- Wang Xinxian, the Executive President of the GAPGOC and President of the Chinese Paralympic Committee

Wang Xinxian, Huang Huahua and Liu Peng made each made speeches in Chinese highlighting the auspicious and historic nature of the games and welcomed athletes and visitors to Guangzhou. They also thanked the contributions of governments, organisers, volunteers and the people of Guangzhou. Each expressed their desires for a successful event. Dato' Zainal Abu Zarin made a speech in English, making occasional remarks in Malaysian and Chinese. He described these games as a "benchmark" for future events and praised the "unwaivering support" of the Chinese people. Abu Zarin acknowledged the work of the Chinese Paralympic Committee, GAPGOC and all levels of Chinese government. He thanked the sponsors, volunteers and the people of Guangzhou and congratulated the participating athletes. Afterwards, Li Keqiang, Vice Premier of China, formally opened the 2010 Asian Para Games.

The flag of the Asian Paralympic Committee was carried into the stadium by eight Chinese Paralympic gold-medal athletes. This was accompanied by the official games theme song "Sailing with Sunshine" performed by Liao Changyong and Liu Fei. The flag was raised along with the playing of the anthem of the Asian Paralympic Committee.

The athlete's oath was taken by Chinese athlete Li Duan while the judge's oath as taken by Malaysian referee Yeoh Keat Chye.

== A beautiful world ==
The first part was entitled "Aspirations" (心声). A fictional girl by the name of Zhenzhen, a deaf-mute person (the actor Shi Shuyin also has the same condition), used sign language to display her desire to speak and to be heard by her parents. Next, performers throughout the arena displayed a series of choreographed hand gestures in sign language. A large suspended platform carrying a woman and a girl, both dressed in yellow, gently rises from the ground. Simultaneously, numerous LED screens outlining pairs of hands magically rose from the stadium. Eighty children from a school for the blind in Guangzhou were brought onto the stadium along with eighty able-bodied children signifying the need for friendship and respect between disabled and non-disabled people. A number of seagull models hung from wire emerged and they lifted red, green and blue ribbons representing the Asian Para Games high into the sky. Finally, six images of sign language hand gestures on a metal frame were created using fireworks. The meaning of the gestures was "sunlight, love, life"

The next part was called "Pursuing the Dream" (追梦). The sequence opened with the visually impaired boy He Yuxuan playing the piano with his mother at his side. In the background, a conversation between Zhenzhen and her mother occurred where Zhenzhen remarked that she cannot hear the piano. Numerous flowers props adorned with LED lights appeared in the background with a ballerina performing in the centre. The weird colours and shapes represented the imagined world and artistic expressions of the blind. Performers dressed as butterflies descended while children dressed as frogs hopped around the stadium. A song was then performed by Chinese singer Tang Can.

The last part was called "Flying" (飞翔). This part began with a vigorous dance featuring Zhai Xiaowei (a man who has lost leg) and Ma Li (a woman who has lost an arm). Around 800 male performers each holding two wheels, representing either a wheelchair or wings, performed a series of dynamic choreographed movements. Next, 20 people in wheelchairs moved into the centre followed by a flying model of a phoenix carrying a little girl. This performance symbolised the ideals and aspirations of people with a disability. Another song was performed by Sun Yue and Sha Baoliang.

The Asian Para Games flame entered the stadium and was relayed around the stadium by 9 athletes as well as by Zhenzhen.

The torch bearers, in order, were:

- Chen Qi (silver medalist at the First Asian Wheelchair Basketball Championships)
- Huang Jiehua (captain of the Guangdong Paralympic swim team and gold medallist at numerous national championships)
- Wu Yancong (Paralympic gold medallist in high jump)
- Shan Zilong (Paralympic gold medallist in rowing)
- Li Hedong (gold medallist in World Shooting Championships)
- Xiao Yanhong (Paralympic gold medallist in archery)
- Zhenzhen and family
- Zhang Lixin (China May 4th Youth Medallist and Paralympic gold medallist in athletics)
- Zhang Haiyuan (Outstanding Athlete of the Chinese Paralympic Team and Paralympic gold medallist in athletics)

The final two torchbearers Zhang Lixin and Zhang Haiyuan, both without a left leg, then began to climb up a man-made cliff alternately. One of them would climb up a small distance while the other one held onto the torch, then the torch would be handed over allowing the latter to climb. The process continued until both torchbearers reached the summit of the 'mountain'. The torch was then placed in a container which was wound up to the base of the spiral-shaped cauldron. Finally, the cauldron was lit. The song "The Glory of Life" (生命的辉煌) performed by various artists and an extensive fireworks display concluded the ceremony.
