= Zhao Yong (politician) =

Chinese politician (born 1963)

Zhao Yong 赵勇

Deputy Communist Party Secretary of Hebei
- In office November 2011 – October 2016
- Party Secretary: Zhou Benshun; Zhao Kezhi
- Preceded by: Fu Zhifang
- Succeeded by: Li Ganjie

Personal details
- Born: January 1963 (age 63) Yiyang, Hunan, China
- Party: Chinese Communist Party
- Education: Hunan Water Works and Hydroelectric College

Zhao Yong (Chinese: 赵勇; pinyin: Zhào Yǒng; born January 1963) is a Chinese politician. Zhao is a career politician with extensive experience in the Communist Youth League, and previously served as the party chief of Tangshan, the executive vice governor of Hebei, and the Chinese Communist Party Deputy Committee Secretary of Hebei. Zhao was a controversial figure who was criticized for his role in the censorship of the Bingdian column of the Youth League's flagship newspaper, and for a massive project he undertook in Caofeidian that ended in failure.

== Biography ==
Zhao Yong was born in Yiyang, Hunan in 1963. He attended Hunan Water Works and Hydroelectric College, earning a college diploma. He was assigned by the state to work in Li County, Hunan, where he began working for a town administrative office. In 1985 he entered the department of civil affairs in Hunan province. In 1988 he entered Hunan University and earned a Master of Business Administration. In November 1991, he became deputy chief of the Hunan Communist Youth League (CYL) organization. In 1994 he entered the central organization of the CYL, eventually joining the CYL Secretariat; he served under CYL leaders Li Keqiang and Zhou Qiang. While at the Youth League he earned a doctorate in business administration at Renmin University of China.

=== Bingdian controversy ===
Bingdian (冰点) is a column published on the China Youth Daily, the flagship newspaper of the Communist Youth League. While the column was popular with the newspaper's readership, some articles published on the column earned scorn from the Central Publicity Department of the Chinese Communist Party and officials within the Youth League. In July 2004, author and China Youth Daily columnist Lu Yuegang published an article criticizing Zhao Yong alleging that Zhao had been unduly interfering in the contents of the column. The conflict between the newspaper publishers, Zhao Yong, and other authorities eventually led to the suspension of the column on the newspaper.

=== Caofeidian controversy ===
In November 2005, the 42-year-old Zhao joined the Hebei provincial Party Standing Committee, leaving the CYL organization. He first served as head of the provincial Publicity Department, before being transferred to become party chief of Tangshan. During his stint as the top official of Tangshan, Zhao devoted his energy into massive development of the Caofeidian area of the city, trumpeting it as the "number one project in the province." Zhao advocated for the creation of a 30 billion yuan "start-up fund" to develop the area, and said the area would attract over 300 billion yuan worth of investment. He also spearheaded plans to create an agricultural-commercial bank, the listing of Caofeidian assets on the public stock exchange, and organizing a state-directed Caofeidian investment company. In the end all projects failed to come to fruition and the Caofeidian investments were largely regarded as a failure; many local officials resigned due to the development project being unable to afford the tens of millions of yuan in daily interest accumulated on the debt.

=== Hebei leadership ===
The Caofeidian project, however, did not sputter Zhao's political career. In October 2010, Zhao was named executive vice governor of Hebei, the second-highest ranked government executive position in the province; then a year later, was elevated to the even more prestigious position of Chinese Communist Party Deputy Committee Secretary of Hebei province, overseeing party affairs and the provincial party school. During his vice governorship, Zhao suggested that the counties of Hebei province surrounding Beijing adopt an "economic circle" approach, powering off the economic growth in the capital region; it is not clear if his vision was implemented.

On September 25, 2013, Zhao appeared on the China Central Television (CCTV) program Point as part of a democratic life meeting held by the provincial CCP leadership. At the meeting, Hebei CCP chief Zhou Benshun said, "Comrade Zhao Yong is a self-starter and is confident and enthusiastic, but he often does things in haste, and is too concerned about the scale and superficial showiness of his projects; this can lead to a departure from reality."

After Ling Jihua was removed from office on corruption charges, Zhao, who was commonly associated with the Communist Youth League, was interviewed by the media about his thoughts on the matter. Zhao looked irritated when approached by journalists and said, "don't interview me about this matter."

Zhao was relieved of his duties as Hebei CCP committee secretary in October 2016 without the phrase lingyou renyong (roughly, "has been transferred to another assignment") included in the announcement, prompting speculation about his fate. Over a month later, it was announced that he would become the deputy director of the National Administration of Sports, a move interpreted as a demotion. Zhao was an alternate of the 17th and 18th Central Committee of the Chinese Communist Party.
