= Wang Wanbin =

Chinese politician

Wang Wanbin (Chinese: 王万宾; July 1949 -) is a politician of the People's Republic of China and served as vice secretary-general of the National People's Congress.

== Biography ==
Born in Yangquan, Shanxi Province, Wang started working in October 1969 and joined the Chinese Communist Party (CCP) in November 1974. He graduated from the CPC Central Party School in July 1996 with a postgraduate degree, majoring in economic management. He is a senior economist.

Wang served at Ma'anshan Iron and Steel Group Co., Ltd in Anhui Province for many years. In August 1994, he was transferred to the Ministry of Metallurgical Industry, and in April 1996, he became the vice Minister. In June 1999, Wang was appointed vice Minister of the State Economics and Trade Commission. In July 2001, Wang became the vice chairman and vice Party chief of the Guangxi Zhuang Autonomous Region. In February 2004, he became the executive vice secretary of the CCP Liaoning committee. Since December 2005, Wang has served as the executive vice secretary-general of the standing committee of the National People's Congress.

Wang was a member of the 17th and 18th Central Committee of the Chinese Communist Party.
