= Sun Xiaoqun =

Chinese politician

Sun Xiaoqun (Chinese: 孙晓群; July 10, 1944 - ) is a politician of the People's Republic of China. He served as the executive vice secretary of the Work Committee for Offices directly under the Central Committee of the Chinese Communist Party.

Born in Dingzhou, Hebei, Sun started working in September 1967, and joined the Chinese Communist Party (CCP) in December 1973. From September 1962 to September 1967, Sun studied at the department of petroleum exploration of the Beijing Institute of Petroleum. He then served in various posts in the Ministry of Petroleum. In September 1990, Sun became the vice director and later, director of the department of personnel of Xinhua News Agency in Hong Kong. In July 1996, he served as the assistant to the president of Xinhua News Agency in Hong Kong. In May 1999, Sun was appointed secretary-general of the Organization Department of the Chinese Communist Party. He was promoted to vice director of the Central Organization Department in June 2000. Since July 2004, Sun has served as the executive vice secretary of the Work Committee for Offices directly under the Central Committee of the Chinese Communist Party, and deputy head of the education advancement campaign leading group of the CCP.

Sun was a member of the 17th Central Committee of the Chinese Communist Party.
