= Li Shouxin (politician) =

Chinese politician (born 1954)

Li Shouxin (Chinese: 李守信; pinyin: Lǐ Shǒuxìn, born October 1954 in Hejian) is a Chinese politician who has been serving as party secretary of Shandong University since October 2011.

Academic offices
Preceded by Zhu Zhengchang	Party Secretary of Shandong University; 2011–present	Incumbent
