= Kang Rixin =

Chinese politician

Kang Rixin (Chinese: 康日新; born August 1953) is a Chinese former nuclear engineer and politician. He served as chief manager of China National Nuclear Corporation (CNNC) and was a member of the 17th Central Committee of the Chinese Communist Party. He was sentenced to life imprisonment in 2010 for corruption.

== Biography ==
Kang was born in Datong, Shanxi, China and graduated from the department of nuclear engineering of Shanghai Jiaotong University in August 1978. He joined the Chinese Communist Party (CCP) in December 1982. In January 2005, he graduated from the graduate school of the CCP Central Party School, majoring in economics management. In June 2005, he obtained an EMBA certificate from Tsinghua University. He is a senior engineer at the researcher level.

From 2003 to 2009, he managed the China National Nuclear Corporation (CNNC), before being accused of corruption and bribery. Kang was sentenced to life imprisonment and confiscation of his possessions by a Beijing court in 2010 because he accepted about one million US dollars in bribes between 2004 and 2009.

Kang was a member of the 17th Central Committee of the Chinese Communist Party from 2007. He was expelled from the CCP after his bribery conviction.
