= Tan Ruisong =

Chinese engineer, executive and politician (born 1962)

- 谭瑞松

Chairman of the Aviation Industry Corporation of China
- In office 7 May 2018 – March 2023
- Preceded by: Lin Zuoming
- Succeeded by: Zhou Xinmin

General Manager of the Aviation Industry Corporation of China
- In office March 2012 – May 2018
- Preceded by: Lin Zuoming
- Succeeded by: Luo Ronghuai

Personal details
- Born: February 1962 (age 64) Jilin City, Jilin, China
- Party: Chinese Communist Party (expelled in 2025)
- Education: Beihang University; Harbin Engineering University

Chinese name
- Simplified Chinese: 谭瑞松
- Traditional Chinese: 譚瑞松
Transcriptions
Standard Mandarin
- Hanyu Pinyin: Tán Ruìsōng

Tan Ruisong (Chinese: 谭瑞松; born February 1962) is a former Chinese executive and engineer. He was investigated by China's top anti-graft agency in August 2024. Previously he served as chairman and party branch secretary of the Aviation Industry Corporation of China, China's dominant aircraft maker. He was a member of the 13th National Committee of the Chinese People's Political Consultative Conference.

== Early life and education ==
Tan was born in Jilin City, Jilin, in February 1962, while his ancestral home in You County, Hunan. He received his bachelor's degree from Beihang University in 1983, and his master's degree in naval architecture and marine engineering in 2002 and doctor's degree in management science and engineering in 2006 from Harbin Engineering University.

== Career ==
Tan began his career at Harbin Dong'an Automotive Engine Manufacturing Company (now Harbin Dong'an Auto Engine Co., Ltd.) since 1983. He moved up the ranks to become deputy chief engineer in September 1994, deputy general manager in June 1995, and general manager in August 1998.

Tan was chairman and party secretary of Harbin Aviation Industry (Group) Co., Ltd. in April 2004 and subsequently deputy general manager of AVIC II in September of that same year.

In July 2008, Tan became deputy general manager of the Aviation Industry Corporation of China, rising to general manager in March 2012. In March 2018, he was chosen as chairman and party branch secretary of the company, and held that office until March 2023.

== Downfall ==
On 30 August 2024, Tan was suspected of "serious violations of laws and regulations" by the Central Commission for Discipline Inspection (CCDI), the party's internal disciplinary body, and the National Supervisory Commission, the highest anti-corruption agency of China.

On 24 February 2025, Tan was expelled from the CCP and his benefits revoked.

On 25 March 2026, Tan was sentenced by the Dalian Intermediate People's Court to death sentence with reprieve for corruption, taking bribes and insider trading.

Business positions
Preceded by Lin Zuoming	General Manager of the Aviation Industry Corporation of China; 2012–2018	Succeeded by Luo Ronghuai
Preceded by Lin Zuoming	Chairman of the Aviation Industry Corporation of China; 2018–2023	Succeeded by Zhou Xinmin
