= Global Energy Interconnection =

Long-term grid proposal

The Global Energy Interconnection is a proposed global electricity network (Super grid).

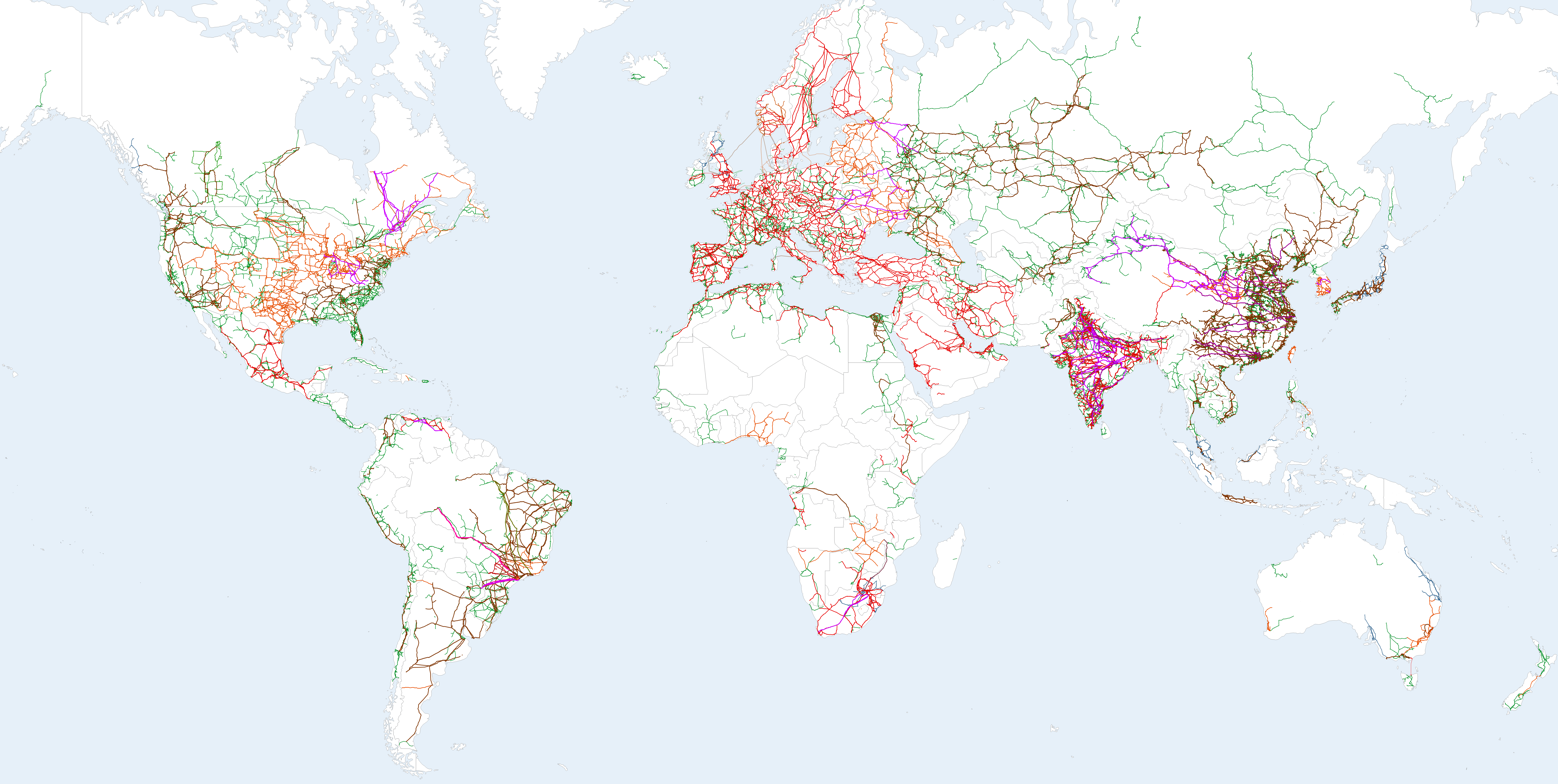
World map of high voltage transmission lines with more than 220 kV

== Idea Conception ==
The proposal is an eighteen-line backbone of ultra high voltage connections to link 80 countries in networks incorporating smart-grid technology and significant renewable energy sources. The scope of the proposal spans 50 years. The first phase focuses on integrating national grids, building new smart grids, and increasing renewable energy usage. The second phase would connect continental grids. The third phase, proposed for the period 2030 to 2070, would develop Afro-Eurasian transcontinental grids linked by ultra high voltage systems.

The idea was conceived by State Grid Corporation of China (SGCC), and put forward by SGCC Chairman Liu Zhenya, at a workshop on November 12, 2015. Chinese leader Xi Jinping supports the proposal and has linked it to the principle of ecological civilization and highlighted it in international forums including a 2015 speech before the UN General Assembly. China seeks to gain support for the GEI in forums including the UN Framework Convention on Climate Change, the UN 2030 Agenda for Sustainable Development, and at the Gulf Cooperation Council.

== See also ==
- Energy policy of China
- Belt and Road Initiative
