= Wang Wentao =

Chinese politician (born 1964)

- 王文涛
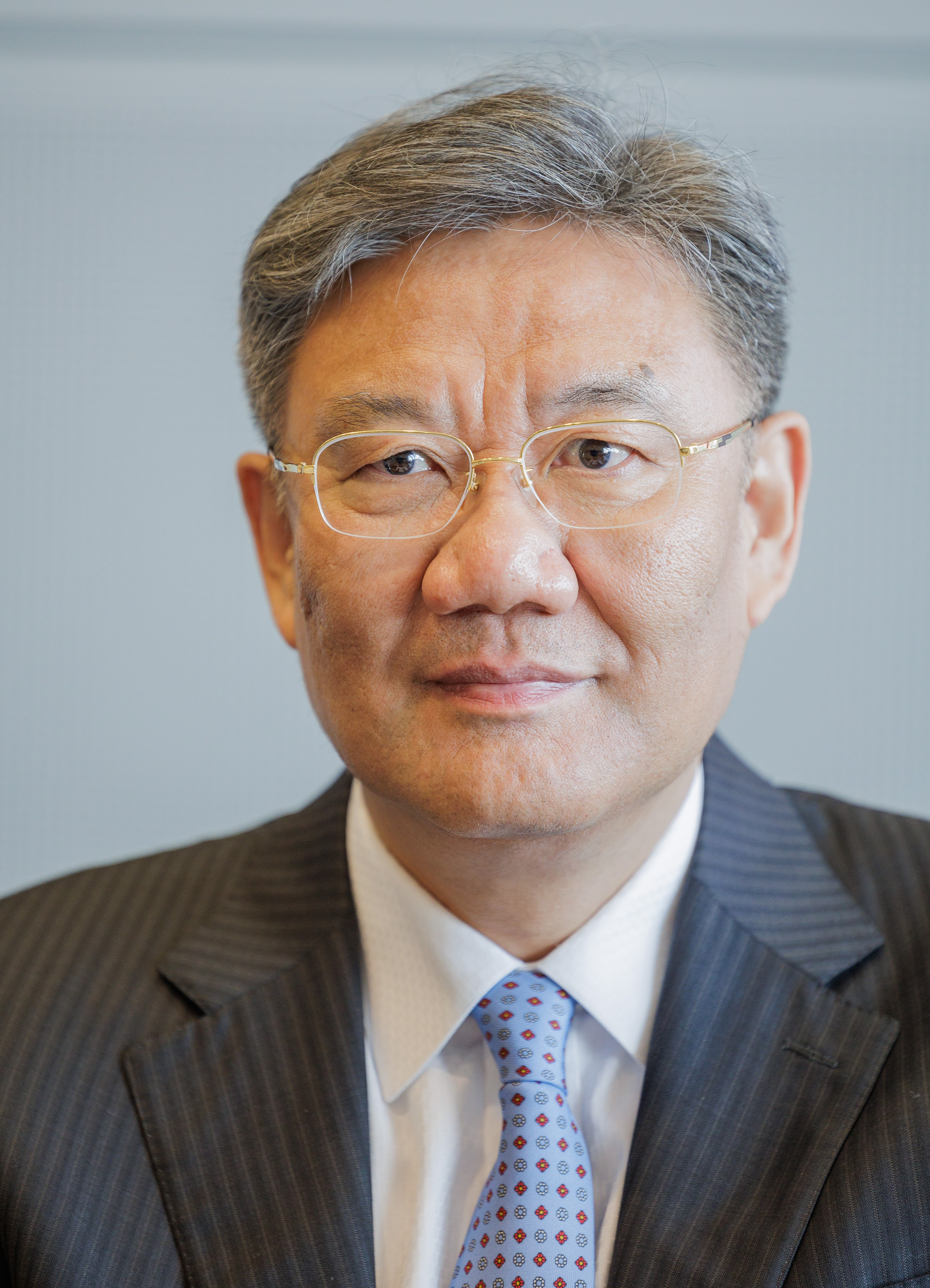
- Wang in 2024

Minister of Commerce
- Incumbent
- Assumed office 26 December 2020
- Premier: Li Keqiang (2020–2023); Li Qiang (since 2023)
- Preceded by: Zhong Shan

Governor of Heilongjiang
- In office March 2018 – December 2020
- Preceded by: Lu Hao
- Succeeded by: Hu Changsheng

Party Secretary of Jinan
- In office March 2015 – March 2018
- Preceded by: Wang Min
- Succeeded by: Wang Zhonglin

Personal details
- Born: May 1964 (age 62) Nantong, Jiangsu
- Party: Chinese Communist Party (1994–present)
- Education: Fudan University (BPhil)

Wang Wentao (simplified Chinese: 王文涛; traditional Chinese: 王文濤; pinyin: Wáng Wéntāo; born May 1964) is a Chinese politician who has been Minister of Commerce since December 2020. He formerly served as Communist Party Secretary of Jinan and Deputy Party Secretary of Shandong province.

== Early life and career ==
Wang was born in 1964 in Nantong, Jiangsu province. He attended Fudan University in Shanghai, graduating with a degree in philosophy. He joined the Chinese Communist Party (CCP) in December 1994. After graduation he worked as an instructor at career institute of the Shanghai Academy of Spaceflight Technology; he also served as the head of the Communist Youth League organization at the institute, as well as the managing the sales of photocopying machines. He was later transferred to work as mayor of the town of Wuku in the Songjiang District, then promoted to party chief of Liugang. Then he served as deputy governor of Songjiang District in Shanghai and head of urban planning; he was also in charge of industrial development, the technology park, and export growth.

In January 2005, Wang was then transferred to Kunming to become deputy party chief, then mayor. Then he was transferred back to Shanghai to serve as deputy party chief and later governor of Huangpu District. In April 2011 he was named a provincial Party Standing Committee member of Jiangxi and party chief of the provincial capital Nanchang.

In March 2015, Wang was named Party Secretary of Jinan and joined the Shandong Shengwei Changwei; he replaced Wang Min, who was dismissed for corruption. In April 2017, Wang was named deputy party chief of Shandong. On 26 March 2018, he was appointed acting Governor of Heilongjiang province, replacing Lu Hao. He was confirmed as Governor on 15 May.

== Minister of Commerce ==
Wang was appointed Minister of Commerce in December 2020. In October 2022, after the 20th CCP National Congress, Wang was appointed as a full member of the CCP Central Committee. Wang was previously an alternate of the 18th and the 19th Central Committees of the CCP.

In January 2024, Wang promoted the commerce ministry's commitment to the "Made in China" strategy while acknowledging the challenges of attracting foreign inventors. He also stated that the ministry would not shy away from "unreasonable sanctions and suppression".

=== Foreign relations ===
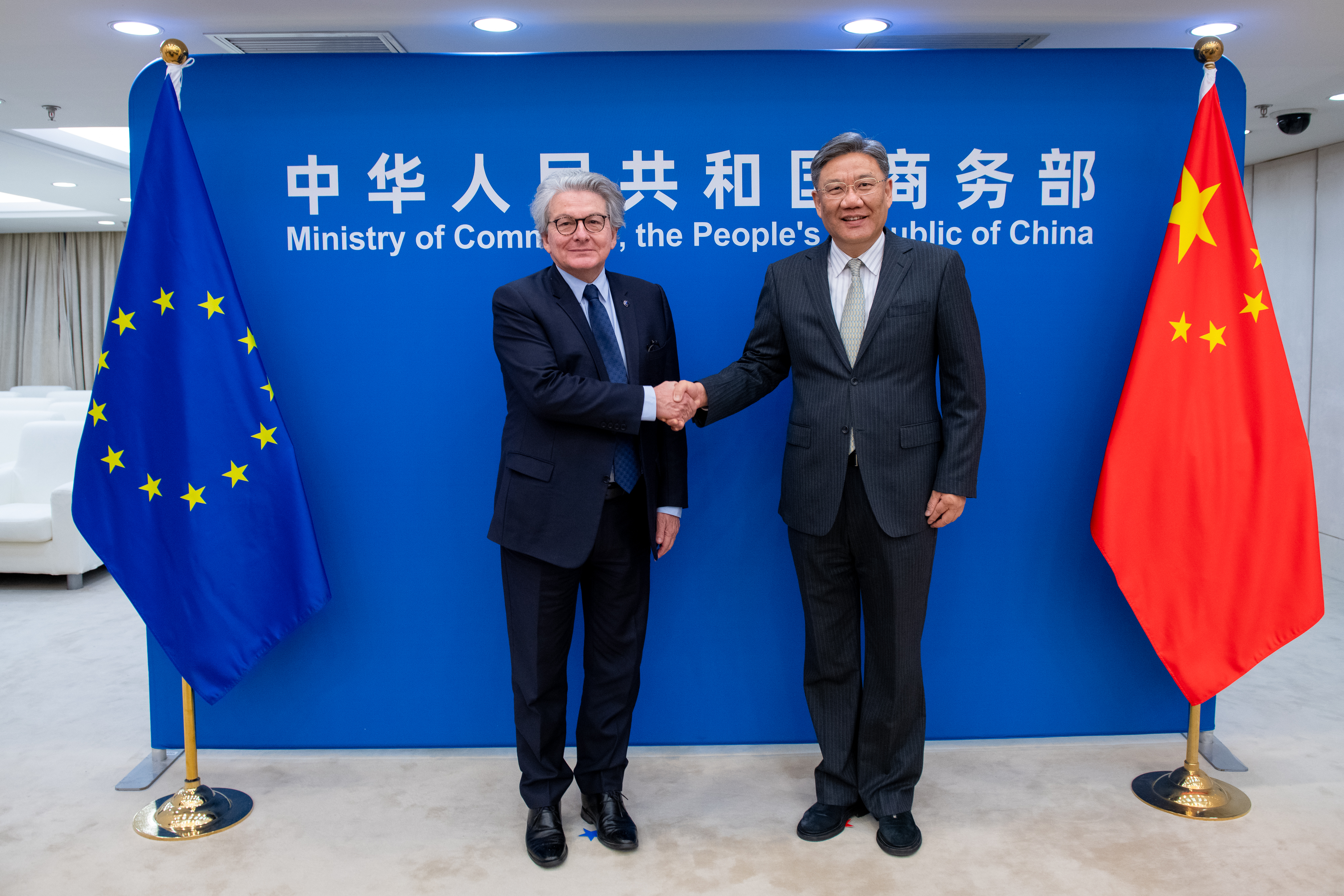
Wang with EU Commissioner Thierry Breton, November 2023

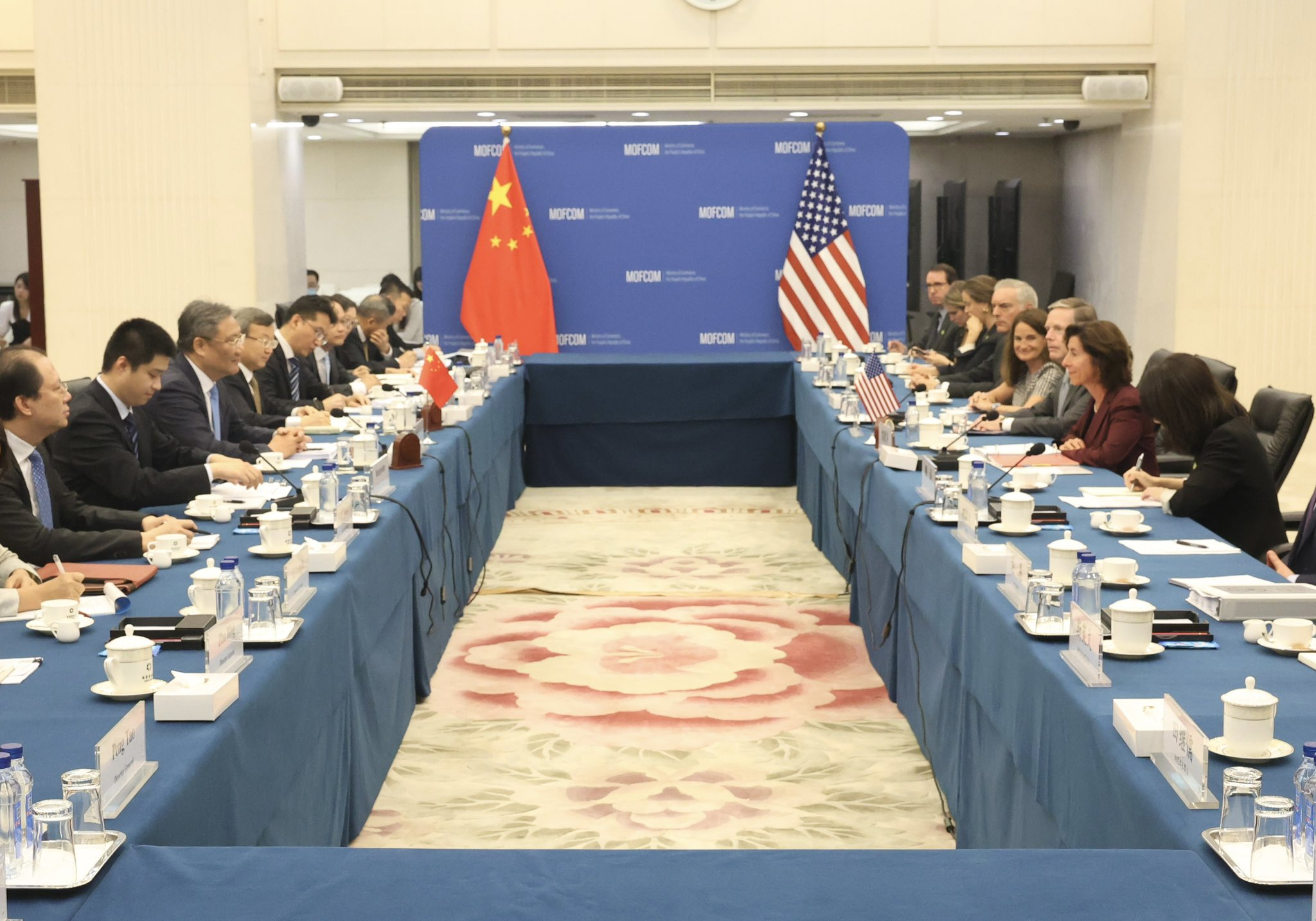
Wang with US Commerce Secretary Gina Raimondo during trade discussions in Beijing, 2023

In August 2023, Wang met with US Commerce Secretary Gina Raimondo in Beijing. Both of them agreed to exchange information on export controls amid US restrictions of semiconductor chips to Chinese companies. In April 2024, during a roundtable discussion in Paris along with representatives from more than ten Chinese companies including BYD, Wang stated that the rise of Chinese electric vehicles (EVs) was not because of Chinese government subsidies but "constant innovation" from carmakers. He also said that the allegations of "overcapacity" were "groundless" and "without merit". The roundtable discussion centered around the anti-subsidy probe led by the European Union. In October 2024, he conducted a phone call with US Commerce Secretary Raimondo raising the issue of EV tariffs imposed by the Biden administration. Raimondo, meanwhile, noted concerns on China's decreasing regulatory transparency.

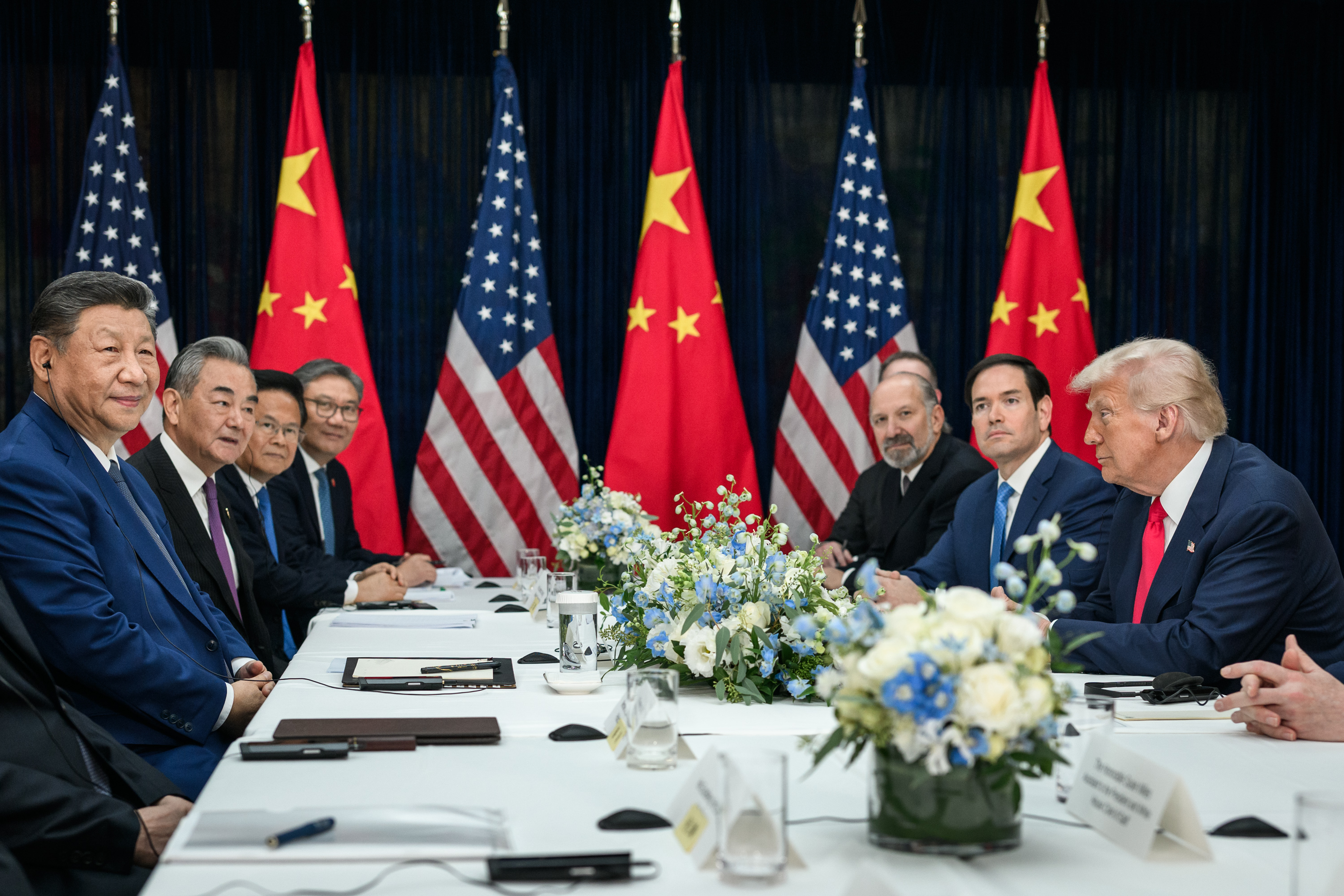
Wang (fourth person from the left) during talks between US President Donald Trump and Chinese leader Xi Jinping at the APEC summit in Busan, October 2025

In early February 2025, the United States placed a 10 percent tariff on Chinese imports to reduce fentanyl flow, blaming China for exporting precursor chemicals. Wang criticized the tariff, noting previous cooperation between the US and China on fentanyl control. In March 2025, he vowed to "fight to the finish" declaring that China would not be intimidated by US tariffs. That same month, the Commerce Ministry started an anti-circumvention investigation into US fiber optic imports and announced to impose additional 15% tariffs on American farm products. In June 2025, Wang urged the World Trade Organization (WTO) to enhance oversight on tariffs. Due to escalation of the trade war with the Trump administration, he encouraged Chinese companies operating in the US to make diversified strategies noting protectionism concerns.

As a result of the Dutch-China standoff over Nexperia, Wang received an "urgent" invitation from the European Union to discuss solution in Brussels. Both he and Dutch Economy Minister Vincent Karremans met in October 2025. Wang was described as less conciliatory over the issue stating that China opposed the overstretching of "national security" concerns as China blocked the exportation of the company's finished products to the Netherlands.

Government offices
Preceded by Zhong Shan	Minister of Commerce; 2020–	Incumbent
Preceded by Lu Hao	Governor of Heilongjiang; 2018–2020	Succeeded by Hu Changsheng
Party political offices
Preceded by Wang Min	Party Secretary of Jinan; 2015–2018	Succeeded by Wang Zhonglin
Preceded by Gong Zheng	Deputy Party Secretary of Shandong; 2017–2018	Succeeded by Yang Dongqi
