= Yang Yanyin =

Chinese politician

Yang Yanyin (Chinese: 杨衍银; born December 1947) is a Chinese politician. She currently serves as the executive vice secretary of the Work Committee of the Central Government Departments of the Central Committee of the Chinese Communist Party.

Born in Xintai, Shandong Province, Yang joined the Chinese Communist Party (CCP) in 1971, and graduated from the department of economics of Shandong University, majoring in management. She formerly served in a textile mill in Pingyin County, as vice Party chief of Pingyin, and as vice director of the personnel bureau of Shandong. Beginning in 1983, she served as a standing committee member of the CCP Shandong committee, vice director of the organization department of Shandong, and the chairperson of the Shandong Women's Association. In February 1990, Yang was elevated to a secretary of the secretariat of the All-China Women's Federation. In December 1990, she became the vice president of the Federation. She was elected to be a standing committee member of the 8th National People's Congress in March, 1993.

In July, 1993, Yang was appointed vice Minister of Civil Affairs. Since November 2004, Yang has served as the executive vice secretary of the Work Committee of the Central Government Departments of the CCP Central Committee.

She is a current member of the 17th Central Committee of the Chinese Communist Party.
