= 17th Central Committee of the Chinese Communist Party =

2007–2012 Central Committee

17th Central Committee
- Emblem of the Chinese Communist Party

22 October 2007 – 15 November 2012

Leadership
- General Secretary: Hu Jintao
- Inner-groups: Politburo Standing Committee: 9 members Politburo: 25 members Secretariat: 7 members Military Commission: 7 members

Candidates

Apparatus
- No. of departments: 4

The 17th Central Committee of the Chinese Communist Party was elected by the 17th Congress on 21 October 2007, and sat until the 18th National Congress in 2012. The 17th Central Committee is composed of full members and alternate members. It was followed by the 18th Central Committee of the Chinese Communist Party.

== Plenums ==
Plenum	Start–end	Length	Summary
1st Plenary Session	22 October 2007	1 day	Hu Jintao was elected General Secretary and CMC Chairman. A 25-members Politburo, a 9-members Politburo Standing Committee and a 6-members Secretariat with Xi Jinping as first-ranking secretary were elected. He Guoqiang was appointed Secretary of the Central Commission for Discipline Inspection.
2nd Plenary Session	25–27 February 2008	3 days	The meeting approved lists of nominees for top State posts and leading posts of the 11th National People's Congress and the 11th National Committee of the Chinese People's Political Consultative Conference.
3rd Plenary Session	9–12 October 2008	4 days	Hu Jintao delivered a report on behalf of the Politburo, and a Decision of the CCP Central Committee on Rural Reform and Development setting basic goals for rural reform by 2020 submitted by Hui Liangyu was approved.
4th Plenary Session	15–18 September 2009	4 days	Hu Jintao delivered a report on behalf of the Politburo, Xi Jinping submitted the Decision of the CCP Central Committee on Major Issues on Strengthening and Improving Party Building under the New Circumstances. The focus was "on continuing to emancipate the mind, persisting in reform and opening up, promoting scientific development and social harmony".
5th Plenary Session	15–18 October 2010	4 days	Hu Jintao delivered a report on behalf of the Politburo, Wen Jiabao submitted the CCP Central Committee's Proposal for Formulating the 12th Five-Year Program for China's Economic and Social Development (2011–2015). Xi Jinping was appointed a vice-chairman of the Central Military Commission. Former manager of the China National Nuclear Corporation Kang Rixin was expelled from the Party for corruption and graft.
6th Plenary Session	15–18 October 2011	4 days	Hu Jintao delivered a report on behalf of the Politburo, Li Changchun submitted to the plenum's discussion the CCP Central Committee's Decision on Important Issues for Deepening Cultural Reform and Promoting Development of Socialist Culture. It was decided that the 18th National Congress was to bo convened in the second half of 2012.
7th Plenary Session	1–4 November 2012	4 days	Hu Jintao delivered a report on behalf of the Politburo. The date of the 18th National Congress was set to 8 November 2012, and a draft Political Report as well as proposed amendments to the CCP Constitution were disclosed. The Politburo decisions of 28 September 2012 of expelling Bo Xilai from the Party, as well as the expulsion of former railway minister Liu Zhijun, were approved by the plenum. Fan Changlong and Xu Qiliang were appointed CMC vice chairmen.

== Working Organs ==
=== Heads of department-level institutions ===
Institution	Name (Hanzi)	Year of Birth	Took office	Left office	Tenure
Central Commission for Discipline Inspection Organs	He Guoqiang 贺国强	1943	22 October 2007	15 November 2012	5 years and 24 days
Central International Liaison Department	Wang Jiarui 王家瑞	1949	22 October 2007	15 November 2012	5 years and 24 days
Central Organization Department	Li Yuanchao 李源潮	1950	22 October 2007	15 November 2012	5 years and 24 days
Central Policy Research Office	Wang Huning 王沪宁	1955	22 October 2007	15 November 2012	5 years and 24 days
Central Political and Legal Affairs Commission	Zhou Yongkang 周永康	1942	22 October 2007	15 November 2012	5 years and 24 days
Central Publicity Department	Liu Yunshan 刘云山	1947	22 October 2007	15 November 2012	5 years and 24 days
Central Taiwan Task Office	Chen Yunlin 陈云林	1941	22 October 2007	June 2008	223 days
Central Taiwan Task Office	Wang Yi 王毅	1953	September 2008	15 November 2012	4 years and 75 days
Central United Front Work Department	Liu Yandong 刘延东	1945	22 October 2007	December 2007	40 days
Central United Front Work Department	Du Qinglin 杜青林	1946	December 2007	15 November 2012	4 years and 350 days
General Office	Ling Jihua 令计划	1956	22 October 2007	15 November 2012	5 years and 24 days
General Office of the Central Institutional Organization Commission	Wang Dongming 王东明	1956	22 October 2007	15 November 2012	5 years and 24 days
General Office of the Central Institutional Organization Commission	Zhang Jinan 张纪南	1957	22 October 2007	15 November 2012	5 years and 24 days
General Office of the Central Leading Group for Financial and Economic Affairs	Zhu Zhixin 朱之鑫	1949	22 October 2007	15 November 2012	5 years and 24 days
General Office of the Foreign Affairs Leading Group	Dai Bingguo 戴秉国	1941	22 October 2007	15 November 2012	5 years and 24 days
General Office of the State Council	Hua Jianmin 华建敏	1940	22 October 2007	18 March 2008	148 days
General Office of the State Council	Ma Kai 马凯	1946	18 March 2008	15 November 2012	4 years and 242 days
International Communications Office	Cai Wu 蔡武	1949	22 October 2007	18 March 2008	148 days
International Communications Office	Wang Chen 王晨	1950	18 March 2008	15 November 2012	4 years and 242 days
Working Committee of Organs Directly Under the Central Committee	Ling Jihua 令计划	1956	22 October 2007	15 November 2012	5 years and 24 days

=== Heads of Institutions Directly Under the Central Committee ===
Institution	Name (Hanzi)	Year Born	Took office	Left office	Tenure
Central Compilation and Translation Bureau	Wei Jianhua 韦建桦	1946	22 October 2007	February 2010	2 years and 102 days
Central Compilation and Translation Bureau	Yi Junqing 衣俊卿	1958	February 2010	15 November 2012	2 years and 288 days
Central Literature Research Office	Teng Wensheng 滕文生	1940	22 October 2007	December 2007	40 days
Central Literature Research Office	Leng Rong 冷溶	1953	December 2007	15 November 2012	4 years and 350 days
Central Party History Research Centre	Long Xinmin 龙新民	1946	22 October 2007	18 October 2011	3 years and 361 days
Central Party History Research Centre	Ouyang Song 欧阳淞	1948	18 October 2011	15 November 2012	1 year and 28 days
Central Party School	Xi Jinping 习近平	1953	22 October 2007	15 November 2012	5 years and 24 days
China Executive Leadership Academy, Jinggangshan	Li Yuanchao 李源潮	1950	22 October 2007	15 November 2012	5 years and 24 days
China Executive Leadership Academy, Pudong	Li Yuanchao 李源潮	1950	22 October 2007	15 November 2012	5 years and 24 days
China Executive Leadership Academy, Yan'an	Li Yuanchao 李源潮	1950	22 October 2007	15 November 2012	5 years and 24 days
Guangming Daily	Gou Tianlin 苟天林	1948	22 October 2007	March 2010	2 years and 130 days
Guangming Daily	He Zhanfan 胡占凡	1955	March 2010	15 November 2012	2 years and 259 days
People's Daily	Zhang Yannong 张研农	1948	22 October 2007	28 April 2008	189 days
People's Daily	Wu Hengquan 吴恒权	1948	28 April 2008	15 November 2012	4 years and 201 days
People's Daily	Cai Mingzhao 蔡名照	1955	1 November 2012	15 November 2012	14 days
Qiushi	Li Baoshan 李宝善	1955	22 October 2007	June 2008	223 days
Qiushi	Zhang Xiaolin 张晓林	—	June 2008	15 November 2012	4 years and 167 days

== Membership ==
Legend

Keys
♀	Indicates that the individual is female.
↑	Indicates that the individual was elevated from alternate to member at the 4th Plenary Session.
♮	Indicates that the individual was expelled from the Communist Party after CCDI (Note: Central Commission for Discipline Inspection) investigation.
∞	Indicates that the individual retired from active political positions (Note: An active political position is considered to be any post in the party apparatus or the government. In other words, a position in the National People's Congress of the Chinese People's Political Consultative Conference is not considered "active".) during their term on the Central Committee
§	Indicates that the individual is military personnel.
↔	Indicates that the individual is military personnel and retired from active service during their term on the Central Committee
Note	If two keys are used in the same column it indicates that the individual is both of something. For instance, "♀§" indicates that the individual is female (♀) and military personnel (§).

=== Members ===
Notes:

- The Listing column is listed in accordance with the official ordering.

Listing	Name Hanzi	Year Born	Keys	Ethnicity	Work history	Rank	Portrait	CIM (Note: Central institution membership, which in this instance means membership in the PSC, (Note: Standing Committee of the Political Bureau) PB, (Note: Political Bureau) ST (Note: Secretariat of the Chinese Communist Party) and CMC (Note: Central Military Commission)) & CCDI membership
1	Yu Youjun (Note: Yu Youjun was Governor of Shanxi prior to the 17th Party Congress, but was sacked in the aftermath of the Shanxi slave labour scandal; he then became party group secretary of the Ministry of Culture, but was never made Minister. He underwent investigation by the Central Commission for Discipline Inspection and was placed on 2-year party membership probation, the most serious penalty for a party member short of an expulsion, and lost his seat on the Central Committee.) 于幼军	1953	♮	Han	Party Group Secretary, Ministry of Culture (2007–2008)	PM (Note: Provincial-Ministerial)	—	—
2	Wei Liucheng 卫留成	1946	—	Han	Chairman, Hainan People's Congress (2007–2012); Secretary, Hainan Provincial Committee (2006–2011); Governor of Hainan (2006–2007)	PM	—	—
3	Xi Jinping 习近平	1953	—	Han	Vice President (2008–2012); Vice Chairman, Central Military Commission (2010–2012); President, Central Party School	NL (Note: National Leader)	—	PSC, PB, ST, CMC
4	Ma Wen 馬馼	1948	♀	Han	Minister of Supervision; Director, National Bureau of Corruption Prevention; Deputy Secretary, Central Commission for Discipline Inspection	PM	—	—
5	Ma Kai 馬凱	1946	—	Han	President, Chinese Academy of Governance; Secretary-General, State Council; Chairman, National Development and Reform Commission (2007–2008)	PM		SC
6	Ma Xiaotian 马晓天	1949	§	Han	Deputy Head, People's Liberation Army General Staff Department	Gen. (Note: General)		—
7	Wang Gang 王刚	1942	—	Han	Vice Chairman, National Committee of the Chinese People's Political Consultative Conference	DNL (Note: Deputy National Leader)	—	—
8	Wang Jun 王君	1952	—	Han	Director, State Administration of Work Safety (2008); Governor of Shanxi (2009–2012)	PM	—	—
9	Wang Min 王珉	1950	—	Han	Secretary, Jilin Provincial Committee (2007–2009); Secretary, Liaoning Provincial Committee (2009–2012)	PM	—	—
10	Wang Chen 王晨	1950	—	Han	President, People's Daily (2007–2008); Chairman, State Internet Information Office (2011–2012); Deputy Head, Publicity Department (2008–2012); Director, Information Office of the State Council (2008–2011)	PM	—	—
11	Wang Yi 王毅	1953	—	Han	Director, Taiwan Affairs Office	PM		—
12	Wang Wanbin 王万宾	1949	—	Han	Deputy Secretary-General, Standing Committee of the National People's Congress	—	—	—
13	Wang Taihua 王太华	1945	—	Han	Director, State Administration of Radio, Film and Television	PM	—	—
14	Wang Zhengwei 王正伟	1957	—	Hui	Chairman, Ningxia Hui Autonomous People's Government	PM		—
15	Wang Dongming 王东明	1956	—	Han	Director, Office of the Central Institutional Organization Commission	PM	—	—
16	Wang Lequan 王乐泉	1944	—	Han	Secretary, Xinjiang Uyghur Autonomous Regional Committee (2007–2010); Deputy Secretary, Central Political and Legal Affairs Commission (2010–2012)	PM	—	PB
17	Wang Zhaoguo 王兆国	1941	—	Han	Vice Chairman, Standing Committee of the National People's Congress; Chairman, All-China Federation of Trade Unions	DNL		PB
18	Wang Xudong 王旭东	1946	—	Han	Minister of Industry and Information Technology (2007–2008); Chairman, State Electricity Regulatory Commission (2008–2011); Vice Minister of Industry and Information Technology (2008–2011); Vice Chairman, Committee for Social and Legal Affairs of the Chinese People's Political Consultative Conference (2011–2012)	PM	—	—
19	Wang Qishan 王岐山	1946	—	Han	Vice Premier, State Council	DNL		PB
20	Wang Huning 王沪宁	1955	—	Han	Director, Central Policy Research Office	DNL		ST
21	Wang Xuejun 王学军	1952	↑	Han	Director, State Bureau for Letters and Calls of the State Council; Deputy Secretary-General, State Council	DPM	—	—
22	Wang Guosheng 王国生	1947	§	Han	Commander, Lanzhou Military Region	Lt. Gen. (Note: Lieutenant General)	—	—
23	Wang Jinshan 王金山	1945	—	Han	Secretary, Anhui Provincial Committee	PM	—	—
24	Wang Shengjun 王胜俊	1946	—	Han	President, Supreme Court	DNL	—	—
25	Wang Xinxian 王新宪	1954	↑	Han	Vice Chairman, Central Committee of the China Disabled Persons' Federation; Director-General, Executive Council of the China Disabled Persons' Federation	PM	—	—
26	Wang Jiarui 王家瑞	1949	—	Han	Head, International Liaison Department	PM		—
27	Wang Jianping 王建平	1953	§↑	Han	Chief of Staff, Chinese People's Armed Police Force (2007–2008); Deputy Commander, Chinese People's Armed Police Force (2008–2009); Commander, Chinese People's Armed Police (2009–2012)	Lt. Gen.	—	—
28	Wang Hongju 王鸿举	1945	∞	Han	Mayor of Chongqing (2007–2009); Vice Chair, Environmental and Resources Protection Committee of the National People's Congress (2009–2012)	PM	—	—
29	Wang Xibin 王喜斌	1948	§	Han	President, National Defense University	Lt. Gen.	—	—
30	Uyunqimg 乌云其木格	1942	♀	Mongol	Vice Chairwoman, Standing Committee of the National People's Congress	DNL	—	—
31	Yin Weimin 尹蔚民	1953	—	Han	Minister of Human Resources and Social Security; Party Secretary, Ministry of Human Resources and Social Security; Director, State Administration of Civil Service of the State Council	PM	—	—
32	Deng Nan (Note: Deng Nan is the daughter of Deng Xiaoping.) 邓楠	1945	♀∞	Han	First Secretary, Central Committee of the China Association for Science and Technology; Vice Chairman, Central Committee of the China Association for Science and Technology	PM	—	—
33	Deng Changyou 邓昌友	1947	§	Han	Political Commissar, People's Liberation Army Air Force	Gen.	—	—
34	Ashat Kerimbay 艾斯海提·克里木拜	1947	—	Kazakh	Chairman, Xinjiang Committee of the Chinese People's Political Consultative Conference	PM	—	—
35	Shi Zongyuan 石宗源	1946	∞	Hui	Secretary, Guizhou Provincial Committee (2007–2010)	PM	—	—
36	Lu Zhangong 卢展工	1952	—	Han	Secretary, Fujian Provincial Committee (2007–2009); Secretary, Henan Provincial Committee (2009–2012)	PM	—	—
37	Tian Chengping 田成平	1945	—	Han	Minister of Labor and Social Security (2007–2008); Vice Chairman, All-China Working Committee for Old Age (2007–2008); Deputy Head, Central Leading Group for Rural Work (2008–2012)	PM	—	—
38	Tian Xiusi 田修思	1950	§	Han	Political Commissar, Lanzhou Military Region (2007–2009); Political Commissar, Chengdu Military Region (2009–2012)	Lt. Gen.	—	—
39	Bai Lichen 白立忱	1941	—	Hui	Vice Chairman, National Committee of the Chinese People's Political Consultative Conference	DNL	—	—
40	Bai Zhijian 白志健	1948	—	Han	Head, Liaison Office of the Central People's Government in the Macau Special Administrative Region	PM	—	—
41	Bai Enpei 白恩培	1946	—	Han	Secretary, Yunnan Provincial Committee; Chairman, Yunnan People's Congress	PM	—	—
42	Bai Jingfu 白景富	1945	∞	Han	Vice Minister of Public Security (2007–2008); Executive Vice Minister of Public Security (2007–2008); Vice Chairman, Internal and Judicial Affairs Committee of the National People's Congress (2009–2012)	PM	—	—
43	Ling Jihua 令计划	1956	—	Han	Director, General Office; Deputy Director, Organization Department	DNL	—	ST
44	Ismail Tiliwaldi 司马义·铁力瓦尔地	1944	—	Uyghur	Vice Chairman, Standing Committee of the National People's Congress	DNL	—	—
45	Ji Bingxuan 吉炳轩	1951	—	Han	Director, Office for Ethical and Cultural Construction (2007–2008); Secretary, Heilongjiang Provincial Committee (2008–2012); Chairman, Heilongjiang People's Congress (2008–2012)	PM	—	—
46	Legqog 列确	1944	—	Tibetan	Chairman, Tibet Autonomous Regional People's Congress	PM	—	—
47	Lü Zushan 吕祖善	1946	∞	Han	Governor of Zhejiang (2007–2011); Vice Chairman, Financial and Economic Affairs Committee of the National People's Congress (2011–2012)	PM	—	—
48	Hui Liangyu 回良玉	1944	—	Han	Vice Premier, State Council	DNL		PB
49	Zhu Zhixin 朱之鑫	1949	—	Han	Deputy Director, National Development and Reform Commission	PM	—	—
50	Zhu Weiqun 朱维群	1947	—	Han	Executive Deputy Head, United Front Work Department	PM	—	—
51	Hua Jianmin 华建敏	1940	—	Han	Vice Chairman, Standing Committee of the National People's Congress; President, Red Cross Society of China	DNL	—	—
52	Qiangba Puncog 向巴平措	1947	—	Tibetan	Chairman, Tibet Autonomous People's Government; Chairman, Tibet Autonomous People's Congress	PM		—
53	Liu Jing 刘京	1944	—	Han	Vice Minister of Public Security; Director, 610 Office	PM	—	—
54	Liu Qi 刘淇	1942	—	Han	Secretary, Beijing Municipal Committee; President, Beijing Organizing Committee for the Olympic Games	DNL	—	PB
55	Liu Peng 刘鹏	1951	—	Han	Director, State General Administration of Sports	PM	—	—
56	Liu Yuan 刘源	1951	§	Han	People's Commissar, People's Liberation Army General Logistics Department	Gen.	—	—
57	Liu Yunshan 刘云山	1947	—	Han	Head, Publicity Department	DNL		PB, ST
58	Liu Dongdong 刘冬冬	1945	§	Han	Political Commissar, Jinan Military Region	Gen.	—	—
59	Liu Yongzhi 刘永治	1944	§∞	Han	Deputy Head, People's Liberation Army General Political Department; Vice Chairman, Education, Science, Culture and Public Health Committee of the National People's Congress	Gen.	—	—
60	Liu Chengjun 刘成军	1949	§	Han	President, PLA Academy of Military Science	Gen.	—	—
61	Liu Yandong 刘延东	1945	♀	Han	State Councilor; Vice President, Beijing Organizing Committee for the Olympic Games	DNL		PB, SC
62	Liu Zhijun 刘志军	1953	♮	Han	Minister of Railways	PM	—	—
63	Liu Qibao 刘奇葆	1953	—	Han	Secretary, Sichuan Provincial Committee	PM	—	—
64	Liu Mingkang 刘明康	1946	—	Han	Chairman, China Banking Regulatory Commission	PM		—
65	Liu Xiaojiang 刘晓江	1949	§	Han	Political Commissar, People's Liberation Army Navy	Adm. (Note: Admiral)	—	—
66	Liu Jiayi 刘家义	1955	—	Han	Auditor-General, National Audit Office	—	—	—
67	Xu Qiliang 许其亮	1950	§	Han	Commander, People's Liberation Army Air Force	Gen.	—	CMC
68	Sun Dafa 孙大发	1945	§	Han	Head, People's Liberation Army General Logistics Department	Gen.	—	—
69	Sun Zhongtong 孙忠同	1944	§	Han	Deputy Head, People's Liberation Army General Political Department; Deputy Secretary, Central Commission for Discipline Inspection	Gen.	—	SC–CCDI, (Note: Standing Committee of the Central Commission for Discipline Inspection) CCDI
70	Sun Chunlan 孙春兰	1950	♀	Han	Secretary, Fujian Provincial Committee; Chairman, Fujian People's Congress	PM	—	—
71	Sun Zhengcai 孙政才	1963	—	Han	Secretary, Jilin Provincial Committee; Chairman, Jilin People's Congress	PM	—	—
72	Sun Xiaoqun 孙晓群	1944	—	Han	Executive Deputy Chair, Working Committee of Organs Directly Under the Central Committee	PM	—	—
73	Su Rong 苏荣	1948	—	Han	Secretary, Jianxi Provincial Committee; Chairman, Jianxi People's Congress	PM	—	—
74	Du Qinglin 杜青林	1946	—	Han	Head of the United Front Work Department; Vice Chairman of Chinese People's Political Consultative Conference	DNL	—	—
75	Li Bin 李斌	1954	♀	Han	Chair, National Population and Family Planning Commission	PM	—	—
76	Li Changcai 李長才	1949	§	Han	Political Commissar, Lanzhou Military Region	Gen.	—	—
77	Li Changjiang 李长江	1944	—	Han	Director, State Administration of Quality Supervision, Inspection and Quarantine	PM	—	—
78	Li Changchun 李长春	1944	—	Han	Chairman, Central Commission for Guiding Cultural and Ethical Progress	NL		PSC, PB
79	Li Congjun 李从军	1949	—	Han	President, Xinhua News Agency	PM	—	—
80	Li Shiming 李世明	1948	—	Han	Commander, Chengdu Military Region	Gen.	—	—
81	Li Chengyu 李成玉	1946	—	Hui	President, Central Committee of the All-China Federation of Supply and Marketing Cooperatives; Governor of Henan	PM	—	—
82	Li Zhaozhuo 李兆焯	1944	—	Zhuang	Vice Chairman, National Committee of the Chinese People's Political Consultative Conference	DNL	—	—
83	Li Keqiang 李克强	1955	—	Han	Executive Vice Premier, State Council	NL		PSC, PB
84	Li Xueju 李学举	1945	—	Han	Minister of Civil Affairs	PM	—	—
85	Li Xueyong 李学勇	1950	—	Han	Party Secretary, Ministry of Science and Technology; Governor of Jiangsu (2010–2012)	PM		—
86	Li Jianguo 李建国	1946	—	Han	Vice Chairman, Standing Committee of the National People's Congress; Secretary-General, Standing Committee of the National People's Congress	DNL	—	—
87	Li Rongrong 李荣融	1944	—	Han	Vice Chair, Economics Committee of the Chinese People's Political Consultative Conference; Party Secretary, State-Owned Assets Supervision and Administration Commission	PM	—	—
88	Li Haifeng 李海峰	1949	♀	Han	Director, Overseas Chinese Affairs Office	PM	—	—
89	Li Jinai 李继耐	1942	§	Han	Head, People's Liberation Army General Political Department	Gen.	—	CMC
90	Li Shenglin 李盛霖	1946	—	Han	Minister of Transport	PM	—	—
91	Li Jingtian 李景田	1948	—	Manchu	Executive Vice President, Central Party School	PM		—
92	Li Yuanchao 李源潮	1950	—	Han	Head, Organization Department	DNL		PB, ST
93	Li Yizhong 李毅中	1945	—	Han	Minister of Industry and Information Technology	PM	—	—
94	Yang Jing 杨晶	1953	—	Mongol	Chairman, State Ethics Affairs Commission	PM		—
95	Yang Yuanyuan 杨元元	1950	—	Han	Director, Civil Aviation Administration of China; Deputy Director, State Administration of Work Safety	PM	—	—
96	Yang Chuantang 杨传堂	1954	—	Han	Vice Chairman, State Ethnic Affairs Commission	PM	—	—
97	Yang Yanyin (Note: Yang Yanyin was promoted to provincial-ministerial ranks in 2004 as Executive Deputy Chair of the Working Committee of State Organs Directly under the Central Committee) 杨衍银	1947	♀	Han	Executive Deputy Chair, Working Committee of the Organs Directly under the Central Committee	PM	—	—
98	Yang Jiechi 杨洁篪	1950	—	Han	Minister of Foreign Affairs	PM		—
99	Yang Chonghui (Note: Yang Chonghui became Chair of the People's Political Consultative Conference of Yunnan province in 2003, making him a full-rank provincial-ministerial official) 杨崇汇	1945	—	Han	Deputy Secretary-General, National Committee of the Chinese People's Political Consultative Conference	PM	—	—
100	Xiao Jie 肖捷	1957	—	Han	Director, State Administration of Taxation	PM	—	—
101	Wu Shuangzhan 吳雙戰	1945	§	Han	Commander, People's Armed Police; Deputy Chairman, Internal and Judicial Affairs Committee of the National People's Congress	Gen.	—	—
102	Wu Bangguo 吴邦国	1941	—	Han	Chairman, Standing Committee of the National People's Congress	NL		PSC, PB
103	Wu Shengli 吴胜利	1945	§	Han	Commander, People's Liberation Army Navy	Adm.		CMC
104	Wu Aiying 吴爱英	1951	—	Han	Minister of Justice	PM	—	—
105	Wu Xinxiong 吴新雄	1949	—	Han	Governor of Jiangxi; Chairman, State Electricity Regulatory Commission	PM	—	—
106	He Yong 何勇	1940	—	Han	Deputy Secretary, Central Commission for Discipline Inspection	DNL	—	ST, SC–CCDI, CCDI
107	Wang Yang 汪洋	1955	—	Han	Secretary, Guangdong Provincial Committee	DNL		PB
108	Shen Yueyue 沈跃跃	1957	♀	Han	Executive Deputy Head, Organization Department	PM	—	—
109	Song Xiuyan 宋秀岩	1955	♀	Han	Vice President, Central Committee of the All-China Women's Federation; First-ranked Secretary, Central Committee of the All-China Women's Federation	PM	—	—
110	Chi Wanchun 迟万春	1946	§	Han	Deputy Head, People's Liberation Army General Armaments Department	Gen.	—	—
111	Zhang Ping 张平	1946	—	Han	Chairman, National Development and Reform Commission	PM	—	—
112	Zhang Yang 张阳	1951	§	Han	Political Commissar, Guangzhou Military Region	Gen.	—	—
113	Zhang Youxia 张又侠	1950	§	Han	Commander, Shenyang Military Region	Gen.	—	—
114	Zhang Yunchuan 张云川	1946	—	Han	Secretary, Hebei Provincial Committee; Chairman, Hebei People's Congress	PM	—	—
115	Zhang Wenyue 张文岳	1944	∞	Han	Secretary, Liaoning Provincial Committee (2007–2010); Vice Chair, Environment Protection and Resources Conservation Committee of the National People's Congress (2010–2012)	PM	—	—
116	Zhang Yutai 张玉台	1945	∞	Han	Director, Development Research Center (2007–2011)	PM	—	—
117	Zhang Zuoji (Note: Zhang Zuoji earned his Central Committee membership by virtue of his position as Governor of Liaoning but he resigned in December 2007 before reaching mandatory retirement age (65); he then served on a nominal advisory role for the remainder of his career in the CPPCC) 张左己	1945	∞	Han	Governor of Heilongjiang (2007); Chairman, Economics Committee of the Chinese People's Political Consultative Conference	PM	—	—
118	Zhang Qingwei 张庆伟	1961	—	Han	Director, State Administration for Science, Technology and Industry for National Defence; President, Commercial Aircraft Corporation of China, Ltd. Vice Governor of Hebei; Deputy Secretary, Hebei Provincial Committee	SPM (Note: Sub-provincial (vice-ministerial))	—	—
119	Zhang Qingli 张庆黎	1951	—	Han	Secretary, Tibet Autonomous Regional Committee	PM	—	—
120	Zhang Baoshun 张宝顺	1950	—	Han	Secretary, Shaanxi Provincial Committee; Secretary, Anhui Provincial Committee	PM	—	—
121	Zhang Chunxian 张春贤	1953	—	Han	Secretary, Hunan Provincial Committee; Chairman, Hunan People's Congress; Secretary, Xinjiang Uyghur Autonomous Regional Committee	PM	—	—
122	Zhang Gaoli 张高丽	1946	—	Han	Secretary, Tianjin Municipal Committee	DNL		PB
123	Zhang Haiyang 张海阳	1949	§	Han	Political Commissar, Chengdu Military Region; Political Commissar, Second Artillery Corps	Gen.	—	—
124	Zhang Dejiang 张德江	1946	—	Han	Director, Safety Production Committee; Vice Premier, State Council	DNL		PB, SC
125	Lu Bing 陆兵	1944	—	Zhuang	Deputy Chairman, Ethics Affairs Committee of the National People's Congress	—	—	—
126	Lu Hao 陆浩	1947	—	Han	Secretary, Gansu Provincial Committee	PM	—	—
127	Abdul'ahat Abdulrixit 阿不来提·阿不都热西提	1942	—	Uyghur	Vice Chairman, National Committee of the Chinese People's Political Consultative Conference	DNL	—	—
128	Chen Lei 陈雷	1954	—	Han	Minister of Water Resources	PM	—	—
129	Chen Zhili 陈至立	1942	♀	Han	President, Central Committee of the All-China Women's Federation; Vice Chairwoman, Standing Committee of the National People's Congress	DNL		—
130	Chen Guoling 陈国令	1947	§	Han	Political Commissar, Nanjing Military Region	Gen.	—	—
131	Chen Jianguo 陈建国	1945	—	Han	Secretary, Ningxia Hui Autonomous Regional Committee; Vice Chairman, Internal and Judicial Affairs Committee of the National People's Congress	PM	—	—
132	Chen Kuiyuan 陈奎元	1941	—	Han	President, Chinese Academy of Social Sciences	PM	—	—
133	Chen Bingde 陈炳德	1941	§	Han	Chief, People's Liberation Army General Staff Department	Gen.		CMC
134	Fan Changlong 范长龙	1947	§	Han	Commander, Jinan Military Region	Gen.	—	—
135	Lin Shusen 林树森	1946	—	Han	Governor of Guizhou; Vice Chairman, Subcommittee for Hong Kong, Macao, Taiwan and Overseas Chinese Committee of the Chinese People's Political Consultative Conference	PM	—	—
136	Shang Fulin 尚福林	1951	—	Han	Chairman, China Securities Regulatory Commission; Vice Chairman, Executive Committee of the International Securities Regulatory Commission	PM	—	—
137	Luo Baoming 罗保铭	1952	—	Han	Governor of Hainan	PM	—	—
138	Luo Qingquan 罗清泉	1945–2021	—	Han	Chairman, Hubei People's Congress; Vice Chairman, Environmental and Resources Protection Committee of the National People's Congress	PM	—	—
139	Zhou Ji 周济	1946	—	Han	Minister of Education; President, Chinese Academy of Engineering	PM	—	—
140	Zhou Qiang 周强	1960	—	Han	Governor of Hunan	PM		—
141	Zhou Xiaochuan 周小川	1948	—	Han	Governor, People's Bank of China	PM		—
142	Zhou Shengxian 周生贤	1949	—	Han	Minister of Environmental Protection	PM		—
143	Zhou Yongkang 周永康	1942	—	Han	Chairman, Central Public Security Comprehensive Management Commission; Secretary, Central Political and Legal Affairs Commission	NL		PSC, PB
144	Zhou Bohua 周伯华	1948	—	Han	Director, State Administration of Industry and Commerce	PM	—	—
145	Fang Fenghui 房峰辉	1951	§	Han	Commander, Beijing Military Region	Gen.		—
146	Meng Xuenong (Note: Meng's tenure in active politics came to an abrupt end in 2008 after the mudslide scandal in Shanxi province, where he was serving as governor. He was transferred to insignificant positions after that but maintained his rank.) 孟学农	1949	—	Han	Governor of Shanxi (2007–2008); Deputy Secretary, Work Committee for Central Government Organs (2008–2012)	PM	—	—
147	Meng Jianzhu 孟建柱	1947	—	Han	Minister of Public Security	DNL		—
148	Zhao Leji 赵乐际	1957	—	Han	Secretary, Shaanxi Provincial Committee	PM	—	—
149	Zhao Keshi 赵克石	1947	§	Han	Commander, Nanjing Military Region	Gen.	—	—
150	Zhao Hongzhu 赵洪祝	1947	—	Han	Secretary, Zhejiang Provincial Committee	PM	—	—
151	Hu Chunhua 胡春华	1963	—	Han	First Secretary, Central Committee of the Communist Youth League; Governor of Hebei; Secretary, Inner Mongolian Autonomous Regional Committee	PM	—	—
152	Hu Jintao 胡锦涛	1942	—	Han	General Secretary, Central Committee; Chairman, Central Military Commission; President of China	NL		PSC, PB, CMC
153	Liu Binjie 柳斌杰	1948	—	Han	Director, General Administration of Press and Publication; Director, National Copyright Administration	PM	—	—
154	Yu Zhengsheng 俞正声	1945	—	Han	Secretary, Shanghai Municipal Committee	DNL		PB
155	Jiang Daming 姜大明	1953	—	Han	Governor of Shandong	PM	—	—
156	Jiang Weixin 姜伟新	1949	—	Han	Minister of Housing and Urban-Rural Development	PM	—	—
157	Jiang Yikang 姜异康	1953	—	Han	Secretary, Shandong Provincial Committee; Chairman, Shandong People's Congress	PM	—	—
158	He Guoqiang 贺国强	1943	—	Han	Secretary, Central Commission for Discipline Inspection	NL		PSC, PB
159	Qin Guangrong 秦光荣	1954	—	Han	Governor of Yunnan; Secretary, Yunnan Provincial Committee	PM	—	—
160	Yuan Chunqing 袁纯清	1952	—	Han	Governor of Shaanxi; Secretary, Shaanxi Provincial Committee	PM	—	—
161	Geng Huichang 耿惠昌	1951	—	Han	Minister of State Security	PM	—	—
162	Nie Weiguo 聂卫国	1952	—	Han	Chairman, Board of Directors of the Xinjiang Production and Construction Corps	PM	—	—
163	Jia Qinglin 贾庆林	1940	—	Han	Chairman, National Committee of the Chinese People's Political Consultative Conference	NL		PSC, PB
164	Jia Zhibang 贾治邦	1946	—	Han	Director, State Forestry Administration	PM	—	—
165	Qian Yunlu 钱运录	1944	—	Han	Secretary-General, National Committee of the Chinese People's Political Consultative Conference; Vice Chairman, National Committee of the Chinese People's Political Consultative Conference	DNL	—	—
166	Xu Caihou 徐才厚	1943	§	Han	Vice Chairman, Central Military Commission	Gen.		PB, CMC
167	Xu Guangchun 徐光春	1944	—	Han	Secretary, Henan Provincial Committee	PM	—	—
168	Xu Shousheng 徐守盛	1953	—	Han	Governor of Henan; Deputy Secretary, Henan Provincial Committee	PM	—	—
169	Xu Shaoshi 徐绍史	1951	—	Han	Minister of Land and Resources	PM	—	—
170	Gao Qiang 高强	1944	—	Han	Minister of Health	PM	—	—
171	Guo Boxiong 郭伯雄	1942	§	Han	Vice Chairman, Central Military Commission	Gen.		PB, CMC
172	Guo Jinlong 郭金龙	1947	—	Han	Mayor of Beijing	PM	—	—
173	Guo Gengmao 郭庚茂	1950	—	Han	Governor of Henan (2008–2012); Governor of Hebei	PM	—	—
174	Huang Xiaojing 黄小晶	1946	—	Han	Governor of Fujian	PM		—
175	Huang Huahua 黄华华	1946	—	Han	Governor of Guangdong	PM	—	—
176	Huang Qingyi 黄晴宜	1944	♀	Han	Vice Chairman, All-China Women's Federation	—	—	—
177	Huang Xianzhong 黄献中	1947	§	Han	Political Commissar, Shenyang Military Region	Gen.	—	—
178	Cao Jianming 曹建明	1955	—	Han	Procurator-General, Supreme People's Procuratorate	DNL	—	—
179	Sheng Guangzu 盛光祖	1949	—	Han	Minister of Railways; Minister, General Administration of Customs	PM		—
180	Chang Wanquan 常万全	1949	§	Han	Head, People's Liberation Army General Armaments Department	Gen.		CMC
181	Fu Tinggui 符廷贵	1944	§	Han	Political Commissar, Beijing Military Region	Gen.	—	—
182	Kang Rixin 康日新	1953	♮	Han	Chairman, China National Nuclear Corporation	—	—	—
183	Zhang Qinsheng 章沁生	1948	§	Han	Deputy Head, People's Liberation Army General Staff Department	Gen.	—	—
184	Yan Rongzhu 焉荣竹	1952	↑	Han	Secretary, Jinan Municipal Committee	DPM	—	—
185	Liang Guanglie 梁光烈	1940	§	Han	Minister of National Defense (2008–2012); Deputy Head, People's Liberation Army General Staff Department (2007–2008)	DNL		CMC
186	Liang Baohua 梁保华	1945	—	Han	Secretary, Jiangsu Provincial Committee (2007–2010); Governor of Jiangsu (2007–2008)	PM	—	—
187	Peng Xiaofeng 彭小枫	1945	§	Han	Political Commissar, Second Artillery Corps	Gen.	—	—
188	Peng Qinghua 彭清华	1957	—	Han	Chairman, Liaison Office of the Central People's Government in the Hong Kong Special Administrative Region	PM	—	—
189	Ge Zhenfeng 葛振峰	1944	§	Han	Deputy Head, People's Liberation Army General Staff Department	Gen.	—	—
190	Dong Guishan 董贵山	1946	§	Han	Commander, Tibet Military District	Lt. Gen.	—	—
191	Jiang Jufeng 蒋巨峰	1948	—	Han	Governor of Sichuan	PM	—	—
192	Han Zheng 韩正	1954	—	Han	Secretary, Shanghai Municipal Committee	PM	—	—
193	Han Changfu 韩长赋	1954	—	Han	Minister of Agriculture (2009–2012); Governor of Jilin (2007–2009)	PM		—
194	Yu Linxiang 喻林祥	1945	§	Han	Political Commissar, People's Armed Police	Gen.	—	—
195	Chu Bo 储波	1944	—	Han	Secretary, Inner Mongolia Autonomous Regional Committee	PM	—	—
196	Tong Shiping 童世平	1947	§	Han	Chairman, Commission for Discipline Inspection of the Central Military Commission (2009–2012); Deputy Head, People's Liberation Army General Staff Department (2009–2012); Political Commissar, PLA National Defence University (2007–2009)	Gen.	—	—
197	Wen Jiabao 温家宝	1942	—	Han	Premier, State Council; Chairman, State Commission for Public Sector Reform; Chairman, National Defense Mobilization Commission; Chairman, National Energy Commission; Chairman, Central Institutional Organization Commission	NL		PSC, PB
198	Xie Xuren 谢旭人	1947	—	Han	Minister of Finance	PM	—	—
199	Qiang Wei 强卫	1953	—	Han	Secretary, Qinghai Provincial Committee	PM	—	—
200	Lu Yongxiang 路甬祥	1942	—	Han	President, Chinese Academy of Sciences	PM	—	—
201	Jing Zhiyuan 靖志远	1944	§	Han	Commander, Second Artillery Corps	Gen.	—	CMC
202	Cai Wu 蔡武	1949	—	Han	Minister of Culture	PM		—
203	Liao Hui 廖暉	1942	—	Han	Director, Hong Kong and Macau Affairs Office	PM	—	—
204	Liao Xilong 廖錫龍	1940	§	Han	Head, People's Liberation Army General Logistics Department	Gen.	—	CMC
205	Bo Xilai 薄熙來	1949	♮	Han	Secretary, Chongqing Municipal Committee	DNL		PB
206	Dai Bingguo 戴秉国	1944	—	Tujia	Secretary-General, Foreign Affairs Leading Small Group; Secretary-General, Central Leading Group for Taiwan Affairs	DNL		—
207	Dai Xianglong 戴相龙	1944	—	Han	Governor, People's Bank of China	PM		—
208	Wei Liqun 魏礼群	1944	—	Han	Executive Vice President, Chinese Academy of Governance	PM	—	—

=== Alternates ===
Notes:

- The individuals below are listed according to the number of votes in favour received at the Party Congress that elected the committee; if the number of votes in favour they received were the same, they are ordered by the number of strokes in their surnames.

Listing	Name Hanzi	Year of Birth	Keys	Ethnicity	Office	Rank
1	Wang Xinxian 王新宪	1954	↑	Han	—	—
2	Yan Rongzhu 焉荣竹	1952	↑	Han	—	—
3	Wang Xuejun 王学军	1952	↑	Han	—	—
4	Wang Jianping 王建平	1953	§↑	Han	—	—
5	Liu Shiquan 刘石泉	1963	—	Han	—	—
6	Du Yuxin 杜宇新	1953	—	Han	—	—
7	Fu Yuelan 符跃兰	1953	♀	Han	—	—
8	Ma Biao 马飚	1954	—	Zhuang	—	—
9	Wang Guangya 王光亚	1950	—	Han	—	—
10	Danko 旦科	1962	—	Tibetan	—	—
11	Zhu Xiaodan 朱小丹	1953	—	Han	—	—
12	Quan Zhezhu 全哲洙	1952	—	Korean	—	—
13	Li Yumei 李玉妹	1956	♀	Han	—	—
14	Zhang Lianzhen 张连珍	1951	♀	Han	—	—
15	Lin Zuoming 林左鸣	1957	—	Han	—	—
16	Luo Zhengfu 罗正富	1952	—	Yi	—	—
17	Luo Zhijun 罗志军	1951	—	Han	—	—
18	Zheng Lizhong 郑立中	1951	—	Han	—	—
19	Zhao Xiangeng 赵宪庚	1953	—	Han	—	—
20	Yuan Rongxiang 袁荣祥	1955	—	Han	—	—
21	Huang Jianguo 黄建国	1952	—	Han	—	—
22	Shen Weichen 申维辰	1956	—	Han	—	—
23	Ren Yaping 任亚平	1952	—	Han	—	—
24	Liu Hui 刘慧	1959	♀	Hui	—	—
25	Liu Zhenqi 刘振起	1946	§	Han	—	—
26	Sun Jianguo 孙建国	1952	§	Han	—	—
27	Li Xi 李希	1956	—	Han	—	—
28	Li Maifu 李买富	1946	§	Han	—	—
29	Yang Gang 杨刚	1953	—	Han	—	—
30	Yang Song 杨松	1950	—	Han	—	—
31	Yu Yuanhui 余远辉	1964	—	Yao	—	—
32	Yu Xinrong 余欣荣	1959	—	Han	—	—
33	Zhang Chengyin 张成寅	1950	—	Han	—	—
34	Zhang Guoqing 张国清	1964	—	Han	—	—
35	Zhang Yijiong 张裔炯	1955	—	Han	—	—
36	Chen Cungen 陈存根	1952	—	Han	—	—
37	Chen Min'er 陈敏尔	1960	—	Han	—	—
38	Nur Bekri 努尔·白克力	1960	—	Uyghur	—	—
39	Lin Jun 林军	1949	—	Han	—	—
40	Luo Huining 骆惠宁	1954	—	Han	—	—
41	Huang Kangsheng 黄康生	1952	—	Buyi	—	—
42	Wei Fenghe 魏凤和	1954	§	Han	—	—
43	Yu Gesheng 于革胜	1956	—	Han	—	—
44	Wang Weiguang 王伟光	1950	—	Han	—	—
45	Ai Husheng 艾虎生	1951	§	Han	—	—
46	Zhu Fazhong 朱发忠	1948	—	Han	—	—
47	Liu Xuepu 刘学普	1957	—	Tujia	—	—
48	Liu Zhenlai 刘振来	1949	—	Hui	—	—
49	Sun Jinlong 孙金龙	1962	—	Han	—	—
50	Su Shiliang 苏士亮	1950	§	Han	—	—
51	Li Changyin 李长印	1951	—	Han	—	—
52	Yue Fuhong 岳福洪	1949	—	Han	—	—
53	Jin Zhenji 金振吉	1959	—	Korean	—	—
54	Qin Yinhe 秦银河	1951	§	Han	—	—
55	Xu Yitian 徐一天	1947	—	Han	—	—
56	Xue Yanzhong 薛延忠	1954	—	Han	—	—
57	Wang Xiankui 王宪魁	1952	—	Han	—	—
58	Bayanqolu 巴音朝鲁	1955	—	Mongolian	—	—
59	Ye Dongsong 叶冬松	1958	—	Han	—	—
60	Shi Lianxi 史莲喜	1952	♀	Han	—	—
61	Liu Xiaokai 刘晓凯	1962	—	Miao	—	—
62	Wu Dingfu 吴定富	1946	—	Han	—	—
63	Zhang Geng 张耕	1944	—	Han	—	—
64	Zhang Jiyao 张基尧	1945	—	Han	—	—
65	Chen Baosheng 陈宝生	1956	—	Han	—	—
66	Miao Wei 苗圩	1955	—	Han	—	—
67	Lin Mingyue 林明月	1947	♀	Han	—	—
68	Zhao Aiming 赵爱明	1961	♀	Han	—	—
69	Hu Zejun 胡泽君	1955	♀	Han	—	—
70	Hu Zhenmin 胡振民	1946	—	Han	—	—
71	Xian Hui 咸辉	1958	♀	Han	—	—
72	Yuan Jiajun 袁家军	1962	—	Han	—	—
73	Xi Zhongchao 息中朝	1947	—	Han	—	—
74	Xu Lejiang 徐乐江	1959	—	Han	—	—
75	Xu Fenlin 徐粉林	1953	§	Han	—	—
76	Huang Xingguo 黄兴国	1954	—	Han	—	—
77	Chen Yiqin 谌贻琴	1959	—	Bai	—	—
78	Wang Yupu 王玉普	1956	—	Han	—	—
79	Wang Guosheng 王国生	1956	—	Han	—	—
80	You Quan 尤权	1954	—	Han	—	—
81	Li Jincheng 李金城	1963	—	Han	—	—
82	Xiao Gang 肖钢	1958	—	Han	—	—
83	Xiao Yaqing 肖亚庆	1959	—	Han	—	—
84	He Lifeng 何立峰	1955	—	Han	—	—
85	Zhang Shibo 张仕波	1952	§	Han	—	—
86	Zhang Xiaogang 张晓刚	1954	—	Han	—	—
87	Jin Zhuanglong 金壮龙	1964	—	Han	—	—
88	Hu Xiaolian 胡晓炼	1958	♀	Han	—	—
89	Bai Chunli 白春礼	1953	—	Manchu	—	—
90	Dorji 多吉	1953	—	Tibetan	—	—
91	Liu Wei 刘伟	1958	—	Han	—	—
92	Liu Weiping 刘伟平	1953	—	Han	—	—
93	Liu Yuejun 刘粤军	1954	§	Han	—	—
94	Jiang Zelin 江泽林	1959	—	Han	—	—
95	Li Ke 李克	1956	—	Zhuang	—	—
96	Li Andong 李安东	1946	§	Han	—	—
97	Leng Rong 冷溶	1953	—	Han	—	—
98	Chen Run'er 陈润儿	1957	—	Han	—	—
99	Lu Xinshe 鹿心社	1956	—	Han	—	—
100	Xie Heping 谢和平	1956	—	Han	—	—
101	Wang Rulin 王儒林	1953	—	Han	—	—
102	Shi Dahua 石大华	1951	—	Han	—	—
103	Ye Xiaowen 叶小文	1950	—	Han	—	—
104	Ji Lin 吉林	1962	—	Han	—	—
105	Su Shulin 苏树林	1962	—	Han	—	—
106	Li Kang 李康	1957	♀	Zhuang	—	—
107	Li Chongxi 李崇禧	1951	—	Han	—	—
108	Yang Liwei 杨利伟	1965	—	Han	—	—
109	Yang Huanning 杨焕宁	1957	—	Han	—	—
110	Zhang Xuan 张轩	1958	♀	Han	—	—
111	Chen Zhenggao 陈政高	1952	—	Han	—	—
112	Wu Jihai 武吉海	1953	—	Miao	—	—
113	Xiang Junbo 项俊波	1957	—	Han	—	—
114	Shu Xiaoqin 舒晓琴	1956	♀	Han	—	—
115	Zhan Wenlong 詹文龙	1955	—	Han	—	—
116	Pan Yunhe 潘云鹤	1946	—	Han	—	—
117	Dao Linyin 刀林荫	1959	♀	Dai	—	—
118	Wang Rong 王荣	1958	—	Han	—	—
119	Tang Tao 汤涛	1962	—	Han	—	—
120	Li Jiheng 李纪恒	1957	—	Han	—	—
121	Song Airong 宋爱荣	1959	♀	Han	—	—
122	Zhang Jie 张杰	1958	—	Han	—	—
123	Chen Zuoning 陈左宁	1957	♀	Han	—	—
124	Zhu Yanfeng 竺延风	1961	—	Han	—	—
125	Luo Lin 骆琳	1955	—	Han	—	—
126	Tie Ning 铁凝	1957	♀	Han	—	—
127	Chu Yimin 褚益民	1953	§	Han	—	—
128	Cai Yingting 蔡英挺	1954	§	Han	—	—
129	Xing Yuanmin 邢元敏	1948	♀	Han	—	—
130	Li Hongzhong 李鸿忠	1956	—	Han	—	—
131	Chen Chuanping 陈川平	1962	—	Han	—	—
132	Mei Kebao 梅克保	1957	—	Han	—	—
133	Cao Qing 曹清	1947	—	Han	—	—
134	Jiao Huancheng 焦焕成	1949	—	Han	—	—
135	Lei Chunmei 雷春美	1959	♀	She	—	—
136	Zhai Huqu 翟虎渠	1950	—	Han	—	—
137	Ding Yiping 丁一平	1951	§	Han	—	—
138	Min Weifang 闵维方	1950	—	Han	—	—
139	Guo Shuqing 郭树清	1956	—	Han	—	—
140	Wang Xia 王侠	1954	♀	Han	—	—
141	Chen Yuan 陈元	1945	—	Han	—	—
142	Chen Deming 陈德铭	1949	—	Han	—	—
143	Jiang Jianqing 姜建清	1953	—	Han	—	—
144	Guo Shengkun 郭声琨	1954	—	Han	—	—
145	Dong Wancai 董万才	1947	—	Han	—	—
146	Cai Zhenhua 蔡振华	1961	—	Han	—	—
147	Wang Mingfang 王明方	1952	—	Han	—	—
148	Shen Suli 沈素琍	1958	♀	Han	—	—
149	Zhang Daili 张岱梨	1954	♀	Han	—	—
150	Chen Quanguo 陈全国	1955	—	Han	—	—
151	Ulagan 乌兰	1958	♀	Mongolian	—	—
152	Fu Zhifang 付志方	1956	—	Han	—	—
153	Xia Baolong 夏宝龙	1952	—	Han	—	—
154	Wang Anshun 王安顺	1957	—	Han	—	—
155	Wu Xianguo 吴显国	1956	—	Han	—	—
156	Zhang Ruimin 张瑞敏	1949	—	Han	—	—
157	Zhao Yong 赵勇	1963	—	Han	—	—
158	Li Zhanshu 栗战书	1950	—	Han	—	—
159	Che Jun 车俊	1955	—	Han	—	—
160	Jiang Jiemin 蒋洁敏	1955	—	Han	—	—
161	Wang Xiaochu 王晓初	1958	—	Han	—	—
162	Liu Yupu 刘玉浦	1949	—	Han	—	—
163	Wang Sanyun 王三运	1952	—	Han	—	—
164	Yin Yicui 殷一璀	1955	♀	Han	—	—
165	Lou Jiwei 楼继伟	1950	—	Han	—	—
166	Liu Zhenya 刘振亚	1952	—	Han	—	—
167	Jia Ting'an 贾廷安	1952	§	Han	—	—
