= Liu Zhenlai =

Chinese politician

Liu Zhenlai (Chinese: 刘振来; born 1949) is a Chinese senior general. Born in Beijing to a Hui ethnical group, he joined the People's Liberation Army in February 1968 and the Chinese Communist Party in October 1968. In 2003, he became the political commissar of the Beijing Military Region Air Force. He was promoted to major general in 1995 and to lieutenant general in 2005. He was an alternate member of the 17th Central Committee of the Chinese Communist Party, a member of the 12th Standing Committee of the National People's Congress, and a member of the Ethnic Affairs Committee of the National People's Congress.
