= Liu Zhenya =

Former Chairman of State Grid Corporation

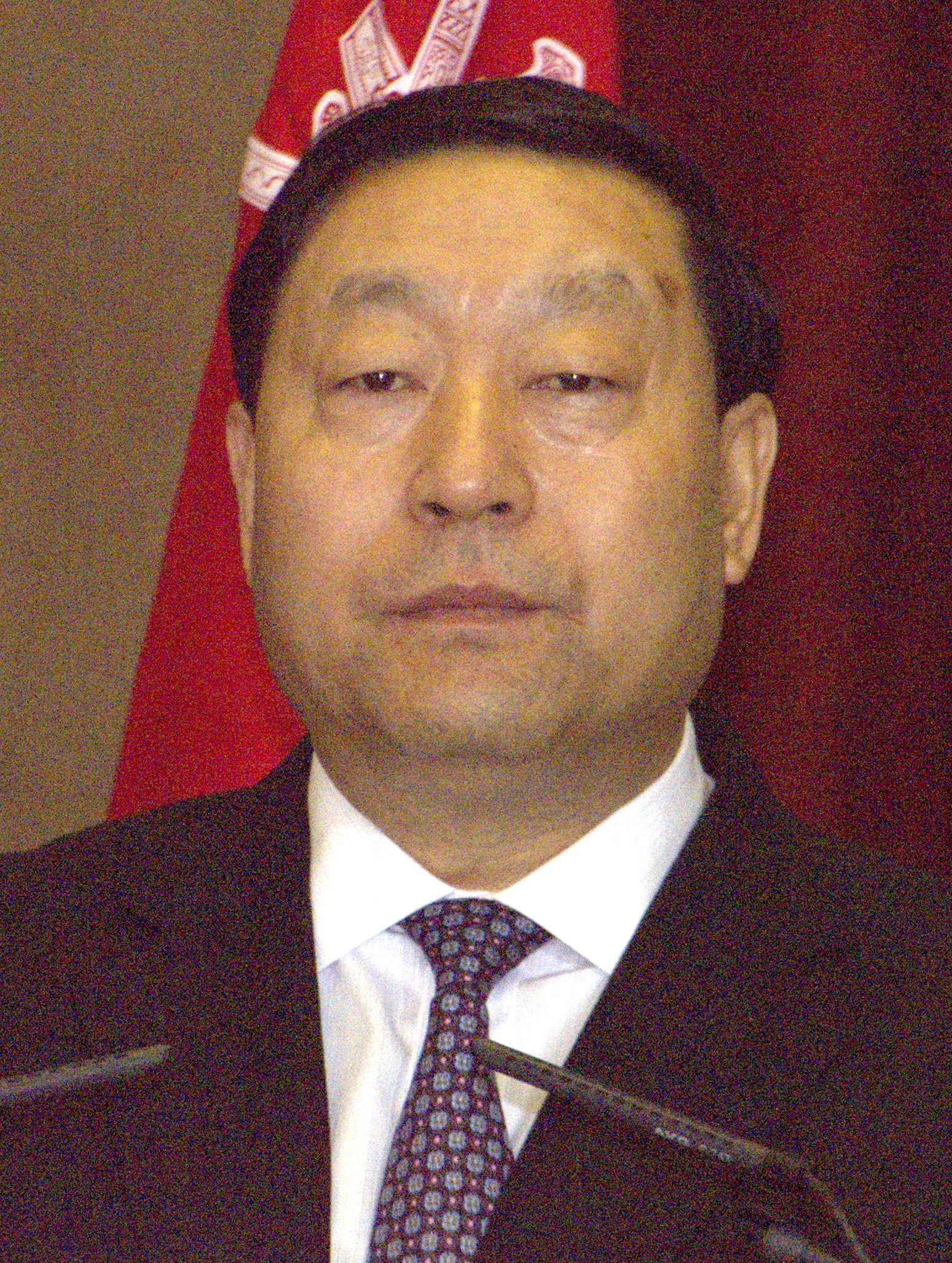
Liu Zhenya

Liu Zhenya (Chinese: 刘振亚; born 1952) is Chairman of Global Energy Interconnection Development and Cooperation Organization (GEIDCO) which proposes to build a global super grid of low-loss HVDC power lines for long distance energy exchange and trade.

== Biography ==
Liu Zhenya was born in 1952 in Shandong province. Liu began working in the electrical field at age 19 and worked in a local power plant during the Cultural Revolution.

He graduated from Shandong Institute of Technology with a degree in power systems and automation. He spent the next 20 years of his career working in power plants and in the Shandong branch of State Power Corporation of China. Liu led a subsidiary of Shandong Electric Power Company on a fundraising campaign to close the gap in electric service in Shandong, raising RMB 2 billion in 1996 and earning a reputation for his ambition and drive to succeed.

Liu was transferred to Beijing where he worked as a vice-general manager at State Power Corporation shortly before its dissolution. After its dissolution, he began working at State Grid Corporation of China and was appointed its Party Secretary and general manager in 2004. The Times reported that in this role he had "been forced into fire-fighting outrage at home after the worst snowstorms in half a century crippled power lines, blacked out cities and brought the electrified railways to a standstill."

In 2008, Liu created State Grid International Development Company to oversee State Grid's foreign investments. During Liu's tenure at State Grid, the enterprise made foreign acquisitions in Australia, Brazil, Italy, the Philippines, and Portugal.

In 2013, State Grid established a Board of Directors at its holding company level and Liu became its Chairman. He continued to serve as Party Secretary. Liu adopted the strategy of "one special, four large": the development of UHV power grids (the "one special") and hydropower, coal power, nuclear power, and renewable energy (the "four large").

Liu increased State Grid's investment in UHV research and development, creating a UHV Power Grid Engineering Group and a UHV Grid Engineering Working Group.

In 2016, Liu retired from State Grid.

Liu joined the CPC in 1984. He is currently Chairman of Global Energy Interconnection Development and Cooperation Organization (GEIDCO) and an alternate of the 17th CPC Central Committee.

In 2018 he was elected an International Fellow of the Royal Academy of Engineering in the UK.
