= Yan Rongzhu =

Chinese politician

Yan Rongzhu (Chinese: 焉荣竹; pinyin: Yān Róngzhú; born November 1952) is a Chinese politician, best known for his term as the Chinese Communist Party Committee Secretary of Jinan, the capital of Shandong province, between 2007 and 2012, and prior to that, as party chief of Yantai, between 2001 and 2006.

Born in Rushan, Shandong, Yan graduated from the Shandong Agriculture Mechanical College (now part of Shandong University of Technology). He joined the Chinese Communist Party (CCP) in September 1971. He began his political career in Weihai, then became vice mayor, mayor, and CCP Deputy Committee Secretary of Rizhao. He served as Rizhao's mayor between 1998 and 2001, before going to Yantai. He also briefly served between 2006 and 2007 as the head of the provincial Publicity Department in Shandong. He was a member of the provincial Party Standing Committee of Shandong.

Yan was an alternate member of the 17th Central Committee of the CCP. In October 2010, he was elevated from alternate to full member. In February 2012, after reaching the retirement age of 60, he was given the largely ceremonial role of Vice Chairman of the Shandong People's Political Consultative Conference.

Party political offices
Preceded by Jiang Daming	Communist Party Secretary of Jinan; 2007 – 2012	Succeeded by Wang Min
