= Wang Mingfang =

Chinese politician

- 王明方

Chairmen of Anhui CPPCC
- In office March 2011 – September 2016
- Preceded by: Yang Duoliang
- Succeeded by: Xu Liquan

Personal details
- Born: November 1952 Longjiang County, Heilongjiang, China
- Died: September 16, 2016 (aged 63) Shanghai, China
- Party: Chinese Communist Party

Wang Mingfang (Chinese: 王明方; November 1952 – 16 September 2016) was a Chinese politician who served as Chairman of the Anhui Provincial Committee of the Chinese People's Political Consultative Conference (CPPCC) from 2011 until his death in 2016.

== Career ==
Wang was born in Longjiang County, Heilongjiang Province. Wang joined the Chinese Communist Party in 1997. He first became part of the Anhui CPPCC provincial committee in 1997. From 2002 to 2015, he was an alternate of the 16th and 17th Central Committee of the Chinese Communist Party.

In June 2015, Wang led the Anhui province delegation, in a 2-day state visit, to the Ústí nad Labem Region, Czech Republic. The aim of the visit was to strengthen mutual ties between Anhui and Ústí.

On 16 September 2016, Wang died of an illness in Shanghai, at the age of 63.
