= Shi Dahua =

Chinese state-owned enterprise executive

Shi Dahua (born 1951, Chinese: 石大华) is a former state-owned enterprise (SOE) executive and the chairman and Chinese Communist Party Committee Secretary of China Railway Engineering Corporation (CREC).

== Biography ==
Shi Dahua was born in 1951 in Hubei. At age 17, he joined the People's Liberation Army, in which he served for more than ten years. He then began working at the Ministry of Railways and earned a university degree in engineering management. Beginning in 1995, he served on the Chinese Communist Party (CCP) committee for China Railway Construction and then on the CCP committee of CREC in 1997.

In 2006, Shi became the chairman and CCP Committee Secretary of CREC. Shi oversaw limited diversification of CREC's core business (constructing transportation infrastructure and municipal projects) into the related areas of real estate, trade, and logistics. During Shi's tenure, CREC transferred, restructured, or sold, almost 100 subsidiaries unrelated to its core business. As part of its limited diversification, CREC created the subsidiary China Railway Real Estate Group. CREC focused primarily on China's domestic market, but Shi increased its international business as well.

During Shi's tenure, CREC acquired 22 railway construction SOEs. These acquisitions increased CREC's assets by 25%.

In 2007, CREC created the subsidiary China Railway Group Limited and listed some of its shares for sale on the Hong Kong stock exchange and the Shanghai stock exchange the next year.

Shi was an alternate to the 17th Central Committee of the Chinese Communist Party.

In 2010, Shi was appointed to the State-owned Assets Supervision and Administration Commission's (SASAC) board of supervisors and left CREC. In November 2014, the State Council dismissed Shi Dahua from his position as chairman of the Supervisory Board of Key State-owned Large Enterprises.

== See also ==
- Rail transport in China
