= Xu Lejiang =

Chinese businessman

Xu Lejiang (Chinese: 徐乐江; born April 1959) is a Chinese politician and former state-owned company executive. For nearly ten years, between 2007 and 2016, Xu was the chairman of Baosteel Group. He is currently serving as deputy head of the United Front Work Department and the Chinese Communist Party Committee Secretary and executive vice chairman of the All-China Federation of Industry and Commerce (minister-level).

== Education ==
Xu was born in Xintai, Shandong. He joined the Chinese Communist Party in June 1976. In 1982, Xu graduated from the Jiangxi Institute of Metallurgy, now known as Jiangxi University of Science and Technology, and majored in Metallurgy Machinery. In 2000, Xu received his MBA from a joint program between Fudan University and The University of Hong Kong.

== Career ==
In January 2007, Xu was named Chairman of Baosteel Group, a Global Fortune 500 company based in Shanghai, China. In October 2016 the group merged with Wuhan Steel Group to form China Baowu Steel Group. In May 2017, Xu was named deputy head of the United Front Work Department, and the Chinese Communist Party Committee Secretary and executive vice chairman of the All-China Federation of Industry and Commerce.

Xu was an alternate of the 17th and the 18th Central Committee of the Chinese Communist Party, and a member of the 19th Central Committee of the Chinese Communist Party.
