= Lin Zuoming =

- 林左鸣
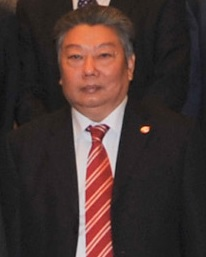
- Lin Zuoming in October 2013

Chairman of the Board of the Aviation Industry Corporation of China
- In office April 2012 – May 2018
- Preceded by: New title
- Succeeded by: Tan Ruisong

Personal details
- Born: May 1957 (age 69) Zhao'an County, Fujian, China
- Party: Chinese Communist Party
- Education: Nanjing University of Aeronautics and Astronautics; Cheung Kong Graduate School of Business; Beijing University of Aeronautics and Astronautics

Chinese name
- Simplified Chinese: 林左鸣
- Traditional Chinese: 林左鳴
Transcriptions
Standard Mandarin
- Hanyu Pinyin: Lín Zuǒmíng

Lin Zuoming (Chinese: 林左鸣; born May 1957) is a Chinese business chief executive and politician who served as chairman of the Board of the Aviation Industry Corporation of China from 2012 to 2018. He previously served as general manager of the corporation and chairman of the Board of the AVIC I Commercial Aircraft and vice chairman of the Board of the Commercial Aircraft Corporation of China and before that, general manager and chairman of the Board of China Aviation Industry Corporation I. He is the current chairman of the Chinese Society of Aeronautics and Astronautics.

He was a delegate to the 9th National People's Congress. He a representative of the 17th National Congress of the Chinese Communist Party. He was an alternate of the 16th and 17th Central Committee of the Chinese Communist Party and a member of the 18th Central Committee of the Chinese Communist Party.

== Biography ==
Lin was born in Zhao'an County, Fujian, in May 1957. He secondary studied at Zhangzhou No. 1 High School. After the Cultural Revolution in June 1976, he became a sent-down youth in Longhai County (now Longhai District of Zhangzhou). After resuming the college entrance examination, in 1978, he entered Nanjing Aeronautical Institute (now Nanjing University of Aeronautics and Astronautics), where he majored in aero-engine design. He joined the Chinese Communist Party (CCP) in June 1981.

After graduation in 1982, he was assigned to and assumed various posts in the 420th Factory of the Ministry of Aviation Industry (later renamed Chengdu Engine Company, now Chengdu Engine Group Co., Ltd.). In October 1992, he was named deputy general manager of Chengdu Engine Company, rising to general manager in March 1995. He also served as interim chairman of the company between December 1997 and October 1998. He was made general manager of Shenyang Liming Aero-Engine Co., Ltd. in October 1998, concurrently serving as deputy party secretary since June 1999. He served as deputy general manager of China Aviation Industry Corporation I in July 2001, and five years later promoted to the general manager position. He concurrently served as chairman and party branch secretary from May 2006 to June 2008. He was appointed vice chairman of the Board of the Commercial Aircraft Corporation of China in June 2008, concurrently serving as general manager and party branch secretary of the Board of the Aviation Industry Corporation of China and chairman of the Board of the AVIC I Commercial Aircraft. In April 2012, he rose to chairman of the Board of the Aviation Industry Corporation of China, and served until May 2018.

== Awards ==
- 2010 State Science and Technology Progress Award (Special Award)

Business positions
New title	General Manager of the Aviation Industry Corporation of China; 2008–2012	Succeeded by Tan Ruisong
New title	Chairman of the Board of the Aviation Industry Corporation of China; 2012–2018	Succeeded by Tan Ruisong
Cultural offices
Preceded by Liu Gaozhuo	Chairman of the Chinese Society of Aeronautics and Astronautics; 2014–present	Incumbent
