= Zhao Aiming =

Chinese Politician

- 赵爱明

Deputy Director of the State-owned Assets Supervision and Administration Commission
- In office February 2019 – November 2021
- Director: Xiao Yaqing→Hao Peng

Personal details
- Born: October 1961 (age 64–65) Anyang, Henan, China
- Party: Chinese Communist Party
- Education: University of Electronic Science and Technology of China; Tsinghua University

Chinese name
- Simplified Chinese: 赵爱明
- Traditional Chinese: 趙愛明
Transcriptions
Standard Mandarin
- Hanyu Pinyin: Zhào àimíng

Zhao Aiming (Chinese: 赵爱明; born October 1961) is a Chinese politician who served as deputy director of the State-owned Assets Supervision and Administration Commission from 2019 to 2021.

Zhao was an alternate of the 17th, 18th, and 19th Central Committee of the Chinese Communist Party. She was a delegate to the 10th National People's Congress.

== Early life and education ==
Zhao was born in Anyang, Henan, in October 1961. After resuming the college entrance examination, in 1979, she was accepted to Chengdu Institute of Telecommunication (now University of Electronic Science and Technology of China), where she majored in electronic materials. After graduating in 1982, she was assigned as an assistant engineer of the No. 3 Design Institute of No. 715 Factory. She also received her Doctor of Management degree from Tsinghua University in June 2011.

== Career in Sichuan ==
Zhao got involved in politics in November 1984, when she became an official of the Political Research Office of Sichuan Provincial Science and Technology Commission, and eventually becoming its deputy director in March 1997. She joined the Chinese Communist Party (CCP) in July 1985. In March 2003, she was appointed director of Sichuan Intellectual Property Office, but having held the position for only ten months. In January 2004, Zhao was named acting mayor of Panzhihua, confirmed in the following month. In January 2005, she rose to become party secretary, the top political position in the cit, concurrently serving as chairwoman of Panzhihua Municipal People's Congress since February that same year. In January 2011, she became director and party secretary of the State owned Assets Supervision and Administration Commission of Sichuan, a post she kept until January 2013, when she was promoted to vice chairperson of Sichuan Provincial People's Congress.

== Career in Jiangxi ==
Zhao was appointed head of Organization Department of the CCP Jiangxi Provincial Committee in July 2013 and was admitted to member of the Standing Committee of the CCP Jiangxi Provincial Committee, the province's top authority.

== Career in central government ==
In February 2019, Zhao was transferred to Beijing and was chosen as deputy director of the State-owned Assets Supervision and Administration Commission.

Government offices
Preceded by Peng Yanzhi	Director of Sichuan Intellectual Property Office; 2003–2004	Succeeded by Huang Feng
Preceded by Qin Yizhi	Mayor of Panzhihua; 2004–2005	Succeeded by Sun Ping
Preceded by Peng Yu	Director of the State owned Assets Supervision and Administration Commission of Sichuan; 2011–2013	Succeeded by Liu Guoqiang
Party political offices
Preceded by Zhang Chengming	Communist Party Secretary of Panzhihua; 2005–2011	Succeeded by Liu Chengming
Preceded by Mo Jiancheng	Head of Organization Department of the Jiangxi Provincial Committee of the Chinese Communist Party; 2013–2019	Succeeded by Liu Qiang
