= Jin Zhenji =

Chinese politician (born 1959)

- Simplified Chinese: 金振吉
Transcriptions
Standard Mandarin
- Hanyu Pinyin: Jīn Zhènjí

Chinese Korean name
- Chosŏn'gŭl: 김진길
Transcriptions
- Revised Romanization: Gim Jingil
- McCune–Reischauer: Kim Chin'gil

Jin Zhenji or Kim Jin-gil (Chinese: 金振吉; Korean: 김진길; born February 1959) is a Chinese politician of Korean ethnic origin. He joined the Chinese Communist Party in November 1979. He attended Jilin University and earned a degree in global economics. He successively served as the head of the Communist Youth League organization in Jilin, the prefecture commissioner of Yanbian Korean Autonomous Prefecture. In March 2007, he became vice governor of Jilin; in April 2011, he was named the head of the Political and Legal Affairs Commission of Jilin province, and a member of the Chinese Communist Party Provincial Standing Committee.

Jin was an alternate of the 17th and 18th Central Committee of the Chinese Communist Party; he was elevated to full membership of the 18th Central Committee in October 2015, upon the expulsion of Central Committee member Yang Dongliang.
