= Zhu Zhengchang =

Chinese politician

- Chinese: 朱正昌
Transcriptions
Standard Mandarin
- Hanyu Pinyin: Zhū Zhèng chāng

Zhu Zhengchang (born November 1944) is a Chinese politician in Shandong. He served as deputy director of the Standing Committee of the Shandong People's Congress and party secretary of Shandong University until October 2011.

Zhu was born in Chongming County, Shanghai and studied marine engineering at the Wuhan Waterway Engineering College and Dalian Maritime University. He became a member of the Chinese Communist Party in 1967. Since 1984, he has held various provincial-level party posts. He has also been executive vice president of the Chinese Confucius Foundation that was established in 1984 to advance the study of traditional Chinese culture and promote international cultural exchange. Since January 2005, he has been Deputy Director of the Standing Committee of the Shandong People's Congress and since February 2005, party secretary of Shandong University.

Academic offices
Preceded by	Party Secretary of Shandong University –2011	Succeeded by Li Shouxin
