= Lei Chunmei =

Chinese politician

Lei Chunmei (Chinese: 雷春美; pinyin: Léi Chūnměi; born January 1959) is a Chinese politician of She ethnic heritage currently serving as the head of the United Front Work Department in Fujian, a province in southeastern China, and a member of the standing committee of the Fujian Provincial Committee of the Chinese Communist Party. She has been a standing committee member since January 2015.

== Biography ==
In January 1959, Lei was born in Fu'an County, Fujian province China. Lei is Chinese with ancestry of the She (畲) people. Lei has a degree in mechanical engineering from Fuzhou University. Lei has a master's degree in economics from Xiamen University.

After joining the Chinese Communist Party in 1978, Lei has successively served as the vice mayor of Ningde, the head of the Communist Youth League provincial organization in Fujian, the vice mayor of Fuzhou, the mayor of Longyan, and the party chief of Nanping.

In 2012, Lei became head of the Fujian provincial party organization's United Front Work Department.

Lei is an alternate of the 17th and the 18th Central Committee of the Chinese Communist Party.
