= Wang Xinxian =

Chinese politician and disability activist

- 王新宪
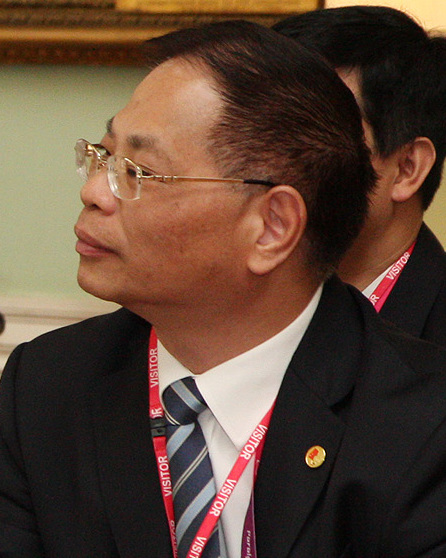

Vice-Chairman of the China Disabled Persons' Federation
- Incumbent
- Assumed office 10 September 2003
- Chairman: Deng Pufang

Director of Social and Legal Committee of the Chinese People's Political Consultative Conference
- Incumbent
- Assumed office 20 November 2013

Personal details
- Born: November 1954 (age 71) Qin County, Shanxi, China
- Party: Chinese Communist Party
- Education: South China Normal University; Central Party School of the Chinese Communist Party
- Occupation: Politician, economist

Wang Xinxian (simplified Chinese: 王新宪; traditional Chinese: 王新憲; pinyin: Wāng Xīnxiàn; born November 1954) is a Chinese public figure, currently serving as the Director-General of the China Disabled Persons' Federation. Born in Qin County, Shanxi, he graduated from South China Normal University. He also studied economics at the Central Party School of the Chinese Communist Party. Wang is disabled. He served on the boards of associations for the disabled in Guangdong province, before joining the China Disabled Persons' Federation in 2003 as a vice chairman, then becoming chairman in October 2008.

Wang served as an alternate of the 17th Central Committee of the Chinese Communist Party (elected with highest number of confirmation votes), but was elevated to full membership after the expulsion of Yu Youjun, and a full member of the 18th Central Committee.
