= Li Andong =

Chinese retired general

- 李安东

Deputy Head of the People's Liberation Army General Armaments Department
- In office December 2000 – 2014
- Head: Cao Gangchuan

Personal details
- Born: July 1946 (age 80) Xi'an, Shaanxi, China
- Party: Chinese Communist Party
- Education: Harbin Military Academy of Engineering

Military service
- Allegiance: People's Republic of China
- Branch/service: People's Liberation Army Ground Force
- Years of service: 1965–2014
- Rank: General

Chinese name
- Simplified Chinese: 李安东
- Traditional Chinese: 李安東
Transcriptions
Standard Mandarin
- Hanyu Pinyin: Lǐ Āndōng

Li Andong (Chinese: 李安东; born July 1946) is a retired general in the People's Liberation Army of China. He was a member of the 16th Central Committee of the Chinese Communist Party and an alternate of the 17th Central Committee of the Chinese Communist Party.

== Biography ==
Li was born in Xi'an, Shaanxi, in July 1946. He enlisted in the People's Liberation Army (PLA) in August 1965. He graduated from Harbin Military Academy of Engineering (now National University of Defense Technology), majoring in aviation. After university in 1970, he was despatched to the PLA Air Force. He joined the Chinese Communist Party (CCP) in December 1973. He was transferred to the People's Liberation Army General Staff Department in June 1985, becoming head of its Equipment Division in February 1993. In August 1998, he became assistant head of the People's Liberation Army General Armaments Department, rising to deputy head in December 2000.

He was promoted to the rank of major general (shaojiang) in July 1995, lieutenant general (zhongjiang) in July 2002, and general (shangjiang) in July 2010.

== Awards ==
- 31 August 2010 Order of Bohdan Khmelnytsky, 3rd Class (Ukraine)
