= Fu Zhifang =

Chinese politician

Fu Zhifang (Chinese: 付志方; born October 1956) is a Chinese politician from Nanyang, Henan. He was an alternate of the 17th Central Committee of the Chinese Communist Party and was once the mayor of Kaifeng and Baoding. He was later Chairman of the Hebei Provincial CPPCC Committee.

== Biography ==
Fu majored in history at Henan University and joined the Chinese Communist Party in June 1982. Between 1982 and 1986, he held various prefecture-level posts and graduated from the Henan Provincial CCP School.

He was appointed the prefecture secretary for Lushi County in November 1987. By March 1990, he was both the county's secretary and mayor. Amidst his political career, he attained his master's degree Tianjin University in September 1996. He was the mayor and party secretary of Kaifeng from July 1997 to December 1998.

Fu was transferred to Baoding as the party secretary and mayor for the city in December 1998. In August 2010, he was made deputy secretary of Hebei. In January 2012, he was made the CPPCC Chair in Hebei Province.

Fu was an alternate of the 17th Central Committee of the Chinese Communist Party.
