= Liu Wei (born 1958) =

Chinese politician

Liu Wei (Chinese: 刘伟, born 1958) is the current chairman of the CPPCC Henan Committee, a post he acquired in 2018. He was born in 1958 in Tengzhou City, Shandong Province. He joined the Chinese Communist Party (CCP) in 1980. Liu's first mayor office was being mayor of Wuhu City, Anhui Province from 1996 to 1998. During this time, he earned his bachelor's degree from Party School of the CCP Central Committee. He was the delegate of 9th National People's Congress from 1998 to 2003. Liu also serves as Deputy Secretary of the CCP Provincial Committee of Shandong Province since 2007. He was an alternate member of the 17th CCP Central Committee.
