= 18th Central Committee of the Chinese Communist Party =

2012–2017 Central Committee

18th Central Committee
- Emblem of the Chinese Communist Party

15 November 2012 – 23 October 2017

Leadership
- General Secretary: Xi Jinping
- Politburo Standing Committee: 7
- Politburo: 25
- Secretariat: 7

Members
- Total: 205

Alternates
- Total: 171

Apparatus
- Head of General Office: Li Zhanshu
- No. of departments: 4

The 18th Central Committee of the Chinese Communist Party was elected by the 18th National Congress on 15 November 2012, and sat in plenary sessions until the communing of the 19th National Congress in 2017. It was formally proceeded by the 17th Central Committee.

The first plenary session in 2012 was responsible for electing the bodies in which the authority of the Central Committee was invested when it was not in session: the Politburo and the Politburo Standing Committee. It was also responsible for approving the members of the Secretariat, Central Commission of Discipline Inspection and its Standing Committee. The second plenary session in March 2013 was responsible for nominating candidates for state positions.

The remaining plenary sessions of the 18th Central Committee were known for announcing a wide range of reform programs on a scale unprecedented since the Deng era, including "comprehensively deepening reforms", "ruling the country according to law", and complete the construction of a "moderately prosperous society". The 18th CC also saw the highest number of members expelled from the body due to corruption in the party's history.

The 18th CC was elected using the method "more candidates than seats". (Note: Prior to the 1980s, the composition of the Central Committee was essentially pre-determined by the party's top leaders. However, beginning at the 13th Party Congress in 1987, the number of candidates standing for office had been increased to be greater than the number of seats available. With this method, the candidates that receive the lowest confirmation votes in favour at a party congress would not be elected.) At the 18th National Congress, delegates could vote for 224 possible candidates for 205 seats for full membership, and 190 candidates for the 171 alternate members. 8.5 percent of the member candidates and 10 percent of the alternate candidates failed to be elected. Of the 373 full and alternate members, 184 of them (i.e., 48.9 percent) were elected to the Central Committee for the first time. Five of the nine members born in the 1960s were associated with the Communist Youth League (designated as Tuanpai by foreign commentators).

Few offspring of previously high-standing officials (known as "princelings") managed to obtain full membership on the 18th CC, though a few were named alternate members. (Note: It is notable that Li Xiaopeng, the son of Li Peng, gathered the fewest votes of those elected to alternate membership, making him rank last on the alternate member list. Li served as Governor of Shanxi during his term as an alternate member of the Central Committee.) The number of members who worked in central-controlled state-owned enterprises increased from one in the 17th CC to six, while Zhang Ruimin (head of Haier) was re-elected. The number of members from the military remained constant from the previous committee at around 20 percent, continuing a longstanding tradition.

== Keys ==
Abbreviations
IDUCC	Institutions Directly Under the Central Committee
K	Keys
CIM	Central institution membership, which in this instance means membership in the PSC, PB, ST and CMC
PSC	Standing Committee of the Political Bureau
PB	Political Bureau
ST	Secretariat
CMC	Central Military Commission
SC–CCDI	Standing Committee of the Central Commission for Discipline Inspection
CCDI	Central Commission for Discipline Inspection
CPPCC	Chinese People's Political Consultative Conference
NL	National Leader
DNL	Deputy National Leader
PM	Provincial-Ministerial
SPM	Sub-provincial (vice-ministerial)
DE	Department-prefecture level
Adm.	Admiral
V-Adm.	Vice-Admiral
Gen.	General
Lt. Gen.	Lieutenant General
Maj. Gen.	Major General
Keys
♀	Indicates that the individual is female.
↑	Indicates that the individual was elevated from alternate to member
♮	Indicates that the individual was expelled from the Communist Party after CCDI investigation.
₪	Indicates that the individual was placed under investigation by the CCDI and disciplined, but the results have not been publicly announced, or that they have been demoted but not expelled from the party
∞	Indicates that the individual is retired from active political positions (Note: "Active" political positions refer to the offices of Governor and provincial-level Party Secretary; often, an individual is considered retired when they relinquish either of those offices due to age, and are assigned some kind of committee membership in the National People's Congress.)
§	Indicates that the individual is military personnel.
↔	Indicates that the individual is military personnel and has retired from active military service.
Note	If two keys are used in the same column it indicates that the individual is both of something. For instance, "♀§" indicates that the individual is female (♀) and military personnel (§).

== Plenums ==
Plenum	Start–end	Length	Summary
1st Plenary Session	15 November 2012	1 day	Xi Jinping was elected General Secretary and CMC Chairman. A 25-member Politburo, 7-member Politburo Standing Committee and seven member Secretariat with Liu Yunshan as first-ranking secretary were elected. The plenum approved the composition SC–CCDI elected by the CCDI 1st Plenary Session, and the election of Wang Qishan as CCDI Secretary, CCDI Secretary-General and several CCDI deputy secretaries.
2nd Plenary Session	26–28 February 2013	3 days	The meeting approved lists of nominees for leading posts within the 12th National People's Congress and the 12th CPPCC National Committee, as well as a State Council restructuring plan aimed at a "simpler and decentralized administration".
3rd Plenary Session	9–12 November 2013	4 days	Xi Jinping made a report on behalf of the Politburo titled the Decision on Several Major Issues Concerning Comprehensively Deepening Reform. The Decision described public finance as "the foundation and an important pillar of state governance. Good fiscal and taxation systems are the institutional guarantee for optimizing resource allocation, maintaining market unity, promoting social equity, and realizing enduring peace and stability." Market allocation of resources was given, in official speech, a "decisive role". Regarding state-owned enterprises, the Third Plenum promoted the concept of the mixed ownership and emphasized "enabling capital of all kinds of ownership to draw on one another's strong points to offset weaknesses, stimulate one another, and develop jointly." Procedures were taken to liberalize the banking system, with the goal of achieving significant results by 2020. The National Security Commission and the Central Leading Group for Comprehensively Deepening Reforms were established, and both are led by Xi. The meeting anticipated the abolition of re-education through labour and an easing to the one-child policy.
4th Plenary Session	20–23 October 2014	4 days	The Fourth Plenary session focused on the theme of "comprehensively deepening law-based governance." It passed a comprehensive package of legal reforms. The decision upheld the supremacy of Communist Party rule and emphasized the importance of the Constitution. It resolved to establish circuit tribunals (巡视法庭) and cross-jurisdictional circuit courts and prosecution agencies. The decision also said that management of court resources of in municipal and lower level courts would be managed directly by the provincial level. In 2014, the Fourth Plenum of the 18th Central Committee announced "lifelong accountability" for major operational and investment decisions made by top officials in the public sector. The Central Committee passed resolution to expel Yang Jinshan, Jiang Jiemin, and Li Dongsheng, officials who have been dismissed during the anti-corruption campaign launched after the 1st Plenary Session.
5th Plenary Session	26–29 October 2015	4 days	The session passed a draft of the 13th five-year plan, with provisions for combating poverty. Secondary education for children of less well-off families will gradually be made free, including any school fees; the document also called for a "comprehensively well-off society" by 2020 and a total elimination of "poverty counties" (pinkunxian), and a universal relaxation of the one-child policy: any married couples could now have two children. The Central Committee passed a resolution confirming the expulsion of CC members Ling Jihua, Zhou Benshun, Yang Dongliang, and CC alternate members Zhu Mingguo, Wang Min, Chen Chuanping, Qiu He, Yang Weize, Pan Yiyang, and Yu Yuanhui from the party; at the time, this was the largest ever number of CC members expelled during any CC plenum due to corruption; the record was broken two years later at the 7th plenum.
6th Plenary Session	24–27 October 2016	4 days	The 6th plenum's main focus was on "strict discipline and supervision of the Communist Party." The Central Committee passed a resolution confirming the expulsion of CC member Wang Min, and CC alternate members Lü Xiwen, Fan Changmi, and Niu Zhizhong. Xi Jinping strove for greater transparency in the decision-making process in local governance, which also represents his effort to establish a positive image of China's Communist Party overseas. This is in addition to his actively promoted anti-corruption campaign within China's political system. Xi was declared the "leadership core" of the party.
7th Plenary Session	11–14 October 2017	4 days	The 7th plenum was the final plenary session of the 18th Central Committee, convened to affirm achievements of the past five years and laying the groundwork for the 19th Party Congress. The plenum confirmed the expulsion of Sun Zhengcai, Wu Aiying, (Note: Wu Aiying's expulsion from the party at the plenum was the first public announcement of her downfall; she had been Minister of Justice earlier in 2017 and seemingly retired without much fanfare.) Su Shulin, Wang Sanyun, Xiang Junbo, Wang Jianping, Tian Xiusi, Li Yunfeng, Yang Chongyong, and Mo Jiancheng from the Communist Party; confirmed the two-year party probation issued to Li Liguo and Yang Huanning; confirmed the removal of Zhang Xiwu from all party positions. The plenum saw the greatest number of expulsions at a single plenum post-Cultural Revolution party history.

== Working Organs ==
=== Heads of department-level institutions ===
Institution	Name (birth–death)	Hanzi	Took office	Left office	Tenure
Central Commission for Discipline Inspection Organs	Wang Qishan (born 1948)	王岐山	15 November 2012	25 October 2017	4 years and 344 days
Central International Liaison Department	Wang Jiarui (born 1949)	王家瑞	15 November 2012	16 November 2015	3 years and 1 day
Central International Liaison Department	Song Tao (born 1955)	宋涛	16 November 2015	23 October 2017	1 year and 341 days
Central Organization Department	Zhao Leji (born 1957)	赵乐际	15 November 2012	25 October 2017	4 years and 344 days
Central Policy Research Office	Wang Huning (born 1955)	王沪宁	15 November 2012	23 October 2017	4 years and 342 days
Central Political and Legal Affairs Commission	Meng Jianzhu (born 1947)	孟建柱	15 November 2012	25 October 2017	4 years and 344 days
Central Publicity Department	Liu Qibao (born 1953)	刘奇葆	21 November 2012	25 October 2017	4 years and 338 days
Central Taiwan Task Office	Wang Yi (born 1953)	王毅	15 November 2012	17 March 2013	122 days
Central Taiwan Task Office	Zhang Zhijun (born 1953)	张志军	17 March 2013	23 October 2017	4 years and 220 days
Central United Front Work Department	Ling Jihua (born 1956)	令计划	15 November 2012	31 December 2013	2 years and 46 days
Central United Front Work Department	Sun Chunlan (born 1950)	孙春兰	31 December 2014	25 October 2017	2 years and 298 days
General Office	Li Zhanshu (born 1950)	栗战书	15 November 2012	25 October 2017	4 years and 344 days
General Office of the Central Institutional Organization Commission	Wang Yongqing (born 1959)	汪永清	15 November 2012	April 2013	137 days
General Office of the Central Institutional Organization Commission	Zhang Jinan (born 1957)	张纪南	April 2013	23 October 2017	4 years and 205 days
General Office of the Central Leading Group for Financial and Economic Affairs	Zhu Zhixin (born 1949)	朱之鑫	15 November 2012	March 2013	106 days
General Office of the Central Leading Group for Financial and Economic Affairs	Liu He (born 1952)	刘鹤	March 2013	23 October 2017	4 years and 236 days
General Office of the Foreign Affairs Leading Group	Dai Bingguo (born 1941)	戴秉国	15 November 2012	14 March 2013	119 days
General Office of the Foreign Affairs Leading Group	Yang Jiechi (born 1950)	杨洁篪	14 March 2013	23 October 2017	4 years and 223 days
International Communications Office	Wang Chen (born 1950)	王晨	15 November 2012	14 March 2013	119 days
International Communications Office	Cai Mingzhao (born 1955)	蔡名照	14 March 2013	December 2014	1 year and 262 days
International Communications Office	Jiang Jianguo (born 1956)	蒋建国	January 2015	23 October 2017	2 years and 295 days
Working Committee of Organs Directly Under the Central Committee	Li Zhanshu (born 1950)	栗战书	15 November 2012	25 October 2017	4 years and 344 days

=== Heads of IDUCC institutions ===
Institution	Name (birth–death)	Hanzi	Took office	Left office	Tenure
Central Compilation and Translation Bureau	Yi Junqing (born 1958)	衣俊卿	15 November 2012	15 January 2013	61 days
Central Compilation and Translation Bureau	Jia Gaojian (born 1959)	贾高建	15 January 2013	23 October 2017	4 years and 281 days
Central Literature Research Office	Leng Rong (born 1953)	冷溶	15 November 2012	23 October 2017	3 years and 326 days
Central Party History Research Centre	Ouyang Song (born 1948)	欧阳淞	15 November 2012	December 2013	1 year and 16 days
Central Party History Research Centre	Qu Qingshan (born 1957)	曲青山	December 2013	23 October 2017	3 years and 326 days
Central Party School	Liu Yunshan (born 1947)	刘云山	15 January 2013	25 October 2017	4 years and 283 days
China Executive Leadership Academy, Jinggangshan	Zhao Leji (born 1957)	赵乐际	15 November 2012	25 October 2017	4 years and 344 days
China Executive Leadership Academy, Pudong	Zhao Leji (born 1957)	赵乐际	15 November 2012	25 October 2017	4 years and 344 days
China Executive Leadership Academy, Yan'an	Zhao Leji (born 1957)	赵乐际	15 November 2012	25 October 2017	4 years and 344 days
Guangming Daily	He Dongping (born 1955)	何东平	15 November 2012	23 October 2017	4 years and 342 days
People's Daily	Zhang Yannong (born 1948)	张研农	15 November 2012	30 April 2014	1 year and 166 days
People's Daily	Yang Zhenwu (born 1955)	杨振武	30 April 2014	23 October 2017	3 years and 176 days
Qiushi	Li Baoshan (born 1955)	李宝善	15 November 2012	30 April 2014	1 year and 166 days
Qiushi	Li Jie (born 1955)	李捷	1 May 2014	23 October 2017	3 years and 175 days

== Membership ==
=== Members ===
Notes

- Name, Ethnicity, Office, Rank and institutional membership are listed in accordance with the Hanzi column, but can be sorted alphabetical by pressing the button next to the column titles.
- The Hanzi column is listed according to the number of strokes in their surnames, which is the official ordering method.
- Ranks listed are the highest rank each individual held during their term; if they were promoted from sub-provincial level to provincial-ministerial level during their term on the Central Committee, they would be listed under a provincial-ministerial level rank; military ranks are listed separately from civilian ranks, with the exception of military officials who hold positions on civilian bodies, in which case both military and civilian ranks are listed
- The Office column lists offices that the individual held during their term on the Central Committee (i.e. between 2012 and 2017) and is not intended to be an exhaustive list of offices they held over the course of their career; if the individual was transferred between different offices, dates are included to indicate the time period they held each office. Generally, offices held between the conclusion of the 18th Party Congress and the National People's Congress in March 2013 are excluded. Dates reflect the term of office only within the duration of the CC session; therefore someone whose term in parentheses indicates 2012–2015, for example, does not necessarily imply that they held the office beginning in 2012; similarly, those whose term ends in 2017 does not necessarily indicate that they relinquished that office in 2017.
- Only substantive offices are listed; for example it is customary that an individual will hold office both as provincial party secretary and chair of the provincial People's Congress. In this table, the latter title is not listed.

Name (birth–death)	Hanzi	K	Ethnicity	Office	Rank	Portrait	CIM & CCDI membership
Yu Guangzhou (born 1953)	于广洲	—	Han	Director, General Administration of Customs	PM		—
Xi Jinping (born 1953)	习近平	—	Han	General Secretary, Central Committee; Chairman, Central Military Commission; President of the People's Republic of China; Chairman, National Security Commission	NL	a smiling man, wearing a suit and a checked tie while looking straight into the camera	PSC, PB, CMC
Ma Kai (born 1946)	马凯	—	Han	Vice Premier, State Council	DNL	a man looking leftwards (away from the camera), wearing a suit and a red tie	PB
Ma Biao (born 1954)	马飚	—	Zhuang	Vice Chairman, National Committee of the Chinese People's Political Consultative Conference	DNL	—	—
Ma Xingrui (born 1959)	马兴瑞	—	Han	Deputy Secretary, Guangdong Provincial Committee (2013–2015); Secretary, Shenzhen Municipal Committee (2015–2017); Governor of Guangdong (2017)	PM	a serious looking man, wearing suit and a blue tie	—
Ma Xiaotian (born 1949)	马晓天	§	Han	Commander-in-chief, People's Liberation Army Air Force	Gen.	a man with a short haircut, wearing a military uniform	CMC
Wang Jun (born 1952)	王君	∞	Han	Secretary, Inner Mongolia Autonomous Regional Committee (2012–2016)	PM	—	—
Wang Xia (born 1954)	王侠	♀	Han	Secretary, Central Committee of the All-China Federation of Supply and Marketing Cooperation	PM	—	—
Wang Min (born 1950)	王珉	♮∞	Han	Secretary, Liaoning Provincial Committee (2012–2015)	PM	—	—
Wang Yong (born 1955)	王勇	—	Han	State Councillor	DNL	—	—
Wang Chen (born 1950)	王晨	—	Han	Vice Chairman, Standing Committee of the National People's Congress; Secretary-General, Standing Committee of the National People's Congress	PM	—	—
Wang Yi (born 1953)	王毅	—	Han	Minister of Foreign Affairs	PM	a man, wearing a suit and a black-greenish tie with a People's Republic of China badge on the right side of his suit	—
Wang Sanyun (born 1952)	王三运	♮∞	Han	Secretary, Gansu Provincial Committee (2012–2017)	PM	—	—
Wang Wanbin (born 1949)	王万宾	—	Han	Executive Deputy Secretary-General, Standing Committee of the National People's Congress	PM	—	—
Wang Yupu (born 1956)	王玉普	—	Han	Vice President, Chinese Academy of Engineering (2013–2015); Chairman, Sinopec (2015–2017); Director, State Administration of Work Safety (2017)	PM	—	—
Wang Zhengwei (born 1957)	王正伟	—	Hui	Vice-chairman, Chinese People's Political Consultative Conference; Chairman, State Ethnic Affairs Commission (2012–2016)	DNL	a man with a choppy haircut, wearing a suit and a tie while holding looking rightwards (away from the camera)	—
Wang Dongming (born 1956)	王东明	—	Han	Secretary, Sichuan Provincial Committee	PM		—
Wang Guangya (born 1950)	王光亚	∞	Han	Director, Hong Kong and Macau Affairs Office (2012–2017)	PM	a nearly bald man, wearing glasses, a suit and a purple tie	—
Wang Weiguang (born 1950)	王伟光	—	Han	President, Chinese Academy of Social Sciences	PM	—	—
Wang Anshun (born 1957)	王安顺	—	Han	Mayor of Beijing (2012–2016); Party Secretary, Development Research Center of the State Council (2016–2017)	PM		—
Wang Zhigang (Note: Wang Zhigang's position is unusual in that he is a party branch secretary of a ministry, as opposed to a minister. In most cases, a minister is concurrently the party branch secretary of the ministry. In this case, the Minister of Science and Technology, Wan Gang, is not a member of the Communist Party, so Wang tends to party duties at the ministry and is ranked as a full minister-level official.) (born 1958)	王志刚	—	Han	Secretary, Party Branch of the Ministry of Science and Technology	PM		—
Wang Qishan (born 1948)	王岐山	—	Han	Secretary, Central Commission for Discipline Inspection	NL	a smiling nearly bald man, wearing a suit and a blue tie	PSC, PB, SC–CCDI, CCDI
Wang Huning (born 1955)	王沪宁	—	Han	Director, Policy Research Office	DNL		PB
Wang Guosheng (born 1956)	王国生	—	Han	Governor of Hubei (2012–2016); Secretary, Qinghai Provincial Committee (2016–2017)	PM	—	—
Wang Xuejun (born 1952)	王学军	∞	Han	Governor of Anhui (2013–2015); Secretary, Anhui Provincial Committee (2015–2016)	PM	—	—
Wang Jianping (born 1953)	王建平	♮§	Han	Commander, People's Armed Police (2012–2014); Deputy Chief of Staff, People's Liberation Army (2014–2016)	Gen.	—	—
Wang Shengjun (born 1946)	王胜俊	—	Han	Vice Chairman, Standing Committee of the National People's Congress	DNL		—
Wang Hongyao (born 1951)	王洪尧	§	Han	Political Commissar, People's Liberation Army General Armaments Department	Gen.	—	—
Wang Xiankui (born 1952)	王宪魁	∞	Han	Secretary, Heilongjiang Provincial Committee (2013–2017)	PM	—	—
Wang Guanzhong (born 1953)	王冠中	§	Han	Deputy Chief of Staff, People's Liberation Army	Gen.	Wang Guanzhong	—
Wang Jiarui (born 1949)	王家瑞	—	Han	Head, International Liaison Department (2012–2015); Vice Chairman, Chinese People's Political Consultative Conference	DNL	a serious looking nearly bald man, wearing a suit and a dark coloured tie while holding a piece of paper	—
Wang Jiaocheng (born 1952)	王教成	§	Han	Commander, Shenyang Military Region	Gen.	—	—
Wang Xinxian (born 1954)	王新宪	—	Han	Chairman, Executive Board of the China Disabled Persons' Federation	—	—	—
Wang Rulin (born 1953)	王儒林	∞	Han	Secretary, Jilin Provincial Committee (2012–2014); Secretary, Shanxi Provincial Committee (2014–2016)	PM		—
Zhi Shuping (born 1953)	支树平	—	Han	Director, General Administration of Quality Supervision, Inspection and Quarantine	PM		—
You Quan (born 1954)	尤权	—	Han	Secretary, Fujian Provincial Committee	PM		—
Che Jun (born 1955)	车俊	—	Han	Governor of Zhejiang (2016–2017); Political Commissar, Xinjiang Production and Construction Corps (2012–2015); Deputy Secretary, Xinjiang Autonomous Regional Committee (2012–2016)	PM	—	—
Yin Weimin (born 1953)	尹蔚民	—	Han	Minister of Human Resources and Social Security	PM		—
Bayanqolu (born 1955)	巴音朝鲁	—	Mongol	Governor of Jilin (2012–2014); Secretary, Jilin Provincial Committee (2014–2017)	PM	—	—
Bagatur (born 1955)	巴特尔	—	Mongol	Chairman, Inner Mongolia Autonomous Region (2012–2016); Chairman, State Ethnic Affairs Commission (2016–2017)	PM	—	—
Lu Zhangong (born 1952)	卢展工	—	Han	Vice Chairman, National Committee of the Chinese People's Political Consultative Conference	DNL	—	—
Ye Xiaowen (born 1950)	叶小文	∞	Han	Branch Secretary, Central Institute of Socialism (2012–2016)	PM	—	—
Tian Zhong (born 1956)	田中	§	Han	Commander, North Sea Fleet (2012–2014); Deputy Commander, People's Liberation Army Navy (2014–2017)	V-Adm.	a man with a cropped haircut, wearing a white military uniform while looking leftwards (away from the camera)	—
Tian Xiusi (born 1950)	田修思	♮§	Han	Political Commissar, People's Liberation Army Air Force (2012–2015)	Gen.	—	—
Padma Choling (born 1952)	白玛赤林	—	Tibetan	Chairman, People's Congress of Tibet	PM	a serious-looking man, wearing glasses, a suit and a blue tie while looking rightwards (away from the camera)	—
Bai Chunli (born 1953)	白春礼	—	Han	President, Chinese Academy of Sciences	PM	a smiling, aged man, wearing glasses, a suit and a blue tie while looking straight into the camera	—
Ling Jihua (born 1956)	令计划	♮	Han	Vice Chairman, National Committee of the Chinese People's Political Consultative Conference (2013–2015); Head, United Front Work Department (2012–2014)	DNL		—
Ji Bingxuan (born 1951)	吉炳轩	—	Han	Vice Chairman, Standing Committee of the National People's Congress	DNL	—	—
Zhu Xiaodan (born 1953)	朱小丹	∞	Han	Governor of Guangdong (2012–2017)	PM	a smiling with wavy hair, wearing glasses, a suit and a blue tie while looking straight at the camera	—
Zhu Fuxi (born 1955)	朱福熙	§	Han	Political Commissar, Chengdu Military Region	Lt. Gen.	—	—
Quan Zhezhu (Note: Quan has been, since 2006, a minister-level official by virtue of his position as the party branch secretary of the All-China Federation of Industry and Commerce, which is nominally a non-partisan, apolitical body that is given ministry-level status for the purposes of administration and protocol. He is the only ethnic Korean full member of the Central Committee.) (born 1952)	全哲洙	—	Korean	Executive Vice Chairman, Central Committee of the All-China Federation of Industry and Commerce	PM	—	—
Liu Peng (born 1951)	刘鹏	∞	Han	Secretary, State General Administration of Sports (2012–2016)	PM		—
Liu Yuan (born 1951)	刘源	§	Han	Political Commissar, General Logistics Department of the People's Liberation Army	Gen.	—	—
Liu He (born 1952)	刘鹤	—	Han	Director, General Office of the Leading Group for Financial and Economic Affairs	PM		—
Liu Yunshan (born 1947)	刘云山	—	Han	President, Central Party School; Chairman, Central Guidance Commission on Building Spiritual Civilization	NL	a smiling, aged man with wavy hair, wearing a suit and a coloured tie	PSC, PB, ST
Liu Yazhou (born 1952)	刘亚洲	§	Han	Political Commissar, PLA National Defence University	Gen.	—	—
Liu Chengjun (born 1949)	刘成军	↔	Han	President, PLA Academy of Military Science (2012–2015)	Gen.	—	—
Liu Weiping (born 1953)	刘伟平	—	Han	Governor of Gansu	PM		—
Liu Yandong (born 1945)	刘延东	♀	Han	Vice Premier, State Council	DNL	a smiling, aged woman, wearing a blue dress (and a black shirt under it), white necklace and standing in front of the American and Chinese national flags	PB
Liu Qibao (born 1953)	刘奇葆	—	Han	Head, Publicity Department	DNL		PB, ST
Liu Xiaojiang (born 1949)	刘晓江	∞	Han	Political Commissar, People's Liberation Army Navy (2012–2015)	Adm.	—	—
Liu Jiayi (born 1955)	刘家义	—	Han	Auditor General of the National Audit Office	PM		—
Liu Yuejun (born 1954)	刘粤军	§	Han	Commander, Lanzhou Military Region	Gen.		—
Liu Fulian (born 1953)	刘福连	§	Han	Political Commissar, Beijing Military Region	Gen.	—	—
Xu Dazhe (born 1956)	许达哲	—	Han	Director, China National Space Administration (2013–2016); Governor of Hunan (2016–2017)	PM		—
Xu Qiliang (born 1950)	许其亮	§	Han	Vice Chairman, Central Military Commission	DNL Gen.		PB, CMC
Xu Yaoyuan (born 1952)	许耀元	§	Han	Political Commissar, PLA Academy of Military Science	Gen.	—	—
Sun Huaishan (born 1957)	孙怀山	♮	Han	Secretary, Party Branch of Organizations Reporting to the Chinese People's Political Consultative Conference	PM	—	—
Sun Jianguo (born 1952)	孙建国	§	Han	Deputy Chief of General Staff, People's Liberation Army	Adm.		—
Sun Chunlan (born 1950)	孙春兰	♀	Han	Secretary, Tianjin Municipal Committee (2012–2014); Head, United Front Work Department (2014–2017)	DNL		PB
Sun Zhengcai (born 1963)	孙政才	♮	Han	Secretary, Chongqing Municipal Committee (2012–2017)	DNL		PB
Sun Sijing (born 1951)	孙思敬	§	Han	Political Commissar, People's Armed Police Force	Gen.	—	—
Su Shulin (born 1962)	苏树林	♮	Han	Governor of Fujian (2012–2015)	PM	—	—
Du Qinglin (born 1946)	杜青林	—	Han	Vice Chairman, National Committee of the Chinese People's Political Consultative Conference	DNL		ST
Du Jincai (born 1952)	杜金才	§	Han	Deputy Secretary, Central Commission for Discipline Inspection; Secretary, Commission for Discipline Inspection of the Central Military Commission	Gen.	—	SC–CCDI, CCDI
Du Hengyan (born 1951)	杜恒岩	§	Han	Political Commissar, Jinan Military Region	Adm.	—	—
Li Wei (born 1953)	李伟	—	Han	Director, Development Research Center of the State Council	PM		—
Li Bin (born 1954)	李斌	♀	Han	Chairwoman, National Health and Family Planning Commission	PM		—
Li Congjun (born 1949)	李从军	∞	Han	President of the Xinhua News Agency (2012–2015)	PM	—	—
Li Dongsheng (born 1955)	李东生	♮	Han	Vice Minister of Public Security (2012–2013); Director of the 6-10 Office (2012–2013)	PM	—	—
Li Liguo (Note: Li was investigated by the Central Commission for Discipline Inspection and assigned leading responsibility for corruption at the Ministry of Civil Affairs; as a result, he lost his Central Committee membership. He was, however, allowed to maintain his party membership on a two-year probationary basis.) (born 1953)	李立国	₪	Han	Minister of Civil Affairs (2012–2016)	PM	—	—
Li Jiheng (born 1957)	李纪恒	—	Han	Governor of Yunnan (2012–2014); Secretary, Yunnan Provincial Committee (2014–2016); Secretary, Inner Mongolia Regional Committee (2016–2017)	PM	—	—
Li Keqiang (born 1955)	李克强	—	Han	Premier, State Council; Chairman, State Commission for Public Sector Reform; Chairman, National Defense Mobilization Commission; Chairman, National Energy Commission; Chairman, Central Institutional Organization Commission	NL	a smiling man with a short haircut, wearing glasses, a white shirt, a suit and a red tie	PSC, PB
Li Xueyong (born 1950)	李学勇	∞	Han	Governor of Jiangsu (2012–2015)	PM	a man with a wavy haircut, wearing glasses, a white shirt, a suit and a black tie with white dots	—
Li Jianhua (born 1954)	李建华	—	Han	Secretary, Ningxia Hui Autonomous Regional Committee (2012–2017)	PM	—	—
Li Jianguo (born 1946)	李建国	—	Han	Vice Chairman, Standing Committee of the National People's Congress	DNL	—	PB
Li Hongzhong (born 1956)	李鸿忠	—	Han	Secretary, Hubei Provincial Committee (2012–2016); Secretary, Tianjin Municipal Committee (2016–2017)	PM	—	—
Li Yuanchao (born 1950)	李源潮	—	Han	Vice President of the People's Republic of China	DNL	a smiling man with a long haircut, wearing a white shirt, a suit and a red tie	PB
Yang Jing (born 1953)	杨晶	—	Mongol	Secretary-General, State Council	DNL	a serious looking man with a long haircut, wearing a white shirt, a suit and a blue tie with white stripes	ST
Yang Chuantang (born 1954)	杨传堂	—	Han	Minister of Transport	PM	—	—
Yang Jinshan (born 1954)	杨金山	♮§	Han	Deputy Commander of the Chengdu Military Region (2012–2013)	Lt. Gen.	—	—
Yang Dongliang (born 1954)	杨栋梁	♮	Han	Director, State Administration of Work Safety (2012–2015)	PM		—
Yang Jiechi (born 1950)	杨洁篪	—	Han	State Councillor	DNL	a smiling man with a cropped haircut, wearing glasses and a blue shirt	—
Yang Huanning (Note: Yang was investigated by the Central Commission for Discipline Inspection and accused of disciplinary failings, and demoted in 2017.) (born 1957)	杨焕宁	₪	Han	Executive Deputy Minister of Public Security (2012–2015); Director, State Administration of Work Safety (2015–2017)	PM	—	—
Xiao Gang (born 1958)	肖钢	—	Han	Chairman, China Securities Regulatory Commission	PM	a man seated, with a wavy haircut, wearing a blue shirt, a suit and a blue tie	—
Xiao Jie (born 1957)	肖捷	—	Han	Deputy Secretary-General, State Council	PM		—
Wu Changde (born 1952)	吴昌德	§	Han	Deputy Director, People's Liberation Army General Political Department	Gen.	—	—
Wu Shengli (born 1945)	吴胜利	§	Han	Commander, People's Liberation Army Navy	Adm.	a man rendering honours (showcased by his left arm), wearing a dark military uniform	CMC
Wu Aiying (born 1951)	吴爱英	♮♀	Han	Minister of Justice (2012–2017)	PM	—	—
Wu Xinxiong (Note: Wu Xinxiong holds a position that is normally considered deputy-minister level. However he was formerly the Governor of Jiangxi and maintained his rank when he transferred to positions in Beijing. His successor Nur Bekri was given similar treatment.) (born 1949)	吴新雄	∞	Han	Director, National Energy Administration (2012–2015)	PM		—
He Yiting (born 1952)	何毅亭	—	Han	Executive Vice President, Central Party School	PM		—
Leng Rong (born 1953)	冷溶	—	Han	Chairman, Central Literature Research Office	—	—	—
Wang Yang (born 1955)	汪洋	—	Han	Vice Premier, State Council	DNL	a man with a wavy haircut, wearing a white shirt, a suit and a blue tie	PB
Wang Yongqing (born 1959)	汪永清	—	Han	Secretary-General, Central Political and Legal Affairs Commission; Deputy Secretary-General, State Council	PM	—	—
Shen Yueyue (born 1957)	沈跃跃	♀	Han	Vice Chair, Standing Committee of the National People's Congress; Chair, Central Committee of the All-China Women's Federation	DNL	—	—
Shen Deyong (born 1954)	沈德咏	—	Han	Executive Vice President, Supreme People's Court	PM	—	—
Song Dahan (born 1952)	宋大涵	—	Han	Director, Legislative Affairs Office of the State Council	PM	—	—
Song Xiuyan (born 1955)	宋秀岩	♀	Han	Secretary, Party Branch of the All-China Women's Federation; First Secretary, Secretariat of the All-China Women's Federation	PM	—	—
Zhang Yang (1951–2017)	张阳	§	Han	Deputy Director, People's Liberation Army General Political Department	Gen.	—	CMC
Zhang Mao (born 1954)	张茅	—	Han	Director, State Administration for Industry and Commerce	PM	—	—
Zhang Yi (born 1950)	张毅	∞	Han	Director, State-owned Assets Supervision and Administration Commission (2012–2017)	PM	—	—
Zhang Youxia (born 1950)	张又侠	§	Han	Director, People's Liberation Army General Armaments Department	Gen.		CMC
Zhang Shibo (born 1952)	张仕波	§	Han	President, PLA National Defence University (2014–); Commander, Beijing Military Region (2012–2014)	Gen.		—
Zhang Qingwei (born 1961)	张庆伟	—	Han	Governor of Hebei	PM	—	—
Zhang Qingli (born 1951)	张庆黎	—	Han	Vice Chairman, National Committee of the Chinese People's Political Consultative Conference; Secretary-General, National Committee of the Chinese People's Political Consultative Conference	DNL	—	—
Zhang Zhijun (born 1953)	张志军	—	Han	Director, Taiwan Affairs Office	PM		—
Zhang Guoqing (born 1964)	张国清	—	Han	Deputy Secretary, Chongqing Municipal Committee (2013–2016); Mayor of Chongqing (2016–)	PM		—
Zhang Baoshun (born 1950)	张宝顺	∞	Han	Secretary, Anhui Provincial Committee (2012–2015)	PM	—	—
Zhang Chunxian (born 1953)	张春贤	—	Han	Secretary, Xinjiang Autonomous Regional Committee	DNL	—	PB
Zhang Gaoli (born 1946)	张高丽	—	Han	Vice Premier, State Council	NL	a seated man with a short haircut, wearing glasses, a white shirt, a suit and a red tie with white dots	PSC, PB
Zhang Haiyang (born 1949)	张海阳	↔	Han	Political Commissar, Second Artillery Corps (2012–2015)	Gen.	—	—
Zhang Yijiong (born 1955)	张裔炯	—	Han	Executive Deputy Head, United Front Work Department	PM	—	—
Zhang Dejiang (born 1946)	张德江	—	Han	Chairman, Standing Committee of the National People's Congress	NL	a serious looking man with a wavy haircut, wearing glasses, a white shirt, a suit and a red tie with white stripes and looking leftwards (away from the camera)	PSC, PB
Lu Hao (born 1967)	陆昊	—	Han	Governor of Heilongjiang	PM	—	—
Chen Xi (born 1953)	陈希	—	Han	Executive Deputy Head, Organization Department	PM	—	—
Chen Lei (born 1954)	陈雷	—	Han	Minister of Water Resources	PM		—
Chen Quanguo (born 1955)	陈全国	—	Han	Secretary, Xinjiang Regional Committee (2016–); Secretary, Tibet Regional Committee (2011–2016)	PM	—	—
Chen Qiufa (born 1954)	陈求发	—	Miao	Chairman of the Hunan People's Political Consultative Conference (2013–2015); Governor of Liaoning (2015–2017)	PM	—	—
Chen Baosheng (born 1956)	陈宝生	—	Han	Vice President, China National School of Administration; Party Secretary, China National School of Administration	PM	—	—
Chen Zhenggao (born 1952)	陈政高	—	Han	Minister of Housing and Urban-Rural Development	PM	—	—
Chen Min'er (born 1960)	陈敏尔	—	Han	Governor of Guizhou (2012–2015); Secretary, Guizhou Provincial Committee (2015–2017); Secretary, Chongqing Municipal Committee (2017)	PM	—	—
Nur Bekri (born 1961)	努尔·白克力	—	Uyghur	Chairman of Xinjiang (2012–2014); Director, National Energy Administration (2015–2017)	PM		—
Miao Wei (born 1955)	苗圩	—	Han	Minister of Industry and Information Technology	PM		—
Fan Changlong (born 1947)	范长龙	§	Han	Vice Chairman, Central Military Commission	DNL Gen.		PB, CMC
Lin Jun (born 1949)	林军	—	Han	President, Central Committee of the All-China Federation of Returned Overseas Chinese	—	—	—
Lin Zuoming (born 1957)	林左鸣	—	Han	Chairman, Board of the Aviation Industry Corporation of China	—	—	—
Shang Fulin (born 1951)	尚福林	∞	Han	President, China Banking Regulatory Commission	PM	—	—
Luo Zhijun (born 1951)	罗志军	∞	Han	Secretary, Jiangsu Provincial Committee (2012–2016)	PM		—
Luo Baoming (born 1952)	罗保铭	∞	Han	Secretary, Hainan Provincial Committee (2012–2017)	PM	—	—
Zhou Ji (born 1946)	周济	—	Han	President, Chinese Academy of Engineering	PM	—	—
Zhou Qiang (born 1960)	周强	—	Han	President, Supreme Court	DNL		—
Zhou Benshun (born 1953)	周本顺	♮	Han	Secretary, Hebei Provincial Committee (2013–2015)	PM	—	—
Zhou Shengxian (born 1949)	周生贤	∞	Han	Minister of Environmental Protection (2012–2015)	PM	a man with a wavy haircut, wearing white shirt, a grey suit and a blue tie	—
Zheng Weiping (born 1955)	郑卫平	§	Han	Political Commissar, Nanjing Military Region	Gen.	—	—
Fang Fenghui (born 1951)	房峰辉	§	Han	Director, People's Liberation Army General Staff Department	Gen.	a man standing at attention, wearing a green military uniform, a light green shirt, a dark green tie and a military cap	CMC
Meng Xuenong (born 1949)	孟学农	—	Han	Chairman, Legal Affairs Committee of the Chinese People's Political Consultative Conference	—	—	—
Meng Jianzhu (born 1947)	孟建柱	—	Han	Secretary, Central Political and Legal Affairs Commission	DNL	a man with a wavy haircut, wearing glasses, a white shirt, a suit and a blue tie	PB
Xiang Junbo (born 1957)	项俊波	♮	Han	Chairman, China Insurance Regulatory Commission	PM	—	—
Zhao Shi (born 1953)	赵实	♀	Han	Secretary, Party Branch of the China Federation of Literary and Art Circles	—	—	—
Zhao Zhengyong (born 1951)	赵正永	∞	Han	Secretary, Shaanxi Provincial Committee (2012–2016)	PM		—
Zhao Leji (born 1957)	赵乐际	—	Han	Head, Organization Department	DNL		PB, ST
Zhao Keshi (born 1947)	赵克石	§	Han	Director, General Logistics Department of the People's Liberation Army	Gen.	—	CMC
Zhao Kezhi (born 1953)	赵克志	—	Han	Secretary, Guizhou Provincial Committee (2012–2015); Secretary, Hebei Provincial Committee (2015–2017)	PM	a man wearing glasses and a white shirt	—
Zhao Zongqi (born 1955)	赵宗岐	§	Han	Commander, Jinan Military Region	Gen.	—	—
Zhao Hongzhu (born 1947)	赵洪祝	—	Han	Deputy Secretary, Central Commission for Discipline Inspection	DNL	—	ST, SC–CCDI, CCDI
Hu Zejun (born 1955)	胡泽君	♀	Han	Executive Deputy Procurator-General, Supreme People's Procuratorate (2012–2017); Auditor General (2017)	PM	—	—
Hu Chunhua (born 1963)	胡春华	—	Han	Secretary, Guangdong Provincial Committee	DNL		PB
Yu Zhengsheng (born 1945)	俞正声	—	Han	Chairman, National Committee of the Chinese People's Political Consultative Conference	NL	a nearly bald man wearing glasses, a white shirt, a suit and a blue tie	PSC, PB
Jiang Daming (born 1953)	姜大明	—	Han	Minister of Land and Resources	PM	—	—
Jiang Yikang (born 1953)	姜异康	∞	Han	Secretary, Shandong Provincial Committee (2012–2017)	PM	—	—
Luo Huining (born 1954)	骆惠宁	—	Han	Governor of Qinghai (2012–2016); Secretary, Shanxi Provincial Committee (2016–2017)	PM		—
Qin Guangrong (born 1954)	秦光荣	∞	Han	Secretary, Yunnan Provincial Committee (2012–2014)	PM		—
Yuan Chunqing (born 1952)	袁纯清	—	Han	Party Secretary of Shanxi (2012–2014)	PM	—	—
Yuan Guiren (born 1950)	袁贵仁	—	Han	Minister of Education (2012–2016)	PM		—
Geng Huichang (born 1951)	耿惠昌	∞	Han	Minister of State Security (2012–2017)	PM	—	—
Nie Weiguo (born 1952)	聂卫国	—	Han	Director, Engineering Oversight Office of the Three Gorges Dam	PM	—	—
Li Zhanshu (born 1950)	栗战书	—	Han	Director, General Office of the Central Committee	DNL	a grumpy looking man looking downwards, wearing white shirt, a suit and a blue tie	PB, ST
Jia Ting'an (born 1952)	贾廷安	§	Han	Deputy Director, People's Liberation Army General Political Department	Gen.	—	—
Xia Baolong (born 1952)	夏宝龙	∞	Han	Secretary, Zhejiang Provincial Committee (2012–2017)	PM		—
Tie Ning (born 1957)	铁凝	♀	Han	President, China Writers Association	—		—
Xu Shousheng (born 1953)	徐守盛	∞	Han	Secretary, Hunan Provincial Committee (2013–2016)	PM	—	—
Xu Shaoshi (born 1951)	徐绍史	∞	Han	Chairman, National Development and Reform Commission (2012–2017)	PM		—
Xu Fenlin (born 1953)	徐粉林	§	Han	Commander, Guangzhou Military Region	Gen.		—
Gao Hucheng (born 1951)	高虎城	∞	Han	Minister of Commerce (2013–2017)	PM		—
Guo Shengkun (born 1954)	郭声琨	—	Han	State Councillor; Minister of Public Security	DNL	a smiling, clearly aged man with wavy haircut, wearing glasses, a white shirt, a suit and a light red tie	—
Guo Jinlong (born 1947)	郭金龙	—	Han	Secretary, Beijing Municipal Committee (2012–2017)	DNL		PB
Guo Gengmao (born 1950)	郭庚茂	∞	Han	Secretary, Henan Provincial Committee (2013–2016)	PM		—
Guo Shuqing (born 1956)	郭树清	—	Han	Governor of Shandong (2013–2017); Chairman, China Banking Regulatory Commission (2017)	PM	a serious looking man bending forwards while seated, wearing glasses, a white shirt, a suit and a purple tie with white dots	—
Huang Xingguo (born 1954)	黄兴国	♮	Han	Mayor of Tianjin (2012–2016)	PM	a man with a wavy haircut, wearing glasses, a white shirt, a suit and a blue tie	—
Huang Qifan (born 1952)	黄奇帆	∞	Han	Mayor of Chongqing (2012–2017)	PM	a visibly aged man bending rightwards, wearing glasses, a white shirt, a suit, a dark blue tie and a communist party membership card	—
Huang Shuxian (born 1954)	黄树贤	—	Han	Deputy Secretary, Central Commission for Discipline Inspection; Minister of Supervision	PM	—	SC–CCDI, CCDI
Cao Jianming (born 1955)	曹建明	—	Han	Procurator-General of the Supreme People's Procuratorate	DNL	—	—
Qi Jianguo (born 1952)	戚建国	§	Han	Deputy Chief of General Staff, People's Liberation Army	Gen.		—
Chang Wanquan (born 1949)	常万全	§	Han	State Councilor; Minister of National Defense	DNL Gen.	a man with a wavy haircut, wearing glasses and a green military uniform with military insignia and badges	CMC
Lu Xinshe (born 1956)	鹿心社	—	Han	Governor of Jiangxi (2012–2016); Secretary, Jiangxi Provincial Committee (2016–2017)	PM	—	—
Peng Yong (born 1954)	彭勇	§	Han	Commander, Xinjiang Military District	Lt. Gen.	—	—
Peng Qinghua (born 1957)	彭清华	—	Han	Secretary, Guangxi Zhuang Autonomous Regional Committee	PM		—
Jiang Dingzhi (born 1954)	蒋定之	—	Han	Governor of Hainan (2012–2015); Vice Chairman, Jiangsu Provincial People's Congress (2015–2017)	PM		—
Jiang Jianguo (born 1956)	蒋建国	—	Han	Director of the State Council Information Office; Deputy Director, Publicity Department	PM		—
Jiang Jiemin (born 1954)	蒋洁敏	♮	Han	Director, State-owned Assets Supervision and Administration Commission (2013)	PM	—	—
Han Zheng (born 1954)	韩正	—	Han	Secretary, Shanghai Municipal Committee	DNL	a smiling man with a short haircut, wearing glasses, a white shirt, a suit and a white tie with blue stripes	PB
Han Changfu (born 1954)	韩长赋	—	Han	Minister of Agriculture	PM	a smiling man with a wavy haircut looking leftwards, wearing glasses, a white shirt, a suit and a blue tie with black dots	—
Jiao Huancheng (born 1949)	焦焕成	∞	Han	Deputy Secretary-General, State Council (2012–2015)	PM	—	—
Xie Fuzhan (born 1954)	谢伏瞻	—	Han	Governor of Henan (2013–2016); Secretary, Henan Provincial Committee (2016–2017)	PM		—
Qiang Wei (born 1953)	强卫	∞	Han	Secretary, Jiangxi Provincial Committee (2013–2016)	PM	—	—
Lou Jiwei (born 1950)	楼继伟	∞	Han	Minister of Finance (2012–2016)	PM		—
Xie Zhenhua (born 1949)	解振华	∞	Han	Deputy Director, National Development and Reform Commission (2012–2015)	PM	a smiling man who is bald, wearing glasses, a white shirt, a suit and a black tie with blue stripes	—
Chu Yimin (born 1953)	褚益民	§	Han	Political Commissar, Shenyang Military Region	Gen.	—	—
Cai Wu (born 1949)	蔡武	∞	Han	Minister of Culture (2012–2014)	PM	a serious looking man with a wavy haircut, wearing glasses, a white shirt, a suit and a red tie with white stripes	—
Cai Mingzhao (born 1955)	蔡名照	—	Han	President, Xinhua News Agency	PM		—
Cai Yingting (born 1954)	蔡英挺	§	Han	Commander, Nanjing Military Region	Gen.		—
Cai Fuchao (born 1951)	蔡赴朝	∞	Han	Chairman, State Administration of Radio, Film, and Television (2012–2016); Deputy Director, Publicity Department	PM		—
Luo Shugang (born 1955)	雒树刚	—	Han	Executive Deputy Head, Propaganda Department (2012–2014); Minister of Culture (2014–2017)	PM		—
Wei Liang (born 1953)	魏亮	§	Han	Political Commissar, Guangzhou Military Region	Gen.	—	—
Wei Fenghe (born 1953)	魏凤和	§	Han	Commander, Second Artillery Corps	Gen.	a smiling man with his mouth open and looking rightwards, wearing a light green military uniform with insignia and badges	CMC

=== Alternates ===
Notes

- The individuals below are listed according to the number of votes in favour received at the Party Congress that elected the committee; if the number of votes in favour they received were the same, they are ordered by the number of strokes in their surnames.
- Name (birth–death), Ethnicity, Office, and Rank can be sorted alphabetical by pressing the button next to the column titles.

Replacement of expelled CC full members

- At each plenum, previously expelled full members of the Central Committee are replaced by alternate members. Alternate members are promoted to full members based on their rank sequence, determined by the number of votes they received at the previous party congress. In October 2017, at the 7th plenum, 11 such replacements were made. However, in a seeming departure from protocol, Liu Xuepu, Zhu Yanfeng, Zheng Qunliang, and Zhao Jin were skipped over from consideration – a possible indication that they had themselves ran afoul of party regulations prior to the plenum.

Name (birth–death)	Hanzi	K	Ethnicity	Office	Rank
Ma Jiantang (born 1958)	马建堂	↑	Han	Director, National Bureau of Statistics	PM
Wang Zuo'an (born 1958)	王作安	↑	Han	Director, State Administration for Religious Affairs	SPM
Mao Wanchun (born 1961)	毛万春	↑	Han	Head, Shaanxi Provincial Organization Department (2013–2016); Deputy Secretary, Shaanxi Provincial Committee (2016–)	SPM
Liu Xiaokai (born 1962)	刘晓凯	↑	Miao	Head, Guizhou United Front Work Department	SPM
Chen Zhirong (1957–2016)	陈志荣	↑	Li	Vice Governor of Hainan	SPM
Jin Zhenji (born 1959)	金振吉	↑	Korean	Vice Governor of Jilin	SPM
Zhao Xiangeng (born 1953)	赵宪庚	↑	Han	Vice President, Chinese Academy of Engineering	SPM
Xian Hui (born 1958)	咸辉	↑♀	Hui	Vice Governor of Gansu (2012–2016); Chairman of Ningxia (2016–)	PM
Mo Jiancheng (born 1956)	莫建成	♮	Han	Deputy Secretary, Jiangxi Provincial Committee; Vice Governor of Jiangxi	SPM
Cui Bo (born 1957)	崔波	↑	Han	Deputy Secretary, Ningxia Hui Autonomous Regional Committee	SPM
Shu Xiaoqin (born 1956)	舒晓琴	↑♀	Han	Director, State Bureau for Letters and Calls; Deputy Secretary-General, State Council	SPM
Ma Shunqing (born 1963)	马顺清	↑	Hui	Chairman, Qinghai Federation of Trade Unions (2015–); Vice Governor of Qinghai (2012–2015)	SPM
Wang Jianjun (born 1958)	王建军	↑	Han	Deputy Secretary, Qinghai Provincial Committee	SPM
Zhu Mingguo (born 1957)	朱明国	♮	Li	Chairman, Guangdong People's Political Consultative Conference (2013–2014); Deputy Secretary, Guangdong Provincial Committee (2012–2013)	PM
Liu Xuepu (born 1957)	刘学普	—	Tujia	Secretary, Chongqing Municipal Political and Legal Affairs Commission	SPM
Li Qiang (born 1959)	李强	↑	Han	Governor of Zhejiang (2012–2016); Secretary, Jiangsu Provincial Committee (2016–2017)	PM
Yang Chongyong (born 1955)	杨崇勇	♮	Manchu	Executive Vice Governor of Hebei	SPM
Yu Yuanhui (born 1964)	余远辉	♮	Yao	Secretary, Nanning Municipal Committee (2013–2015)	SPM
Chen Wu (born 1954)	陈武	↑	Zhuang	Chairman, Guangxi Zhuang Autonomous Region	PM
Chen Mingming (born 1957)	陈鸣明	↑	Bouyei	Vice Governor of Guizhou; Secretary, Qianxinan Buyei and Miao Autonomous Prefecture Committee	SPM
Zhu Yanfeng (born 1961)	竺延风	—	Han	Chairman, Dongfeng Motor; Party Secretary, Dongfeng Motor	—
Zheng Qunliang (born 1954)	郑群良	§	Han	Deputy Commander, PLA Air Force	Lt. Gen.
Zhao Jin (born 1962)	赵金	—	Yi	Head, Yunnan Provincial Propaganda Department	SPM
Zhao Lixiong (born 1956)	赵立雄	↑	Bai	Chairman, Yunnan Ethnic Affairs and Religion Commission (2012–2016); Vice Chairman, Yunnan People's Congress (2016–)	SPM
Zhao Shucong (born 1955)	赵树丛	↑	Han	Director, State Forestry Administration of the People's Republic of China	SPM
Duan Chunhua (born 1959)	段春华	↑	Han	Secretary-General, Tianjin Municipal Committee	SPM
Losang Gyaltsen (born 1957)	洛桑江村	↑	Tibetan	Chairman, Tibet Autonomous Region	PM
Qian Zhimin (born 1960)	钱智民	—	Han	Chief executive, China National Nuclear Corporation	—
Gao Jin (born 1959)	高津	§	Han	President, PLA Academy of Military Science	Lt. Gen.
Gao Guangbin (born 1963)	高广滨	—	Han	Secretary, Changchun Municipal Committee (2012–2015); Executive Vice Governor of Jilin (2015–)	SPM
Liang Guoyang (born 1951)	梁国扬	—	Han	—	—
Shen Yiqin (born 1959)	谌贻琴	♀	Bai	Executive Vice Governor of Guizhou (2012–2015); Deputy Secretary, Guizhou Provincial Committee (2015–2017); Governor of Guizhou (2017–)	PM
Han Yong (born 1956)	韩勇	—	Han	Political Commissar, Xinjiang Production and Construction Corps (2015–); Deputy Secretary, Xinjiang Uyghur Autonomous Regional Committee	SPM
Lan Tianli (born 1962)	蓝天立	—	Zhuang	Vice Chairman, Guangxi Zhuang Autonomous Region	SPM
Zhan Wenlong (born 1955)	詹文龙	—	Han	President, Institute of High Energy Physics	—
Pan Liangshi (born 1956)	潘良时	§	Han	Commander, Beijing Garrison	Lt. Gen.
Ai Husheng (born 1951)	艾虎生	↔	Han	Deputy Commander, Chengdu Military Region (2012–2014)	Lt. Gen.
Danko (born 1962)	旦科	—	Tibetan	Head, Qinghai Provincial United Front Department	SPM
Ren Xuefeng (born 1965)	任学锋	—	Han	Secretary, Guangzhou Municipal Committee	SPM
Liu Sheng (born 1956)	刘胜	§	Han	Deputy Director, People's Liberation Army General Armaments Department	Lt. Gen.
Liu Hui (born 1959)	刘慧	♀	Hui	Deputy Secretary, Ningxia Hui Autonomous Regional Committee; Chairman, Ningxia Hui Autonomous Region	PM
Li Shixiang (born 1958)	李士祥	—	Han	Executive Vice Mayor of Beijing	SPM
Li Baoshan (born 1955)	李宝善	—	Han	Editor-in-chief, People's Daily (2014–); Editor-in-chief, Qiushi (2012–2014)	PM
Li Jiayang (born 1956)	李家洋	—	Han	Deputy Minister of Agriculture; President, Chinese Academy of Agricultural Sciences; Chairman, Genetics Society of China	SPM
Yang Yue (born 1968)	杨岳	—	Han	Secretary, Fuzhou Municipal Committee	SPM
Yang Xuejun (born 1963)	杨学军	§	Han	President, National University of Defense Technology	Lt. Gen.
Zhang Jie (born 1958)	张杰	—	Han	President, Shanghai Jiao Tong University	SPM
Zhang Daili (born 1954)	张岱梨	—	Han	President, Hubei Federation of Trade Unions (2015–); Head, Hebei Provincial United Front Work Department (2012–2015)	SPM
Zhang Jianping (born 1956)	张建平	§	Han	Deputy Commander, PLA Air Force	Lt. Gen.
Chen Chuanping (born 1962)	陈川平	♮	Han	Secretary, Taiyuan Municipal Committee (2012–2014)	SPM
Hao Peng (born 1960)	郝鹏	—	Han	Governor of Qinghai	PM
Ke Zunping (born 1956)	柯尊平	—	Han	Chairman, Standing Committee of Sichuan People's Political Consultative Conference (2015–); Deputy Secretary, Sichuan Provincial Committee (2013–2015); Head, Sichuan Provincial Organization Department (2012–2013)	PM
Lou Qinjian (born 1956)	娄勤俭	—	Han	Governor of Shaanxi; Deputy Secretary, Shaanxi Provincial Committee	PM
Yao Yinliang (born 1956)	姚引良	—	Han	Vice Governor, Shaanxi; Secretary, Yan'an Municipal Committee (2012–2015)	SPM
Xia Jie (born 1960)	夏杰	♀	Hui	Head, Henan Provincial Organization Department	SPM
Xu Songnan (born 1956)	徐松南	—	Han	Secretary, Chongqing Discipline Inspection Commission	SPM
Jiang Weilie (born 1955)	蒋伟烈	§	Han	Deputy Commander, People's Liberation Army Navy	V-Adm.
Wan Lijun (born 1957)	万立骏	—	Han	President, University of Science and Technology of China (2015–)	SPM
Wang Huizhong (born 1956)	王辉忠	—	Han	Deputy Secretary, Zhejiang Provincial Committee; Secretary, Zhejiang Political and Legal Affairs Commission	SPM
Niu Zhizhong (born 1955)	牛志忠	♮§	Han	Chief of Staff, People's Armed Police	Lt. Gen.
Deng Kai (born 1959)	邓凯	—	Han	Deputy Secretary, Henan Provincial Committee	SPM
Ye Hongzhuan (born 1958)	叶红专	—	Tujia	Secretary, Xiangxi Tujia and Miao Autonomous Prefecture Committee	DE
Erkenjan Turahun (born 1964)	尔肯江·吐拉洪	—	Uyghur	Chairman, Xinjiang Federation of Trade Unions	SPM
Liu Yuting (born 1956)	刘玉亭	—	Han	Deputy Director, State Administration for Industry and Commerce	SPM
Liu Shiquan (born 1963)	刘石泉	—	Han	Vice President, China Aerospace Science and Industry Corporation	—
Li Kang (born 1957)	李康	♀	Zhuang	Vice Chairman, Guangxi Zhuang Autonomous Region	SPM
Li Changping (born 1961)	李昌平	—	Tibetan	Chairman, Sichuan Rural Work Commission	SPM
Yang Weize (born 1962)	杨卫泽	♮	Han	Secretary, Nanjing Municipal Committee (2012–2015)	SPM
Chen Zuoning (born 1957)	陈左宁	♀	Han	Vice President, Chinese Academy of Engineering	—
Nurlan Abelmanjen (born 1962)	努尔兰·阿不都满金	—	Kazakh	Chairman, Xinjiang People's Political Consultative Conference	PM
Lin Duo (born 1956)	林铎	—	Han	Secretary, Liaoning Commission for Discipline Inspection (2014–); Secretary, Harbin Municipal Committee (2012–2014)	SPM
Jin Zhuanglong (born 1964)	金壮龙	—	Han	General Manager, Commercial Aircraft Corporation of China	—
Zhao Aiming (born 1961)	赵爱明	♀	Han	Head, Jiangxi Provincial Organization Department	SPM
Qin Yizhi (born 1965)	秦宜智	—	Han	First Secretary, Communist Youth League	PM
Qin Yinhe (born 1951)	秦银河	§	Han	Deputy Director, General Logistics Department of the People's Liberation Army (2012–2014)	Lt. Gen.
Gao Jianguo (born 1954)	高建国	§	Han	Director, Shenyang Military Region Political Department	Lt. Gen.
Guo Jianbo (born 1960)	郭剑波	—	Han	President, China Electric Power Research Institute	—
Huang Kunming (born 1956)	黄坤明	—	Han	Executive Deputy Head, Propaganda Department	PM
Huang Xinchu (born 1957)	黄新初	—	Han	Secretary, Chengdu Municipal Committee	SPM
Cao Shumin (born 1966)	曹淑敏	♀	Han	President, China Academy for Information and Communication Technology	—
Ge Huijun (born 1963)	葛慧君	♀	Han	Head, Zhejiang Provincial Propaganda Department	SPM
Zeng Wei (born 1956)	曾维	—	Han	Secretary, Shenyang Municipal Committee	SPM
Yu Weiguo (born 1955)	于伟国	—	Han	Deputy Secretary, Fujian Provincial Committee (2013–2015); Governor of Fujian (2015–)	SPM
Wang Ning (born 1955)	王宁	§	Han	Deputy Chief of General Staff, People's Liberation Army (2013–2014); Commander, People's Armed Police (2014–)	Gen.
Wang Jun (born 1958)	王军	—	Han	Director, State Administration of Taxation	PM
Wang Jian (born 1954)	王健	§	Han	Deputy Political Commissar, Beijing Military Region	Lt. Gen.
Lü Xiwen (born 1955)	吕锡文	♮♀	Han	Deputy Secretary, Beijing Municipal Committee (2013–2015)	SPM
Ruan Chengfa (born 1957)	阮成发	—	Han	Secretary, Wuhan Municipal Committee	SPM
Li Xi (born 1956)	李希	—	Han	Head, Shanghai Organization Department (2012–2014); Governor of Liaoning (2014–2015); Secretary, Liaoning Provincial Committee (2015–)	PM
Li Qun (born 1962)	李群	—	Han	Secretary, Qingdao Municipal Committee	SPM
Li Yunfeng (born 1957)	李云峰	♮	Han	Executive Vice Governor of Jiangsu	SPM
Li Guoying (born 1964)	李国英	—	Han	Vice Minister of Water Resources (2012–2015); Deputy Secretary, Anhui Provincial Committee (2015–2016); Governor of Anhui (2016–)	SPM
Wu Manqing (born 1965)	吴曼青	—	Han	President, China Academy of Electronics and Information Technology	—
Shen Suli (born 1958)	沈素琍	♀	Han	Head, Anhui United Front Department	SPM
Fan Changmi (born 1955)	范长秘	♮§	Han	Director, Lanzhou Military Region Political Department (2012–2014)	Lt. Gen.
Ouyang Jian (born 1957)	欧阳坚	—	Bai	Deputy Secretary, Gansu Provincial Committee	SPM
Zhao Yupei (born 1954)	赵玉沛	—	Han	President, Peking Union Medical College Hospital	—
Huang Lixin (born 1962)	黄莉新	♀	Han	Secretary, Nanjing Municipal Committee (2015–)	SPM
Gong Ke (born 1955)	龚克	—	Han	President, Nankai University	SPM
Liang Liming (born 1961)	梁黎明	♀	Han	Vice Governor of Zhejiang	SPM
Dao Linyin (born 1959)	刀林荫	♀	Dai	Vice Chairman, Yunnan People's Congress	SPM
Ma Weiming (born 1960)	马伟明	§	Han	Professor, PLA Navy Engineering University	RADM
Wang Min (born 1956)	王敏	♮	Han	Secretary, Jinan Municipal Committee (2012–2014)	—
Wang Wentao (born 1964)	王文涛	—	Han	Secretary, Nanchang Municipal Committee (2012–2015); Secretary, Jinan Municipal Committee (2015–)	SPM
Niu Hongguang (born 1951)	牛红光	§	Han	Deputy Director, People's Liberation Army General Armaments Department	Lt. Gen.
Mao Chaofeng (born 1965)	毛超峰	—	Han	Executive Vice Governor of Hainan (2015–); Secretary, Hainan Political and Legal Affairs Commission (2013–2015)	SPM
Gongpo Tashi (born 1962)	公保扎西	—	Tibetan	Head, Tibet United Front Department	SPM
Zhu Shanlu (born 1953)	朱善璐	—	Han	Secretary, Peking University	SPM
Ren Hongbin (born 1963)	任洪斌	—	Han	Chairman, Sinomach	—
Tang Tao (born 1962)	汤涛	—	Han	Head, Shanxi Organization Department (2012–2015); Vice Minister of Human Resources and Social Security	SPM
Li Jincheng (born 1963)	李金城	—	Han	Vice-president, China Railway Construction Corporation Limited	—
Li Xiansheng (born 1954)	李宪生	—	Han	Deputy Secretary, Hainan Provincial Committee (2012–2014)	SPM
Li Peilin (born 1955)	李培林	—	Han	Vice President, Chinese Academy of Social Sciences	SPM
Wu Zhenglong (born 1964)	吴政隆	—	Han	Secretary, Taiyuan Municipal Committee (2014–)	SPM
Zhang Xiaoming (born 1963)	张晓明	—	Han	Director, Liaison Office of the Central Government in Hong Kong	PM
Zhang Xiwu (born 1958)	张喜武	♮	Han	Deputy Director, State-owned Assets Supervision and Administration Commission	SPM
Zhang Ruimin (born 1949)	张瑞敏	—	Han	Chief executive, Haier	—
Zhang Ruiqing (born 1955)	张瑞清	§	Han	Deputy Political Commissar, People's Armed Police	Lt. Gen.
Shang Yong (born 1957)	尚勇	—	Han	Executive Vice President, China Association for Science and Technology (2015–)	—
Hu Heping (born 1962)	胡和平	—	Han	Deputy Secretary, Shaanxi Provincial Committee	SPM
Ni Yuefeng (born 1964)	倪岳峰	—	Han	Secretary, Fujian Commission for Discipline Inspection	SPM
Yin Fanglong (born 1953)	殷方龙	§	Han	Deputy Director, People's Liberation Army General Political Department	Gen.
Cao Guangjing (born 1964)	曹广晶	—	Han	Vice Governor of Hubei	SPM
Lei Chunmei (born 1959)	雷春美	♀	She	Head, Fujian United Front Department	SPM
Wang Yongchun (born 1960)	王永春	♮	Han	Vice President, China National Petroleum Corporation (2012–2013)	—
Xu Linping (born 1957)	许林平	§	Han	Deputy Commander, Nanjing Military Region	Lt. Gen.
Sun Jinlong (born 1962)	孙金龙	—	Han	Deputy Secretary, Hunan Provincial Committee	SPM
Jin Donghan (born 1961)	金东寒	—	Han	Lead Engineer, China Shipbuilding Industry Corporation	—
He Fuchu (born 1962)	贺福初	§	Han	President, Military Medicine Academy	Maj. Gen.
Xia Deren (born 1955)	夏德仁	—	Han	Chairman, Liaoning People's Political Consultative Conference	PM
E Jingping (born 1956)	鄂竟平	—	Han	Director, Office of the South-North Water Transfer Project	PM
Jiang Chaoliang (born 1957)	蒋超良	—	Han	Governor of Jilin (2015–); Chairman, Agricultural Bank of China (2012–2014)	—
Ma Zhengqi (born 1959)	马正其	—	Han	Deputy Director, State Administration for Industry and Commerce	SPM
Shi Taifeng (born 1956)	石泰峰	—	Han	Secretary, Suzhou Municipal Committee (2012–2015); Deputy Secretary, Jiangsu Provincial Committee (2012–2015); Governor of Jiangsu (2015–2017); Secretary, Ningxia Regional Committee (2017–)	PM
Li Yumei (born 1956)	李玉妹	♀	Han	Head, Guangdong Organization Department	SPM
Yang Hui (born 1963)	杨晖	§	Han	Chief of Staff, Nanjing Military Region	Lt. Gen.
Wu Changhai (born 1954)	吴长海	§	Han	Deputy Political Commissar, Nanjing Military Region	Lt. Gen.
Song Liping (born 1962)	宋丽萍	♀	Han	President and CEO, Shenzhen Stock Exchange	—
Zhang Yesui (born 1953)	张业遂	—	Han	Secretary, Party Committee of the Ministry of Foreign Affairs; Vice Minister of Foreign Affairs	PM
Chen Run'er (born 1957)	陈润儿	—	Han	Governor of Henan (2016–); Deputy Secretary, Heilongjiang Provincial Committee (2014–2016)	PM
Jiang Jianqing (born 1953)	姜建清	—	Han	Chairman, Industrial and Commercial Bank of China	—
Mei Kebao (born 1957)	梅克保	—	Han	Deputy Director, General Administration of Quality Supervision, Inspection and Quarantine	SPM
Pan Yiyang (born 1961)	潘逸阳	♮	Han	Executive Vice Chairman, Inner Mongolia (2012–2014)	SPM
Ding Xuexiang (born 1962)	丁薛祥	—	Han	Deputy Director, General Office of the Communist Party; Chief of Staff to the General Secretary	SPM
Ulan (born 1962)	乌兰	♀	Mongolian	Deputy Secretary, Hunan Provincial Committee (2016–); Head, Inner Mongolia Propaganda Department (2012–2016)	SPM
Sun Shougang (born 1965)	孙守刚	—	Han	Head, Shandong Propaganda Department	SPM
Li Jia (born 1961)	李佳	—	Han	Deputy Secretary, Inner Mongolia Autonomous Regional Committee	SPM
Zhao Yong (born 1963)	赵勇	—	Han	Deputy Secretary, Hebei Provincial Committee	SPM
Xu Lejiang (born 1959)	徐乐江	—	Han	Chairman, Baosteel Group	—
Cao Qing (born 1952)	曹清	§	Han	Deputy Commander, Beijing Military Region (2015–); Director, Central Guard Bureau (2012–2015)	Lt. Gen.
Cai Zhenhua (born 1961)	蔡振华	—	Han	Director, State General Administration of Sports; President, Chinese Football Association	PM
Wan Qingliang (born 1964)	万庆良	♮	Han	Secretary, Guangzhou Municipal Committee (2012–2014)	SPM
Yin Li (born 1962)	尹力	—	Han	Deputy Secretary, Sichuan Provincial Committee (2015–2016); Governor of Sichuan (2016–)	SPM
Du Jiahao (born 1955)	杜家毫	—	Han	Governor of Hunan (2013–2016); Secretary, Hunan Provincial Committee (2016-)	PM
Li Chuncheng (born 1956)	李春城	♮	Han	Deputy Secretary, Sichuan Provincial Committee (2012)	SPM
He Lifeng (born 1955)	何立峰	—	Han	Deputy Director, National Development and Reform Commission	PM
Chen Gang (born 1966)	陈刚	—	Han	Vice Mayor of Beijing	SPM
Wang Rong (born 1958)	王荣	—	Han	Secretary, Shenzhen Municipal Committee (2012–2015); Chairman, Guangdong People's Political Consultative Conference (2015–)	PM
Ji Lin (born 1962)	吉林	—	Han	Chairman, Beijing People's Political Consultative Conference	PM
Liu Jian (born 1970)	刘剑	—	Han	Secretary, Hami Prefecture Committee	DE
Li Bing (born 1949)	李冰	—	Han	Vice President, China Writers Association	—
Zhang Xuan (born 1958)	张轩	♀	Han	Chairman, Chongqing People's Congress	PM
Hu Xiaolian (born 1958)	胡晓炼	♀	Han	Deputy Governor, People's Bank of China	SPM
Guo Mingyi (born 1958)	郭明义	—	Han	Vice Chairman, All-China Federation of Trade Unions	SPM
Wang Xiaochu (born 1958)	王晓初	—	Han	Chairman, China Telecom	—
Jiang Xiaojuan (born 1957)	江小涓	♀	Han	Deputy Secretary-General, State Council	SPM
Wang Hongzhang (born 1954)	王洪章	—	Han	Chairman, China Construction Bank	—
Hu Huaibang (born 1955)	胡怀邦	—	Han	Chairman, China Development Bank	—
Yi Xiaoguang (born 1958)	乙晓光	§	Han	Deputy Chief of General Staff, People's Liberation Army	Lt. Gen.
Qiu He (born 1957)	仇和	♮	Han	Deputy Secretary, Yunnan Provincial Committee (2012–2015)	SPM
Li Xiaopeng (born 1959)	李小鹏	—	Han	Governor of Shanxi (2013–2016); Minister of Transport (2016–)	PM

== See also ==
- Provincial Party Standing Committee
