= Guo Puxiao =

Chinese air force general (born 1964)

- 郭普校

14th Political Commissar of the People's Liberation Army Air Force
- In office January 2022 – June 2026
- Commander: Chang Dingqiu
- Preceded by: Yu Zhongfu
- Succeeded by: Vacant

Political Commissar of Logistic Support Department of the Central Military Commission
- In office December 2019 – January 2022
- Preceded by: Zhang Guoshu
- Succeeded by: Zhang Lin

Personal details
- Born: January 1964 (age 62) Yao County, Shaanxi, China
- Party: Chinese Communist Party
- Occupation: Military officer

Military service
- Allegiance: People's Republic of China
- Branch/service: People's Liberation Army Air Force
- Years of service: 1981–present
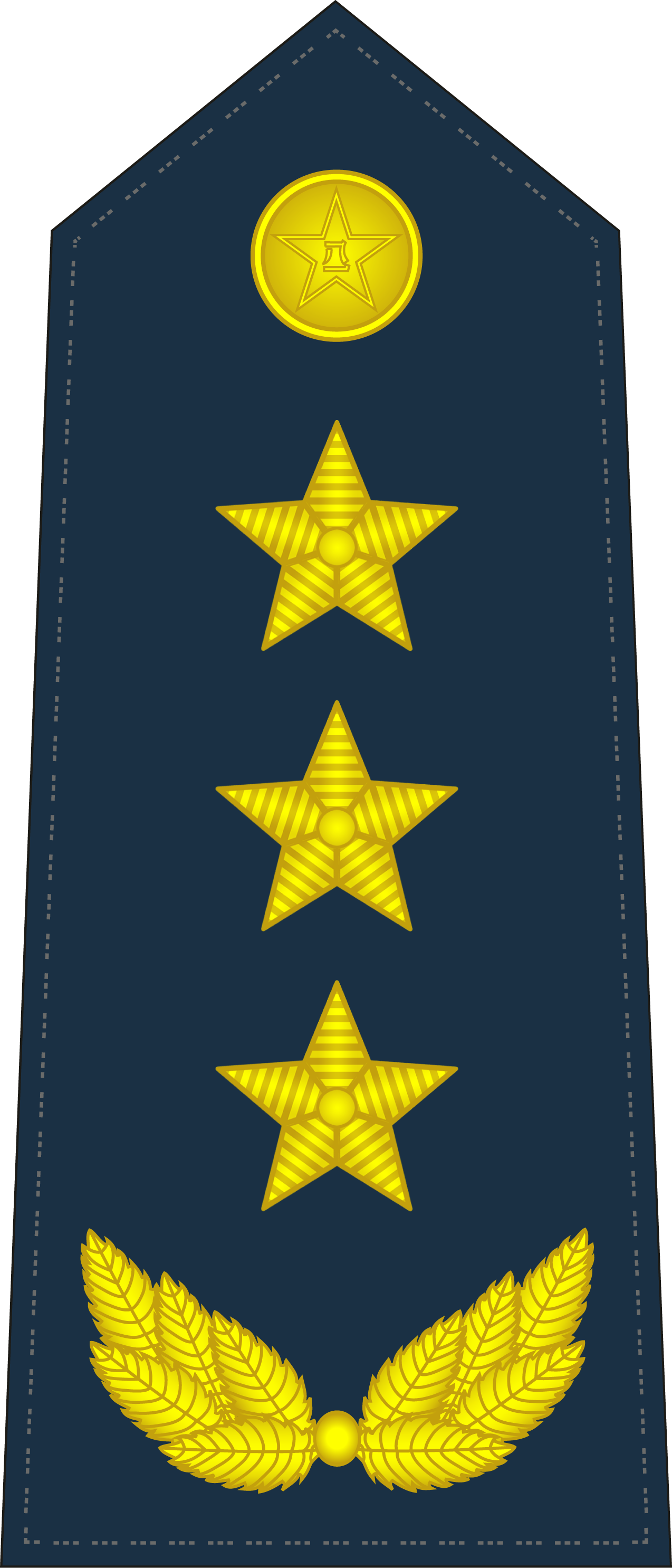
- Rank: Air Force General

Guo Puxiao (Chinese: 郭普校; pinyin: Guō Pǔxiào; born January 1964) is a general (Shangjiang) of the People's Liberation Army (PLA) of China and the political commissar of the People's Liberation Army Air Force (PLAAF) since January 2022. He previously served as the political commissar of Logistic Support Department of the Central Military Commission from 2019 to 2022.

== Biography ==
Guo was born in Yao County, Shaanxi, in January 1964 and entered into service in the PLA in 1981. He served in the PLA Air Force for a long time. In 2014 he became political commissar of the People's Liberation Army Air Force Airborne Corps. In 2017, he succeeded Liu Shaoliang as deputy political commissar of the Central Theater Command and political commissar of the Central Theater Command Air Force. In December 2019, he was appointed political commissar of the CMC Logistic Support Department, replacing Zhang Guoshu.

He was promoted to the rank of lieutenant general (zhongjiang) in July 2018 and general (Shangjiang) in December 2020.

On 26 June 2026, the Standing Committee of the National People's Congress removed Guo as a delegate to the 14th National People's Congress.

Military offices
Preceded by Fan Xiaojun	Political Commissar of the 15th Army of the PLA Air Force Airborne Corps; 2014–2017	Succeeded by Wang Chengnan
Preceded by Liu Shaoliang	Political Commissar of the Central Theater Command Air Force; 2017–2019	Succeeded by Wang Chengnan
Preceded by Zhang Guoshu	Political Commissar of Logistic Support Department of the Central Military Commission; 2019	Succeeded by Zhang Lin
Preceded by Yu Zhongfu	Political Commissar of the People's Liberation Army Air Force; 2022–present	Vacant
