= Fan Xiaojun =

Chinese lieutenant general

- 范骁骏

Political Commissar of the Northern Theater Command
- In office April 2017 – January 2022
- Preceded by: Chu Yimin
- Succeeded by: Liu Qingsong

Political Commissar of the Jinan Military Region Air Force
- In office July 2014 – July 2015
- Preceded by: Yu Zhongfu
- Succeeded by: Bai Wenqi

Personal details
- Born: 1956 (age 69–70) Danyang, Jiangsu
- Party: Chinese Communist Party

Military service
- Allegiance: China
- Branch/service: People's Liberation Army Air Force
- Years of service: ?−2022
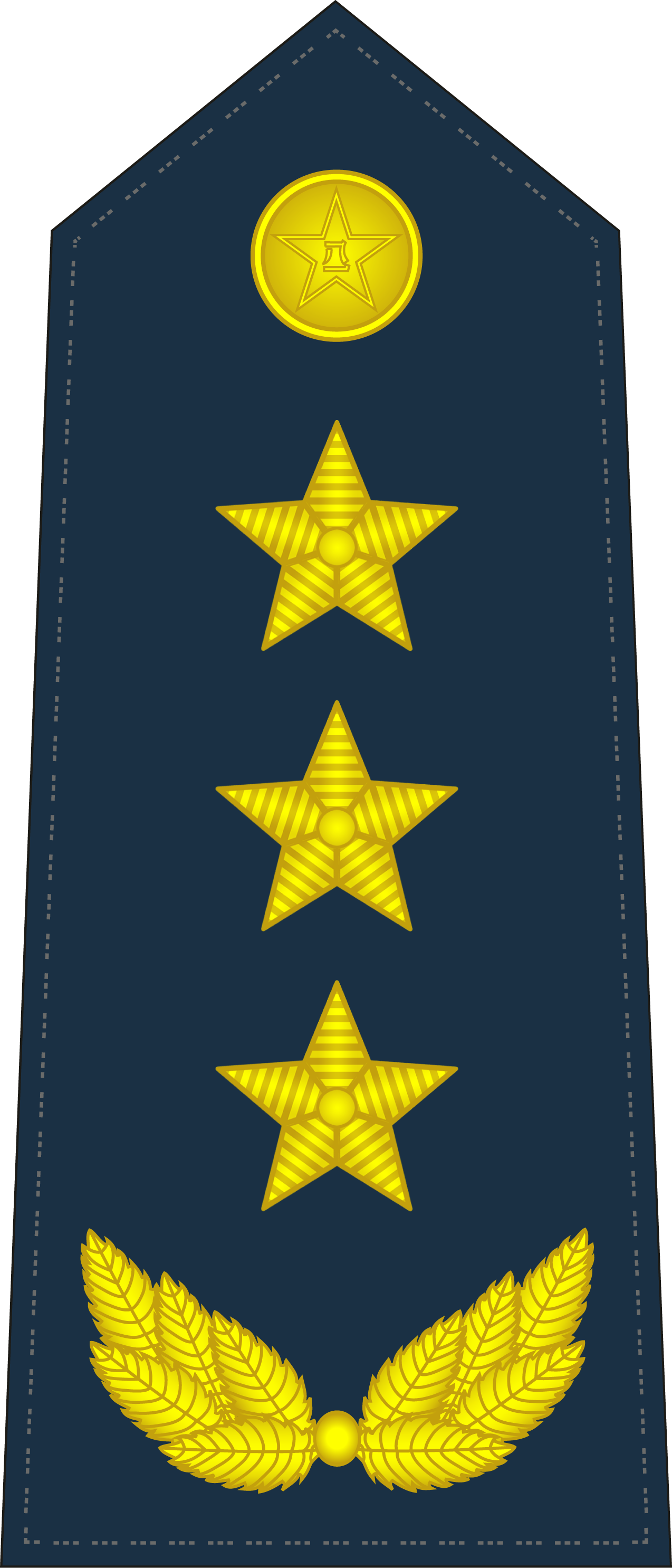
- Rank: Air Force General

Fan Xiaojun (Chinese: 范骁骏; born 1956) is a general of the Chinese People's Liberation Army Air Force (PLAAF). He had been Political Commissar of the Northern Theater Command since April 2017, and formerly served as Director of the Political Department of the PLAAF.

== Biography ==
Fan Xiaojun was born in 1956 in Danyang, Jiangsu. He spent his early career in the Chengdu Military Region and the PLA General Political Department before transferring to the PLAAF.

From 2005, Fan served in the Political Department of the Beijing Military Region Air Force and the Guangzhou Military Region Air Force. In 2009, he became Political Commissar of the PLAAF's 15th Airborne Corps, China's only corps-level airborne force.

In the summer of 2014, he succeeded Lt. Gen. Yu Zhongfu as Political Commissar of the Jinan Military Region Air Force, and concurrently Deputy Political Commissar of the Jinan MR. A year later, he replaced Lt. Gen. Fang Jianguo as Director of the Political Department of the PLAAF, and was promoted to the rank of lieutenant general. In April 2017, he was appointed Political Commissar of the Northern Theater Command, succeeding Gen. Chu Yimin to become the first military-region level political commander from the Air Force.

In October 2017, he was elected as a member of the 19th Central Committee of the Chinese Communist Party.

Military offices
Preceded by Zhao Yiliang	Political Commissar of the 15th Airborne Corps; 2008–2014	Succeeded by Guo Puxiao
Preceded by Yu Zhongfu	Political Commissar of the Jinan Military Region Air Force; 2014–2015	Succeeded by Bai Wenqi
Preceded by Fang Jianguo	Director of the Political Department of the PLAAF; 2015–2017	Succeeded by Du Yuanfang
Preceded by Chu Yimin	Political Commissar of the Northern Theater Command; 2017–2022	Succeeded by Liu Qingsong
