= Deng Changyou =

Chinese retired general

Air Force General Deng Changyou
- 邓昌友

11th Political Commissar of the PLA Air Force
- In office May 2002 – October 2012
- Preceded by: Qiao Qingchen
- Succeeded by: Tian Xiusi

Personal details
- Born: February 1947 (age 79) Pengxi, Sichuan, China
- Party: Chinese Communist Party

Military service
- Allegiance: China
- Branch/service: People's Liberation Army Air Force
- Years of service: 1968–2012
- Rank: Air Force General

Deng Changyou (Chinese: 邓昌友; born February 1947) is a retired general of the People's Liberation Army Air Force (PLAAF) of China. He served as political commissar of the PLAAF.

== Biography ==
Born in Pengxi, Sichuan Province, Deng joined the PLA in March 1968, and the Chinese Communist Party in May 1970. In June 1990, he was appointed the director of the political department of the Air Force Ürümqi headquarters. In January 1993, he became the political commissar of the Air Force 9th corps. In July 1996, he was promoted to vice political commissar and secretary of discipline commission of the Lanzhou Military Region. In March 1997, he became the vice director of the political department of the PLA Air Force, and was promoted to director in November of the same year. In May 2002, he was promoted to political commissar of the PLA Air Force. He was a member of the 16th and 17th Central Committees of the Chinese Communist Party.
