= Wang Jianping =

Former general of the People's Liberation Army

- 王建平

Deputy Chief of the Joint Staff Department of the Central Military Commission
- In office December 2015 – August 2016
- Preceded by: New title
- Succeeded by: Ma Yiming

Deputy Chief of the People's Liberation Army General Staff Department
- In office December 2014 – January 2016
- Preceded by: Wang Ning
- Succeeded by: Position revoked

Commander of the People's Armed Police
- In office December 2009 – December 2014
- Preceded by: Wu Shuangzhan
- Succeeded by: Wang Ning

Chief of Staff of the People's Armed Police
- In office August 2006 – June 2009
- Preceded by: Huo Yi
- Succeeded by: Niu Zhizhong

Personal details
- Born: December 1953 (age 72) Fushun, Liaoning, China
- Party: Chinese Communist Party (expelled)

Military service
- Allegiance: People's Republic of China
- Branch/service: People's Liberation Army Ground Force
- Years of service: 1969–2017
- Rank: General

Wang Jianping (Chinese: 王建平; born December 1953) is a former general of the People's Liberation Army (PLA) of China. He served as commander of the People's Armed Police and deputy chief of General Staff of the People's Liberation Army. He was dismissed in 2016 and placed under investigation for corruption. He was a member of the 18th Central Committee of the Chinese Communist Party.

== Biography ==
Wang traces his ancestry to Zanhuang County, Hebei; he was born in Fushun, Liaoning province. He joined the military in 1969, and served on the artillery force of the 40th Group Army. In 1992 he became commander of the 120th Division of the 40th Group Army. Thereafter he entered the mechanical division of the People's Armed Police (PAP). In 1996, he became head of the Tibet People's Armed Police contingent, then became deputy commander of the People's Armed Police in June 2009 and was named commander of People's Armed Police in June 2012. In December 2014 he was transferred back to the PLA to become deputy chief of joint staff. In January 2015 Wang became deputy head of a coordinating group on military training.

After comprehensive reforms to the People's Liberation Army in 2015, Wang was named Deputy Chief of the Joint Staff Department. In August 2016, the South China Morning Post reported that Wang had been arrested to face charges in connection to the Zhou Yongkang case. Wang was not present at the Sixth Plenum of the 18th Central Committee held in October 2016, further confirming rumours that he was in trouble. On 29 December 2016, the Ministry of National Defense confirmed that he had been placed under investigation for bribery.

Wang was initially an alternate member of the 17th Central Committee of the Chinese Communist Party, ranked 4th out of 167 alternate members. He was made a full member upon the expulsion of Bo Xilai in 2012. He was a full member of the 18th Central Committee of the Chinese Communist Party until his own expulsion at the Seventh Plenum in October 2017.

Military offices
Preceded by Huo Yi	Chief of Staff of the People's Armed Police; 2006–2009	Succeeded by Niu Zhizhong
Preceded by Wu Shuangzhan	Commander of the People's Armed Police; 2009–2014	Succeeded by Wang Ning
Preceded by Wang Ning	Deputy Chief of the People's Liberation Army General Staff Department; 2014–2016	Succeeded by Position revoked
New title	Deputy Chief of the Joint Staff Department of the Central Military Commission; 2015–2016	Succeeded by Ma Yiming
