= Cao Guangjing =

Chinese business executive and politician

- 曹广晶

Vice Governor of Hubei
- In office 29 May 2014 – 24 February 2022
- Governor: Wang Guosheng; Wang Xiaodong; Wang Zhonglin

Chairman of the China Three Gorges Corporation
- In office January 2010 – March 2014
- Preceded by: New title
- Succeeded by: Lu Chun

Personal details
- Born: March 1964 (age 62) Zouping County, Shandong, China
- Party: Chinese Communist Party (expelled; 1991–2022)
- Education: Hohai University; Durham University Business School; Tianjin University

Chinese name
- Simplified Chinese: 曹广晶
- Traditional Chinese: 曹廣晶
Transcriptions
Standard Mandarin
- Hanyu Pinyin: Cáo Guǎngjīng

Cao Guangjing (Chinese: 曹广晶; born March 1964) is a Chinese business executive and politician. He was investigated by China's top anti-graft agency in February 2022. Previously he served as vice governor of Hubei. He was an alternate of the 18th Central Committee of the Chinese Communist Party.

== Biography ==
Cao was born in the town of Mingji Zouping County, Shandong, in March 1964. He received his bachelor's degree and master's degree from Hohai University in 1985 and 1990, respectively.

After university, he served in various posts in the Preparation Office of China Three Gorges Corporation before serving as chairman in January 2010.

In May 2014, he was promoted to become vice governor of Hubei, a position he held until February 2022.

=== Downfall ===
On 24 February 2022, Cao has been placed under investigation for "serious violations of discipline and laws" by the Central Commission for Discipline Inspection (CCDI), the party's internal disciplinary body, and the National Supervisory Commission, the highest anti-corruption agency of China. On November 5, he was arrested for suspected bribe taking by the Supreme People's Procuratorate.

On 24 May 2024, Cao was sentenced to life in prison for bribery and leaking information plus a fine of 12 million yuan ($1.66 million). He was deprived of political rights for life and all his properties were also confiscated.

Business positions
New title	Chairman of the China Three Gorges Corporation; 2010–2014	Succeeded by Lu Chun (卢纯)
