= Chu Yimin =

Chinese military officer

- 褚益民

Political Commissar of the Northern Theater Command
- In office February 2016 – April 2017
- Preceded by: New office
- Succeeded by: Fan Xiaojun

Political Commissar of Shenyang Military Region
- In office December 2010 – February 2016
- Preceded by: Huang Xianzhong
- Succeeded by: Position abolished

Personal details
- Born: July 1953 (age 72) Rugao, Jiangsu
- Party: Chinese Communist Party

Military service
- Allegiance: People's Republic of China
- Branch/service: People's Liberation Army Ground Force
- Years of service: 1969–2017
- Rank: General

Chu Yimin (Chinese: 褚益民; pinyin: Chǔ Yìmín; born July 1953) is a retired general of the Chinese People's Liberation Army (PLA). He was the inaugural Political Commissar of the Northern Theater Command, and previously served as Political Commissar of the Shenyang Military Region.

== Biography ==
Chu Yimin was born in July 1953 in Rugao, Jiangsu. He joined the PLA in 1969, and the Chinese Communist Party in December 1972. He formerly served in the Xinjiang Military District and Nanjing Military Region, and became Political Commissar of the Shenyang Military Region in 2010. He attained the rank of major general in July 2003, lieutenant general (zhong jiang) in July 2008, and full general in July 2014.

Chu was an alternate of the 17th Central Committee of the Chinese Communist Party (2007−12), and a full member of the 18th Central Committee.

Military offices
| Preceded by Li Taizhong | Director of the Political Department of the 21st Group Army; 2002–2003 | Succeeded by Fan Changmi |
| Preceded by Wang Jianmin | Director of the Political Department of the Xinjiang Military District; 2003–2005 | Succeeded by Fan Changmi |
| Preceded by Luo Zhengping | Political Commissar of the 47th Group Army; 2005–2006 | Succeeded by Fan Changmi |
| Preceded by Li Changcai | Director of the Political Department of the Nanjing Military Region; 2006–2010 | Succeeded by Wu Changhai |
| Preceded by Huang Xianzhong | Political Commissar of the Shenyang Military Region; 2010–2016 | Succeeded by Position revoked |
| New title | Political Commissar of the Northern Theater Command; 2016–2017 | Succeeded by Fan Xiaojun |
