= Yi Junqing =

Chinese politician

Yi Junqing 衣俊卿

Director of the Compilation and Translation Bureau of the Central Committee
- In office February 2010 – January 2013
- Preceded by: Wei Jianhua
- Succeeded by: Jia Gaojian

Director of the Heilongjiang Provincial Party Propaganda Department
- In office March 2007 – February 2010

Personal details
- Born: January 1958 (age 68) Donggang, Liaoning
- Party: Chinese Communist Party
- Education: University of Belgrade
- Occupation: Politician
- Profession: Philosophy

Yi Junqing (Chinese: 衣俊卿; pinyin: Yī Jùnqīng; born January 1958) is a former Chinese politician. Born in Liaoning province, Yi served as the propaganda chief of the Heilongjiang party organization between 2007 and 2010. In 2010 he was transferred to Beijing to head the Compilation and Translation Bureau of the Central Committee. In January 2013, he was investigated by the party's anti-corruption body and subsequently dismissed from his positions.

== Biography ==
Yi was born in Donggang, Liaoning in January 1958. He became involved in politics in July 1976 and he joined the Chinese Communist Party in February 1978.

Yi Junqing received his doctor of philosophy degree from the University of Belgrade in the former Yugoslavia.

In March 2007, Yi Junqing was appointed as the Director of the Propaganda Department of the Heilongjiang party organization, a position he held until February 2010. A month later, he was elected as a member of the Heilongjiang Provincial Party Standing Committee, joining the elite political ranks of the province.

In February 2010, he was promoted to become the Director of Compilation and Translation Bureau, an organization under the Central Committee of the Chinese Communist Party. While working at the Compilation and Translation Bureau, Yi was said to have played a major role in developing the Confidence doctrine, which later became a major slogan following the 18th Party Congress.

On January 17, 2013, Yi Junqing was dismissed from his position for his lifestyle by the Central Commission for Discipline Inspection.

== Personal life ==
Yi Junqing had a mistress, Chang Yan (常艳), who was a post-doctoral researcher in Compilation and Translation Bureau of the Central Committee. They slept together in hotels 17 times, and Chang Yan published a detailed account of their affair later. The extramarital relationship was cited as one of the lifestyle issues that led to Yi's discipline by the Central Commission for Discipline Inspection.
