= Li Congjun =

Chinese politician

Li Congjun (Chinese: 李从军; born October 1949) is the former President of China's Xinhua News Agency. He retired in December 2014 and was replaced by Cai Mingzhao.

== Biography ==
Li was born in Liu'an, Anhui Province. He started working in October 1968, and joined the Chinese Communist Party (CCP) in May 1983. In 1985, he obtained a doctorate in literature from the department of Chinese literature of Shandong University.

He became a standing committee member of the CCP Zhejiang committee and the director of the CCP Publicity Department of Zhejiang in January 1999. He became vice director of the CCP Central Publicity Department in February 2001. In August 2007, he was appointed to the position of CCP committee secretary and vice president of Xinhua News Agency, and in March 2008 was promoted to president of that agency.

He is a member of the 17th and 18th Central Committee of the Chinese Communist Party. He is also a member of the education, science, culture and health committee of the National People's Congress.
