= Tian Xiusi =

Chinese general

- 田修思

12th Political Commissar of the PLA Air Force
- In office October 2012 – July 2015
- Preceded by: Deng Changyou
- Succeeded by: Yu Zhongfu

Political Commissar of the Chengdu Military Region
- In office December 2009 – October 2012
- Preceded by: Zhang Haiyang
- Succeeded by: Zhu Fuxi

Political Commissar of the Xinjiang Military District
- In office December 2004 – December 2009
- Preceded by: Yu Linxiang
- Succeeded by: Wang Jianmin

Personal details
- Born: February 1950 (age 76) Mengzhou, Henan, China
- Party: Chinese Communist Party (expelled)

Military service
- Allegiance: China
- Branch/service: People's Liberation Army Air Force
- Years of service: 1968–2015
- Rank: General
- Battles/wars: Battle of Laoshan

Tian Xiusi (Chinese: 田修思; born February 1950) is a retired Chinese general who served as Political Commissar of the People's Liberation Army Air Force. Previously, he was a standing committee member of the Chinese Communist Party Xinjiang committee and the political commissar of the Xinjiang Military District, as well as political commissar of the Chengdu Military Region. In July 2016, Tian was placed under investigation for "serious violations of discipline".

== Biography ==
Tian was born in Dongshuiyun Village, Houcun Town, Mengzhou, Henan Province. He joined the Chinese People's Liberation Army in 1968 and served in Xinjiang for more than three decades. He attained the rank of lieutenant general in July 2006, and general in July 2012. A veteran of the 1984 Battle of Laoshan of the Sino-Vietnamese conflicts, Tian was one of the few Chinese generals of his generation with actual battle experience. He succeeded General Zhang Haiyang as political commissar of the Chengdu Military Region in 2009. In 2012, he replaced and General Deng Changyou as the 12th political commissar of the People's Liberation Army Air Force, even though he had never served in the Air Force.

Tian retired from active service in July 2015, after having reached the age of 65. He was replaced by Lt. General Yu Zhongfu. After retiring from military service, he was named a deputy chair of the National People's Congress Foreign Affairs Committee in August 2015.

Tian was a member of the 17th and 18th Central Committees of the Chinese Communist Party.
