= Zhao Keshi =

Chinese general

- 赵克石

Director of the Logistic Support Department of the Central Military Commission
- In office 2012–2017
- Preceded by: Liao Xilong
- Succeeded by: Song Puxuan

Commander of Nanjing Military Region
- In office 2007–2012
- Preceded by: Zhu Wenquan
- Succeeded by: Cai Yingting

Personal details
- Born: November 1947 (age 78) Gaoyang County, Hebei, China
- Party: Communist Party of China

Zhao Keshi (simplified Chinese: 赵克石; traditional Chinese: 趙克石; pinyin: Zhào Kèshí; born November 1947) is a retired general in the Chinese People's Liberation Army. He is originally from Gaoyang County in Hebei province. He has been director of the Logistic Support Department since 2012. He formerly served as commander of the Nanjing Military Region from 2007 to 2012.

== Biography ==
Zhao joined the army in 1968. He has held several positions, including the head of training for the Nanjing Military Region, the chief of staff for the 31st army group, commander for the 31st army group, deputy chief of staff for the Nanjing Military Region, chief of staff for the Nanjing Military Region, commander for the Nanjing Military Region. He became the commander of the 31st army group in 2000. In June 2004, he became the chief of staff and deputy commander for the Nanjing Military Region. He was elevated to his present rank of lieutenant general the next year, and took up his post as commander of the Nanjing Military Region in 2007. In 2012, he was made director of Logistic Support Department. He was promoted to full general (shang jiang) on July 20, 2010. He has been a member of the 17th Central Committee of the Communist Party of China as well as the 18th Central Committee.
