= Zhu Wenquan =

- 朱文泉

Commander of the Nanjing Military Region
- In office October 2002 – June 2007
- Preceded by: Liang Guanglie
- Succeeded by: Zhao Keshi

Chief of Staff of the Nanjing Military Region
- In office April 1999 – November 2002
- Preceded by: Huang Xinsheng
- Succeeded by: Xu Chengyun

Personal details
- Born: October 1942 (age 83–84) Xiangshui County, Jiangsu, China
- Party: Chinese Communist Party
- Education: PLA Military Academy; Central Party School of the Chinese Communist Party

Military service
- Allegiance: People's Republic of China
- Branch/service: People's Liberation Army Ground Force
- Years of service: 1961–present
- Rank: General

Zhu Wenquan (Chinese: 朱文泉; pinyin: Zhū Wénquán; born October 1942) is a general (shangjiang) of the People's Liberation Army (PLA). He was an alternate of the 16th Central Committee of the Chinese Communist Party. He was a delegate to the 9th National People's Congress and a member of the Standing Committee of the 11th National People's Congress.

== Biography ==
Zhu was born in Xiangshui County, Jiangsu, in October 1942. He enlisted in the People's Liberation Army (PLA) in August 1961, and joined the Chinese Communist Party (CCP) in May 1964. In August 1982, he graduated from the PLA Military Academy. He served in the Jinan Military Region for a long time. In February 1994, he was transferred to the Nanjing Military Region and appointed commander of the 1st Group Army. From August to September 1998, he led soldiers to fight the floods in Jiujiang, Jiangxi and block the breach of the Yangtze River. He became chief of staff of the Nanjing Military Region in April 1999, and served until October 2002, when he was promoted to commander.

He was promoted to the rank of major general (shaojiang) in February 1994, lieutenant general (zhongjiang) in July 2000 and general (shangjiang) in June 2006.

== Publication ==
- 岛屿战争论 [Island War Theory] (in Chinese). Beijing: Military Science Press. 2014. ISBN 9787802376946.

Military offices
Preceded by Huang Xinsheng	Chief of Staff of the Nanjing Military Region; 1999–2002	Succeeded by Xu Chengyun
Preceded by Liang Guanglie	Commander of the Nanjing Military Region; 2002–2007	Succeeded by Zhao Keshi
