= Jiang Jianguo =

Chinese politician

- 蒋建国
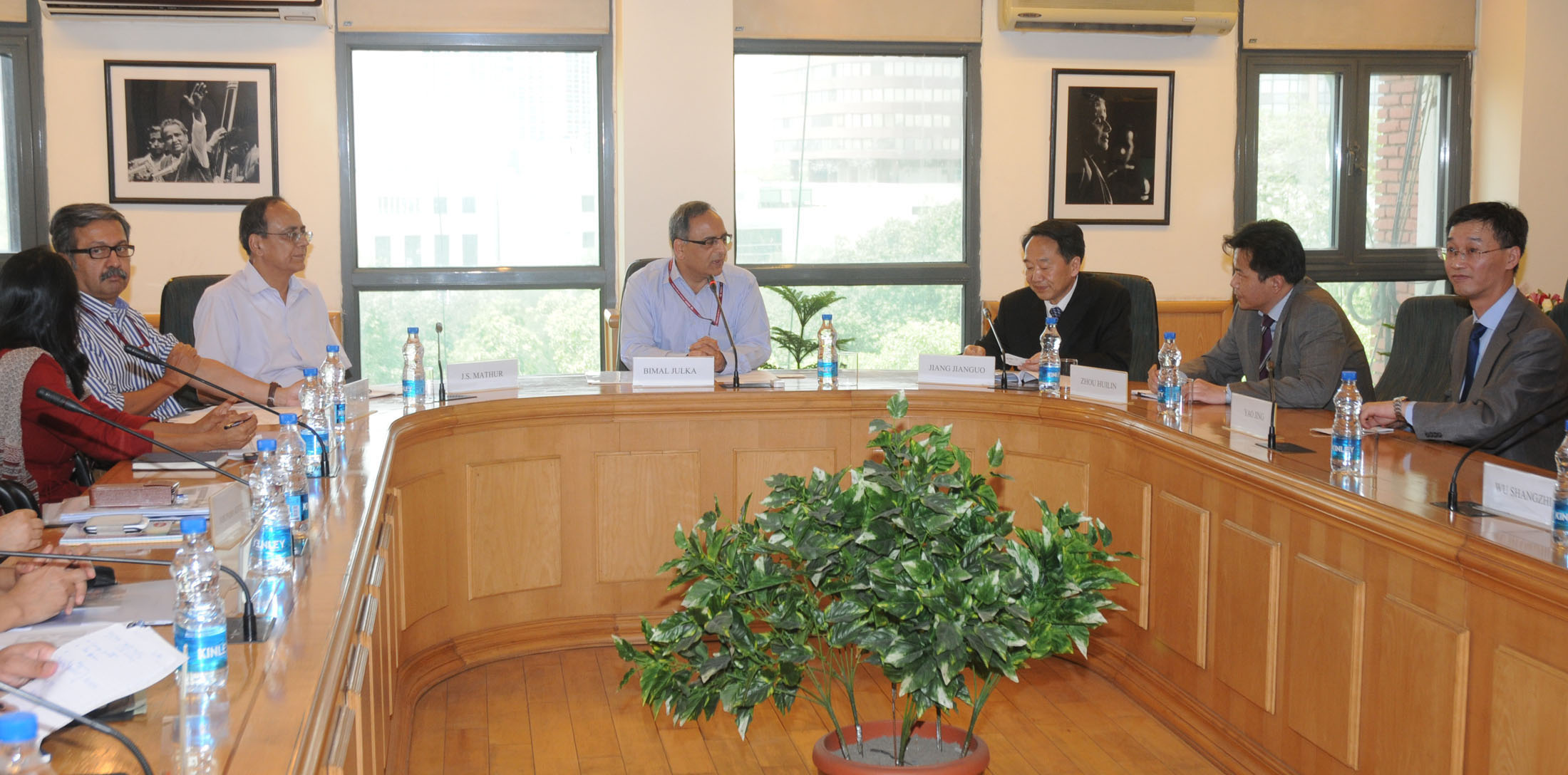
- (Right of center)

Director of the State Council Information Office
- In office 9 January 2015 – 25 July 2018
- Preceded by: Cai Mingzhao
- Succeeded by: Xu Lin

Personal details
- Born: December 1956 (age 69) Hanshou County, Hunan
- Party: Chinese Communist Party
- Education: Hunan University

Jiang Jianguo (Chinese: 蒋建国; born December 1956) is a politician of the People's Republic of China. He has been Director of the State Council Information Office and Deputy Director of the Publicity Department of the Chinese Communist Party from January 2015 to August 2018. He formerly served as Deputy Director of State Administration of Press, Publication, Radio, Film and Television. Prior to his positions in the national government, he served as Communist Party Secretary of Shaoyang city, and Mayor of Xiangtan city in his native Hunan province.

Jiang was born in December 1956 in Hanshou County, Hunan province. He joined the Chinese Communist Party in January 1975, and entered the work force in September 1977. He graduated from Hunan University and has a master's degree in engineering.

Jiang is a member of the 18th Central Committee of the Chinese Communist Party.

Government offices
Preceded by Cai Mingzhao	Director of the State Council Information Office; 2015 – 2018	Succeeded by Xu Lin
