= Yang Dongliang =

Chinese politician

- 杨栋梁
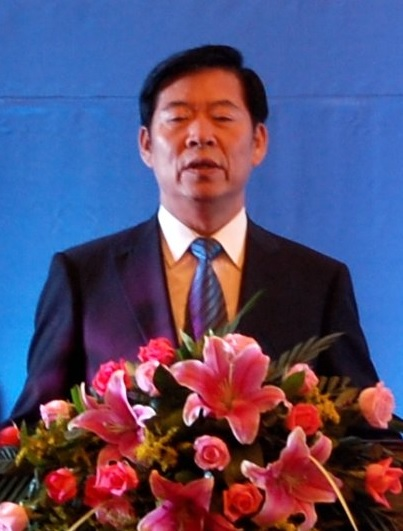
- Yang Dongliang

Director of the State Administration of Work Safety
- In office December 2012 – August 2015
- Preceded by: Luo Lin
- Succeeded by: Yang Huanning

Vice-Mayor of Tianjin
- In office March 2001 – May 2012
- Mayor: Huang Xingguo

Personal details
- Born: January 1954 (age 72) Qing County, Hebei, China
- Party: Chinese Communist Party (expelled)
- Children: Son: Yang Hui
- Education: Beijing Petroleum Management Cadre Institute; Central Party School of the Chinese Communist Party; China University of Political Science and Law

Yang Dongliang (simplified Chinese: 杨栋梁; traditional Chinese: 楊棟樑; pinyin: Yáng Dòngliáng; born January 1954) is a former Chinese politician who spent most of his career in the city of Tianjin in northern China. He has successively served as the vice mayor of Tianjin, and the Director of the State Administration of Work Safety. In August 2015, he was put under investigation by the Communist Party's anti-corruption agency. Yang was a member of the 18th Central Committee of the Chinese Communist Party; he was the sixth member of the committee to be investigated for wrongdoing following the 18th Party Congress.

== Career ==
Yang was born and brought in Qing County, Hebei. He began work in October 1972 as an oil drill worker, and joined the Chinese Communist Party in December 1973.

From 1972 onwards, he assumed various posts in North China Petroleum Battle Command (华北石油会战指挥部; now PetroChina Huabei Oilfield Company), a state-controlled oil company which was renamed North China Petroleum Administration (华北石油管理局) in 1983. He served as its Deputy Communist Party Secretary from June 1983 to September 1987.

From September 1985 to September 1987 he studied at Beijing Petroleum Management Cadre Institute, majoring in engineering administration. From September 1995 to January 1998 he studied at Central Party School of the Chinese Communist Party, majoring in political economics. He obtained a doctorate in laws from China University of Political Science and Law in January 2007.

In March 2011, he rose to become Vice-Mayor of Tianjin.

In May 2012 he was promoted again to become the director of the State Administration of Work Safety, with the rank of a cabinet minister; in November of that year, following the 18th Party Congress, he became a member of the 18th Central Committee of the Chinese Communist Party.

On August 12, 2015, shortly after the a series of deadly explosions in Tianjin, Yang Dongliang accompanied State Councilor and Public Security Minister Guo Shengkun to Tianjin, where he had worked before his transfer, as part of an emergency response team. Yang spent the next few days in Tianjin working around the clock to manage the response. On August 18, however, the Central Commission for Discipline Inspection (CCDI) announced that he was under investigation for serious violation of laws and discipline; it was not clear if the investigation was linked to the events in Tianjin. Yang was the sixth full member of the 18th Central Committee to be investigated for wrongdoing.

On October 16, 2015, Yang was expelled from the Communist Party. The investigation accused Yang of a litany of offenses, including "violating political discipline and political rules, taking part in non-organizational activities," obstructing and interfering with the investigation, attempting to influence the work placement and promotion of his son, promoting individuals in violation of regulations, "illegally occupying public property", "changing his itinerary while on foreign trips", "wasting public funds," "taking part in very expensive entertainment activities", "using vehicles that violated regulations", "taken gifts, and cash", "violating housing regulations".

On February 21, 2017, Yang was sentenced on 15 years in prison for taking bribes worth 28.49 million yuan (~$4.14 million) and plundering the public treasury worth 270,000 yuan (~$39,000) by the Second Intermediate People's Court in Beijing.

== Personal life ==
Yang Dongliang's son, Yang Hui (杨晖), who served as general manager of Ideological and Political Department of CNOOC Gas and Power Group (中海石油气电集团有限责任公司思想政治部总经理), was also detained for investigation on August 18, 2015.

Government offices
Previous: Luo Lin (骆琳)	Director of the State Administration of Work Safety; 2012–2015	Next: Yang Huanning
