= Logistic Support Department =

Logistics department of the Central Military Commission China

Logistic Support Department of the Central Military Commission
- 中华人民共和国中央军事委员会后勤保障部

Agency overview
- Formed: 2016
- Type: Functional department of the Central Military Commission
- Jurisdiction: People's Liberation Army
- Headquarters: Ministry of National Defense compound ("August 1st Building"), Beijing
- Agency executive: PLAAF Lt Gen Chen Chi (陈炽), Director
- Parent department: Central Military Commission
- Website: chinamil.com.cn

The Logistic Support Department of the Central Military Commission (Chinese: 中央军委后勤保障部) is a first-level functional department of Theater Deputy grade under the Central Military Commission of the People's Republic of China. It was founded on January 11, 2016, under Xi Jinping's military reforms. The department organizes and leads the logistics unit construction and development, as well as administering and overseeing the barracks, housing, supplies, and hospitals of the People's Liberation Army. It is based in 22 Wanshou St, Hadian District, Beijing. Its first director was Gen. Zhao Keshi. The current director is Lt. Gen. Zhang Lin.

== History ==
The predecessor of the Logistic Support Department was the General Logistics Department of the Chinese People's Liberation Army. In the 2015 military reforms, the GLD was abolished and reorganized "Logistics Support Department of the Central Military Commission."

The CMC LSD took over the logistic administrative activities of the GSD and more, including functions such as military logistics support planning, policy research, formulation of standards and classification systems, inspection and supervision of logistics system, and coordination with the Joint Logistics Support Force operational functions. It is tasked with adjusting and optimizing the allocation of support forces, and creating logistic command systems that are compatible with the joint operational command structures, integrate the centralized and decentralized logistic support units, and support both the general and specialized supply line structures. It also undertakes military-civil fusion activities with private logistics companies such as SF Express.

On 24 November 2017, the Logistics Support Department of the Central Military Commission summarized and discussed the Support Base in Djibouti project construction experience. During this period, the Ministry and the State-owned Assets Supervision and Administration Commission of the State Council signed a strategic cooperation agreement to jointly promote military-civilian integration in the construction of military facilities.

== Organization ==
After the 2015 reforms, the LSD organizations include:

=== Functional Offices ===
- General Office (办公厅)
- Political Work Office (政治工作局)
- Joint Plans Bureau (综合计划局)
- Financial Bureau (财务局)
- Health Bureau (卫生局)
- Materiel and Energy Bureau (军需能源局)
- CMC LSD Transport and Distribution Bureau (运输投送局)
- Military Installation Construction Bureau (军事设施建设局)
- Directly Subordinate Supply Support Bureau (直属供应保障局)
- Procurement Management Bureau (采购管理局)

=== Directly subordinate units ===
- PLA Financial Consolidated Payments Management Center (集中收付管理中心)
- Jindun Publishing House (金盾出版社)

== Leadership ==
=== CMC Logistic Support Department Director ===
1. PLAGF Gen Zhao Keshi (赵克石)（2015-11—2017-8, CMC Member grade)
2. PLAGF Gen Song Puxian (宋普选)（2017-8—2019-4, Corps grade)
3. PLAGF Gen Gao Jin (高津)（2019-4—2022-1, Corps grade）
4. PLAGF Lt Gen Zhang Lin (张林) (2022-1—2025-10)
5. PLAAF Lt Gen Chen Chi (陈炽) (2025-9- present)

=== CMC Logistic Support Department Political Commissar ===
1. PLAGF Lt Gen Zhang Shengmin (张升民) （2016-7—2017-1）
2. PLAGF Lt Gen Zhang Shuguo (张书国)（2017-1—2018-8）
3. PLAAF Gen Guo Puxiao (郭普校) （2019-12—2022-1）

=== CMC Logistic Support Department Deputy Directors ===
- PLAGF Lt Gen Li Shuzhang (李书章) (2015—2017）
- PLAGF Lt Gen Sun Huangtian (孙黄田)（2015—2017）
- PLAGF Lt Gen Liu Shenjie (刘生杰)（2015—2017）
- PLAGF Maj Gen Qian Yiping (钱毅平)（2016—2020）
- PLAGF Maj Gen Li Qingjie (李清杰)（2017—2021)
- PLAN Rear Adm Wang Dazhong (王大忠)（2018-5—2021-12）
- PLAGF Maj Gen He Song (何松)（2021—present）
- PLAAF Maj Gen Chen Chi (陈炽)（2022—present）

== See also ==
- Central Military Commission (China)
  - CMC Joint Logistics Support Force
- People's Liberation Army General Logistics Department (abolished)
