= Yang Huanning =

Chinese politician (born 1957)

- 杨焕宁

Director of State Administration of Work Safety
- In office 14 October 2015 – 31 July 2017
- Preceded by: Yang Dongliang
- Succeeded by: Wang Yupu

Executive Deputy Minister of Public Security
- In office April 2008 – 14 October 2015
- Minister: Meng Jianzhu; Guo Shengkun
- Preceded by: Bai Jingfu
- Succeeded by: Fu Zhenghua

Personal details
- Born: March 1957 (age 69) Anqiu, Shandong, China
- Party: Chinese Communist Party
- Education: Southwest University of Political Science & Law; Peking University

Yang Huanning (simplified Chinese: 杨焕宁; traditional Chinese: 楊煥寧; pinyin: Yáng Huànníng; born March 1957) is a former Chinese police and security official. He served as Executive Vice Minister of Public Security (minister-rank) from 2008 to 2015, then as Director of State Administration of Work Safety until his dismissal and demotion in 2017 for violation of party discipline. He was a member of the 18th Central Committee of the Chinese Communist Party.

== Biography ==
Yang was born in Anqiu, Shandong Province in March 1957. After graduating from high school, he participated in the Down to the Countryside Movement launched by Mao Zedong. Yang was sent to Liaocheng, then he worked in Jinan Military Region as a factory worker for an air force production plant. After the resumption of National College Entrance Examination, he entered Southwest University of Political Science & Law, where he majored in criminal investigation.

In 1983, Yang was assigned to work at the Ministry of Public Security, where he served in a series of roles in the criminal investigation department. During this time he was sent to Harbin to serve as deputy police chief for a year, ostensibly to train him for larger assignments. In 1996, he was promoted to become the assistant of Minister of Public Security (department-level), a position he held until 2001.

In 2001, Yang earned a doctorate in law from Peking University. At the same year, he was promoted to become Vice Minister of Public Security. During his tenure as vice minister, he sat on coordination committees overseeing Xinjiang and Tibet affairs, as well as the external propaganda committee. For a period of time, he worked under then Minister of Public Security Zhou Yongkang. Yang emerged as one of the chief "anti-terrorism" experts in the Chinese government. In October 2003, he led the Chinese delegation to attend a security summit of the Shanghai Cooperation Organisation in Tashkent. In February 2004, he again represented China at the ministers security conference in Bali, Indonesia. In January 2005, when he was transferred to Heilongjiang and appointed the Secretary of the Heilongjiang Provincial Political and Legal Affairs Commission, earning a seat on the provincial Party Standing Committee.

In April 2008, shortly before the 2008 Beijing Olympics, Yang was transferred to Beijing as the executive deputy minister of Public Security; the executive deputy minister was the second-highest-ranked official at the ministry and was tasked with handling routine administrative affairs, and has the same rank as a minister of state. He served under Meng Jianzhu and Guo Shengkun. It was said that Yang was brought back to the ministry to oversee Tibet and Xinjiang affairs to ensure that 'separatist' elements do not disrupt the Games. Following the 18th Party Congress, Yang issued an important statement on behalf of the Ministry on the abolition of re-education through labour, one of the major reforms under Xi Jinping. Yang also took part in the search and rescue efforts following the 2015 Tianjin explosions.

On 14 October 2015, Yang became the director of State Administration of Work Safety, replacing Yang Dongliang, who was investigated for corruption.

Yang's last public appearance was in April 2017 at a coal safety event in Hebei province. Thereafter, he disappeared from public view. In July 2017, his profile was removed from the "list of leaders" pane of the website of the State Administration of Work Safety. On July 31, 2017, the Central Commission for Discipline Inspection announced that Yang was placed on two-year probation within the Party, and demoted three grades to a Sub-Bureau-Director level (fujuji) "non-leading" position. The investigation accused Yang of "violating political rules and political discipline" and departing from party consciousness on "major matters of principle."

Yang was an alternate member of the 17th Central Committee of the Chinese Communist Party and a full member of the 18th Central Committee.
