= Fan Changmi =

Chinese lieutenant general

- 范长秘

Deputy Political Commissar of the Lanzhou Military Region
- In office July 2014 – December 2014
- Preceded by: Miao Hua
- Succeeded by: Kang Chunyuan

Director of the Political Department of the Lanzhou Military Region
- In office July 2012 – July 2014
- Preceded by: Miao Hua
- Succeeded by: Xu Yuanlin

Political Commissar of the 47th Army
- In office December 2006 – July 2012
- Preceded by: Chu Yimin
- Succeeded by: Zhang Fuji

Personal details
- Born: June 1955 (age 71) Laoling, Shandong, China
- Party: Chinese Communist Party (1974–2016; expelled)
- Education: PLA Army Command College

Military service
- Allegiance: People's Republic of China
- Branch/service: People's Liberation Army Ground Force
- Rank: Lieutenant general

Chinese name
- Traditional Chinese: 范長秘
- Simplified Chinese: 范长秘
Transcriptions
Standard Mandarin
- Hanyu Pinyin: Fàn Chángmì

Fan Changmi (Chinese: 范长秘; born June 1955) is a former lieutenant general of the People's Liberation Army of China. In December 2014, he was under investigation by the PLA's anti-corruption agency. He served as Deputy Political Commissar of the Lanzhou Military Region, one of the seven military regions in China, but was placed under investigation for corruption in 2014.

Fan was an alternate of the 18th Central Committee of the Chinese Communist Party and a member of the 11th National People's Congress.

== Life and career ==
Fan was born and raised in Laoling, Shandong. He graduated from PLA Ground Force Command Academy in Nanjing.

He joined the People's Liberation Army in December 1972, and joined the Chinese Communist Party in April 1974. In 1998 he was appointed head of propaganda of the political department of the 47th Group Army, a position he held until 1999, when he was appointed head of Propaganda of the Political Department of the Lanzhou Military Region, later Director of the Political Department of the 21st Group Army. He attained the rank of major general in July 2004. In November 2005, he was appointed Director of the Political Department of the Xinjiang Military District, he remained in that position until December 2006, when he was transferred to the Nanjing Military Region, and appointed Political Commissar of the 47th Army. Fan served as Director of the Political Department of the Lanzhou MR from July 2012 to July 2014, and was appointed Deputy Political Commissar of the Lanzhou MR in July 2014. In December 2014, he was placed under investigation by the PLA's anti-corruption agency.

Military offices
Preceded by Chu Yimin	Director of the Political Department of the 21st Group Army; 2003–2005	Succeeded by Wu Yude
Preceded by Chu Yimin	Director of the Political Department of Xinjiang Military Region; 2005–2006	Succeeded by Deng Ningfeng
Preceded by Chu Yimin	Political Commissar of the 47th Army; 2006–2012	Succeeded by Zhang Fuji (张福基)
Preceded by Miao Hua	Director of the Political Department of the Lanzhou Military Region; 2012–2014	Succeeded by Xu Yuanlin (徐远林)
Preceded by Miao Hua	Deputy Political Commissar of the Lanzhou Military Region; 2014–2014	Succeeded by Kang Chunyuan (康春元)
