= Cai Mingzhao =

Chinese journalist and politician

- 蔡名照
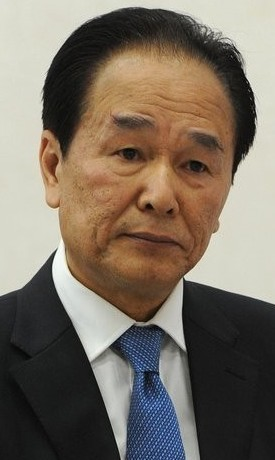
- Cai Mingzhao in 2016

Deputy Director of the Education, Science, Health and Sports Committee of the Chinese People's Political Consultative Conference
- Incumbent
- Assumed office 11 November 2020
- Director: Yuan Guiren

President and Party Branch Secretary of the Xinhua News Agency
- In office December 2014 – October 2020
- Preceded by: Li Congjun
- Succeeded by: He Ping

Director of the Central Office of Foreign Propaganda
- In office May 2013 – December 2014
- Preceded by: Wang Chen
- Succeeded by: Jiang Jianguo

Deputy Head of the Publicity Department of the Central Committee
- In office May 2013 – December 2014
- Preceded by: Wang Chen
- Succeeded by: Jiang Jianguo

Director of the State Council Information Office
- In office March 2013 – December 2014
- Preceded by: Wang Chen
- Succeeded by: Jiang Jianguo

Chief Editor of the People's Daily
- In office November 2012 – April 2013
- Preceded by: Wu Hengquan
- Succeeded by: Yang Zhenwu

Personal details
- Born: 16 June 1955 (age 71) Rizhao, Shandong, China
- Party: Chinese Communist Party
- Education: Nanjing Normal University

Cai Mingzhao (Chinese: 蔡名照; pinyin: Cài Míngzhào; born 16 June 1955) is a Chinese politician and journalist. He was appointed president of the Xinhua News Agency in December 2014, succeeding Li Congjun, who had retired. Cai formerly served as deputy director of the State Council Information Office from 2001 to 2009, editor-in-chief of the People's Daily from September 2012 to April 2013, and director of the State Council Information Office from April 2013 to December 2014.

== Biography ==
Cai was born in June 1955 in Rizhao, Shandong province.

He joined the People's Liberation Army in 1970, and the Chinese Communist Party in 1974. He graduated from Nanjing Normal University in 1983, majoring in Chinese. He worked for the Xinhua News Agency, specializing in science reporting. On November 11, 2020, he was appointed deputy director of the Education, Science, Health and Sports Committee of the Chinese People's Political Consultative Conference.

Cai served as a member of the 18th and 19th Central Committee of the Chinese Communist Party.

Party political offices
Previous: Wu Hengquan	Chief Editor of the People's Daily; 2012-2013	Next: Yang Zhenwu
Previous: Wang Chen	Deputy Head of the Publicity Department of the Central Committee; 2013-2014	Next: Jiang Jianguo
Previous: Wang Chen	Director of the Central Office of Foreign Propaganda; 2013-2014	Next: Jiang Jianguo
Previous: Li Congjun	Party Branch Secretary of Xinhua News Agency; 2014-2020	Next: He Ping
Government offices
Previous: Wang Chen	Director of the State Council Information Office; 2013-2014	Next: Jiang Jianguo
Previous: Li Congjun	President of Xinhua News Agency; 2014-2020	Next: He Ping
