= Niu Zhizhong =

Chinese former officer

- 牛志忠

Chief of Staff of the People's Armed Police
- In office July 2009 – July 2015
- Preceded by: Wang Jianping
- Succeeded by: Liu Zhenli

Personal details
- Born: March 1955 (age 71) Leting County, Tangshan, Hebei, China
- Party: Chinese Communist Party (expelled)

Military service
- Allegiance: People's Republic of China
- Branch/service: People's Armed Police
- Years of service: 1970–2016
- Rank: Lieutenant general

Niu Zhizhong (Chinese: 牛志忠; pinyin: Niǘ Zhìzhōng; born March 1955) a former officer in the People's Armed Police of China. At the height of his career, he served as deputy commander of the People's Armed Police. He was an alternate of the 18th Central Committee of the Chinese Communist Party. He was expelled from the Chinese Communist Party in 2016.

== Biography ==
Niu was born in Laoting County, Hebei in March 1955. He joined the People's Liberation Army in December 1970. He worked in the 38th Army for a long time. In 1996, he was transferred to the People's Armed Police. He then continued working in the People's Armed Police, holding positions as division commander of the 4th Division, chief commander of Tibet Armed Police Corps, and chief commander of Guangdong Armed Police Corps. In 2007 he became deputy chief of staff of the People's Armed Police, rising to chief of staff in 2009. In 2015 he was promoted to deputy commander of the People's Armed Police.

Niu became an alternate of the 18th Central Committee of the Chinese Communist Party in 2012. On October 27, 2016, Niu was expelled from the Chinese Communist Party at the 6th plenary session of the 18th Central Committee of the Chinese Communist Party.

Military offices
Preceded by Wang Jianping	Chief of Staff of the People's Armed Police; 2009–2015	Succeeded by Liu Zhenli
