= 18th Politburo =

18th Politburo may refer to:

- 18th Politburo of the Chinese Communist Party
- Politburo of the 18th Congress of the All-Union Communist Party (Bolsheviks)
- 18th Politburo of the Communist Party of Czechoslovakia
