= Yu Zhongfu =

Chinese general and political commisar

Air Force General Yu Zhongfu
- 于忠福

13th Political Commissar of the PLA Air Force
- In office July 2015 – January 2022
- Preceded by: Tian Xiusi
- Succeeded by: Guo Puxiao

Personal details
- Born: July 1956 (age 70) Laiyang, Shandong, China
- Party: Chinese Communist Party
- Education: Central China Normal University; Central Party School

Military service
- Allegiance: China
- Branch/service: People's Liberation Army Air Force
- Years of service: 1974 – present
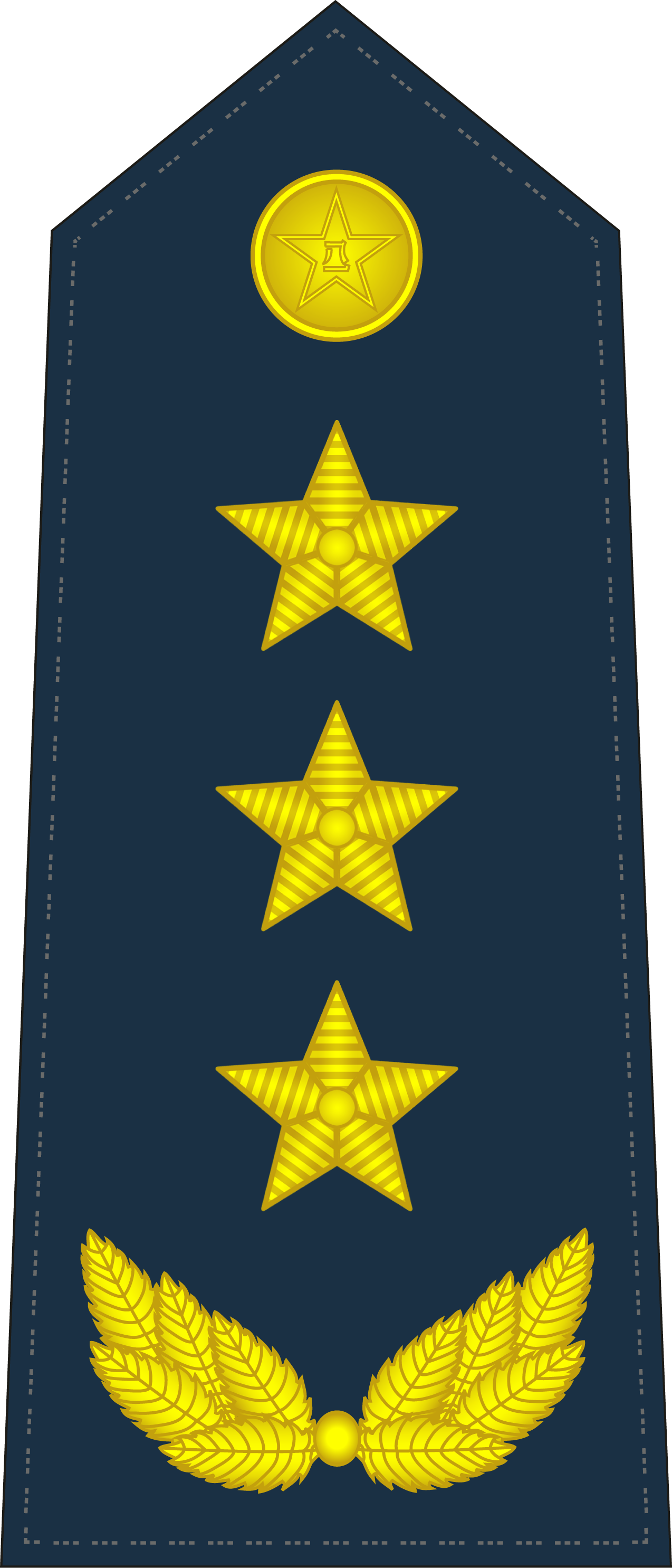
- Rank: Air Force General

Yu Zhongfu (Chinese: 于忠福; born July 1956) is a general of the People's Liberation Army Air Force (PLAAF) of China. Having served in the PLAAF for more than 40 years, he was appointed Political Commissar of the PLAAF in July 2015. He was replaced by general Guo Puxiao in January 2022.

== Biography ==
Yu Zhongfu was born in July 1956 in Laiyang, Shandong Province. He joined the People's Liberation Army in 1974, initially serving in the Wuhan Military Region. He is a graduate of Central China Normal University and the Central Party School, and holds a master's degree.

Yu has served in the PLAAF for more than 40 years, and successively held the positions of political commissar of the 19th and then 24th Air Force divisions, and deputy director of the political department of the Nanjing Military Region.

When Xi Jinping was in charge of Shanghai as the municipality's Communist Party secretary in 2007, Yu served as political commissar of the Air Force Shanghai Command. He then worked as director of the political department of the Lanzhou Military Region Air Force, and deputy director of the political department of the PLAAF.

After Xi Jinping became the General Secretary of the Chinese Communist Party, the top leader of China in 2012, Yu Zhongfu changed his leadership positions three times within three years. In November 2012, he was appointed political commissar of the Jinan Military Region Air Force as well as deputy political commissar of the Jinan MR. In July 2014, he became political commissar of the Nanjing Military Region Air Force and deputy political commissar of the Nanjing MR, succeeding Lieutenant General Song Kun, who had been promoted to deputy political commissar of the PLAAF. Yu attained the rank of lieutenant general (zhong jiang) soon afterwards.

In July 2015, Yu replaced the retiring general Tian Xiusi as the 13th political commissar of the PLA Air Force, and became the superior of his predecessor Song Kun. On July 28, 2017, he was promoted to the rank of General.

== Personal ==
Yu Zhongfu is also a writer and calligrapher. Several of his articles have won military research awards, and he has been called the "calligrapher of the armed forces".
