= State Administration of Work Safety =

Chinese government agency, 1999–2018

The State Administration of Work Safety (SAWS; Chinese: 国家安全生产监督管理总局), reporting to the State Council, was the non-ministerial agency of the Government of the People's Republic of China responsible for the regulation of risks to occupational safety and health in China. Its responsibilities were taken over by the Ministry of Emergency Management in March 2018.

== History ==
- 1999: Established as the State Administration of Coal Mine Safety Supervision, managed by the State Economic and Trade Commission
- 2001: The State Council approves the formation of the State Administration of Work Safety, a second name within the same agency.
- 2003: The agency moved to be directly managed by the State Council at a vice-ministerial level.
- 2005: The agency is moved to be managed by the State Council at a ministerial level, while the State Administration of Coal Mine Safety moves to vice-ministerial level.
- 2018: On March 19, 2018, following the 2018 National People's Congress, the agency's responsibilities became part of the newly formed Ministry of Emergency Management.

== Organizational Structure ==
=== National Bureau managed by the General Administration ===
- State Administration of Coal Mine Safety

=== Public Institutions managed by the General Administration ===
- National Safety Production Emergency Rescue Command Center

=== Internal Organizations of the General Administration ===
- General Office (International Cooperation Department, Finance Department): Handles documents, information, confidentiality, archives, financial management, international cooperation, and institutional reform.
- Department of Policy and Regulations: Drafts laws and regulations on production safety, formulates safety standards, and oversees legal reviews and publicity.
- Planning and Technology Department: Develops safety plans, manages scientific research, oversees fixed asset projects, and coordinates safety evaluations.
- Production Safety Emergency Rescue Office (Statistics Department, Dispatching Center): Manages safety statistics, control indicators, accident reporting, and comprehensive management of safety data.
- First Department of Safety Supervision and Management (Offshore Oil Operation Safety Office): Supervises non-coal mining and petroleum industries, including safety conditions and equipment.
- Second Department of Safety Supervision and Management: Oversees safety management in industries with special safety regulations, and handles serious accident investigations.
- The Third Department of Safety Supervision and Management: Regulates chemical, pharmaceutical, and hazardous chemical industries, including safety standards and accident investigations.
- The Fourth Department of Safety Supervision and Management: Supervises safety in metallurgical, nonferrous, building materials, machinery, light industry, textile, tobacco, and commerce industries.
- Department of Occupational Safety and Health Supervision and Management: Monitors occupational health in workplaces, manages safety licenses, and handles occupational hazard incidents.
- Personnel Department (Publicity and Education Office): Manages personnel, safety training, professional qualifications, and the National Safety Production Supervisory Commissioner.
- Party Committee
- Bureau of Retired and Resigned Cadres: Manages retired and resigned cadres and guides related work in affiliated units.

=== Institutions directly under the General Administration ===
- State Administration of Work Safety Dispatching Center
- International Exchange and Cooperation Center
- Archives of the State Administration of Work Safety (Coal Industry Archives)
- State Administration of Work Safety Service Center (Service Bureau)
  - Xijiao Guest House
  - Dongsi Guesthouse
  - Dongdan Guest House
- Armoury Guest House
- Mine Rescue Command Center
- Publicity and Education Center (Coal Industry Exhibition Center)
- State Administration of Work Safety Training Center (Coal Industry Talent Exchange and Training Center)
- Research Center (China Coal Industry Development Research Center)
- Communications and Information Center (Communication and Information Center of Coal Industry)
- China Institute of Safety Science and Technology
- Chemical Registration Center
- China Production Safety News Agency (China Coal News Agency)
- Information Research Institute (Coal Information Research Institute)
- Coal General Hospital (Mine Medical Rescue Center)
- North China Institute of Science and Technology (China Coal Mine Safety Technology Training Center)
- Party School
- China Coal Mine Art Troupe (China Work Safety Art Troupe)
- Occupational Safety and Health Research Center (Coal Industry Occupational Medicine Research Center)
- China Coal Miners' Beidaihe Sanatorium (Beidaihe Training Center)
- China Coal Mine Workers Dalian Sanatorium (Dalian Training Center)
- Kunming Sanatorium for Chinese Coal Miners (Kunming Training Center)
- Coal Industry Vocational Skills Certification Guidance Center
- Coal Comprehensive Utilization and Diversified Operation Technology Consulting Center

=== Social Organizations under the Supervision of the General Administration ===
- China Work Safety Association
- China Occupational Safety and Health Association
- China Coal Mine Pneumoconiosis Treatment Foundation
- China Coal Industry Labor Protection Science and Technology Society
- China Ropeway Association
- China Chemical Safety Association
- China Fireworks and Firecrackers Association

== List of directors ==
- Sun Huashan (孙华山): (July 2003 - February 2005)
- Li Yizhong (李毅中): February 2005 – March 2008
- Wang Jun (王君): March 2008 – November 2008
- Luo Lin (骆琳): December 2008 – December 2012
- Yang Dongliang: December 2012 – August 2015 (fired; convicted of corruption and sentenced to 15 years in prison)
- Yang Huanning: 14 October 2015 – July 2017 (fired)
- Wang Yupu: September 2017 – March 2018 (agency defunct)
