= Compilation and Translation Bureau =

Group under the Central Committee of the Chinese Communist Party

The Central Compilation and Translation Bureau (Chinese: [中共]中央编译局) was an organ under the Central Committee of the Chinese Communist Party established in 1953. Its primary responsibility, according to official sources, is to "research key Marxist works" and translate foreign language Marxist writings.

Under the plan on deepening reform of Party and State Institutions, the Compilation and Translation Bureau was abolished, and the functions were merged with the Institute of Party History and Literature in March 2018.

== Work ==
The main duties of the Central Compilation and Translation Bureau were to compile, translate, and research classical Marxist works. They researched the theory of Marxism and its development in the contemporary era and its history with a focus on Marx, Engels, Lenin and Stalin. It has also translated the works of Chinese Leaders into different languages.

After founding the Party, intellectuals and Communist Party members made it very important to translate Marxist works so they could introduce them to China. The party established the Marxism–Leninism College in 1938, located in Yan'an.

The Bureau was originally the Office for the Translation of Mao Zedong's Works, and it later became better known as the Central Compilation and Translation Bureau.

== Impact ==
The Central Compilation and Translation Bureau compiled and translated the first edition of the Collected Works of Marx and Engels (50 volumes), the first edition of the Collected Works of Lenin (38 volumes), the second edition of the Collected Works of Lenin (60 volumes) and the Collected Works of Stalin (13 volumes). The CCTB also published a number of selected works like collections of monographs, collections of statements on various issues, selected readings, and single-volume works.

The CCTB was listed as a national high-end think tank in 2015.

The CCTB was known as being "one of the premier institutions devoted to the research of Marxism in China." It was still one of the most prominent organs that is authorized to translate the writings of Marx, Engels, Lenin, and Stalin.

== Compilation & Translation Press ==
Affiliated with the Central Compilation & Translation Bureau, the Central Compilation & Translation Press was established in 1993 to translate and publish works of scholarly works on politics, economics, philosophy and culture in the word. The CCTP emphasized Marxism and their goal was to "be a cultural bridge between the east and west."

== Theoretical research ==
One of the main tasks of CCTB was theoretical research, which was mostly done by the Institute of Contemporary Marxism and the Institute of World Socialism. The main task of theoretical research was to follow the lead of the Central Committee's Project to Study and Develop Marxist Theory. The CCTB participated in over 200 investigations and research projects, they also published over 400 monographs, compilations, translations, and academic papers.

== List of directors ==
- Wei Jianhua (July 1996 – February 2010)
- Yi Junqing (February 2010 – January 2013)
- Jia Gaojian (January 2013 – March 2018)

In February 2010, Yi Junqing was promoted to director of the CCTB. While in this position, he played a major role in developing the Confidence Doctrine, a political philosophy that "calls for Communist Party members, government officials, and the Chinese people to be 'confident in our chosen path, confident in our political system, and confident in our guiding theories.'" He stayed in this position until January 17, 2013, when he was dismissed for his "improper lifestyle" and was replaced by Jia Gaojian.

== Documentary Information Department ==
The Documentary Information Department, also known as the Library, was one of the main institutions of the CCTB. Its main responsibilities were Marxism and socialism. They also constructed and serviced documents that provided information related to the business field of the CCTB. The Documentary Information Department edited the website, and did maintenance work while being responsible for the compilation and research of public opinion information.

== History ==
The Central Compilation and Translation Bureau has advocated for new and innovative ideas for political and economic reforms. Many foreign scholars and organizations have worked with the CCTB, including the Ford Foundation, the Friedrich Ebert Foundation and the Carter Center. The origins of the CCTB can be traced back to at least three other places: the Translation Department of Marx-Lenin College in the early 1940s, the Russian Translation Group during 1946–1949, and the Russian Compilation Translation Bureau in Beijing in 1949. These groups specialized in translating important policies and works. In 1962, the Central Compilation and Translation Bureau took over the Central Liaison Department. This office translated works of Chinese Leader and Chinese documents into foreign languages. The CCTB played an instrumental role in opening up Chinese academia to many foreign ideas and trends.
