= Zhang Lin (general) =

Chinese general (born 1965)

- 张林

Head of the Logistic Support Department of the Central Military Commission
- In office January 2022 – October 2025
- Preceded by: Gao Jin

Personal details
- Born: 1965 (age 60–61) China
- Party: Chinese Communist Party (expelled in 2026)

Military service
- Allegiance: People's Republic of China
- Branch/service: People's Liberation Army Ground Force
- Years of service: ?–present
- Rank: Lieutenant general

Chinese name
- Simplified Chinese: 张林
- Traditional Chinese: 張林
Transcriptions
Standard Mandarin
- Hanyu Pinyin: Zhāng Lín

Zhang Lin (Chinese: 张林; born 1965) was a lieutenant general in the People's Liberation Army of China who served as the head of the Logistic Support Department of the Central Military Commission, in office from January 2022 to October 2025. In 2026, Zhang was expelled from the Chinese Communist Party.

== Biography ==
Zhang was born in 1965. He was promoted to chief of staff of the Joint Logistics Support Force of the Central Military Commission in 2019, but having held the position for only one year, in 2020 he was appointed head of the Logistics Department of the People's Armed Police. He became director of the Agency for Offices Administration of the Central Military Commission in March 2021, and soon was commissioned as head of the Logistic Support Department of the Central Military Commission in January 2022.

He attained the rank of lieutenant general (zhongjiang) in January 2022.

== Downfall ==
On September 12, 2025, he was dismissed as deputy of the NPC by the Standing Committee of the National People's Congress together with General Wang Chunning, Lieutenant General Gao Daguang and Lieutenant General Wang Zhibin. On 29 October 2026, the fifth plenary session of the 20th CCP Central Committee reviewed and approved the report of the Discipline Inspection Commission of the Central Military Commission on the "serious violations of discipline and law" by Zhang and confirmed the Politburo decision to expel him from the CCP.

Military offices
Preceded by Gao Jin	Head of the Logistic Support Department of the Central Military Commission; 2022–2025	Incumbent
