= Pengxi County =

Coordinates: 30°45′43″N 105°42′18″E

Pengxi County 蓬溪县
- County
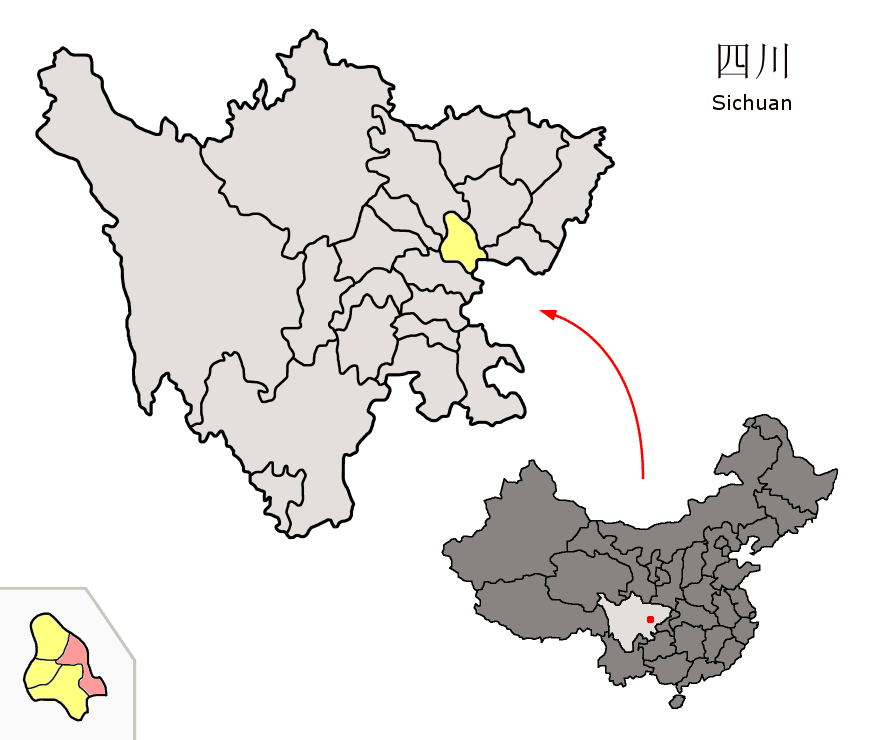
- Location of Pengxi County (red) within Suining City (yellow) and Sichuan
- Country: China
- Province: Sichuan
- Prefecture-level city: Suining
- County seat: Chicheng Town

Area
  - Total: 1,251 km^{2} (483 sq mi)

Population (2020 census)
  - Total: 430,344
  - Density: 344.0/km^{2} (891.0/sq mi)
- Time zone: UTC+8 (China Standard)

Pengxi County (Chinese: 蓬溪县; pinyin: Péngxī Xiàn) is a county of Sichuan Province, China, bordering Chongqing to the southeast. It is under the administration of Suining city.

== Administrative divisions ==
Pengxi County comprises 1 subdistrict, 17 towns and 2 townships:

subdistrict

- Pu'an 普安街道

towns

- Chicheng 赤城镇
- Xinhui 新会镇
- Wenjing 文井镇
- Mingyue 明月镇
- Changle 常乐镇
- Tianfu 天福镇
- Hongjiang 红江镇
- Baofan 宝梵镇
- Dashi 大石镇
- Jixiang 吉祥镇
- Mingfeng 鸣凤镇
- Renlong 任隆镇
- Sanfeng 三凤镇
- Pengnan 蓬南镇
- Qunli 群利镇
- Jinqiao 金桥镇
- Huaihua 槐花镇

townships

- Heye 荷叶乡
- Gaosheng 高升乡

== Climate ==
Climate data for Pengxi, elevation 395 m (1,296 ft), (1991–2020 normals, extremes 1981–present)
Month	Jan	Feb	Mar	Apr	May	Jun	Jul	Aug	Sep	Oct	Nov	Dec	Year
Record high °C (°F)	19.4 (66.9)	23.2 (73.8)	32.1 (89.8)	34.1 (93.4)	36.4 (97.5)	36.4 (97.5)	40.6 (105.1)	41.5 (106.7)	40.6 (105.1)	31.8 (89.2)	25.8 (78.4)	17.5 (63.5)	41.5 (106.7)
Mean daily maximum °C (°F)	9.3 (48.7)	12.4 (54.3)	17.3 (63.1)	23.1 (73.6)	26.7 (80.1)	28.9 (84.0)	31.6 (88.9)	31.8 (89.2)	26.5 (79.7)	20.9 (69.6)	16.1 (61.0)	10.4 (50.7)	21.3 (70.2)
Daily mean °C (°F)	6.1 (43.0)	8.7 (47.7)	12.9 (55.2)	18.1 (64.6)	21.8 (71.2)	24.5 (76.1)	27.1 (80.8)	26.9 (80.4)	22.4 (72.3)	17.4 (63.3)	12.6 (54.7)	7.5 (45.5)	17.2 (62.9)
Mean daily minimum °C (°F)	3.7 (38.7)	6.0 (42.8)	9.7 (49.5)	14.3 (57.7)	18.0 (64.4)	21.2 (70.2)	23.7 (74.7)	23.4 (74.1)	19.7 (67.5)	15.0 (59.0)	10.2 (50.4)	5.3 (41.5)	14.2 (57.5)
Record low °C (°F)	−3.9 (25.0)	−0.9 (30.4)	−0.2 (31.6)	4.8 (40.6)	9.1 (48.4)	13.3 (55.9)	17.1 (62.8)	16.2 (61.2)	12.6 (54.7)	2.7 (36.9)	0.8 (33.4)	−4.4 (24.1)	−4.4 (24.1)
Average precipitation mm (inches)	13.9 (0.55)	16.1 (0.63)	31.3 (1.23)	61.7 (2.43)	104.1 (4.10)	159.7 (6.29)	189.0 (7.44)	177.3 (6.98)	124.9 (4.92)	71.1 (2.80)	26.0 (1.02)	12.7 (0.50)	987.8 (38.89)
Average precipitation days (≥ 0.1 mm)	8.2	7.7	9.3	10.9	12.7	13.7	12.9	10.7	13.3	14.3	8.4	7.1	129.2
Average snowy days	1.0	0.4	0	0	0	0	0	0	0	0	0	0.5	1.9
Average relative humidity (%)	84	79	75	74	73	79	80	77	82	86	85	85	80
Mean monthly sunshine hours	47.1	52.0	92.8	128.3	136.1	120.4	162.8	173.8	97.0	64.5	59.3	39.4	1,173.5
Percentage possible sunshine	15	17	25	33	32	29	38	43	26	18	19	13	26
Source: China Meteorological Administrationall-time extreme temperatureall-time July high
