= Niu Hongguang =

- 牛红光

Deputy Chief Commander of the China Manned Space Program
- In office June 2009 – December 2014

Personal details
- Born: October 1951 (age 74–75) Anqiu County, Shandong, China
- Party: Chinese Communist Party
- Education: Central Party School of the Chinese Communist Party

Military service
- Allegiance: People's Republic of China
- Branch/service: People's Liberation Army Ground Force
- Years of service: 1968–2014
- Rank: Lieutenant general

Chinese name
- Simplified Chinese: 牛红光
- Traditional Chinese: 牛紅光
Transcriptions
Standard Mandarin
- Hanyu Pinyin: Niú Hóngguāng

Niu Hongguang (Chinese: 牛红光; born October 1951) is a lieutenant general in the People's Liberation Army of China. He was a delegate to the 11th National People's Congress.

== Biography ==
Niu was born in Anqiu County (now Anqiu), Shandong, in October 1951. He attended the Affiliated High School of Peking University and graduated from the Central Party School of the Chinese Communist Party.

He enlisted in the People's Liberation Army (PLA) in 1968, serving in the Communication Regiment of the 20th Base (Jiuquan Satellite Launch Center) of the Commission for Science, Technology and Industry for National Defense, and eventually served as deputy commander. He rose to become deputy head of the People's Liberation Army General Armaments Department in June 2009, concurrently serving as deputy chief commander of the China Manned Space Program. He retired in December 2014.

He was promoted to the rank of major general (shaojiang) in July 1999 and lieutenant general (zhongjiang) in July 2010.
