= Jia Gaojian =

Jia Gaojian (simplified Chinese: 贾高建; traditional Chinese: 賈高建; pinyin: Jiǎ Gāojiàn; born May 1959) is the current director of the Central Compilation and Translation Bureau, an organ under the Central Committee of the Chinese Communist Party, a position in which he has served since January 2013. Jia is the superintendent of the Central Party School of the Chinese Communist Party and a professor and doctoral advisor at the same institution. He is also the vice president of the China Historical Materialism Society. Gao's primary research areas include Marxist philosophy and social philosophy.
