= 1983 =

1983 in various calendars
- Gregorian calendar: 1983; MCMLXXXIII
- Ab urbe condita: 2736
- Armenian calendar: 1432; ԹՎ ՌՆԼԲ
- Assyrian calendar: 6733
- Baháʼí calendar: 139–140
- Balinese saka calendar: 1904–1905
- Bengali calendar: 1389–1390
- Berber calendar: 2933
- British Regnal year: 31 Eliz. 2 – 32 Eliz. 2
- Buddhist calendar: 2527
- Burmese calendar: 1345
- Byzantine calendar: 7491–7492
- Chinese calendar: 壬戌年 (Water Dog); 4680 or 4473 — to — 癸亥年 (Water Pig); 4681 or 4474
- Coptic calendar: 1699–1700
- Discordian calendar: 3149
- Ethiopian calendar: 1975–1976
- Hebrew calendar: 5743–5744
- Hindu calendars
- Vikram Samvat: 2039–2040
- Shaka Samvat: 1904–1905
- Kali Yuga: 5083–5084
- Holocene calendar: 11983
- Igbo calendar: 983–984
- Iranian calendar: 1361–1362
- Islamic calendar: 1403–1404
- Japanese calendar: Shōwa 58 (昭和５８年)
- Javanese calendar: 1915–1916
- Juche calendar: 72
- Julian calendar: Gregorian minus 13 days
- Korean calendar: 4316
- Minguo calendar: ROC 72 民國72年
- Nanakshahi calendar: 515
- Thai solar calendar: 2526
- Tibetan calendar: ཆུ་ཕོ་ཁྱི་ལོ་ (male Water-Dog); 2109 or 1728 or 956 — to — ཆུ་མོ་ཕག་ལོ་ (female Water-Boar); 2110 or 1729 or 957
- Unix time: 410227200 – 441763199

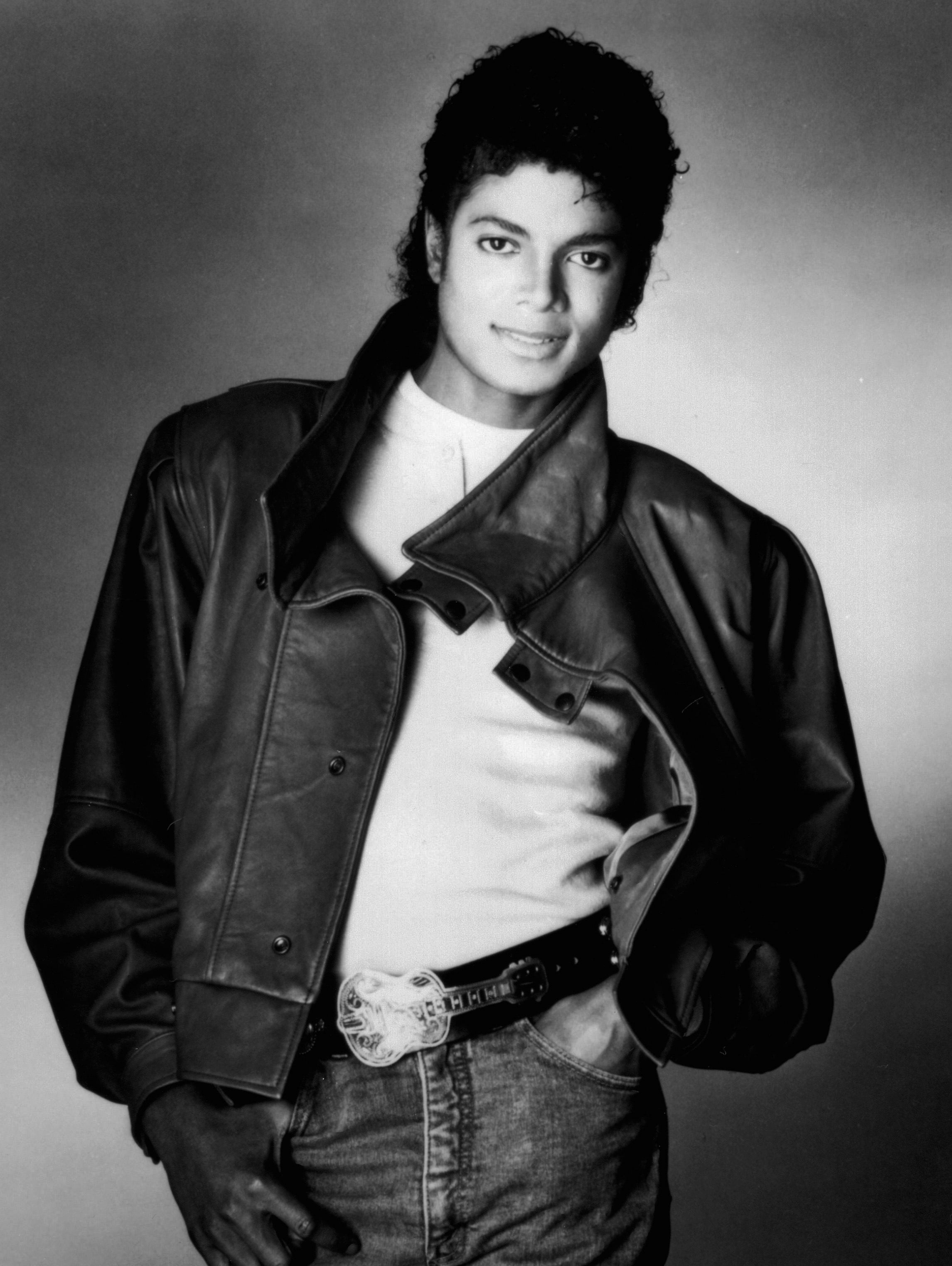
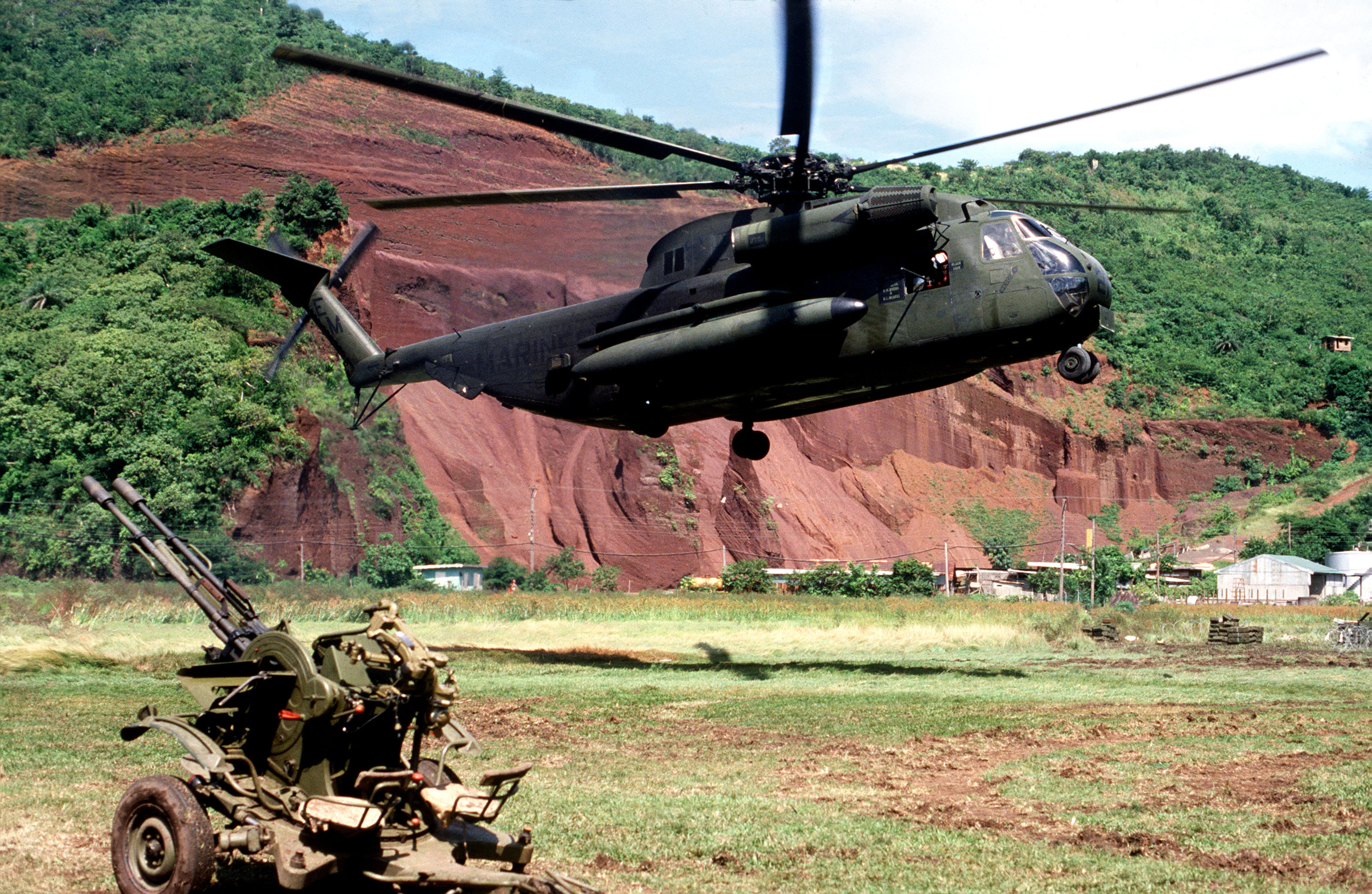
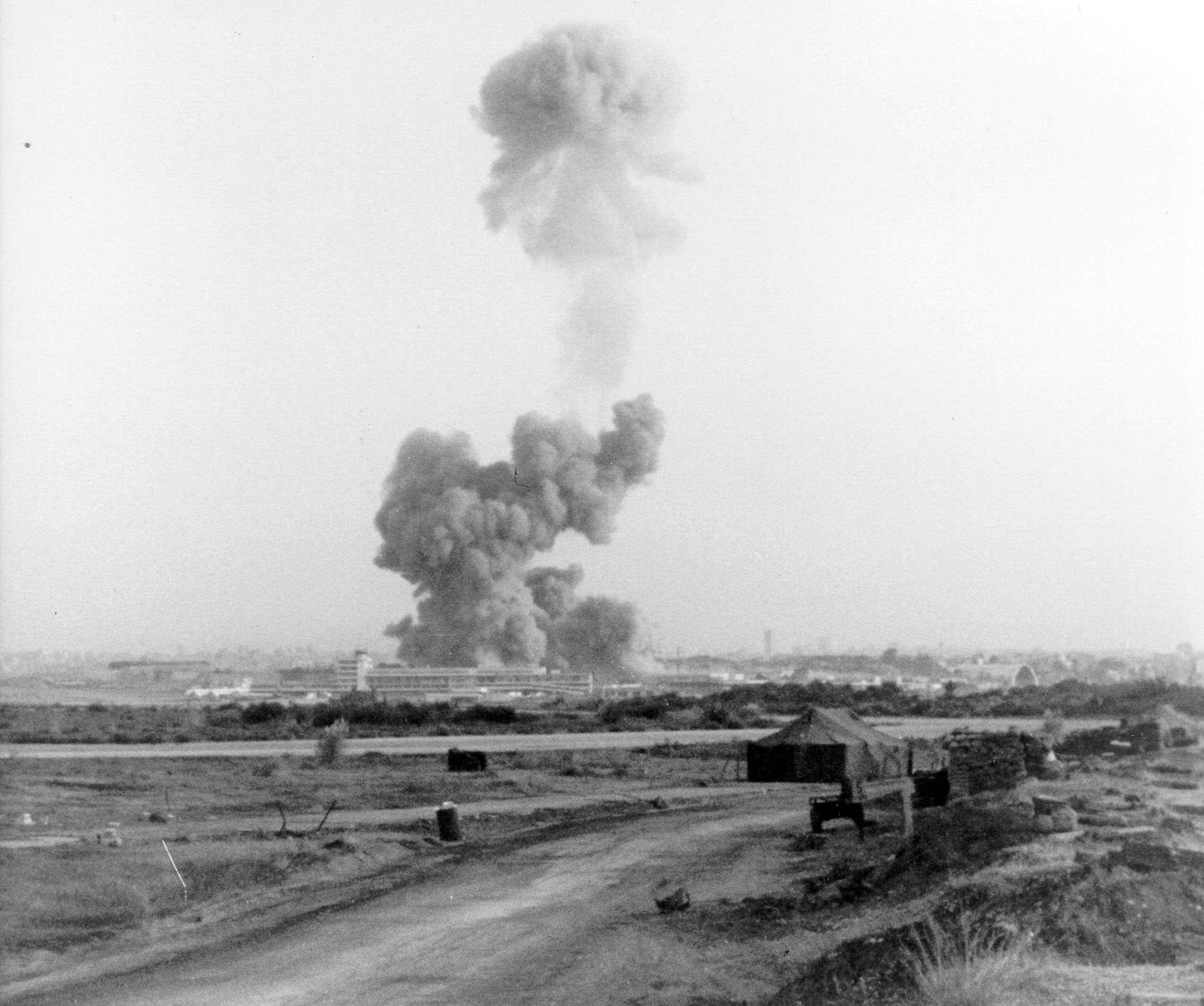
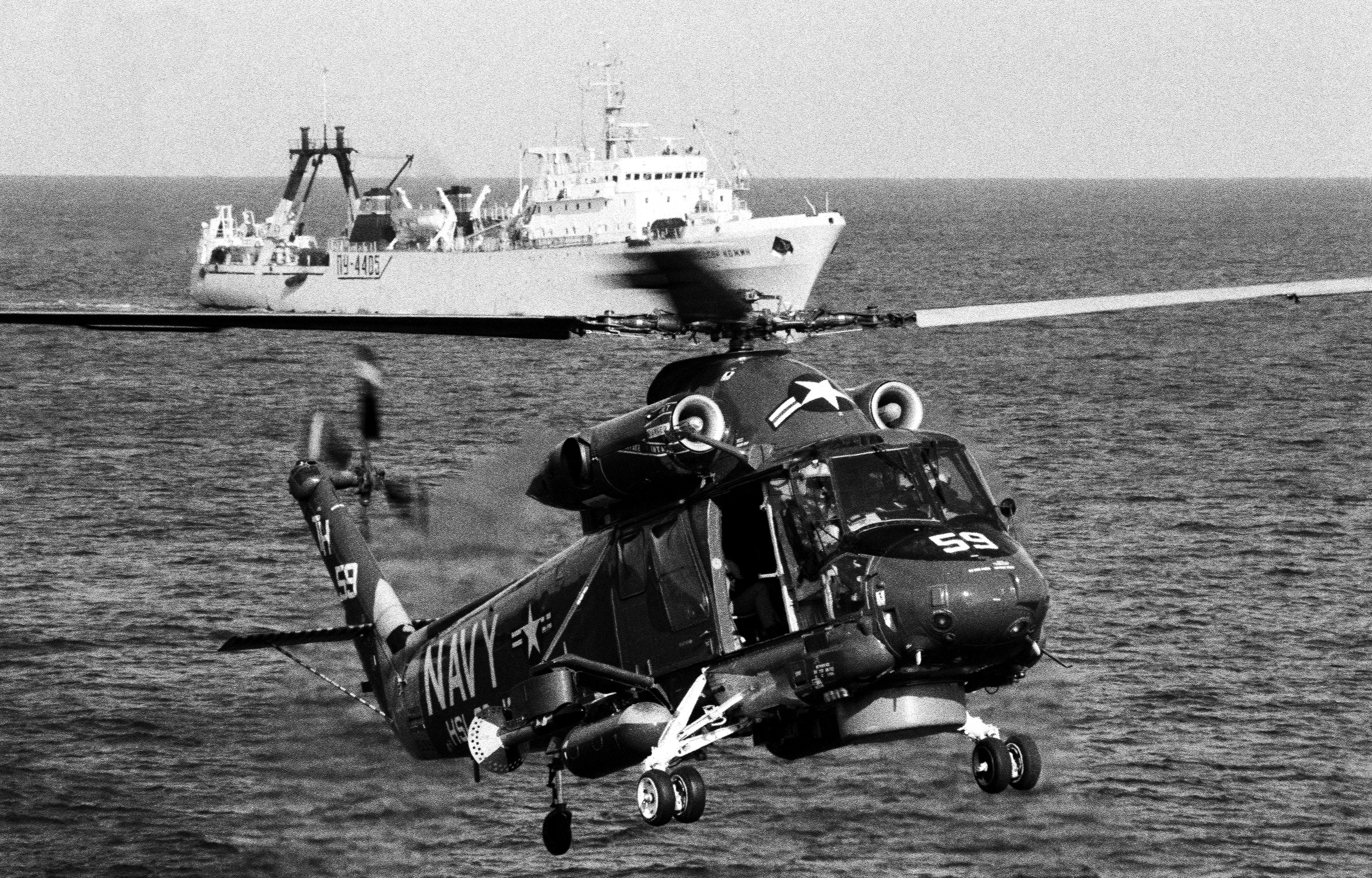
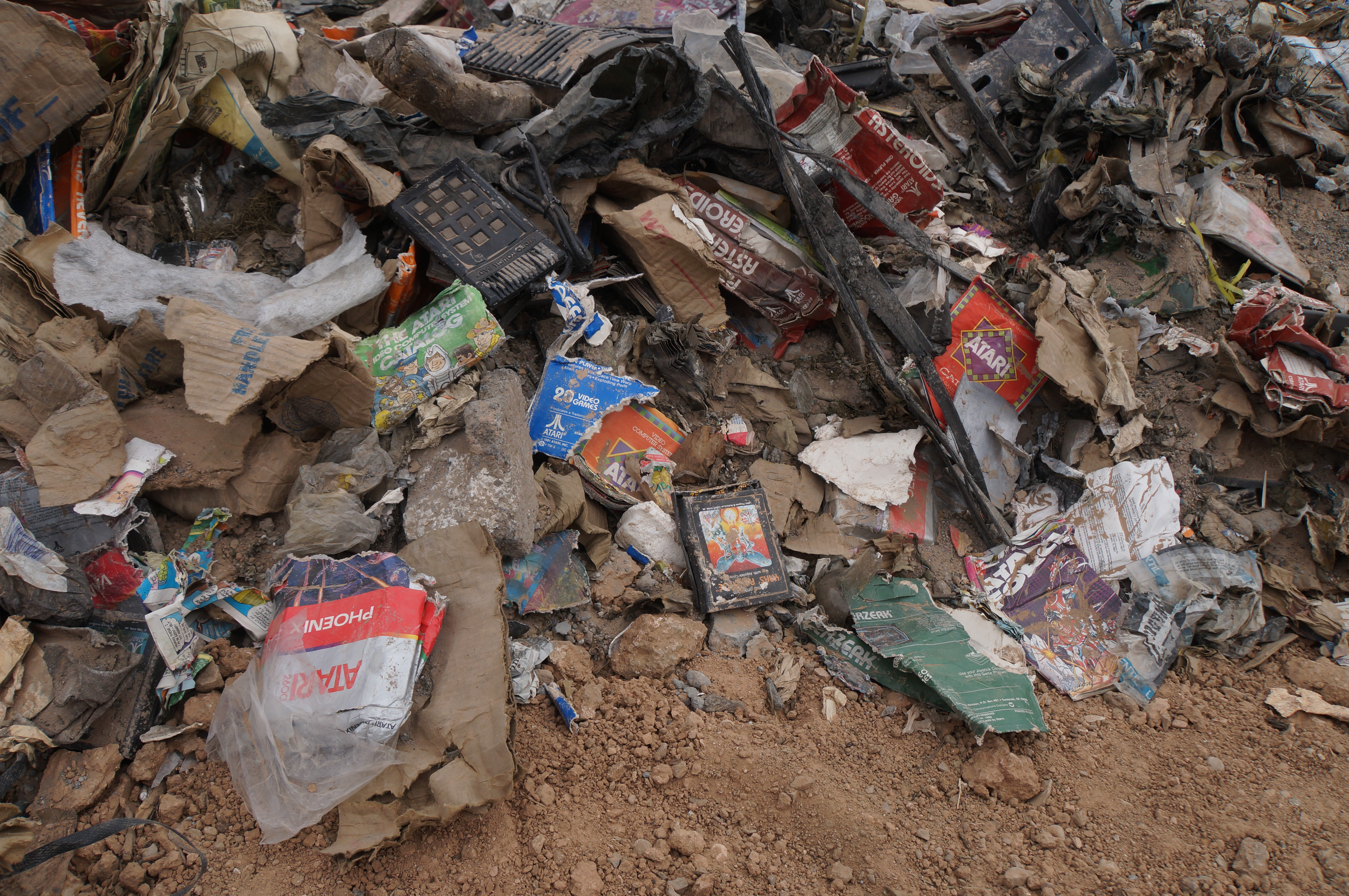
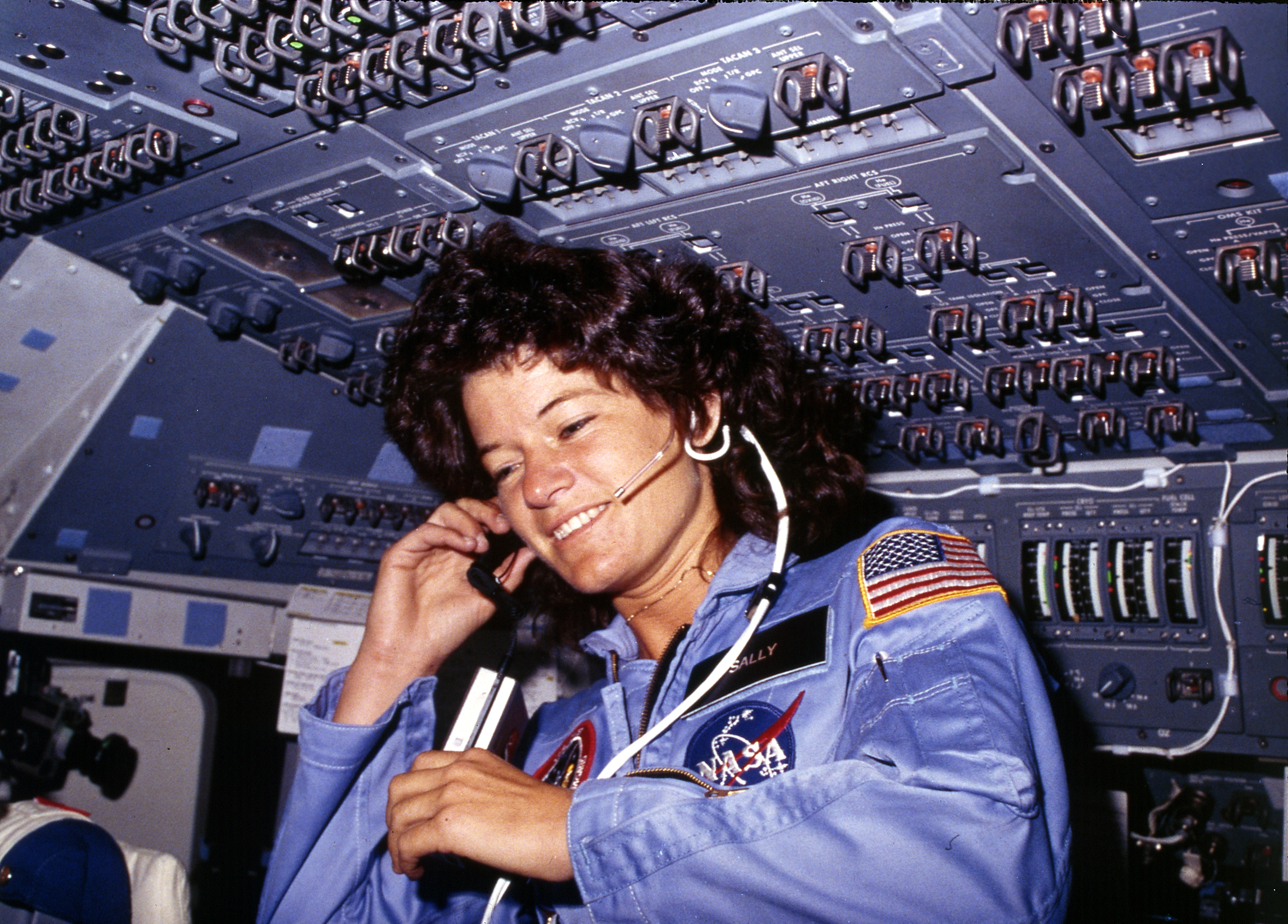
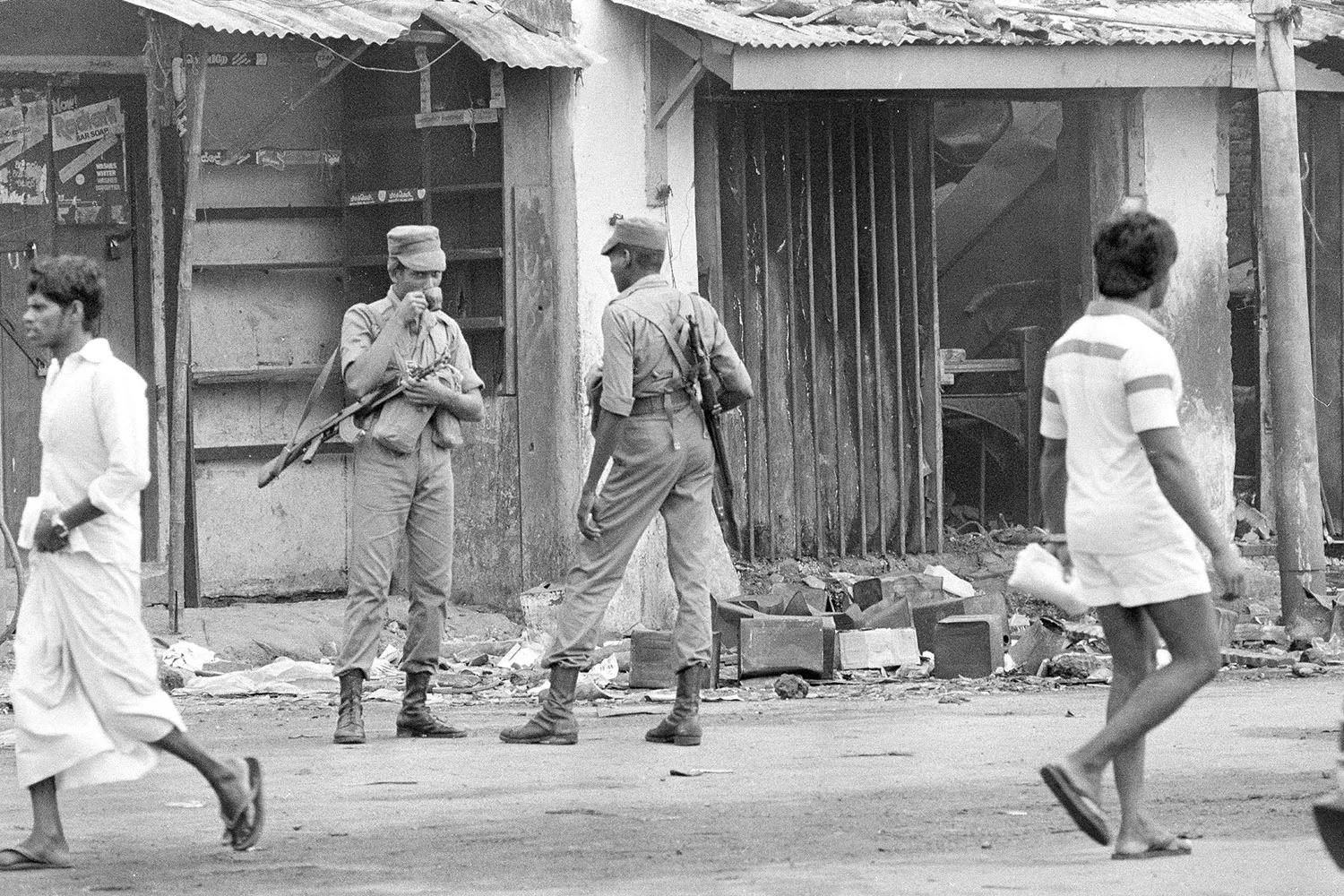
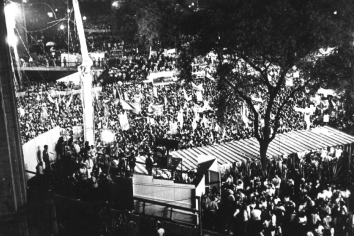
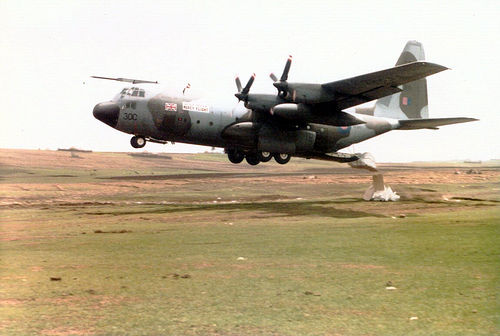
From top to bottom, left to right: Michael Jackson rises to global popularity following the success of Thriller, the best selling album of all time; the United States invasion of Grenada begins; the 1983 Beirut barracks bombings kill 307 people in Beirut; the Korean Air Lines Flight 007 is shot down by the Soviet Union near Sakhalin Island, killing all on board; the video game crash of 1983 hits the gaming industry; Sally Ride becomes the first American woman in space aboard STS-7; the Black July anti-Tamil pogrom erupts in Sri Lanka; the Diretas Já movement demands direct elections in Brazil; and the 1983–1985 famine in Ethiopia devastates Ethiopia.

1983 (MCMLXXXIII) was a common year starting on Saturday of the Gregorian calendar, the 1983rd year of the Common Era (CE) and Anno Domini (AD) designations, the 983rd year of the 2nd millennium, the 83rd year of the 20th century, and the 4th year of the 1980s decade.

1983 saw both the official beginning of the Internet and the first mobile cellular telephone call.

== Events ==
=== January ===
- January 1 – The migration of the ARPANET to TCP/IP is officially completed (this is considered to be the beginning of the true Internet).
- January 6 – Pope John Paul II appoints a bishop over the Czechoslovak exile community, which the Rudé právo newspaper calls a "provocation." This begins a year-long disagreement between the Czechoslovak Socialist Republic and the Vatican, leading to the eventual restoration of diplomatic relations between the two states.
- January 14 – The head of Bangladesh's military dictatorship, Hussain Muhammad Ershad, announces his intentions to "turn Bangladesh into an Islamic state."
- January 18 – U.S. Secretary of the Interior James G. Watt makes controversial remarks blaming poor living conditions on Native American reservations on "the failures of socialism." Watt will eventually resign in September after a series of other controversial remarks.
- January 23 – The European Economic Community's Common Fisheries Policy comes into effect.
- January 24 – 25 members of the Red Brigades are sentenced to life imprisonment for the 1978 murder of Italian politician Aldo Moro.
- January 25 – IRAS is launched from Vandenberg AFB, to conduct the world's first all-sky infrared survey from space.
- January 26 – 1983 Code of Canon Law: Pope John Paul II revises Roman Catholic canon law, the first such revision since 1917. Among the changes is a reduction in the number of offenses qualifying for automatic excommunication, from 37 to only seven.
- January 27 – The pilot shaft of the Seikan Tunnel, the world's longest sub-aqueous tunnel (53.85 km) in Japan, breaks through.
- January 30
  - Chinese newspaper People's Daily reports that the nation will run out of food and clothes by the year 2000 if the state's population control efforts are not successful.
  - The Washington Redskins defeat the Miami Dolphins to win Super Bowl XVII at the Rose Bowl in Pasadena, California.

=== February ===
- February 2 – Giovanni Vigliotto goes on trial on charges of polygamy involving 105 women.
- February 3 – Prime Minister of Australia Malcolm Fraser is granted a double dissolution of both houses of parliament, for elections on March 5, 1983. As Fraser is being granted the dissolution, Bill Hayden resigns as leader of the Australian Labor Party, and in the subsequent leadership spill Bob Hawke is elected as Hayden's successor unopposed.
- February 5–6 – The team of A. J. Foyt, Preston Henn, Bob Wollek and Claude Ballot-Léna win the 24 Hours of Daytona automobile race in a Porsche 935.
- February 10 – Dismembered sets of human remains are found at a block of flats in Muswell Hill, North London. 37-year-old civil servant Dennis Nilsen, is arrested on suspicion of murder.
- February 12 – 100 women protest in Lahore, Pakistan, against military dictator Zia-ul-Haq's proposed Law of Evidence. The women are tear-gassed, baton-charged and thrown into lock-up but are successful in repealing the law.
- February 16 – The Ash Wednesday bushfires in Victoria and South Australia claim the lives of 75 people, in one of Australia's worst bushfire disasters.
- February 18
  - The Venezuelan bolívar is devalued and exchange controls are established in an event now referred to as Black Friday by many Venezuelans (the Bolívar had been the most stable and internationally accepted currency).
  - Nellie massacre: Over 2,000 people, mostly Bangladeshi Muslims, are massacred in Assam, India, during the Assam agitation.
  - Wah Mee massacre: 13 people are killed in an attempted robbery in the Chinatown area of Seattle, United States.
- February 28 – The final episode of the TV series M*A*S*H, entitled Goodbye, Farewell and Amen, airs on CBS, to a total audience of 121.6 million.

=== March ===
- March 1 – The Balearic Islands and Madrid become Autonomous communities of Spain.
- March 5 – Australian federal election: The Labor Party led by Bob Hawke defeats the Liberal/National Coalition government led by Prime Minister Malcolm Fraser. Hawke is to be sworn in on March 11. As soon as the results become clear, Fraser resigns from the Liberal leadership; he is replaced by outgoing Minister for Industry and Commerce Andrew Peacock.
- March 9 – The 3D printer is invented by Chuck Hull.
- March 15 – Reform rabbis in the U.S. vote to affirm both patrilineal and matrilineal descent for determining Jewish identity. While Jewish tradition defines a Jew as someone with a Jewish mother, this decision by the Central Conference of American Rabbis amends this principle to mean one Jewish "parent."
- March 21 – Yamoussoukro officially becomes the Ivorian political capital after transfer from Abidjan.
- March 23 – Strategic Defense Initiative: U.S. President Ronald Reagan makes his initial proposal to develop technology to intercept enemy missiles.
- March 25 – Sweden re-establishes diplomatic ties with the Vatican after a 450-year interruption. Sweden broke off relations in 1534 in keeping with the rise of Lutheranism.
- March 29 – Germany's first elected Green Party representatives take their seats in the West German Bundestag, dressed in jeans and sweaters and accompanied by bongo drums.

=== April ===
- April 4 – The Space Shuttle Challenger is launched on its maiden voyage: STS-6.
- April 6 – The FDA approves sale of the first spermicidal sponge, "Today."
- April 11 – Spain's Seve Ballesteros won the 47th PGA Masters Tournament.
- April 15 – Tokyo Disneyland opens to the public.
- April 18
  - The 1983 United States embassy bombing in Beirut kills 63 people.
  - The Disney Channel launches in the United States.
- April 21 – John Glenn announces a presidential run.
- April 22 – A reactor shutdown due to failure of fuel rods occurs at Kursk Nuclear Power Plant, Russia.
- April 29 – Erich Honecker cancels planned goodwill visit to Bonn due to escalating nuclear tensions.

=== May ===
- May 6 – Stern magazine publishes the "Hitler Diaries" (which are later found to be forgeries).
- May 11 – Aberdeen F.C. beat Real Madrid 2–1 to win the European Cup Winners' Cup in 1983, becoming only the third Scottish side to win a European trophy.
- May 16 – Michael Jackson performs the Moonwalk for the first time while performing "Billie Jean" on the Motown 25 television special.
- May 17 – Lebanon, Israel, and the United States sign an agreement on Israeli withdrawal from Lebanon.
- May 20
  - Two separate research groups led by Robert Gallo and Luc Montagnier independently declare that a novel retrovirus may have been infecting people with HIV/AIDS, and publish their findings in the same issue of the journal Science.
  - Church Street bombing: A car bombing in Pretoria, South Africa, kills 19 people. The bomb has been planted by members of Umkhonto we Sizwe, a military wing of the African National Congress.
- May 25 – Hamburger SV defeat Juventus 1–0 in the final of the European Cup.
- May 26 – The 7.8 M_{w} Sea of Japan earthquake shakes northern Honshu with a maximum Mercalli intensity of VIII (Severe). A destructive tsunami is generated that leaves about 100 people dead.
- May 27 – Benton fireworks disaster. An explosion at an unlicensed and illegal fireworks operation near Benton, Tennessee, kills eleven and injures one. The blast is heard within a radius of 20 miles (32 km).
- May 28 – The 9th G7 summit begins at Williamsburg, Virginia, United States.

=== June ===
- June 5 – The Second Sudanese Civil War begins in Sudan.
- June 9 – Britain's Conservative government, led by Margaret Thatcher, is re-elected by a landslide majority.
- June 9–25 – The 1983 Cricket World Cup is held in England with India defeating West Indies in the final.
- June 11 – The Italian cargo ship Michelle ran aground just northwest of Dugi Otok.
- June 13
  - Pioneer 10 passes the orbit of Neptune, becoming the first human-made object to leave the vicinity of the major planets of the Solar System.
  - The first worldwide mobile telephone, the Motorola DynaTAC, enters the market.
- June 18 –
  - Iranian teenager Mona Mahmudnizhad and nine other women are hanged because they are members of the Baháʼí Faith.
  - Sally Ride becomes the first female American astronaut in space when she launches on board Challenger's STS-7 mission together with four male crewmates.
- June 18–19 – The team of Vern Schuppan, Al Holbert and Hurley Haywood wins the 24 Hours of Le Mans.
- June 22 – Emanuela Orlandi, a 15-year-old Vatican girl, mysteriously disappears in Rome while returning home from a music lesson. The disappearance of the girl led to many speculations involving international terrorism, Italian organized crime, and even a plot inside the Vatican to cover a sexual scandal inside the Holy See. Because of all these theories, the Orlandi case would later become Italy's most famous mystery.
- June 25 – India wins the Cricket World Cup, defeating the West Indies by 43 runs.
- June 30 – A total loss of coolant occurs at the Embalse Nuclear Power Station, Argentina. It is classified as an "Accident With Local Consequences" – level 4 on the International Nuclear Event Scale.

=== July ===
- July 1
  - A North Korean Ilyushin Il-62M jet, en route to Conakry Airport in Guinea, crashes into the Fouta Djall Mountains of Guinea, killing all 23 people on board.
  - A technical failure causes the release of iodine-131 from the Philippsburg Nuclear Power Plant, Germany.
- July 7 – Ten-year-old American girl Samantha Smith accepts her invitation from Soviet Premier Yuri Andropov and begins her visit to the USSR with her parents.
- July 11 – Reading Rainbow debuts on PBS.
- July 15
  - Nintendo's Family Computer, also known as the Famicom, goes on sale in Japan.
  - The Orly Airport attack in Paris leaves eight dead and 55 injured.
- July 16 – Sikorsky S-61 disaster: A helicopter crashes off the Isles of Scilly, causing 20 fatalities.
- July 20 – The government of Poland announces the end of martial law and amnesty for political prisoners.
- July 21 – The lowest temperature on Earth is recorded in Vostok Station, Antarctica with −89.2 °C (−128.6 °F).
- July 22 – Australian Dick Smith completes his solo circumnavigation of the world in a helicopter.
- July 23
  - 13 Sri Lanka Army soldiers are killed during a deadly ambush by the militant Liberation Tigers of Tamil Eelam, thus beginning the Sri Lankan Civil War, which would continue until 2009.
  - Heavy rain and mudslides in western Shimane Prefecture, Japan, kill 117.
- July 24 – The Black July anti-Tamil riots begin in Sri Lanka, killing between 400 and 3,000 Sri Lankan Tamils and Hill-country Tamils.

=== August ===
- August 4
  - Thomas Sankara becomes President of Upper Volta.
  - Bettino Craxi is sworn in as Italy's first prime minister from the Italian Socialist Party (PSI).
- August 7 – Soviet authorities pass harsher punishments for drunkenness and absenteeism, responding to public calls to curb high rates of alcoholism.
- August 18
  - Hurricane Alicia hits the Texas coast, killing 22 and causing over US$3.8 billion (2005 dollars) in damage.
  - Five people are killed and 18 others injured when a road train is deliberately driven into a motel at Ayers Rock in the Northern Territory of Australia (the driver, Douglas Edward Crabbe, is convicted in March 1984).
- August 21 – Benigno Aquino Jr., Philippines opposition leader, is assassinated in Manila just as he returns from exile.
- August 23 – In a crackdown on crime, the Chinese state executes 19 people for murder, 10 for rape, and one for auto theft. By the end of the year, Amnesty International estimates that at least 600 people have been executed in China.
- August 24 – South Africa announces "all outstanding issues" preventing independence for South West Africa (present-day Namibia) have been resolved, except for the continuing presence of 23,000 Cuban troops in neighboring Angola.
- August 26 – Heavy rain triggers flooding at Bilbao, Spain, and surrounding areas, killing 44 people and causing millions in damages.
- August 29 – Two U.S. Marines are killed by mortar blast in Beirut, marking the first U.S. combat fatalities of the Multinational Force in Lebanon.

=== September ===
- September 1 – Cold War: Korean Air Lines Flight 007 is shot down by Soviet Union Air Force Su-15 Flagon pilot Major Gennadi Osipovich near Moneron Island when the commercial aircraft enters Soviet airspace. All 269 on board are killed, including U.S. Congressman Larry McDonald.
- September 6 – The Soviet Union admits to shooting down Korean Air Lines Flight 007, stating that the pilots did not know it was a civilian aircraft when it violated Soviet airspace.
- September 19
  - Saint Kitts and Nevis becomes an independent state.
  - Press Your Luck premieres on CBS.
- September 23
  - Gulf Air Flight 771 crashes in the United Arab Emirates after a bomb explodes in the baggage compartment, killing 117.
  - Violence erupts in New Caledonia between native Kanaks and French expatriates. The French government withdraws the promise of independence.
- September 26
  - 1983 Soviet nuclear false alarm incident: Soviet military officer Stanislav Petrov averts a worldwide nuclear war by correctly identifying a warning of attack by U.S. missiles as a false alarm.
  - The Soyuz T-10-1 mission ends in a pad abort at the Baikonur Cosmodrome, when a pad fire occurs at the base of the Soyuz U rocket during the launch countdown. The escape tower system, attached to the top of the capsule containing the crew and Soyuz spacecraft, fires immediately, pulling the crew safe from the vehicle a few seconds before the rocket explodes, destroying the launch complex.
  - The mass burial of around 700,000 unsold Atari video game cartridges, consoles, and computers occurs in Alamogordo, New Mexico.
  - The Australian yacht Australia II wins the America's Cup, the first successful challenge to the New York Yacht Club's 132-year defence of the sailing trophy.
- September 27 – The GNU Project is announced publicly on the net.unix-wizards and net.usoft newsgroups.

=== October ===
- October 2 – Neil Kinnock is elected leader of the British Labour Party.
- October 4 – British entrepreneur Richard Noble sets a new land speed record of 633.468 mph (1,019.468 km/h), driving Thrust2 at the Black Rock Desert, Nevada.
- October 9 – The Rangoon bombing kills South Korea's Foreign Minister, Lee Bum Suk, and 21 others. The perpetrators are believed to be North Koreans.
- October 12 – Japan's former Prime Minister Kakuei Tanaka is found guilty of taking a $2 million bribe from Lockheed, and sentenced to 4 years in jail.
- October 13 – The world's first commercial mobile cellular telephone call is made, in Chicago, United States.
- October 19 – Maurice Bishop, Prime Minister of Grenada, and 40 others are assassinated in a military coup.
- October 21 – At the 17th General Conference on Weights and Measures, the metre is defined in terms of the speed of light as the distance light travels in a vacuum in 1/299,792,458 of a second.
- October 23 – Beirut barracks bombing: Simultaneous suicide truck-bombings destroy both the French Army and United States Marine Corps barracks in Beirut, killing 241 U.S. servicemen, 58 French paratroopers and 6 Lebanese civilians.
- October 25
  - Invasion of Grenada by United States troops at the behest of Eugenia Charles of Dominica, a member of the Organization of American States.
  - Word processor software Multi-Tool Word, soon to become Microsoft Word, is released in the United States. It is primarily the work of programmers Richard Brodie and Charles Simonyi. Free demonstration copies on disk are distributed with the November issue of PC World magazine.
- October 30 – Argentine general election: The first democratic elections in Argentina after seven years of military rule are held.

=== November ===
- November 2 – South Africa approves a new constitution granting limited political rights to Coloureds and Asians as part of a series of reforms to apartheid.
- November 3 – Commencement of the battle of Tripoli between Arafat loyalists and PLO dissidents.
- November 5 – Byford Dolphin rig diving bell accident: Off the coast of Norway, 5 divers are killed and 1 is severely wounded in an explosive decompression accident.
- November 7
  - Able Archer 83: Many Soviet officials misinterpret this NATO exercise as a nuclear first strike, causing the last nuclear scare of the Cold War.
  - 1983 U.S. Senate bombing: A bomb explodes in the United States Senate with the intent to kill Republican senators; no one is injured. The perpetrators are members of the May 19th Communist Organization.
- November 11 – Ronald Reagan becomes the first U.S. president to address the National Diet, Japan's national legislature.
- November 13 – The first United States cruise missiles arrive at RAF Greenham Common in the UK amid protests from peace campaigners.
- November 14 – The immunosuppressant cyclosporine is approved by the FDA, leading to a revolution in the field of transplantation.
- November 15 – The Turkish part of Cyprus declares independence.
- November 17 – The Zapatista Army of National Liberation is founded in Mexico.
- November 19 – An attempted hijacking of Aeroflot Flight 6833 in Soviet Georgia results in several dead and wounded.
- November 27 – Colombian Avianca Flight 011 crashes near Barajas Airport in Madrid, Spain, killing 181 of the 192 on board.

=== December ===
- December 4
  - General elections are celebrated in Venezuela in which the opposition party, Democratic Action, wins a majority in both chambers of the Venezuelan Congress and the presidency for the 1984–1989 period under Jaime Lusinchi. Voter turnout is 87.3% and Lusinchi obtains 58.4% of the votes.
  - Solar eclipse of December 4, 1983.
- December 5 – ICIMOD is established and inaugurated with its headquarters in Kathmandu, Nepal, and legitimised through an Act of Parliament in Nepal this same year.
- December 7 – Two Spanish passenger planes collide on the foggy runway at a Madrid airport, killing 93 people.
- December 9 – The Australian dollar is floated by Federal treasurer Paul Keating. Under the old flexible peg system, the Reserve Bank bought and sold all Australian dollars and cleared the market at the end of the day. This initiative is taken by the government of Bob Hawke.
- December 10 – Military rule ends and democracy is restored in Argentina, with the beginning of Raúl Alfonsín's first term as President of Argentina.
- December 13 – Turgut Özal, of ANAP forms the new government of Turkey (45th government); beginning a new civilian regime.
- December 17
  - The Alcalá 20 nightclub fire in Madrid, Spain, injuring 47 and killing 83 people.
  - Harrods bombings: a Provisional IRA car bomb kills 6 people and injures 90 outside Harrods department store in London.
- December 19 – The Jules Rimet Trophy is stolen from the Brazilian Soccer Confederation building in Rio de Janeiro. As of 2025, the trophy has not been recovered.
- December 27 – Pope John Paul II visits Rebibbia prison to forgive his would-be assassin Mehmet Ali Ağca.
- December 31 – Two bombs explode in France: one on a Paris train kills three and injures 19; the other at Marseille station kills two and injures 34.

=== Date unknown ===
- Leopold Kohr, the people of Belau, Amory and Hunter Lovins/Rocky Mountain Institute and Manfred Max Neef/CEPAUR win the Right Livelihood Award.
- The meteorological 1982–83 El Niño event causes severe weather worldwide.

== Nobel Prizes ==

- Physics – Subrahmanyan Chandrasekhar, William Alfred Fowler
- Chemistry – Henry Taube
- Medicine – Barbara McClintock
- Literature – William Golding
- Peace – Lech Wałęsa
- Economics – Gérard Debreu
