= Xu Yongyue =

Chinese politician and Minister of State Security

- 许永跃
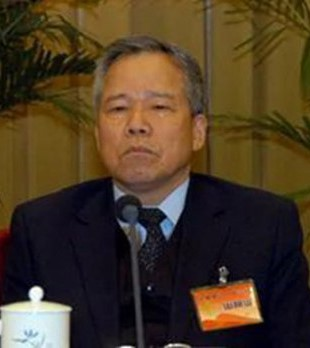
- Xu as of State Security

Minister of State Security
- In office 1 March 1998 – 1 August 2007
- Premier: Zhu Rongji; Wen Jiabao
- Preceded by: Jia Chunwang
- Succeeded by: Geng Huichang

Personal details
- Born: July 1942 (age 83–84) Zhenping County, Nanyang, Henan, Republic of China
- Party: Chinese Communist Party
- Education: Beijing People's Public Security School; Beijing No. 8 High School
- Nickname: "Xu Moumou" (pseudonym)
- Central institution membership: 15th, 16th CCP Central Committee; 11th National People's Congress

Xu Yongyue (Chinese: 许永跃; pinyin: Xǔ Yǒngyuè; born July 1942) is a retired Chinese intelligence officer who served as the second Minister of State Security (MSS) from March 1998 to August 2007. A princeling born to Communist Party (CCP) elite, Xu rose to prominence after serving over a decade as private secretary (mishu) to Chen Yun, the most senior of the Eight Elders and the leading hard-liner of late 20th century China. After nine years as Minister of State Security, Xu's career ended unceremoniously in 2007 amid a number of scandals, most prominently a sex scandal which ensnared several senior party officials. The tightening of Sino-Russian intelligence cooperation is regarded as his most notable contribution. He has been accused of corruption, and involvement in human rights abuses including directing the persecution of religious minorities, extrajudicial killings, and executions of prisoners of conscience by organ harvesting.

== Early life and education ==
Xu was born in July 1942 in Zhenping County, Nanyang, Henan. Xu has been described as a princeling or "second generation red", his father, Xu Mingzhen (born 1925), was a student in the economics department at Dade College in Hong Kong at the time of the establishment of the Chinese Communist Party (CCP). Xu Mingzhen left Hong Kong for Beijing to participate in the Cultural Revolution, and made a career for himself in the ranks of the CCP, serving abroad including in the Soviet Union working on military industrial projects in Kazakhstan.

In the early 1990s, the elder Xu served as a prominent PRC emissary in cross-strait peace talks. In August 1992, he reportedly traveled to Taiwan and met with Taiwanese President Lee Teng-hui, making what CCP press described as "important contributions to the preparation" of the Wang–Koo summit.

When Xu graduated from Beijing No. 8 High School in 1960, he reportedly performed poorly on college entry exams, and sought to use his father's influence in People's Liberation Army defense industrial projects in Kazakhstan to gain acceptance to university, a common practice for children of high Communist Party officials at the time, known as an "internal arrangement." His father refused, so Xu elected to study at the Beijing People's Public Security School (now the People's Public Security University of China) becoming a police officer at the headquarters of the Ministry of Public Security.

After graduating college, he was accepted as a full member of the CCP in 1972, remaining at the Public Security School as secretary of the General Office until 1977, likely tasked with investigating the political loyalty of employees and making decisions on personnel.

== Political career ==
In 1977, one year after the Cultural Revolution ended, Hu Qiaomu, a secretary of Mao Zedong, became the president of the Chinese Academy of Sciences. He recruited Xu Yongyue and a Renmin University student named Zhu Jiamu to serve in the Academy's General Office, with Zhu becoming Hu's secretary, and Xu serving as the director of a division beneath him.

=== Chen Yun confidant ===
In 1980, Zhu Jiamu moved to the CCP Central Commission for Discipline Inspection, becoming the secretary of hardline Party Elder and vice chairman of the CCP Central Committee Chen Yun. In 1983, Chen sought an additional secretary, and Zhu recommended Xu Yongyue. In 1985, Xu took over Zhu's position as Chen Yun's 'private secretary', a close confidant also known as a mishu. Sinologist Alexander Gabuev argued in Kommersant that despite his prominent family connections, Xu owed his career rise to this 11-year relationship with Chen.

=== 1989 Tiananmen Square massacre ===
In 1987, Xu was promoted to deputy secretary-general of the Central Advisory Committee, becoming trusted among senior communist party officials. In 2015, Hong Kong pro-democracy political party "The Frontier" revealed that on the eve of 1989 Tiananmen Square massacre, when Jiang Zemin was transferred to Beijing before becoming general secretary, Xu was the person who greeted Jiang at the airport. After Jiang became general secretary, he "reused and strongly recommended" Xu.

=== Hebei provincial official ===
In 1992, Xu became the head of the Political and Legal Committee of the CCP in Hebei Province. When Chen Yun died in 1994, Xu became Deputy Secretary of the Communist Party Committee of Hebei, serving until his promotion in March 1998.

==== Role in wrongful execution of Nie Shubin ====
In 1994, police officers in the Hebei suburb of Shijiazhuang found a highly decomposed female corpse in a cornfield between Shijiazhuang Hydraulic Parts Factory and Kongzhai Village. Near the corpse police found a bicycle, a dress and underwear. After on-the-spot investigation, the police determined that this was a road rape and murder case. 20 year old Nie Shubin was one of the first bicyclists to pass by the area after police discovered the scene. He was arrested on the spot.

In an extremely short surprise trial characteristic of the "Strike Hard" campaigns of the era, Nie was charged on April 20, 1995, arraigned on the 22nd, convicted on the 25th, issued a death warrant on the 26th, and executed by firing squad on the 27th. On the 28th, Nie's father went to the detention center to deliver daily necessities for his son as usual, when the staff told him, "don't come again, your son was executed yesterday."

At the time, an official in the Hebei procuratorate raised an objection, believing that beyond the (likely forced) confession, there was no other evidence of Nie's guilt, and demanded that the sentence be changed. Reportedly it was Xu Yongyue as secretary of the Hebei Political and Legal Committee, who ordered security officials "to kill, and to kill quickly."

In 2005, convicted murderer Wang Shujin confessed to the "1994 rape and murder case in a cornfield in the western suburbs of Shijiazhuang", and a team of investigators from the Hebei Province High People's Court began to review Nie's conviction. Xu Yongyue, by then Minister of State Security, reportedly came forward and made great efforts to obstruct the investigation, leaning on former colleagues in Hebei and other senior MSS officials. Hebei provincial authorities attempted to strongarm Wang Shujin to revise his confession, including under threat of torture.

In 2015, the Hebei Province High People's Court, which upheld Nie’s murder conviction in 1995 (clearing the way for his execution), expressed "sincere apologies" to his parents on Weibo, and vacated his criminal conviction. The parents were awarded 2.68 million yuan by the Chinese government in 2017 after the Supreme People's Court announced Nie's innocence in December 2016.

== Minister of State Security ==
Xu was appointed Minister of State Security in March 1998.

Xu was an alternate of the 15th Central Committee of the Chinese Communist Party and a full member of the 16th Central Committee of the Chinese Communist Party.

=== Sino-Russian intelligence cooperation ===
During his leadership of the MSS, he improved and expanded the already close collaboration with the Russian security and intelligence services begun by his predecessor, Jia Chunwang. While during the 1980s the MSS had collaborated with the United States against the Soviet Union (notably in Afghanistan), China and Russia drew closer following the end of the Cold War. The security ties between the two countries eventually led to the establishment of the Shanghai Cooperation Organisation in 2001. After Vladimir Putin came to power in Russia, the collaboration in the intelligence and security fields grew to a strategic partnership.

=== Sex scandal and forced retirement ===
Following a sex scandal which ensnared several senior MSS and high communist party officials, Xu was given a forced retirement in August 2007 by Hu Jintao. His sentence was lenient, while others in the case were given suspended death sentences, Communist Party media reported that Xu's status as a princeling ensured that while he was "severely punished by the law" for the "tremendous political loss" of being seduced by unscrupulous businessmen, he was spared the harshest punishments.

== Post-retirement activity ==
In March 2008, he was elected a member of the Standing Committee of the 11th National People's Congress, and appointed Vice Chairman of the Committee on Constitution and Law.

Preceded by Jia Chunwang	Minister of State Security; 1998–2007	Succeeded by Geng Huichang
