= Education and Rectification of the Political and Legal Teams =

Chinese Communist Party campaign

- Simplified Chinese: 政法队伍教育整顿
- Traditional Chinese: 政法隊伍教育整頓
Transcriptions
Standard Mandarin
- Hanyu Pinyin: Zhèngfǎ Duìwǔ Jiàoyù Zhěngdùn

Alternative Chinese name
- Chinese: 政法整风
- Traditional Chinese: 政法整風
Transcriptions
Standard Mandarin
- Hanyu Pinyin: Zhèngfǎ Zhěngfēng

The Education and Rectification of the Political and Legal Teams was a campaign launched by the Chinese Communist Party (CCP) in February 2021 that lasted until January 2022. Its purpose was to rectify the political and legal system after problems found in the Special Campaign to Crack Down on Organized Crime and Eliminate Evil.

On July 8, 2020, the CCP's Central Political and Legal Affairs Commission held a mobilization meeting for the pilot work of the National Political and Legal Team Education and Rectification, and carried out preliminary site selection and trial. On February 27, 2021, at the National Political and Legal Team Education and Rectification Mobilization and Deployment Meeting, the national political and legal team education and rectification was mobilized and deployed, and officially announced that the campaign had been launched nationwide.

== Background ==
The three-year Special Campaign to Crack Down on Organized Crime and Eliminate Evil, which was implemented lasted from 2018 to 2021, led to major cases such as the Sun Xiaoguo case and the Xinhuang No. 1 Middle School playground burial case. In addition, judicial corruption cases such as political and legal officials acting as umbrellas for criminal gangs, illegally reducing sentences and granting parole, and "paying money to get out of prison" were found to be common. The problems exposed in the political and legal system far exceeded the expectations of the central leadership, leading to an emergency campaign to educate and rectify the political and legal team nationwide.

== Early stages ==
On 8 July 2020, Chen Yixin, Secretary-General of the Central Political and Legal Affairs Commission, announced a two-year education and rectification of the political and legal teams campaign to purge "corrupt elements" in the justice system and remove "two-faced officials", who only pay lip service to CCP orders and rules. Calling it a "a self-initiated revolution by the security system", he compared the campaign to Mao Zedong's Yan'an Rectification Movement. The campaign was announced to initially start with a three-month pilot scheme in five cities and four counties in Heilongjiang, Jiangsu, Shaanxi, Sichuan and Henan, and go nationwide in 2021, lasting until the first quarter of 2022.

=== Pilot stage ===
The Central Political and Legal Affairs Commission decided to designate five municipal-level and four county (city, district)-level political and legal units and two prisons as pilot units to carry out the nationwide political and legal team education and rectification pilot work from July to October 2020:

- The courts, procuratorates, public security and judicial administrative organs of Harbin City (at the same level) and Hulan District, Heilongjiang Province
- The courts, procuratorates, public security and judicial administrative organs of Xuzhou City (at the same level) and Yunlong District, Jiangsu Province. The first on-site guidance group leader of the National Political and Legal Team Education and Rectification Pilot Project was Dong Wenpu (deputy director of the Political Department of the Supreme People's Court), and the deputy group leaders were Ni Chunqing (Director of the Political Department of the Jiangsu Provincial Committee of the Chinese Communist Party's Political and Legal Affairs Commission), Chen Ritao (Director of the Organization and Publicity Department of the Party Committee of the Supreme People's Court), Zhou Tao (deputy director of the Team Building Bureau of the Central Political and Legal Affairs Commission), etc.
- The courts, procuratorates, public security and judicial administrative organs of Sanmenxia City (at the same level) and Lingbao City, Henan Province
- The courts, procuratorates, public security and judicial administrative organs of Yibin City (at the same level) and Gong County, Sichuan Province
- Baoji City National Security Agency, Shaanxi Province
- Heilongjiang Province Hulan Prison
- Heilongjiang Province Songbin Prison

Based on the experience gained from the pilot program from July to October 2020, the education and rectification work of the political and legal team will be rolled out from the bottom up, level by level, throughout the national political and legal system from 2021 onwards; by the first quarter of 2022, the education and rectification task of the national political and legal team would be completed.

==== Results ====
Soon after the pilot program began, a number of political and legal officials were dismissed in various pilot locations. At least 20 police officers in Harbin, including Ma Weimin, secretary of the Party Committee of the Harbin Municipal Public Security Bureau, were subject to disciplinary review and supervisory investigation.

On December 1, 2020, the Central Political and Legal Affairs Commission held a summary meeting on the pilot work of the national political and legal team education and rectification, announcing that the pilot work of the political and legal team education and rectification had been successfully completed. The summary meeting stated that the national political and legal team education and rectification pilot work, which lasted for 5 months, had ended. In the past 5 months, 2,247 political and legal police officers were punished in the pilot areas, accounting for 14% of the total number of police officers; 448 people were investigated and investigated; and 39 people were transferred to judicial organs. 1,380 police officers took the initiative to explain their violations of discipline and law to the organization. A number of cases of "not filing cases, suppressing cases without investigation, and delaying cases for a long time" were investigated and rectified. 117 people were investigated and punished for violating the "three regulations" to prevent interference in the judiciary. 238 police officers who violated the regulations on business and business operations, and participated in equity and lending were investigated and punished. 16 people who violated the regulations on serving as lawyers and legal consultants were investigated and rectified. The two pilot prisons of Huluan and Songbin and the five provincial prisons in Yibin City investigated more than 80,000 cases of commutation of sentence, parole and temporary release from prison, and confirmed and rectified 307 violations of regulations and laws.

== Launch ==
On February 27, 2021, the National Political and Legal Team Education and Rectification Mobilization and Deployment Meeting was held in Beijing. In accordance with the requirements of the "Opinions of the CPC Central Committee on Carrying out the National Political and Legal Team Education and Rectification", the national political and legal team education and rectification was mobilized and deployed. The campaign was officially launched nationwide, and a national political and legal team education and rectification leading group was established, with Guo Shengkun, secretary of the Central Political and Legal Affairs Commission, as the group leader, and the office being located in the Central Political and Legal Affairs Commission. During the education and rectification period, the national political and legal team education and rectification leading group sent a central supervision group to various places for supervision. The leaders of the provincial and deputy ministerial level served as the group leader and deputy group leader respectively, with the focus on setting the direction; the province, autonomous region, municipality and Xinjiang Production and Construction Corps party committees also sent guidance groups. 31 provinces, autonomous regions, municipalities and the Xinjiang Production and Construction Corps immediately established high-level leading groups to effectively shoulder the main responsibility and the primary responsibility of the party committee secretary.

The main responsible cadres of the discipline inspection and supervision and organization departments of most places served as deputy group leaders. After this period, various places also held relevant meetings to promote the campaign. In April 2021, the National Political and Legal Team Education and Rectification Leading Group held a meeting, which reviewed the work plan of the first batch of national political and legal team education and rectification central supervision groups, opinions on the application of the policy of "leniency for self-inspection and strictness for inspection" during the national political and legal team education and rectification period, and other documents. On June 7, 2021, the National Education and Rectification Office launched a comprehensive review of "illegal parole and sentence reduction cases" in various places over the past 30 years as an important project of the political and legal team education and rectification campaign.

=== Organization ===
The National Political and Legal Team Education and Rectification Leading Group, with its office located in the Central Political and Legal Affairs Commission, was established to organize and lead, coordinate and promote the education and rectification work of the national political and legal team, study and propose policies and measures for the education and rectification of the political and legal team, and coordinate the resolution of major issues and problems encountered in the education and rectification of the political and legal team.

- Team Leader
  - Guo Shengkun (Secretary of the Central Political and Legal Affairs Commission)
- Deputy Group Leader
  - Zhou Qiang (President of the Supreme People's Court)
  - Zhang Jun (Procurator-General of the Supreme People's Procuratorate)
  - Yu Hongqiu (Deputy Secretary of the Central Commission for Discipline Inspection, deputy director of the National Supervisory Commission)
  - Fu Xingguo (Director of the State Administration of Civil Service)
  - Chen Yixin (Secretary-General of the Central Political and Legal Affairs Commission)
  - Chen Wenqing (Minister of State Security)
  - Tang Yijun (Minister of Justice)

The National Office for the Education and Rectification of the Political and Legal Team was the office of the National Leading Group for the Education and Rectification of the Political and Legal Team. At the same time, the National Leading Group for the Education and Rectification of the Political and Legal Team also had 16 central supervision groups under its jurisdiction, with ministerial and deputy ministerial-level leading cadres serving as group leaders and deputy group leaders respectively. The team included:

- Deputy Head and Office Director of the National Political and Legal Team Education and Rectification Leading Group: Chen Yixin
- Deputy Directors of the National Office for the Education and Rectification of the Political and Legal Team: Fu Xingguo, Jing Hanchao, Bai Shaokang, Wang Hongxiang, Ma Shizhong, Pan Yiqun, Nie Furu, Guo Wenqi

=== Phase I ===
On June 10, 2021, the first press conference on the national political and legal team education and rectification was held. At the conference, it was revealed that since the launch of the political and legal team education and rectification campaign, 12,576 police officers across China have surrendered to the Commission for Discipline Inspection and Supervision. During the first batch of political and legal team education and rectification and the "review", nearly 20,000 political and legal police officers across China voluntarily surrendered to the Commission for Discipline Inspection and Supervision, 49,163 police officers were investigated, 2,875 were detained, and 178,431 police officers were punished. On August 16, the mobilization and deployment meeting for the second batch of political and legal team education and rectification was held in Beijing.

=== Phase II ===
On August 16, 2021, the National Second Batch of Political and Legal Team Education and Rectification Mobilization and Deployment Meeting was held in Beijing. The meeting announced that the National Second Batch of Education and Rectification would be officially launched from mid-August, and the National Political and Legal Team Education and Rectification Movement would enter the second phase. The main targets of the second phase were the Central Political and Legal Commission, central political and legal units, and provincial party committee political and legal commissions and political and legal units, and the time period was about 3 months.

As of September 14, 16 central supervision groups were stationed in various provinces, autonomous regions and municipalities to supervise provincial-level political and legal organs, and another three central political and legal organ supervision groups have also been stationed in six central political and legal units, including the Central Political and Legal Commission, the Ministry of Public Security, the Supreme People's Court, the Supreme People's Procuratorate, the Ministry of State Security, and the Ministry of Justice. Among them, the first central political and legal organ supervision group was headed by Zhang Xuan, Chairman of the Chongqing Municipal People's Congress Standing Committee, and supervised the Central Political and Legal Commission and the Ministry of Public Security; the second central political and legal organ supervision group was headed by Ouyang Jian, Chairman of the Gansu Provincial Committee of the Chinese People's Political Consultative Conference, and supervised the Supreme People's Court and the Supreme People's Procuratorate; the third central political and legal organ supervision group was headed by Li Wei, Chairman of the Beijing Municipal People's Congress Standing Committee, and supervised the Ministry of State Security and the Ministry of Justice.

=== Conclusion ===
On January 16, 2022, the National Political and Legal Team Education and Rectification Summary Meeting was held in the form of a video conference. Guo Shengkun stressed at the meeting that "we must take Xi Jinping Thought on Socialism with Chinese Characteristics for a New Era as our guide, strengthen the "four consciousnesses", strengthen the "four confidences", and achieve the "two safeguards", summarize and consolidate the results of the political and legal team education and rectification, promote the regularization and institutionalization of comprehensive and strict management of the Party and the police, forge a loyal, clean and responsible political and legal iron army, and better shoulder the responsibilities and missions entrusted by the Party and the people in the new era and new journey".
