= Nie Shubin =

Chinese man wrongfully executed for murder

- 聂树斌
- Nie Shubin around the time of his arrest
- Born: November 6, 1974; Xianiezhuang Village, Huolu County, Shijiazhuang District, Hebei Province, China
- Died: April 27, 1995 (aged 20); Shijiazhuang City, Hebei Province, China
- Cause of death: Execution by shooting
- Status: Exonerated
- Criminal charges: Intentional homicide, Rape
- Penalty: Death penalty

Details
- Date apprehended: October 9, 1994

Nie Shubin (Chinese: 聂树斌; pinyin: Niè Shùbīn; November 6, 1974 – April 27, 1995) was a Chinese man wrongfully executed for a rape and murder in the Hebei capital, Shijiazhuang. He is one of the most famous wrongful executions in the history of the People's Republic of China, and considered an example of injustice in the Communist Chinese legal system from the "Strike Hard" era.

== Trial and execution ==
In 1994, police in Shijiazhuang found the decomposed corpse of Kang Juhua (康菊花; Kāng Júhuā), a woman in her thirties, in a cornfield between the Shijiazhuang Hydraulic Parts Factory and Kongzhai Village. Near the corpse police found a bicycle, a dress and underwear. After a brief on-the-spot investigation, the police determined that this was a road rape and murder case. 20 year old Nie Shubin was one of the first bicyclists to pass by the area after police discovered the scene. He was arrested on the spot.

In an extremely short surprise trial characteristic of the "Strike Hard" campaigns of the era, Nie was charged on April 20, 1995, arraigned on the 22nd, convicted on the 25th, issued a death warrant on the 26th, and executed by shooting on the 27th. On the 28th, Nie's father went to the detention center to deliver daily necessities for his son as usual, when the staff told him, "don't come again, your son was executed yesterday."

At the time, an official in the Hebei procuratorate raised an objection, believing that beyond the (likely forced) confession, there was no other evidence of Nie's guilt, and demanded that the sentence be changed. Reportedly it was Xu Yongyue (许永跃; Xǔ Yǒngyuè) as secretary of the Hebei Political and Legal Committee, who ordered security officials to "kill him, and kill him quickly."

== Exoneration and new suspect ==
In 2005, convicted murderer Wang Shujin (王书金; Wáng Shūjīn) confessed to the police that he had committed the murder, and a team of investigators from the Hebei Province High People's Court began to review Nie's conviction. Xu Yongyue, by then Minister of State Security, reportedly came forward and made great efforts to obstruct the investigation, leaning on former colleagues in Hebei and other senior MSS officials. Hebei provincial authorities attempted to strongarm Wang Shujin to revise his confession, including under threat of torture.

In 2015, the Hebei Province High People's Court, which upheld Nie’s murder conviction in 1995 (clearing the way for his execution), expressed "sincere apologies" to his parents on Weibo, and vacated his criminal conviction. The parents were awarded ¥2.68 million Renminbi ($396,520 USD) by the Chinese government in 2017 after the Supreme People's Court announced Nie's innocence in December 2016.

On February 2, 2021, Wang was executed for the murders originally attributed to Nie.

== Legacy ==
Nie Shubin's case reportedly influenced the Chinese government to introduce requirements mandating all police interrogations be video recorded.
