= Chen Yixin =

Chinese politician

- 陈一新
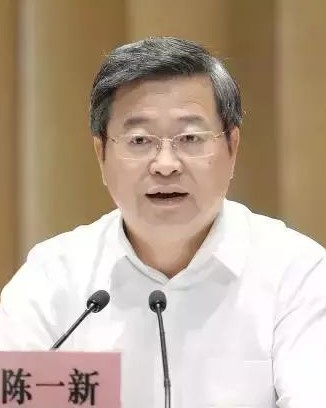
- Chen in 2021

6th Minister of State Security
- Incumbent
- Assumed office 30 October 2022
- Premier: Li Keqiang; Li Qiang
- Preceded by: Chen Wenqing

Secretary-General of Central Political and Legal Affairs Commission
- In office March 2018 – March 2023
- Secretary: Guo Shengkun; Chen Wenqing
- Preceded by: Wang Yongqing
- Succeeded by: Yin Bai

Party Secretary of Wuhan
- In office 3 January 2017 – 20 March 2018
- Preceded by: Ruan Chengfa
- Succeeded by: Ma Guoqiang

Party Secretary of Wenzhou
- In office 26 June 2013 – 1 December 2015
- Preceded by: Chen Derong
- Succeeded by: Xu Liyi

Party Secretary of Jinhua
- In office 8 January 2012 – 26 June 2013
- Preceded by: Xu Zhiping
- Succeeded by: Xu Jia'ai

Personal details
- Born: 1 September 1959 (age 67) Taishun County, Zhejiang, China
- Party: Chinese Communist Party
- Education: Lishui Teacher's College; Zhejiang Provincial Party School

Chen Yixin (Chinese: 陈一新; born 1 September 1959) is a Chinese politician who is the current Minister of State Security.

Born in Taishun County, Zhejiang, Chen gained political prominence working in his home province. In 2015, he was appointed as the deputy director of the Office of the Central Leading Group for Comprehensively Deepening Reforms, working there until 2016. In 2017, he became the Communist Party Secretary of Wuhan, working in that capacity until 2018.

In 2018, he was appointed as the Secretary-General of the Central Political and Legal Affairs Commission. As Secretary-General, Chen oversaw the Special Campaign to Crack Down on Organized Crime and Eliminate Evil from 2018 to 2020, and the campaign to educate and rectify the political and legal teams from 2020 to 2022. He was appointed as the Minister of State Security in 2022.

== Early life and education ==
Chen was born in Taishun County, Zhejiang. He graduated with a degree in physics from Lishui Teacher's College (now Lishui University), where he served as a leader in the school's Communist Youth League.

== Political career ==
He has served as deputy Secretary-General of Zhejiang Party Committee. In 2012 he became party secretary of Jinhua. On 3 January 2013, he became Communist Party Secretary of Wenzhou, a post which he served until 1 December 2015. Between December 2014 and December 2015, Chen was also a member of the Zhejiang Communist Party Standing Committee.

Chen later became the deputy director of the Office of the Central Leading Group for Comprehensively Deepening Reforms in 2015 until 2016. On 26 June 2017, Chen was appointed as the Communist Party Secretary of Wuhan, a position he held until 20 March 2018, as well as deputy party secretary of Hubei.

=== Central Political and Legal Affairs Commission ===
In March 2018, Chen Yixin succeeded Wang Yongqing as the Secretary-General of the Central Political and Legal Affairs Commission (CPLAC). Starting from May 2018, became the secretary-general of the National Leading Group of the Special Campaign to Crack Down on Organized Crime and Eliminate Evil. In August 2018, Chen Yixin presided over the second meeting of the Leading Group, where he said the campaign would enter a more difficult period and called for strengthening cooperation between the CCDI and legal organizations.

In February 2020, Chen was announced to be the deputy head of the central government's directing group on Hubei, leading efforts related to the COVID-19 pandemic in the province, assisting Vice Premier Sun Chunlan. On 8 July 2020, Chen announced a two-year campaign to educate and rectify the political and legal teams to purge "corrupt elements" in the justice system and remove "two-faced officials", who only pay lip service to CCP orders and rules. Calling it a "a self-initiated revolution by the security system", he compared the campaign to Mao Zedong's Yan'an Rectification Movement. The campaign was announced to initially start with a three-month pilot scheme in five cities and four counties in Heilongjiang, Jiangsu, Shaanxi, Sichuan and Henan, and go nationwide in 2021, lasting until the first quarter of 2022.

== Minister of State Security ==
On 30 October 2022, Chen was officially appointed by the Standing Committee of the National People's Congress as the minister of state security, succeeding Chen Wenqing. He was succeeded by Yin Bai as the Secretary-General of the CPLAC in March 2023.

Under Chen's tenure, the long-secretive Ministry of State Security (MSS) opened a WeChat account in July 2023. In the first anniversary of the account, Chen called the social media work of the MSS as being a "project of paramount importance", and said that officials must be "good at transforming the mysterious, miraculous and divine nature of national-security work into strengths in communication, penetration and influence".

In December 2025, Chen wrote an article at the Study Times, where he said "unipolar hegemony" was becoming "increasingly unsustainable", but warned that "unilateralism and protectionism and the threats of hegemonism and power politics are increasing on the rise". He also warned "various hostile forces have never relaxed their strategies of Westernization and division", and said that the MSS would "crush all separatist activities aimed at Taiwan independence", while calling for a "counter-espionage campaign with special attention for critical national technological assets".

In September 2026, Chen wrote an article at the China Cyberspace, where he said that "hostile forces and individuals with ulterior motives" were using artificial intelligence to wage a "propaganda war and a cognitive war against us, directly threatening our political security, institutional security, and ideological security". He cited Anthropic's Claude Mythos and OpenAI's GPT-5.5-Cyber as possible risks. He also called for greater Party oversight over AI.

Government offices
Preceded by Chen Wenqing	Minister of State Security; 30 October 2022 – present	Succeeded by Incumbent
Preceded by Ruan Chengfa	Communist Party Secretary of Wuhan; 26 June 2017 – 20 March 2018	Succeeded by Ma Guoqiang
Preceded by Chen Derong	Communist Party Secretary of Wenzhou; 3 January 2013 – 1 December 2015	Succeeded by Xu Liyi
