= Special Campaign to Crack Down on Organized Crime and Eliminate Evil =

Chinese Communist Party campaign

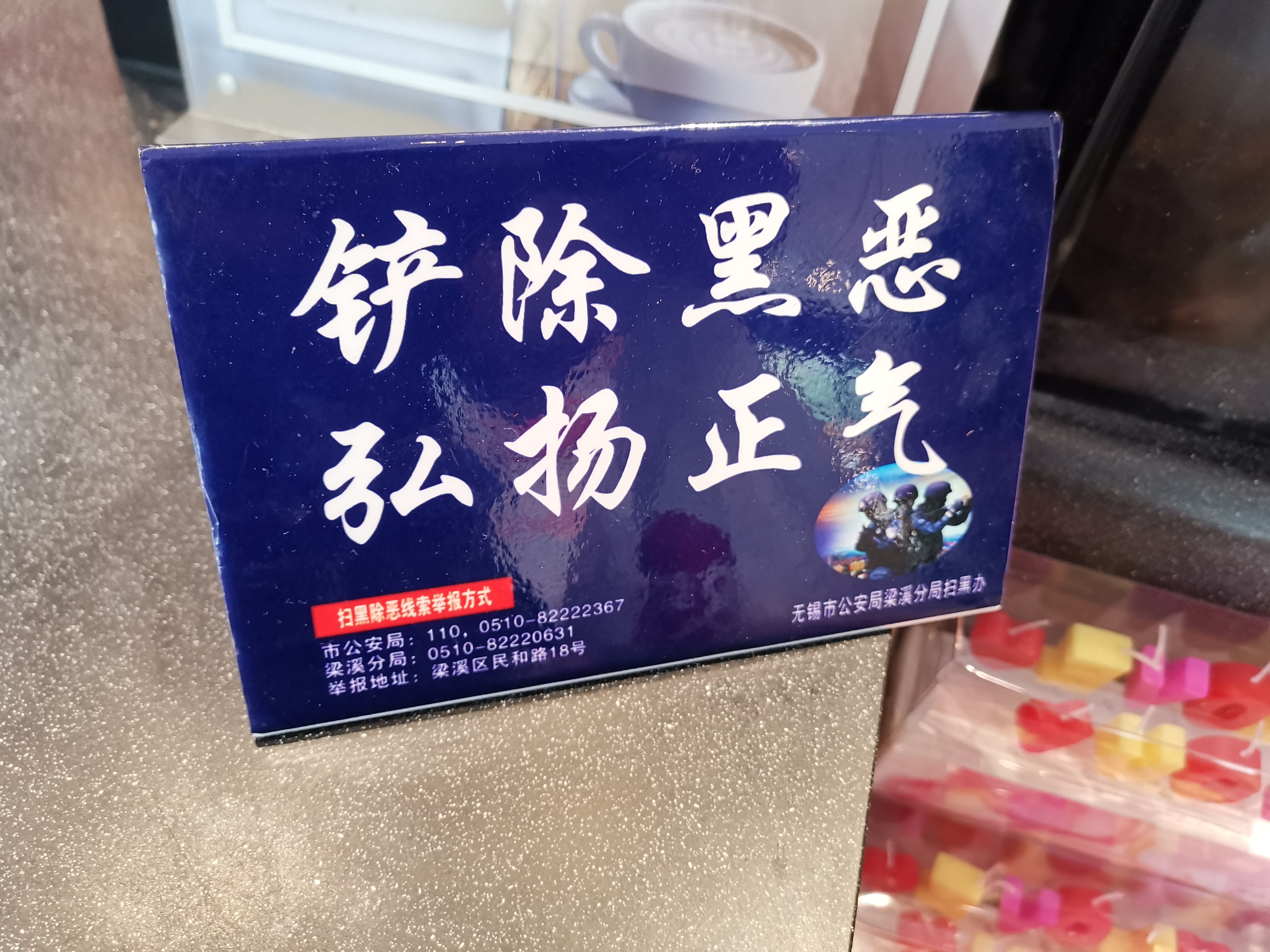
- A propaganda sign for cracking down on gangsters and eliminating evil in a shopping mall in Wuxi, Jiangsu
- Simplified Chinese: 扫黑除恶专项斗争
- Traditional Chinese: 掃黑除惡專案鬥爭
Transcriptions
Standard Mandarin
- Hanyu Pinyin: Sǎohēi Chúè Zhuānxiàng Dòuzhēng

The Special Campaign to Crack Down on Organized Crime and Eliminate Evil was a campaign launched by the Chinese Communist Party (CCP) to crack down on organized crime. The campaign was launched on 24 January 2018, with a target period of three years.

== History ==
The campaign was announced on 24 January 2018 jointly by the General Office of the CCP Central Committee and the State Council in the "Notice Regarding the Launch of the Special Campaign to Crack Down on Organized Crime and Eliminate Evil", which also called for "opposing corruption and graft at the grassroots level". The National Leading Small Group for the campaign was formed in May 2018. Its members included:

- Zhao Kezhi
- Zhou Qiang
- Qi Yu
- Chen Yixin

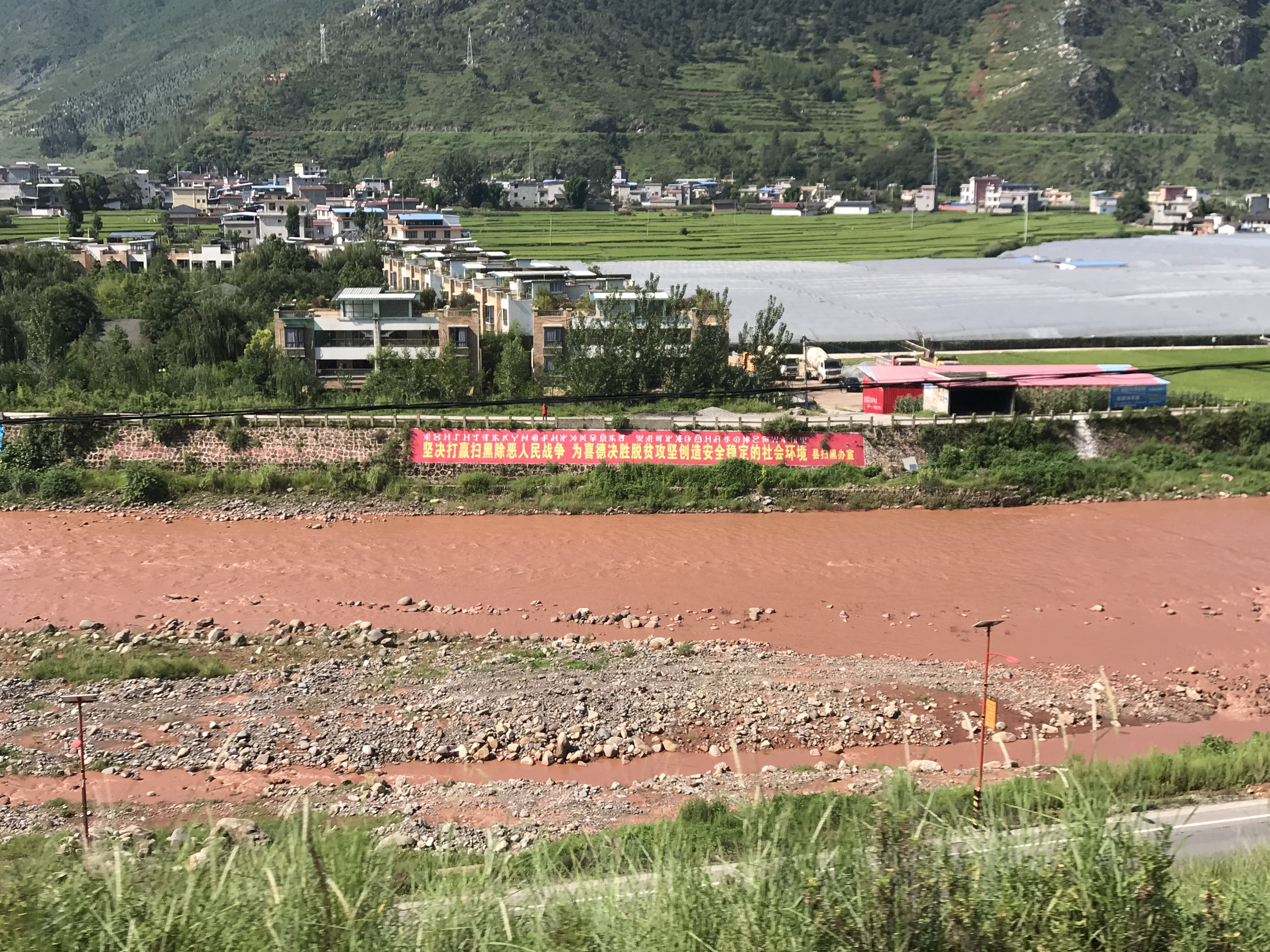
A banner promoting the campaign in Xide County, Liangshan Yi Autonomous Prefecture

In April 2020, the National Leading Group launched the "Six Clearances" campaign. On 29 March 2021, the National Summary and Commendation Conference on the Special Campaign to Crack Down on Organized Crime and Eliminate Evil was held in Beijing, where CCP General Secretary Xi Jinping gave rewards to representatives. Due to problems exposed in the Special Campaign, the CCP announced the Education and Rectification of the Political and Legal Teams campaign in July 2020. In December 2021, the Standing Committee of the National People's Congress adopted the Anti-organized Crime Law of the People's Republic of China, which took effect on 1 May 2022.

== Details ==
The campaign differed from previous efforts to fight organized crime by paying special attention to ways organized crime had internal influence in law enforcement organizations. Organized crime was important to General Office of the CCP because in addition for hurting personal finances it erodes the legitimacy and authority of the Chinese Communist Party when it gains internal access to the state organs. In particular the campaign fought protection umbrellas 保护伞 in which officials made it more difficult to prosecute organized crime via internal influences like intentionally misclassifying cases or leaking investigative details. The campaign came with new reporting systems, rewards, and legal protections for whistleblowers. The government reported that by July 2019, 300,000 citizens' reports were filed and 15 million ren men bi was paid to whistleblowers. It also reported that 180,000 turned themselves in during the same time period. In March 2019, a work reported stated 10,361 persons were prosecuted for organized criminal activity, 50,827 persons were prosecuted for other criminal activity, and 350 persons were prosecuted for providing protection umbrellas. In May 2020 an additional work report stated 30,547 additional prosecutions for organized crime, 67,689 prosecutions for other criminal activity, and 1,385 persons prosecuted for providing protection umbrellas. The Central Commission for Discipline Inspection (CCDI) also investigated party members.

Some foreign observers critiqued the quick speed of the campaign and opaque targeting policies. The CCDI also advised making stricter targeting policies in 2019.

== Propaganda ==
In propaganda, the campaign was presented as both against organized crime and against criminals' important links to corrupt officials. The campaign used the term 扫 or sweep rather than 打 or strike. This may reflect a shifting priority from the Chinese government from going after the most overt forms of criminal activity to better concealed organized crime. In October 2018, Chen Hongzhi, an alleged Shanxi gangster was made an into an example on state media. State media reported that the leader of the local government 陈子福, a local party member 张香平, and police chief 高建斌 had worked together to prevent his prosecution. After arrest, state media reported that RMB 7.8 billion was recovered. Reporting highlighted cases where local investigations were remanded by the Central Supervision Group to broaden the scope of investigation into additional officials and uncover more corruption and seize more assets.

== See also ==
- Triad (organized crime)
