= Anti-organized Crime Law of the People's Republic of China =

Standing Committee of the National People's Congress
- Passed by: Standing Committee of the National People's Congress
- Passed: 24 December 2021
- Signed by: President Xi Jinping
- Signed: 24 December 2021
- Commenced: 1 May 2022

Legislative history
- Introduced by: Council of Chairpersons
- First reading: 22–26 December 2020
- Second reading: 17–20 August 2021
- Third reading: 20–24 December 2021
- Status: In force

Anti-organized Crime Law of the People's Republic of China
- Simplified Chinese: 中华人民共和国反有组织犯罪法
- Traditional Chinese: 中華人民共和國反組織犯罪法
Transcriptions
Standard Mandarin
- Hanyu Pinyin: Zhōnghuá Rénmín Gònghéguó Fǎnyǒuzǔzhī Fànzuì Fǎ

The Anti-organized Crime Law of the People's Republic of China is a legislation concerning countering organized crime in China. The law was adopted by the 32nd meeting of the Standing Committee of the 13th National People's Congress on 24 December 2021, and came into effect on 1 May 2022.

== Legislative history ==
The Anti-organized Crime Law of the People's Republic of China is officially a summary of the experience of the Special Campaign to Crack Down on Organized Crime and Eliminate Evil, and that it was introduced to ensure that the work of fighting organized crime can continue. The law was adopted by the 32nd meeting of the Standing Committee of the 13th National People's Congress on 24 December 2021, and came into effect on 1 May 2022.

== Content ==
The law consists of nine chapters and 77 articles, including general provisions, prevention and control, clarifying the concept of organized crime, clarifying the case-handling authority of public security organs, identification and disposal of property involved in the case, handling of state personnel involved in organized crime, international cooperation, safeguard measures, legal responsibilities, and supplementary provisions.

The law defines the crimes of organizing, leading, or participating in mafia-style organizations as stipulated in Article 294 of the Criminal Law of the People's Republic of China, as well as crimes committed by mafia-style organizations and evil forces, as "organized crimes." The term "evil forces" refers to criminal organizations that frequently gather together and repeatedly commit illegal and criminal activities in a certain area or industry by means of violence, threats, or other means, doing evil, oppressing the masses, disrupting social and economic order, and causing relatively bad social impact, but have not yet formed a mafia-style organization.
