= Minister of State Security (China) =

Chinese government position

Minister of State Security of the People's Republic of China
- 中华人民共和国国家安全部部长
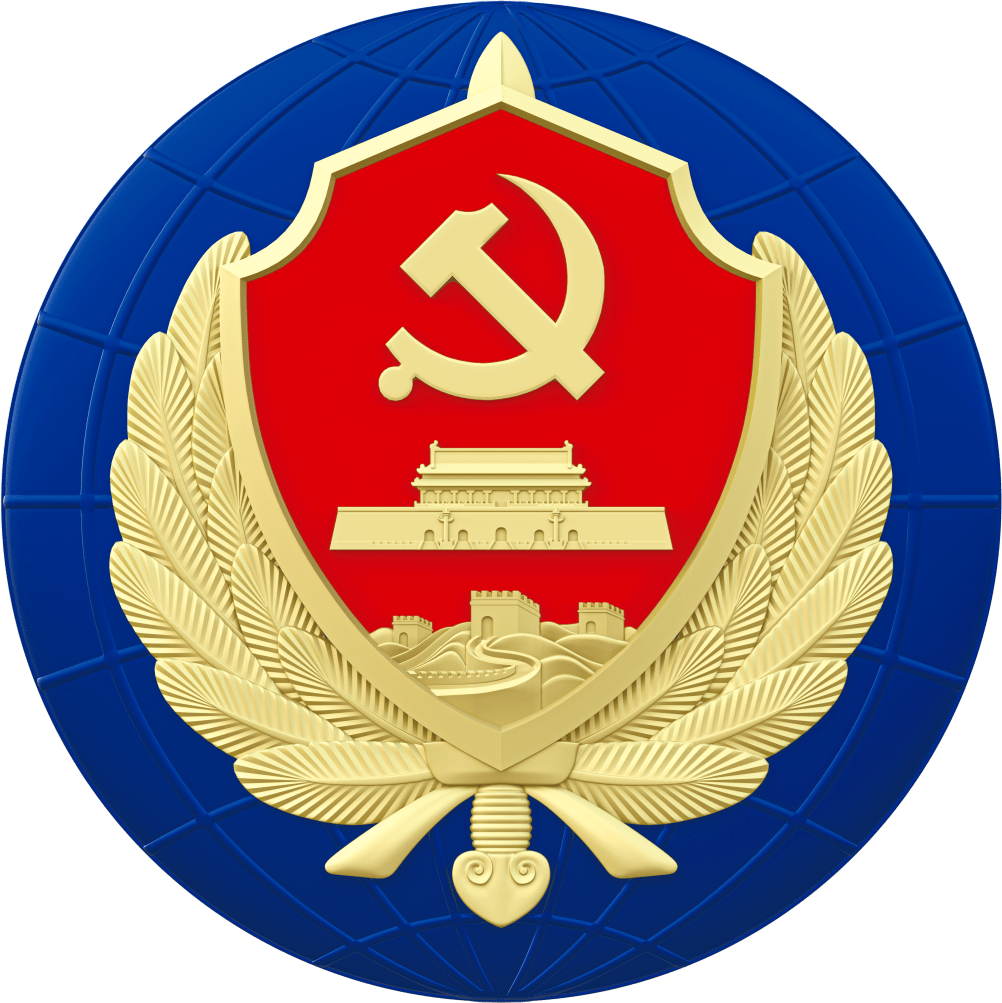
- Sword and Shield of the MSS

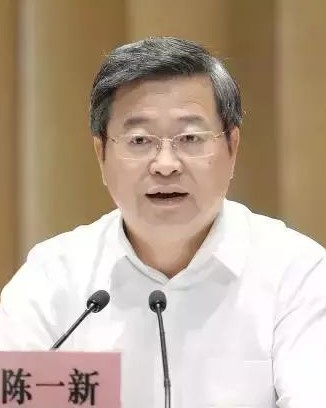
- Incumbent; Chen Yixin since 30 October 2022
- Ministry of State Security
- Style: Minister
- Status: Provincial and ministerial-level official
- Member of: Plenary Meeting of the State Council
- Reports to: Central Political and Legal Affairs Commission (CPLC)
- Seat: Yidongyuan
- Nominator: Premier (chosen within the Chinese Communist Party)
- Appointer: President; with the confirmation of the National People's Congress or its Standing Committee
- Term length: No fixed term
- Precursor: Director of the Central Investigation Department
- Formation: 1 July 1983; 43 years ago
- First holder: Ling Yun (凌云)
- Unofficial names: D/MSS
- Deputy: Vice Minister of State Security

The minister of state security is a Chinese government position within the constituent departments of the State Council which functions as the head of the Ministry of State Security. The position reports directly to the head of the Central Political and Legal Affairs Commission (CPLC) of the Chinese Communist Party. Within the State Council, the position is ninth in order of precedence. All ministers of state security have held the position as civilians while simultaneously being given the police rank of commissioner general during their tenure. Like the minister of public security, the minister holds the police badge identification number “000001”.

== History ==
The position of minister of state security was established in 1983 with the creation of the ministry following the combination of counterintelligence functions of the Ministry of Public Security with the Central Investigation Department.

Several ministers of state security have gone on to serve in other senior cabinet posts, including minister of public security. Jia Chunwang further advanced to Procurator–General of the Supreme People's Procuratorate, a position roughly equivalent to attorney general. In 2022, Chen Wenqing became the first outgoing minister of state security to be promoted directly to leader of the CPLC, whose oversight portfolio includes the MSS, while incoming minister Chen Yixin became dual hatted, retained his previous position as the third rank position of Secretary-General of the CPLC, in addition to leading the MSS.

== Selection ==
Officially, the minister is nominated by the premier of the State Council, who is then approved by the National People's Congress or its Standing Committee and appointed by the president. In practice, the minister is chosen within the Chinese Communist Party (CCP) leadership. New ministers of state security are selected periodically, with recent ministers each being formally elected to the CCP Central Committee during iterations of the CCP National Congress held every five years, though such decisions are normally made in secret at the Beidaihe meeting held each August in Beidaihe, Hebei to litigate and preplan the upcoming years decisions.

== List of ministers ==
=== Social Affairs Department (1939–1955) ===
No.	Portrait	Director	Took office	Left office	Time in office	Leader
1	Kang Sheng康生	Kang Sheng 康生 (born 1898)	1939	1949	10 years	Mao Zedong
2	Li Kenong李克农	Li Kenong 李克农 (born 1899)	1949	1955	6 years	Mao Zedong

=== Central Investigation Department (1955–1983) ===
No.	Portrait	Director	Took office	Left office	Time in office	Leader
1	Li Kenong李克农	Li Kenong 李克农 (born 1899)	1955	1962	7 years	Mao Zedong
2	Kong Yuan [zh]孔原	Kong Yuan 孔原 (born 1906)	1962	1967	5 years	Mao Zedong
3	Wang Dongxing汪东兴	Wang Dongxing 汪东兴 (born 1916)	1967	1969	2 years	Mao Zedong
4	Kang Sheng康生	Kang Sheng 康生 (born 1898)	1969	1973	4 years	Mao Zedong
5	Luo Qingchang罗青长	Luo Qingchang 罗青长 (born 1918)	1973	1983	10 years	Mao Zedong; Deng Xiaoping

=== Ministry of State Security (1983–present) ===
No.	Portrait	Minister	Took office	Left office	Time in office	Paramount leader
1	Ling Yun凌云	Ling Yun 凌云 (1917–2018)	1 June 1983	1 September 1985	2 years, 92 days	Deng Xiaoping
2	Jia Chunwang贾春旺	Jia Chunwang 贾春旺 (born 1938)	1 September 1985	1 March 1998	12 years, 181 days	Deng Xiaoping; Jiang Zemin
3	Xu Yongyue许永跃	Xu Yongyue 许永跃 (born 1942)	1 March 1998	1 August 2007	9 years, 153 days	Jiang Zemin; Hu Jintao
4	Geng Huichang耿惠昌	Geng Huichang 耿惠昌 (born 1951)	30 August 2007	7 November 2016	9 years, 96 days	Hu Jintao; Xi Jinping
5	Chen Wenqing陈文清	Chen Wenqing 陈文清 (born 1960)	7 November 2016	30 October 2022	5 years, 357 days	Xi Jinping
6	Chen Yixin陈一新	Chen Yixin 陈一新 (born 1959)	30 October 2022	Incumbent	3 years, 316 days	Xi Jinping
