= Geng Huichang =

Chinese politician

- 耿惠昌

4th Minister of State Security
- In office 30 August 2007 – 7 November 2016
- Premier: Wen Jiabao; Li Keqiang
- Preceded by: Xu Yongyue
- Succeeded by: Chen Wenqing

Personal details
- Born: 11 November 1951 (age 74) Laoting County, Hebei, China
- Party: Chinese Communist Party
- Central institution membership: 17th, 18th CCP Central Committee; 10th, 11th National People's Congress; 13th People's Political Consultative Conference

Geng Huichang (Chinese: 耿惠昌; pinyin: Gěng Hùichāng; born 11 November 1951) is a Chinese intelligence officer and politician who served as the 4th Minister of State Security of the People's Republic of China and prior as president of the China Institute of Contemporary International Relations (CICIR), the 11th bureau of the Ministry of State Security (MSS). He is currently the vice chairman of the Liaison with Hong Kong, Macao, Taiwan and Overseas Chinese Committee of the Chinese People's Political Consultative Conference (CPPCC), and a member of the Standing Committee of the National Conference of the CPPCC National Committee (NC-CPPCC).

== Early life ==
Geng was born in Laoting County, Hebei province. He reportedly has a college degree.

== Intelligence career ==
=== China Institute of Contemporary International Relations ===
In 1985 Geng became deputy director of the American Research Department of the China Institute of Contemporary International Relations (CICIR), a think tank which constitutes the 11th bureau of the Ministry of State Security (MSS). He was promoted to president in 1990, and retained this position until 1993.

He also served as deputy director general of the China International Culture Exchange Center (CICEC).

During his time at CICIR Geng held the title of "Professor" and studied Islamic fundamentalism in Asia.

=== Deputy Minister of State Security ===
In September 1998 he became deputy minister of the Ministry of State Security under Jiang Zemin. He was involved in security preparations for the 2008 Summer Olympics, and traveled to Greece in March 2006 in order to study how Greece handled security at the 2004 Olympic Games in Athens. He met with Minister of Public Order Georgios Voulgarakis in Beijing in November 2005, where a memorandum on security issues was signed.

=== Minister of State Security ===
On August 30, 2007, the 29th meeting of the Standing Committee of the 10th National People's Congress selected Geng to become Minister of State Security, allegedly following predecessor Xu Yongyue's recommendation to Jiang Zemin, head of one of China's primary political factions. In March 2008, he was officially appointed Minister of State Security at the first session of the 11th National People's Congress.

Rising through the ranks of the MSS under Jiang Zemin in the late 1990's, Geng became a political ally of Hu Jintao, who promoted him to minister so he could consolidate his own power. As an international relations specialist and an expert on the United States, Japan and industrial espionage, Geng was the first Minister of State Security with a background in international politics rather than internal security.

In August 2011 Geng visited Nepal in order to develop their bilateral relations. In September 2012 Geng was part of a delegation led by Zhou Yongkang to Singapore, Afghanistan and Turkmenistan. In Singapore, he attended the opening ceremony of the Singapore-China Social Management Forum at St. Regis Hotel.

Beginning in January 2010 Geng has also been a member of the National Energy Commission, a State Council-established body designed to improve the coordination of China's energy industry.

As MSS director he was also a statutory member of the Central Political and Legal Affairs Commission.

He was a member of the 17th and 18th Central Committees of the Chinese Communist Party.

In November 2016, Chen Wenquing succeeded Geng as MSS director.

== Political career ==
A member of the Jiang Zemin faction, Geng remains active in politics, and is currently vice chairman of the Liaison with Hong Kong, Macao, Taiwan and Overseas Chinese Committee in the People's Political Consultative Conference. Geng is also the deputy director of the first supervision group of the Central Committee for the education and rectification of the national political and legal teams.

== Bibliography ==
- Multi-National Coordination: Feasibility in Asia-Pacific in Contemporary International Relations (1992).

Preceded by Xu Yongyue	Minister of State Security; 2007–2016	Succeeded by Chen Wenqing
