= Chen Wenqing =

Chinese politician (born 1960)

- 陈文清
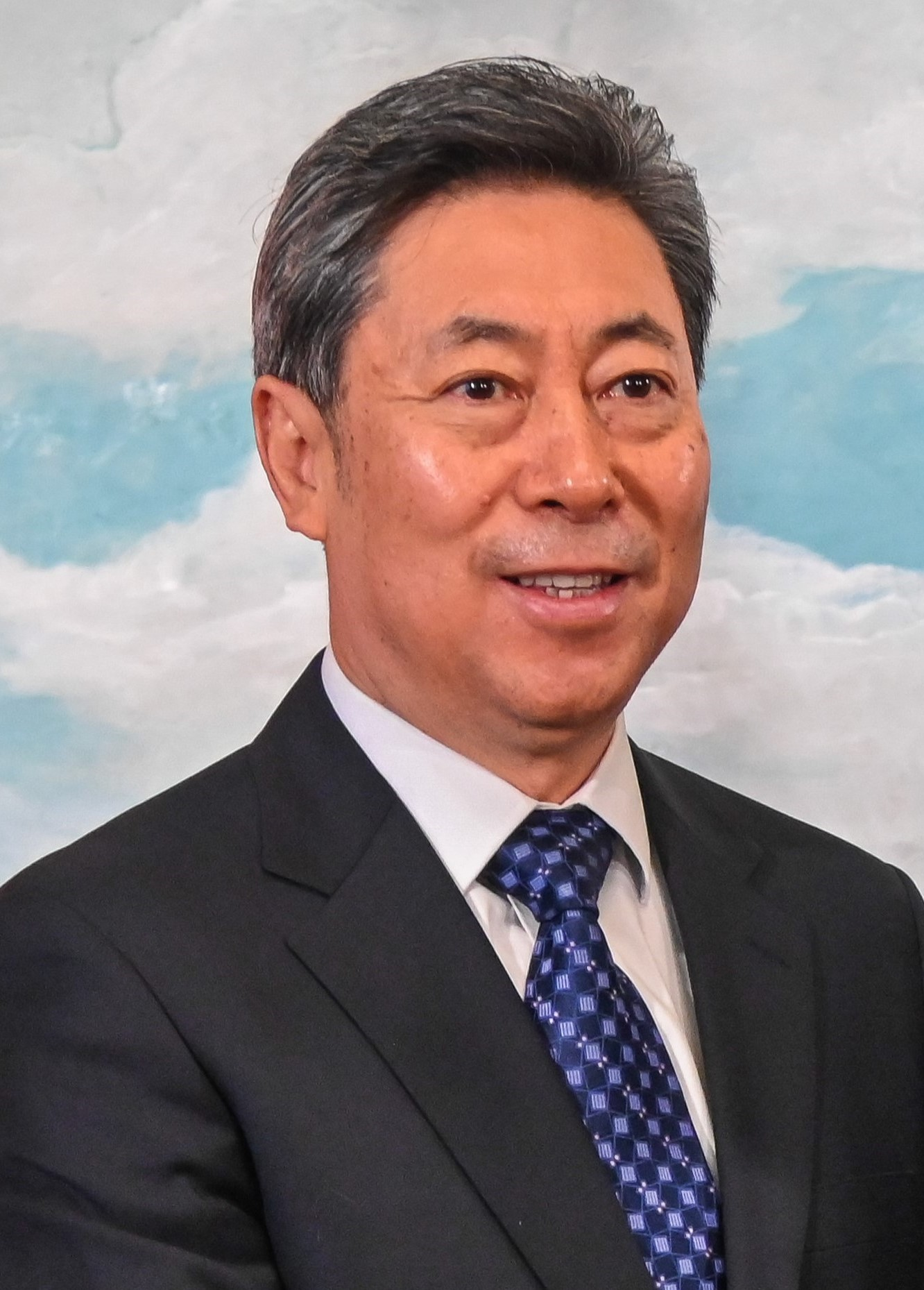
- Chen in 2024

Secretary of the Central Political and Legal Affairs Commission
- Incumbent
- Assumed office 28 October 2022
- General Secretary: Xi Jinping
- Preceded by: Guo Shengkun

5th Minister of State Security
- In office 7 November 2016 – 30 October 2022
- Premier: Li Keqiang
- Preceded by: Geng Huichang
- Succeeded by: Chen Yixin

Personal details
- Born: 24 January 1960 (age 66) Renshou County, Sichuan, People's Republic of China
- Party: Chinese Communist Party
- Education: Southwest University of Political Science & Law; Sichuan Union University
- Central institution membership: 20th CCP Politburo; 20th CCP Central Secretariat; 17th, 18th Central Commission for Discipline Inspection; 17th National Congress; 10th National People's Congress

Chinese name
Transcriptions
Standard Mandarin
- Hanyu Pinyin: Chēn Wénqīng
- IPA: [ʈʂʰən wə́nʈʂʰiŋ]

Chen Wenqing (Chinese: 陈文清; pinyin: Chén Wénqīng, IPA: [ʈʂʰən wə́nʈʂʰiŋ]; born 24 January 1960) is a Chinese intelligence officer, politician and member of the Politburo of the Chinese Communist Party who currently serves as the secretary of the Central Political and Legal Affairs Commission.

A graduate of the Southwest University, Chen joined the Ministry of Public Security in 1984. By 1986, he became a deputy director of the Public Security Bureau in Jinkouhe District. From 1986 to 1990, he served as the deputy director and then Director of the Public Security Branch of Wutongqiao District, during when he was decorated for his role in stopping two armed fugitives. He became the deputy director of the Leshan Public Security Bureau in 1990, later becoming its director in 1992. In 1994, Chen joined the Ministry of State Security (MSS), becoming the deputy director of the Sichuan provincial branch. In 1997, he became the secretary of the Party Leadership Group of the Sichuan State Security Department, becoming the department's director in 1998; he was also appointed to be the deputy secretary-general of the Sichuan provincial government. In 2002, Chen became the chief prosecutor at the Sichuan Provincial People's Procuratorate.

In 2006, Chen was transferred to Fujian, where he became the secretary of the Fujian Provincial Commission for Discipline Inspection. From January 2012 to April 2013, Chen served as political commissar of a reserve anti-aircraft artillery division of the People's Liberation Army (PLA) Ground Force in Fujian. In 2012, he was transferred to Beijing and became the deputy secretary of the Central Commission for Discipline Inspection, where he served until 2015. In 2016, he was appointed as the Party Secretary of the MSS, followed by his appointment as Minister of State Security. In 2022, he was succeeded by Chen Yixin as Minister; Chen Wenqing was made the secretary of the Central Political and Legal Affairs Commission, as well as a member of the Politburo and Central Secretariat.

== Early life and education ==
A native of Renshou County, a rural farming and coal-mining district in Sichuan province, Chen's childhood occurred against the backdrop of the Cultural Revolution and the rise of the Red Guards movement.

His father was a police officer at the Sichuan branch of the Ministry of Public Security (MPS), where for 20 consecutive years, starting in 1951, the elder Chen was recognized as a Sichuan Province "progressive worker" by Chinese Communist Party (CCP) officials. There are no records publicly available about the elder Chen's role, if any, in the Cultural Revolution, and the names of both Chen's mother and father remain unknown.

Chen studied law and political science at Southwest University in Chongqing from September 1980 through August 1984. He joined the CCP in March 1983. He returned to school in March 1995, completing a postgraduate program in business management from Sichuan University in October 1997.

== Ministry of Public Security ==
Following his father, Chen entered the Ministry of Public Security in July 1984, beginning his service as an ordinary policeman at the Xiejia Town Police Station in the Pengshan District Public Security Bureau, in Meishan, Sichuan Province. Some accounts suggest Chen's early police work involved a particular focus on counterfeiting. By late 1986 he was deputy director of the Public Security Bureau in Jinkouhe District, a closed city in the prefecture-level city of Leshan, Sichuan Province, home to the Heping gaseous diffusion plant (Plant 814) of Sichuan Honghua Industrial Corporation which produces high-enriched Uranium.

From December 1986 to June 1990, Chen was deputy director and then Director of the Public Security Branch of Wutongqiao District, another district of Leshan. In that time he was decorated for bravery for his role in stopping two armed fugitives. On 8 November 1988, Shao Jiangbin and Geng Xuejie, deserters from the Hubei province People's Armed Police, took stolen Type 56 assault rifles and thousands of rounds of ammunition and began a three-day murder spree through Hubei and Shaanxi to Sichuan. After a pursuit involving 1,516 soldiers and police officers, the "Baiyangou Bandits" were finally cornered by police during a nighttime standoff in a dimly lit area, when Chen reportedly left cover in order to climb behind a rock in an exposed position near where the pair were hiding, and installed searchlights to prevent them from escaping into the dark again. Both fugitives were killed by police during the shootout. At the end of the year, Chen was selected as an "excellent police chief" of the year by his superiors.

In June 1990, he became deputy director of the Leshan Public Security Bureau (PSB), promoted to director in December 1992.

== Ministry of State Security ==
In 1994, Chen was transferred to the Ministry of State Security (MSS), becoming deputy director of the Sichuan provincial State Security Department (SSD), likely as a founding member of what was a newly established department created in the third of four waves of MSS expansion. For many Public Security Bureau officers at the time of Chen's transfer to the Sichuan SSD, "they were police one day and state security the next."

From January 1997 to January 1998, Chen was deputy director, deputy secretary and secretary of the Party Leadership Group at the Sichuan SSD. In January 1998, Chen took over leadership of the Sichuan SSD, and secretary of the Party Leadership Group. That September he also took up the role of deputy secretary-general of the provincial government. He stayed on as Sichuan SSD head until April 2002, when he was appointed chief prosecutor at the Sichuan provincial People's Procuratorate.

== Procuratorship and anticorruption ==
External videos
- Chen speaking about anticorruption efforts in a 2014 interview with CCTV

In April 2004, Chen became more involved in legal affairs, first serving as chief prosecutor of the Sichuan Provincial People's Procuratorate before leaving Sichuan for Fujian in August 2006, becoming both deputy secretary of the Fujian Provincial Party Committee and secretary of the Provincial Commission for Discipline Inspection. His public profile began to increase in this position, holding interviews with state media about his "anti-corruption concept" as early as 2008. By 2012 he was talking publicly in Fujian about a need to investigate the loyalties and intents of Taiwanese businesses in the cross-straight province. While at the CCDI, Chen helped lead the "tiger hunt" (a reference to the fact that Mao once called South China tigers the "enemies of man" and drove them to near-extinction) against public corruption.

From January 2012 to April 2013, Chen served as political commissar of a reserve anti-aircraft artillery division of the People's Liberation Army (PLA) Ground Force in Fujian province. Fujian is located directly across the strait from Taiwan, and is the garrison of Eastern Theater Command (previously Nanjing Military Region), charged with maintaining security in the East China Sea and the conduct of major operations against Taiwan. "Fujian experience" is considered especially prestigious, and a key prerequisite in the career track of many senior Communist Party officials and PLA officers. At the 18th National Congress of the Chinese Communist Party (CCP) in November 2012, Xi Jinping became General Secretary of the Communist Party, and Chen moved to Beijing to become deputy secretary and member of the standing committee of the 18th Central Commission for Discipline Inspection, both roles he retained until May 2015. Chen's activities during the time between his departure from CCDI in May 2015 and his appointment as party secretary of the MSS in October 2016 are entirely unclear.

== Minister of State Security ==
Chen was appointed Party Secretary of the MSS in October 2016. In 2016 command of the Ministry of State Security was split between outgoing Minister Geng Huichang, and Chen as new Party Secretary. Geng was due to retire, but before leaving he was placed under investigation. Chen appointed Tang Chao as a "special agent" to look into claims that Geng had used MSS technical means to monitor the communications of senior communist party officials, including Hu Jintao and Xi Jinping. Ultimately Geng was exonerated when the CCDI concluded that Zhou Yongkang had circumvented MSS leadership, including head of Counterintelligence Liang Ke.

Despite no longer being blamed for the breach, Xi Jinping chose to replace Geng with Chen anyway, clearing the way for a slate of reforms meant to reduce MSS influence, and increase the influence of the First Bureau of the Ministry of Public Security, which also conducts foreign intelligence operations. There had already been a major shakeup of MSS regional offices underway before Chen's appointment, reportedly on the direction of Xi Jinping himself. Chen became Minister of State Security on 7 November 2016. He began by investigating and arresting his college friend and MSS counterintelligence head Ma Jian, reportedly as a test to prove his loyalty to the Xi Jinping faction. Under Chen's new leadership "arrests and purges began to multiply rapidly."

In early 2018, Chen's MSS was given responsibility for the security of all Belt and Road Initiative (BRI) projects across 28 participating countries, after a lengthy fight for control against the Ministry of Public Security, CCP security coordinator Meng Jianzhu. In response, Chen led efforts to build stronger relations with Asian allies such as U Thaung Tun, Myanmar's National Security Advisor, and General Tô Lâm, current Minister of Public Security of Vietnam. Soon after the MSS' selection for the program, Chen met with the heads of the intelligence services of Saudi Arabia, Pakistan, Spain, Germany and Turkey. Intelligence Online reported that Chen sought to strengthen MSS efforts in island nations that are crossed by the maritime component of the BRI, such as the Seychelles and the Maldives, in an effort to counter Indian influence, and deepen cooperation with the Turkish National Intelligence Organization (MİT), key to the MSS' efforts to identify Uyghur jihadists which remain a top concern of senior Chinese officials.

In 2020, Chen presided over a meeting of the Party Committee of the MSS regarding implementation of the Hong Kong national security law. Days after the law's passage, Chen and his ministry pledged to aid authorities in Hong Kong in its implementation.

Following the Summer 2021 US withdrawal from Afghanistan, Chen reportedly met directly with acting Taliban interior minister Sirajuddin Haqqani in Kabul several times as China increased support to Taliban intelligence operations. He later joined senior intelligence officials from Russia, Iran and Tajikistan at a summit led by LTG Faiz Hameed, chief of Pakistan's ISI, to explore regional stability concerns among the participants as the Islamic Republic of Afghanistan began to collapse.

In late February 2018, Reuters reported that five sources including two foreign diplomats confirmed to them that Chen was going to be replaced by Wang Xiaohong in the session of parliament beginning 5 March 2018. Wang was instead made Deputy Minister of Public Security at the meeting, and promoted to Minister of Public Security in November 2021, while Chen continued to lead the MSS. On 30 October 2022, Chen was succeeded by Chen Yixin.

== Central Political and Legal Affairs secretary ==
After the 20th National Congress in October 2022, Chen was made a member of the Politburo and Central Secretariat. As the only member of the Politburo with a background in state security, Chen was made secretary of the Central Political and Legal Affairs Commission (CPLAC), succeeding Guo Shengkun. John P. Burns, emeritus professor of politics at the University of Hong Kong, said Chen's appointment signaled the party's insecurity both internationally with a more contentious relationship with the US and Europe, and domestically on issues related to Xinjiang, Tibet, and other cities. In November 2022, after protests broke out against COVID-19 restrictions, Chen called for a crackdown on "hostile forces".

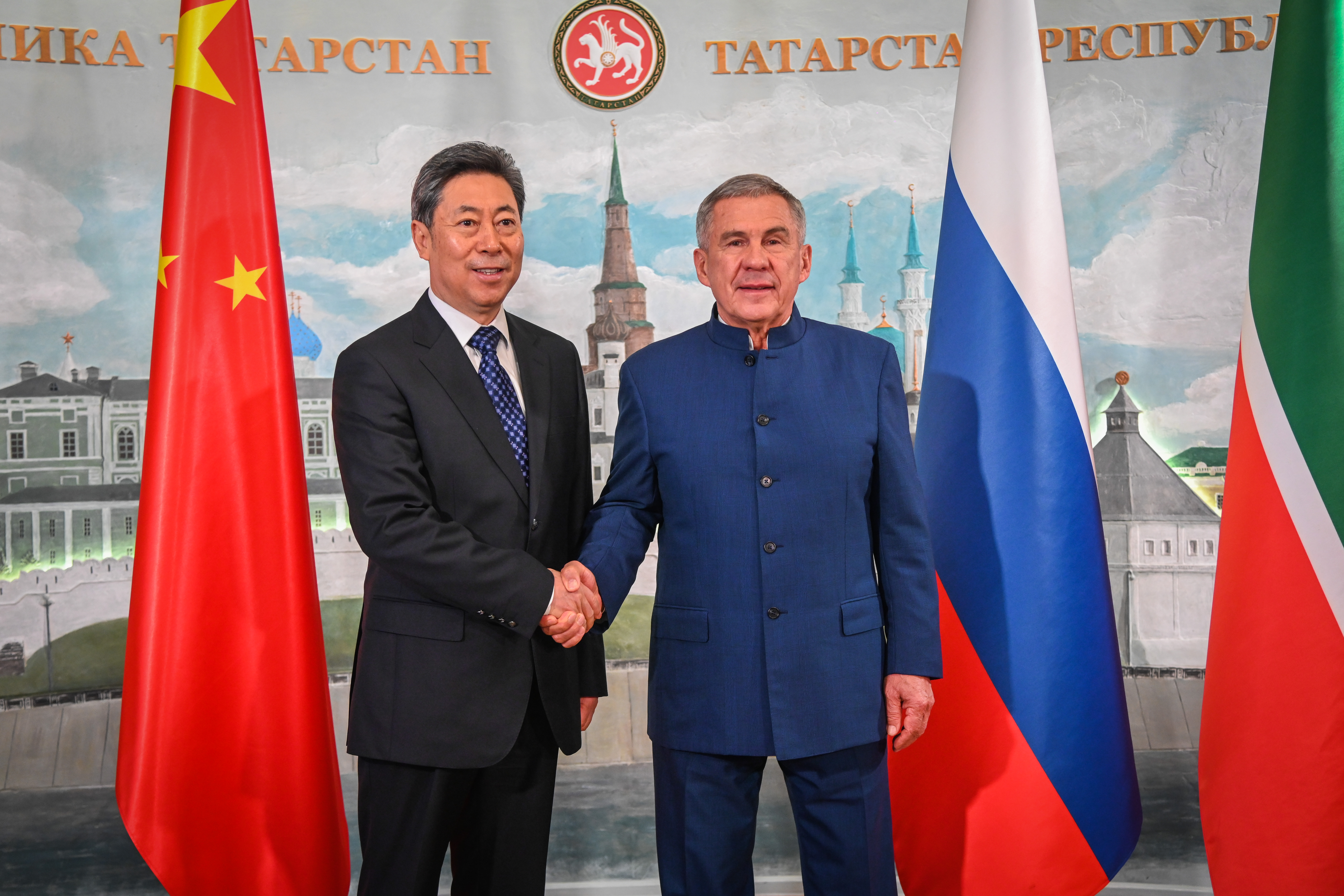
Chen with the Head of Tatarstan Rustam Minnikhanov in Russia, 26 April 2024

In a meeting in February 2023, Chen said all political and legal organizations must show "absolute loyalty" to the Party. In May 2023, in his first trip overseas as CPLAC secretary, Chen visited Russia to attend the International Meeting of High Representatives for Security Issues, meeting SVR director Sergey Naryshkin. He took a five-day trip Xinjiang in June 2023, where he said law enforcement should be used to tackle terrorism and crime. He visited Chengdu in June 2023 ahead of the FISU World University Games, calling for an improvement in internal security. In July 2023, Chen directed CCP committees at all levels to "attach great importance to, concern themselves with, and support covert front work." In the same month, he also told a meeting of judges and prosecutors to direct a crackdown on telecommunication network fraud. He paid an inspection trip to Gansu, where he called on Tibet and Xinjiang to ensure stability. in August 2023, In September 2023, Chen visited Germany, where he attended a China-Germany high-level security dialogue in Berlin, the first time a top ranking security official from China visited Germany.

At a virtual meeting in January 2024, Chen delivered instructions by Xi to "defuse" social and economic risks. In April 2024, Chen visited Russia and met with Russian Security Council Secretary Nikolai Patrushev, telling him China supported Russia's efforts to ensure its national security. He visited Xinjiang in May 2024, where he called on for a "normalization" of counterterrorism efforts. In June 2024, he met with Turkish Foreign Minister Hakan Fidan. In September 2024, he embarked on a four-day visit to the Tibet Autonomous Region and the Garzê Tibetan Autonomous Prefecture in Sichuan, where he said security services should "resolutely crack down on separatist and destructive activities". He visited security units in Lhasa and Chamdo, while he presided over a meeting about "anti-secession work" in Garzê. In January 2025, he was elected as the president of the China Law Society. In April 2025, Chen visited Xinjiang, where he called on officials so "combat violent and terrorist crimes according to the law, and eliminate the soil of religious extremism" and promote the use of Mandarin Chinese among ethnic minorities. In May 2025, Chen visited Moscow, where he met with Security Council Secretary Sergei Shoigu, telling him that China and Russia are "fighting together against attempts to harm sovereignty, security and development issues". In June 2025, he undertook a three-day inspection tour of Qinghai Province, where he called the province a "strategic stronghold for maintaining stability in Xinjiang and Tibet". In November 2025, he met with Syrian Foreign Minister Asaad al-Shaibani.

== Publications ==
- Firmly Establish and Practice the Overall National Security Concept and Write a New Chapter of National Security in the New Era, Qiushi, April 2022.

Government offices
Preceded by Geng Huichang	Minister of State Security; 2016–2022	Succeeded by Chen Yixin
Order of precedence
Preceded by Yin Li as Member of the Politburo of the Chinese Communist Party	Order of precedence of China as Member of the Politburo of the Chinese Communist Party	Succeeded by Chen Jining as Member of the Politburo of the Chinese Communist Party
