= Ling Yun =

Chinese politician

- 凌云
- Ling Yun (Left) with Paramount Leader Deng Xiaoping (Right)

Minister of State Security
- In office 1 June 1983 – 1 September 1985
- Premier: Zhao Ziyang
- Preceded by: Office established
- Succeeded by: Jia Chunwang

Personal details
- Born: Wu Peilin; 29 June 1917 Jiaxing, Zhejiang, China
- Died: 15 March 2018 (aged 100) Beijing, China
- Party: Chinese Communist Party
- Spouse: Mei Jianqun (梅建群)

Ling Yun
- Traditional Chinese: 凌雲
- Simplified Chinese: 凌云
Transcriptions
Standard Mandarin
- Hanyu Pinyin: Líng Yún

Ling Yun (Chinese: 凌云; 29 June 1917 – 15 March 2018), born as Wu Peilin (吴沛霖), was a politician of the People's Republic of China, who served as the first Minister of State Security, from June 1983 (officially from July 1) to September 1985.

A protégé of General Luo Ruiqing, he headed the 1st Bureau of the Ministry of Public Security during the early Maoist years, dealing with suppression of political, ethnic and religious opponents of the Chinese Communist Party.

== Biography ==
Ling Yun was born in Jiaxing, Zhejiang on 29 June 1917. He joined the Chinese Communist Party (CCP) in April 1938 and became a guerrilla fighter in Shanxi Province. He received military training at the "Shanxi Youth Officers School", run by warlord Yan Xishan, who, at the time, was working together with the CCP to oppose the Empire of Japan during the Second Sino-Japanese War. Later, he moved to neighboring Shaanxi Province, where he studied at the "Northern Shaanxi Public School", which was established in 1937 by the CCP to train anti-Japanese military and political officers. After graduating, he was posted at the headquarters of the CCP in Yan'an, where he joined and advanced in the ranks of the Central Social Affairs Department, led, at the time, by Kang Sheng.

After the outbreak of the Chinese Civil War, Ling became a member of the North China land reform team led by Kang Sheng, and was active in seizing land from wealthy landlords and distributing it to peasants. In August 1948, he served as the Director of the Public Security Bureau (police chief) of the city of Weifang, after it was captured by the People's Liberation Army, and from 1949 to 1952 he was Deputy Director of the Public Security Bureau of Jinan, the capital of Shandong.

From 1952 to 1966, Ling was based in Beijing, as Deputy Director and then Director of the 1st Bureau of the Ministry of Public Security, and from 1963 Deputy Minister of Public Security, handling very sensitive issues, as his Bureau dealt with the suppression of political, ethnic and religious separatism.

After the outbreak of the Cultural Revolution in 1966, the leadership of the Ministry of Public Security (with the notable exception of the Minister himself, Xie Fuzhi, who was an ally of the radicals) was accused of having created "an underground counter-revolutionary Ministry of Public Security headed by Luo Ruiqing" (the previous Minister). All 7 Deputy Ministers were removed from office, as were 63 department heads within the Ministry. Ling himself was expelled from the CCP, arrested, tortured by Red Guards, and then sent to do manual labor.

After the Cultural Revolution, Ling Yun was restored to all his posts and was again appointed Deputy Minister of Public Security in 1978, serving until 1983.

In June 1983, Deng Xiaoping, who had risen to supreme power in China, decided to create a new security, intelligence and regime protection agency by merging the counter-intelligence and political security departments of the Ministry of Public Security with the Central Investigation Department (which had been China's primary civilian intelligence apparatus since 1955). Deng did this because he wanted to sideline Luo Qingchang, who had been the Director of the Central Investigation Department since 1973, and strongly opposed Deng's policies (he was loyal to the Maoist legacy).

As a result, the new Ministry of State Security was established, and Ling Yun, as an experienced counterintelligence specialist, became the first Minister. Ling remained in office until September 1985, when he retired and was replaced by the much younger Jia Chunwang.

Ling died in Beijing on March 15, 2018.

Government offices
Preceded by None	Minister of State Security; 1983–1985	Succeeded by Jia Chunwang
