= Alcalá 20 nightclub fire =

1983 fire disaster in Madrid

- Date: 17 December 1983
- Time: 4:45 a.m.
- Venue: Alcalá 20 nightclub
- Location: Madrid, Spain; 40.417959°N 3.699026°W
- Type: Fire
- Deaths: 82
- Injuries: 27

The Alcalá 20 nightclub fire occurred on 17 December 1983 at 4:45 a.m. at Alcalá 20, a nightclub at number 20 Calle de Alcalá in the centre of Madrid. There were 600 people in the club at the time; 82 people were killed and 27 injured. During the fire, an exit on one of the upper floors was locked, and a main exit to an adjoining building was closed with an iron grill.

The charred remains of the labyrinthine four story subterranean club remained intact but closed until 2003, when a major refurbishment was started. A remodelled two-story club, named Adraba, opened on the site in 2005 with improved fire safety. However it was closed down by city authorities after only three hours. In November 2007 the club was reopened, but was closed down once again within a few hours by the authorities. The club reopened under a new name in February 2010 after installing modern fire safety devices.

== See also ==
- 2000 Luoyang Christmas fire
