= Giovanni Vigliotto =

American bigamist and fraudster

Giovanni Vigliotto (c. 1930 – 1991) was an American bigamist and fraudster.

Vigliotto told his targets that he lived some distance away and asked them to join him there. Once the women had packed and were ready to move, he would drive their belongings away in a moving truck, promising to call them later. He would then sell their goods at flea markets. Some of the victims reported him, but investigators could not find any leads.

Vigliotto's 105th victim decided to find him herself. She had met Vigliotto at a flea market, so she decided to drive to all the flea markets she could find. Eventually she located him in Florida, where he was selling her furniture. She informed the police and he was arrested.

The trial against Vigliotto began in Phoenix, Arizona on March 28, 1983. On April 11 he was sentenced to twenty-eight years in prison for fraud and six for bigamy and fined $336,000.
