= Jinkouhe, Leshan =

Jinkouhe 金口河区 • ꏢꈈꉼꐎ
- District
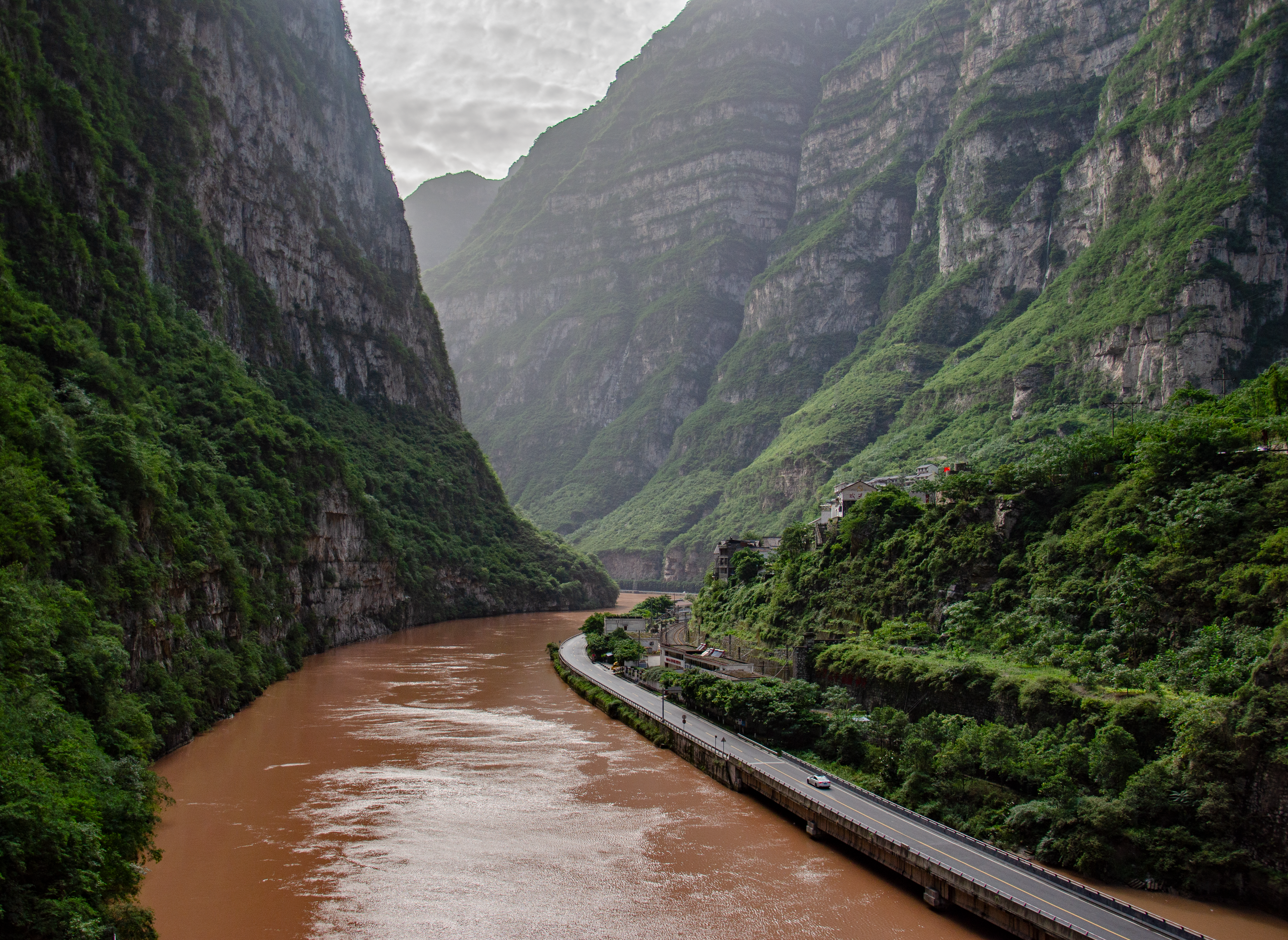
- Guancunba railway station of Chengdu–Kunming railway in Dadu River Valley, Jinkouhe

- Location in Sichuan
- Coordinates: 29°14′40″N 103°04′43″E
- Country: China
- Province: Sichuan
- Prefecture-level city: Leshan
- County seat: Heping Yi Ethnic Township

Area
  - Total: 598 km^{2} (231 sq mi)

Population (2020 census)
  - Total: 38,727
  - Density: 64.8/km^{2} (168/sq mi)
- Time zone: UTC+8 (China Standard)
- Website: www.jkh.gov.cn

Jinkouhe (Chinese: 金口河区; pinyin: Jīnkǒuhé Qū; Yi: ꏢꈈꉼꐎ, ji ko hop qu) is a district of the city of Leshan, Sichuan Province, China.

Sichuan Honghua Industrial Corporation (formerly the 814 Plant), a subsidiary of China National Nuclear Corporation, is located in Heping Yi Autonomous Town in the district, thus the district is one of the few areas in China that are still closed to foreigners.

== Administrative divisions ==
Jinkouhe District has jurisdiction over 2 towns, 1 township, and 2 ethnic townships:

- Yonghe Town (永和镇)
- Jinhe Town (金河镇)
- Yongsheng Township (永胜乡)
- Heping Yi Ethnic Township (和平彝族乡; ꉼꀻꆈꌠꑣ, hop pip nuo su xie)
- Gong'an Yi Ethnic Township (共安彝族乡; ꇭꉢꆈꌠꑣ, gop nga nuo su xie)
