= Lishui University =

University in Lishui, China

Coordinates: 28°27′44″N 119°54′36″E

- 丽水学院
- Former names: Chuzhou Normal School; Zhejiang No. 11 Normal School
- Motto: 明德笃行
- Type: Public university
- Established: 1907
- Affiliations: Lishui government
- President: Xiao Gang (肖刚)
- Academic staff: 1,126
- Students: 13,983
- Undergraduates: 10,698
- Location: Lishui, Zhejiang, China
- Campus: Urban: 672,106.67-square-metre (7,234,496.0 sq ft)
- Website: www.lsu.edu.cn

Lishui University (simplified Chinese: 丽水学院; traditional Chinese: 麗水學院; pinyin: Líshuǐ Xuéyuàn) is a public university located in Lishui, Zhejiang, China. It has an area of about 672,106.67-square-metre (7,234,496.0 sq ft) and a building area of about 387,400-square-metre (4,170,000 sq ft). As of fall 2017, the university has one campuses, a combined student body of 13,983 students, 1,126 faculty members, and over 200,000 living alumni.

== History ==
Lishui University traces its origins to the former Chuzhou Normal School (处州师范学堂), in 1907 and would later become the Zhejiang No. 11 Normal School (浙江省立第十一师范学校).

In 1923, Zhejiang No. 11 Normal School and Zhejiang No. 11 High School merged and was divided into secondary school department and teacher education department.

In 1937, after the Marco Polo Bridge Incident broke out, the school stopped recruiting students.

In 1939, Yingshi University was founded in the site of Lishui Normal School.

In 1946, Chuzhou Normal School was reconstructed in Yunhe County. Three years later, the school moved to Lishui.

After the establishment of the Communist State in 1953, it was officially renamed Lishui Normal College.

In August 2000, Zhejiang Minorities Normal College and Songyang Normal College merged into Lishui Normal College.

In March 2003, Lishui Normal College merged with Lishui Vocational and Technical College.

In May 2004, the college was upgraded to an undergraduate university. Lishui Normal College was officially renamed Lishui Normal University, which is still used today.

In March 2007, Lishui Health School was merged into the university.

== Schools and Departments ==
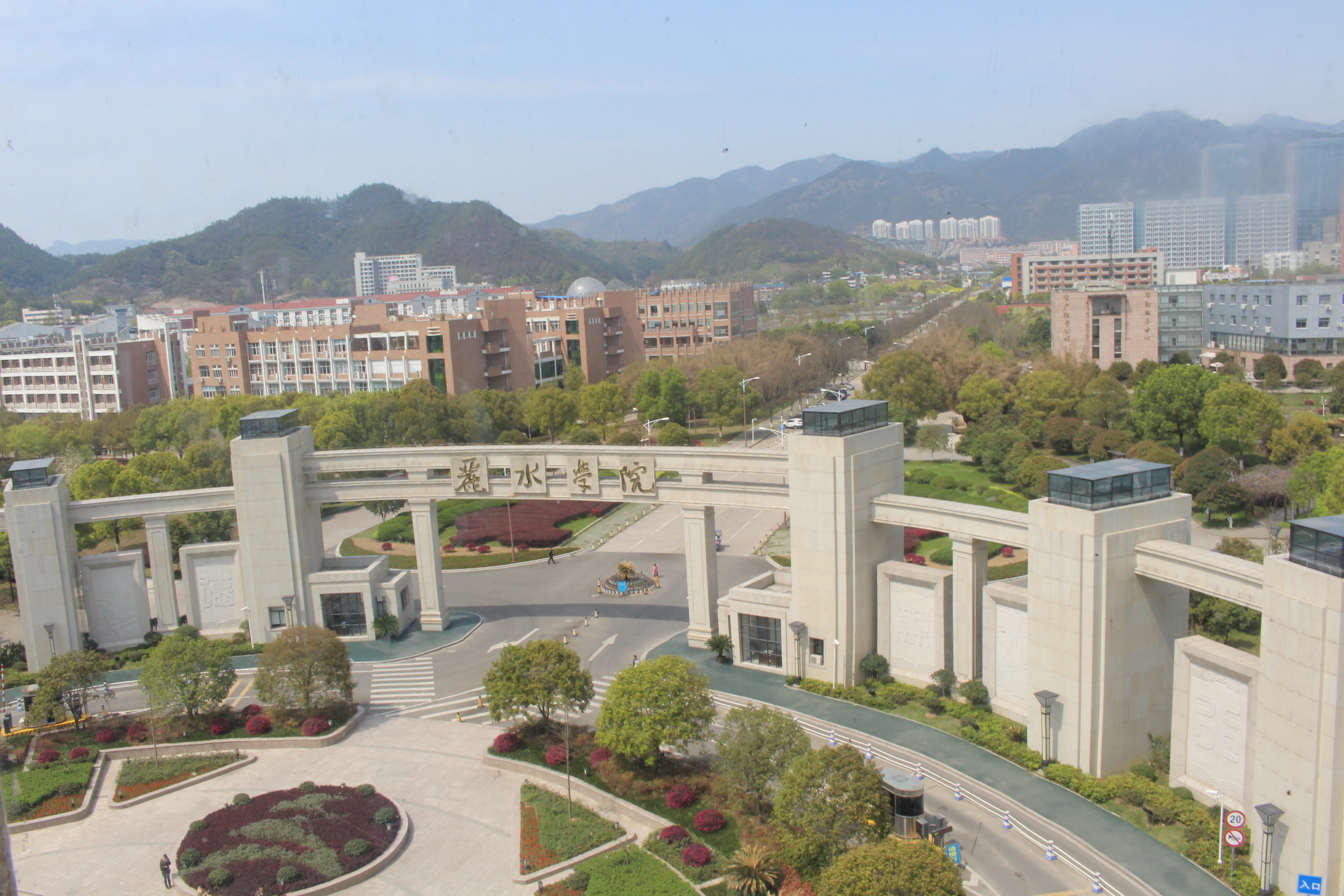
School gate of Lishui University.

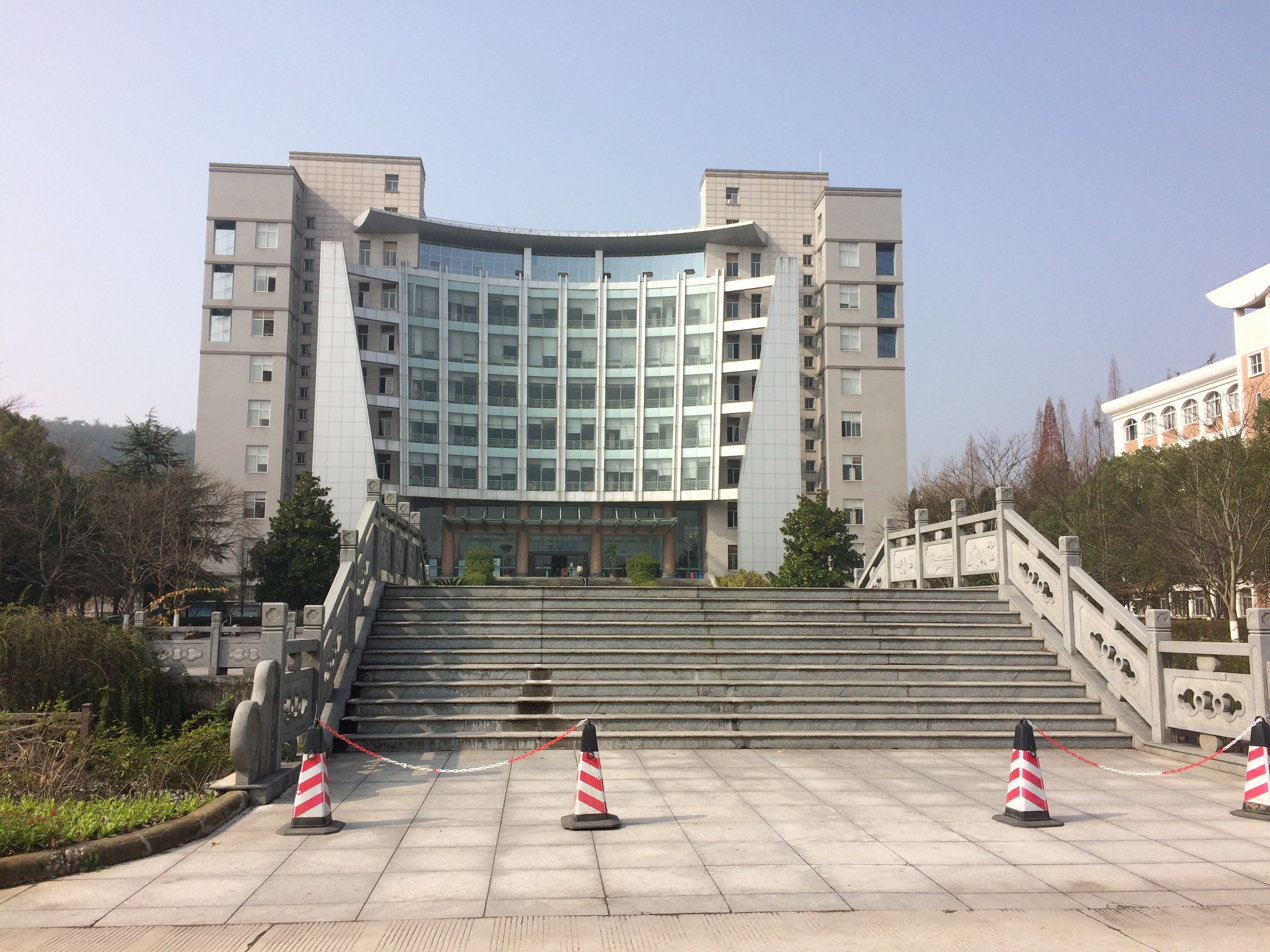
Library of Lishui University.

The university consists of 8 colleges, with 45 specialties for undergraduates.

- School of Project and Design
- School of Ecology
- School of Teacher Education
- School of Business
- School of Nationalities
- School of Medical and Health Sciences
- Vocational college
- School of Continuing Education

== Culture ==
- Motto: 明德笃行. The motto of the school is cited from Great Learning and Book of Rites.
- College newspaper: Lishui University Journal (《丽水学院学报》)
- Library: the library contains 1,566,900 volumes of paper books, 643,200 volumes of electronic books, 52,800 kinds of electronic periodicals and 35 electronic resources database.

== Affiliated schools ==
- Secondary School attached to Lishui University
