= Strike Hard Against Crime Campaign (1983) =

Chinese anti-crime campaign

The 1983 "Strike Hard" Anti-crime Campaign (Chinese: 严厉打击刑事犯罪活动; pinyin: Yánlì dǎjí xíngshì fànzuì huódòng), or "Stern Blow" Anti-crime Campaign of 1983, was an anti-crime campaign initiated by former Paramount Leader of China, Deng Xiaoping. Beginning in September 1983, the campaign lasted for three years and five months, and was launched largely as a result of the nationwide worsening of public safety due to the breakdown of social order and the public security system following the Cultural Revolution. During this time, crimes like rape, murder, robbery, and arson occurred en masse.

During the "three battles" of the "Strike Hard" campaign, some 197,000 criminal groups were targeted, 1.77 million people were arrested and 1.74 million people were prosecuted with an estimated 30,000 sentenced to death. Although visible improvements in public safety followed, controversies arose as to whether the punishments were too harsh, and whether the legal processes of many cases were complete and rigorous.

== Background ==
Prior to the crackdown, the launch of the reform and the opening up policy, the public safety situation was extremely chaotic. According to data from the Ministry of Public Security, in 1978, 530,000 public security and criminal cases were filed in the People's Republic of China; in 1980, more than 750,000, including more than 50,000 major cases; in 1981, more than 890,000, including more than 67,000 major cases. In 1982, more than 740,000, including 64,000 major cases. In the first few months of 1983, the number of cases continued to increase sharply. Many of these cases caused serious disturbance to public security.

== Progress and results ==
The "Strike Hard" campaign was launched during the early stage of legal re-construction; when the Chinese legal system had been all -but destroyed in the Cultural Revolution. The criminal law of China came into effect in 1980 and the new Constitution of China was passed in 1982, Subsequently, the campaign was formally launched in September 1983 and lasted until January 1987, receiving support from Deng Xiaoping.

Their campaign consisted of three rounds or "battles" as described by state media. In total, crackdowns focused on some 197,000 criminal groups. 1.77 million people were arrested, of these, 321,000 were "re-educated through labor" and 1.75 million people received legal punishment, with some 24,000 were executed (mainly in the first round), having an immediate effect on public safety. Scholars estimate that during the three years of the campaign, some 30,000 people were sentenced to death. A number of people arrested (some even received death penalty) were children or relatives of government officials at various levels, including the grandson of Zhu De, demonstrating the principle of "equality before the law".

== Controversies ==
The campaign itself was the subject of much controversy due to reported use of torture, extrajudicial detentions, arrest quotas, forced confessions and miscarriages of justice, in which innocents were executed and or imprisoned for extended periods of time. The long-term effectiveness of the "strike hard" campaign on public safety has also been questioned. According to the New York Times, the percentage of policemen killed in the line of duty in during the campaign was several times higher than the United States and as many as 10 times the rate during the Mao era.

During the 1980s crackdown, many people were sentenced to death for engaging in open sexual relationships. People who had sexual relations with multiple people or premarital sex were regarded by the Communist Party as "crime of hooliganism."

== Subsequent campaigns ==
CCP General Secretary Jiang Zemin initiated the Second Strike Hard campaign in 1996, and third Strike Hard campaign in 2001. In 2001, the state newspaper the People's Daily reported multiple cases of execution of gangsters and individuals involved in organized crime, specifically in cases of robberies, kidnapping, blackmail, drug trafficking.

Jiang's successor Hu Jintao initiated a fourth Strike Hard Against Crime Campaign in (2010). This was followed by the Strike Hard Campaign Against Violent Terrorism campaign in Xinjiang, involving the detention of millions of Uyghurs, political and religious repression, and widespread dissemination of surveillance within the region.

Under the anti-corruption campaign launched under CCP general secretary Xi Jinping, a parallel campaign has been operating since 2013 against organized crime and local party officials who shelter criminal networks and criminal groups. In July 2021, the South China Morning Post reported that Chen Yixin, secretary general of the Central Political and Legal Affairs Commission, stated that the new "strike hard" campaign against organized crime in 2018 would target the telecoms, resources, transport and construction sectors, industries in which rent seeking and corruption are known to take place in China. The campaign was originally meant to run for three years, but in March 2021, Guo Shengkun, party secretary of the commission, said the campaign would continue as it had "won the people's support" for cleaning up the grass roots governance system (referring to residential communities in cities and villages in rural areas).

== See also ==
- Campaign to Suppress Counterrevolutionaries – 1950–1953 Chinese political repression campaign
- Constitution of China – Supreme law of China since 1982
- Cultural Revolution – Period of sociopolitical turmoil in China (1966–1976)
- Legal history of China
- Reform and opening up – Economic reforms in China since 1978
