= Alternates of the 18th Central Committee of the Chinese Communist Party =

The 18th Central Committee of the Chinese Communist Party was elected by the 18th National Congress in 2012, with 171 individuals serving as alternates during this term.

== Alternates ==
Alternates of the 18th Central Committee of the Chinese Communist Party
Ballot	Name		17th CC	19th CC	Birth	PM	Death	Birthplace	Ethnicity	Gender	Ref.
1	Ma Jiantang (Note: Ma Jiantang was advanced from alternate to member of the 18th Central Committee to fill a vacant seat by a decision of the 4th Plenary Session of the 18th Central Committee, held on 20–23 October 2014.)	马建堂	Nonmember	Nonmember	1958	1983	Alive	Shandong	Han	Male	
2	Wang Zuo'an (Note: Wang Zuo'an was advanced from alternate to member of the 18th Central Committee to fill a vacant seat by a decision of the 4th Plenary Session of the 18th Central Committee, held on 20–23 October 2014.)	王作安	Nonmember	Nonmember	1958	1985	Alive	Jiangsu	Han	Male	
3	Mao Wanchun (Note: Mao Wanchun was advanced from alternate to member of the 18th Central Committee to fill a vacant seat by a decision of the 4th Plenary Session of the 18th Central Committee, held on 20–23 October 2014.)	毛万春	Nonmember	Alternate	1961	1983	Alive	Henan	Han	Male	
4	Liu Xiaokai (Note: Liu Xiaokai was advanced from alternate to member of the 18th Central Committee to fill a vacant seat by a decision of the 5th Plenary Session of the 18th Central Committee, held on 26–29 October 2015.)	刘晓凯	Alternate	Alternate	1962	1985	Alive	Guizhou	Miao	Male	
5	Chen Zhirong (Note: Chen Zhirong was advanced from alternate to member of the 18th Central Committee to fill a vacant seat by a decision of the 5th Plenary Session of the 18th Central Committee, held on 26–29 October 2015.)	陈志荣	Nonmember	Nonmember	1957	1975	2016	Hainan	Li	Male	
6	Jin Zhenji (Note: Jin Zhenji was advanced from alternate to member of the 18th Central Committee to fill a vacant seat by a decision of the 5th Plenary Session of the 18th Central Committee, held on 26–29 October 2015.)	金振吉	Alternate	Nonmember	1959	1979	Alive	Jilin	Korean	Male	
7	Zhao Xiangeng (Note: Zhao Xiangeng was advanced from alternate to member of the 18th Central Committee to fill a vacant seat by a decision of the 6th Plenary Session of the 18th Central Committee, held on 24–27 October 2016.)	赵宪庚	Alternate	Nonmember	1953	—	Alive	Shanxi	Han	Male	
8	Xian Hui (Note: Xian Hui was advanced from alternate to member of the 18th Central Committee to fill a vacant seat by a decision of the 6th Plenary Session of the 18th Central Committee, held on 24–27 October 2016.)	咸辉	Alternate	Member	1958	1976	Alive	Gansu	Han	Female	
9	Mo Jiancheng (Note: Mo Jiancheng was found guilty of corruption on 23 September 2017. Following deliberation by the Standing Committee of the 18th Central Commission for Discipline Inspection, his removal as an alternate of the 18th Central Committee was proposed to the 18th Politburo. The Politburo adopted the recommendation in April 2007, pending subsequent confirmation by the 18th Central Committee at its next plenary session. The decision was then ratified ex post by the 7th Plenary Session of the 18th Central Committee, held on 11–14 October 2017.)	莫建成	Nonmember	Nonmember	1956	1977	Alive	Zhejiang	Han	Male	
10	Cui Bo (Note: Cui Bo was advanced from alternate to member of the 18th Central Committee to fill a vacant seat by a decision of the 7th Plenary Session of the 18th Central Committee, held on 11–14 October 2017.)	崔波	Nonmember	Nonmember	1957	1975	Alive	Shandong	Han	Male	
11	Shu Xiaoqin (Note: Shu Xiaoqin was advanced from alternate to member of the 18th Central Committee to fill a vacant seat by a decision of the 7th Plenary Session of the 18th Central Committee, held on 11–14 October 2017.)	舒晓琴	Alternate	Nonmember	1956	1977	Alive	Jiangxi	Han	Female	
12	Ma Shunqing (Note: Ma Shunqing was advanced from alternate to member of the 18th Central Committee to fill a vacant seat by a decision of the 7th Plenary Session of the 18th Central Committee, held on 11–14 October 2017.)	马顺清	Nonmember	Alternate	1963	1984	Alive	Qinghai	Hui	Male	
13	Wang Jianjun (Note: Wang Jianjun was advanced from alternate to member of the 18th Central Committee to fill a vacant seat by a decision of the 7th Plenary Session of the 18th Central Committee, held on 11–14 October 2017.)	王建军	Nonmember	Member	1958	1984	Alive	Hubei	Han	Male	
14	Zhu Mingguo (Note: Zhu Mingguo was found guilty of corruption on 28 November 2014. Following deliberation by the Standing Committee of the 18th Central Commission for Discipline Inspection, his removal as an alternate of the 18th Central Committee was proposed to the 18th Politburo. The Politburo adopted the recommendation in February 2015, pending subsequent confirmation by the 18th Central Committee at its next plenary session. The decision was then ratified ex post by the 5th Plenary Session of the 18th Central Committee, held on 26–29 October 2015.)	朱明国	Nonmember	Nonmember	1957	1975	Alive	Hainan	Li	Male	
15	Liu Xuepu	刘学普	Alternate	Nonmember	1957	1982	Alive	Chongqing	Tujia	Male	
16	Li Qiang (Note: Li Qiang was advanced from alternate to member of the 18th Central Committee to fill a vacant seat by a decision of the 3rd Plenary Session of the 17th Central Committee, held on 9–12 October 2008.)	李强	Nonmember	Member	1959	1983	Alive	Zhejiang	Han	Male	
17	Yang Chongyong (Note: Yang Chongyong was found guilty of corruption on 11 April 2017. Following deliberation by the Standing Committee of the 18th Central Commission for Discipline Inspection, his removal as an alternate of the 18th Central Committee was proposed to the 18th Politburo. The Politburo adopted the recommendation in July 2007, pending subsequent confirmation by the 18th Central Committee at its next plenary session. The decision was then ratified ex post by the 7th Plenary Session of the 18th Central Committee, held on 11–14 October 2017.)	杨崇勇	Nonmember	Nonmember	1955	1980	Alive	Yunnan	Manchu	Male	
18	Yu Yuanhui (Note: Yu Yuanhui was found guilty of corruption on 22 May 2015. Following deliberation by the Standing Committee of the 18th Central Commission for Discipline Inspection, his removal as an alternate of the 18th Central Committee was proposed to the 18th Politburo. The Politburo adopted the recommendation in October 2015, pending subsequent confirmation by the 18th Central Committee at its next plenary session. The decision was then ratified ex post by the 5th Plenary Session of the 18th Central Committee, held on 26–29 October 2015.)	余远辉	Alternate	Nonmember	1964	1984	Alive	Guangxi	Yao	Male	
19	Chen Wu (Note: Chen Wu was advanced from alternate to member of the 18th Central Committee to fill a vacant seat by a decision of the 3rd Plenary Session of the 17th Central Committee, held on 9–12 October 2008.)	陈武	Nonmember	Member	1954	1975	Alive	Guangxi	Zhuang	Male	
20	Chen Mingming (Note: Chen Mingming was advanced from alternate to member of the 18th Central Committee to fill a vacant seat by a decision of the 3rd Plenary Session of the 17th Central Committee, held on 9–12 October 2008.)	陈鸣明	Nonmember	Nonmember	1957	1976	Alive	Guizhou	Bouyei	Male	
21	Zhu Yanfeng	竺延风	Alternate	Nonmember	1961	1982	Alive	Zhejiang	Han	Male	
22	Zheng Qunliang	郑群良	Nonmember	Nonmember	1954	—	Alive	Liaoning	Han	Male	
23	Zhao Jin	赵金	Nonmember	Nonmember	1962	1987	Alive	Yunnan	Yi	Male	
24	Zhao Lixiong (Note: Zhao Lixiong was advanced from alternate to member of the 18th Central Committee to fill a vacant seat by a decision of the 3rd Plenary Session of the 17th Central Committee, held on 9–12 October 2008.)	赵立雄	Nonmember	Nonmember	1956	1984	Alive	Yunnan	Bai	Male	
25	Zhao Shucong (Note: Zhao Shucong was advanced from alternate to member of the 18th Central Committee to fill a vacant seat by a decision of the 3rd Plenary Session of the 17th Central Committee, held on 9–12 October 2008.)	赵树丛	Nonmember	Nonmember	1955	1973	Alive	Shandong	Han	Male	
26	Duan Chunhua (Note: Duan Chunhua was advanced from alternate to member of the 18th Central Committee to fill a vacant seat by a decision of the 3rd Plenary Session of the 17th Central Committee, held on 9–12 October 2008.)	段春华	Nonmember	Alternate	1959	1983	Alive	Hebei	Han	Male	
27	Losang Gyaltsen (Note: Losang Gyaltsen was advanced from alternate to member of the 18th Central Committee to fill a vacant seat by a decision of the 3rd Plenary Session of the 17th Central Committee, held on 9–12 October 2008.)	洛桑江村	Nonmember	Member	1957	1978	Alive	Tibet	Tibetan	Male	
28	Qian Zhimin	钱智民	Nonmember	Alternate	1960	1985	Alive	Jiangsu	Han	Male	
29	Gao Jin	高津	Nonmember	Member	1959	1980	Alive	Jiangsu	Han	Male	
30	Gao Guangbin	高广滨	Nonmember	Alternate	1963	1984	Alive	Heilongjiang	Han	Male	
31	Liang Guoyang	梁国扬	Nonmember	Nonmember	1951	1982	Alive	Taiwan	Han	Male	
32	Shen Yiqin	谌贻琴	Alternate	Member	1959	1985	Alive	Guizhou	Bai	Female	
33	Han Yong	韩勇	Nonmember	Nonmember	1956	1976	Alive	Jilin	Han	Male	
34	Lan Tianli	蓝天立	Nonmember	Alternate	1962	1985	Alive	Guangxi	Zhuang	Male	
35	Zhan Wenlong	詹文龙	Alternate	Nonmember	1955	—	Alive	Fujian	Han	Male	
36	Pan Liangshi	潘良时	Nonmember	Nonmember	1956	1974	Alive	Hebei	Han	Male	
37	Ai Husheng	艾虎生	Alternate	Nonmember	1951	—	Alive	Henan	Han	Male	
38	Danke	旦科	Alternate	Nonmember	1962	1988	Alive	Qinghai	Tibetan	Male	
39	Ren Xuefeng	任学锋	Nonmember	Alternate	1965	1985	Alive	Hebei	Han	Male	
40	Liu Sheng	刘胜	Nonmember	Nonmember	1956	—	Alive	Hunan	Han	Male	
41	Liu Hui	刘慧	Alternate	Nonmember	1959	1985	Alive	Tianjin	Hui	Female	
42	Li Shixiang	李士祥	Nonmember	Nonmember	1958	1982	Alive	Beijing	Han	Male	
43	Li Baoshan	李宝善	Nonmember	Nonmember	1955	1978	Alive	Shanxi	Han	Male	
44	Li Jiayang	李家洋	Nonmember	Nonmember	1956	1982	Alive	Anhui	Han	Male	
45	Yang Yue	杨岳	Nonmember	Nonmember	1968	1986	Alive	Liaoning	Han	Male	
46	Yang Xuejun	杨学军	Nonmember	Member	1963	—	Alive	Shandong	Han	Male	
47	Zhang Jie	张杰	Alternate	Nonmember	1958	—	Alive	Hebei	Han	Male	
48	Zhang Daili	张岱梨	Alternate	Nonmember	1954	1974	Alive	Shandong	Han	Female	
49	Zhang Jianping	张建平	Nonmember	Nonmember	1956	—	Alive	Jiangsu	Han	Male	
50	Chen Chuanping (Note: Chen Chuanping was found guilty of corruption on 23 August 2014. Following deliberation by the Standing Committee of the 18th Central Commission for Discipline Inspection, his removal as an alternate of the 18th Central Committee was proposed to the 18th Politburo. The Politburo adopted the recommendation in February 2015, pending subsequent confirmation by the 18th Central Committee at its next plenary session. The decision was then ratified ex post by the 5th Plenary Session of the 18th Central Committee, held on 26–29 October 2015.)	陈川平	Alternate	Nonmember	1962	1985	Alive	Shanxi	Han	Male	
51	Hao Peng	郝鹏	Nonmember	Member	1960	1982	Alive	Shaanxi	Han	Male	
52	Ke Zunping	柯尊平	Nonmember	Nonmember	1956	1975	Alive	Shaanxi	Han	Male	
53	Lou Qinjian	娄勤俭	Nonmember	Member	1956	1975	Alive	Guizhou	Han	Male	
54	Yao Yinliang	姚引良	Nonmember	Nonmember	1956	1975	Alive	Shaanxi	Han	Male	
55	Xia Jie	夏杰	Nonmember	Nonmember	1960	1985	Alive	Shandong	Hui	Female	
56	Xu Songnan	徐松南	Nonmember	Nonmember	1956	1979	Alive	Anhui	Han	Male	
57	Jiang Weilie	蒋伟烈	Nonmember	Nonmember	1955	—	Alive	Jiangsu	Han	Male	
58	Wan Lijun	万立骏	Nonmember	Member	1957	—	Alive	Liaoning	Han	Male	
59	Wang Huizhong	王辉忠	Nonmember	Nonmember	1956	1978	Alive	Zhejiang	Han	Male	
60	Niu Zhizhong (Note: Niu Zhizhong was found guilty of corruption in April 2016. Following deliberation by the Standing Committee of the 18th Central Commission for Discipline Inspection, his removal as an alternate of the 18th Central Committee was proposed to the 18th Politburo. The Politburo adopted the recommendation in 2016, pending subsequent confirmation by the 18th Central Committee at its next plenary session. The decision was then ratified ex post by the 6th Plenary Session of the 18th Central Committee, held on 24–27 October 2016.)	牛志忠	Nonmember	Nonmember	1955	—	Alive	Hebei	Han	Male	
61	Deng Kai	邓凯	Nonmember	Nonmember	1959	1986	Alive	Liaoning	Han	Male	
62	Ye Hongzhuan	叶红专	Nonmember	Nonmember	1958	1976	Alive	Hunan	Tujia	Male	
63	Erkenjan Turahun	尔肯江·吐拉洪	Nonmember	Nonmember	1964	1985	Alive	Xinjiang	Uyghur	Male	
64	Liu Yuting	刘玉亭	Nonmember	Nonmember	1956	1982	Alive	Henan	Han	Male	
65	Liu Shiquan	刘石泉	Alternate	Alternate	1963	1985	Alive	Hubei	Han	Male	
66	Li Kang	李康	Alternate	Nonmember	1957	1981	Alive	Guangxi	Zhuang	Female	
67	Li Changping	李昌平	Nonmember	Nonmember	1961	1982	Alive	Sichuan	Tibetan	Male	
68	Yang Weize (Note: Yang Weize was found guilty of corruption on 4 January 2015. Following deliberation by the Standing Committee of the 18th Central Commission for Discipline Inspection, his removal as an alternate of the 18th Central Committee was proposed to the 18th Politburo. The Politburo adopted the recommendation in July 2015, pending subsequent confirmation by the 18th Central Committee at its next plenary session. The decision was then ratified ex post by the 5th Plenary Session of the 18th Central Committee, held on 26–29 October 2015.)	杨卫泽	Nonmember	Nonmember	1962	1988	Alive	Jiangsu	Han	Male	
69	Chen Zuoning	陈左宁	Alternate	Nonmember	1957	—	Alive	Beijing	Han	Female	
70	Nurlan Abelmanjen	努尔兰·阿不都满金	Nonmember	Member	1962	1985	Alive	Xinjiang	Kazakh	Male	
71	Lin Duo	林铎	Nonmember	Member	1956	1975	Alive	Shandong	Han	Male	
72	Jin Zhuanglong	金壮龙	Alternate	Member	1964	1984	Alive	Zhejiang	Han	Male	
73	Zhao Aiming	赵爱明	Alternate	Alternate	1961	1985	Alive	Henan	Han	Female	
74	Qin Yizhi	秦宜智	Nonmember	Nonmember	1965	1985	Alive	Henan	Han	Male	
75	Qin Yinhe	秦银河	Alternate	Nonmember	1951	—	Alive	Henan	Han	Male	
76	Gao Jianguo	高建国	Nonmember	Nonmember	1954	1972	Alive	Shandong	Han	Male	
77	Guo Jianbo	郭剑波	Nonmember	Nonmember	1960	—	Alive	Hunan	Han	Male	
78	Huang Kunming	黄坤明	Nonmember	Member	1956	1976	Alive	Fujian	Han	Male	
79	Huang Xinchu	黄新初	Nonmember	Nonmember	1957	1984	Alive	Hubei	Han	Male	
80	Cao Shumin	曹淑敏	Nonmember	Alternate	1966	1990	Alive	Hebei	Han	Female	
81	Ge Huijun	葛慧君	Nonmember	Alternate	1963	1982	Alive	Zhejiang	Han	Female	
82	Zeng Wei	曾维	Nonmember	Nonmember	1956	1977	Alive	Liaoning	Han	Male	
83	Yu Weiguo	于伟国	Nonmember	Member	1955	1975	Alive	Shandong	Han	Male	
84	Wang Ning	王宁	Nonmember	Nonmember	1955	—	Alive	Shandong	Han	Male	
85	Wang Jun	王军	Nonmember	Member	1958	1977	Alive	Henan	Han	Male	
86	Wang Jian	王健	Nonmember	Nonmember	1954	—	Alive	Henan	Han	Male	
87	Lü Xiwen (Note: Lü Xiwen was found guilty of corruption on 11 November 2015. Following deliberation by the Standing Committee of the 18th Central Commission for Discipline Inspection, his removal as an alternate of the 18th Central Committee was proposed to the 18th Politburo. The Politburo adopted the recommendation in July 2016, pending subsequent confirmation by the 18th Central Committee at its next plenary session. The decision was then ratified ex post by the 6th Plenary Session of the 18th Central Committee, held on 24–27 October 2016.)	吕锡文	Nonmember	Nonmember	1955	1982	Alive	Zhejiang	Han	Female	
88	Ruan Chengfa	阮成发	Nonmember	Member	1957	1982	Alive	Hubei	Han	Male	
89	Li Xi	李希	Alternate	Member	1956	1975	Alive	Gansu	Han	Male	
90	Li Qun	李群	Nonmember	Alternate	1962	1984	Alive	Shandong	Han	Male	
91	Li Yunfeng (Note: Li Yunfeng was found guilty of corruption on 30 May 2016. Following deliberation by the Standing Committee of the 18th Central Commission for Discipline Inspection, his removal as an alternate of the 18th Central Committee was proposed to the 18th Politburo. The Politburo adopted the recommendation in April 2017, pending subsequent confirmation by the 18th Central Committee at its next plenary session. The decision was then ratified ex post by the 7th Plenary Session of the 18th Central Committee, held on 11–14 October 2017.)	李云峰	Nonmember	Nonmember	1957	1981	Alive	Jiangsu	Han	Male	
92	Li Guoying	李国英	Nonmember	Member	1964	1988	Alive	Henan	Han	Male	
93	Wu Manqing	吴曼青	Nonmember	Nonmember	1965	—	Alive	Anhui	Han	Male	
94	Shen Suli	沈素琍	Alternate	Nonmember	1958	1979	Alive	Jiangsu	Han	Female	
95	Fan Changmi (Note: Fan Changmi was found guilty of corruption in December 2014. Following deliberation by the Standing Committee of the 18th Central Commission for Discipline Inspection, his removal as an alternate of the 18th Central Committee was proposed to the 18th Politburo. The Politburo adopted the recommendation on an unknown date, pending subsequent confirmation by the 18th Central Committee at its next plenary session. The decision was then ratified ex post by the 6th Plenary Session of the 18th Central Committee, held on 24–27 October 2016.)	范长秘	Nonmember	Nonmember	1955	1974	Alive	Shandong	Han	Male	
96	Ouyang Jian	欧阳坚	Nonmember	Nonmember	1957	1986	Alive	Yunnan	Bai	Male	
97	Zhao Yupei	赵玉沛	Nonmember	Alternate	1954	—	Alive	Jilin	Han	Male	
98	Huang Lixin	黄莉新	Nonmember	Alternate	1962	1983	Alive	Jiangsu	Han	Female	
99	Gong Ke	龚克	Nonmember	Nonmember	1955	1981	Alive	Hunan	Han	Male	
100	Liang Liming	梁黎明	Nonmember	Nonmember	1961	1983	Alive	Zhejiang	Han	Female	
101	Dao Linyin	刀林荫	Alternate	Nonmember	1959	1987	Alive	Yunnan	Dai	Female	
102	Ma Weiming	马伟明	Nonmember	Alternate	1960	—	Alive	Jiangsu	Han	Male	
103	Wang Min (Note: Wang Min was found guilty of corruption on 18 December 2014. Following deliberation by the Standing Committee of the 18th Central Commission for Discipline Inspection, his removal as an alternate of the 18th Central Committee was proposed to the 18th Politburo. The Politburo adopted the recommendation in February 2015, pending subsequent confirmation by the 18th Central Committee at its next plenary session. The decision was then ratified ex post by the 5th Plenary Session of the 18th Central Committee, held on 26–29 October 2015.)	王敏	Nonmember	Nonmember	1956	1975	Alive	Shandong	Han	Male	
104	Wang Wentao	王文涛	Nonmember	Alternate	1964	1994	Alive	Jiangsu	Han	Male	
105	Niu Hongguang	牛红光	Nonmember	Nonmember	1951	—	Alive	Shandong	Han	Male	
106	Mao Chaofeng	毛超峰	Nonmember	Nonmember	1965	1986	Alive	Henan	Han	Male	
107	Gongpo Tashi	公保扎西	Nonmember	Nonmember	1962	1983	Alive	Qinghai	Tibetan	Male	
108	Zhu Shanlu	朱善璐	Nonmember	Nonmember	1953	1978	Alive	Liaoning	Han	Male	
109	Ren Hongbin	任洪斌	Nonmember	Alternate	1963	—	Alive	Jilin	Han	Male	
110	Tang Tao	汤涛	Alternate	Nonmember	1962	1984	Alive	Hubei	Han	Male	
111	Li Jincheng	李金城	Alternate	Nonmember	1963	1988	2022	Anhui	Han	Male	
112	Li Xiansheng	李宪生	Nonmember	Nonmember	1954	1973	Alive	Shanxi	Han	Male	
113	Li Peilin	李培林	Nonmember	Nonmember	1955	—	Alive	Shandong	Han	Male	
114	Wu Zhenglong	吴政隆	Nonmember	Member	1964	1987	Alive	Jiangsu	Han	Male	
115	Zhang Xiaoming	张晓明	Nonmember	Member	1963	—	Alive	Jiangsu	Han	Male	
116	Zhang Xiwu (Note: Zhang Xiwu was found guilty of corruption on 3 July 2017. Following deliberation by the Standing Committee of the 18th Central Commission for Discipline Inspection, his removal as an alternate of the 18th Central Committee was proposed to the 18th Politburo. The Politburo adopted the recommendation on an unknown date, pending subsequent confirmation by the 18th Central Committee at its next plenary session. The decision was then ratified ex post by the 7th Plenary Session of the 18th Central Committee, held on 11–14 October 2017.)	张喜武	Nonmember	Nonmember	1958	—	Alive	Inner Mongolia	Han	Male	
117	Zhang Ruimin	张瑞敏	Alternate	Nonmember	1949	1976	Alive	Shandong	Han	Male	
118	Zhang Ruiqing	张瑞清	Nonmember	Nonmember	1955	—	Alive	Hebei	Han	Male	
119	Shang Yong	尚勇	Nonmember	Nonmember	1957	1981	Alive	Shandong	Han	Male	
120	Hu Heping	胡和平	Nonmember	Member	1962	1982	Alive	Shandong	Han	Male	
121	Ni Yuefeng	倪岳峰	Nonmember	Member	1964	1985	Alive	Anhui	Han	Male	
122	Yin Fanglong	殷方龙	Nonmember	Nonmember	1953	—	Alive	Jiangsu	Han	Male	
123	Cao Guangjing	曹广晶	Nonmember	Nonmember	1964	1991	Alive	Shandong	Han	Male	
124	Lei Chunmei	雷春美	Alternate	Nonmember	1959	1978	Alive	Fujian	She	Female	
125	Wang Yongchun (Note: Wang Yongchun was found guilty of corruption on 26 August 2013. Following deliberation by the Standing Committee of the 18th Central Commission for Discipline Inspection, his removal as an alternate of the 18th Central Committee was proposed to the 18th Politburo. The Politburo adopted the recommendation in June 2014, pending subsequent confirmation by the 18th Central Committee at its next plenary session. The decision was then ratified ex post by the 4th Plenary Session of the 18th Central Committee, held on 20–23 October 2014.)	王永春	Nonmember	Nonmember	1960	—	Alive	Jilin	Han	Male	
126	Xu Linping	许林平	Nonmember	Nonmember	1957	—	Alive	Hunan	Han	Male	
127	Sun Jinlong	孙金龙	Nonmember	Member	1962	1986	Alive	Hubei	Han	Male	
128	Jin Donghan	金东寒	Nonmember	Alternate	1961	1984	Alive	Heilongjiang	Han	Male	
129	He Fuchu	贺福初	Nonmember	Nonmember	1962	—	Alive	Hunan	Han	Male	
130	Xia Deren	夏德仁	Nonmember	Nonmember	1955	—	Alive	Shandong	Han	Male	
131	E Jingping	鄂竟平	Nonmember	Member	1956	1977	Alive	Shandong	Han	Male	
132	Jiang Chaoliang	蒋超良	Nonmember	Member	1957	1981	Alive	Hunan	Han	Male	
133	Ma Zhengqi	马正其	Nonmember	Nonmember	1959	1976	Alive	Chongqing	Han	Male	
134	Shi Taifeng	石泰峰	Nonmember	Member	1956	1982	Alive	Shanxi	Han	Male	
135	Li Yumei	李玉妹	Alternate	Nonmember	1956	1974	Alive	Shandong	Han	Female	
136	Yang Hui	杨晖	Nonmember	Nonmember	1963	—	Alive	Shandong	Han	Male	
137	Wu Changhai	吴长海	Nonmember	Nonmember	1954	—	Alive	Liaoning	Han	Male	
138	Song Liping	宋丽萍	Nonmember	Nonmember	1962	—	Alive	Shanxi	Han	Female	
139	Zhang Yesui	张业遂	Nonmember	Nonmember	1953	—	Alive	Hubei	Han	Male	
140	Chen Run'er	陈润儿	Alternate	Member	1957	1975	Alive	Hunan	Han	Male	
141	Jiang Jianqing	姜建清	Alternate	Nonmember	1953	1983	Alive	Shanghai	Han	Male	
142	Mei Kebao	梅克保	Alternate	Nonmember	1957	1979	Alive	Hunan	Han	Male	
143	Pan Yiyang (Note: Pan Yiyang was found guilty of corruption on 17 September 2014. Following deliberation by the Standing Committee of the 18th Central Commission for Discipline Inspection, his removal as an alternate of the 18th Central Committee was proposed to the 18th Politburo. The Politburo adopted the recommendation on an unknown date, pending subsequent confirmation by the 18th Central Committee at its next plenary session. The decision was then ratified ex post by the 5th Plenary Session of the 18th Central Committee, held on 26–29 October 2015.)	潘逸阳	Nonmember	Nonmember	1961	1984	Alive	Guangdong	Han	Male	
144	Ding Xuexiang	丁薛祥	Nonmember	Member	1962	1984	Alive	Jiangsu	Han	Male	
145	Ulan	乌兰	Alternate	Alternate	1962	1984	Alive	Inner Mongolia	Mongolian	Female	
146	Sun Shougang	孙守刚	Nonmember	Nonmember	1965	1984	Alive	Shandong	Han	Male	
147	Li Jia	李佳	Nonmember	Alternate	1961	1985	Alive	Liaoning	Han	Male	
148	Zhao Yong	赵勇	Alternate	Nonmember	1963	1982	Alive	Hunan	Han	Male	
149	Xu Lejiang	徐乐江	Alternate	Member	1959	1976	Alive	Shandong	Han	Male	
150	Cao Qing	曹清	Alternate	Nonmember	1952	—	Alive	Hebei	Han	Male	
151	Cai Zhenhua	蔡振华	Alternate	Nonmember	1961	1997	Alive	Jiangsu	Han	Male	
152	Wan Qingliang (Note: Wan Qingliang was found guilty of corruption on 27 June 2014. Following deliberation by the Standing Committee of the 18th Central Commission for Discipline Inspection, his removal as an alternate of the 18th Central Committee was proposed to the 18th Politburo. The Politburo adopted the recommendation on 9 October 2014, pending subsequent confirmation by the 18th Central Committee at its next plenary session. The decision was then ratified ex post by the 4th Plenary Session of the 18th Central Committee, held on 20–23 October 2014.)	万庆良	Nonmember	Nonmember	1964	1986	Alive	Guangdong	Han	Male	
153	Yin Li	尹力	Nonmember	Member	1962	1983	Alive	Shandong	Han	Male	
154	Du Jiahao	杜家毫	Nonmember	Member	1955	1973	Alive	Zhejiang	Han	Male	
155	Li Chuncheng (Note: Li Chuncheng was found guilty of corruption on 6 December 2012. Following deliberation by the Standing Committee of the 18th Central Commission for Discipline Inspection, his removal as an alternate of the 18th Central Committee was proposed to the 18th Politburo. The Politburo adopted the recommendation on 29 April 2014, pending subsequent confirmation by the 18th Central Committee at its next plenary session. The decision was then ratified ex post by the 4th Plenary Session of the 18th Central Committee, held on 20–23 October 2014.)	李春城	Nonmember	Nonmember	1956	1978	Alive	Liaoning	Han	Male	
156	He Lifeng	何立峰	Alternate	Member	1955	1981	Alive	Guangdong	Han	Male	
157	Chen Gang	陈刚	Nonmember	Nonmember	1966	1987	Alive	Hubei	Han	Male	
158	Wang Rong	王荣	Alternate	Nonmember	1958	1976	Alive	Jiangsu	Han	Male	
159	Ji Lin	吉林	Alternate	Nonmember	1962	1984	Alive	Shanghai	Han	Male	
160	Liu Jian	刘剑	Nonmember	Nonmember	1970	1991	Alive	Shandong	Han	Male	
161	Li Bing	李冰	Nonmember	Nonmember	1949	1972	Alive	Heilongjiang	Han	Male	
162	Zhang Xuan	张轩	Alternate	Nonmember	1958	1979	Alive	Hebei	Han	Female	
163	Hu Xiaolian	胡晓炼	Alternate	Nonmember	1958	—	Alive	Hubei	Han	Female	
164	Guo Mingyi	郭明义	Nonmember	Alternate	1958	1980	Alive	Liaoning	Han	Male	
165	Wang Xiaochu	王晓初	Alternate	Nonmember	1958	—	Alive	Shandong	Han	Male	
166	Jiang Xiaojuan	江小涓	Nonmember	Nonmember	1957	—	Alive	Shaanxi	Han	Female	
167	Wang Hongzhang	王洪章	Nonmember	Nonmember	1954	—	Alive	Liaoning	Han	Male	
168	Hu Huaibang	胡怀邦	Nonmember	Nonmember	1955	1981	Alive	Henan	Han	Male	
169	Yi Xiaoguang	乙晓光	Nonmember	Member	1958	—	Alive	Jiangsu	Han	Male	
170	Qiu He (Note: Qiu He was found guilty of corruption on 15 March 2015. Following deliberation by the Standing Committee of the 18th Central Commission for Discipline Inspection, his removal as an alternate of the 18th Central Committee was proposed to the 18th Politburo. The Politburo adopted the recommendation on 31 July 2015, pending subsequent confirmation by the 18th Central Committee at its next plenary session. The decision was then ratified ex post by the 5th Plenary Session of the 18th Central Committee, held on 26–29 October 2015.)	仇和	Nonmember	Nonmember	1957	1977	Alive	Jiangsu	Han	Male	
171	Li Xiaopeng	李小鹏	Nonmember	Member	1959	1985	Alive	Sichuan	Han	Male	
