= Zhang Zulin =

Chinese politician

- 张祖林

Vice Governor of Yunnan
- In office August 2014 – January 2018
- Governor: Li Jiheng; Chen Hao; Ruan Chengfa

Communist Party Secretary of Yuxi
- In office December 2012 – September 2014
- Deputy: Gao Jinsong; Rao Nanhu
- Preceded by: Kong Xianggeng
- Succeeded by: Luo Yingguang

Mayor of Kunming
- In office May 2007 – December 2012
- Party Secretary: Qiu He; Zhang Tianxin
- Preceded by: Wang Wentao
- Succeeded by: Li Wenrong

Mayor of Lijiang
- In office June 2005 – May 2007
- Party Secretary: He Zixing
- Preceded by: He Zixing
- Succeeded by: Wang Junzheng

Personal details
- Born: June 1959 (age 67) Zhaotong, Yunnan, China
- Party: Chinese Communist Party (1985–2024; expelled)
- Education: Yunnan University; Cheung Kong Graduate School of Business; Tongji University

Chinese name
- Simplified Chinese: 张祖林
- Traditional Chinese: 張祖林
Transcriptions
Standard Mandarin
- Hanyu Pinyin: Zhāng Zǔlín

Zhang Zulin (Chinese: 张祖林; born June 1959) is a former Chinese politician who spent his entire career in southwest China's Yunnan province. As of March 2023 he was under investigation by China's top graft busters. Previously he served as vice governor of Yunnan.

He was a delegate to the 11th National People's Congress.

== Early life and education ==
Zhang was born in June 1959 in Zhaotong, Yunnan. After the Cultural Revolution, he was a sent-down youth for a short time from September 1977 to February 1978. After resuming the college entrance examination, in 1978, he enrolled at the Department of Physics, Yunnan University, where he majored in radio.

== Career ==
After graduating in January 1982, he was assigned to Zhaotong TV Station for a year. In March 1983, he became a reporter from Yunnan Television Station, a position he held until October 1990, when he was promoted to deputy director of the Editorial Office.

Zhang joined the Chinese Communist Party (CCP) in March 1985, and got involved in politics in August 1991. In 1991, he became deputy magistrate of Yongren County, rising to magistrate in 1993. He was vice governor of Chuxiong Yi Autonomous Prefecture in February 1995, and held that office until June 2000. He served as deputy director of Yunnan Provincial Quality and Technical Supervision Bureau in June 2000, and two years later promoted to the director position. In June 2005, he was named acting mayor of Lijiang, confirmed in May 2007. He was appointed mayor of Kunming in November 2007, concurrently serving as deputy party secretary. In December 2012, he was promoted to party secretary of Yuxi. It would be his first job as "first-in-charge" of a prefecture-level city. He was chosen as vice governor of Yunnan in August 2014, a post he kept until January 2018.

== Downfall ==
On 1 March 2024, he has come under investigation for "serious violations of discipline and laws" by the Central Commission for Discipline Inspection (CCDI), the CCP's internal disciplinary body, and the National Supervisory Commission, the highest anti-corruption agency of China. Qiu He and Zhang Tianxin, both were his superiors in Kunming, were sacked for graft. On September 12, he was expelled from the CCP. On September 23, he was arrested by the Supreme People's Procuratorate for suspected bribe taking. On December 25, he was indicted on suspicion of accepting bribes.

On 26 June 2025, prosecutors accused Zhang of taking advantage of his positions in Yunnan between 2001 and 2023 to assist individuals and organizations in matters related to real estate development, project contracting, project approval, and obtaining loans, in return, he accepted money and gifts worth more than 122 million yuan ($17.03 million) personally or through his family members. Zhang was sentenced to life imprisonment, and was deprived of political rights for life and all his properties were also confiscated.

Government offices
| Preceded by He Zixing | Mayor of Lijiang; 2005–2007 | Succeeded by Wang Junzheng |
| Preceded by Wang Wentao | Mayor of Kunming; 2007–2012 | Succeeded by Li Wenrong |
Party political offices
| Preceded by Kong Xianggeng | Communist Party Secretary of Yuxi; 2012–2014 | Succeeded by Luo Yingguang |
