= Wang Xiliang =

Chinese politician

- 王喜良

Mayor of Kunming
- In office January 2016 – January 2021
- Party Secretary: Cheng Lianyuan
- Preceded by: Li Wenrong
- Succeeded by: Liu Jiachen

Personal details
- Born: December 1963 (age 62) Huanggang County, Hubei, China
- Party: Chinese Communist Party (1990-2025, expelled)
- Education: Wuhan Institute of Technology; Kunming University of Science and Technology

Wang Xiliang (Chinese: 王喜良; pinyin: Wáng Xǐliáng; born December 1963) is a former Chinese politician who spent most his entire career in southwest China's Yunnan province. He was investigated by China's top anti-graft agency in April 2024. Previously he served as vice chairperson of the Finance and Economic Committee of the Yunnan Provincial People's Congress and before that, mayor of Kunming, capital of Yunnan province. He was a delegate to the 13th National People's Congress.

== Early life and education ==
Wang was born in Huanggang County, Hubei, in December 1963. After resuming the college entrance examination, in 1979, he enrolled at Wuhan University of Chemical Technology (now Wuhan Institute of Technology), where he majored in chemical beneficiation. After graduating in 1983, Wang taught at Lianyungang Chemical Mining Vocational School. From 1985 to 1988, he did his postgraduate work at Kunming Institute of Technology (now Kunming University of Science and Technology). Beginning in May 1988, he served in several posts in Yunnan Metallurgical Research and Design Institute (later was reshuffled as Kunming Metallurgical Research Institute), including engineer, vice president, and president.

== Political career ==
Wang joined the Chinese Communist Party (CCP) in December 1990, and got involved in politics in December 2002, when he was appointed vice mayor of Qujing. In March 2007, he became deputy director of Yunnan Economics Committee (later was reshuffled as Yunnan Provincial Development and Reform Commission), rising to director in January 2013. In October 2015, he was named acting mayor of Kunming, confirmed in January 2016. He was also deputy party secretary. In January 2021, he took office as vice chairperson of the Finance and Economic Committee of the Yunnan Provincial People's Congress, but having held the position for only a year.

== Investigation ==
In February 2022, Wang was subjected to a two-year probation period within the Party, removed from his government positions, and demoted to the rank of second-level researcher for damaging the integrity of the Dianchi Lake ecosystem due to real estate development.

On 29 April 2024, he was suspected of "serious violations of laws and regulations" by the Central Commission for Discipline Inspection (CCDI), the party's internal disciplinary body, and the National Supervisory Commission, the highest anti-corruption agency of China. Wang was expelled from the party on 18 February 2025.

Government offices
Preceded by Mi Dongsheng	Director of Yunnan Provincial Development and Reform Commission; 2013–2015	Succeeded by Yang Hongbo
Preceded by Li Wenrong	Mayor of Kunming; 2016–2021	Succeeded by Liu Jiachen
