= Gong Jianhua =

Chinese politician

- 龚建华

Vice Chairman of the Standing Committee of Jiangxi Provincial People's Congress
- In office January 2017 – November 2021
- Chairman: Lu Xinshe; Liu Qi

Communist Party Secretary of Nanchang
- In office March 2015 – November 2016
- Deputy: Guo An (mayor)
- Preceded by: Wang Wentao
- Succeeded by: Yin Meigen

Secretary-General of CCP Jiangxi Provincial Committee
- In office October 2014 – March 2015
- Party Secretary: Qiang Wei
- Preceded by: Zhao Zhiyong
- Succeeded by: Zhu Hong

Communist Party Secretary of Fuzhou
- In office August 2011 – October 2014
- Deputy: Zhang Heping (mayor)
- Preceded by: Gan Liangmiao
- Succeeded by: Xiao Yi

Mayor of Yichun
- In office November 2006 – August 2011
- Party Secretary: Song Chenguang; Xie Yisen
- Preceded by: Yang Xianping
- Succeeded by: Jiang Bin

Communist Party Secretary of Jiangling Motors
- In office June 2003 – February 2004
- Preceded by: Sun Min
- Succeeded by: Jiang Linsheng

Personal details
- Born: June 1962 (age 64) Nanchang County, Jiangxi, China
- Party: Chinese Communist Party
- Education: Jiangxi University of Finance and Economics

Chinese name
- Simplified Chinese: 龚建华
- Traditional Chinese: 龔建華
Transcriptions
Standard Mandarin
- Hanyu Pinyin: Gōng Jiànhuá

Gong Jianhua (Chinese: 龚建华; born June 1962) is a former Chinese politician who spent his entire career in his home-province Jiangxi. He surrendered himself to and is cooperating with the Central Commission for Discipline Inspection (CCDI) and National Supervisory Commission for investigation of "suspected violations of disciplines and laws" on 29 November 2021. Previously he served as vice chairman of the Standing Committee of Jiangxi Provincial People's Congress. Gong is the fourth vice-provincial level official in Jiangxi to be targeted by China's top anticorruption watchdog since the 19th National Congress of the Chinese Communist Party, behind Li Yihuang, Shi Wenqing and Xiao Yi.

== Early life and education ==
Gong was born in Nanchang County, Jiangxi, in June 1962. After resuming the college entrance examination in 1979, he was admitted to Jiangxi University of Finance and Economics, majoring in economics.

== Career ==
Gong worked in government after university in 1983, and joined the Chinese Communist Party (CCP) in October 1984. After working in the Rural Work Department of CCP Jiangxi Provincial Committee and the Jiangxi Provincial Agriculture and Rural Development Department for 17 years, he was elevated to vice mayor of Nanchang, capital of Jiangxi. In December 2002, he was appointed secretary of Nanchang Municipal Political and Legal Affairs Commission, concurrently serving as deputy party secretary of Nanchang and party secretary of Jiangling Motors since January 2004. In January 2006, he was named acting mayor of Yichun, replacing Yang Xianping. He was installed as mayor the next month. In August 2011, he was promoted to become party secretary of Fuzhou, and served until October 2014, when he was transferred back to Nanchang as secretary-general of CCP Jiangxi Provincial Committee. His predecessor Zhao Zhiyong was probed on suspicion of "serious violations of laws and regulations" on June 3. He was appointed party secretary of Nanchang in March 2015 and was admitted to member of the standing committee of the CCP Jiangxi Provincial Committee, the province's top authority. In January 2017, he took office as vice chairman of the Standing Committee of Jiangxi Provincial People's Congress, and held that office until 29 November 2021, when he handed himself in to the Central Commission for Discipline Inspection (CCDI), the party's internal disciplinary body, and the National Supervisory Commission, the highest anti-corruption agency of China. His colleague Shi Wenqing, also vice chairman of the Standing Committee of Jiangxi Provincial People's Congress, had been placed under investigation in September 2020. His successor Xiao Yi was put under investigation in May 2021.

He was a delegate to the 11th National People's Congress.

Party political offices
| Preceded by Sun Min (孙敏) | Communist Party Secretary of Jiangling Motors; 2003–2004 | Succeeded by Jiang Linsheng (蒋林生) |
| Preceded by Gan Liangmiao | Communist Party Secretary of Fuzhou; 2011–2014 | Succeeded by Xiao Yi |
| Preceded by Zhao Zhiyong | Secretary-General of CCP Jiangxi Provincial Committee; 2014–2015 | Succeeded by Zhu Hong |
| Preceded by Wang Wentao | Communist Party Secretary of Nanchang; 2015–2016 | Succeeded by Yin Meigen |
Government offices
| Preceded by Yang Xianping | Mayor of Yichun; 2006–2011 | Succeeded by Jiang Bin (蒋斌) |
