= Li Wenrong =

Chinese politician

- 李文荣

Vice Chairperson of the Yunnan Provincial People's Congress
- In office January 2022 – March 2025
- Chairperson: Wang Ning

Personal details
- Born: October 1962 (age 63–64) Zhaotong, Yunnan, China
- Party: Chinese Communist Party (1984–2025; expelled)
- Education: Hunan University; Yunnan University

Chinese name
- Simplified Chinese: 李文荣
- Traditional Chinese: 李文榮
Transcriptions
Standard Mandarin
- Hanyu Pinyin: Lǐ Wénróng

Li Wenrong (Chinese: 李文荣; born October 1962) is a former Chinese politician who spent most of his career in southwest China's Yunnan province. He was investigated by China's top anti-graft agency in March 2025. Previously he served as vice chairperson of the Yunnan Provincial People's Congress.

He was a representative of the 19th National Congress of the Chinese Communist Party and was a delegate to the 12th National People's Congress.

== Early life and education ==
Li was born in Zhaotong, Yunnan, in October 1962. In 1980, he enrolled at Hunan University, where he majored in machine manufacturing. He joined the Chinese Communist Party (CCP) in March 1984 upon graduation. He did his postgraduate work at Yunnan University in 1997.

== Career ==
After graduation in August 1984, Li became a technician at Kunming Machine Tool Factory (now Kunming Machinery Industry Group Co., Ltd.). At, there, he eventually became deputy party secretary in October 2000.

Li began his political career in December 2002, when he was appointed vice governor of Wenshan Zhuang and Miao Autonomous Prefecture. He became executive vice governor in June 2006 and was admitted to standing committee member of the CCP Wenshan Zhuang and Miao Autonomous Prefectural Committee, the prefecture's top authority. He successively served in Kunming as vice mayor in December 2007, executive vice mayor in June 2008, deputy director of Yunnan Provincial Commission of Industry and Information Technology in November 2011, and mayor in December 2012. He was party secretary of Qujing, the top political position in the city, beginning in October 2015. He was admitted to standing committee member of the CCP Yunnan Provincial Committee, the province's top authority, in December 2016. In January 2022, he rose to become vice chairperson of the Yunnan Provincial People's Congress, the province's top legislative body.

== Downfall ==
On 18 March 2025, Li was suspected of "serious violations of laws and regulations" by the Central Commission for Discipline Inspection (CCDI), the party's internal disciplinary body, and the National Supervisory Commission, the highest anti-corruption agency of China. He is the fourth mayor of Kunming to be targeted by China's top anticorruption watchdog since Xi Jinping's continues an anti-graft dragnet at all levels of government, military and ruling Communist Party, after Zhang Zulin, Wang Xiliang, and Liu Jiachen. On September 4, he was stripped of his posts within the CCP and in the public office.

Government offices
Preceded by Zhang Zulin	Mayor of Kunming; 2012–2015	Succeeded by Wang Xiliang
Party political offices
Preceded by Suo Fei	Communist Party Secretary of Qujing; 2015–2021	Succeeded by Wang Xiliang
