= Xing Yun (politician) =

Chinese politician (born 1952)

- 邢云

Vice-Chairman of the Inner Mongolia People's Congress
- In office February 2012 – January 2016
- Chairman: Wang Jun

Secretary of Inner Mongolia Autonomous Region Political and Legal Affairs Commission
- In office December 2006 – November 2011
- Preceded by: Hu Zhong
- Succeeded by: Li Jia

Communist Party Secretary of Baotou
- In office December 2001 – December 2006
- Preceded by: Hu Zhong
- Succeeded by: Mo Jiancheng

Communist Party Secretary of Ordos City
- In office September 2001 – December 2001
- Preceded by: New position
- Succeeded by: Guo Ziming

Personal details
- Born: March 1952 (age 74) Tumed Left Banner, Hohhot, Inner Mongolia, China
- Party: Chinese Communist Party (1981–2019; expelled)
- Relations: Xing Yanju (sister)
- Education: Inner Mongolia University of Technology; Central Party School of the Chinese Communist Party

Chinese name
- Traditional Chinese: 邢雲
- Simplified Chinese: 邢云
Transcriptions
Standard Mandarin
- Hanyu Pinyin: Xíng Yún

Xing Yun (Chinese: 邢云; born March 1952) is a former Chinese politician who spent his entire career in the Inner Mongolia Autonomous Region. A career politician in China's Communist Party-run bureaucracy, Xing rose through the ranks gradually, capping his career as the top security official of Inner Mongolia. He was put under investigation for graft in October 2018, two years after he retired. At the time, he was serving as vice-chairman of the Inner Mongolia People's Congress. He was accused of taking over 400 million yuan in bribes, and sentenced to life in prison without the possibility of commutation or parole. He had the dubious distinction of having the highest recorded corrupt earnings in the history of Communist-ruled China.

== Biography ==
Xing was born in March 1952 in Tumed Left Banner, Inner Mongolia, China. He entered the workforce in September 1968, and joined the Chinese Communist Party in March 1981. During the Cultural Revolution, he taught at a school before going to Inner Mongolia University of Technology in September 1973. In December 1976 he was assigned to the Publicity Department of local government is Tumd Right Banner. In September 1987, he was appointed deputy head Shiguai District, Baotou. In December 1990, he was head and deputy Party chief of Shiguai District. He served as mayor of Ih Ju League (now Ordos City) from January 1995 to October 1996, and Communist Party Secretary, the top political position in the city, from October 1996 to December 2001. In December 2001 he was transferred back to Baotou and appointed Communist Party Secretary. In December 2006 he was promoted to become Secretary of Inner Mongolia Autonomous Region Political and Legal Affairs Commission, a position he held until November 2011. In February 2012 he became vice-chairman of the Inner Mongolia People's Congress, a position he held for almost four years until his retirement.

=== Downfall ===
On October 25, 2018, he was placed under investigation for serious violations of laws and regulations by the Central Commission for Discipline Inspection (CCDI), the party's internal disciplinary body, and the National Supervisory Commission, the highest anti-corruption agency of China. He was expelled from the Party on April 29, 2019. On August 15, 2019, the Dalian Intermediate People's Court opened in public to hear the case of Xing Yun. He had accepted properties and gifts either directly or through close relatives equivalent to 449 million yuan ($64 million). The amount set a record for the monetary value of suspected bribes or other ill-gotten gains during the anti-corruption campaign under Xi Jinping. On December 3, 2019, Xing was sentenced by the Dalian Intermediate People's Court to death with a two-year reprieve without commutation or parole when the sentence was automatically reduced to life imprisonment.

Xing's younger sister, Xing Yanju (邢燕菊), vice chairwoman of the Standing Committee of Hohhot People's Congress, was arrested on April 29, 2019, and was expelled from the Chinese Communist Party on May 10, 2019.

Party political offices
New title	Communist Party Secretary of Ordos City; 2001-2001	Succeeded by Guo Ziming (郭子明)
Preceded by Hu Zhong (胡忠)	Communist Party Secretary of Baotou; 2001-2006	Succeeded by Mo Jiancheng
Preceded by Hu Zhong (胡忠)	Secretary of Inner Mongolia Autonomous Region Political and Legal Affairs Commission; 2006-2011	Succeeded by Li Jia
