= Liu Hui (disambiguation) =

Liu Hui, may refer to:

- Liu Hui (fl. 3rd century CE), a Chinese mathematician who published a commentary in 263 CE on The Nine Chapters on the Mathematical Art.
- Liu Hui (politician, born 1959), a Chinese politician who served as chairman of Ningxia from 2013 to 2016.
- Liu Hui (politician, born 1966), a Chinese politician who served as the executive vice governor of Anhui from 2021 to 2023, now the secretary of the Commission for Discipline Inspection in Heilongjiang.
