= Shi Wenqing =

Chinese politician

- 史文清

Vice Chairman of the Standing Committee of Jiangxi Provincial People's Congress
- In office January 2015 – January 2018
- Chairman: Su Rong; Qiang Wei; Lu Xinshe

Communist Party Secretary of Ganzhou
- In office October 2010 – July 2015
- Deputy: Wang Ping; Leng Xinsheng (mayor)
- Preceded by: Pan Yiyang
- Succeeded by: Li Bingjun

Vice Governor of Jiangxi
- In office January 2008 – May 2011
- Governor: Wu Xinxiong

Personal details
- Born: October 1954 (age 71–72) Faku County, Liaoning, China
- Party: Chinese Communist Party (1974–2021; expelled)
- Education: Xi'an Jiaotong University

Shi Wenqing (Chinese: 史文清; pinyin: Shǐ Wénqīng; born October 1954) is a former Chinese politician of Mongolian ethnicity who spent most of his career in both Heilongjiang and Jiangxi provinces. As of September 2020 he was under investigation by China's top anti-corruption agency, two years after retirement. He was vice chairman of the Standing Committee of Jiangxi Provincial People's Congress from 2015 to 2018, party secretary of Ganzhou from 2010 to 2015, and before that, vice governor of Jiangxi, from 2008 to 2011. Shi is the second vice-provincial level official in Jiangxi to be targeted by China's top anticorruption watchdog since the 19th National Congress of the Chinese Communist Party, after Li Yihuang.

== Career ==
Shi was born in Faku County, Liaoning, in October 1954. During the Cultural Revolution, he was a worker in Horqin Left Middle Banner of eastern Inner Mongolia. He joined the Chinese Communist Party (CCP) in November 1974, and got involved in politics in July 1975, when he was appointed deputy party secretary of Wulanhua People's Commune (乌兰花人民公社). Then he assumed various posts in Jirem League (now Tongliao).

In May 1994, he was transferred to the capital Beijing, and worked as a secretary of the General Office of the Standing Committee of the National People's Congress, and one year later was elevated to deputy director of its Research Office.

In May 1998, he was assigned as deputy party secretary to Harbin, capital of northeast China's Heilongjiang province. In January 2007, he took office as assistant governor of Heilongjiang.

In December 2007, he was despatched to east China's Jiangxi province, where he rose to become vice governor in January 2008, and concurrently serving as party secretary of Ganzhou since October 2010. In February 2015, he was made vice chairman of the Standing Committee of Jiangxi Provincial People's Congress, serving in the post until his retirement in January 2018.

=== Downfall ===
On 18 December 2019, an article named "The Methods of Collecting Money and Faces of a Deputy-Provincial Senior Official" (一位副省级高官的敛金术和多面孔) was circulated on the internet, which reported Shi's corruption and bribery. And he responded that all news are slanders and rumors and I'm now making (writing) an explanation to the organization (所有的都是诽谤造谣，我现在正在给组织作(写)一个说明。).

On 21 September 2020, he was placed under investigation for alleged "serious violations of discipline and laws" by the Central Commission for Discipline Inspection (CCDI), the party's internal disciplinary body, and the National Supervisory Commission, the highest anti-corruption agency of China. His predecessor Pan Yiyang was sacked for graft in September 2014. Both his deputies Wang Ping and Leng Xinsheng had been placed under investigation in November 2014 and February 2017, respectively. His colleague Gong Jianhua, also vice chairman of the Standing Committee of Jiangxi Provincial People's Congress, surrendered himself to anti-corruption authorities in November 2021. On October 19, his qualification for delegates to the 13th National People's Congress was terminated.

On 28 March 2021, he was expelled from the Communist Party. He was detained by the Supreme People's Procuratorate in April. On May 13, he was indicted on suspicion of accepting bribes and illegally possessing firearms.

On 16 August 2022, he was sentenced to death with a two-year reprieve for taking bribes worth more than 195 million yuan (about 30.83 million U.S. dollars) and illegally possessing a firearm. He was deprived of his political rights for life, and all his personal assets were confiscated.

== Personal life ==
Shi has a son named Shi Jiachang (史家昌; born 1981).

During Shi's tenure in Harbin, his niece (daughter of Shi's brother), a 16-year-old girl, who worked in his house was raped by him many times. In addition, he raped his brother's other daughter. He developed his wife's two nieces Yang Yuhua (杨玉华) and Yang Yurong (杨玉荣) into full-time mistresses and sought benefits for their companies by his power. He also had many part-time mistresses and kept several stewardess as mistresses and has several illegitimate children.

Party political offices
Preceded by Pan Yiyang	Communist Party Secretary of Ganzhou; 2010–2015	Succeeded by Li Bingjun
