= Wenqing =

Wenqing is a Chinese given name. People with this name include:

- Li Wenqing (1930–2009), Chinese general
- Shi Wenqing (born 1954), Chinese politician
- Chen Wenqing (born 1960), Chinese intelligence officer and politician
- Yuan Wenqing (born 1966), Chinese wushu taolu athlete
- Jin Wenqing, fictional character from the Chinese novel A Flower in a Sinful Sea (Zeng Pu's version)

== Other uses ==
- Wenqing (文青), an abbreviation of wenyi qingnian (文藝青年), a Chinese term akin to hipster
