= Xiao Yi =

Xiao Yi (Wade–Giles: Hsiao I) or Xiaoyi may refer to:

- YI Technology, also known as Xiao Yi

== People ==
- Xiao Yi of Shang (fl. 12th century BC), a king of the Shang dynasty
- Xiao Yi (508–555), personal name of Emperor Yuan of Liang
- Shiao Yi (1935–2018) or Xiao Yi, Chinese wuxia novelist
- Xiao Yi (born 1962), Chinese politician, former vice chairman of the Jiangxi Provincial Committee of the Chinese People's Political Consultative Conference

== Places in China ==
- Xiaoyi, city in Shanxi
- Xiaoyi, Guangxi (校椅), town in Heng County, Guangxi
- Xiaoyi, Shaanxi (孝义), town in Weinan, Shaanxi
- Xiaoyi, Wenshui County (孝义), town in Wenshui County, Shanxi
- Xiaoyi Township (小伊乡), township in Guanyun County, Jiangsu
- Xiaoyi Subdistrict (孝义街道), subdistrict in Gongyi, Henan
