= Wu Cunrong =

Chinese politician (born 1963)

- 吴存荣

Chairman of the Shanxi Provincial Committee of the Chinese People's Political Consultative Conference
- In office January 2023 – December 2024
- Preceded by: Li Jia
- Succeeded by: Zhang Chunlin

Personal details
- Born: May 1963 (age 63) Wuwei County, Anhui, China
- Party: Chinese Communist Party (1984–2025; expelled)
- Education: Hohai University; China Europe International Business School

Chinese name
- Simplified Chinese: 吴存荣
- Traditional Chinese: 吳存榮
Transcriptions
Standard Mandarin
- Hanyu Pinyin: Wú Cúnróng

Wu Cunrong (Chinese: 吴存荣; born May 1963) is a former Chinese politician. He was investigated by China's top anti-graft agency in December 2024. Previously he served as chairman of the Shanxi Provincial Committee of the Chinese People's Political Consultative Conference.

Wu was a representative of the 18th and 19th National Congress of the Chinese Communist Party. He was an alternate of the 19th Central Committee of the Chinese Communist Party. He was a delegate to the 10th, 11th and 13th National People's Congress. He was a member of the 14th National Committee of the Chinese People's Political Consultative Conference.

== Early life and education ==
Wu was born in Wuwei County, Anhui, in May 1963. In 1981, he entered East China University of Water Resources (now Hohai University), where he majored in irrigation and drainage engineering. He joined the Chinese Communist Party (CCP) in September 1984, during his junior year.

== Career ==
After University in 1985, Wu became an assistant engineer at Anhui Provincial Water Resources and Hydropower Survey and Design Institute.

In November 1991, Wu was appointed chief of Engineering and Comprehensive Department of Anhui Provincial Leading Group Office for Huai River Regulation, and was elevated to deputy director in May 1993.

Wu was director of the Planning Department of Anhui Provincial Water Resources Department in December 1995 and subsequently deputy party secretary and magistrate of Zongyang County in February 1997. Ten months later, he rose to party secretary, the top political position in the county. In February 1999, he was transferred back to the Anhui Provincial Water Resources Department and appointed deputy head, and then head, in July 2001.

Wu served as mayor of Hefei from February 2006 to September 2011, and party secretary, the top political position in the city, from September 2011 to November 2016.

In October 2011, Wu was admitted to standing committee member of the CCP Anhui Provincial Committee, the province's top authority, and appointed vice governor, in November 2016.

Wu was made vice mayor of Chongqing in March 2017 and was admitted to standing committee member of the CCP Chongqing Municipal Committee, the city's top authority. He also served as president of Chongqing University of Administration and secretary of the Party Working Committee of Liangjiang New Area. He was deputy party secretary and president of the CCP Chongqing Municipal Party School in January 2021, in addition to serving as vice chairperson of Chongqing Municipal People's Congress, the city's top legislative body.

In January 2023, Wu was chosen as chairman of the Shanxi Provincial Committee of the Chinese People's Political Consultative Conference, the provincial advisory body.

== Downfall ==
On 16 December 2024, Wu was put under investigation for alleged "serious violations of discipline and laws" by the Central Commission for Discipline Inspection (CCDI), the party's internal disciplinary body, and the National Supervisory Commission, the highest anti-corruption agency of China.

On 5 June 2025, Wu was expelled from the CCP and removed from public office.

On 20 March 2026, Wu was sentenced to life imprisonment for taking bribes in 127 million yuan.

Government offices
Preceded by Cai Qihua	Head of the Anhui Provincial Water Resources Department; 2001–2005	Succeeded by Ji Bing
Preceded by Guo Wanqing	Mayor of Hefei; 2005–2011	Succeeded by Zhang Qingjun
Preceded by Chen Shulong	Executive Vice Governor of Anhui; 2016–2017	Succeeded by Deng Xiangyang
Preceded by Wang Jieming	Executive Vice Mayor of Chongqing; 2017–2021	Succeeded by Wang Fu
Party political offices
Preceded by Sun Jinlong	Communist Party Secretary of Hefei; 2011–2016	Succeeded by Song Guoquan
Preceded by Chen Lüping	Secretary of the Party Working Committee of Liangjiang New Area; 2018	Succeeded by Duan Chenggang
Preceded by Ren Xuefeng	Specifically-designated Deputy Communist Party Secretary of Chongqing; 2021–2022	Succeeded by Li Mingqing
Assembly seats
Preceded by Li Jia	Chairman of the Shanxi Provincial Committee of the Chinese People's Political Consultative Conference; 2023–2024	Succeeded by Zhang Chunlin
