= Liu Jifu =

Chinese politician (born 1949)

- 刘积福

Director of Jiangxi Provincial Land and Resources Department
- In office March 2006 – January 2010

Chairman of Jiujiang People's Congress
- In office December 2001 – June 2005
- Preceded by: Liu Shangyang
- Succeeded by: Zhao Zhiyong

Communist Party Secretary of Jiujiang
- In office December 2001 – June 2005
- Preceded by: Liu Shangyang
- Succeeded by: Zhao Zhiyong

Mayor of Jiujiang
- In office February 1998 – December 2001
- Preceded by: Qi Shanhong
- Succeeded by: Wang Zhongwu

Personal details
- Born: July 1949 (age 77) Ji'an County, Jiangxi, Republic of China
- Party: Chinese Communist Party
- Education: Central Party School of the Chinese Communist Party

Military service
- Allegiance: People's Republic of China
- Branch/service: People's Liberation Army Ground Force
- Years of service: 1968–1978

Chinese name
- Simplified Chinese: 刘积福
- Traditional Chinese: 劉積福
Transcriptions
Standard Mandarin
- Hanyu Pinyin: Liú Jīfú

Liu Jifu (born July 1949) is a Chinese retired politician, who spent his entire career in his home-province Jiangxi. He was investigated by China's top anti-corruption agency in October 2021, the 11th year of his retirement. Previously he served as director of Jiangxi Provincial Land and Resources Department, and before that, as party secretary, the top political position in three cities, Jiujiang, Ji'an, and Jiujiang. He was a delegate to the 11th National People's Congress.

== Biography ==
Liu was born in Ji'an County, Jiangxi, in July 1949. In February 1968, he enlisted in the People's Liberation Army, serving until September 1978. He joined the Chinese Communist Party in December 1969.

Beginning in September 1978, he served in several posts in Ji'an Intermediate People's Court, including deputy director of office and deputy president. He served as deputy party secretary and mayor of Jinggangshan, a county-level city under the jurisdiction of Ji'an, in September 1987, and two years later promoted to the party secretary position. It would be his first job as "first-in-charge" of a city. He was promoted to party secretary of Ji'an in August 1991 and was admitted to member of the standing committee of the CPC Ji'an Municipal Committee, the city's top authority.

In May 1995, he was transferred to the neighboring Yichun city and appointed deputy secretary.

In February 1998, he became deputy party secretary and mayor of Jiujiang, rising to party secretary in December 2001, and concurrently serving as chairman of Jiujiang People's Congress.

In June 2005, he was appointed party branch secretary of Jiangxi Provincial Land and Resources Department, concurrently holding the director position since March 2006. He retired in January 2010.

=== Downfall ===
On 13 October 2021, he was put under investigation for alleged "serious violations of discipline and laws" by the Central Commission for Discipline Inspection (CCDI), the party's internal disciplinary body, and the National Supervisory Commission, the highest anti-corruption agency of China. His successor Zhao Zhiyong was dismissed in June 2014 and demoted seven administrative levels from sub-provincial level down to Keyuan (section member). Chen Anzhong, a following party secretary of Jiujiang, was dismissed, arrested and investigated in December 2008 and sentenced 12 years in prison in June 2015.

Party political offices
Preceded by Qi Shanhong (戚善宏)	Mayor of Jiujiang; 1998–2001	Succeeded by Wang Zhongwu (王忠武)
Government offices
Preceded by Liu Shangyang	Communist Party Secretary of Jiujiang; 2001–2005	Succeeded by Zhao Zhiyong
Assembly seats
Preceded by Liu Shangyang	Chairman of Jiujiang People's Congress; 2001–2005	Succeeded by Zhao Zhiyong
