= Zhao Zhiyong =

Chinese politician, banker, and regional official

- 赵智勇

Secretary-General of CCP Jiangxi Provincial Committee
- In office June 2008 – June 2014
- Party Secretary: Su Rong
- Preceded by: Chen Daheng
- Succeeded by: Gong Jianhua

Vice Governor of Jiangxi
- In office March 2002 – June 2008
- Governor: Huang Zhiquan; Wu Xinxiong

Communist Party Secretary of Jiujiang
- In office June 2005 – November 2006
- Preceded by: Liu Jifu
- Succeeded by: Chen Anzhong

Personal details
- Born: April 1955 (age 71) Yi County, Hebei
- Party: Chinese Communist Party (1973–2014; expelled)
- Education: Southwestern University of Finance and Economics

Chinese name
- Simplified Chinese: 赵智勇
- Traditional Chinese: 趙智勇
Transcriptions
Standard Mandarin
- Hanyu Pinyin: Zhào Zhìyǒng

Zhao Zhiyong (born April 1955) is a former Chinese politician, banker, and regional official. He served as the Vice Governor of Jiangxi province between March 2002 to June 2008, and Communist Party Secretary of Jiujiang, from June 2005 to November 2006. He also served as Secretary-General of Jiangxi Provincial Party Committee (江西省委秘书长) from 2008 until June 2014, when he was dismissed for corruption.

Zhao was said to have "seriously violated party discipline," expelled from the Communist Party in July 2014, and demoted from a sub-provincial-level position directly to the lowest administrative level of the civil service of keyuan (科员). Zhao's demotion was notable for its severity.

== Career ==
Zhao was born and raised in Yi County, Hebei, he earned his Ph.D. degree from Southwestern University of Finance and Economics.

He got involved in politics in February 1970 and joined the Chinese Communist Party in October 1973.

Beginning in 1992, he served in several posts in the Jiangxi provincial branch of the Industrial and Commercial Bank of China (ICBC), China's largest bank, including director and managing director (行长).

In August 2000, he was transferred to Nanchang, Jiangxi. In March 2002, he was appointed as Vice Governor of Jiangxi province, and re-elected in December 2006. He also served as the CPC Party Chief of Jiujiang between June 2005 to November 2006. In June 2008, he became the Secretariat-General of Jiangxi Provincial Party Committee, he was re-elected on June 1, 2014.

On June 3, 2014, Zhao was dismissed from his posts for "serious violations of laws and regulations". On July 16, 2014, Zhao was expelled from the Chinese Communist Party, and demoted seven administrative levels from sub-provincial level down to keyuan, roughly equivalent in ranking to an intern or an entry-level position, the very lowest administrative level in the civil service. In November 2023, Zhao was placed under investigation by the Central Commission for Discipline Inspection again, and taken away by the Jiangxi Provincial Commission.

Party political offices
Preceded by Liu Jifu	Communist Party Secretary of Jiujiang; 2005–2006	Succeeded by Chen Anzhong
Preceded by Chen Daheng	Secretary-General of CCP Jiangxi Provincial Committee; 2008–2014	Succeeded by Gong Jianhua
