= Zhong Mian =

Zhong Mian (Chinese: 钟勉; pinyin: Zhōng Miǎn; born May 1963) is a Chinese politician from Sichuan province who served as the executive vice governor of the province between 2013 and 2015; since May 2015, he has served as the Chinese Communist Party Deputy Committee Secretary of Yunnan province.

Zhong was born in Qianwei County in Sichuan province. He studied political economics at Sichuan Finance College (now part of Southwestern University of Finance and Economics) and graduated in 1984. He joined the Chinese Communist Party (CCP) while attending university. He then worked in the provincial policy research office, then the provincial finance and economics office. He then was made a political secretary working in the provincial Party Committee General Office. In 1995, he was named CCP Committee Secretary of the city of Emeishan, and a CCP Standing Committee member of Leshan. In August 1997 he was elevated to deputy party chief of Leshan, then executive deputy mayor in 2000. In May 2000, he was named head of the Tourism Department of Sichuan, during this time he earned a doctorate degree in economics.

In February 2003, he was named CCP Committee Secretary of Ziyang, then in February 2007, the Secretary-General of the Party Committee, and a member of the provincial Party Standing Committee. In January 2008 he was made vice governor of Sichuan, then in February 2013, he was named executive vice governor. In April 2015, he was named CCP Deputy Committee Secretary of Yunnan, replacing the disgraced Qiu He. In 2016, Zhong was transferred to Guizhou to become vice-governor, in what was seen as a demotion.

Zhong was a delegate to the 17th and 18th National Congress of the Chinese Communist Party.

Party political offices
Previous: Qiu He	Deputy Communist Party Secretary of Yunnan; 2015–2016	Next: Li Xiuling
Government offices
Previous: Wei Hong	Executive Vice Governor of Sichuan; 2013–2015	Next: Wang Ning
