= Deng Xiangyang =

Chinese politician (born 1961)

Deng Xiangyang (born June 1961, Chinese: 邓向阳), a native of Rongcheng, Shandong, and is a Chinese politician.

== Biography ==
Deng Xiangyang obtained his degree from the History Department of Shandong Normal University in 1982. He became a member of the Chinese Communist Party in July 1985. In December 2002, he held the positions of deputy secretary and deputy mayor of the municipal party committee in Binzhou, Shandong Province; in December 2006, he assumed the role of acting mayor. In 2007, he was elected as the deputy secretary of CCP Binzhou Municipal Committee and mayor of Binzhou. In February 2008, he was designated as the secretary of the CCP Binzhou Municipal Committee. In January 2013, he was elected as the Vice Governor of the People's Government of Shandong Province.

In August 2014, Deng Xiangyang arrived in Anhui Province, assuming the role of a member of the Standing Committee of the CCP Anhui Provincial Committee and Minister of the Organization Department. In May 2017, he assumed the position of Vice Governor of the People's Government of Anhui Province. On February 24, 2018, he was elected as a delegate to the 13th National People's Congress. In January 2021, he was elected Vice Chairman of the CPPCC in Anhui Province. In October of that year, he was appointed deputy secretary of the party group of the Anhui CPPCC. In January 2023, he retired when the term expired.

Party political offices
Previous: Wang Jiong	Director of the Organization Department of the Anhui Provincial Committee of the Chinese Communist Party	Next: Yan Zhichan
Previous: Sun Dehan	Secretary of the CCP Binzhou Municipal Committee	Next: Zhang Guangfeng
Government offices
Previous: Wu Cunrong	Vice Governor of the People's Government of Anhui Province	Next: Liu Hui
Previous: An Shiyin	Mayor of the People's Government of Binzhou City	Next: Zhang Guangfeng
