= Chen Shulong =

Chinese politician (born 1962)

- 陈树隆

Executive Vice Governor of Anhui
- In office March 2016 – November 2016
- Preceded by: Zhan Xialai (詹夏来)
- Succeeded by: Wu Cunrong (吴存荣)

Personal details
- Born: November 1962 (age 63) Chaohu, Anhui
- Party: Chinese Communist Party
- Education: Anhui University of Finance and Economics; University of Science and Technology of China

Chinese name
- Traditional Chinese: 陳樹隆
- Simplified Chinese: 陈树隆
Transcriptions
Standard Mandarin
- Hanyu Pinyin: Chén Shùlóng

Chen Shulong (Chinese: 陈树隆; pinyin: Chén Shùlóng; born November 1962) is a former Chinese politician, and Executive Vice Governor of Anhui. He was dismissed from his position in November 2016 for investigation by the Central Commission for Discipline Inspection.

== Career ==
Chen Shulong was born in Chaohu, Anhui in November 1962, and he was entered to Anhui University of Finance and Economics in 1983 and graduated in 1987. Then he became the instructor in the school. From 1989 to 1993, he served in Finance Department of Anhui. In 1993, he served as deputy director of Treasury Service Center of Anhui, and upgraded to director and General Manager of Anhui Financial Securities Company in 1994. Chen became General Manager of Anhui Trust and Investment company in 1998 (the company is renamed as Guoyuan Holdings in 2001).

From 2002 to 2003, Chen served as Vice Mayor of Hefei. During office period, he also studied in University of Science and Technology of China. In 2003 he transferred to Wuhu, and served as Chinese Communist Party Deputy Committee Secretary and Vice Mayor. He upgraded to Mayor of Wuhu in 2006, and served as CCP Committee Secretary in 2008. In 2011, he elected as Member of CCP Provincial Standing Committee of Anhui. Chen was elected as Vice Governor of Anhui in 2012, and upgraded to Executive Vice Governor of Anhui in 2016. He was no longer served as Member of CCP Provincial Standing Committee of Anhui since October 2016.

== Investigation ==
On November 8, 2016, Chen Shulong was placed under investigation by the Central Commission for Discipline Inspection, the CCP's internal disciplinary body, for "serious violations of regulations". Chen was expelled from the CCP on May 2, 2017.

On July 27, 2018, Chen Shulong stood trial for bribery, power abuse, insider trading and disclosing inside information, at the Intermediate People's Court of Xiamen in southeast China's Fujian province. Chen took advantage of his different positions to benefit others in business operations, obtaining projects and bank loans, investments and personnel promotions, and in return accepting money and property worth over 275.8 million yuan (40.6 million U.S. dollars) personally or through his family members between 1994 and 2016. Besides, he also abused of power, illegally made 137 million yuan (20.4 million U.S. dollars) of gains from insider trading and disclosed inside information. Chen was sentenced to life in prison on April 3, 2019.

== See also ==
- Anti-corruption campaign under Xi Jinping
