= Huang Xiaowei (politician) =

Chinese politician

Huang Xiaowei (Chinese: 黄晓薇; born May 1961) is a Chinese politician currently serving as the party secretary of the All-China Women's Federation. Earlier in her career, she held positions in the Central Commission for Discipline Inspection and in Shanxi province.

== Biography ==
Born in Haicheng, Liaoning, Huang studied at the Northeast Polytechnic Institute (now Northeastern University). She began work in the city of Yingkou, in Liaoning province. In May 1998 she began work for the General Office of the Central Commission for Discipline Inspection. In 2003 she became head of shared services at the CCDI. In 2007, she was elevated to head the 7th Inspection Office. In October 2012, she became Vice Minister of Supervision. She was also elected to the 18th Central Commission for Discipline Inspection and its Standing Committee.

On September 30, 2014, after a wholesale reshuffle of the Shanxi provincial party leadership, Huang was named Secretary of Discipline Inspection of Shanxi Province, responsible for anti-corruption efforts. In 2018, Huang was named chairman of the provincial committee of the Chinese People's Political Consultative Conference of Shanxi province. She served in the role for eight months, before being transferred to Beijing to become party secretary, first secretary of the secretariat, and first-ranked vice-chair of the All-China Women's Federation.

Party political offices
Preceded by Lou Yangsheng	Deputy Party Secretary of Shanxi; 2016–2019	Succeeded by Lin Wu
Preceded by Xue Yanzhong	Chairman of the Shanxi CPPCC Committee; 2018	Succeeded by Li Jia
