= Gao Jinsong =

Chinese politician

- 高劲松

Communist Party Secretary of Kunming
- In office August 2014 – April 2015
- Preceded by: Zhang Tianxin
- Succeeded by: Cheng Lianyuan

Communist Party Secretary of Qujing
- In office December 2012 – August 2014
- Preceded by: Zhao Lixiong (赵立雄)
- Succeeded by: Suo Fei (锁飞)

Mayor of Yuxi
- In office March 2008 – December 2012
- Preceded by: Dong Shiqiang (董诗强)
- Succeeded by: Rao Nanhu (饶南湖)

Personal details
- Born: August 1963 (age 63) Luxi County, Yunnan, China
- Party: Chinese Communist Party (expelled)
- Education: Yunnan University

Gao Jinsong (simplified Chinese: 高劲松; traditional Chinese: 高勁松; pinyin: Gāo Jìnsōng; born August 1963) is a former Chinese politician who spent most of his career in Southwest China's Yunnan province. He was investigated by the Central Commission for Discipline Inspection in April 2015. Previously he served as the Chinese Communist Party Committee Secretary of Kunming.

Gao was a delegate to the 11th National People's Congress.

== Life and career ==
Gao was born and raised in Luxi County, Yunnan. He graduated from Yunnan University, majoring in foreign-related economic management.

In July 1996 - March 1998 he was deputy head of Wuhua District, a district under the jurisdiction of Kunming, and soon became its head. From January 2008 to December 2012 he served as deputy party secretary and mayor of Yuxi.

In December 2012, he was promoted to become party secretary of Qujing, he remained in that position until August 2014, when he was transferred to Kunming, capital of Yunan province, and appointed party secretary, the top political position in that city.

== Downfall ==
On April 10, 2015, the state media reported that he was placed under investigation. On the same day, he was dismissed for corruption. Zhao was the third consecutive Kunming party leader to be investigated for corruption or disciplinary offenses. His predecessors Zhang Tianxin and Qiu He were both investigated.

On August 3, 2016, he was expelled from the Chinese Communist Party. In October, his case was transferred to the procuratorate for further investigation and prosecution. On December 27, he stood trial for bribery at the Intermediate People's Court of Lincang.

On February 24, 2017, he was sentenced to 10 years and fined 1.3 million yuan.

Government offices
Preceded by Dong Shiqiang	Mayor of Yuxi; 2008–2012	Succeeded by Rao Nanhu
Party political offices
Preceded by Zhao Lixiong	Communist Party Secretary of Qujing; 2012–2014	Succeeded by Suo Fei
Preceded by Zhang Tianxin	Communist Party Secretary of Kunming; 2014–2015	Succeeded by Cheng Lianyuan
