= Chen Anzhong =

Chinese politician

- 陈安众

Vice-Chairman of Jiangxi Provincial People's Congress
- In office January 2010 – December 2013
- Chairman: Qiang Wei

Vice-Chairman of the Jiangxi Provincial Committee of the Chinese People's Political Consultative Conference
- In office January 2008 – January 2010
- Chairman: Fu Kecheng

Communist Party Secretary of Jiujiang
- In office November 2006 – January 2008
- Preceded by: Zhao Zhiyong
- Succeeded by: Zhong Ligui

Communist Party Secretary of Pingxiang
- In office June 2001 – November 2006
- Preceded by: Liu Nanfang
- Succeeded by: Xie Yisen

Mayor of Jingdezhen
- In office August 1999 – June 2001
- Preceded by: Liu Aicai
- Succeeded by: Xu Aimin

Mayor of Hengyang
- In office November 1996 – August 1999
- Preceded by: He Tongxin
- Succeeded by: Xu Minghua

Personal details
- Born: January 1954 (age 72) Ningyuan County, Hunan, China
- Party: Chinese Communist Party (1976–2014, expelled)
- Education: Hunan Normal University; Central Party School

Chinese name
- Traditional Chinese: 陳安眾
- Simplified Chinese: 陈安众
Transcriptions
Standard Mandarin
- Hanyu Pinyin: Chén Ānzhòng

Chen Anzhong (Chinese: 陈安众; born January 1954) is a former Chinese politician who served in a variety of positions in Jiangxi province. In 2015, he was sentenced to twelve years in prison for corruption.

== Biography ==
Chen was born in Ningyuan County, Hunan in January 1954. During the Down to the Countryside Movement, Chen worked as a sent-down youth at Junshan Farm, in Yueyang, Hunan. Chen began working in March 1972 and he joined the Chinese Communist Party in December 1976.

After the resumption of the University Entrance Examination in 1977, Chen entered Hunan Normal College in March 1978, majoring in political science, after graduating in January 1982 he was accepted to Central Party School of the Chinese Communist Party and graduated in December 1984, majoring in scientific socialism. After graduation, he taught there as an instructor.

From September 1985 to June 1993, Chen worked in Changsha as an officer.

In June 1993 he was promoted to become the deputy Party secretary of Hengyang, a position he held until August 1999. From November 1996 to August 1999, he was elected as the mayor of Hengyang; he ascended to a prefecture-level position at age 42.

Chen served as the deputy Party secretary of Jingdezhen and mayor of Jingdezhen between August 1999 to June 2001.

In June 2001, Chen was promoted to become the Party secretary of Pingxiang, he remained in that position until November 2006, when he was transferred to Jiujiang and appointed the Party secretary of Jiujiang.

In January 2008, Chen was elevated to the vice-chairman of the Jiangxi Provincial Committee of the Chinese People's Political Consultative Conference, a position he held until January 2010.

In January 2010, Chen was appointed as vice-chairman of Jiangxi Provincial People's Congress.

== Downfall ==
On December 8, 2013, Chen was dismissed, arrested and investigated for corruption by the Central Commission for Discipline Inspection. Chen was sentenced 12 years in prison on June 19, 2015, upon being convicted on charges of bribery; it was said he took 8.1 million yuan (~$1.27 million) in bribes.

Government offices
Preceded by He Tongxin (贺同新)	Mayor of Hengyang; 1996–1999	Succeeded by Xu Minghua (徐明华)
Preceded by Liu Aicai	Mayor of Jingdezhen; 1999–2001	Succeeded by Xu Aimin
Party political offices
Preceded by Liu Nanfang	Communist Party Secretary of Pingxiang; 2001–2006	Succeeded by Xie Yisen
Preceded by Zhao Zhiyong	Communist Party Secretary of Jiujiang; 2006–2008	Succeeded by Zhong Ligui
Civic offices
Preceded by Yao Yaping	Chairman of Jiangxi Federation of Trade Unions; 2012–2013	Succeeded by Xie Yisen
