= Li Jia (politician, born 1961) =

Chinese politician

- 李佳

Chairman of the Shanxi Provincial Committee of the Chinese People's Political Consultative Conference
- In office January 2019 – 2 August 2022
- Preceded by: Huang Xiaowei
- Succeeded by: Wu Cunrong

Chairman of the Inner Mongolia Regional Committee of the Chinese People's Political Consultative Conference
- In office January 2018 – January 2019
- Preceded by: Ren Yaping
- Succeeded by: Li Xiuling

Personal details
- Born: January 1961 (age 65) Dalian, Liaoning, China
- Party: Chinese Communist Party
- Education: Northeastern University

Li Jia (Chinese: 李佳; pinyin: Lǐ Jiā; born January 1961) is a Chinese politician who served as chairman of the Inner Mongolia Regional Committee of the Chinese People's Political Consultative Conference from 2018 to 2019 and chairman of the Shanxi Provincial Committee of the Chinese People's Political Consultative Conference from 2019 to 2022.

He was a representative of the 18th and 19th National Congress of the Chinese Communist Party. He was an alternate of the 18th and 19th Central Committee of the Chinese Communist Party. He was a member of the 13th National Committee of the Chinese People's Political Consultative Conference.

== Biography ==
Li was born in Dalian, Liaoning province. He joined the Communist Party in March 1985. He graduated from Northeastern University with a degree in science and technology philosophy and has a Ph.D. He is also a senior engineer. In the past he has served successively as the executive vice mayor of Shenyang, the deputy governor of Liaoning, and the head of the party's organization department in Inner Mongolia. From 2011 to 2018 he served as the deputy Communist Party Secretary of Inner Mongolia, and head of the regional Political and Legal Affairs Commission. He is an alternate the 18th Central Committee of the Chinese Communist Party.

=== Investigation ===
On 2 August 2022, Li was removed from public office. On August 24, he was removed from membership of China's top political advisory body, the Chinese People's Political Consultative Conference. On August 26, he was put under investigation for alleged "serious violations of discipline and laws" by the Central Commission for Discipline Inspection (CCDI), the party's internal disciplinary body, and the National Supervisory Commission, the highest anti-corruption agency of China. His qualification for representative of the 19th National Congress of the Chinese Communist Party was terminated, and demoted from provincial-ministerial level to deputy provincial-ministerial level, and will keep a position as 2nd-class investigator (二级巡视员). The money and property that Li had received in the form of bribes, as well as any interest arising from them, will be turned over to the national treasury.

Party political offices
Preceded by Chen Pengshan	Head of the Organization Department of the Inner Mongolia Autonomous Regional Committee of the Chinese Communist Party; 2008–2011	Succeeded by Li Pengxin
Preceded by Xing Yun	Secretary of the Political and Legal Committee of the Inner Mongolia Autonomous Regional Committee of the Chinese Communist Party; 2011–2016	Succeeded by Liu Hui
Preceded by Ren Yaping	Deputy Communist Party Secretary of Inner Mongolia; 2011–2018	Succeeded by Lin Shaochun
Preceded by Liu Hui	Secretary of the Political and Legal Committee of the Inner Mongolia Autonomous Regional Committee of the Chinese Communist Party; 2016–2018	Succeeded by Luo Yonggang
Assembly seats
Preceded by Ren Yaping	Chairman of the Inner Mongolia Regional Committee of the Chinese People's Political Consultative Conference; 2018–2019	Succeeded by Li Xiuling
Preceded by Huang Xiaowei	Chairman of the Shanxi Provincial Committee of the Chinese People's Political Consultative Conference; 2019–2022	Vacant Title next held by Wu Cunrong
