= Inner Mongolia University of Technology =

University in Hohhot, China

- 内蒙古工业大学 ᠥᠪᠥᠷ ᠮᠣᠩᠭᠣᠯ ‍ᠤᠨ ᠠᠵᠤ ᠦᠢᠯᠡᠳᠪᠦᠷᠢ ‍ᠶᠢᠨ ᠶᠡᠬᠡ ᠰᠤᠷᠭᠠᠭᠤᠯᠢ
- Motto: 博学躬行，尚志明德
- Type: Public university
- Established: 1951; 75 years ago
- Chancellor: Baoyinhexi
- President: Zhanfeng Li
- Rector: Baoyinhexi
- Principal: Zhanfeng Li
- Academic staff: 1,995
- Administrative staff: 1,408
- Students: 27,000
- Undergraduates: 22,510
- Postgraduates: 4,490
- Doctoral students: 201
- Location: Hohhot, Inner Mongolia, Hohhot city, Inner Mongolia, China, China
- Campus: 3700; Urban
- Nickname: 内工大 IMUT
- Website: www.imut.edu.cn
- Seal of Inner Mongolia University of Technology

Inner Mongolia University of Technology

Chinese name
- Simplified Chinese: 内蒙古工业大学
- Traditional Chinese: 內蒙古工业大學
Transcriptions
Standard Mandarin
- Hanyu Pinyin: Nèiměnggǔ Gōngyè Dàxué

Mongolian name
- Mongolian Cyrillic: ᠥᠪᠥᠷ ᠮᠣᠩᠭᠣᠯ ᠤᠨ ᠠᠵᠤ ᠦᠢᠯᠡᠳᠪᠦᠷᠢ ᠶᠢᠨ ᠶᠡᠬᠡ ᠰᠤᠷᠭᠠᠭᠤᠯᠢ

Inner Mongolia University of Technology (IMUT) (Chinese: 内蒙古工业大学) is a university in Inner Mongolia, People's Republic of China, under the authority of the Autonomous Region government. It was founded in 1951 and was originally known as the Suiyuan Higher Technical School (绥远省高级工业学校) and then after 1958 the Inner Mongolia Polytechnic Institute (内蒙古工学院) before changing to its current name in 1993. It has 3 campuses, two are located in Hohhot, the capital city of Inner Mongolia Autonomous Region, and one is located in Ordos City.

The university has over 27,000 students enrolled. The university is primarily an Engineering school, although it has expanded to other fields including Economics and Law. There are 6 disciplines in which students can acquire a Doctorate, 22 disciplines in which students can acquire a Master's Degree and 72 disciplines for undergraduate study.

Introduction to Degrees and Postgraduates of Inner Mongolia University of Technology

Founded in 1951, Inner Mongolia University of Technology is the earliest engineering university established in minority areas after the founding of P.R. China. It plays an important role in the national higher education system and has a special regional focus.

The degree and postgraduate education of Inner Mongolia University of Technology began in 1984. In 1986, it obtained the right to confer master's degrees and in 2003, it obtained the right to confer doctoral degrees. The postgraduate management organization originated from the Graduate Office of Inner Mongolia University of Technology, which was established in 1984, and the Graduate Department was established in 1988. The Graduate Office was established in March 2001, and the Graduate School was formally established in 2010.

The school currently has 6 first-level disciplines authorized by doctoral degrees (chemical engineering and technology, materials science and engineering, mechanics, power engineering and engineering thermophysics, architecture, and Politics), 25 first-level disciplines authorized by master's degrees, and 15 authorized professional master's degrees. In terms of categories, there are 2 first-class disciplines under the "Double First-Class" project in the autonomous region, 3 disciplines with advantages and characteristics in the autonomous region, 9 key disciplines in the autonomous region, and 4 key cultivation disciplines in the autonomous region. In the fourth round of national subject evaluation organized by the Academic Degrees and Graduate Education Development Center of the Ministry of Education in 2017, the evaluation results of "Chemical Engineering and Technology" of our school were B−, "Material Science and Engineering" and "Power Engineering and Engineering Thermophysics" The evaluation results are C, and the evaluation results of "mechanics", "civil engineering" and "architecture" are C−, and the discipline level and academic influence of our school are steadily improving.

After 70 years of development, Inner Mongolia University of Technology has smelted a team of postgraduate tutors with high moral character, rigorous scholarship and high level, and built a number of distinctive scientific research platforms. There are 80 doctoral supervisors and 639 master supervisors. The school currently has 1 provincial and ministerial key laboratory of the Ministry of Education, 1 national and local joint engineering research center approved by the National Development and Reform Commission, 41 autonomous region-level scientific research and innovation platforms, and 17 autonomous region-level innovation teams.

After 70 years of accumulation, our school's degree and postgraduate education capabilities have been significantly improved, and the quality of training has continued to improve. There are 4490 doctoral and master students in the school, 217 doctoral students and 7228 master students of various types have been trained in the past 10 years. The Graduate School is the functional department of our school's postgraduate education and teaching management, as well as the management and service organization of the school's discipline construction.

At present, the Graduate School has set up five departments, including the Admissions Office, the Training and Student Status Management Office, the Degree Office, the General Office, and the Degree Site Istablishment and Quality Assessment Office, which are respectively responsible for graduate admissions, training, degrees, discipline construction and quality management, and departmental work. In 2018, the school set up the Discipline Construction Office and the Faculty Office, which are affiliated with the Graduate School.
