= Li Changping =

Li Changping (Chinese: 李昌平; born 1963) and originally from Dongting Lake, was a rural cadre and is now a researcher in Beijing.

Li worked in Qipan, where he became secretary of his local commune in Hubei province in 1983. In 1999, he completed a master's degree in Economics and returned to Hubei as a party secretary. He gained fame after writing a letter to then Chinese Premier Zhu Rongji, expressing his concerns about the management of farm workers by local officials. Many workers were paying more tax than permitted to support the lifestyles of these officials. The letter was published in the newspaper Southern Weekend, and its readers voted Li as the 'Man of the Year'.

He provides a first-hand account of fighting against corruption in his book, "I Told the Premier the Truth." An interview with him is featured in the book "One China, Many Paths."

Li was described by The Guardian in 2002 as "China's most famous advocate for peasant rights".

== Publications ==
- Wo xiang zongli shuo shihua (I Told the Premier the Truth) (2002), Guangming Chubanshe
