= Liu Hui (politician, born 1966) =

Chinese politician

- 刘惠

Secretary of the Commission for Discipline Inspection the CCP Heilongjiang Provincial Committee
- Incumbent
- Assumed office January 2023
- Preceded by: Li Yugang

Executive Vice Governor of Anhui
- In office 29 September 2021 – January 2023
- Governor: Wang Qingxian
- Preceded by: Deng Xiangyang
- Succeeded by: Fei Gaoyun

Personal details
- Born: September 1966 (age 60) Li County, Hunan, China
- Party: Chinese Communist Party
- Education: Renmin University of China

Chinese name
- Simplified Chinese: 刘惠
- Traditional Chinese: 劉惠
Transcriptions
Standard Mandarin
- Hanyu Pinyin: Liú Huì

Liu Hui (Chinese: 刘惠; born September 1966) is a Chinese politician, currently serving as secretary of the Commission for Discipline Inspection the CCP Heilongjiang Provincial Committee. He was executive vice governor of Anhui from 2021 to 2023. He served as a representative at the 19th National Congress of the Chinese Communist Party.

== Early life and education ==
Liu was born in Li County, Hunan, in September 1966. In 1981, he enrolled at Renmin University of China where he received his bachelor's degree in statistics in 1985 and his master's degree in economics in 1990. He was a teacher at Beijing FRP Research and Design Institute between July 1985 and September 1987.

After university, he joined the Department of Supply and Marketing Cooperation Management, Ministry of Commerce (now All China Federation of Supply and Marketing Cooperatives), becoming director of Cooperation Guidance Department in November 2005 and director of International Cooperation Department in April 2010.

== Career in Inner Mongolia ==
In October 2010, he was transferred to Hohhot, capital of north China's Inner Mongolia, and appointed party secretary of Xincheng District and admitted to member of the standing committee of the Hohhot Municipal Party Committee, the city's top authority. In December 2013, he became deputy party secretary of Wuhai, concurrently serving as secretary of its Commission for Discipline Inspection, the party's agency in charge of anti-corruption efforts. When he returned to Hohhot in August 2014, he took up the post of director of Inner Mongolia Autonomous Region Party Committee Inspection Leading Group Office, and in January 2016 was promoted to member of the standing committee of the CCP Inner Mongolia Regional Committee, the region's top authority. He also served as secretary of Inner Mongolia Regional Politics and Law Commission from February 2016 to September 2016.

== Career in Anhui ==
In September 2016, he was transferred to central Anhui province, where he was appointed secretary of its Commission for Discipline Inspection, and became member of the standing committee of the CCP Anhui Provincial Committee. In January 2018, he concurrently served as chairman of the newly founded Anhui Provincial Supervisory Commission, the highest anti-corruption agency in the province. On 29 September 2021, he rose to become executive vice governor of Anhui, replacing Deng Xiangyang.

== Career in Heilongjiang ==
In December 2022, Liu was appointed secretary of the Commission for Discipline Inspection the CCP Heilongjiang Provincial Committee and was admitted to standing committee member of the CCP Heilongjiang Provincial Committee, the province's top authority.

Party political offices
Preceded by Li Jia	Secretary of Inner Mongolia Regional Politics and Law Commission; 2016–2016	Succeeded by Li Jia
Preceded by Wang Binyi	Secretary of the Commission for Discipline Inspection the CCP Anhui Provincial Committee; 2016–2021	Succeeded by Liu Haiquan
Preceded by Li Yugang	Secretary of the Commission for Discipline Inspection the CCP Heilongjiang Provincial Committee; 2022–present	Incumbent
Government offices
New title	Chairman of Anhui Provincial Supervisory Commission; 2018–2021	Succeeded by Liu Haiquan
Preceded by Deng Xiangyang	Executive Vice Governor of Anhui; 2021–2023	Succeeded by Fei Gaoyun
