= Wang Yongchun =

Chinese politician and business executive

Wang Yongchun 王永春
- Born: July 1960 (age 66); Qian'an County, Jilin
- Education: Jilin University
- Occupations: Vice-President of PetroChina (2011–2013); President of Daqing Oil Field (2009–2011)
- Political party: Chinese Communist Party (expelled in 2014)

Wang Yongchun (Chinese: 王永春; pinyin: Wāng Yǒngchūn; born July 1960) is a former Chinese business executive in the oil and gas industry. Wang was an Alternate Member of 18th Central Committee of the Chinese Communist Party.

At the pinnacle of his career he was the General Manager (chief executive) of Daqing Oil Field Co. Ltd., and subsequently served as a senior vice-president of PetroChina. He was detained as part of a wider crackdown on alleged corruption in the oil industry in China. He was expelled from the Communist Party in June 2014.

== Biography ==
Wang was born in Qian'an County, Jilin in July 1960.

Resumption of University Entrance Examination in 1977, Wang entered Jilin University, majoring in geology, where he graduated in August 1983.

Wang served as the President of Jilin Exploration and Development Research Institute of PetroChina between August 1983 to September 1999. He entered the PetroChina in October 2004.

In August 2009 he was promoted to become the President of Daqing Oil Field Limited-Liability Company, a position he held until April 2011.

In April 2011, he was appointed the vice-president of PetroChina, he remained in that position until August 2013.

=== Downfall ===
On August 26, 2013, Wang was being investigated by the Central Commission for Discipline Inspection for "serious violations of laws and regulations". Wang was expelled from the Communist Party on June 30, 2014.

On October 13, 2015, following a trial at the Xiangyang Intermediate People's Court in Hubei province, Wang Yongchun was convicted on charges of abuse of power, bribery, and "amassing wealth of unclear origin", and sentenced to 20 years in prison. He was said to have taken over 48.56 million yuan (~$7.64 million) in bribes over his time as an energy executive.
