= Cheng Lianyuan =

Chinese politician

Cheng Lianyuan (Chinese: 程连元; born December 1961) is a Chinese politician, and current Communist Party Secretary of Kunming, the capital of Yunnan province. Born in Beijing, Cheng graduated with a degree in engineering at the Beijing University of Technology. He began work as a mechanical factory worker, he then worked in a series of management roles at different companies in the capital. He entered the municipal government to head up the department of Industrial Advancement. Then he became district governor of Chaoyang District, Beijing, then in July 2012 he was named Chaoyang District party chief. In July 2015 he was named party chief of Kunming.

Party political offices
Previous: Gao Jinsong	Communist Party Secretary of Kunming; 2015–present	Incumbent
