= Yang Chongyong =

Chinese politician (born 1955)

Yang Chongyong 杨崇勇

Executive Vice-Chairman of the Hebei People's Congress
- In office January 2016 – April 2017
- Chairman: Zhao Kezhi
- Succeeded by: Fan Zhaobing （范照兵）

Vice Governor of Hebei
- In office January 2008 – January 2016

Communist Party Secretary of Kunming
- In office May 2003 – December 2007
- Preceded by: Yang Jianqiang (杨健强)
- Succeeded by: Qiu He

Personal details
- Born: November 1955 (age 70) Kunming, Yunnan
- Party: Chinese Communist Party (expelled)
- Education: Yunnan University
- Occupation: Politician

Yang Chongyong (Chinese: 杨崇勇; pinyin: Yáng Chóngyǒng; born November 1955) is a former Chinese politician who spent his career in Yunnan and Hebei. He most recently held the post of the vice-chairman of the Hebei People's Congress. Previously, he held the post of the Vice Governor of Hebei and Communist Party Secretary of Kunming. He was investigated by the Chinese Communist Party's anti-graft agency in April 2017. He was accused of taking 206 million RMB bribery according to The Second People's Court of Tianjin, 2018.

== Biography ==
Yang Chongyong was born in May 1955 in Kunming, Yunnan, a member of the minority Manchu ethnic group. He graduated from Yunnan University. In his early career, he held the post of the Communist Party Secretary of Yiliang County, Secretary General of Yunnan People's Government, the Communist Party Secretary of Yuxi etc. In 2003, he was appointed as the Communist Party Secretary of Kunming until 2007.

In 2008, Yang moved to Hebei, and he was elected as the Vice Governor of Hebei. He was elected as the vice-chairman of the Hebei People's Congress in 2016.

On 11 April 2017, Yang was being investigated by the Central Commission for Discipline Inspection of the Chinese Communist Party (CCDI) for "serious violations of regulations"; he was, remarkably, the fourth consecutively-serving Kunming party chief to be investigated for corruption. He was expelled from the Communist Party on 4 July 2017.

On 27 September 2018, Yang was sentenced to life in prison for taking bribes worth 206 million yuan by the Second Intermediate People's Court in Tianjin.
