= Mo Jiancheng =

Chinese politician (born 1956)

- 莫建成

Leader of the Discipline Inspection Team sent by Central Commission for Discipline Inspection to Ministry of Finance
- In office December 2015 – August 2017
- Preceded by: Liu Jianhua
- Succeeded by: Zhao Huiling

Deputy Communist Party Secretary of Jiangxi
- In office January 2015 – December 2015
- Preceded by: Shang Yong
- Succeeded by: Liu Qi

Executive Vice-Governor of Jiangxi
- In office July 2013 – August 2015
- Preceded by: Ling Chengxing
- Succeeded by: Mao Weiming

Communist Party Secretary of Baotou
- In office December 2006 – April 2010
- Preceded by: Xing Yun
- Succeeded by: Guo Qijun

Communist Party Secretary of Tongliao
- In office January 2003 – December 2004
- Preceded by: Zhao Shuanglian
- Succeeded by: Fu Taizeng

Mayor of Tongliao
- In office September 2001 – March 2003
- Preceded by: Zhao Shuanglian
- Succeeded by: Nashun Menghe

Personal details
- Born: March 1956 (age 70) Shengzhou, Zhejiang, China
- Party: Chinese Communist Party (1977–2017; expelled)
- Education: Central Party School of the Chinese Communist Party; Inner Mongolia Agricultural University

Mo Jiancheng (Chinese: 莫建成; pinyin: Mò Jiànchéng; born March 1956) is a former Chinese politician who spent most of his career in both Inner Mongolia and Jiangxi. As of August 2017 he was under investigation by the Communist Party's anti-corruption agency. Previously he served as leader of the discipline inspection team sent by Central Commission for Discipline Inspection (CCDI) to Ministry of Finance (MOF) from December 2015 to August 2017, Deputy Communist Party Secretary of Jiangxi from January 2015 to December 2015, executive vice-governor of Jiangxi from July 2013 to September 2015, Communist Party Secretary of Baotou from November 2006 to April 2010, and Communist Party Secretary of Tongliao from January 2003 to December 2004. Mo worked with Su Rong for a long time.

Mo was a delegate to the 17th National Congress of the Chinese Communist Party and an alternate of the 18th CCP Central Committee.

== Biography ==
Mo was born in March 1956 in Shengzhou, Zhejiang. He graduated from the Central Party School of the Chinese Communist Party and Inner Mongolia Agricultural University.

=== Inner Mongolia Autonomous Region ===
During the Down to the Countryside Movement, he was a sent-down youth in Wuhai, Inner Mongolia. He entered the workforce in February 1972, and joined the Chinese Communist Party in May 1977. In October 1993 he was promoted to become vice-mayor of Wuhai, a position he held until February 1998. From February 1998 to February 2000 he briefly served as deputy director of Inner Mongolia Autonomous Region Township Enterprise Bureau. He became the Mayor of Tongliao, a prefecture-level city under the jurisdiction of Inner Mongolia, in September 2001, and then Communist Party Secretary, the top political position in the city, beginning in January 2003. In December 2004, he was appointed director of CCP Inner Mongolia Autonomous Region Publicity Department, he remained in that position until November 2006, when he was transferred to Baotou and appointed Communist Party Secretary.

=== Jiangxi ===
In April 2010 he was transferred to Nanchang, capital of central China's Jiangxi province, and appointed director of CCP Jiangxi Provincial Organization Department. He rose to become executive vice-governor in July 2013, in January 2015 he was promoted again to become Deputy Communist Party Secretary. At the end of that same year, he was transferred to Beijing, capital of Chian, where he served as a member of the Chinese Communist Party (CCP) committee of the Ministry of Finance (MOF) and leader of the discipline inspection team sent by Central Commission for Discipline Inspection (CCDI) to Ministry of Finance (MOF).

=== Downfall ===
On August 27, 2017, Mo Jiancheng has been placed under investigation for serious violations of laws and regulations by the party's disciplinary body. In November he was removed from membership of the 12th National People's Congress. On September 23, he was expelled from the Chinese Communist Party and removed from public office.

On September 12, 2018, the First Intermediate People's Court of Beijing tried to hear his case, the statement said that "Mo, suspected of taking bribes, took advantage of his posts to seek profits for others and accepted a huge amount of property".

On January 23, 2019, Mo was sentenced on 14 years in prison and fined four million yuan for taking bribes worth 42.59 million yuan.

Government offices
Preceded by Zhao Shuanglian (赵双连)	Mayor of Tongliao; 2001–2003	Succeeded by Nashun Menghe (那顺孟和)
Preceded by Ling Chengxing (凌成兴)	Executive Vice-Governor of Jiangxi; 2013–2015	Succeeded by Mao Weiming (毛伟明)
Party political offices
Preceded by Zhao Shuanglian (赵双连)	Communist Party Secretary of Tongliao; 2003–2004	Succeeded by Fu Taizeng (符太增)
Preceded by Zhang Guomin (张国民)	Director of CCP Inner Mongolia Autonomous Region Publicity Department; 2004–2006	Succeeded by Ulan
Preceded by Xing Yun	Communist Party Secretary of Baotou; 2006–2010	Succeeded by Guo Qijun (郭启俊)
Preceded by Song Chenguang (宋晨光)	Director of CCP Jiangxi Provincial United Front Work Department; 2011–2011	Succeeded by Cai Xiaoming (蔡晓明)
Preceded by Hong Qiang (弘强)	Director of CCP Jiangxi Provincial Organization Department; 2010–2013	Succeeded by Zhao Aiming (赵爱明)
Preceded by Shang Yong (尚勇)	Deputy Communist Party Secretary of Jiangxi; 2015–2015	Succeeded by Liu Qi
Preceded by Liu Jianhua (刘建华)	Leader of the Discipline Inspection Team sent by Central Commission for Discipline Inspection to Ministry of Finance; 2015–2017	Succeeded by Zhao Huiling (赵惠令)
