= Standing Committee of the 18th Central Commission for Discipline Inspection =

The 18th Standing Committee of the Central Commission for Discipline Inspection (CCDI) was elected at the 1st Plenary Session of the 18th CCDI on 15 November 2012.

== Members ==
Name (birth–death)	Took office	Left office	Duration	Concurrent positions
Wang Wei (born 1960)	15 November 2012	21 May 2013	187 days	CCDI Deputy Secretary
Wang Qishan (born 1948)	15 November 2012	24 October 2017	4 years, 343 days	Politburo Standing Committee; CCDI Secretary
Liu Bin (born 1959)	15 November 2012	—	4 years, 343 days	Deputy Secretary of the Military CDI
Jiang Bixin (born 1956)	15 November 2012	—	4 years, 343 days	Vice President of the Supreme People's Court
Du Jincai (born 1952)	15 November 2012	—	4 years, 343 days	CCDI Deputy Secretary; Secretary of the Military CDI
Li Yufu (born 1954)	15 November 2012	25 October 2014	1 year, 344 days	CCDI Deputy Secretary
Wu Yuliang (born 1952)	15 November 2012	—	4 years, 343 days	CCDI Deputy Secretary
Qiu Xueqiang (born 1957)	15 November 2012	—	4 years, 343 days	Vice President of the Supreme People's Procuratorate
Zhang Jun (born 1956)	15 November 2012	—	4 years, 343 days	CCDI Deputy Secretary
Zhang Jinan (born 1957)	15 November 2012	—	4 years, 343 days	General Office chief of the Central Institutional Organization Commission
Chen Wenqing (born 1960)	15 November 2012	May 2015	2 years, 167 days	CCDI Deputy Secretary
Zhou Fuqi (born 1953)	15 November 2012	—	4 years, 343 days	Deputy Secretary of the Work Department for Organizations directly reporting to the Central Committee
Zhao Hongzhu (born 1947)	15 November 2012	—	4 years, 343 days	Secretary of the Secretariat; CCDI Deputy Secretary
Hou Kai (born 1962)	15 November 2012	—	4 years, 343 days	Secretary of the Shanghai CDI
Yu Guilin (born 1952)	15 November 2012	—	4 years, 343 days	Deputy Secretary of the Work Department for Organizations directly reporting to the State Council
Yao Zengke (born 1960)	15 November 2012	—	4 years, 343 days	Secretary of the Tianjin CDI
Huang Shuxian (born 1954)	15 November 2012	—	4 years, 343 days	Minister of Supervision
Huang Xiaowei (born 1961)	15 November 2012	—	4 years, 343 days	Secretary of the Shanxi CDI
Cui Shaopeng (born 1961)	15 November 2012	—	4 years, 343 days	Secretary-General of the CCDI; Secretary of the Jilin CDI
Yang Xiaodu (born 1953)	21 January 2013	—	4 years, 276 days	CCDI Deputy Secretary
Liu Jinguo (born 1955)	25 October 2014	—	2 years, 364 days	CCDI Deputy Secretary; Head of Discipline Inspection at the Ministry of Public Security
