= Anhui University of Finance and Economics =

University in Bengbu, Anhui, China

Coordinates: 32.9255°N 117.39°E

- 安徽财经大学
- Established: 1959; 67 years ago
- President: Ding Zhongming (丁忠明)
- Academic staff: 1,070
- Students: 28,143
- Location: Bengbu, Anhui, China
- Campus: Urban
- Website: www.aufe.edu.cn

Anhui University of Finance and Economics (AUFE) (simplified Chinese: 安徽财经大学; traditional Chinese: 安徽財經大學; pinyin: Ānhuī Cáijīng Dàxué), founded as Anhui Institute of Finance and Trade (安徽财贸学院) in 1959, is a university in Bengbu, Anhui Province, China.

== Campuses ==
AUFE has a total area of 701,000 square metres and comprises three campuses: Longhu Lake East, Longhu Lake West, and Jiaotong Road. The Longhu Lake East Campus and the Longhu Lake West Campus are on the two sides of the Longhu Lake, a national AAAA-class scenic district.

Its library holds 1.8 million volumes, 0.52 million electronic volumes, and 1,700 Chinese and foreign periodicals. The university facilities include laboratories, research centers, swimming pools, gymnasia, and playgrounds.

== Organization ==
AUFE consists of thirteen schools, two departments, three university-affiliated and ten school-affiliated research institutions. The university awards bachelor's degrees in 41 academic disciplines, master's degrees in two Level I academic disciplines and 28 Level II academic disciplines. In addition, three special programs are offered: MBA, JM, master's degrees for on-post college teachers. The university has four Key Research Bases at provincial or ministerial level, one A-class and four B-class key disciplines at provincial level, three state-level characteristic undergraduate majors, two provincial-level characteristic undergraduate majors, four provincial-level demonstration majors, two provincial-level demonstration centers for experimental teaching, and 28 provincial-level quality courses.

== College and schools ==
- School of Economics
- School of Finance
- School of International Economics and Trade
- School of Management
- School of Business
- School of Accountancy
- School of Finance and Public Administration
- Faculty of Law
- School of Information Engineering
- School of Statistics and Applied Mathematics
- School of Foreign Languages
- School of Literature, Art and Media
- School of Politics

== Research Centers and institutes ==
- Rural Economic and Social Development Research Institute
- Circulation of Economic Research Research Institute
- Government and Non-profit organization Accounting Institute
- International law International Tax Law Research Center
- Accounting Financial Development and Research Center
- Logistics and Supply Chain Management Research Center
- Enterprise Information Management Research Institute
- Applied Mathematics Research Institute
- Applied Statistics Research Institute
- History and Culture Research Institutions (HCRI)
- Research Center of Rural Public Policies (RCRPP)
- Research Center of Consumer's Behavior (RCCB)
- Research Center of SOE Management (RCSM)
- Research Center of Entrepreneurship and Business Growth (RCEBG)
- Research Institution of Trade and Industry Development (RITID)
- Research Institution of Modern Finance (RIMF)
- Research Institution of Company Economy
- Research institutions of economies at county level
- Cotton Project Research Institution
- Economic Research Center

== Faculty ==
There are over 1,070 professional teachers and 115 of them are full professors and 335 of them associate professors.
