= Xu Aimin =

Chinese politician

Vice-Chairman of Jiangxi Provincial People's Political Consultative Conference
- In office 2013–2014

Personal details
- Born: January 1957 (age 69) Lichuan County, Jiangxi
- Party: Chinese Communist Party (expelled)
- Education: Jingdezhen Ceramic Institute

Xu Aimin (simplified Chinese: 许爱民; traditional Chinese: 許愛民; pinyin: Xǔ Àimín; born January 1957) is a former Chinese politician who served as vice-chairman of Jiangxi Provincial People's Political Consultative Conference since 2013. In 2014, Xu was placed under investigation by the Central Commission for Discipline Inspection.

== Career ==
Xu Aimin was born in Lichuan County, Jiangxi in January 1957. He graduated from Jingdezhen Ceramic Institute. Xu became the Mayor of Linchuan in 1988 and Deputy Mayor of Jingdezhen in 1997. He took the Mayor of Jingdezhen position in 2001. In 2011, Xu became the director of Jiangxi Development and Reform Commission. In 2013, Xu served as vice-chairman of Jiangxi Provincial People's Political Consultative Conference.

In 2014, Xu was placed under investigation by the Central Commission for Discipline Inspection. On February 17, 2015, Xu was expelled from the Chinese Communist Party and demoted to deputy division-level.
