= Wuhan Institute of Technology =

Provincial public university in Wuhan, Hubei, China

Coordinates: 30°30′03″N 114°23′13″E

- 武汉工程大学
- Motto: 团结 严谨 勤奋 求实 (in Chinese)
- Motto in English: Unity, Rigour, Diligence and Seeking truth
- Type: National university
- Established: June 18, 1972
- President: Wang CunWen (王存文)
- Academic staff: 2,000
- Students: 21,000
- Location: Wuhan, Hubei, China
- Campus: Urban, 1,600 mu (亩) (1.07 sq km)
- Website: wit.edu.cn wit.edu.cn/english

The Wuhan Institute of Technology (WIT; Chinese: 武汉工程大学; pinyin: Wǔhàn Gōngchéng Dàxué; lit. 'Wuhan Engineering University') is a provincial public university in Wuhan, Hubei, China. It is affiliated with the Province of Hubei, and sponsored by the provincial government.

The school was founded in 1972 as Hubei Chemical Engineering and Petroleum College (湖北化工石油学院). The college changed its name to Wuhan Chemical Engineering College (武汉化工学院) in 1980 and to the current name in 2006.

== Organization and administration ==
WIT has 15 schools:

- School of Chemical Engineering and Pharmacy
- School of Mechanical & Electrical Engineering
- School of Material Science and engineering
- School of Environment and Civil Engineering
- School of Electrical and Electronic Engineering
- School of Economic management
- School of Law & Business
- School of computer science and engineering
- School of Science
- School of Foreign Languages
- School of Arts
- School of Adult Education
- International School
- Department of P.E.
- School of Telecommunication & Information Engineering
