= Xiao Yi (politician, born 1962) =

Chinese politician

- 肖毅

Vice Chairman of the Jiangxi Provincial Committee of the Chinese People's Political Consultative Conference
- In office January 2018 – May 2021
- Chairman: Yao Zengke

Communist Party Secretary of Fuzhou
- In office April 2015 – March 2021
- Preceded by: Gong Jianhua
- Succeeded by: Zhang Hongxing

Director of the Beijing Office of Jiangxi Provincial Government
- In office July 2007 – April 2015
- Succeeded by: Jiang Zhiying

Communist Party Secretary of Ruijin
- In office January 2001 – November 2006

Mayor of Ruijin
- In office June 1996 – January 2001

Personal details
- Born: May 1962 (age 64) Ganzhou, Jiangxi, China
- Party: Chinese Communist Party (1984–2021; expelled)
- Education: Gannan Normal University; Central Party School of the Chinese Communist Party

Xiao Yi (Chinese: 肖毅; pinyin: Xiāo Yì; born May 1962) is a former Chinese politician who spent his entire career in his home-province Jiangxi. He was investigated by China's top anti-graft agency in May 2021. Previously he served as vice chairman of the Jiangxi Provincial Committee of the Chinese People's Political Consultative Conference. He entered the workforce in September 1981, and joined the Chinese Communist Party in August 1984. He was a delegate to the 19th National Congress of the Chinese Communist Party. He was a delegate to the 11th National People's Congress.

== Career ==
Xiao was born in Ganzhou, Jiangxi, in May 1962. After the resumption of college entrance examination in 1978, he entered Gannan Normal College (now Gannan Normal University), where he majored in Chinese. After graduating in 1981, he became a teacher.

After a short period of teaching middle school students at Chongyi Middle School, he entered politics in Chongyi County. In October 1992 he was promoted to become deputy magistrate of Shanghang County. In March 1995 he was promoted again to become deputy party chief. He was deputy party chief of Longnan County in January 1996, but having held the position for only five months. In 1996, after Ruijin was upgraded to a county-level city, he became the first mayor, concurrently holding the deputy party chief position. In January 2001, he was elevated to party chief, the top political position in the city. He concurrently served as vice mayor of Ganzhou since June 2003. He served as deputy director of the Beijing Office of Jiangxi Provincial Government in November 2006, and one year later promoted to the director position. In April 2015, he was transferred to Fuzhou and appointed party chief. In January 2018, he rose to become vice chairman of the Jiangxi Provincial Committee of the Chinese People's Political Consultative Conference.

== Downfall ==
On May 10, 2021, he was put under investigation for alleged "serious violations of discipline and laws" by the Central Commission for Discipline Inspection (CCDI), the party's internal disciplinary body, and the National Supervisory Commission, the highest anti-corruption agency of China. The investigation arose from Xiao's endorsement of an energy consuming crypto mining operation and an internal combustion car plant, both of which ran counter to the new concept for development's goals of a greener economy.

On November 12, he was expelled from the Communist Party and dismissed from public office.

On 29 December 2022, he stood trial for bribery and abusing his powers at the Hangzhou Intermediate People's Court in east China's Zhejiang province. The public prosecutors accused him of abusing his multiple positions between 2008 and 2021 in Jiangxi to seek favor on behalf of certain organizations and individuals in engineering contracting, project development, and job promotions. In return, he accepted money and property worth more than 125 million yuan ($17.98 million).

On August 22, 2023, he was sentenced to life imprisonment for bribery by the Hangzhou Intermediate People's Court. He was also deprived of his political rights for life, and had his personal properties confiscated.

The CCDI featured his case in a 2023 documentary as a prominent example of corruption.

Party political offices
Preceded by Gong Jianhua	Communist Party Secretary of Fuzhou; 2015–2021	Succeeded by Zhang Hongxing
