= Zhang Tianxin =

Chinese politician

Zhang Tianxin 张田欣

Communist Party Secretary of Kunming
- In office December 2011 – July 2014
- Preceded by: Qiu He
- Succeeded by: Gao Jinsong

Director of the CPC Yunnan Propaganda Department
- In office November 2006 – November 2011
- Preceded by: Yan Youqiong (晏友琼)
- Succeeded by: Zhao Jin (赵金)

Communist Party Secretary of the Wenshan Zhuang and Miao Autonomous Prefecture
- In office October 1999 – November 2006
- Succeeded by: Li Pei (李培)

CPC Party Chief of Yuxi
- In office June 1998 – October 1999

Personal details
- Born: July 1955 (age 71) Jiangchuan County, Yunnan
- Party: Chinese Communist Party (expelled)
- Education: Kunming University of Science and Technology; Yunnan Normal University
- Occupation: Politician

Zhang Tianxin (Chinese: 张田欣; pinyin: Zhāng Tiánxīn; born July 1955) is a former Chinese politician, and Communist Party Secretary of Kunming, the provincial capital of Yunnan Province, between 2011 and 2014. He was dismissed from his position in July 2014, after he came under investigation for violating "party discipline", and subsequently expelled from the Chinese Communist Party.

== Early life and education ==
Zhang was born and raised in Jiangchuan County, Yunnan. Zhang began teaching middle school in his home county at age 19, during the latter years of the Cultural Revolution. After three years on the job, Zhang took part in the Gaokao exams and received a placement at Kunming Teacher's College (now Yunnan Normal University).

== Career ==
Zhang got involved in politics in May 1978, first taking a job as an ordinary office worker at the Prefecture government of Yuxi, where he began rising through the ranks. He joined the Chinese Communist Party in June 1984. In 1989, Zhang was named the deputy party chief of Yimen County.

In June 1998, Zhang was appointed the deputy party chief of Yuxi, he remained in that position until October 1999, when he was transferred to Wenshan Zhuang and Miao Autonomous Prefecture as the Party Secretary, occupying a regional top office for the first time. In November 2006, Zhang was promoted to become the head of the provincial Propaganda Department. In December 2011, Zhang was named the Communist Party Secretary of Kunming, capital of Yunnan province.

In Kunming, Zhang was largely known for his extensive street renovation projects, which he said was part of a strategy to make Kunming more attractive to tourists. One of his 'pet projects' was the city's Beijing Road renovation project.

In 2013, rumours began circulating in the city's political circles about Zhang possibly facing an investigation. In July 2014, Zhang was removed from office for "serious disciplinary violations". On July 16, 2014, Zhang was expelled from the Chinese Communist Party after the party investigation concluded that Zhang had "wasted government funds" and that he had "abused his power for personal gain." He was demoted to the sub-division level non-leading civil service position (fuchuji). The investigation did not conclude that his actions broke the law, merely that they were "severe violations of party discipline", therefore he was not further prosecuted.

Zhang's former superior, former Yunnan provincial party chief Bai Enpei, was also placed under investigation in 2014.
