= Liu Jiachen =

Chinese politician (born 1972)

- 刘佳晨

Mayor of Kunming
- In office January 2021 – January 2025
- Preceded by: Wang Xiliang
- Succeeded by: Yang Chengxin

Personal details
- Born: March 4, 1972 (age 54) Fengnan, Hebei, China
- Party: Chinese Communist Party
- Education: Tsinghua University; Rutgers University

Liu Jiachen (Chinese: 刘佳晨; born 4 March 1972) is a Chinese politician, who served as the mayor of Kunming, Yunnan from 2021 to 2025. He was a delegate to the 14th National People's Congress.

== Career ==
Liu was born in Fengnan, Hebei. He was earned the bachelor of engineering of Tsinghua University in 1995, later he was earned the Master of Science in 1997.

In 1999, Liu was enrolled to Honeywell, which served as a software engineer. He also studied at Rutgers University, which earned the doctor of engineering in 2002.

In 2002, Liaoning Province was recruiting leading cadres from overseas, Liu was achieved the 1st place. He was returned to China and served as the deputy director and general engineer of Dalian Information Industry Bureau. In 2005, Liu was appointed as the secretary of the Communist Youth League Dalian Committee. In 2007, he was appointed as the district chief of Zhongshan District in Dalian.

In 2009, Liu was appointed as the deputy head of the United Front Work Department of the Central Committee of the Communist Youth League, and the deputy secretary-general of the All-China Youth Federation. In 2010, he was appointed as the head.

In 2016, Liu was transferred to Yunnan, and appointed as the deputy party secretary of Lijiang. He was also served as the head of the United Front Work Department concurrently. In January 2018, Liu was appointed as the director of Yunnan Provincial Department of Land and Resources, which is renamed as Yunnan Provincial Department of Natural Resources in October after government reform.

In December 2020, Liu was appointed as the deputy party secretary of Kunming. He was appointed as the acting mayor in January 2021, and elected formally in February.

Liu had participated many marathon competitions since 2021. On 31 December 2023, he was finished Kunming marathon at 3:47:48. He also participated 2024 competition, and finished at 3:37:31, which breaks his personal record. Liu was nicknamed "the fastest-running mayor" by running enthusiasts.

== Investigation ==
On 21 January 2025, Liu was put under investigation for alleged "serious violations of discipline and laws" by the Yunnan Commission for Discipline Inspection, and the Yunnan Supervisory Commission. He was removed from the delegate to the 14th National People's Congress post on 27 June.

Government offices
Preceded by Wang Xiliang	Mayor of Kunming; 2021–2025	Succeeded by Yang Chengxin
