= Pan Yiyang =

Chinese politician (born 1961)

- 潘逸阳

Executive Vice Chairman of Inner Mongolia
- In office October 2010 – September 2014
- Preceded by: Ren Yaping (任亚平)
- Succeeded by: Fu Taizeng (符太增)

Communist Party Chief of Ganzhou
- In office September 2003 – October 2010
- Preceded by: Zhang Hairu (张海如)
- Succeeded by: Shi Wenqing (史文清)

Communist Party Chief of Xinyu
- In office December 1998 – December 2001
- Preceded by: Ding Yaoming (丁耀民)
- Succeeded by: Hong Lihe (洪礼和)

Personal details
- Born: August 1961 (age 65) Huiyang District, Huizhou, Guangdong, China
- Party: Chinese Communist Party (1984–2015; expelled)
- Education: Sun Yat-sen University

Chinese name
- Traditional Chinese: 潘逸陽
- Simplified Chinese: 潘逸阳
Transcriptions
Standard Mandarin
- Hanyu Pinyin: Pān Yìyáng
Hakka
- Romanization: Pan^{1} Yid^{6}-yong^{2}
Yue: Cantonese
- Jyutping: Pun^{1} Jat^{6}-joeng^{4}

Pan Yiyang (Chinese: 潘逸阳; born August 1961) is a former Chinese politician who served in regional posts in Jiangxi province and Inner Mongolia. Pan served as the Communist Party Secretary of Ganzhou between 2003 and 2010, and subsequently Executive Vice Chairman of Inner Mongolia. During his tenure in the autonomous region he also sat on the Party Standing Committee of Inner Mongolia. He was placed under investigation for corruption in September 2014 and expelled from the Communist Party. Upon being convicted on charges of bribery, Pan was sentenced to 20 years in prison.

== Biography ==
Pan was born and raised in Huiyang District of Huizhou, Guangdong, where he earned a Ph.D. degree from Sun Yat-sen University.

He became involved in politics in January 1982 and joined the Chinese Communist Party in August 1984. Beginning in 1983, he served in several posts in Foshan, including Deputy Party Secretary, and Party Secretary.

In March 1998, he was appointed the CPC Party Chief of Conghua, he remained in that position until December 1998, when he was transferred to Xinyu and appointed the CPC Party Chief.

From December 2001 to September 2003, he served as the head of the Agriculture Department of Jiangxi Province.

He became the CPC Party Chief of Ganzhou in September 2003, and served until October 2010.

He was promoted to become the Executive Vice-chairman of the government of Inner Mongolia Autonomous Region in October 2010.

== Downfall ==
On September 17, 2014, the state media reported that he would be investigated by the Central Commission for Discipline Inspection for "serious disciplinary violations".

The party investigation concluded that Pan engaged in "non-organizational political activities", did not observe "political discipline and political rules", gave gifts to seek specific offices, sought to advance the interests of associates through accepting cash and gifts. "Pan Yiyang was an alternate member of the Central Committee; his ideals and beliefs evaporated, severely violated party discipline, did not tone down his behavior even after the 18th Party Congress." He was expelled from the Communist Party on October 16, 2015, and his case moved to judicial authorities for processing.

Pan was a member of the 11th National People's Congress, and an alternate member of the 18th Central Committee of the Chinese Communist Party. Chinese media reported that he had close relations with former Jiangxi Party Secretary Su Rong. Pan and Su worked together during their respective tenures in high-ranking posts in Jiangxi province.

On April 18, 2017, Pan was sentenced on 20 years in prison for taking bribes worth 86.01 million yuan (~$12.50 million) and giving bribes equivalent to 7.61 million yuan (~$1.11 million) to former party General Office chief Ling Jihua by the First Intermediate People's Court in Tianjin.

Party political offices
Preceded by Lin Musheng	Secretary of Guangdong Provincial Committee of the Communist Youth League of China; 1995–1998	Succeeded by Xu Pinghua
Preceded by Ding Yaoming	Communist Party Chief of Xinyu; 1998–2001	Succeeded by Hong Lihe
Preceded by ?	Head of Rural Work Department of Jiangxi Provincial Committee of the Chinese Communist Party; 2001–2003	Succeeded by Lü Bin
Preceded by Zhang Hairu	Communist Party Chief of Ganzhou; 2003–2010	Succeeded by Shi Wenqing
Government offices
Preceded by Ren Yaping	Executive Vice Chairman of Inner Mongolia; 2010–2014	Succeeded by Fu Taizeng
