= Li Yihuang =

Chinese politician and entrepreneur

- 李贻煌

Vice Governor of Jiangxi
- In office January 2013 – January 2018
- Governor: Lu Xinshe→Liu Qi

Personal details
- Born: October 1962 (age 63–64) Jinjiang, Fujian
- Party: Chinese Communist Party (expelled; 1987-2018)
- Education: Central South University

Li Yihuang (simplified Chinese: 李贻煌; traditional Chinese: 李貽煌; pinyin: Lǐ Yíhuāng; born October 1962) is a former Chinese politician and entrepreneur. He was the Vice Governor of Jiangxi and the President of Jiangxi Copper. On January 17, 2018, Li Yihuang was placed under investigation by the Central Commission for Discipline Inspection.

== Career ==
Li Yihuang was born in Jinjiang, Fujian in October 1962. He graduated from Central South University, and started to work at Guixi Smelter of Jiangxi Copper since 1982.

In 2001, Li was appointed as the Vice Manager of Jiangxi Copper, later he promoted to the Manager and President.

In 2013, Li was appointed as the Vice Governor of Jiangxi.

== Investigation ==
On January 17, 2018, Li Yihuang was placed under investigation by the Central Commission for Discipline Inspection, the Chinese Communist Party's internal disciplinary body, for "serious violations of regulations".

On April 26, 2018, Li Yihuang was stripped of his post and party membership.

On November 23, 2018, Li Yihuang stood trial for bribery, embezzlement, misappropriation of public funds and abuse of power at the Intermediate People's Court of Anqing in Anhui. Li took advantage of his different positions to benefit others in business cooperation, stock right transfers, project contracting and job adjustments. He was charged with accepting money and property worth more than 51.19 million yuan (about 7.4 million U.S. dollars) personally or through others between 2004 and 2017. Besides, he was also charged with plundering the public fund worth 2.68 million yuan, redirecting public fund worth 147 million yuan and abusing of power, stood trial at the Intermediate People's Court of Anqing in Anhui Province on November 23, 2018.

== Sentence ==
On January 29, 2019, Li was sentenced to 18 years in prison and fined 2.2 million yuan ($327,600) for taking bribes, corruption and embezzlement of public funds.

Business positions
| New title | Chairman of Jiangxi Copper; 2009-2011 | Succeeded by Li Baomin |
