= Qiu He =

Chinese politician

- 仇和

Deputy Communist Party Secretary of Yunnan
- In office November 2011 – March 2015
- Secretary: Qin Guangrong; Li Jiheng
- Preceded by: Li Jiheng
- Succeeded by: Zhong Mian

Communist Party Secretary of Kunming
- In office December 2007 – November 2011
- Preceded by: Yang Chongyong
- Succeeded by: Zhang Tianxin

Vice-Governor of Jiangsu
- In office January 2006 – December 2007
- Preceded by: Wu Ruilin (吴瑞林)
- Succeeded by: Xu Ming (徐鸣)

Communist Party Secretary of Suqian
- In office August 2001 – April 2006
- Preceded by: Xu Shousheng
- Succeeded by: Zhang Xinshi (张新实)

Mayor of Suqian
- In office January 2001 – August 2001
- Preceded by: She Yihe (佘义和)
- Succeeded by: Zhang Xinshi

Personal details
- Born: January 1957 (age 69) Binhai County, Jiangsu, China
- Party: Chinese Communist Party (1977–2015, expelled)
- Education: Nanjing Agricultural University; Tsinghua University; John F. Kennedy School of Government

Qiu He (Chinese: 仇和; pinyin: Qiú Hé; born January 1957) is a former Chinese politician who spent his career in Jiangsu and Yunnan provinces. He most recently held the post of the Deputy Communist Party Secretary of Yunnan. He was investigated by the Chinese Communist Party's anti-graft agency in March 2015.

Qiu He was a member of the 12th National People's Congress and an alternate member of the 18th Central Committee of the Chinese Communist Party.

== Life and career ==
Qiu He was born and raised in Binhai County, Jiangsu. He entered Nanjing Agricultural College (now Nanjing Agricultural University) in March 1978, majoring in botanical and plant conservation, where he graduated in January 1982. Qiu then joined the Jiangsu Agricultural Science Institute. In 1985 he became an office liaison for a 'party clean-up' project in the city of Huaiyin. The following year he was named deputy director of the Botanical Conservation Institute of Jiangsu (江苏省农科院植保研究所). In 1988 he became governor of Feng County. He also studied at Tsinghua University. From 1990 to 1996, he worked at Jiangsu Provincial Association of Science and Technology.

Between April 1995 and January 1996 he was sent to the John F. Kennedy School of Government at Harvard University as a part-time student. In 1996 he began working in the city of Suqian as a member of its planning commission, by September he was named vice-mayor. He then became party head of Shuyang County, where he experimented with a far-reaching anti-corruption campaign, and first explored the possibility of hiring staff to direct public opinion in favour of the government on the internet (a precursor to the fifty cent party).

In 1998, Qiu instituted a program for local teachers to take part in activities courting private investment in the city of Suqian. This unusual program was covered in the Focus Report program on the flagship channel of China Central Television. In 1999, Qiu spearheaded another program publicly 'naming and shaming' those caught with petty crimes on local television, earning a special feature report on the liberal Southern Weekend newspaper. In 2000, he became mayor, and in August 2001 became Communist Party Secretary, the top political position of the city. In 2001 he began an ambitious program to privatize education in the city.

In January 2006 he was promoted to become Vice-Governor of Jiangsu, one year later, he was transferred to Kunming, capital of Yunnan province, and served as the Communist Party Secretary. In November 2011 he was promoted again to become Deputy Communist Party Secretary of Yunnan, he remained in that position until March 2015, when he was being investigated by the Central Commission for Discipline Inspection for "serious violations of laws and regulations". Qiu's former boss, Bai Enpei, was also investigated for corruption. His successor as party chief of Kunming, Zhang Tianxin, was also investigated and demoted for violating discipline. It is unclear if the two cases are related.

On July 31, Qiu was expelled from the Chinese Communist Party at the conclusion of the investigation into him by the Central Commission for Discipline Inspection. The anti-graft agency accused Qiu of "accepting cash gifts, using the convenience of his office to aid in the business operations of his relatives and aid in the promotion of officials... accepted massive bribes." He was also indicted on criminal charges of bribery.

On December 15, 2016, Qiu was sentenced for 14 years and 6 months in prison for bribery. Qiu's superior, Qin Guangrong, former party chief of Yunnan, handed himself in to the government in May 2019.

Qiu is an alternate member of the 18th Central Committee of the Chinese Communist Party. He was elected at the 18th Party Congress held in November 2012 but barely met the threshold of support for election. Of the elected members, he placed second last in the vote count, ahead only of Li Xiaopeng, the son of former Premier Li Peng.

Government offices
Preceded by She Yihe	Mayor of Suqian; 2001–2001	Succeeded by Zhang Xinshi
Preceded by Wu Ruilin	Vice-Governor of Jiangsu; 2006–2007	Succeeded by Xu Ming
Party political offices
Preceded by Xu Shousheng	Communist Party Secretary of Suqian; 2001–2006	Succeeded by Zhang Xinshi
Preceded by Yang Chongyong	Communist Party Secretary of Kunming; 2007–2011	Succeeded by Zhang Tianxin
Preceded by Li Jiheng	Deputy Communist Party Secretary of Yunnan; 2011–2015	Succeeded by Zhong Mian
