= Shenzhen =

City in Guangdong, China

Shenzhen 深圳市
- Prefecture-level and sub-provincial city
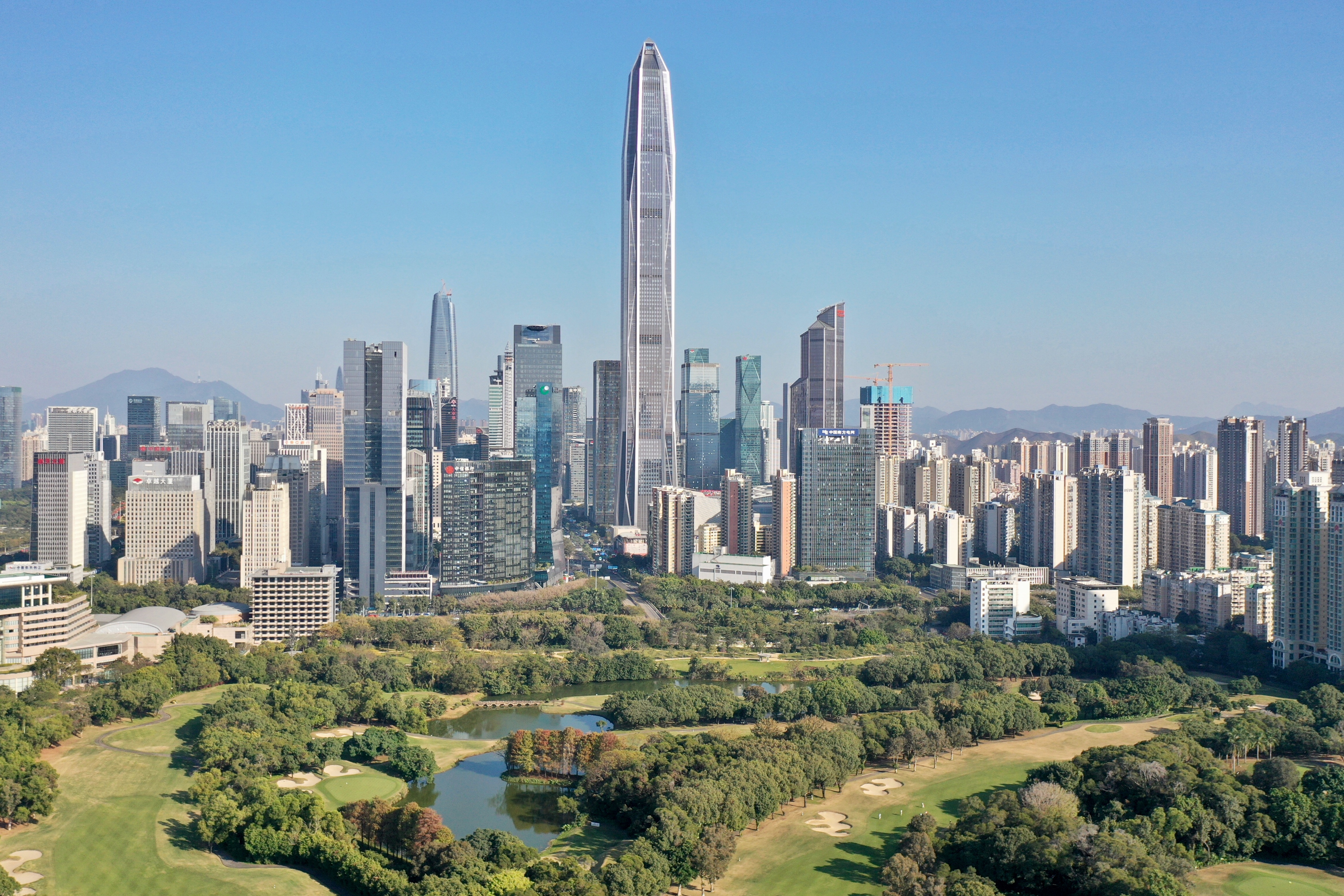
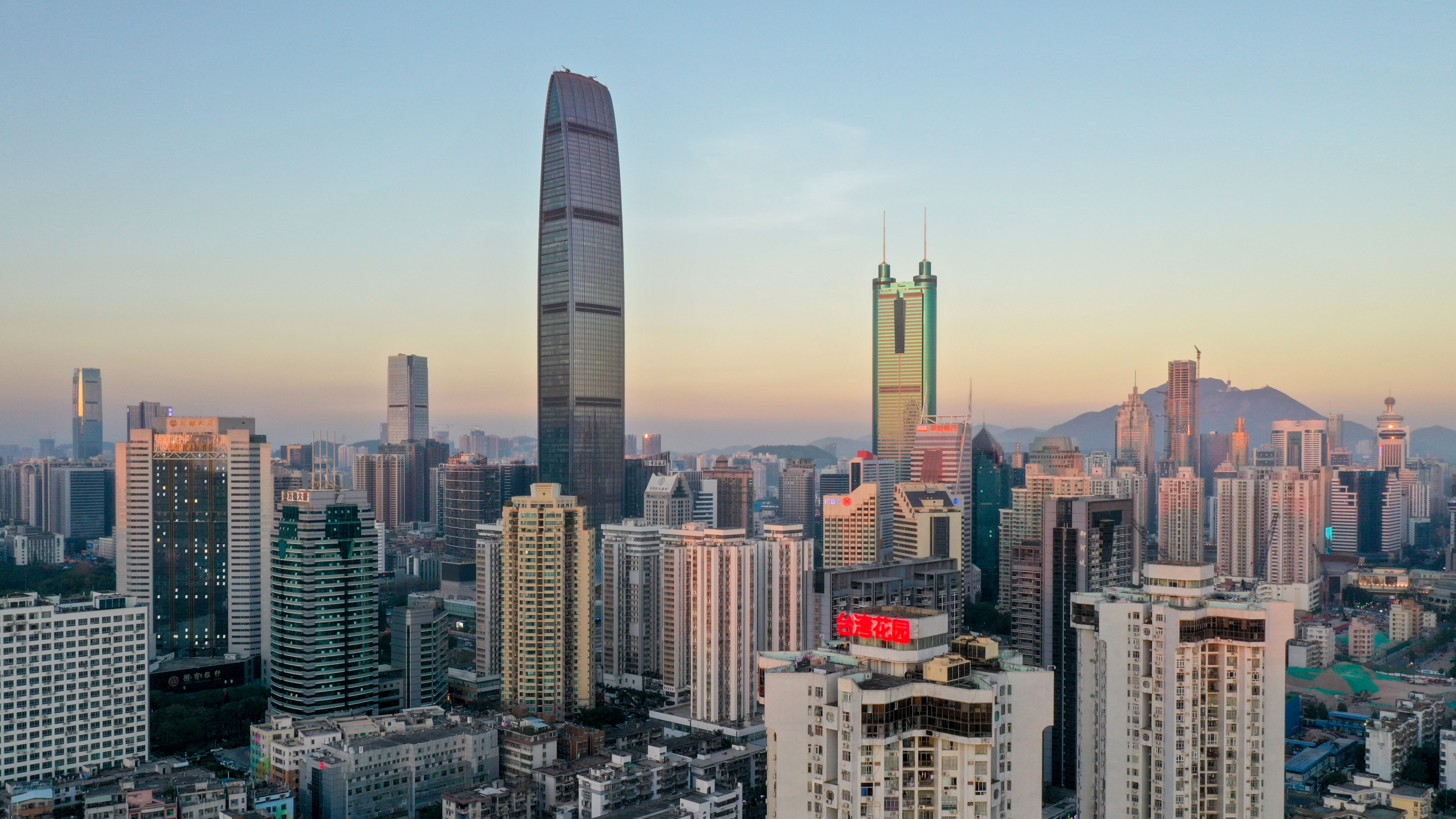
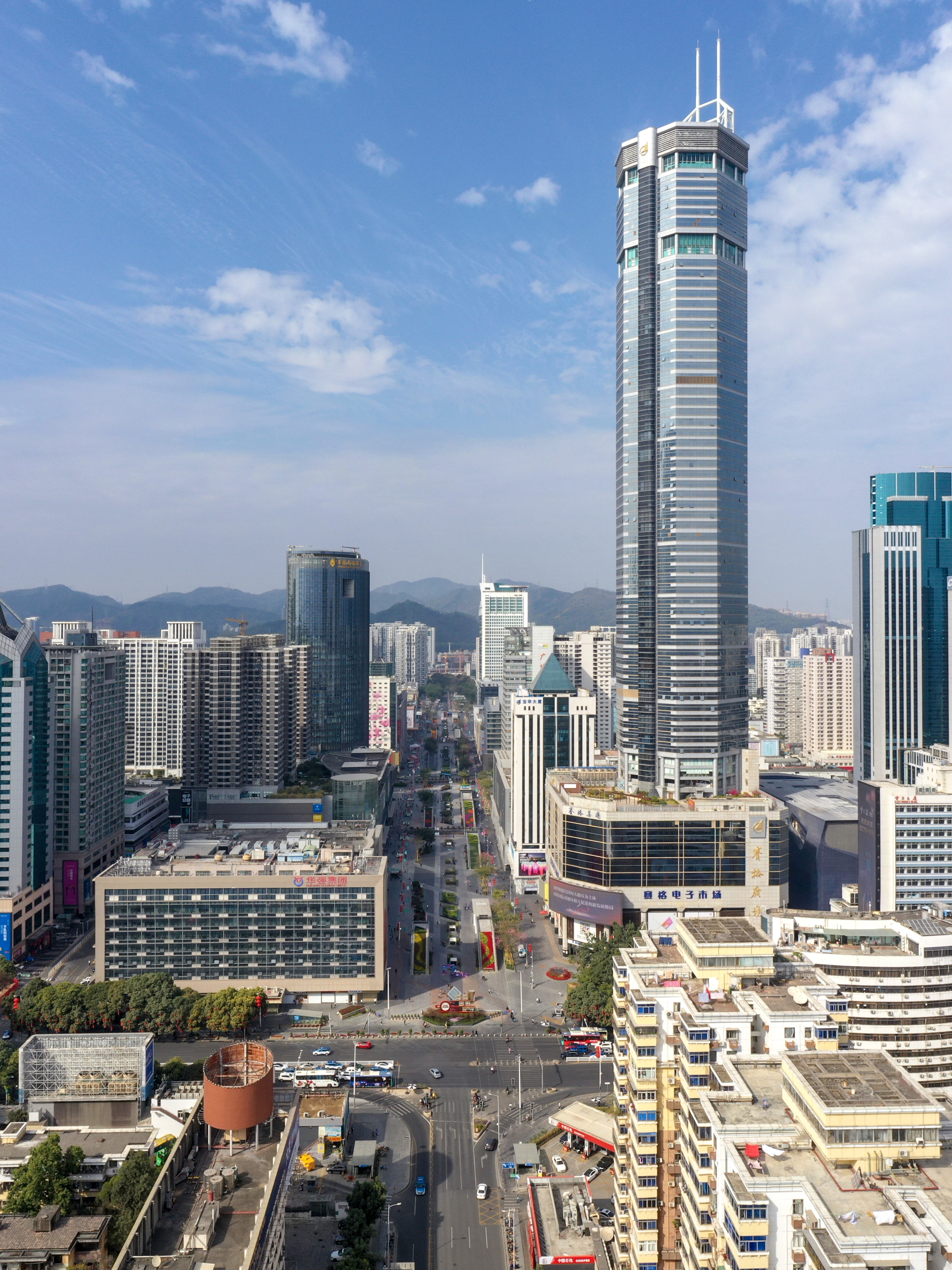
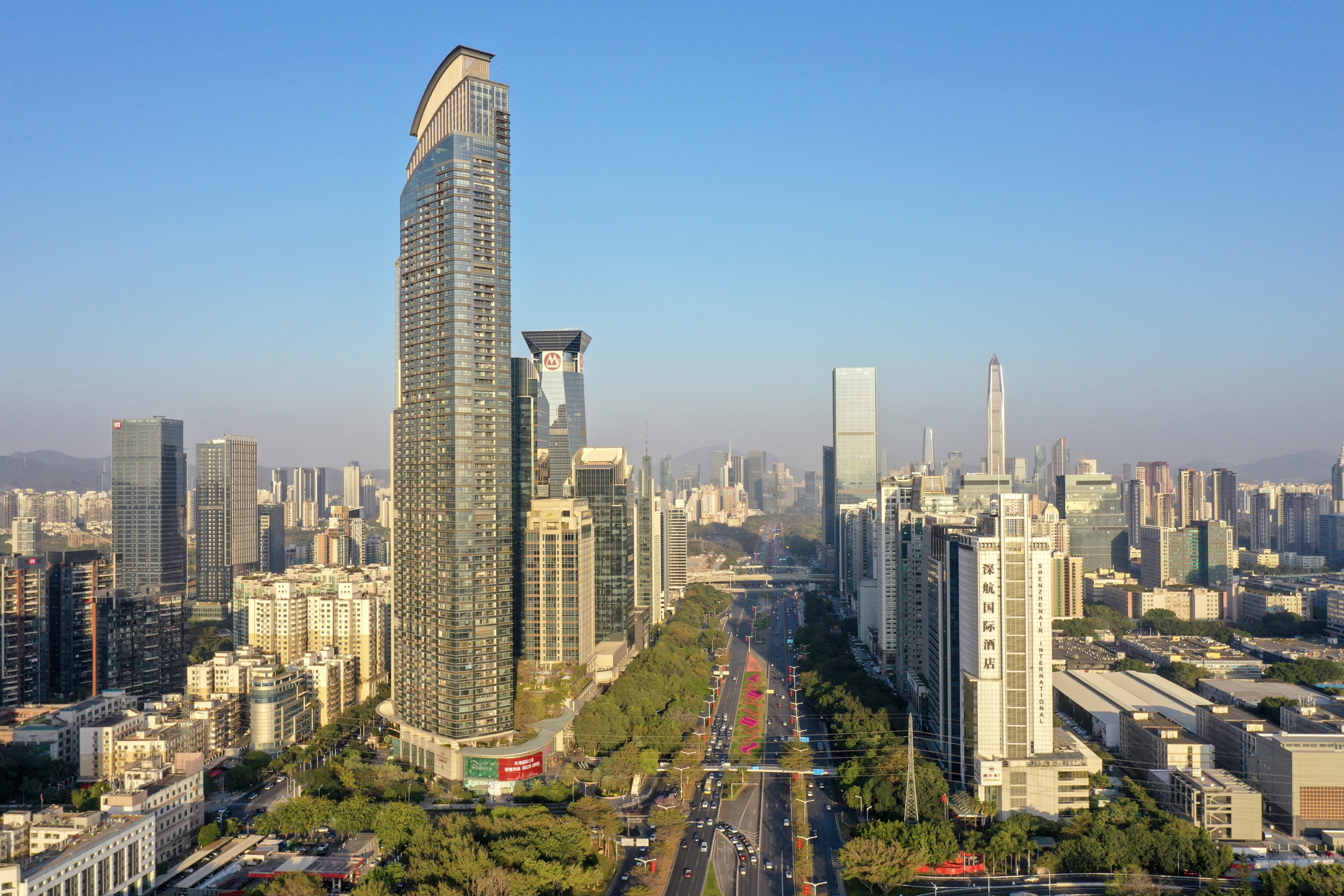
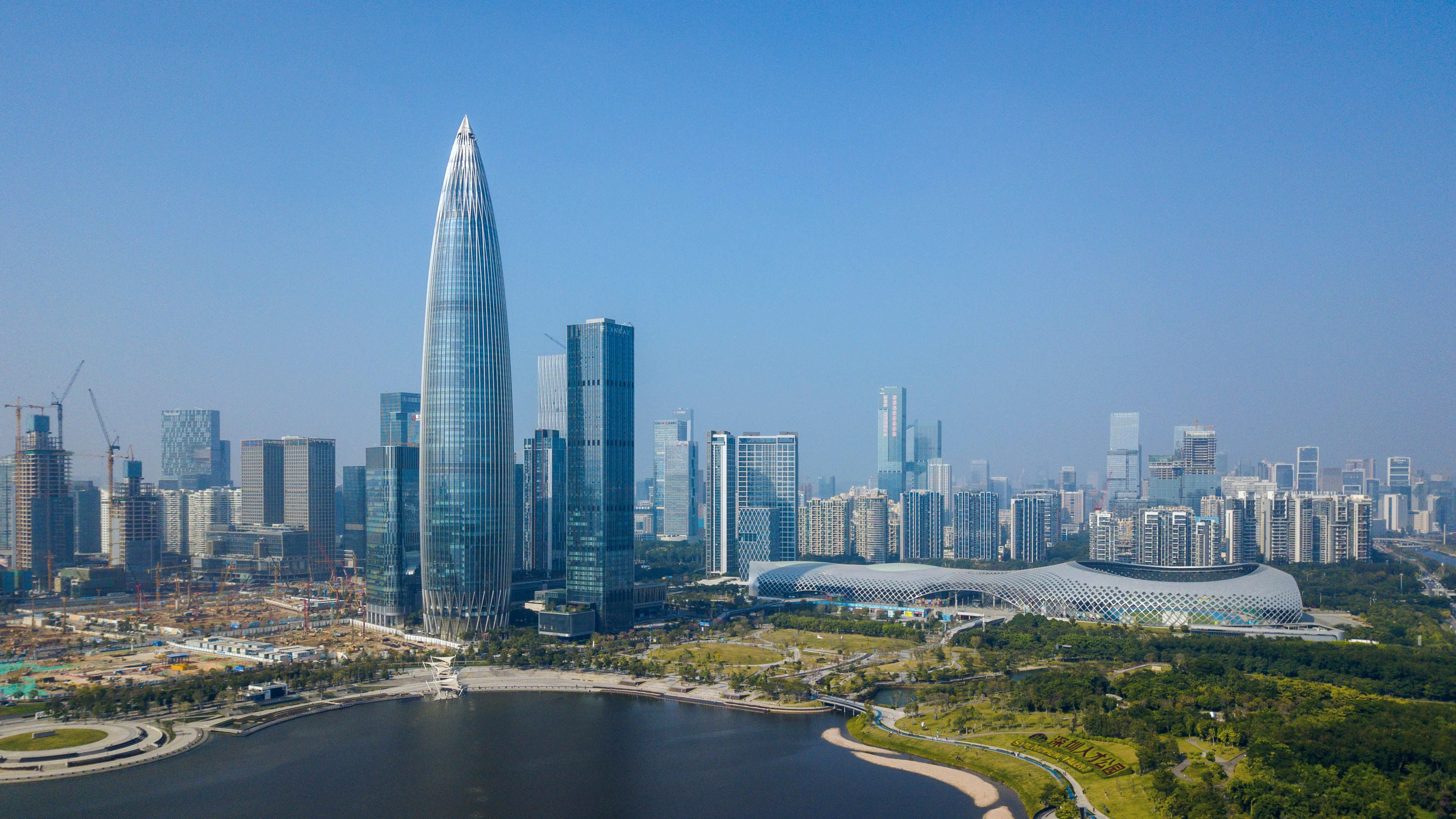
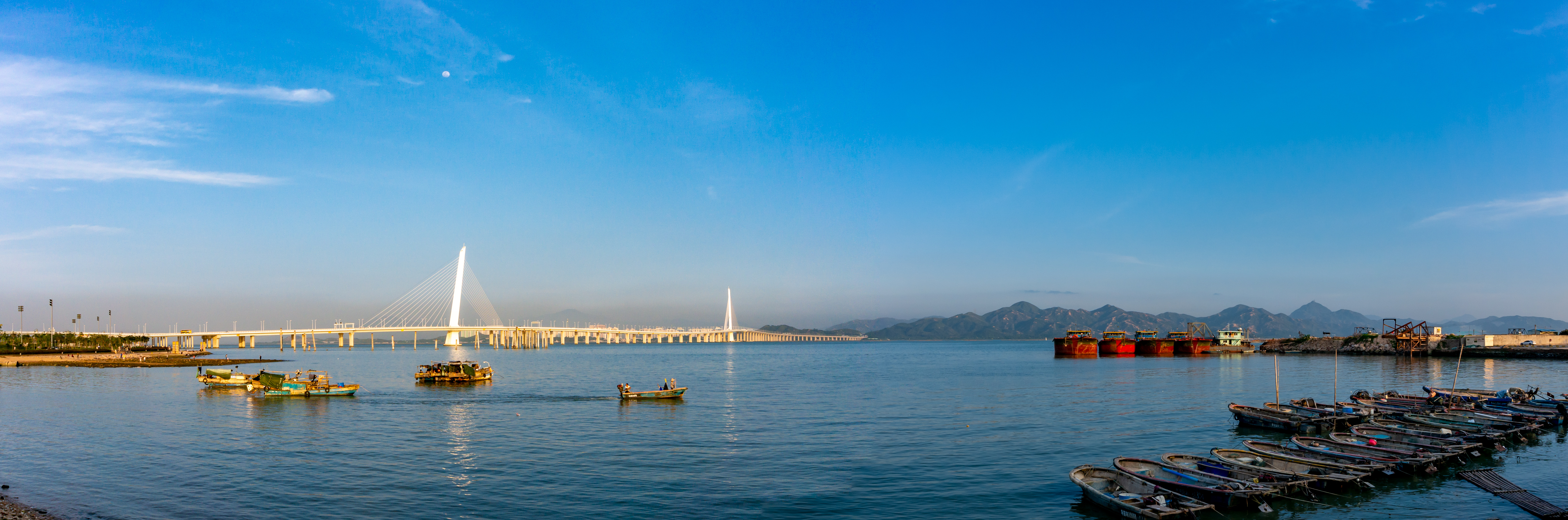
- Aerial view of Futian CBD KK100 and Shun Hing Square Huaqiangbei Shennan Road Houhai CBD on Shenzhen Bay Shenzhen Bay Bridge

- Location of Shenzhen City jurisdiction in Guangdong

- Location of the city center in Guangdong Shenzhen (China) Shenzhen (Asia)
- Coordinates (Civic Center (市民中心)): 22°32′48″N 114°3′16″E
- Country: China
- Province: Guangdong
- County-level divisions: 9
- Settled: 331
- Village: 1953
- City: 23 January 1979
- SEZ formed: 1 May 1980
- Municipal seat: Futian District

Government
  - Type: Sub-provincial city
  - Body: Shenzhen Municipal People's Congress
  - Party Secretary: Jin Lei
  - Congress Chairman: Dai Yunlong
  - Mayor: Li Yun
  - Municipal CPPCC Chairperson: Lin Jie

Area
  - City: 1,997 km^{2} (771 sq mi)
  - Urban: 1,748 km^{2} (675 sq mi)
- Elevation: 0–943.7 m (0–3,096 ft)

Population (2020)
  - City: 17,560,000
  - Rank: 1st in Guangdong; 3rd in China; 6th in Asia
  - Density: 8,793/km^{2} (22,770/sq mi)
  - Urban (2021): 14,678,000
  - Urban density: 8,397/km^{2} (21,750/sq mi)
  - Metro (2010): 23,300,000
  - Major ethnicities: Han

GDP (Nominal, 2025)
  - City: CN¥ 3,873 billion US$ 557 billion
  - Per capita: CN¥ 215,286; US$ 30,979
- Time zone: UTC+8 (China Standard)
- Postal code: 518000
- Area code: 755
- ISO 3166 code: CN-GD-03
- Licence plate prefixes: 粤B
- City flower: Bougainvillea
- City trees: Lychee and mangrove
- Climate: Monsoon-influenced humid subtropical climate (Cwa)
- Website: sz.gov.cn sz.gov.cn/en

Shenzhen
- Chinese: 深圳
- Hanyu Pinyin: Shēnzhèn
- Cantonese Yale: Sāmjan or Sàmjan
- Postal: Shamchun or Shumchun
- Literal meaning: "Deep Drainage"
Transcriptions
Standard Mandarin
- Hanyu Pinyin: Shēnzhèn
- Bopomofo: ㄕㄣ ㄓㄣˋ
- Gwoyeu Romatzyh: Shenjenn
- Wade–Giles: Shen^{1}-chen^{4}
- Tongyong Pinyin: Shenjhèn
- Yale Romanization: Shēnjèn
- MPS2: Shēnzhèn
- IPA: [ʂə́n.ʈʂə̂n]
Wu
- Wugniu: sen^{1} tsen^{5}
- IPA: Shanghainese: [sən˥ tsən˨]; Suzhounese: [sən˦ tsən]
Hakka
- Romanization: cim1 zun4
Yue: Cantonese
- Yale Romanization: Sāmjan or Sàmjan
- Jyutping: sam^{1} zan^{3}
- Hong Kong Romanisation: Sham Chun
- IPA: [sɐm˥.tsɐn˧] or [sɐm˥˧.tsɐn˧]
Southern Min
- Hokkien POJ: Chhim-chùn
- Tâi-lô: Tshim-tsùn
- Bbánlám Pìngyīm: Cīmzùn
- Teochew Peng'im: Cim^{1}-zung^{3}

Shenzhen (Note: /ˌʃɛnˈdʒɛn/, /ʃɛnˈʒɛn/; Chinese: 深圳; pinyin: Shēnzhèn; Mandarin pronunciation: [ʂə́n.ʈʂə̂n]; Yale romanization of Mandarin: Shēnjèn; Jyutping: sam1 zan3; Postal romanization: Shamchun or Shumchun) is a prefecture-level city in Guangdong, China. A special economic zone, it is located on the east bank of the Pearl River estuary on the central coast of Guangdong, bordering Hong Kong to the south, Dongguan to the north, Huizhou to the northeast, and Macau to the southwest. With a population of 18.2 million in 2025, Shenzhen is the third-most-populous city by urban population in China after Shanghai and Beijing. The Port of Shenzhen is the world's fourth-busiest container port. Shenzhen has established itself as a premier global metropolis with a GDP that has surpassed Hong Kong and Singapore in recent years.

Shenzhen was developed from a largely rural village area into a city in 1979. In the early 1980s, the reform and opening up introduced by Deng Xiaoping resulted in the city becoming the first special economic zone of China due to its close proximity to Hong Kong, attracting foreign direct investment and migrants searching for opportunities. In thirty years, the city's economy and population boomed and has since emerged as a hub for technology, international trade, and finance. As of 2026, Shenzhen has solidified its status as a premier global trading hub, though recent rankings continue to place it alongside other heavyweights like Singapore to rank as the No. 1 mainland Chinese city for foreign trade.

Shenzhen is home to the Shenzhen Stock Exchange, one of the largest stock exchanges in the world by market capitalization, and the Guangdong Free-Trade Zone. Shenzhen is ranked as an Alpha− (global first-tier) city by the GaWC. Its nominal GDP has surpassed not only Hong Kong, but another neighboring city, Guangzhou, and it is now a city with one of the ten largest economies in the world. Shenzhen also has the second-largest number of skyscrapers, fifth-highest number of billionaires, and the seventh-most Fortune Global 500 headquarters of any city in the world. It is also the eighth-most competitive and largest financial center in the world, and the world's 18th largest city by scientific research output, and has several higher education institutions, including Shenzhen University and SUSTech. Shenzhen railway station was the last stop on the mainland Chinese section of the Kowloon–Canton Railway.

The city is a global technology hub. In the media Shenzhen is sometimes called China's Silicon Valley. The city's entrepreneurial, innovative, and competitive-based culture has resulted in the city being home to numerous small manufacturers and software companies. Several of these firms have become large technology corporations, such as Huawei, Tencent, DJI, and Oppo. As an important international city, Shenzhen hosts numerous national and international events every year, such as the 2011 Summer Universiade and the China Hi-Tech Fair. Shenzhen is home to the main operations of BYD Company, and is the largest automobile manufacturing city in China. A large portion of Shenzhen's population are migrants from all over China, and the city's population structure skews younger than most cities in China.

== Toponymy ==
The earliest recorded mention of the name Shenzhen is in 1410, during the Ming dynasty, but a market town was not established in the area until the Qing dynasty. Shenzhen literally means "deep ditch" in the local vernacular; the words 圳 zhen and 涌 yong are used colloquially to refer to irrigation ditches. The name was chosen for the city in 1978 by Xi Zhongxun, the father of future Chinese paramount leader Xi Jinping and the Party Secretary of Guangdong at the time.

== History ==
=== Prehistory to early republic era ===
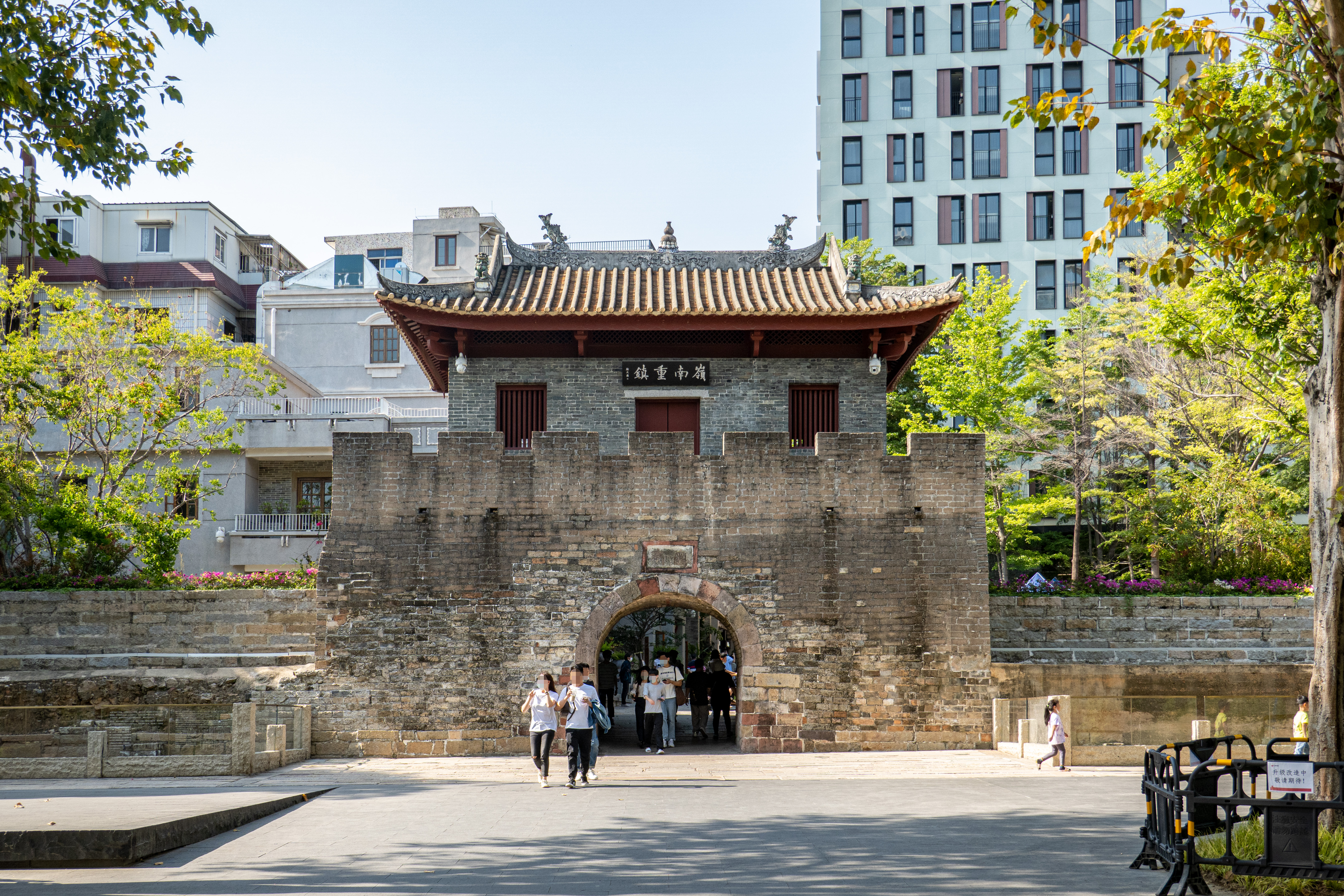
Nantou Historic Town

The oldest evidence of humans in the area on which Shenzhen was established dates back during the mid-Neolithic period. Humans have inhabited the area throughout the past 6,700 years. Historic counties were first established in the area 1,700 years ago. The historic towns of Nantou and Dapeng, were built on the area that is now Shenzhen over 600 years ago.

In 214 BC, when Emperor Qin Shi Huang unified China under the Qin dynasty, the area was submitted to the jurisdiction of the established Nanhai Commandery, one of the three commanderies that were set up in Lingnan, and was assimilated into Zhongyuan culture. In 331 AD, the Eastern Jin administration split up Nanhai and established a new Dongguan Commandery (东官郡). The seat of both the commandery and Bao'an County, one of its six counties, was located around the modern town of Nantou. In 590, the Sui administration merged the region back into Nanhai. In 757, the Tang administration renamed the county Dongguan, and moved its seat to what is now Dongguan city, although a military garrison remained.

During the 12th century, Nantou and the surrounding area became an important trade hub for salt and spices in the South China Sea. The area then became known for producing pearls during the 13th century. In the 1362 era, Chinese sailors of a fleet would go to a Mazu temple in Chiwan (in present-day Nanshan District) to pray as they go to Nanyang. The Battle of Tunmen, when the Ming empire won a naval battle against invading Portuguese, was fought south of Nantou at Shenzhen.

To prevent wokou pirates from attacking Shenzhen, its residents were resettled northward. As a result, Bao'an County lost two-thirds of its territory to the neighboring Dongguan and was incorporated into Dongguan in 1669. The mid-19th century Opium Wars resulted in China ceding Hong Kong Island and the Kowloon Peninsula to Britain. On 21 April 1898 China leased the New Territories to Britain for 99 years and in the following year Xin'an was occupied by British forces for roughly six months. From the 3,076 square kilometres (1,188 mi^{2}) of territory that Xin'an held before the treaties, 1,055.61 square kilometres (407.57 mi^{2}) of the county was ceded to Britain.

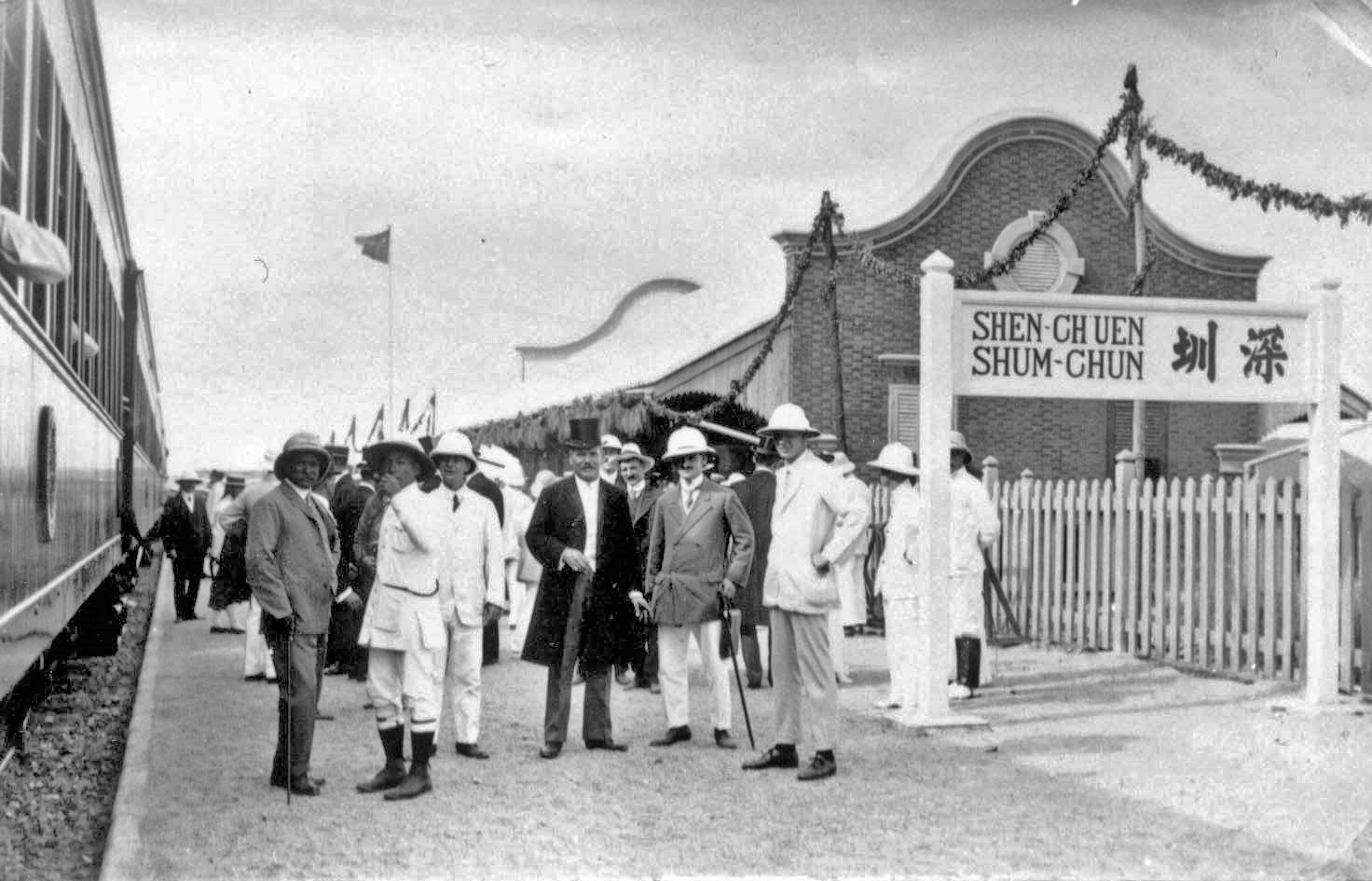
The opening of Shenzhen (Shumchun) station, October 1911

In response to the Wuchang Uprising in 1911, Xin'an residents rebelled against the local Qing administration and successfully overthrew them. In the same year the Chinese section of the Kowloon–Canton Railway (KCR) was opened to the public. The last stop on the Chinese side was Shenzhen railway station, helping the town's economy and opened Shenzhen up to the world. In 1913, the Republic of China administration renamed Xin'an County back to Bao'an County to prevent confusion from another county of the same name in Henan.

During the Canton–Hong Kong strike in 1925, the All-China Federation of Trade Unions set up a reception station for strike workers in Hong Kong in Shenzhen. Strike workers were also given pickets and armored vehicles by the strike committee to create a blockade around Hong Kong. In 1931 Chen Jitang and his family established several casinos in Shenzhen, the largest of which being Shumchun Casino.

During World War II, the Japanese occupied Shenzhen and Nantou, forcing the Bao'an County government to relocate to the neighboring Dongguan County. In 1941, the Imperial Japanese Army tried to cross into Hong Kong through the Lo Wu Bridge in Shenzhen, though the bridge was blown up by British forces, which prevented the Japanese from entering Hong Kong that way.

=== 1950s to 1980 ===
In 1953, four years after the founding of the People's Republic of China, the Bao'an County government decided to move to Shenzhen, since the town was closer to the KCR and had a larger economy than Nantou. From the 1950s to the end of the 1970s, Shenzhen and the rest of Bao'an County oversaw a huge influx of refugees trying to escape to Hong Kong from the upheavals that were occurring in mainland China, and a range from 100,000 to 560,000 refugees resided in the county.

In January 1978, a Central Inspection Team sent by the State Council investigated and established the issue of creating a foreign trade port in Bao'an County. In May, the investigation team wrote the "Hong Kong and Macao Economic Investigation Report" and proposed to turn Bao'an County and Zhuhai into commodity export bases. In August 1978, the Huiyang District Committee reported to the Provincial Committee on the "Report on the Request for the Change of Bao'an County to Shenzhen". On 18 October, the Standing Committee of the Guangdong Provincial Party Committee decided to change Bao'an County into Bao'an City and to turn it into a medium-level prefecture-level city with a foreign trade base. The Huiyang District Committee and the Bao'an County Committee, however, defended the change to rename Bao'an County to Shenzhen, claiming that people in the world know more about Shenzhen and its port than they know about Bao'an County.

On 23 January 1979, the Guangdong provincial administration and the district of Huiyang announced their proposal to rename Bao'an County to Shenzhen and was approved and put into effect by the State Council on 5 March of that year. Also, the city would establish six districts: Luohu, Nantou, Songgang, Longhua, Longgang and Kuiyong. On 31 January 1979, the Central Committee of the Communist Party approved a plan to establish the Shekou Industrial Zone in Shenzhen with the purpose "to lead domestic, overseas, and diversified operations, industrial and commercial integration, and trading" based on the systems of that of Hong Kong and Macau. The Shekou Industrial Zone project was led by Hong Kong-based China Merchants Group under Yuan Geng's leadership and was to become the first export processing industrial zone in mainland China.

At the beginning of April 1979, the Standing Committee of Guangdong Province discussed and proposed to the Central Committee to set up a "trade cooperation zone" in Shenzhen, Zhuhai, and Shantou. In the same month, the Central Working Conference decided on the "Regulations on Vigorously Developing Foreign Trade to Increase Foreign Exchange Income" and agreed to pilot the first special economic zones (SEZ) in Shenzhen, Zhuhai, Shantou, and Xiamen. In November, Shenzhen was elevated to the status of prefecture-level city at the regional level by the Guangdong provincial administration. Hundreds of small villages nearby, such as Yumin Cun, were incorporated into Shenzhen.

=== Special Economic Zone (1980s–present) ===
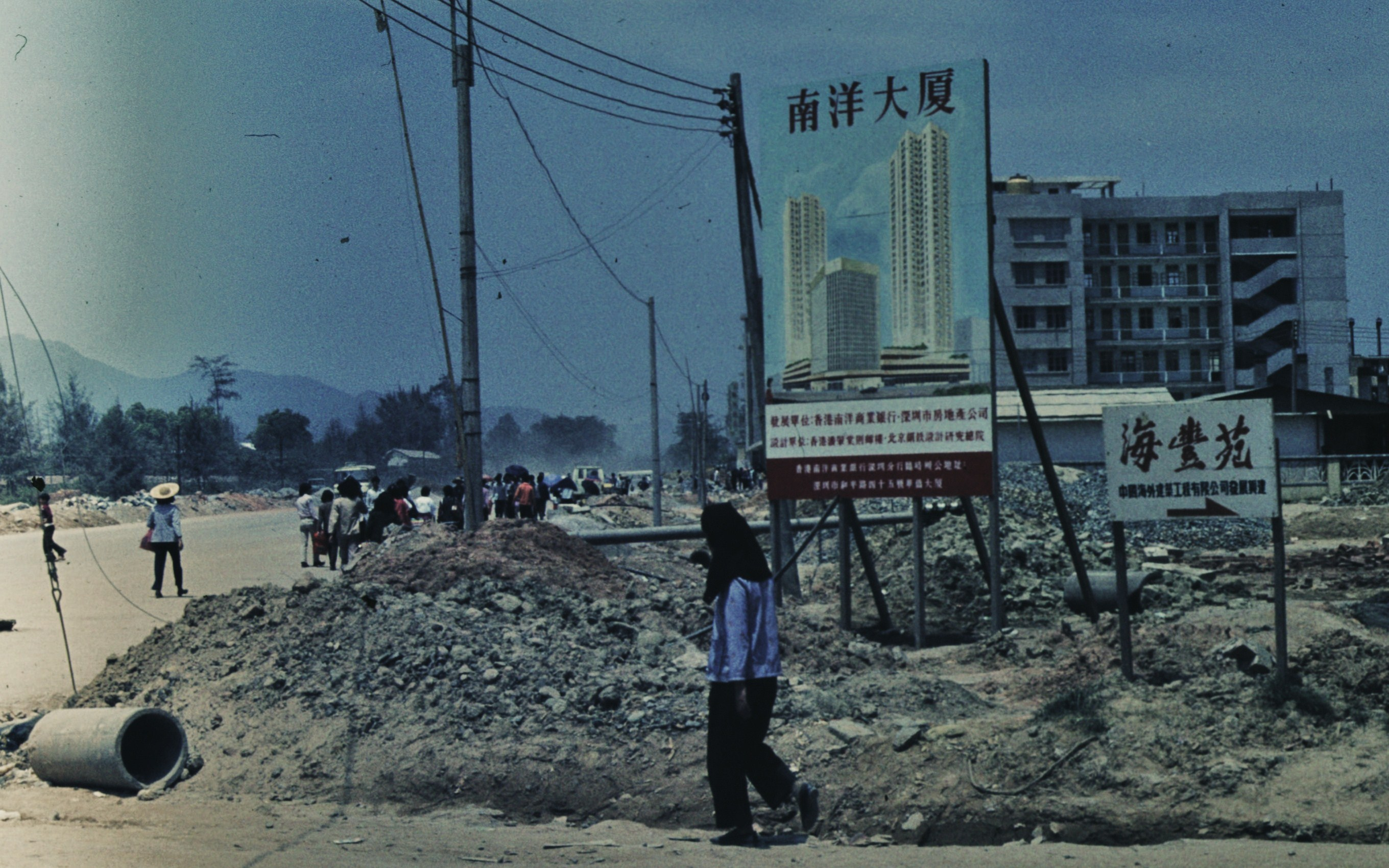
Billboards of high-rise construction in Shenzhen, 1982

In 1980, Shenzhen had a population of 30,000. In May 1980 the Central Committee designated Shenzhen as the first SEZ in China, which was promoted by then-paramount leader Deng Xiaoping as part of China's reform and opening up. Its objective is to be an experimental ground for the practice of market capitalism within a community guided by the ideals of socialism with Chinese characteristics. On 26 August, the Standing Committee of the National People's Congress (NPC) approved the "Regulations of the Guangdong Special Economic Zone." In March 1981 Shenzhen was promoted to a sub-provincial division.

A proposal for Shenzhen to develop its own currency was officially considered, but rejected due to various risks and a belief that China should not maintain multiple, competing currencies.

To enforce law and order in the city, the Shenzhen government erected barbed wire and checkpoints between the land borders of the main sections of the SEZ and the SEZ outskirts, as well as the rest of China, in 1983, which was known as the second line border. Much of Shenzhen's urban development in the 1980s focused in the area around the old border crossing and the market town. Its urbanization was typical for the 1980s.

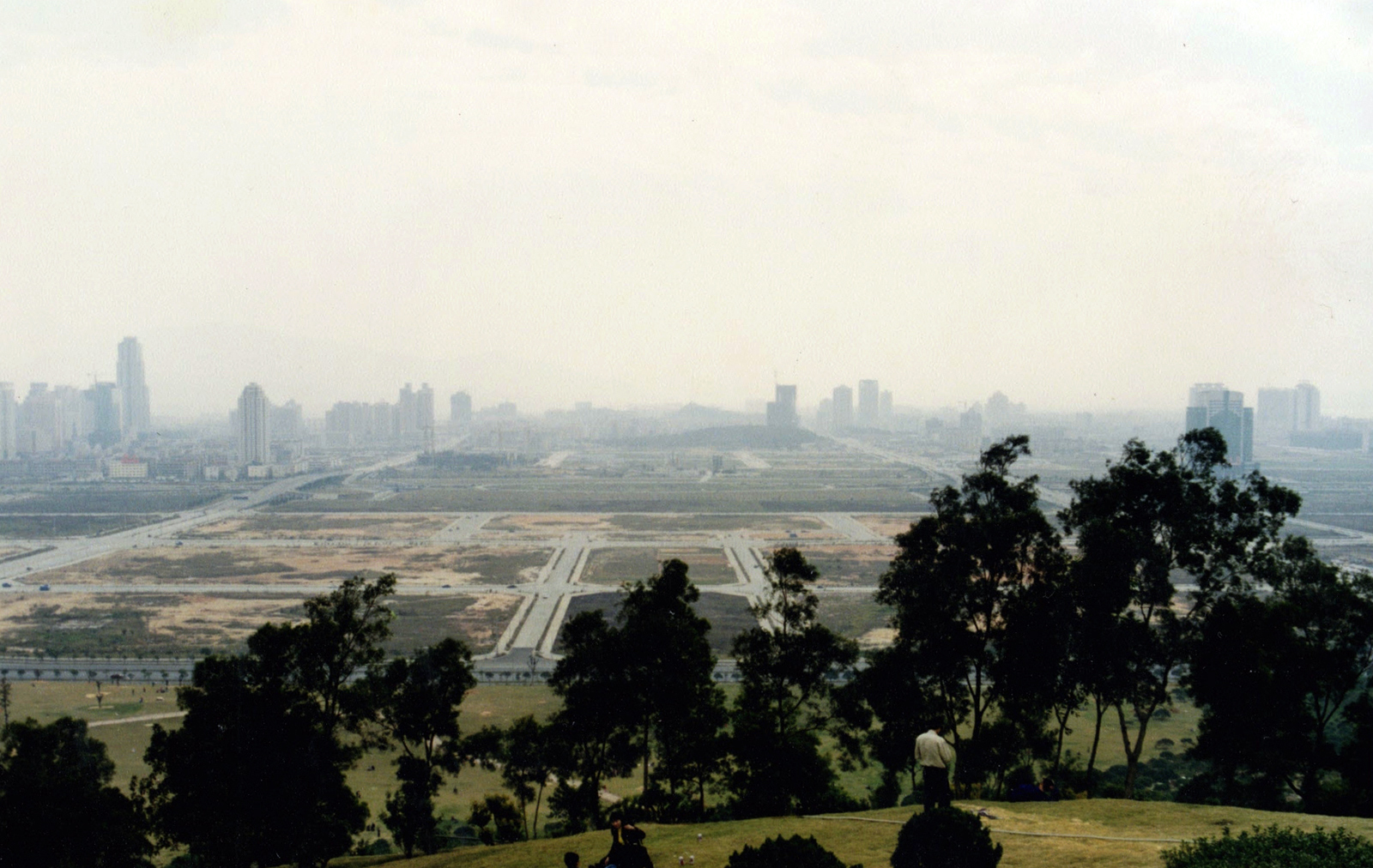
Futian CBD in the spring of 1998 from Lianhuashan Park

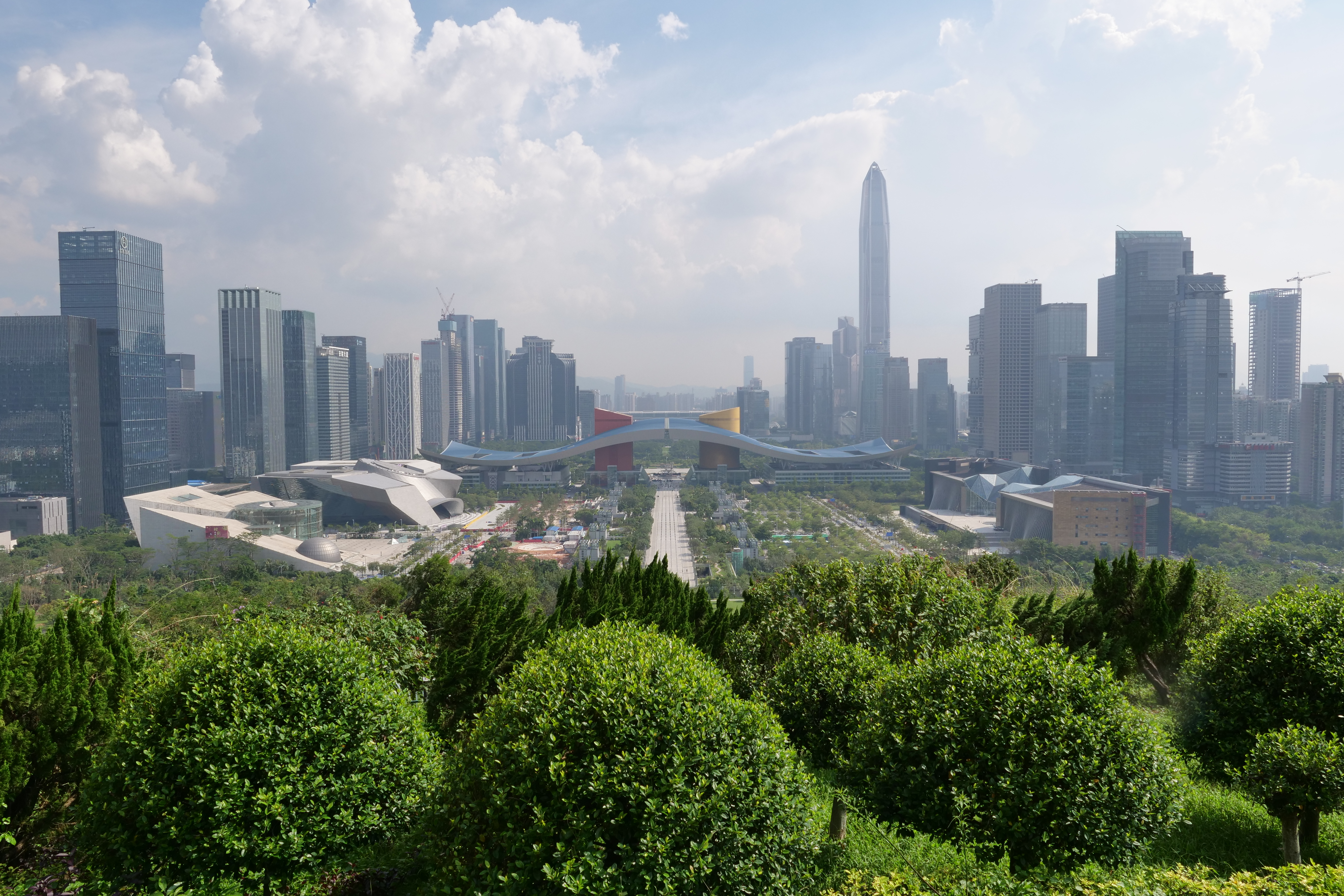
Futian CBD from Lianhuashan Park in 2018

In December 1990, under the authority of the China Securities Regulatory Commission, the Shenzhen Stock Exchange was established to provide a platform for centralized securities trading. In February 1992, the Standing Committee of the NPC granted the government of Shenzhen the power to make local laws and regulations. In 1996 and early 1997, the Shenzhen Guesthouse Hotel in Shenzhen was home to the Provisional Legislative Council and Provisional Executive Council of Hong Kong in preparation for the handover of Hong Kong in 1997. By 2001, as a result of Shenzhen's increasing economic prospects, increasing numbers of migrants from mainland China chose to go to Shenzhen and stay there instead of trying to illegally cross into Hong Kong. There were 9,000 captured border-crossers in 2000, while the same figure was 16,000 in 1991. Around the same time, Shenzhen hosted the second Senior Officials' Meeting of APEC China 2001 on 26 May 2001 in its southern manufacturing center and port. In May 2008, the State Council approved the Shenzhen SEZ to promote Shenzhen's administrative management system, economic system, social field, independent innovation system and mechanism, system and mechanism for opening up and regional cooperation, and resource conservation and environmental friendliness.

On 1 July 2010 the State Council dissolved the "second line", and expanded the Shenzhen SEZ to include all districts, a five-fold increase over its pre-expansion size. On 26 August 2010, on the 30th anniversary of the establishment of the Shenzhen SEZ, the State Council approved the "Overall Development Plan for Qianhai Shenzhen-Hong Kong Modern Service Industry Cooperation Zone." In August 2011, the city hosted the 26th Universiade, an international multi-sport event organized for university athletes. In April 2015, the Shekou Industrial Zone and the Qianhai Zone were integrated within the newly established Guangdong Free-Trade Zone.

On 18 August 2019 the central government in Beijing unveiled reform plans covering economic, social, and political sectors of Shenzhen, labeling Shenzhen a pilot demonstration zone for socialism with Chinese characteristics.

== Geography ==
Shenzhen

Climate chart (precipitation, max. and min. temperature)
J	F	M	A	M	J	J	A	S	O	N	D
26 20 13	48 20 14	70 23 17	154 26 20	237 30 24	347 31 26	320 32 26	354 32 26	254 31 25	63 29 23	35 25 18	27 22 14
- █ Average max. and min. temperatures in °C
- █ Precipitation totals in mm
- Source: Shenzhen Meteorological Bureau 1981–2010 normals
Imperial conversion
J	F	M	A	M	J	J	A	S	O	N	D
1 68 55	1.9 68 57	2.8 73 62	6.1 79 69	9.3 85 74	14 88 78	13 90 79	14 90 79	10 88 77	2.5 85 73	1.4 78 65	1.1 71 57
- █ Average max. and min. temperatures in °F
- █ Precipitation totals in inches

Shenzhen roughly follows the administrative boundaries of the historical Bao'an County. The southern portion of Bao'an County became part of British Hong Kong after the Opium Wars, while the village of Shenzhen was on the border. Shenzhen railway station was the last stop on the mainland Chinese section of the Kowloon–Canton Railway, and Shenzhen's economy grew and it became a city by 1979.

Shenzhen is located within the Pearl River Delta, bordering Hong Kong to the south, Huizhou to the north and northeast, Dongguan to the north and northwest, Lingdingyang and Pearl River to the west, and Mirs Bay to the east, and roughly 100 kilometres (62 mi) southeast of the provincial capital, Guangzhou. As of the end of 2017, the resident population of Shenzhen was 12,528,300, of which the registered population was 4,472,200, the actual administrative population was over 20 million. It makes up part of the Pearl River Delta built-up area with 44,738,513 inhabitants, spread over 9 municipalities (including Macau). The city is elongated measuring 81.4 kilometers from east to west while the shortest section from north to south is 10.8 kilometers.

Over 160 rivers or channels flow through Shenzhen. There are 24 reservoirs within the city limits with a total capacity of 525 million tonnes. Notable rivers in Shenzhen include the Shenzhen River, Maozhou River and Longgang River.

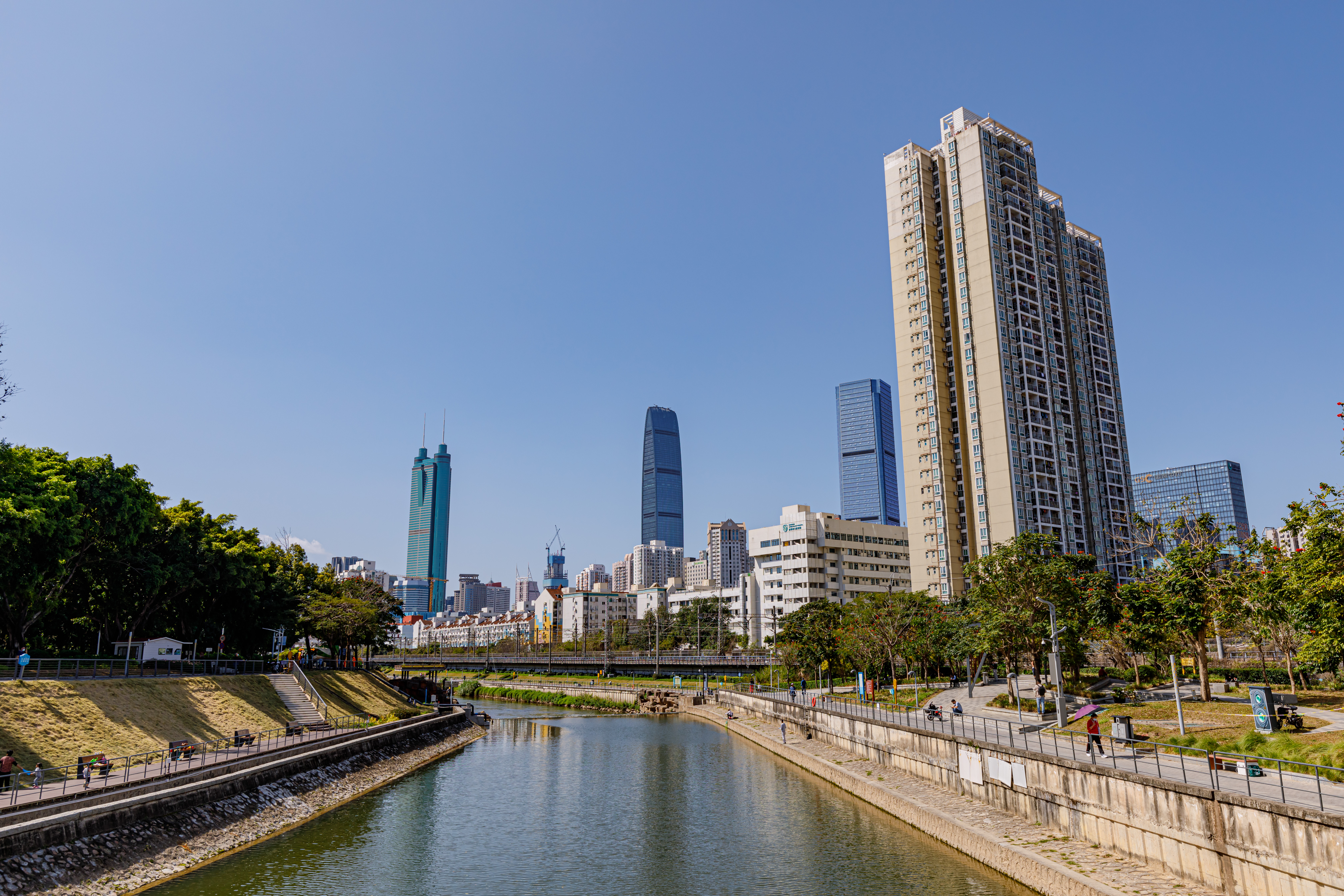
Buji River, a tributary of Shenzhen River

=== Climate ===
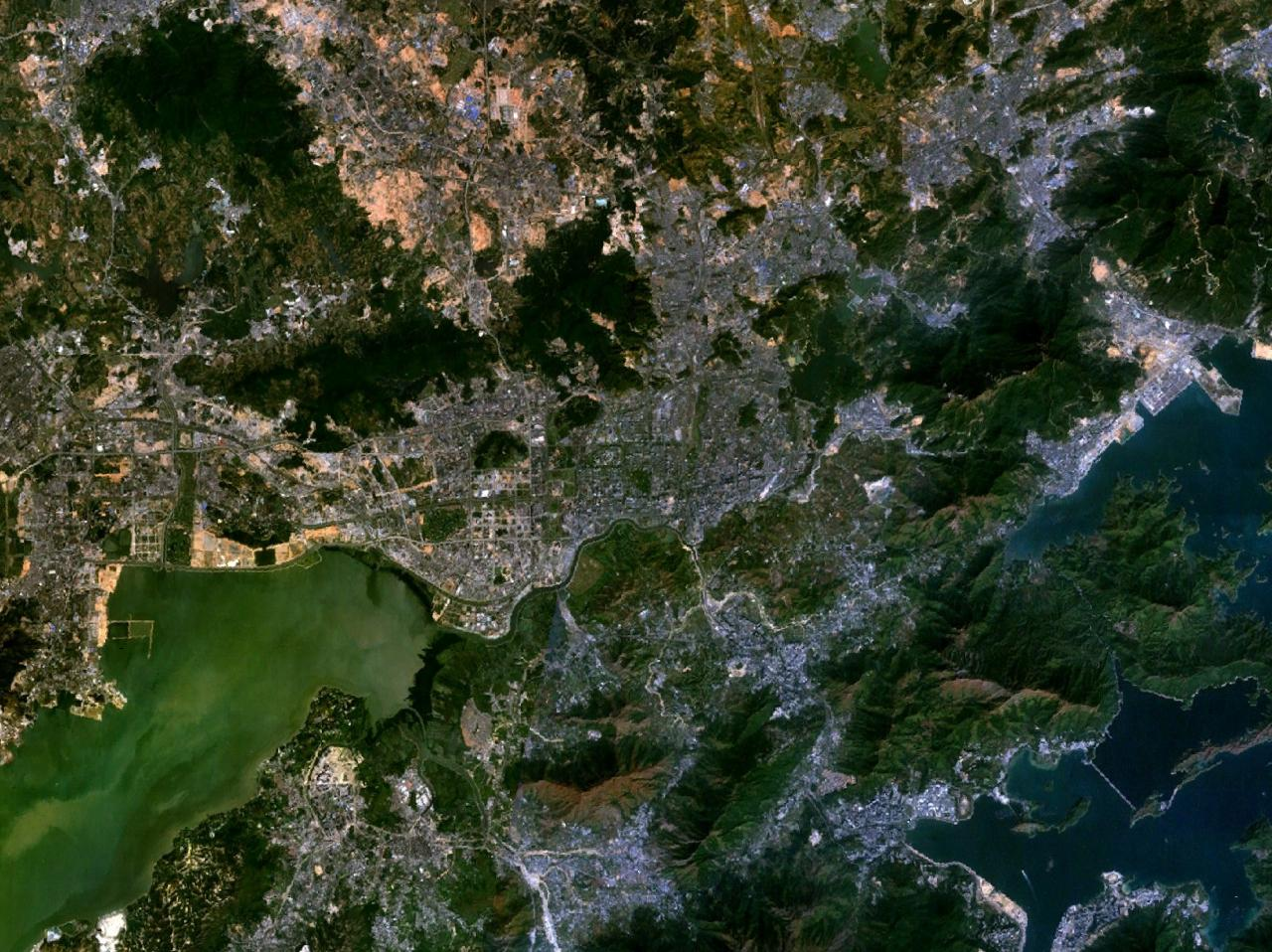
The urban area of Shenzhen in 2005

Although Shenzhen is situated about a degree south of the Tropic of Cancer, due to the Siberian anticyclone it has a warm, monsoon-influenced, humid subtropical climate (Köppen Cwa). Winters are mild and relatively dry, due in part to the influence of the South China Sea, and frost is very rare; it begins dry but becomes progressively more humid and overcast. However, fog is most frequent in winter and spring, with 106 days per year reporting some fog. Early spring is the cloudiest time of year, and rainfall begins to dramatically increase in April; the rainy season lasts until late September to early October. With monthly percent possible sunshine ranging from 27 percent in March to 53 percent in October, the city receives 1,853 hours of bright sunshine annually.

The monsoon reaches its peak intensity in the summer months, when the city also experiences very humid and hot conditions. Despite this, extreme heat is rare, there are only 2.4 days of 35 °C (95 °F)+ temperatures. The region is prone to torrential rain as well, with 9.7 days that have 50 millimetres (2.0 inches) or more of rain, and 2.2 days of at least 100 mm (3.94 in). The latter portion of autumn is dry. The annual precipitation averages at around 1,933 mm (76 in), some of which is delivered in typhoons that strike from the east during summer and early autumn. Extreme temperatures have ranged from 0.2 °C (32 °F) on 11 February 1957 to 38.7 °C (102 °F) on 10 July 1980.

Climate data for Shenzhen, elevation 63 m (207 ft), (1991–2020 normals, extremes 1951–present)
Month	Jan	Feb	Mar	Apr	May	Jun	Jul	Aug	Sep	Oct	Nov	Dec	Year
Record high °C (°F)	29.1 (84.4)	28.9 (84.0)	32.0 (89.6)	34.0 (93.2)	36.8 (98.2)	36.9 (98.4)	38.7 (101.7)	37.1 (98.8)	36.9 (98.4)	35.2 (95.4)	33.1 (91.6)	30.8 (87.4)	38.7 (101.7)
Mean daily maximum °C (°F)	19.8 (67.6)	20.8 (69.4)	23.2 (73.8)	26.7 (80.1)	29.7 (85.5)	31.3 (88.3)	32.3 (90.1)	32.2 (90.0)	31.5 (88.7)	29.2 (84.6)	25.7 (78.3)	21.5 (70.7)	27.0 (80.6)
Daily mean °C (°F)	15.7 (60.3)	16.8 (62.2)	19.4 (66.9)	23.1 (73.6)	26.4 (79.5)	28.3 (82.9)	29.0 (84.2)	28.8 (83.8)	27.9 (82.2)	25.5 (77.9)	21.7 (71.1)	17.4 (63.3)	23.3 (74.0)
Mean daily minimum °C (°F)	13.0 (55.4)	14.2 (57.6)	17.0 (62.6)	20.7 (69.3)	24.0 (75.2)	26.0 (78.8)	26.6 (79.9)	26.3 (79.3)	25.5 (77.9)	22.9 (73.2)	19.0 (66.2)	14.5 (58.1)	20.8 (69.5)
Record low °C (°F)	0.9 (33.6)	0.2 (32.4)	3.4 (38.1)	8.7 (47.7)	14.8 (58.6)	19.0 (66.2)	20.0 (68.0)	21.1 (70.0)	16.9 (62.4)	9.3 (48.7)	4.9 (40.8)	1.7 (35.1)	0.2 (32.4)
Average rainfall mm (inches)	35.2 (1.39)	36.8 (1.45)	64.0 (2.52)	140.1 (5.52)	237.1 (9.33)	368.7 (14.52)	309.5 (12.19)	364.3 (14.34)	242.5 (9.55)	73.4 (2.89)	31.7 (1.25)	29.6 (1.17)	1,932.9 (76.12)
Average rainy days (≥ 0.1 mm)	5.5	7.8	9.9	11.4	14.3	18.4	17.2	16.7	13.2	5.9	4.6	5.2	130.1
Average relative humidity (%)	68	74	77	79	79	80	79	79	75	67	67	64	74
Mean monthly sunshine hours	137.3	101.6	99.7	115.2	153.0	169.8	214.8	178.6	170.1	188.7	168.8	155.4	1,853
Percentage possible sunshine	40	31	27	30	37	42	52	45	47	53	51	47	42
Source 1: Shenzhen Meteorological Bureau
Source 2: CMA

== Politics ==
=== Structure ===
Title	CCP Committee; Secretary	SMPC; Chairman	Mayor of the SMPG	Shenzhen CPPCC; Chairman
Name	Jin Lei	Dai Yunlong	Li Yun	Lin Jie
Ancestral home	Jiyuan, Henan	Huangmei, Hubei	Songzi, Hubei	Yingde, Guangdong
Born	February 1970 (age 56)	August 1960 (age 66)	September 1973 (age 53)	April 1963 (age 63)
Assumed office	March 2026	February 2024	August 2026	September 2020

Like all governing institutions in mainland China, Shenzhen has a parallel party-government system, in which the secretary of the CCP Shenzhen Municipal Committee outranks the Mayor. The CCP committee acts as the top policy-formulation body, and is typically composed of 12 members (including the secretary).

Despite being a sub-provincial city, Shenzhen as a SEZ still wields a lot of autonomy from the central government. In addition to being promoted to a sub-provincial city, the National People's Congress (NPC) in 1981 granted legislative powers to Shenzhen and other Special Economic Zones, giving the city the privilege to make its own laws and regulations. The Standing Committee of the NPC also granted Shenzhen voted and passed the "Decision on Authorizing the Shenzhen Municipal People's Congress and its Standing Committee and the Shenzhen Municipal People's Government to respectively formulate laws and regulations for implementation in the Shenzhen Special Economic Zone" in order to give fully strengthen Shenzhen's legislative powers without interference from the central government.

=== Corruption ===
There were several cases of high-ranking Shenzhen officials who were arrested on charges relating to corruption. In December 2002, the Shenzhen People's Intermediate Court sentenced Zhao Yucun, former Commissioner of Shenzhen Customs, to life imprisonment for taking bribes of 9 million RMB. In November 2003, the Guangzhou People's Intermediate Court charged former Shenzhen Deputy Mayor Wang Ju with bribery and abuse of power and sentenced him to 20 years in prison. In June 2005, the Shenzhen People's Intermediate Court charged sentenced Luohu District Public Security Director An Huijun to 15 years in prison for accepting bribes. In May 2011, the Zhengzhou Intermediate Court sentenced former mayor Xu Zongheng to the death penalty with a two-year reprieve for accepting bribes up to US$5.4 million.

=== Administrative divisions ===
Shenzhen has direct jurisdiction over nine administrative Districts and one New District:

Administrative divisions of Shenzhen
Division code	Division	Area in km^{2}	Population (2020)	Seat	Postal code	Subdivisions	
Division code	Division	Area in km^{2}	Population (2020)	Seat	Postal code	Subdistricts	Residential communities
440300	Shenzhen	1996.78	17,494,398	Futian	518000	74	775
440303	Luohu	78.75	1,143,801	Huangbei Subdistrict	518000	10	115
440304	Futian	78.65	1,553,225	Shatou Subdistrict	518000	10	115
440305	Nanshan	185.49	1,795,826	Nantou Subdistrict	518000	8	105
440306	Bao'an	398.38	4,476,554	Xin'an Subdistrict	518100	10	123
440307	Longgang*	387.82	3,979,037	Longcheng Subdistrict	518100	11	111
440308	Yantian	74.63	214,225	Haishan Subdistrict	518081	4	23
440309	Longhua	175.58	2,528,872	Guanlan Subdistrict	518110	6	100
440310	Pingshan	167.00	551,333	Pingshan Subdistrict	518118	6	30
440311	Guangming	155.44	1,095,289	Guangming Subdistrict	518107	6	28
	Dapeng	295.05	156,236	Dapeng Subdistrict	518116	3	25
	Qianhai						
* — The stats does not includes the subordinated new district. All new district are management areas; not administrative divisions registered under the Ministry of Civil Affairs. * – Dapeng is subordinate to Longgang

Divisions in Chinese and varieties of romanizations
English	Chinese	Pinyin	Guangdong Romanization	Kejiahua Pinyin Fang'an
Shenzhen City	深圳市	Shēnzhèn Shì	sem1 zen3 xi5	cim1 zun4 si4
Luohu District	罗湖区	Luóhú Qū	lo4 wu4 kêu1	lo2 fu2 ki1
Futian District	福田区	Fútián Qū	fug1 tin4 kêu1	fuk5 tien2 ki1
Nanshan District	南山区	Nánshān Qū	nam4 san1 kêu1	lam5/nam5 san1 ki1
Bao'an District	宝安区	Bǎo'ān Qū	bou2 on1 kêu1	bau3 on1 ki1
Longgang District	龙岗区	Lónggǎng Qū	lung4 gong1 kêu1	lung2 gong1 ki1
Yantian District	盐田区	Yántián Qū	yim4 tin4 kêu1	yam2 tien2 ki1
Longhua District	龙华区	Lónghuá Qū	lung4 wa4 kêu1	lung2 fa2 ki1
Pingshan District	坪山区	Píngshān Qū	ping4 san1 kêu1	piang2 san1 ki1
Guangming District	光明区	Guāngmíng Qū	guong1 ming4 kêu1	gong1 min2 ki1
Dapeng New District	大鹏新区	Dàpéng Xīnqū	dai6 pang4 sen1 kêu1	tai4 pen2 sin1 ki1
Qianhai	前海	Qiánhǎi	qin4 hoi2	

Shenzhen was originally Bao'an County. On 5 March 1979, the State Council of the People's Republic of China dissolved the county and set up the city of Shenzhen in its place initially with six districts: Luohu (罗湖), Nantou (南头), Songgang (松岗), Longhua (龙华), Longgang (龙岗), and Kuiyong (葵涌), with the seat based in Luohu. In October 1981, Bao'an County was re-established, with its region now based outside Shenzhen. In June 1983, the districts were dissolved and re-established instead as five management areas (管理区): Shekou (蛇口; south-west Shenzhen), Nantou (南头; west Shenzhen), Shangbu (上步; central Shenzhen), Luohu (罗湖; east-central Shenzhen), and Shatoujiao (沙头角; far-east Shenzhen). To enforce law and order in the city, the Shenzhen government erected a border known as the second line (Chinese: 二线关), which consisted of barbed wire and checkpoints between the city and the rest of China. Initially, the border control was relatively strict, requiring non-Shenzhen citizens to obtain special permissions for entering. Over the years, border controls have gradually weakened, and permission requirement has been abandoned.

In January 1990, the city merged Shekou Management Area and Nantou Management Area to form the Nanshan District, renamed Shangbu Management Area to the Futian District, and merged Luohu Management Area and Shatoujiao Management Area to form the Luohu District. In December 1992, Bao'an County was dissolved again, with its area taken by Shenzhen and split into two new districts: Bao'an District and Longgang District, though economic privileges within special economics zones did not pertain to them as they were outside the second line border. At this point, Shenzhen has five districts: Luohu, Futian, Nanshan, Bao'an, and Longgang. In March 1998, Shenzhen's government created the Yantian District from the eastern portions of the Luohu District (the original area of the Shatoujiao Management District), and within the second line border. Yantian, Luohu, Futian, and Nanshan together as the special economic districts within the second line border are referred to as guannei (关内; 'within the border') while districts that are outside the second line and do not have special economic privileges such as Bao'an and Longgang are referred to as guanwai (关外; 'outside the border'). The Shenzhen government later established two new districts as part of the guanwai: Guangming New District in August 2007 and Pingshan New District in June 2009.

On 1 July 2010, the second line border was dissolved, and the Shenzhen SEZ was expanded to cover the entire city. Therefore, the four guanwai districts Bao'an District, Longgang District, Guangming New District, and Pingshan New District, would be given special economic privileges like the guannei districts. The area of the Shenzhen SEZ also increased from 396 square kilometres (153 sq mi) to 1,953 square kilometres (754 sq mi). Since June 2015, the existing unused border structures have been demolished and are being transformed into urban greenspaces and parks. On 15 January 2018, the State Council approved the removal of the barbed wire fence set up to mark the boundary of the SEZ.

In early 2011, the provincial government of Guangdong approved the establishment of the Shenzhen-Shantou Special Cooperation Zone in the city and SEZ of Shantou, Guangdong that will last until 2040 with the purpose of economic development. The zone would be managed by Shenzhen and another Cantonese city, Shanwei. The zone is under the jurisdiction of Shenzhen instead of Shantou, with residents living there considered to be permanent residents of Shenzhen.

The Shenzhen government later established two new districts on 27 October 2011, Longhua New District and Dapeng New District. With approval of the State Council, Shenzhen re-organized Longhua New District as Longhua District and Pingshan New District as Pingshan District on 11 October 2016 and Guangming New District as Guangming District on 24 May 2018, therefore becoming their own jurisdictions.

== Economy ==
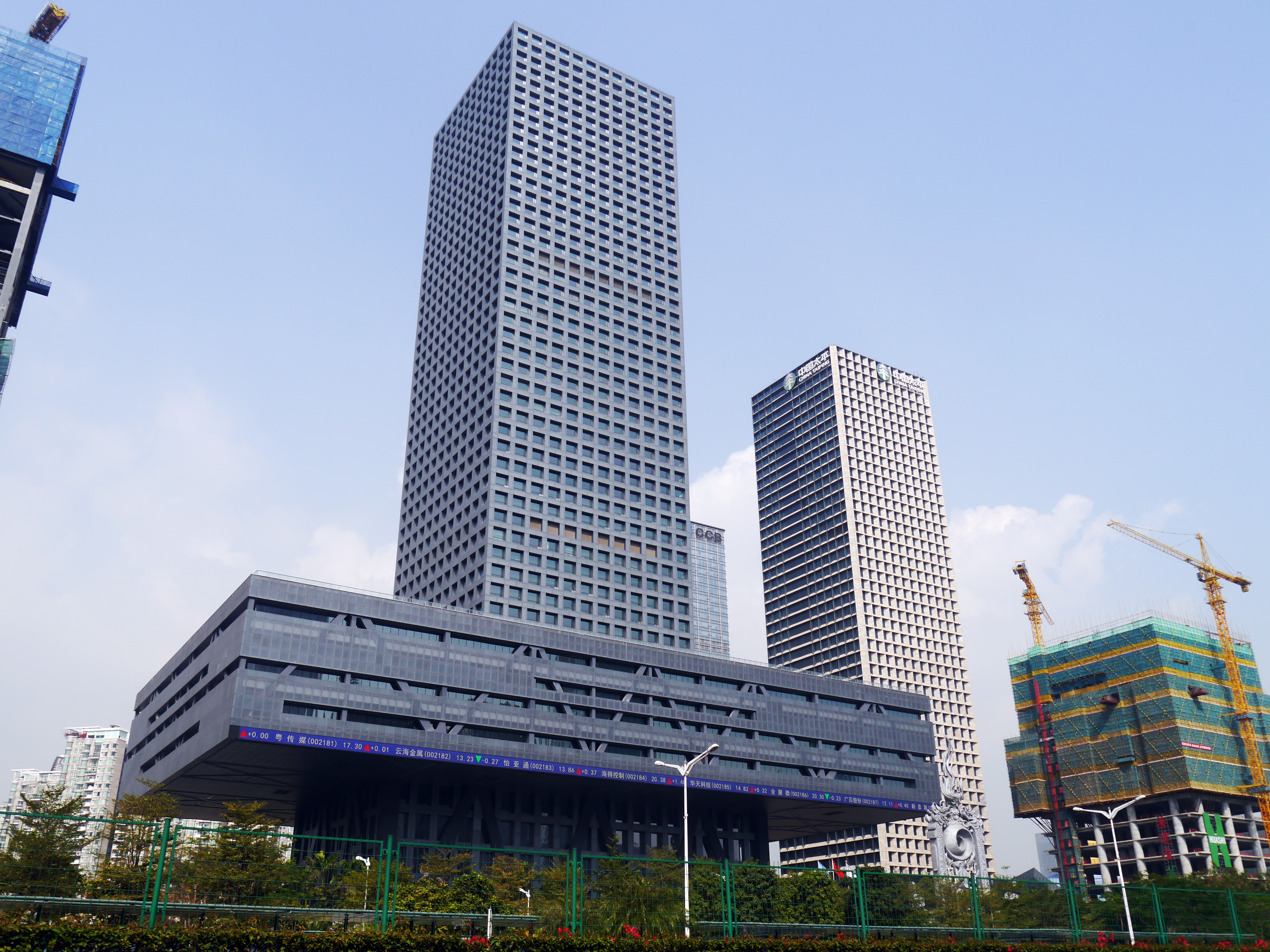
Shenzhen Stock Exchange

Shenzhen was the first of the Special Economic Zones (SEZ) to be established by then paramount leader Deng Xiaoping. Back to Apr 1979, Shenzhen was reformed as a Special Export Zone to create a favorable investment environment and introduce advanced technology and management experience, later renamed to Special Economic Zone in May 1980. As of 2022, Shenzhen has a nominal GDP of 3.24 trillion RMB (HK$2.87 trillion), which surpassed neighboring Hong Kong's GDP of HK$2.11 trillion and Guangzhou's GDP of 2.88 trillion RMB (HK$2.68 trillion), making the economic output of Shenzhen the 3rd largest out of Chinese cities, trailing behind Shanghai and Beijing. In addition, Shenzhen's GDP growth between 2016 and 2017 of 8.8% surpassed that of Hong Kong and Singapore, with 3.7% and 2.5% respectively. With a market capitalization of US$2.5 trillion as of 30 November 2018, the Shenzhen Stock Exchange (SZSE) is the 8th largest exchange in the world.

In the 2021 Global Financial Centres Index, Shenzhen was ranked as having the 8th most competitive and largest financial center in the world and 6th in Asia & Oceania region (after Shanghai, Hong Kong, Singapore, Beijing, and Tokyo). As of 2020, Shenzhen is ranked as an Alpha- (global first-tier) city by the Globalization and World Cities Research Network. According to Forbes, Shenzhen has the fifth-highest number of billionaires of any city in the world. Shenzhen's nominal GDP is projected to be among the world top 10 largest cities in 2035 (together with Beijing, Shanghai and Guangzhou in China) according to a study by Oxford Economics and its nominal GDP per capita will reach above US$57,000 (ranking first in mainland China) in 2030, which is comparable to Tokyo and Seoul.

Shenzhen is part of the 21st Century Maritime Silk Road that runs from the Chinese coast south to the tip of India via the Suez Canal to the Mediterranean, there to the Upper Adriatic region to the northern Italian hub of Trieste with its rail connections to Central Europe and the North Sea.

As of August 2023, Shenzhen has the seventh-most Fortune Global 500 headquarters of any city in the world and the third-most in China after (Beijing and Shanghai) within its city limits.

Shenzhen's historical nominal GDP indicator in the main years
year	GDP			GDP per capita based on mid-yr pop.			XRrate
year	millions of GDP		real growth (%)	GDP per capita		real growth (%)	XRrate
year	CNY	USD	real growth (%)	CNY	USD	real growth (%)	XRrate
^{p}2023	3,460,640	491,101	6.0	195,230	27,705	5.6	7.0467
^{r}2022	3,248,071	482,906	3.4	183,801	27,327	3.3	6.7261
^{r}2021	3,082,010	477,720	7.0	174,542	27,054	5.2	6.4515
^{r}2020	2,775,902	402,445	3.1	159,820	23,170	0.2	6.8976
^{r}2019	2,699,233	391,278	6.7	159,883	23,176	2.8	6.8985
2018	2,526,608	381,813	7.7	155,320	23,471	2.3	6.6174
2017	2,328,027	344,801	8.8	150,739	22,326	2.7	6.7518
2016	2,068,574	311,424	9.3	142,494	21,453	2.7	6.6423
2015	1,843,684	296,012	9.0	135,271	21,718	2.9	6.2284
2014	1,679,535	273,415	8.9	130,448	21,236	3.8	6.1428
2013	1,523,424	245,983	10.6	124,208	20,056	4.6	6.1932
2012	1,349,627	213,802	10.2	116,407	18,441	2.6	6.3125
2011	1,192,281	184,598	10.1	110,389	17,091	3.6	6.4588
2010	1,006,906	148,742	12.3	99,095	14,638	7.8	6.7695
2000	221,920	26,807	16.3	33,276	4,020	5.8	8.2784
1990	17,167	3,589	32.5	11,097	2,320	12.1	4.7832
1980	270	180	62.7	835	557	63	1.4984

== Industry ==
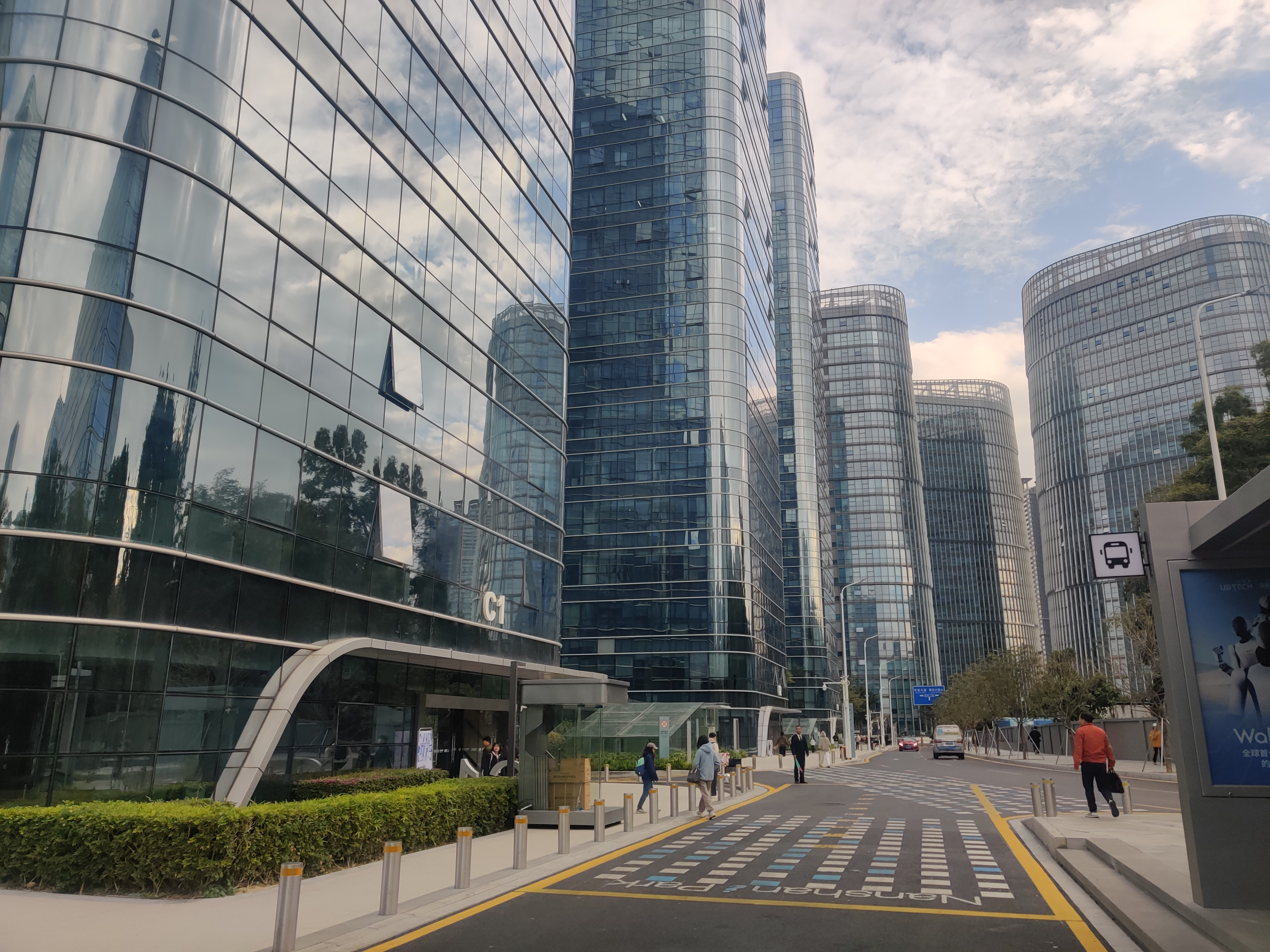
Science and Technology park in Nanshan District

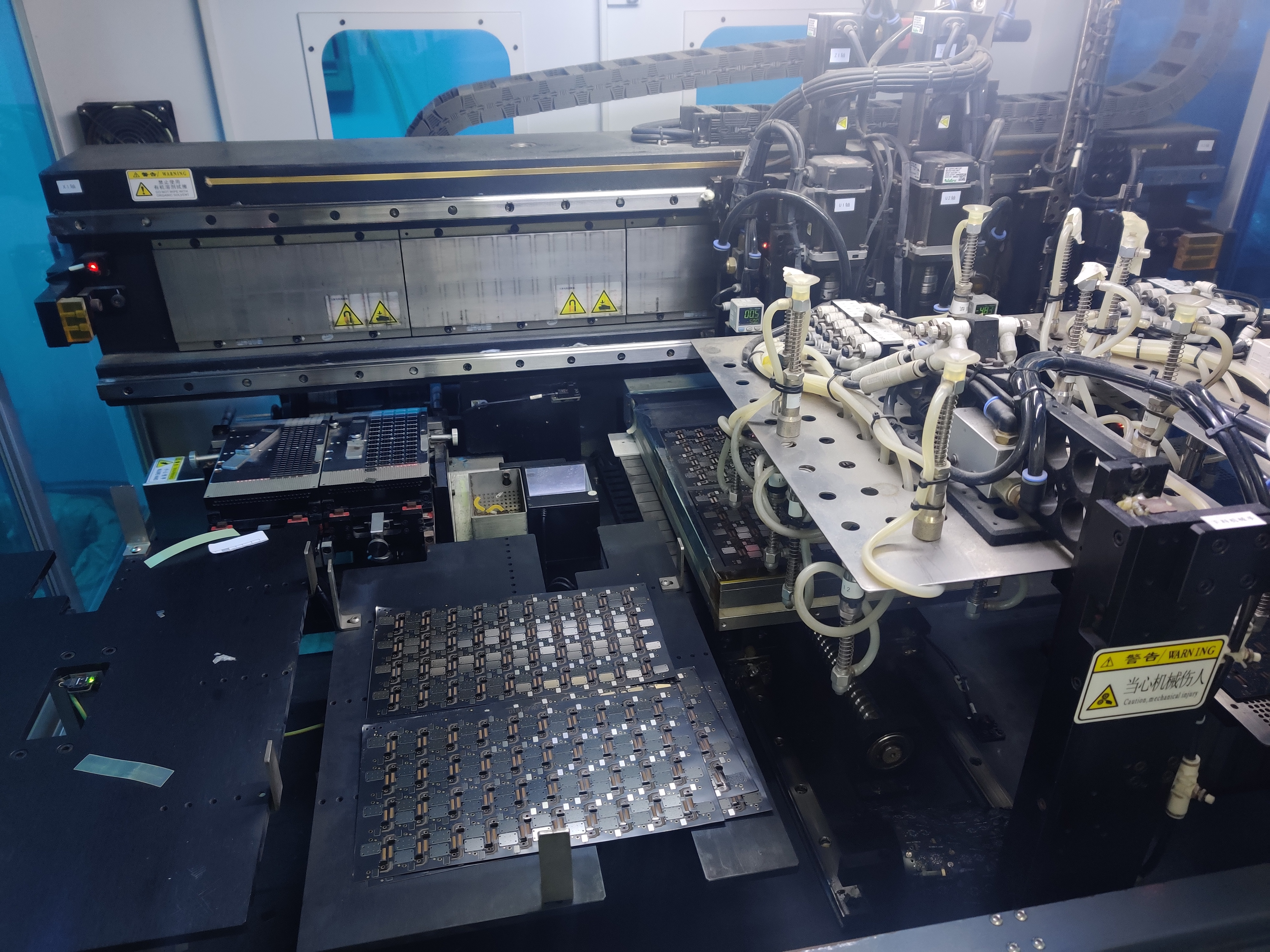
Electronics manufacturing in Shenzhen is highly automated

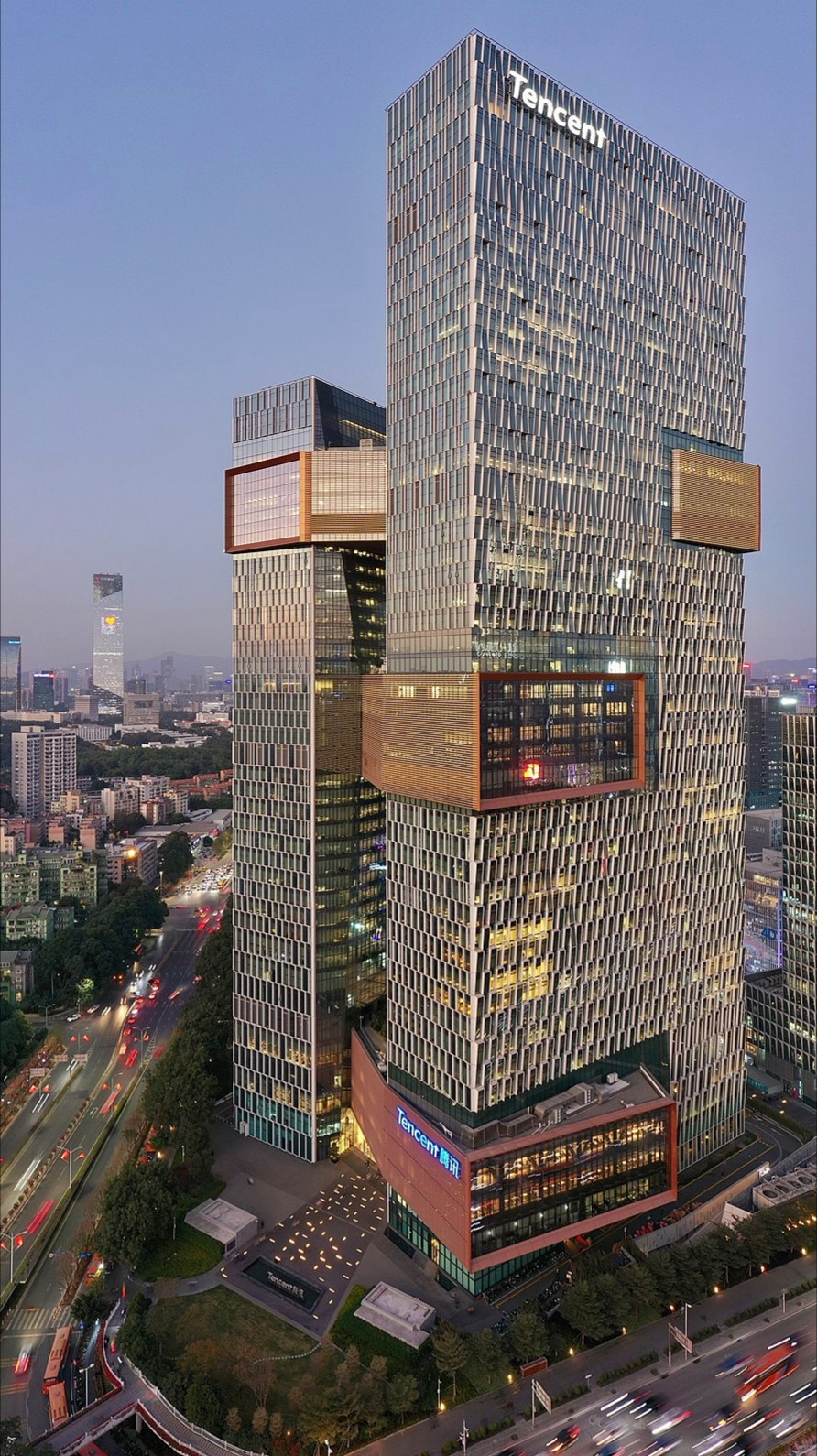
Tencent Binhai Mansion in the Nanshan District, headquarters of Tencent

Shenzhen's industry is described by its Municipal Bureau of Statistics to be upheld by its four-pillar industries: high tech, finance, logistics, and culture.

=== High Tech ===
Shenzhen is a large hub of the Chinese and global technology industry and home to a large startup ecosystem. As of 2020 the city was ranked as the 4th Fintech powerhouse in the world. Shenzhen is primarily known for its high-tech industry, which has a value of 585.491 billion RMB (US$82.9 billion) in 2015, a 13 percent increase compared to last year. Out of the nominal GDP of 1,750.299 billion RMB in 2015 the high-tech industry generated 33.4 percent. Shenzhen is home to a number of prominent tech firms, such as Huawei, Tencent, DJI, and ZTE. Other tech firms include personal computer manufacturer Hasee, Hytera, and OnePlus. Huaqiangbei is a wholesale hub for consumer high-tech products like smartphones and gadgets.

Shenzhen annually holds the China International High-tech Achievements Fair, which showcases high-tech products and provides for dialogue and investment for high-tech. As a result, Shenzhen is dubbed by media outlets as "China's Silicon Valley" or the "Silicon Valley of Hardware" for the world. Shenzhen hosts BYD Company and has become a manufacturer of automobiles; it produced 2.9 million automobiles in 2024, overtaking Guangzhou to become the largest car manufacturing city in China.

=== Financial services ===
Shenzhen is home to a number of large financial institutions, such as China Merchants Bank and Ping An Insurance and its subsidiary Ping An Bank. Since the city's establishment as a SEZ, a number of foreign banks had established offices in the city, including Citibank, HSBC, Standard Chartered, and Bank of East Asia. In total, the financial industry accounts for 14.5% of the city's nominal GDP in 2015 (254.282 billion RMB), which was a 15.9% increase over the previous year. By the end of 2016, the total assets of the financial industry amounted to 12.7 trillion RMB (banking industry assets were 7.85 trillion RMB, security companies assets were 1.25 trillion RMB, and insurance industry assets were 3.6 trillion RMB), making Shenzhen's financial industry the third largest in China.

Shenzhen is one of the world's top ten financial centers as of 2019, jumping five places to ninth place as determined by "variety of areas of competitiveness, including business environment, human capital, infrastructure, financial sector development and reputation."

=== Container port ===
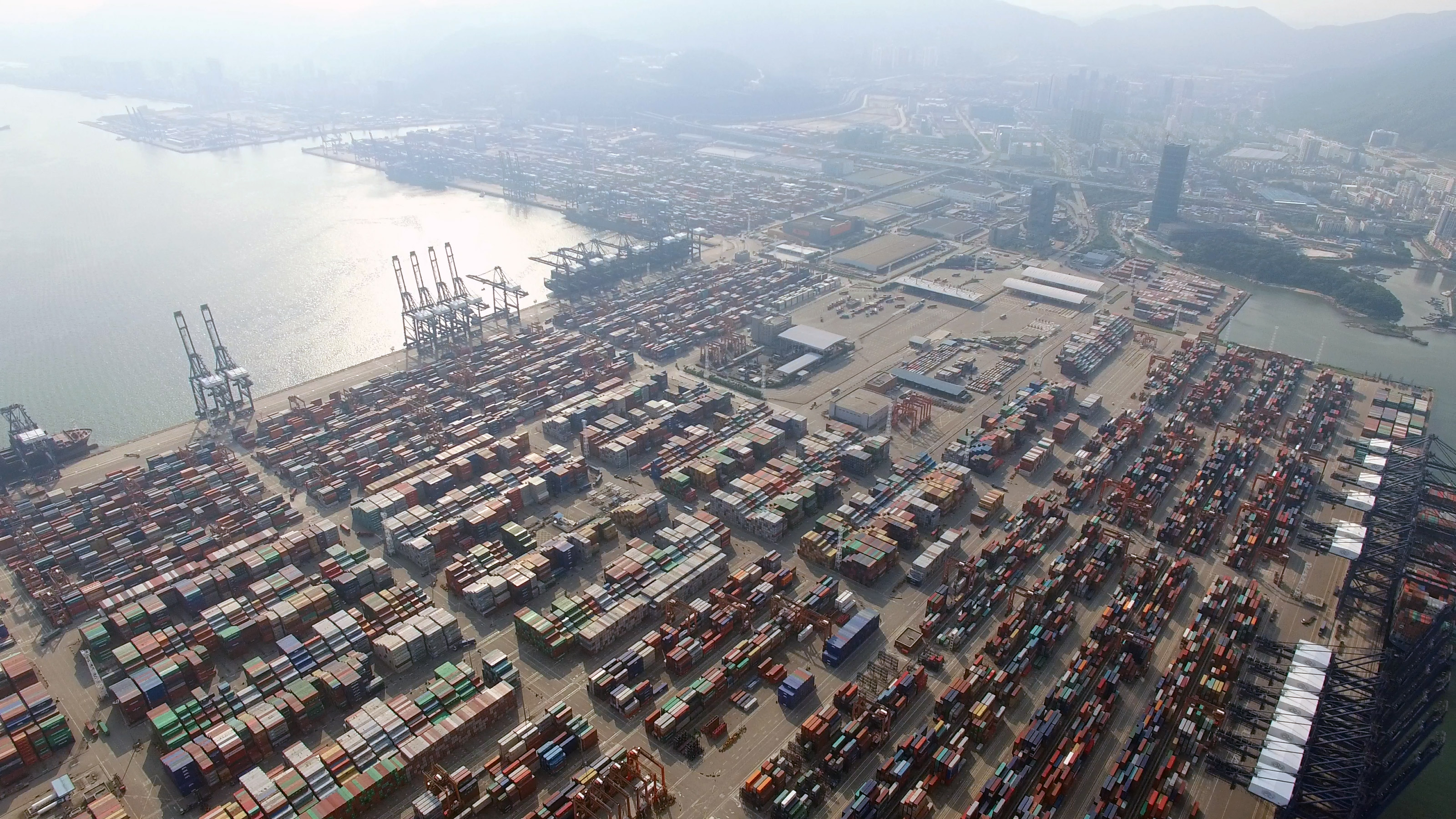
Yantian International Container Terminals in the Yantian District, one of the container terminals of the Port of Shenzhen

SF Express and China International Marine Containers (CIMC) have their headquarters in Shenzhen. The Port of Shenzhen comprises the Yantian International Container Terminals, the Chiwan Container Terminals, the container terminals of the Shekou Industrial Zone, the China Merchants Port, and Shenzhen Haixing. The Port of Shenzhen is therefore capable of handling a record volume of containerization. With rising trade increased cargo shipments in 2005, the container port was ranked as the world's fourth-busiest container port.

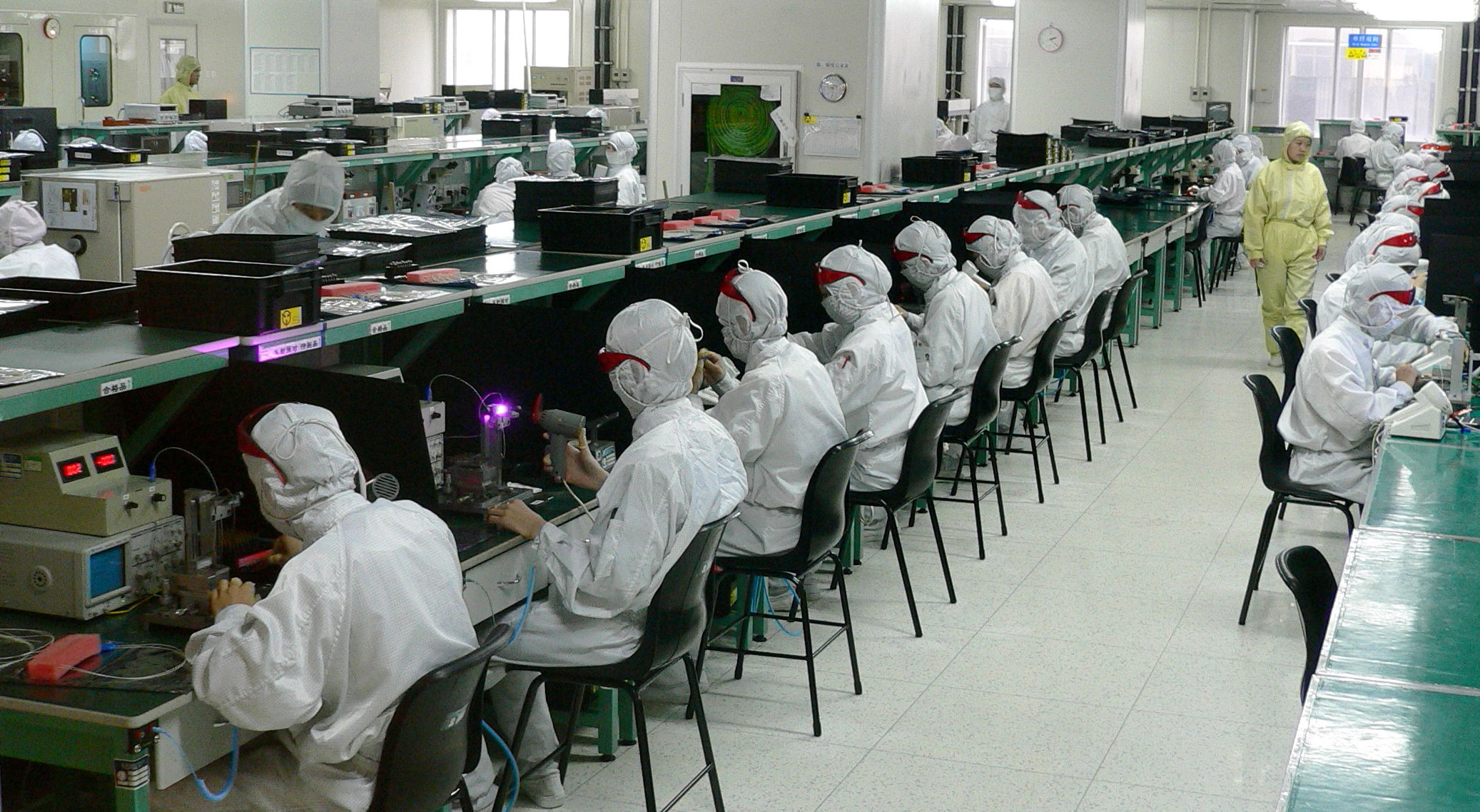
One of the production floors in Foxconn factory at Shenzhen in the past

High port traffic levels combined with a high urban population make Shenzhen a large port megacity. The logistics industry accounts for around 10.1 percent (178.27 billion RMB) of the city's nominal GDP in 2015, which was an increase of 9.4 percent. Shenzhen Port's first foreign trade blockchain cargo release platform was launched in 2021. Also in 2021, a month-long COVID-related slowdown in processing shipping containers at the port caused a shock to global supply chains.

=== Cultural industry ===
Shenzhen had prioritized the cultural industry in according to the 13th Five-Year Plan, establishing the Shenzhen Fashion Creative Industry Association (深圳市时尚文化创意协会) and planning the 4.6 square-kilometer Dalang Fashion Valley (大浪时尚创意城). On 7 December 2008, UNESCO approved Shenzhen's entrance into the Creative Cities Network, and awarded the Shenzhen the title of "United Nations Design Capital". Altogether, the cultural industry in turn contributes to 5.8 percent (102.116 billion RMB) of Shenzhen's economy in 2015.

Shenzhen-based video game developer Game Science released Black Myth: Wukong, which achieved significant commercial success on its 20 August 2024 release. The game is set against the backdrop of the classic novel, Journey to the West.

=== Real estate ===
In addition to the four pillar industries that were listed by the municipal government, Shenzhen also has a relatively notable real-estate industry. The real-estate industry altogether contributes to 9.2 percent (162.777 billion RMB) of Shenzhen's economy in 2015, which was an increase of 16.8 percent compared to the previous year. Real estate developers such as the Evergrande Group, Vanke, and China Resources Land are headquartered within the city.

=== High Tech Industrial Development Zone ===
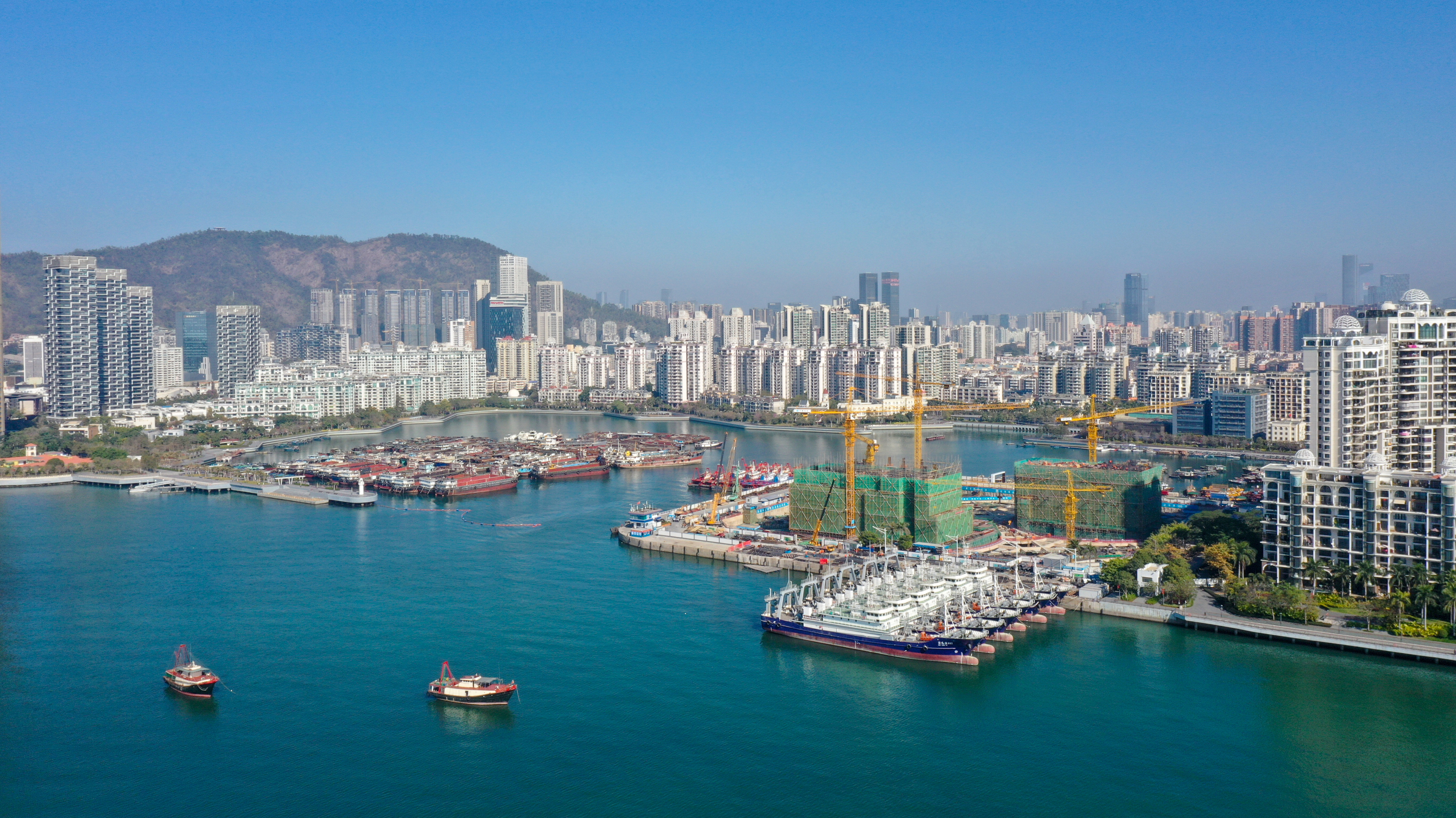
Shekou Fishing Port

In 1996, the State Council approved and established the 11.5 km^{2} (4.4 sq mi) Shenzhen High-tech Industrial Development Zone, helping to develop Shenzhen's high-tech industry in areas such as electronics and information technology. In accordance to the National Plan in 2001, the Shenzhen Software Park, integrated within the High-tech Industrial Development Zone, was established for software production and assists in the development of the city's software industry. On 26 August 2010, the State Council approved the "Overall Development Plan for Qianhai Shenzhen-Hong Kong Modern Service Industry Cooperation Zone" to solidify ties between Hong Kong and Shenzhen.

=== Tourism ===
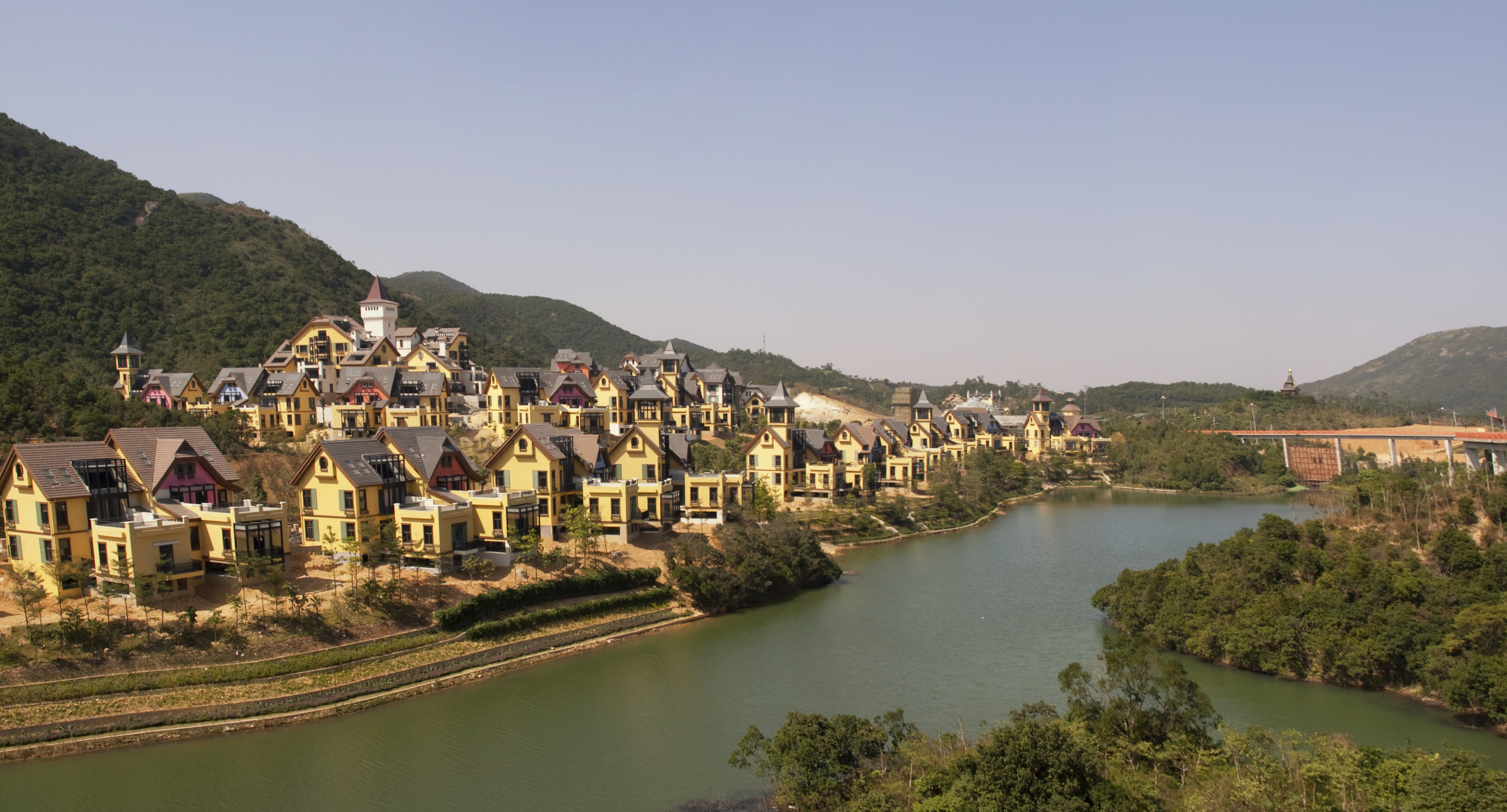
Fairmont Shenzhen Interlaken Hotel at OCT East

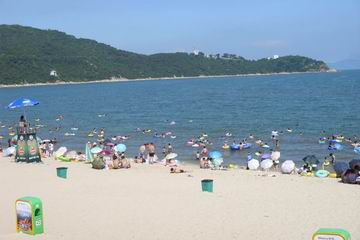
Beach in Shenzhen

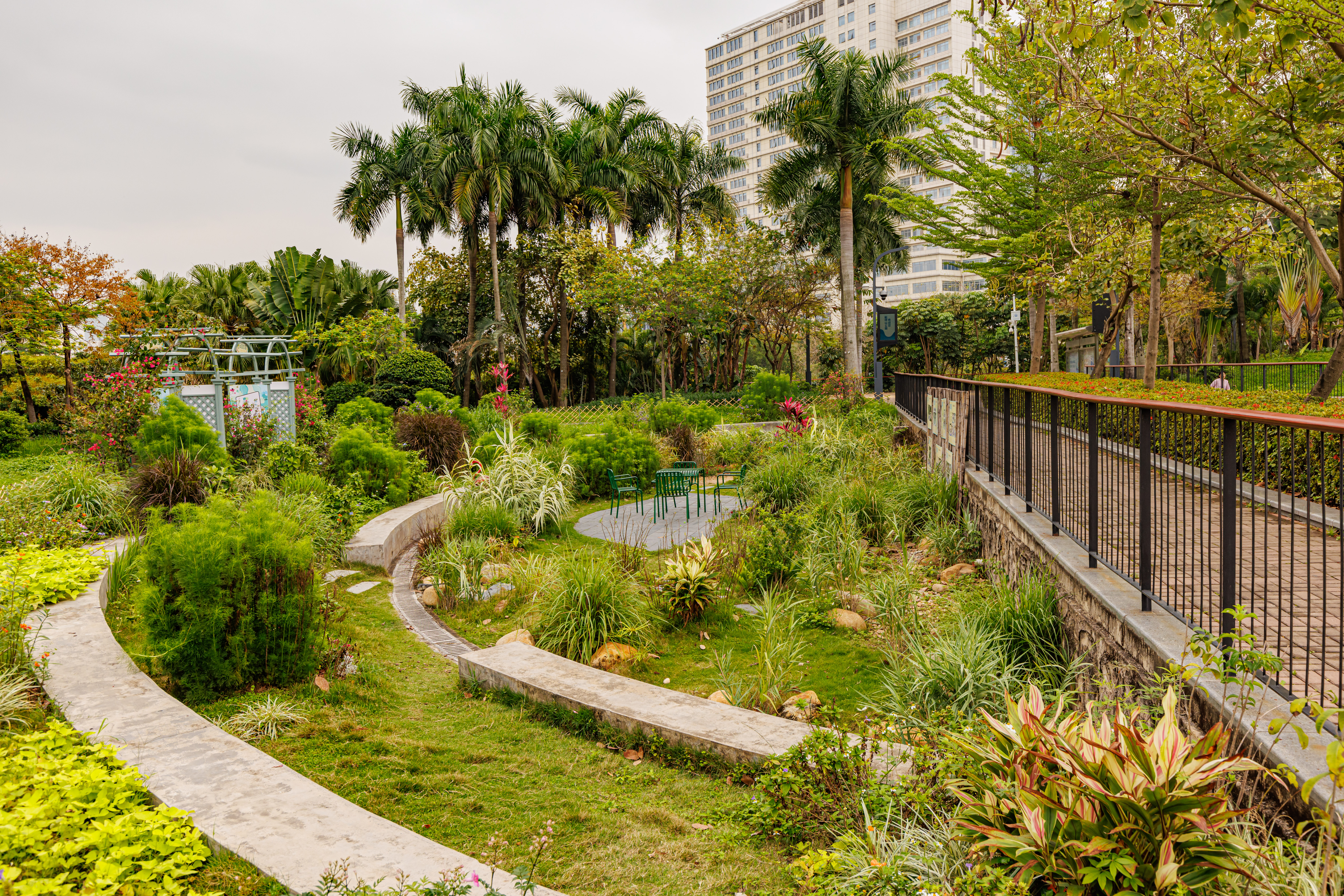
Songpingshan Park

Tourism is gradually growing as an important industry for Shenzhen. Shenzhen has been ranked second on the list of 'top 10 cities to visit in 2019' by Lonely Planet. The Shenzhen administration in its "12th Five-Year Plan for Tourism Development of Shenzhen" had focused on turning the city into an international tourist hub, with emphasis on the city's scientific, fashion, and industrial elements. The Shenzhen tourist industry is claimed by the local administration in having a strong development advantage, due to the city being one of the tier-one cities in China, as well as being known for its coastal resources, climate environment, capitalist economy, and technological innovation.

In 2015 the tourism industry's total revenue was 124.48 billion RMB (US$17.6 billion), a 98.1 percent increase from 2010. Out of the total revenue, 28 percent (35 billion RMB or US$4.968 billion) came from international tourists, an increase of 56.2 percent from 2010. In addition, in that year, Shenzhen received 11.63 million tourists, a 51 percent increase from 2010.

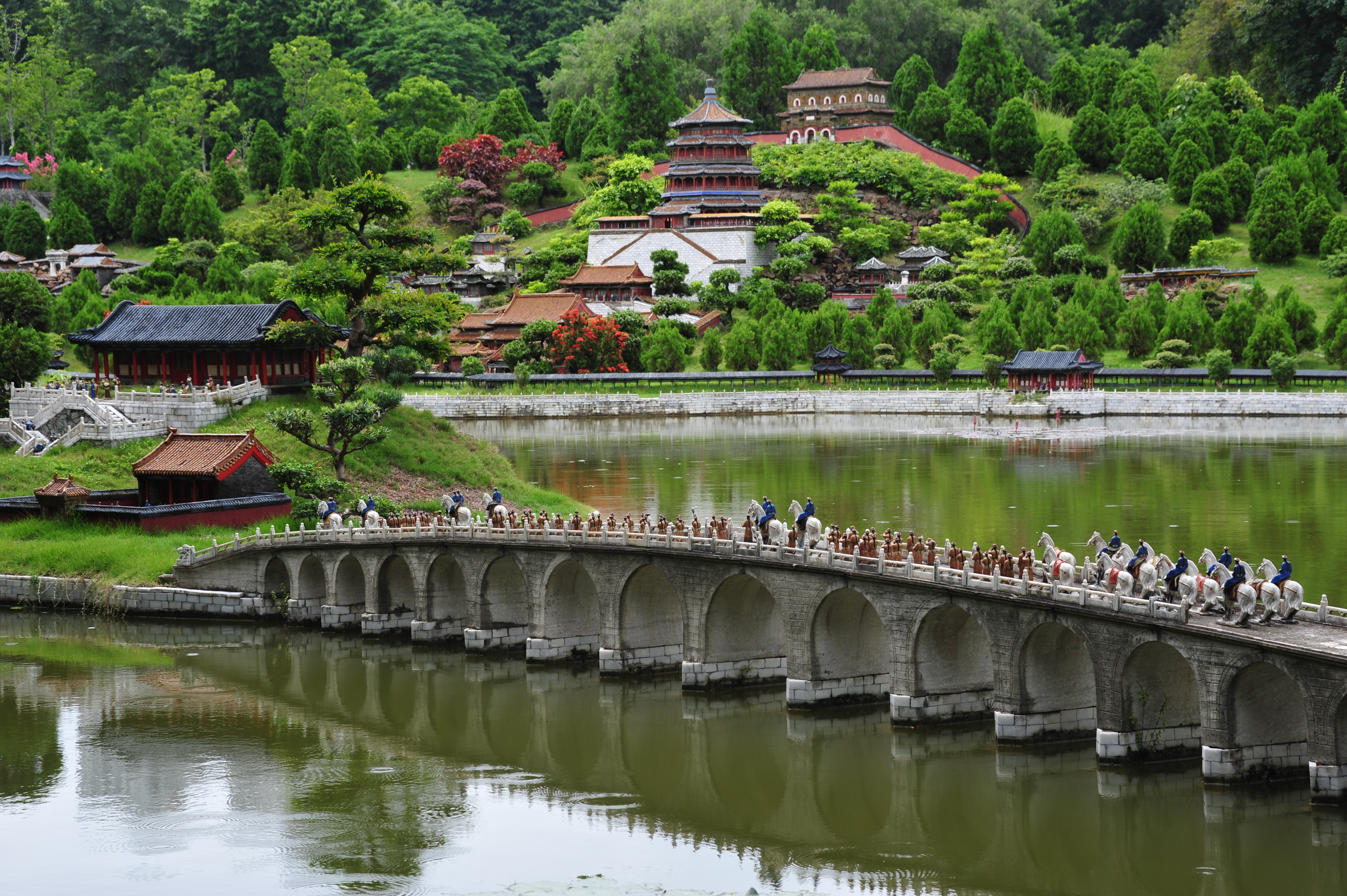
Splendid China

Shenzhen has numerous tourist destinations, ranging from recreational areas such as theme parks and public parks to tall buildings. Most of the tourist attractions are part of Overseas Chinese Town (OCT), a colloquial name for parks owned by OCT Enterprises and is classified as an AAAAA scenic area by the China National Tourism Administration. These include the Window of the World, the Splendid China Folk Village, Happy Valley (欢乐谷), OCT East, and OCT Harbour. Other theme parks include Shekou Sea World (海上世界), Xiaomeisha Sea World, and the now-closed Minsk World. Shenzhen also has a number of popular public parks and beaches, such as People's Park, Lianhuashan Park, Lizhi Park, Zhongshan Park, Wutongshan Park, Dameisha (大梅沙) and Xiaomeisha (小梅沙). The city is also home to tall buildings such as the Ping An Finance Centre, KK100, and the Shun Hing Square (also known as Di Wang Tower).

There are 314 star-rated hotels in Shenzhen as of Q3 2022. International luxury brands including Mandarin Oriental, Park Hyatt, Raffles and Conrad; upper-upscale brands including Sheraton Hotels, Marriott Hotels, and Hilton Hotels. Select-service chains including Holiday Inn, and Courtyard by Marriott all have presence in the city amongst local chains, offering both urban hotels in key business districts and beach resorts in Dameisha, Xiaomeisha and Jinshawan (Golden Bay). Notably, the St. Regis Hotels & Resorts occupies the top portion of the KK100 skyscraper.

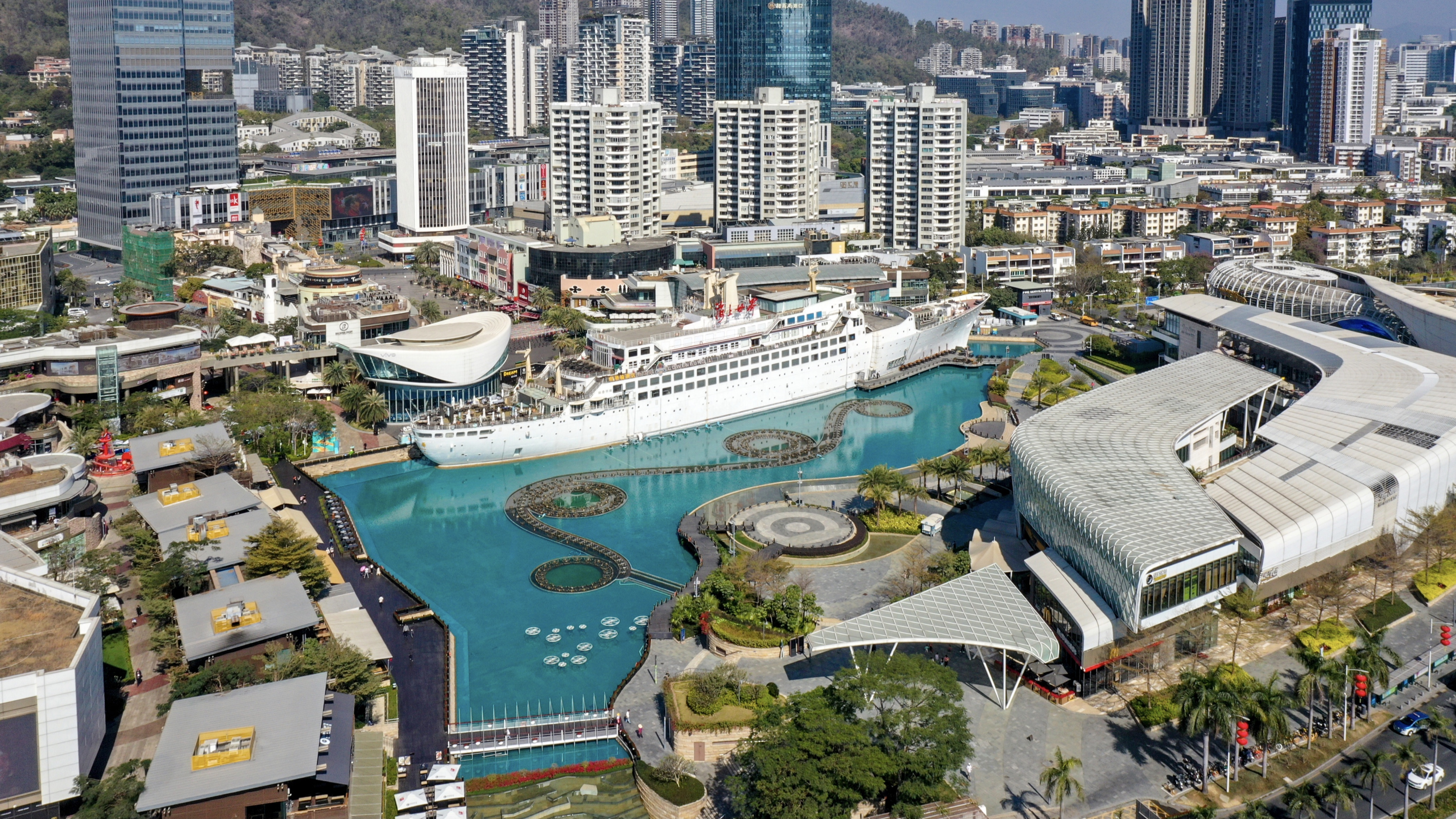
Shekou Sea World

Shenzhen's tourism industry is recently expanding under the "13th Five-Year Plan for Tourism Development of Shenzhen" as promoted under the Shenzhen local government. In this plan, the tourist industry plans to exceed 200 billion RMB and receive 150 million domestic and foreign tourists by 2020. In 2023 an increasing numbers of Hong Kong residents began visiting Shenzhen during weekends, which in turn caused Hong Kong service establishments to face a decline in business.

=== Retail ===
Retail is an important pillar of Shenzhen's tertiary sector. Out of the added value of Shenzhen's tertiary sector of 1.42 trillion RMB (US$201 billion) in 2018, retail contributed 43% (616.89 billion RMB) of this amount, a 7.6 percent increase compared to last year (601.62 billion RMB). In addition, 10.9% of Shenzhen's FDI is directed towards the wholesale and retail sector.

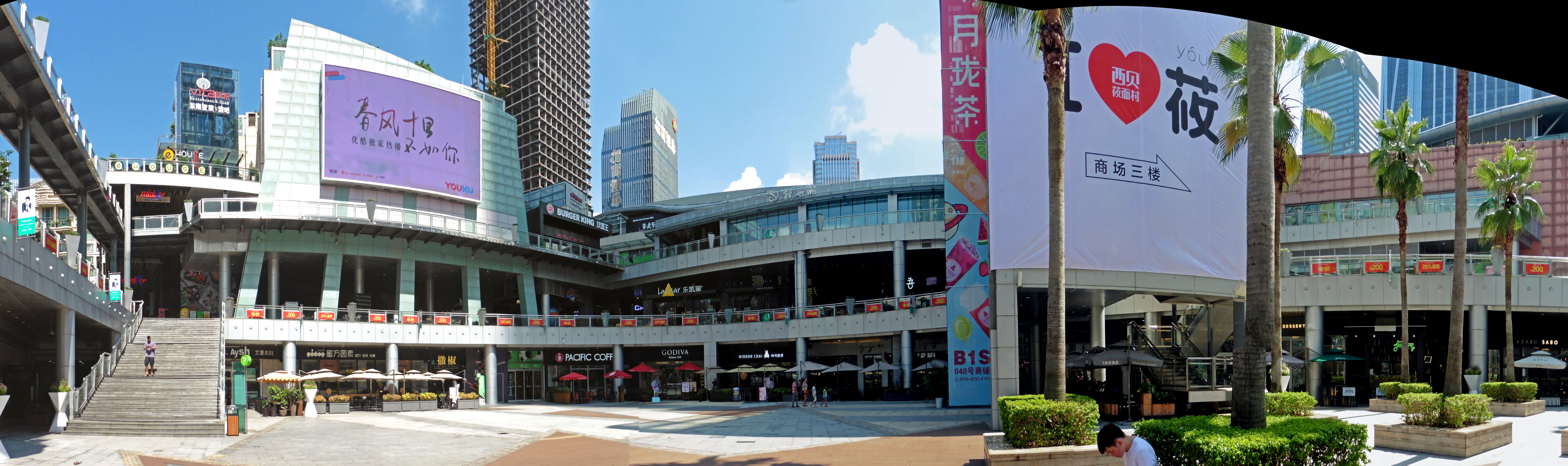
COCO Park

Huaqiang North (华强北) is one of Shenzhen's notable retail areas, being known for having one of the largest electronics markets in the world. Luohu Commercial City, a commercial complex located adjacent to Shenzhen Railway Station, is noted for having a variety of products that ranges from electronics and counterfeit goods to tailored suits and curtains. In addition to Huaqiang North and Luohu Commercial City, Shenzhen has numerous shopping malls and commercial areas, including COCO Park and its branches COCO City and Longgang COCO Park, Uniworld (壹方天地), Uniwalk (壹方场), and Coastal City (海岸城). Shenzhen is also home to drugstore chain China Nepstar.

"Smart retail", which uses technologies such as artificial intelligence and big data in production, circulation, and sales of consumer goods, has been growing popular within enterprises in Shenzhen. Businesses in Shenzhen are encouraged to use the Internet to develop the consumer market, and new retail projects focus on incorporating technology into the business. In addition, the Shenzhen administration is setting up a new retail industry development fund to promote the use of "smart retail," with the intention of stimulating the economy of Shenzhen and to turn the city into a "new retail" hub.

== Demographics ==
Historical populations of Shenzhen in the National Census
Year	Pop.	±% p.a.
1982	351,900	—
1990	1,667,400	+21.47%
2000	7,008,400	+15.44%
2010	10,424,000	+4.05%
2015	11,378,700	+1.77%
2016	11,908,400	+4.66%
2017	12,528,300	+5.21%
2018	13,026,600	+3.98%
2019	13,438,800	+3.16%
2020	17,560,100	+30.67%

As of 2020, Shenzhen had a total permanent population of 17,560,000, with 5,874,000 (33.4 percent) of them hukou holders (registered locally). As Shenzhen is a young city, senior citizens above 60 years old took up only 5.36 percent of the city's total population. Despite this, the life expectancy in Shenzhen is 81.25 in 2018, ranking among the top twenty cities in China. The male to female ratio in Shenzhen is 130 to 100, making the city having the highest sex disparity in comparison to other cities in Guangdong. Shenzhen also has a high birth rate compared to other Chinese cities with 21.7 babies for every 10,000 of its 13.44 million population in 2019. Based on the population of its total administrative area, Shenzhen is the fifth most populous city proper in China. Shenzhen is part of the Pearl River Delta Metropolitan Region (covering cities such as Guangzhou, Dongguan, Foshan, Zhongshan, Zhuhai, Huizhou, Hong Kong, and Macau), the world's largest urban area according to the World Bank, which has a population of 78 million according to the 2020 census.

Before Shenzhen's establishment as a SEZ in 1980, the area was composed mainly of Hakka and Cantonese people. When the SEZ was established, the city attracted migrants from all around Guangdong, including Hakka, Cantonese, and Teochew, as well as migrants from Southern and Central Chinese provinces such as Hunan, Guangxi, Jiangxi, Sichuan, and Henan. Most of these migrants live in urban villages called chengzhongcun (城中村; 'village in the city') such as Baishizhou in the Nanshan District. Shenzhen also has a notable Korean minority based in the Nanshan District and the Futian District originating from migrants moving to Shenzhen to work for South Korean companies that had branched out into the city when China had started reform and opening up.

Due to Shenzhen's population overshooting the 14.8 million population target for 2016 to 2020, the Shenzhen justice bureau on 25 May 2021 announced it would make it harder to earn a hukou to live in the city. In regard to the registered population (hukou), Shenzhen experienced an increase of 2.178 million (58.9 percent) registered residents in the city from 2015 to 2020. The city's permanent population increased by 7,136,088 (68.46 percent) from 2010 to 2020, for an average annual growth rate of 5.35%.

=== Religion ===
According to the Department of Religious Affairs of the Shenzhen Municipal People's Government, the two main religions present in Shenzhen are Buddhism and Taoism. Every district also has Protestant and Catholic churches, as well as mosques. Shenzhen also hosts the headquarters of the Holy Confucian Church, established in 2009.

=== Languages ===
Prior to the establishment of Special Economic Zone, the indigenous local communities could be divided into Cantonese and Hakka speakers, which were two cultural and linguistic sub-ethnic groups vernacular to Guangdong province. Two Cantonese varieties were spoken locally. One was a fairly standard version, known as standard Cantonese. The other, spoken by several villages south of Fuhua Road, was called Weitou dialect. Two or three Hong Kong villages south of the Shenzhen River also speak this dialect. This is consistent with the area settled by people who accompanied the Southern Song court to the south in the late 13th century.

The influx of migrants from other parts of the country has drastically altered the city's linguistic landscape, as Shenzhen has undergone a language shift towards Mandarin, which was both promoted by the Chinese Central Government as a national lingua franca and natively spoken by most of the out-of-province immigrants and their descendants. However, in recent years multilingualism has been on the rise as descendants of immigrants of out-of-province Mandarin native speakers have begun to assimilate into the local culture through friends, television and other media. Despite the ubiquity of Mandarin Chinese, according to the SCMP, some Shenzhen residents, Cantonese and non-Cantonese alike, have attempted to revive the Cantonese language as part of Shenzhen's culture.

== Cityscape ==
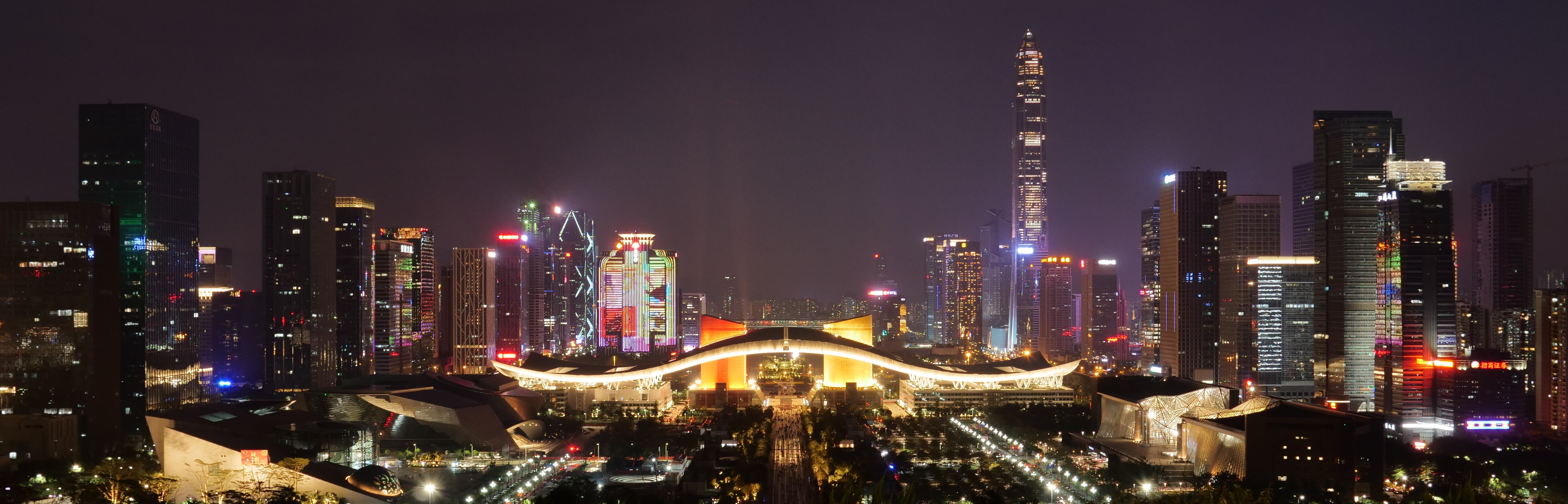
Nighttime panoramic view of the Shenzhen Civic Center, with the Ping An Finance Centre towards the right. Located in the Central District, the civic center building was designed by Lee | Timchula Architects and was the main focal point of the urban plan.

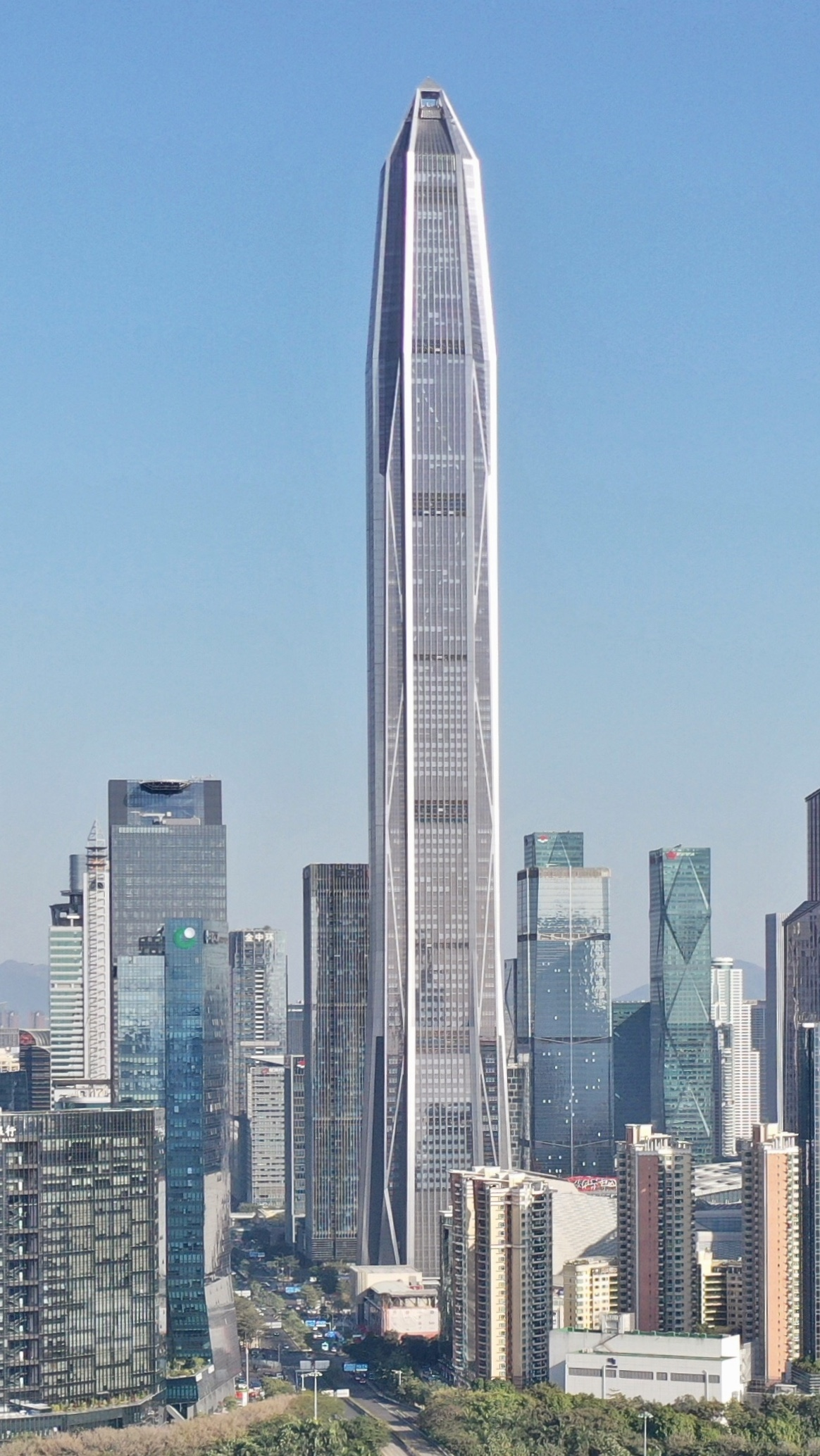
Ping An Finance Centre, 2nd tallest building in China and the 5th tallest in the world

In 2019, Shenzhen has been dubbed by The Guardian as "the world leader completing new skyscrapers." The city is ranked the second in the world in terms of the number of buildings above 150 meters, with 297 of them completed as of July 2021, after neighboring Hong Kong. There were more skyscrapers completed in Shenzhen in the year 2016 than in the whole of the US and Australia combined. The construction boom continues today with over 85 skyscrapers under construction across the city as of 2021, the most in the world. Most of the skyscrapers in Shenzhen were built by either Hong Kong or foreign-based architects, utilizing a modern style, though functionalism was a dominant form of architecture in the city's skyscrapers in the late 20th century. Among the most prominent examples are the 160 metres (525 ft) high Guomao Building, the 384 metres (1,260 ft) high Shun Hing Square, the 441.8 metres (1,449 ft) high KK100, the 392 metres (1,286 ft) high China Resources Headquarters, and the 599 metres (1,965 ft) high Ping An Finance Centre, which is also the second tallest in China and the fifth tallest building in the world. Built in 2015, the skyscraper is to be unique and elegant among its surroundings to represent the history and achievements of the main tenant: Ping An Insurance.

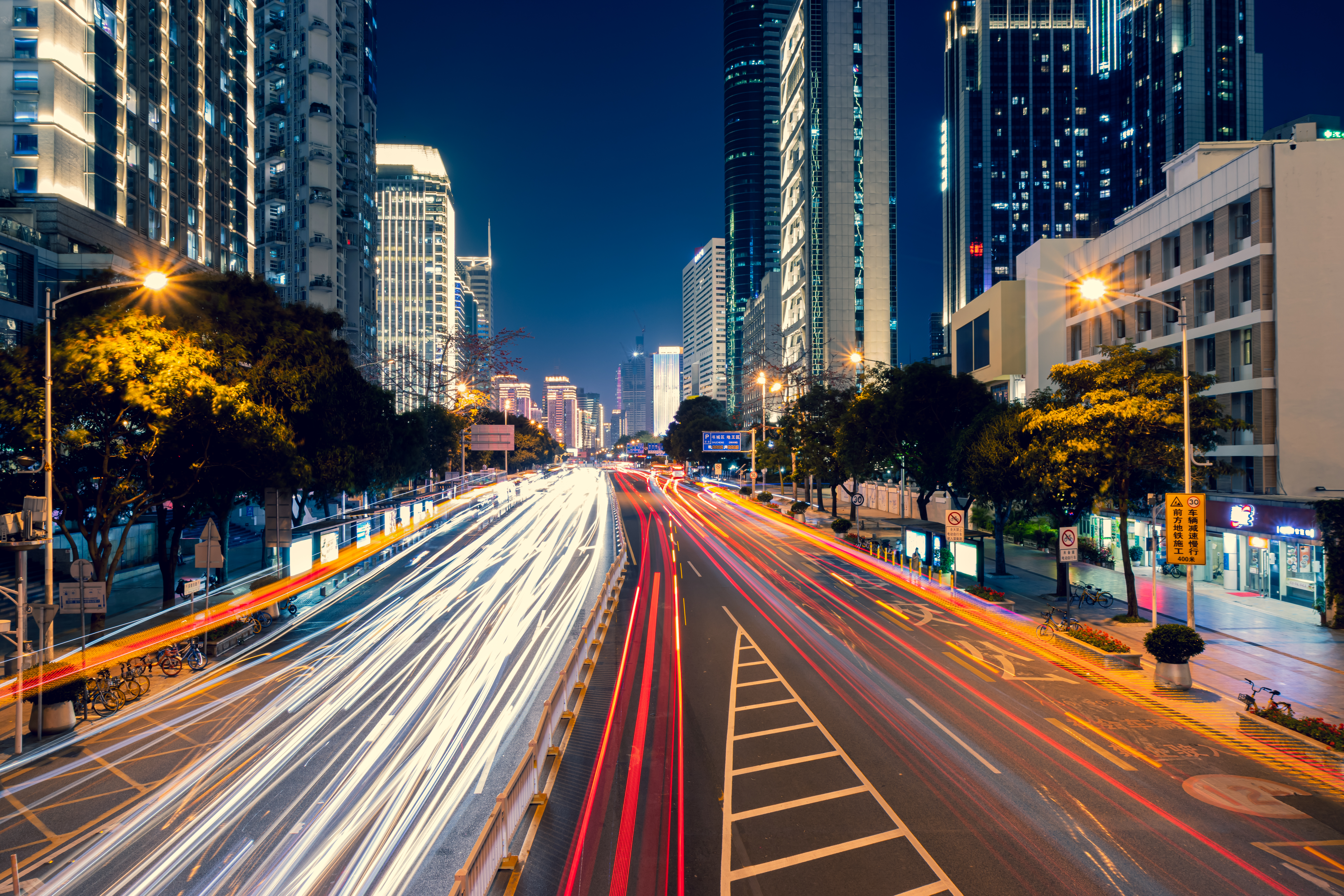
Shennan East Road at night

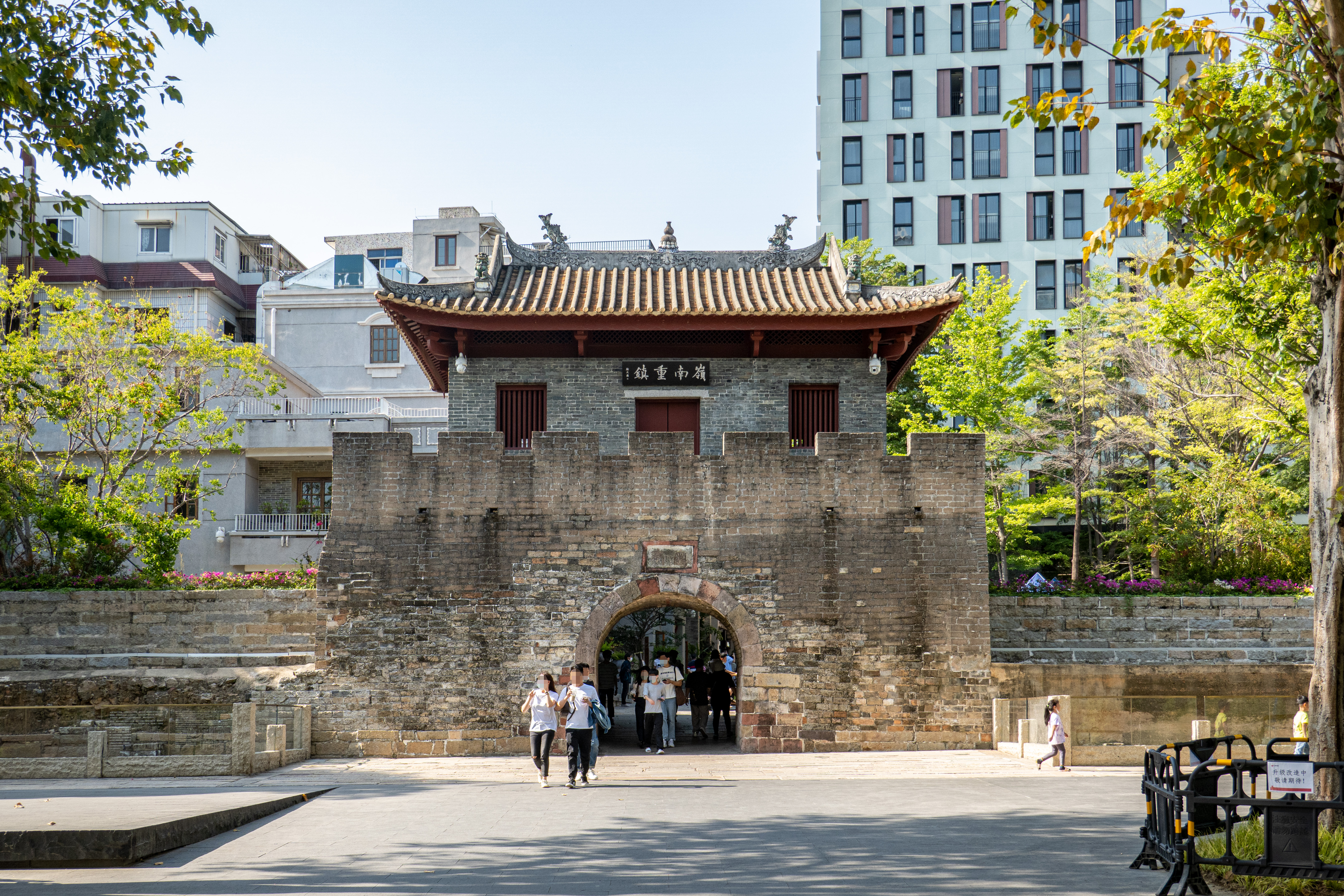
Ancient town of Nantou

Shenzhen also has several historical buildings based in traditional Chinese architecture. There are Hakka walled villages located in the city such as Crane Lake and Gangeng in the Longgang District. Like typical Hakka walled villages, the architecture of Crane Lake and Gangeng are based around large thick grey walls, narrow alleyways, and courtyards. Nantou (or Xin'an) is a historic town located in the present-day Nanshan District and has some buildings that date back to the Ming dynasty such as the Guandi Temple, though most of these traditional buildings have been replaced by modern ones. Chiwan, located in the Nanshan District, also has several historical buildings, such as the tomb to the last emperor of the Southern Song, Zhao Bing and Tianhou Temple which was built by Zheng He as an offering to Mazu to protect the Ming treasure fleet. There are also several historical forts that had defended the coastline located within the city, such as Dapeng Fortress and Chiwan Left Fort.

In 2023, the Marisfrolg Pavilion, featuring an insect exoskeleton design, was completed and became a new landmark in Longhua District.

== Education and research ==
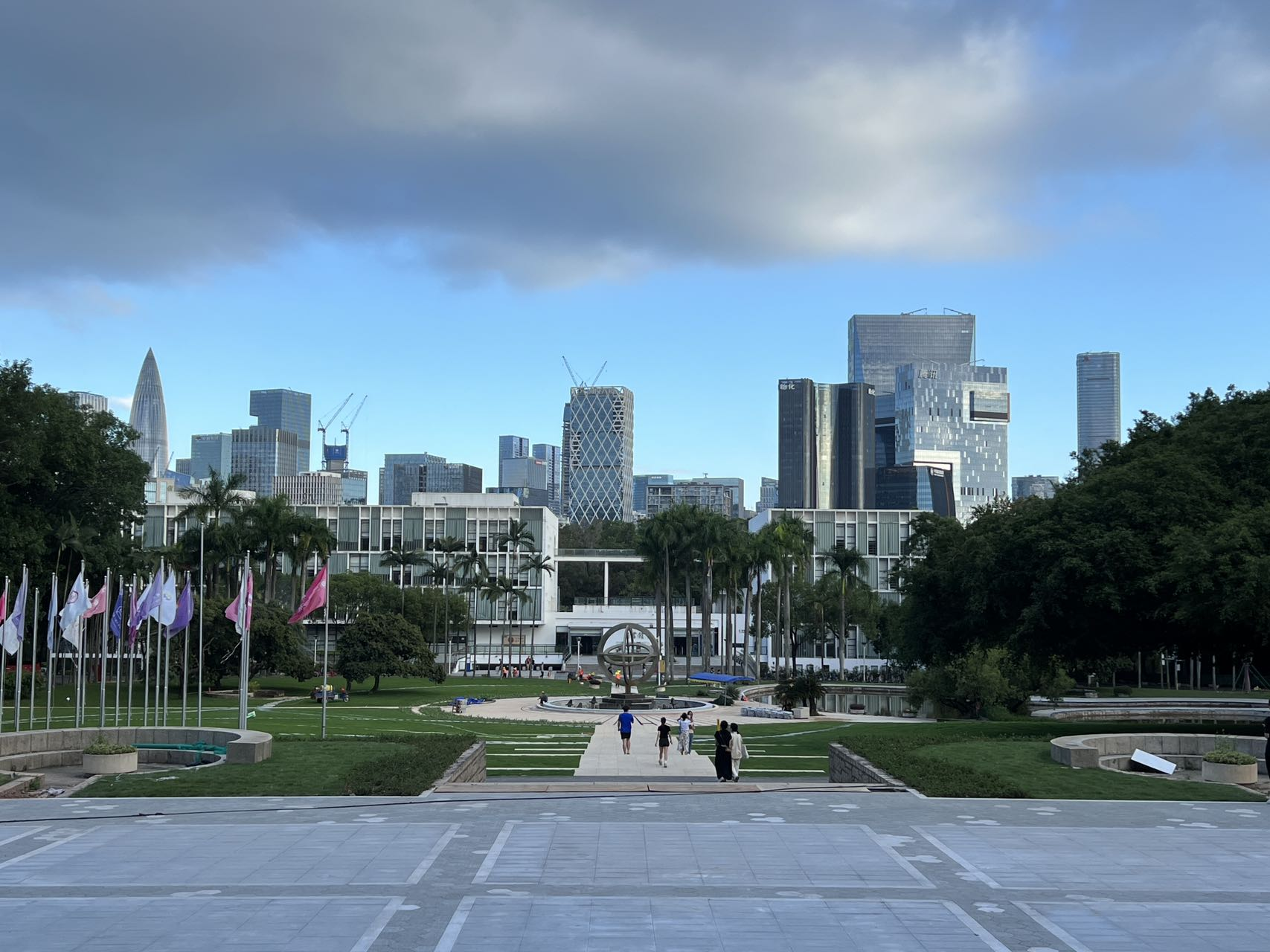
Shenzhen University

Before the 1980s, Shenzhen's education system was based on primary and limited secondary schooling. No residents were admitted to a university. Since Shenzhen's establishment as a SEZ in the 1980s, migrants poured into the city, and jobs requiring a university education grew.

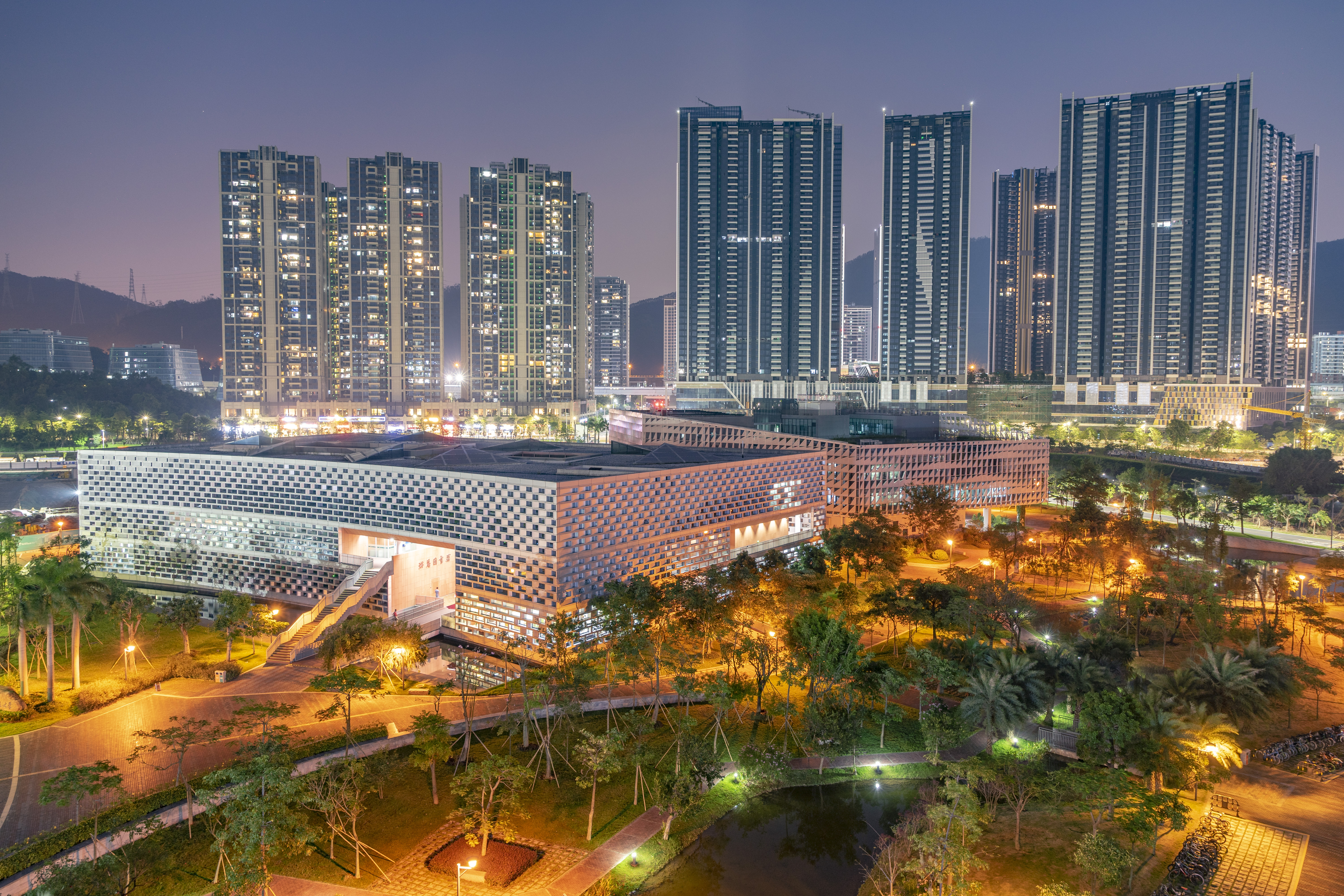
Southern University of Science and Technology

In the mid-1980s, as upper secondary education became popular, there was a need for higher education institutions in the city. Opened in 1983, Shenzhen Normal School, later upgraded to Shenzhen Normal College, trained students to become primary school teachers. Approved by the State Council in the same year, Shenzhen University became Shenzhen's first comprehensive full-time higher educational institution. In 1999, the Shenzhen Municipal Government set up the Shenzhen Virtual University Park in the Science and Technology Park, where teachers from China's top universities taught graduate students. In 2011, the Southern University of Science and Technology was established followed in 2018 by the Shenzhen Technology University. Other universities have established campuses in the city, including Tsinghua University, Peking University, the Chinese University of Hong Kong, the Harbin Institute of Technology, and Moscow State University.

As of 2025, Shenzhen also has the 18th largest scientific research output of any city in the world.

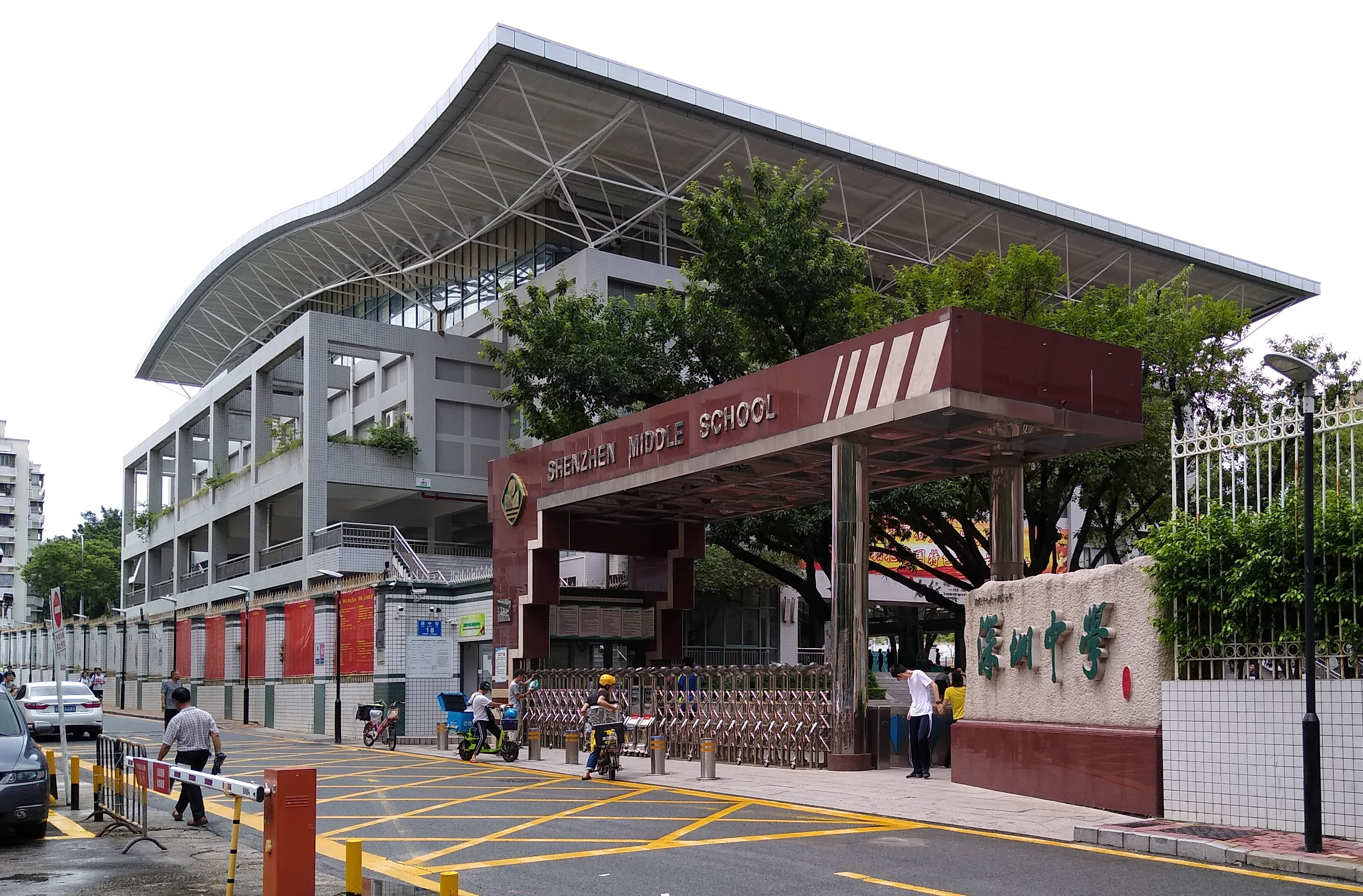
Shenzhen Middle School

Quality primary education in Shenzhen depends on parent's ability to get their kids hukou. In Shenzhen, this depends on the birth, education and marriage of the parents. In 2020, 33% of Shenzhen residents had hukou. The nine-year compulsory education in Shenzhen is free. For secondary education, parents try to get their children into Shenzhen's four famous schools: Shenzhen Middle School, Shenzhen Experimental School, Shenzhen Foreign Languages School, and Shenzhen High School. These schools have an approximately 10% admission rate for hukou students and 2% for students applying without hukou.

As of 2024, Shenzhen has 14 higher educational institutions, 554 general secondary schools, 359 primary schools, and 1,973 preschools. According to Laurie Chen of the South China Morning Post, Shenzhen, which had 15 million people as of 2019, had not built as many primary and secondary schools for its populace as it should have, compared to similarly developed cities in China. Laurie Chen cited the acceptance rate of Shenzhen secondary schools in 2018: 35,000 slots were available for almost 80,000 applicants. She also cited how Guangzhou had 961 primary schools while Shenzhen had only 344 primary schools, as well as how Guangzhou's count of primary school teachers exceeded that of Shenzhen's by 17,000; Chen argued that Guangzhou and Shenzhen have similar populations. In response Shenzhen schools began increasing salaries for prospective teachers.

== Transport ==
Shenzhen is the second largest transportation hub in Guangdong and South China, trailing behind the provincial capital of Guangzhou. Shenzhen has a developed extensive public transportation system, covering rapid transit, buses and taxis, most of which can be accessed by either using a Shenzhen Tong card or using QR codes generated by WeChat mini programs. Shenzhen is noted for being the first major city worldwide to only use electric buses and taxis. As of 2023, 70% of cars in Shenzhen were electric vehicles.

=== Air ===
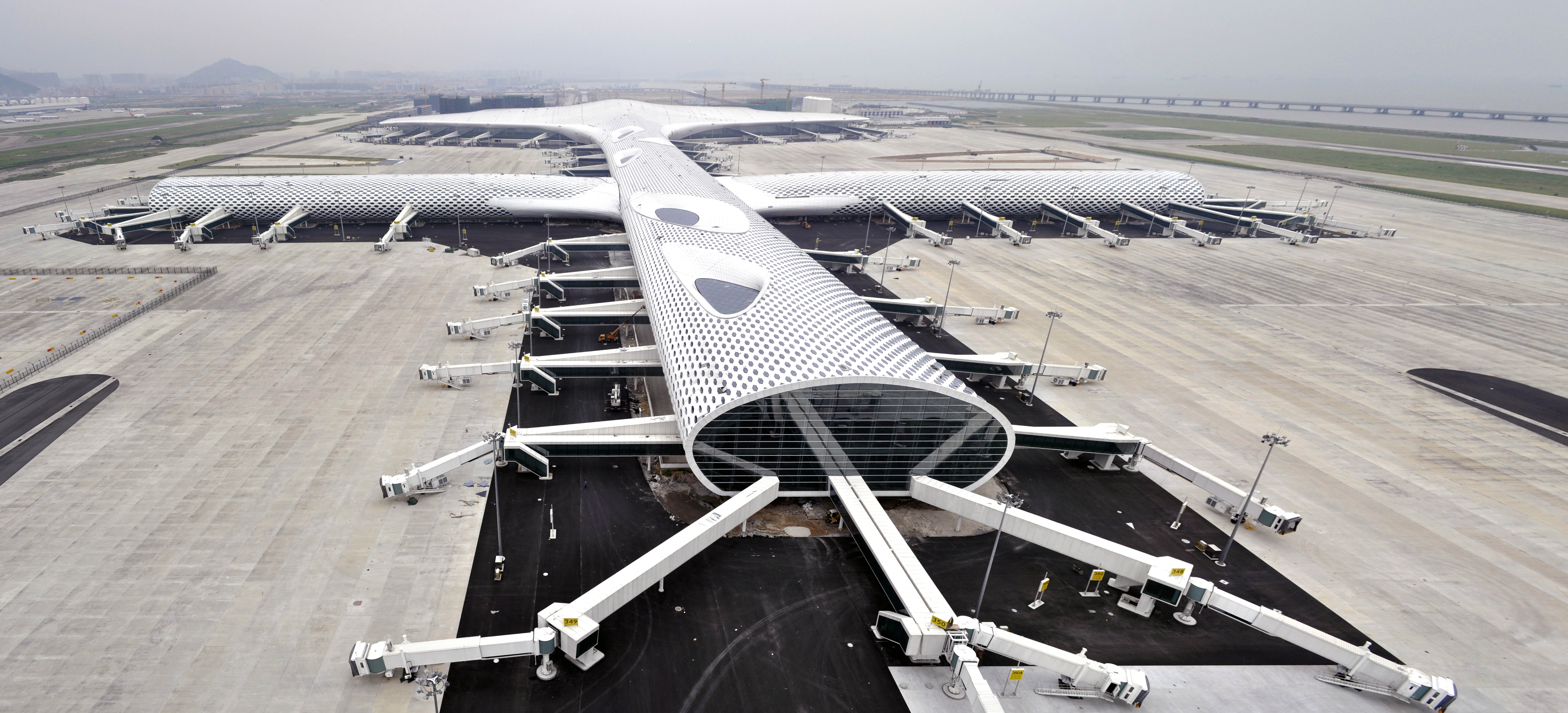
Shenzhen Bao'an International Airport Terminal 3

Regarding air transport, Shenzhen is served by its own Shenzhen Bao'an International Airport and the neighboring Hong Kong International Airport (HKIA). Located 35 kilometres (22 miles) from the center of the city, Shenzhen Bao'an International Airport serves as the main hub for passenger airlines Shenzhen Airlines and Donghai Airlines and a main hub for cargo airlines Jade Cargo International, SF Airlines, and UPS Airlines. Together, Shenzhen Bao'an International Airport handled 49,348,950 passengers, 355,907 aircraft, and 1,218,502.2 cargo in 2018, making it the 5th busiest airport in China in terms of passenger traffic and the 4th busiest airport in the country in terms of aircraft and cargo traffic. In addition to flying through Bao'an International Airport, ticketed passengers can also take ferries from the Shekou Cruise Centre and the Fuyong Ferry Terminal to the Skypier at Hong Kong International Airport. There are also coach bus services connecting Shenzhen with HKIA.

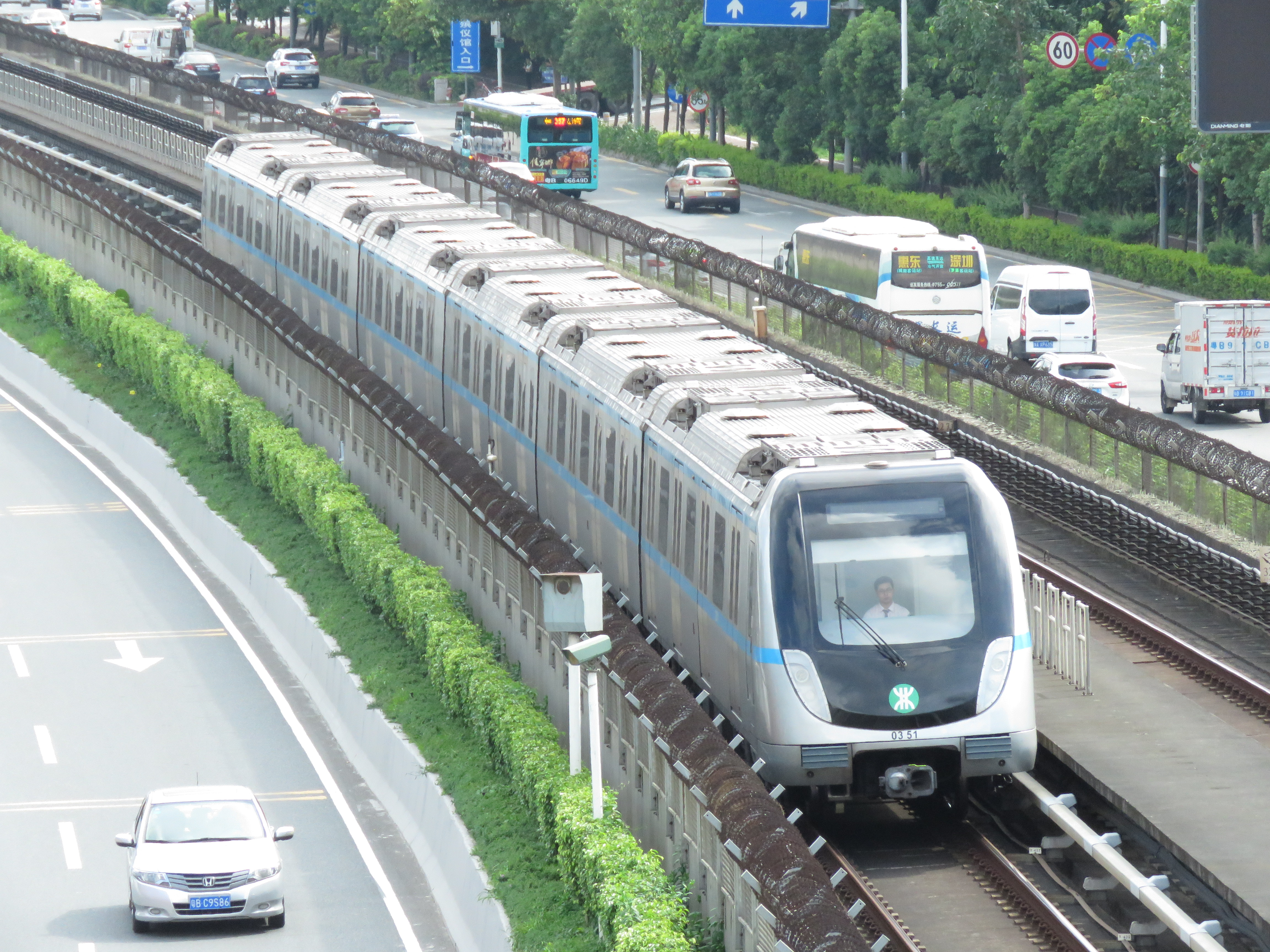
The Shenzhen Metro is the sixth rapid transit system in mainland China and second such system in Guangdong.

=== Metro ===
The Shenzhen Metro serves as the city's rapid transit system. The system in 2022 reaches 419 kilometres (260 miles) of route operating on 12 lines with 290 stations. By 2030 the network is planned to be 8 express and 24 non-express lines totalling 1142 kilometres of trackage. The average daily metro ridership in 2021 is 5.99 million passengers. The metro also operates a tram system in the Longhua District.

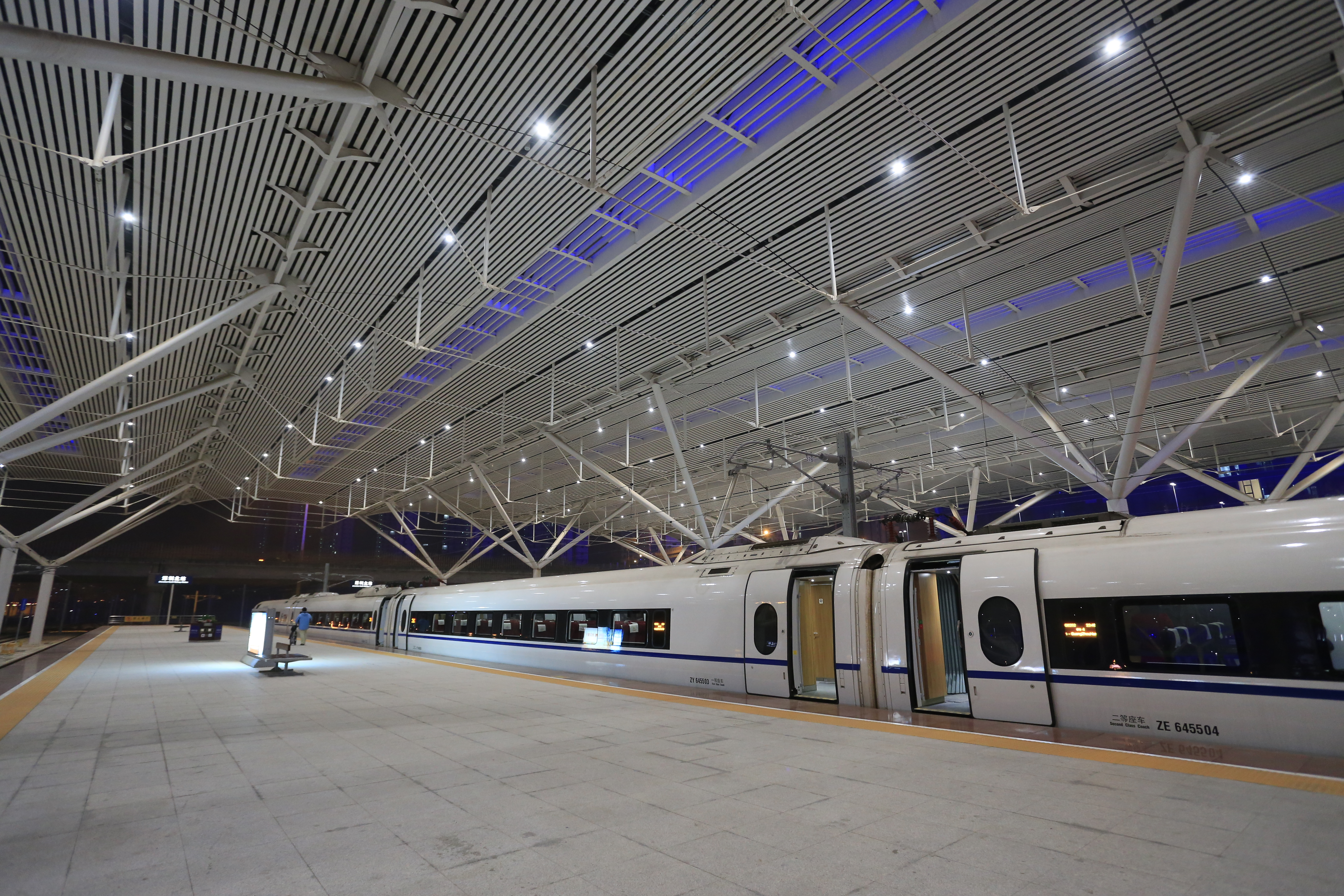
Shenzhen North railway station platform

Shenzhen is served by seven inter-city railway stations: Futian, Guangmingcheng, Pingshan, Shenzhen (also known as Luohu Railway Station) Shenzhen East, Shenzhen North, and Shenzhen West. High-speed rail (HSR) lines that go through the city are the Guangzhou–Shenzhen–Hong Kong Express Rail Link, the Beijing–Guangzhou high-speed railway, and the Xiamen–Shenzhen railway (forms part of the Hangzhou–Fuzhou–Shenzhen passenger railway). Non-HSR lines that go through Shenzhen are the Guangzhou-Shenzhen Railway (forms part of the Kowloon–Canton railway) and the Beijing-Kowloon Railway.

=== Road ===
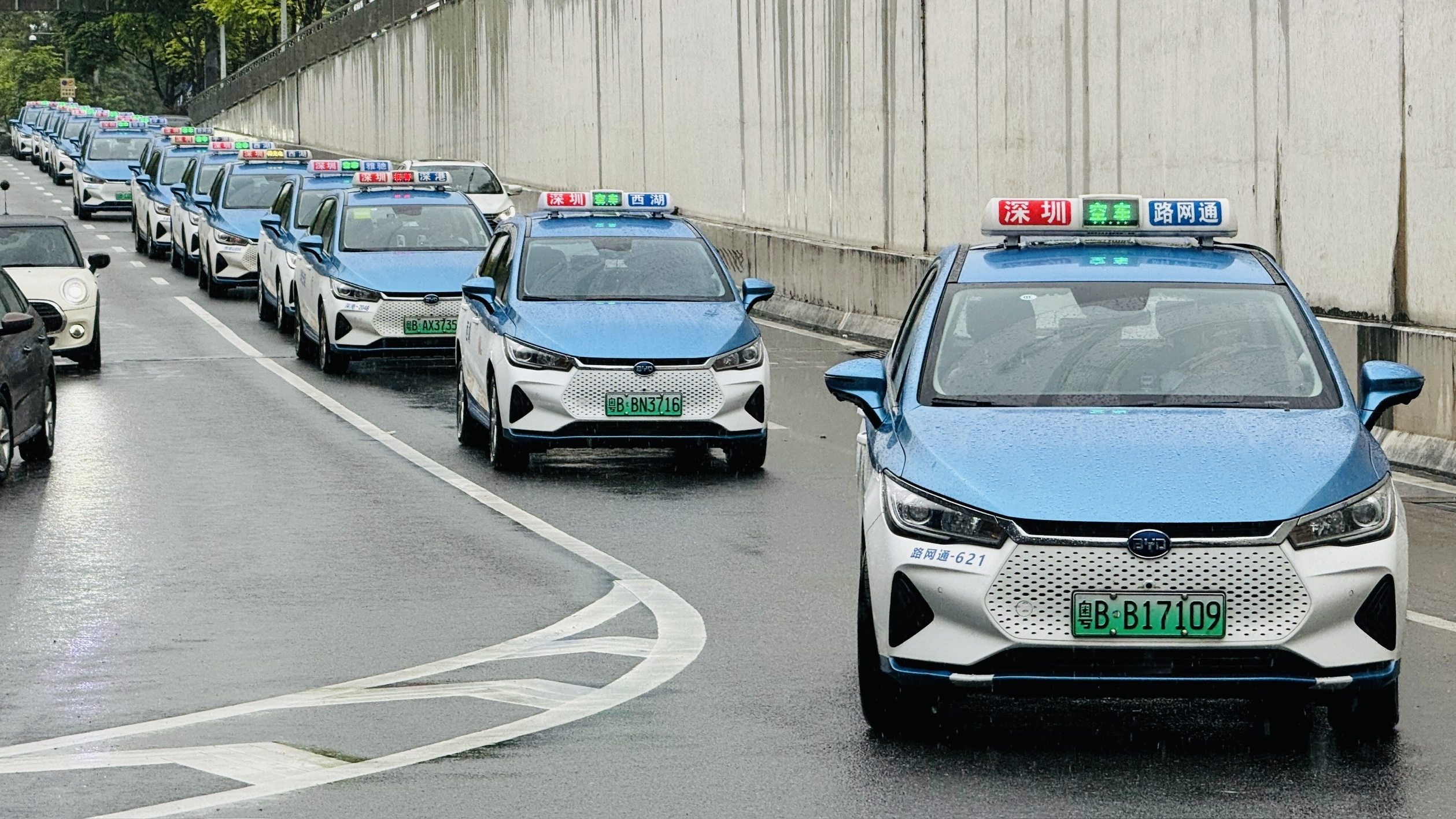
Taxis in Shenzhen

As of August 2019, the city's bus system encompasses over 900 lines, with a total of over 16,000 electric vehicles, the largest of its kind in the world. The system is operated by multiple companies. As at January 2019 conversion of Shenzhen's taxi fleet to electric vehicles reached 99%. Electric taxis have a blue and white colour scheme. Petroleum fuelled taxis are coloured either green or red.

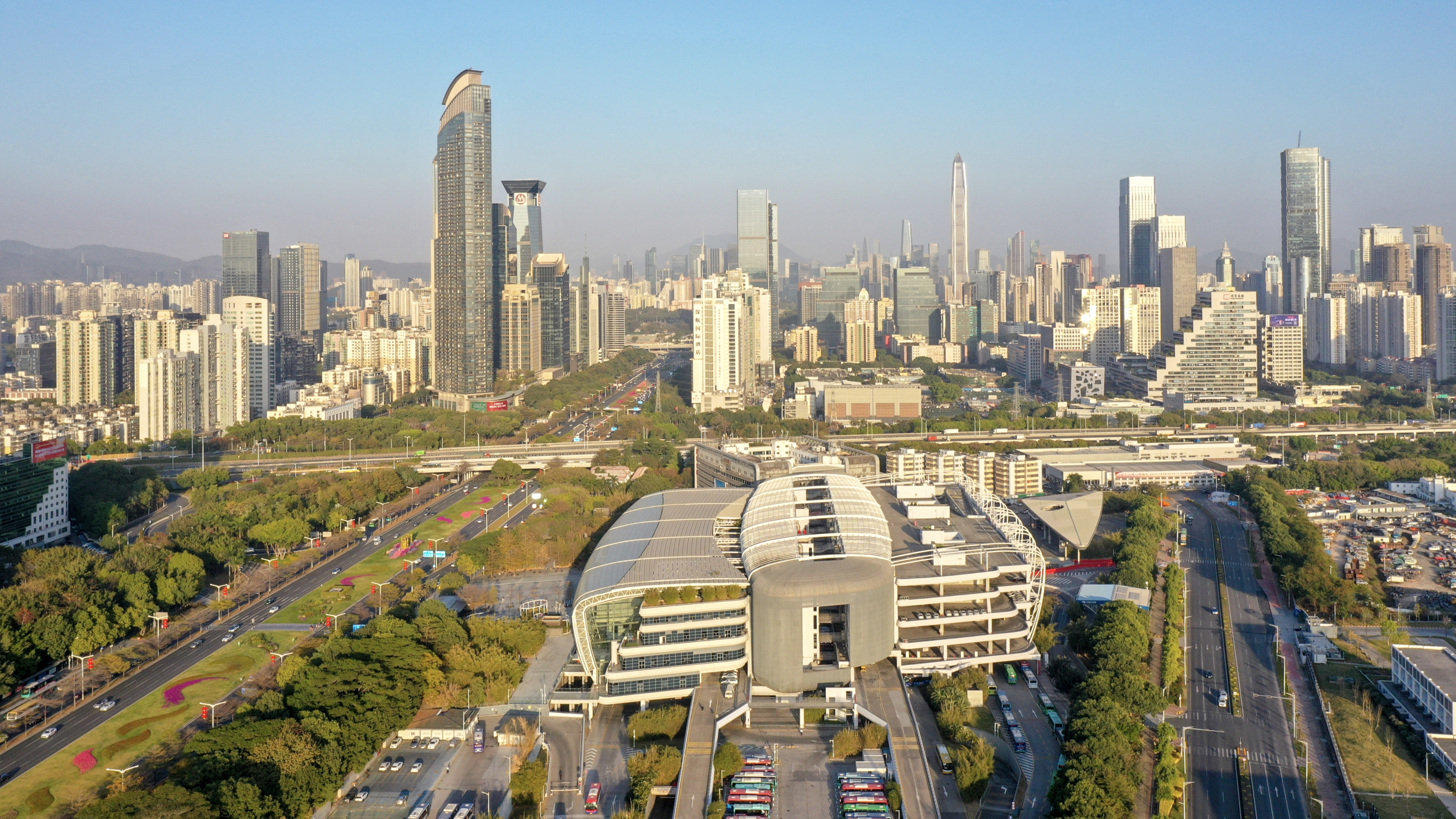
G4 Beijing–Hong Kong and Macau Expressway (lateral) and Shennan Road (straight)

Shenzhen serves as a fabric to China's expressway system. Expressways within the city include the Meiguan Expressway (part of the G94 Pearl River Delta Ring Expressway), the Jihe Expressway (part of the G15 Shenhai Expressway), the Yanba Expressway (part of the S30 Huishen Coastal Expressway), the S28 Shuiguan Expressway, the Yanpai Expressway (part of the G25 Changshen Expressway and the S27 Renshen Expressway), and the S33 Nanguang Expressway. In response to being rejected from being a part of the Hong Kong–Zhuhai–Macau Bridge, Shenzhen is constructing a bridge across the Pearl River Delta to connect the city of Zhongshan.

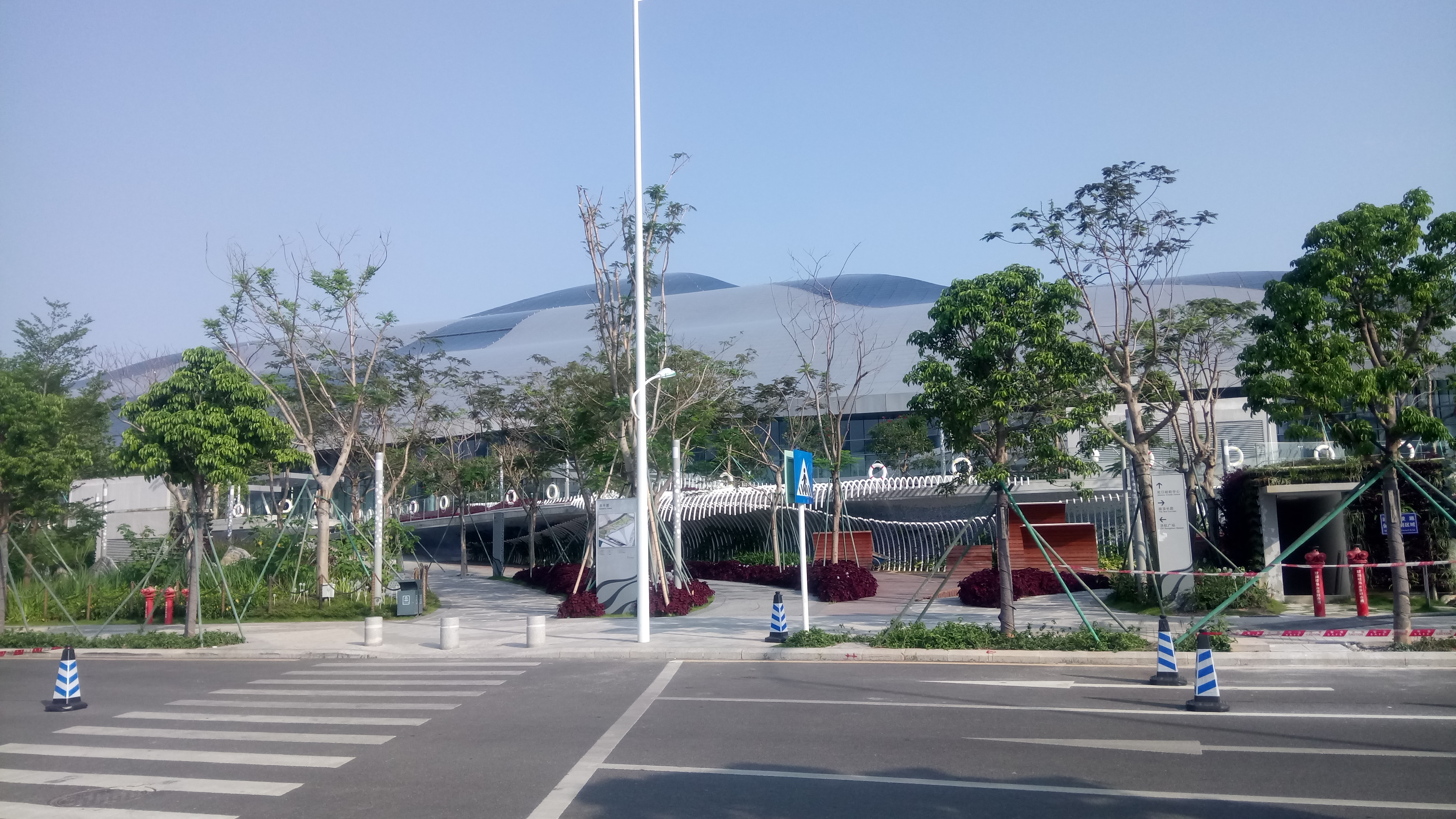
Shekou Cruise Center

Shenzhen is connected with Hong Kong (city and airport), Zhuhai and Macau through ferries that leave from and arrive at the Shekou Cruise Center. The Fuyong Passenger Terminal in the Bao'an District provide services to and from Hong Kong (Hong Kong International Airport) and Macau (Taipa Temporary Ferry Terminal and Outer Harbour Ferry Terminal). The Port of Shenzhen is the third busiest container port in the world, handling 27.7 million TEUs in 2018.

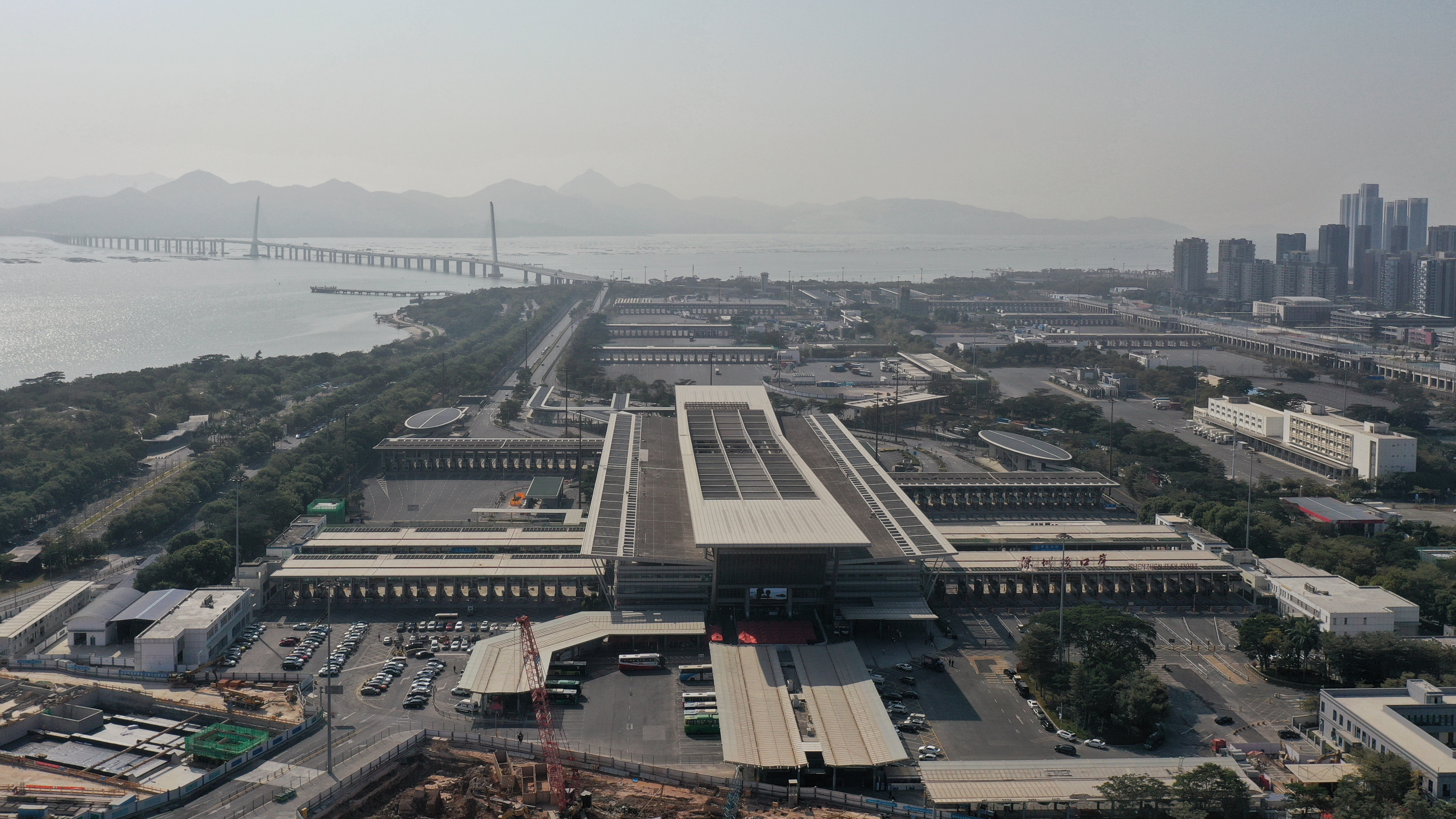
Shenzhen Bay Port

Due to its proximity to Hong Kong, Shenzhen has the largest number of entry and exit ports, the largest number of entry and exit personnel, and the largest traffic volume in China. Shenzhen is busiest in China when it comes to border crossings, with people entering and exiting the country through the city and Hong Kong reaching 239 million in 2015. In the same year, a total of 15.5 million vehicles crossed the border in Shenzhen, a 0.4% increase of last year. Border crossing ports include the Shenzhen Bay Port, Futian Port, Huanggang Port, Man Kam To Port, and Luohu Port.

Multiple ports on the part of the coastline of Shenzhen constitute the Shenzhen Port. In 2019, Shenzhen had 211 international container routes, and the container throughput of the entire Shenzhen port reached nearly 25.77 million boxes in 2019, ranking fourth in the world. Yantian Port is the busiest port among Shenzhen ports and the main foreign trade channel in South China in the mid-term.

== Culture ==
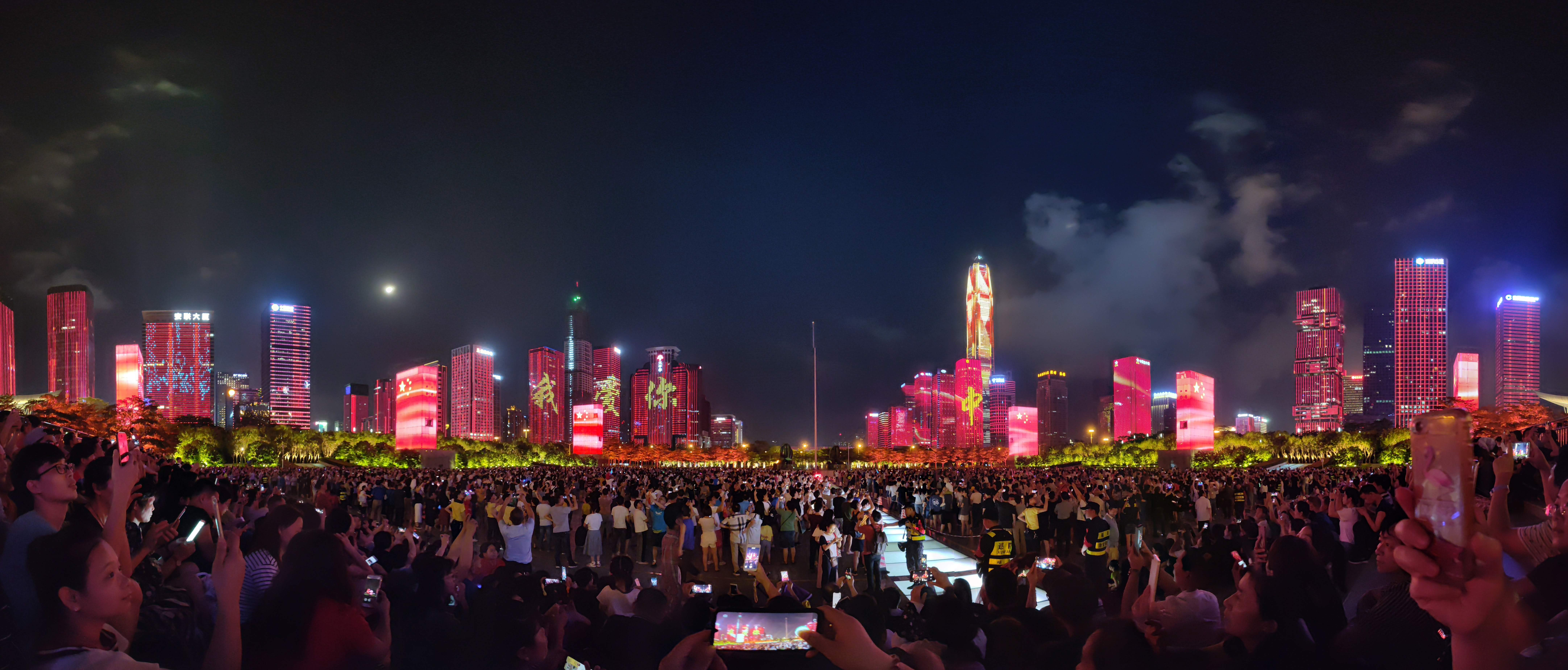
A light show in the Futian District, May 2019

As Shenzhen is located in Guangdong, the city historically had a Cantonese culture before its transition to a SEZ. The competitive culture that the city promotes among the youth have also used the term "Shenzhen speed", which resulted from the fast construction of the tallest building in Shenzhen. The term also describes a period of constant competition, quick changes, and high-efficiency.

In 2003 the municipal government announced plans to turned Shenzhen into a cultural city by promoting design, animation, and library construction. The municipal government also intends to develop the city's cultural industry in accordance to the 13th Five-Year Plan, establishing the Shenzhen Fashion Creative Industry Association and the 4.6-square-kilometre (1.8 sq mi) Dalang Fashion Valley.

Shenzhen's cultural industry specializes in being one of the largest handicraft manufacturers in China, and is also an industry center for oil painting in bases such as Dafen Village. Shenzhen also hosts the Shenzhen International Cultural Fair which specializes as an expo for the world's cultural industries, with the first expo being in November 2004. As a result of these developments, Shenzhen was awarded by UNESCO the title of "United Nations Design Capital" and was accepted entry into the Creative Cities Network on 7 December 2008.

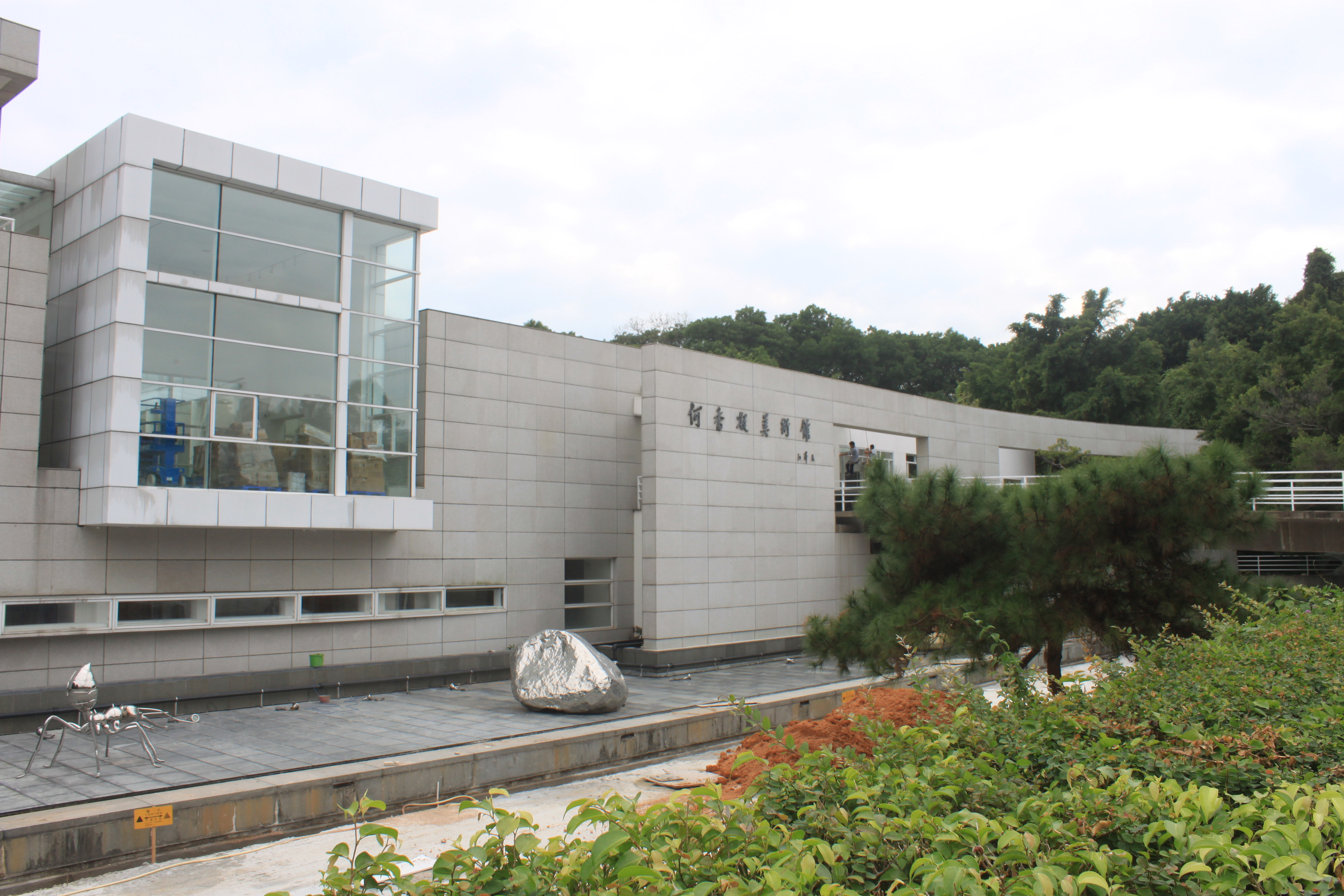
He Xiangning Art Museum

As part of turning Shenzhen into a cultural city, the municipal government established the "Library City" (图书馆之城) concept in 2003. The plan would create a library network within the city through library construction, service improvement, and create a comfortable reading environment. By the end of 2015, Shenzhen has 620 public libraries, including 3 city-level public libraries, 8 district-level public libraries, and 609 grassroots libraries. Notable libraries include the Shenzhen Library and the Shenzhen Children's Library. Shenzhen also has bookstores, with the most notable being Shenzhen Book City in the Futian District. With an operating area of 42,000 square metres (450,000 ft^{2}), it claimed to be the largest bookstore of Asia at the time of its opening. Shenzhen has a number of museums and art galleries, such as the Shenzhen Museum, the Shenzhen Art Museum, the Shekou Maritime Museum, the Longgang Museum of Hakka Culture, Shenzhen Museum of Contemporary Art and Urban Planning, and the He Xiangning Art Museum. Shenzhen also has a few theaters, notably the Shenzhen Concert Hall, the Shenzhen Grand Theater, and the Shenzhen Poly Theater.

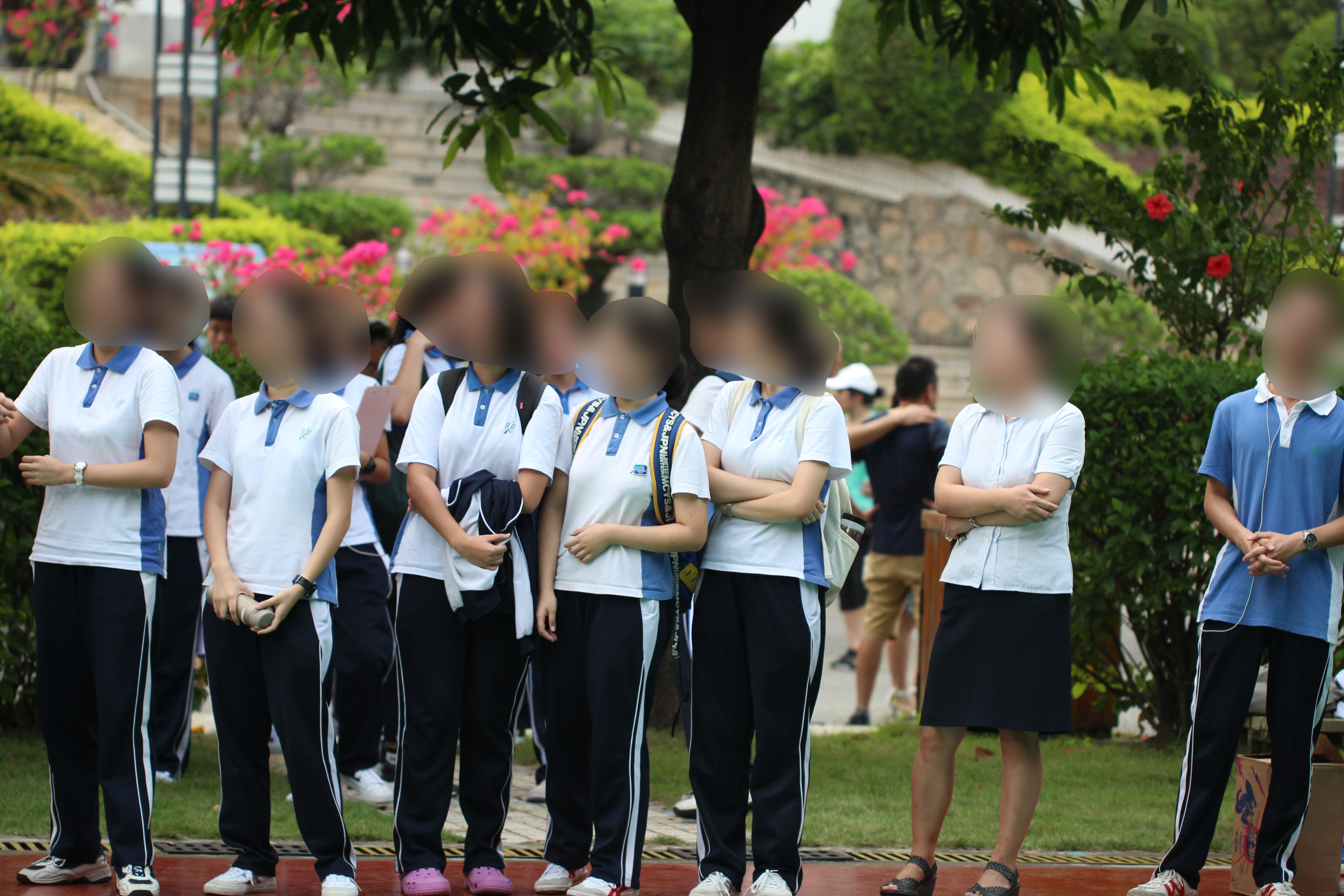
Shenzhen Middle Schools Summer Uniform

Shenzhen has a citywide standardized school uniform for primary and secondary schools. The uniforms feature a blue and white color scheme, with the colors reversed for boys and girls. This well-known uniform set is a representative of Chinese student uniforms. It is often worn by internet celebrities and anime characters.

== Food ==
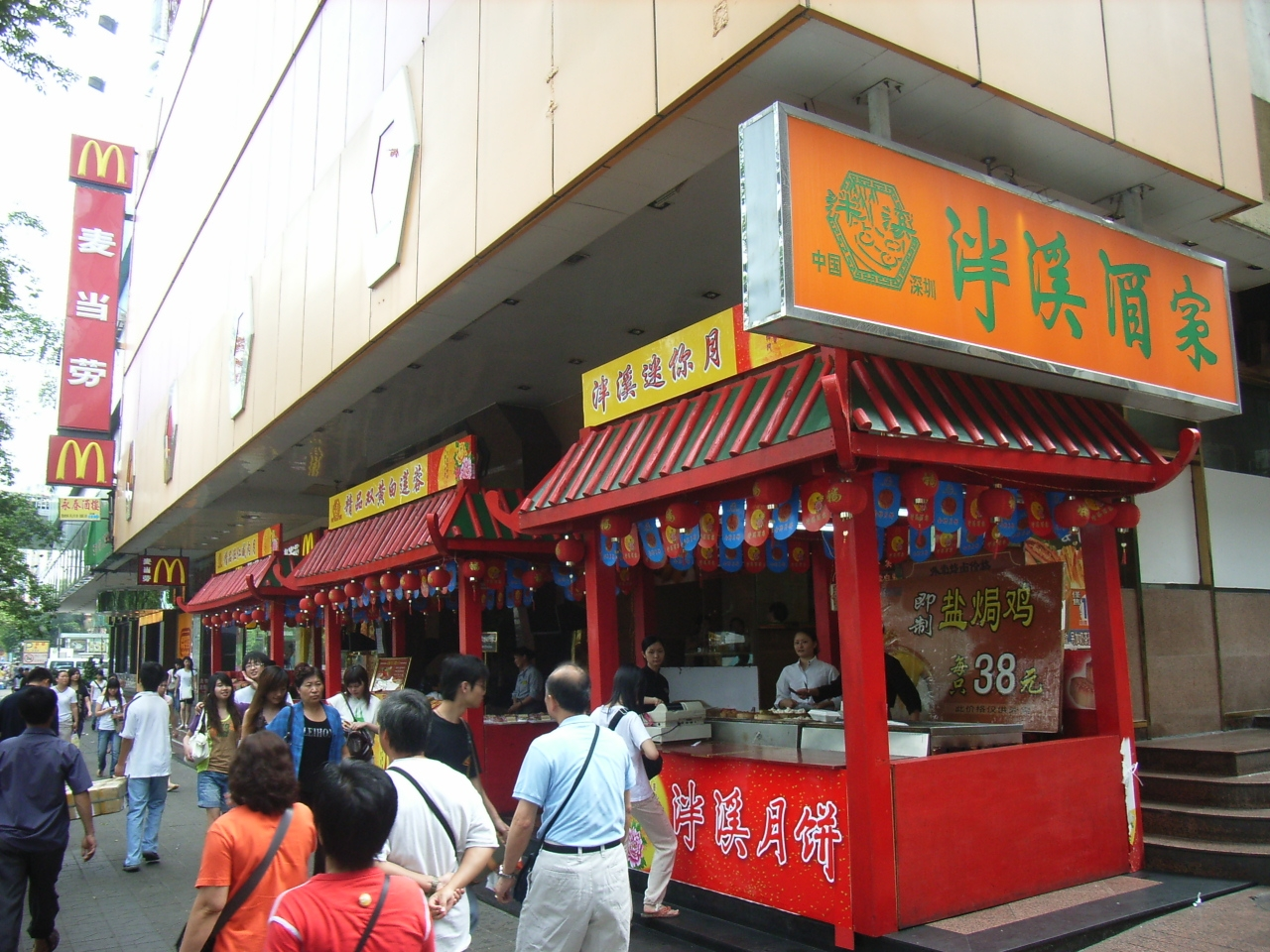
A Cantonese cuisine restaurant in the Luohu District

The main cuisine of Shenzhen is Cantonese. Due to the recent growth of migrants to the city, Shenzhen also hosts a diverse array of cuisines, including Teochew cuisine, Hakka cuisine, Sichuan cuisine, Shanghai cuisine, and Hunan cuisine.

The Yantian District is known for its Teochew-based and Hakka-based seafood, with restaurants lined up along the coastline.

Street food such as Xinjiang cuisine, and black sesame soups, can be found in Xijie Street and the urban village of Baishizhou.

Shekou area in Nanshan District is the first 'Reform and Opening Up' area in China, with a large variety of old local restaurants where one can enjoy many different cuisines.

In regard to food chains, the first McDonald's restaurant in mainland China opened for business in Shenzhen Luohu District on 8 October 1990 providing the city American fast food. Now, one can find McDonald's everywhere in the city.

Shenzhen also has its own tea culture. Shenzhen is home to the Hey Tea chain of tea shops, which provides a variety of cheese and fruit teas.

In 2020, Shenzhen passed legislation banning the consumption of cats, dogs, and wildlife, becoming the first city in China to enact a law that mandatorily prohibits the eating of cats and dogs.

== Nightlife ==
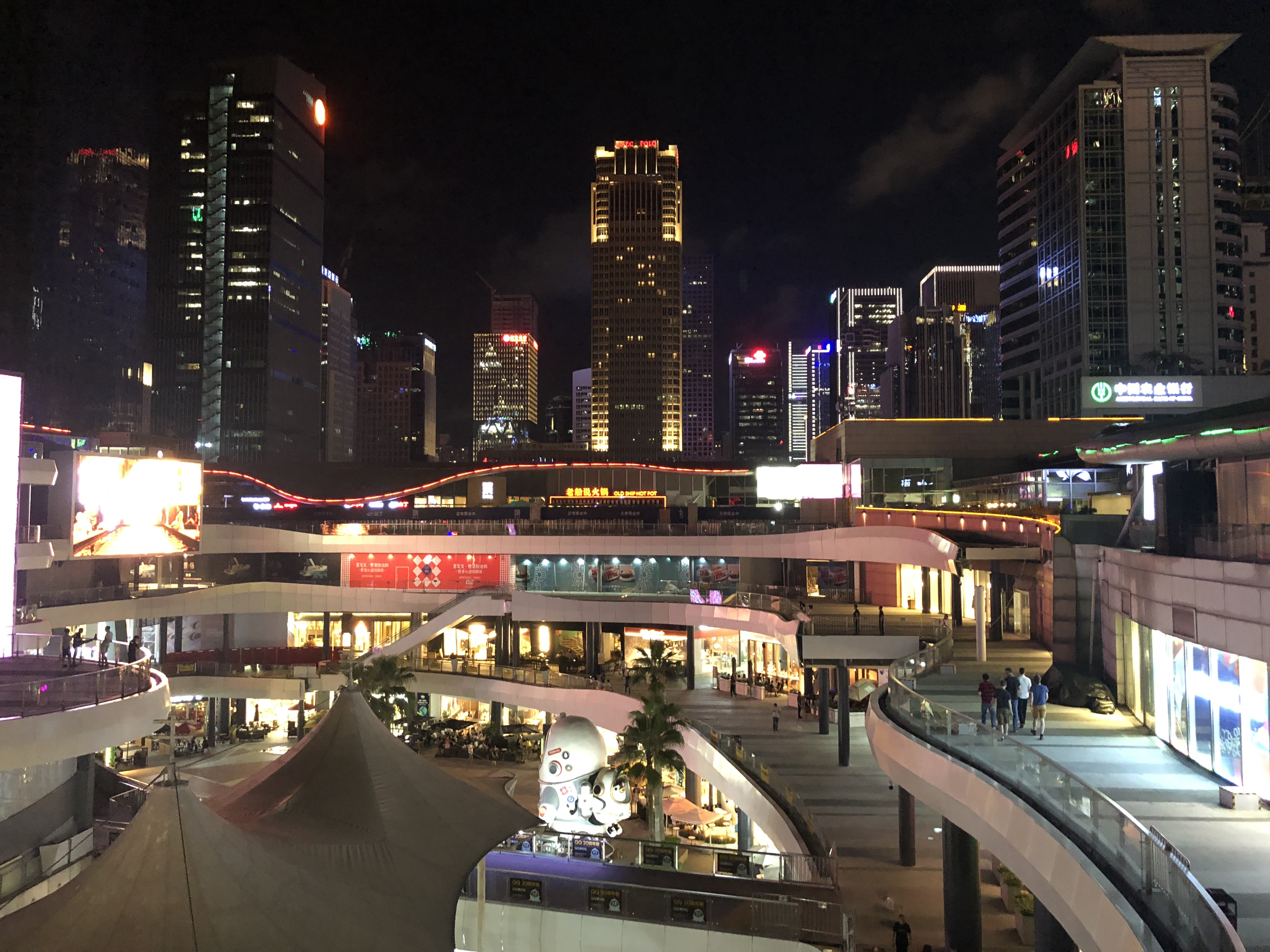
COCO Park at night

Shenzhen has a prominent nightlife culture, with most of the activity centered in the entertainment complexes of COCO Park and Shekou, with the former being referred by the South China Morning Post (SCMP) as "Shenzhen's answer to Lan Kwai Fong". There are many bars and clubs in the city, mostly unregulated, that stay open till the morning. Tunnel raves, referred by the SCMP as "a Shenzhen nightlife staple", have earned a reputation in the world, though they are often cracked down by police. Police has also cracked down on prostitution and pornography, which were elements of nightlife entertainment in Shenzhen, with one of the most prominent operations being centered in Shazui (沙嘴村) in the Futian District in the mid-2000s, resulting in closures of entertainment businesses and a decrease of foreign tourists in that area of the city.

== Sports ==
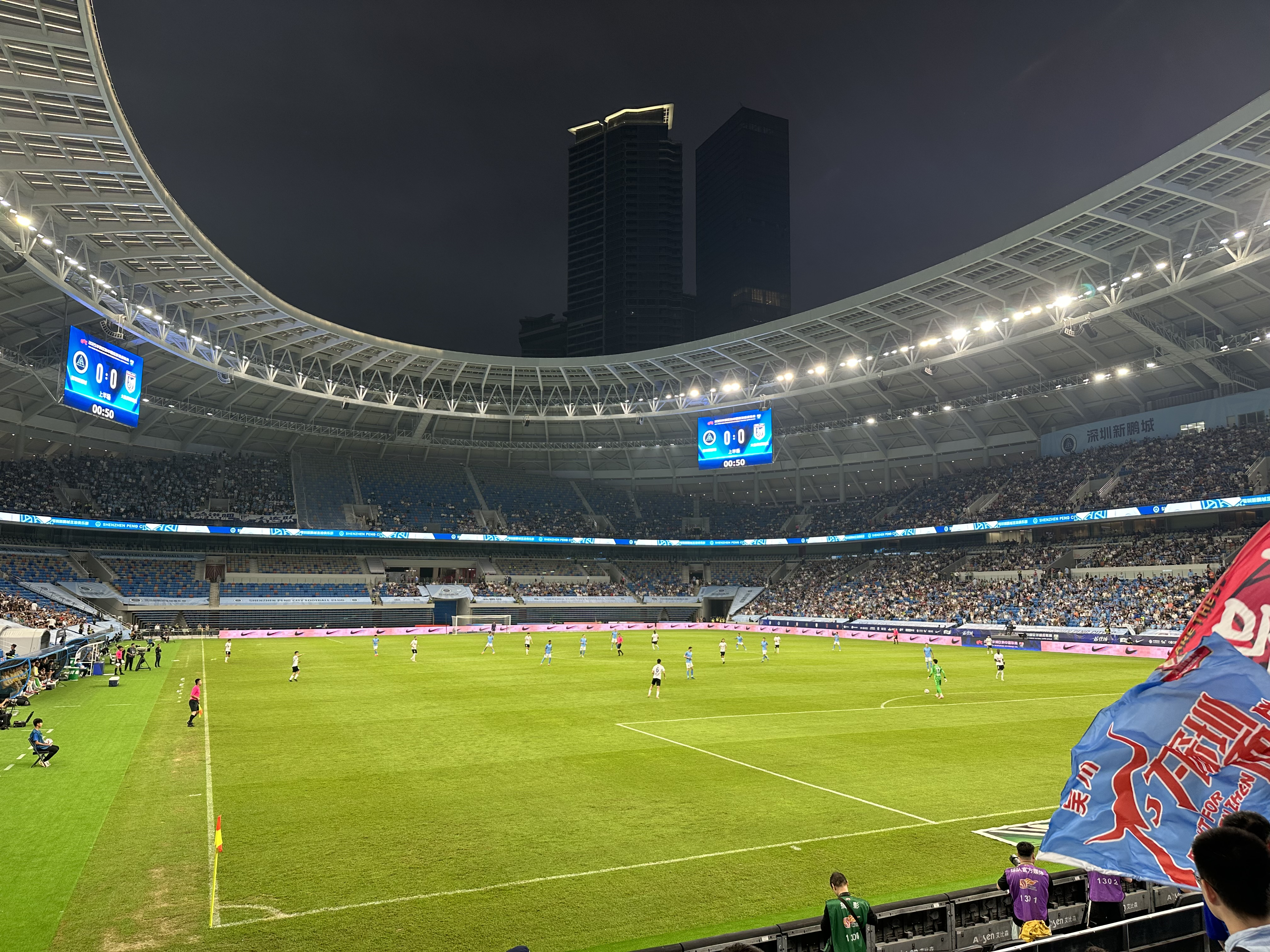
Shenzhen Sports Center Stadium

Shenzhen is home to several professional sports teams, including the Shenzhen Leopards of the Chinese Basketball Association and Shenzhen Peng City F.C. of the Chinese Super League. Other professional sports teams include Shenzhen Ledman F.C. of China League Two until the club was disbanded in 2018 and the Shenzhen KRS Vanke Rays of the Zhenskaya Hockey League.

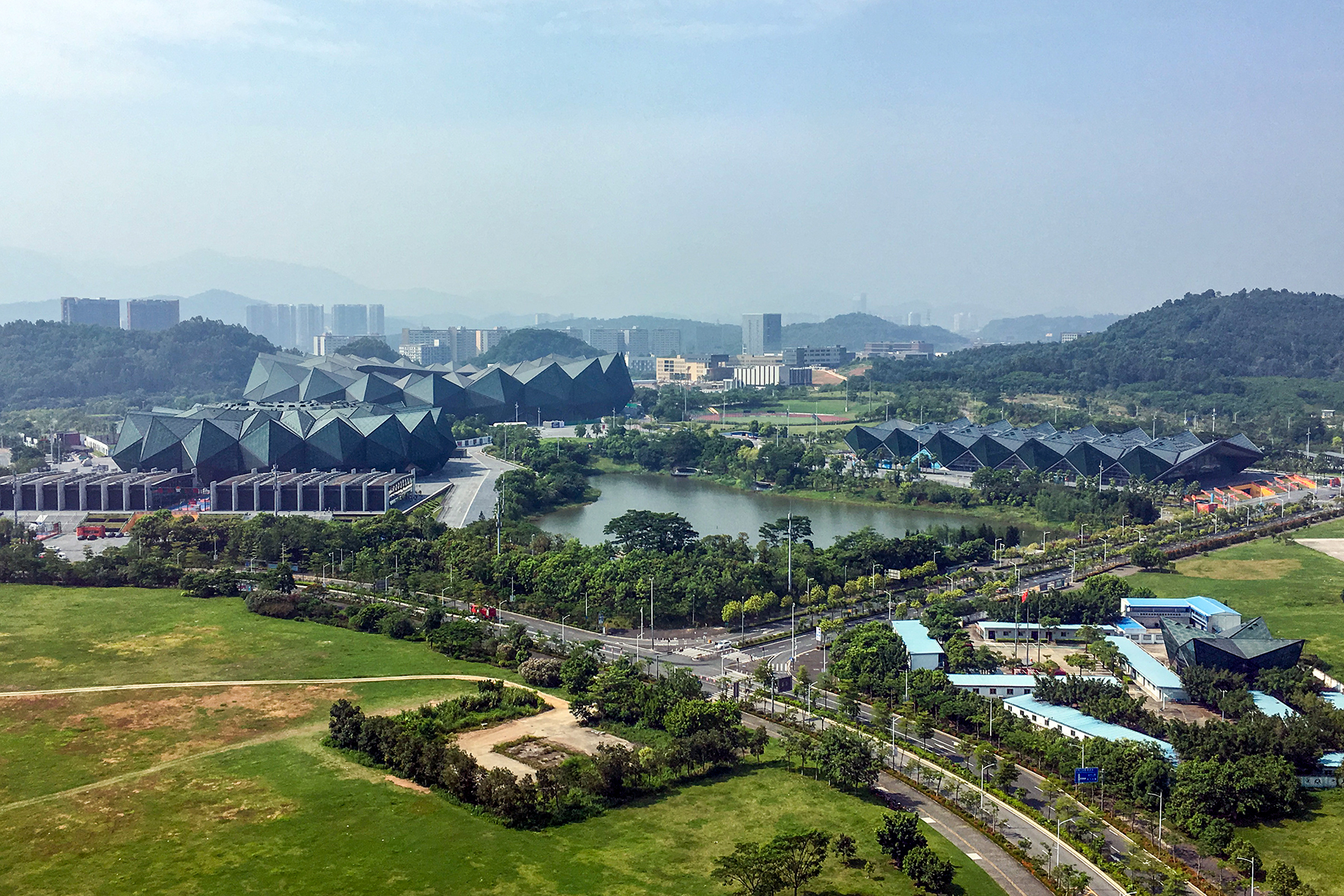
Shenzhen Universiade Sports Center

Shenzhen is the host of several international sports events. In August 2011, the city has hosted the 26th Summer Universiade, a multi-sporting event for university students. In 2018, Shenzhen hosted a pre-season National Hockey League game between the Calgary Flames and Boston Bruins. From 2019 to 2028, Shenzhen is hosting the WTA Finals tennis tournament, which is the season-ending championship for women's tennis. Shenzhen is also one of the host cities of the 2019 FIBA Basketball World Cup. Shenzhen is also a popular destination for skateboarders from all over the world, due to the architecture of the city and its lax skate laws.

Shenzhen has several multi-purpose sports venues. Shenzhen Stadium, located in the Futian District, was the home of Shenzhen F.C. until the club got dissolved in 2024. For the 2011 Summer Universiade, Shenzhen has constructed several sports venues, such as the Shenzhen Bay Sports Center in the Nanshan District and the Shenzhen Universiade Sports Centre in the Longgang District.

One of the most significant sporting events unique to Shenzhen is RoboMaster, an annual intercollegiate robot competition founded and hosted by DJI based on autonomous moving target shooting. Started in 2015, the competition introduced a 5-on-5 MOBA-style robot combat between university students around China and later the world. Rewards at the competition include a prize pool of 3,750,000 RMB and a job opportunity at DJI.

== Environment ==
=== Parks and beaches ===
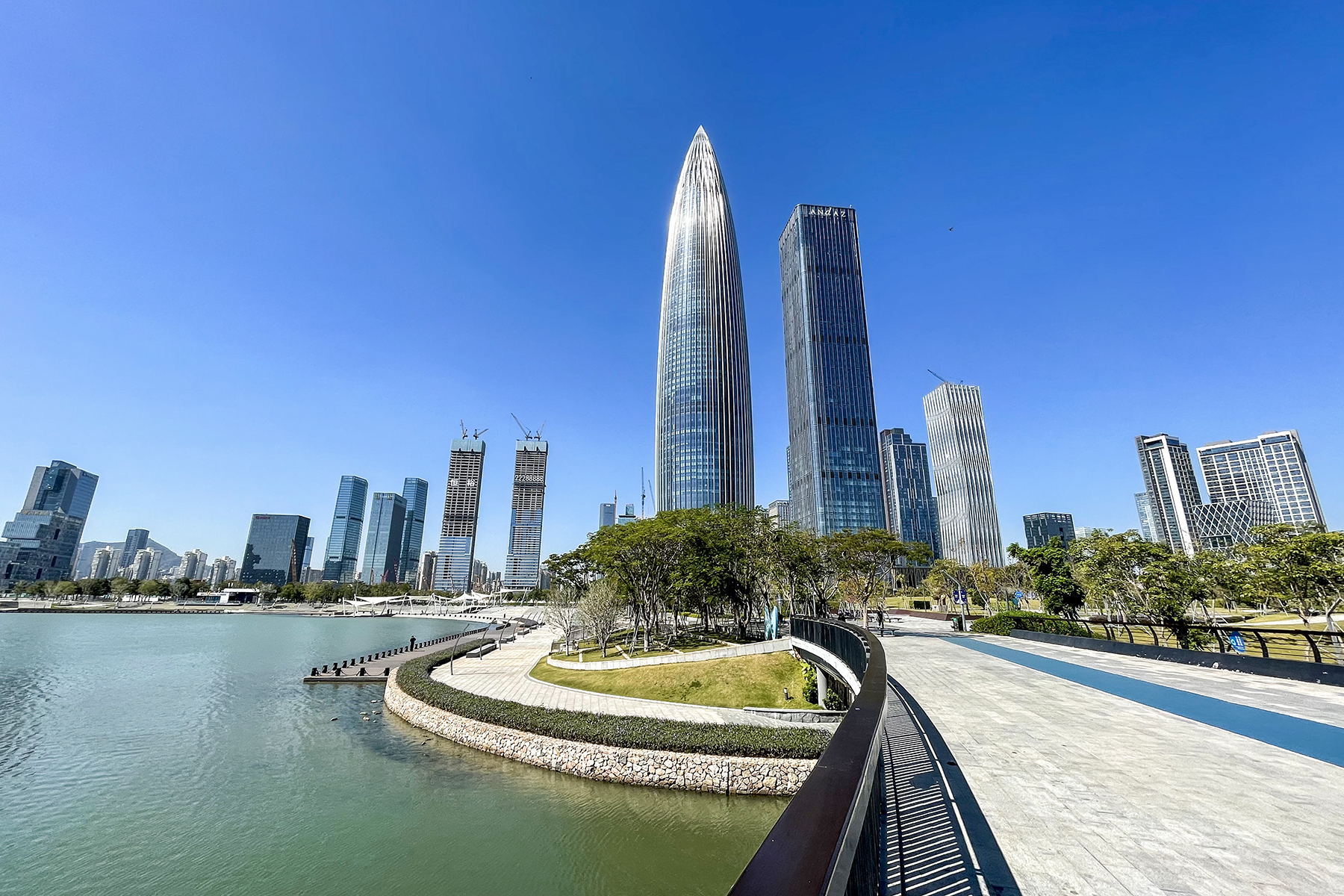
View of the China Resources Headquarters from Shenzhen Bay Park

Shenzhen has an extensive three-level public park system that was established in 2006, which categorizes parks as natural parks, urban parks, and community parks. By 2019, the city had 1,090 parks covering about 39,320 hectares, including 33 natural parks, 152 urban parks and 905 community parks. According to state-owned news outlet Xinhua, Shenzhen plans to build and renovate over 40 parks per year, bringing the number of parks in the city to 1,500 by 2035. Lianhuashan Park is located on the territory of 150 hectares in the Futian District. At the top of its Lotus Hill is a six-metre bronze statue of Deng Xiaoping. Wutongshan National Park is spread around the mountain of the same name in the Luohu District. From the observation deck, there is a view of the Shenzhen skyline as well as Hong Kong and the surrounding bay, and on the next peak there is a transmission tower of a local television station.

Shenzhen Bay Park, located along the city's coastline along Shenzhen Bay, opened in 2011, which included the nearby Mangrove Park. There are several thematic recreation areas and attractions, and along the 9-kilometer-long coastal strip there is an embankment. The Mangrove Ecopark was established in 2000 in the Futian District and at that time was the smallest national park in China. A large group of birds migrate to the ecopark in the mangroves on an area of 20.6 hectares in a 9-kilometer coastal zone of the Shenzhen Bay.

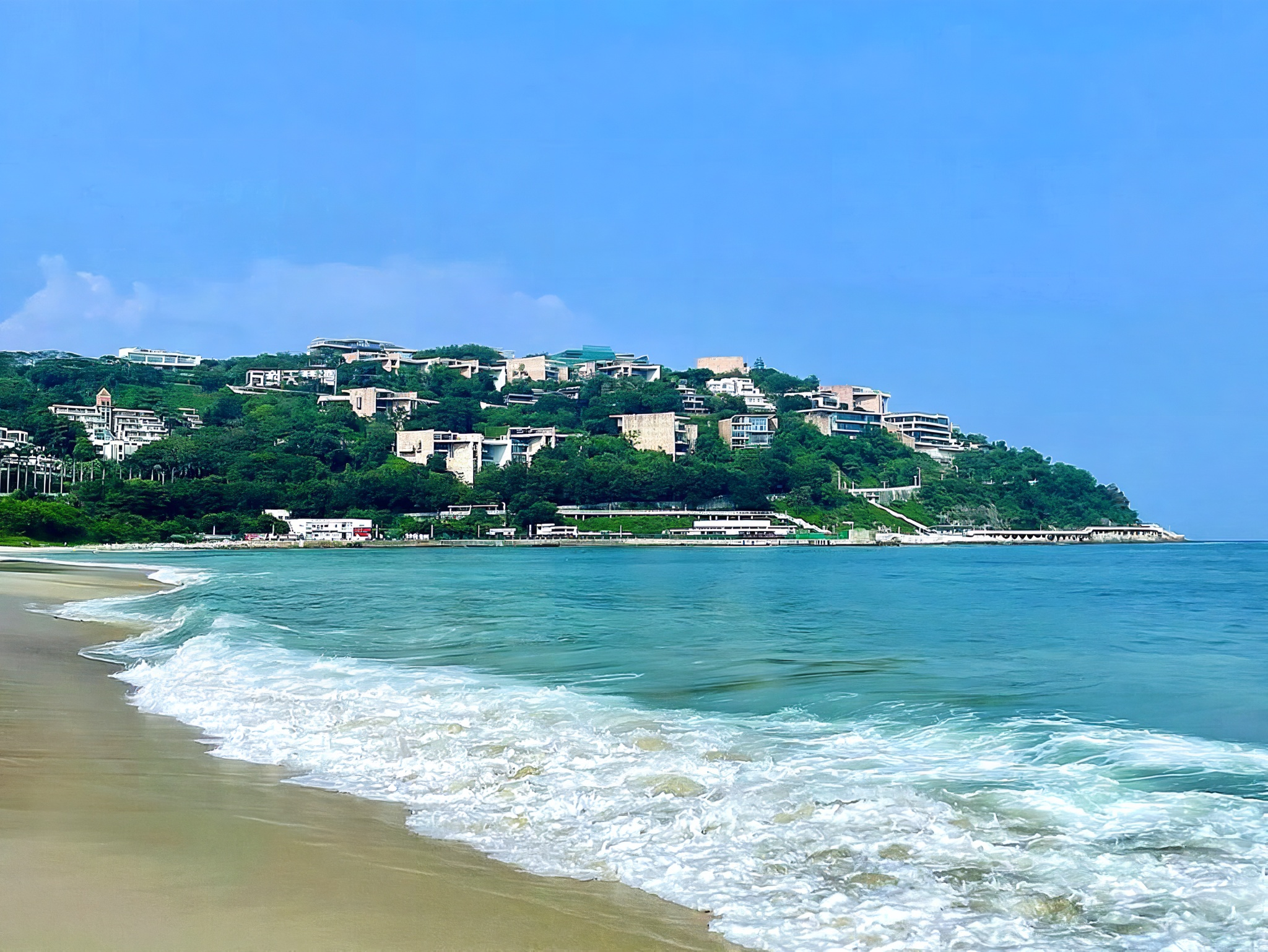
Dameisha Beach

Shenzhen Bay Park is connected to the Dashahe Park (大沙河公园, 'big sand river'), located in Nanshan District, it follows the Dashahe River. Other notable parks in Shenzhen include the Shenzhen Garden Flower Exposition Center, Shenzhen Safari Park, Xili Lake Resort, and Yangtai Mountain Fountain Park. Shenzhen also has several beaches: Dameisha (大梅沙; 'big mesa') and Xiaomeisha (小梅沙; 'small mesa') in the Yantian District, and Jinshawan (金沙湾; 'golden sands bay'), Nan'ao (南澳; 'southern inlet'), and Xichong (西冲) in Dapeng Peninsula (in the vicinity of Dapeng New District, which is administered by the Longgang District).

=== Pollution ===
During the COVID-19 pandemic, Shenzhen achieved an average air quality index (AQI) score of 44.8 μg/m^{3} and daily AQI score of 19 μg/m^{3}. Out of ten Chinese mega-cities, Shenzhen recorded the lowest in average PM_{2.5} concentration (22.5 μg/m^{3}), average PM_{10} concentration (37.7 μg/m^{3}), average carbon monoxide concentration (0.6 μg/m^{3}), and average nitrogen dioxide concentration (21.9 μg/m^{3}). Swiss environmental technology company IQAir attributed most of the pollution in Shenzhen to stem from the engineering industry, continued use of coal, and traffic.

In 2014, Shenzhen experienced severe water pollution in the city's rivers and waterways, with 173 of the 310 rivers considered to be in "critical" condition and four rivers: the Maozhou, Guanlan, Longgang and Pingshan Rivers, to be the most polluted out of all rivers in the Pearl River Delta. The pollutants in the river consisted mainly of ammonia, phosphorus, and nitrogen. In response, the city conducted a campaign to restore the city's rivers by building more water pipes and sewage treatment plants.

=== Environmental protection ===
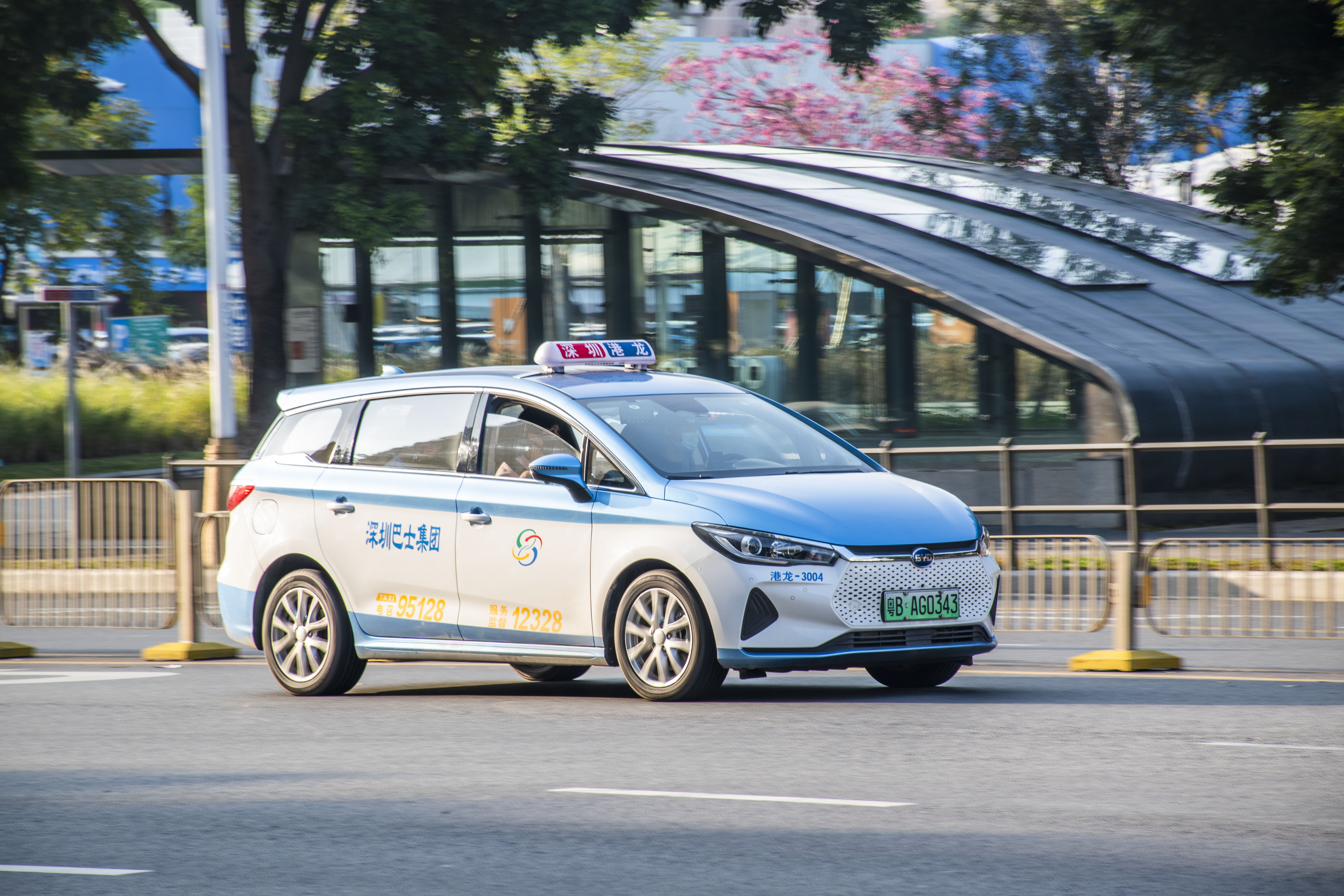
A BYD electric taxi in Shenzhen

From 2000 to 2014, Shenzhen spent 30 billion RMB to restore the city's rivers from water pollution, which some were considered at the time to be the most polluted in the Pearl River Delta. The city had constructed 33 sewage treatment plants and laid almost 4,300 kilometres (2,700 mi) of sewage pipes. By 2020, the city laid an additional 3,274 kilometres (2,034 mi) of water pipelines and completed 13,793 pipeline renovation projects in urban villages and housing estates.

In 2009, Shenzhen was chosen as one of thirteen cities to pilot a national new-energy vehicle program. In 2017, Shenzhen offered 3.3 billion RMB in subsidies in electric buses and the construction of charging facilities. In mid-2018, the city made major headlines for being the first city to roll an all-electric public bus fleet. In the same year, more than half of the city's taxi fleet are electric, with the goal to turn the fleet all-electric. By early 2019, Shenzhen rolled out an all-electric taxi fleet, with 99% of taxis now electric-powered.

In late 2019, Shenzhen launched a garbage classification program in which waste is to be sorted in four categories: recyclables, kitchen waste, hazardous waste, and other waste. Residents who follow the guidelines will be given cash while those who do not would be fined by the government.

== Media ==
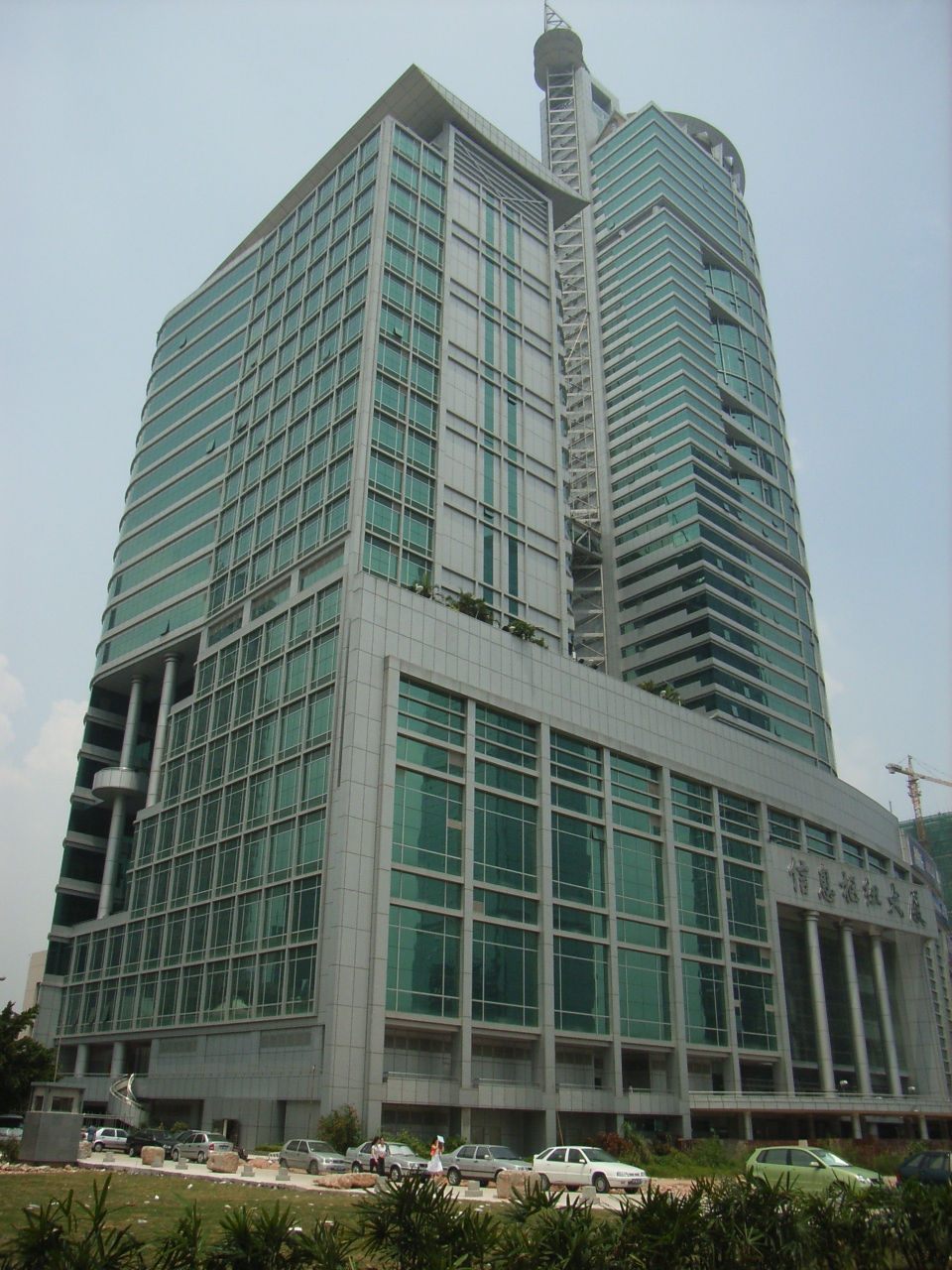
Shenzhen Telecentre

In Shenzhen there are 14 newspapers, one comprehensive publishing house, three video-audio products publishing houses, 88 bureaus of inland and Hong Kong media organizations, 40 periodicals, and about 200 kinds of in-house publications of which the majority belong to enterprises. The most prominent media companies in Shenzhen are the Shenzhen Media Group, the Shenzhen Press Group, China Entertainment Television (CETV), and Phoenix Television branch iFeng.

Shenzhen News (深圳晚报, sznews.com) is a Chinese-language newspaper owned by the Shenzhen Press Group that serves as Shenzhen's main online news source. Shenzhen Daily is an English-language news outlet for Shenzhen covering local, national and international news. That's Shenzhen is the Shenzhen edition of That's PRD, an English-language media company with an online, print and social footprint. ShekouDaily.com is an online media outlet providing news and resources focusing on the Shekou sub-district in Nanshan District of Shenzhen.

== Relations with Hong Kong ==
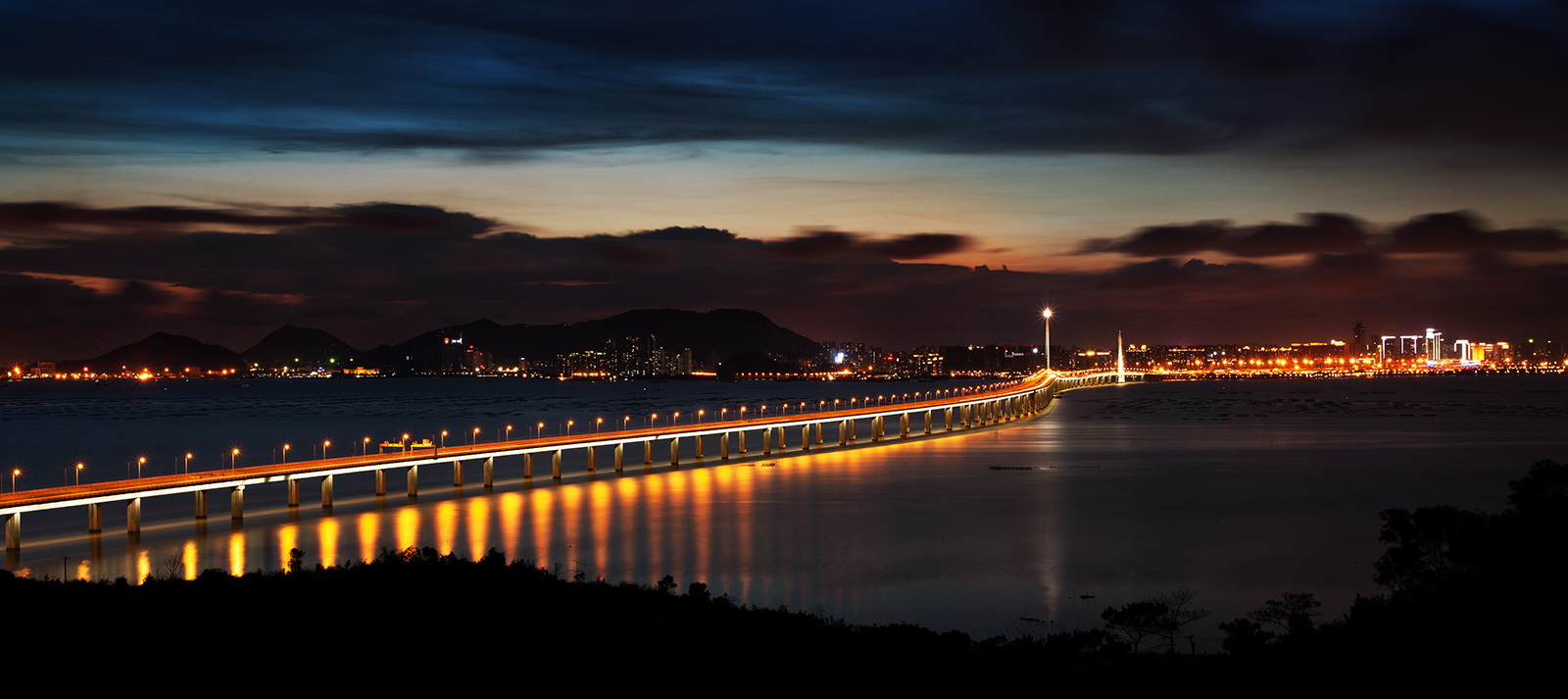
The Shenzhen Bay Bridge forms part of the Shenzhen Bay Port crossing, connecting Dongjiaotou in Shenzhen with Ngau Hom Shek in Hong Kong.

The area encompassed by Shenzhen and Hong Kong formerly belonged to Bao'an County in imperial times. After the Qing defeat in the Second Opium War, the United Kingdom seized Hong Kong Island and was leased the New Territories, forming the modern-day boundaries between Hong Kong and Shenzhen (the successor to Bao'an). The two cities are separated by two bays: Shenzhen Bay and Mirs Bay, and a river: Sham Chun River. According to then-Executive Council member Leung Chun-ying, the two cities' close relationship can be due to the close distance between the two, similar economic systems, differences in wages and price levels, and that the two cities have different systems compared to other Chinese cities, with Hong Kong embracing the one country, two systems principle while Shenzhen is a SEZ.

From the establishment of Shenzhen as a SEZ in 1980 to 2007, Hong Kong has been Shenzhen's largest trade partner, with exports to Hong Kong accounted for 46.6% of Shenzhen's total exports. In 2015, the total import and export volume of Shenzhen Port to Hong Kong was 1.1 trillion RMB. Both cities had established the Qianhai Shenzhen-Hong Kong Modern Service Industries Cooperation Zone within the Nanshan District which is a free-trade zone that mirrors the economic policies of both cities and to bring Hong Kong closer to mainland China. Tencent estimated that by 2020, Qianhai is expected to create a total output value of 150 billion RMB, with an output of 10 billion RMB per square kilometer. As of 23 February 2021, Qianhai has a total of 11,325 firms from Hong Kong.

As of September 2016, there are nine crossing points on the boundary between Shenzhen and Hong Kong, among which six are land connections. From west to east these include the Shenzhen Bay Port, Futian Port, Huanggang Port, Man Kam To Port, Luohu Port and Shatoujiao Port. On either sides of each of these ports of entry are road and/or rail transportation.

== Sister cities ==
Shenzhen has been very active in cultivating sister city relationships. In October 1989, Shenzhen Mayor Li Hao and a delegation travelled to Houston to attend the signing ceremony establishing a sister city relationship between Houston and Shenzhen. Houston became the first sister city of Shenzhen. As of 2015, Shenzhen has established sister city relationship with 25 cities in the world. As of May 2021, Shenzhen is twinned with the following regions, cities, and counties:

- Houston, United States, since March 1986
- Plovdiv, Bulgaria, since November 2013
- Brescia, Italy, since November 1991
- Brisbane, Australia, since June 1992
- Poznań, Poland, since July 1993
- Kingston, Jamaica, since March 1995
- Lomé, Togo, since June 1996
- Nuremberg, Germany, since May 1997
- Walloon Brabant, Belgium, since October 2003
- Tsukuba, Japan, since June 2004
- Gwangyang, South Korea, since October 2004
- Johor Bahru, Malaysia, since July 2006
- Perm, since Russia, 2006
- Turin, Italy, since January 2007
- Timișoara, Romania, since February 2007
- Hull, United Kingdom
- Rotherham, United Kingdom, since November 2007
- Luxor, Egypt, since 6 September 2007
- Reno, United States, since 30 April 2008
- Samara, Russia, since 19 December 2008
- Montevideo, Uruguay, since February 2009
- Kalocsa, Hungary, since 2011
- Haifa, Israel, since 2012
- Barcelona, Spain, since July 2012
- Apia, Samoa, since August 2015
- Phnom Penh, Cambodia, since December 2017
- Edinburgh, Scotland, since June 2019

=== Other twinnings ===
The Shenzhen Port is twinned and has collaboration agreements with:

- The Port of Santa Cruz de Tenerife, Spain, since June 2013.

== See also ==
- Shenzhen Special Economic Zone
- Index of Shenzhen-related articles
- Administrative divisions of the People's Republic of China
- Economy of China
- List of twin towns and sister cities in China
- Pearl River (China)
- Puxin Biogas
- First‑tier city
