= Shenzhen Municipal People's Government =

Local government in China

Shenzhen Municipal People's Government 深圳市人民政府
- Established: 29 January 1979

Leadership
- Mayor: Jin Lei since 22 March 2026
- Deputy Mayors: Tao Yongxin, Zhang Hua, Dai Jintao, Luo Huanghao, Wang Wei
- Secretary-general: Lu Wenpeng
- Parent body: Guangdong Provincial People's Government; Shenzhen Municipal People's Congress
- Elected by: Shenzhen Municipal People's Congress

Website
- www.sz.gov.cn

The Shenzhen Municipal People's Government is the municipal administrative agency of Shenzhen. It is officially elected by the Shenzhen Municipal People's Congress and is formally responsible to the Municipal People's Congress and its Standing Committee. The municipal government is headed by a mayor, currently Qin Weizhong. Under the country's one-party system, the mayor is subordinate to the secretary of the Shenzhen Municipal Committee of the Chinese Communist Party.

== History ==
On July 29, 1959, the People's Commune Committee of Bao'an County was established. On February 27, 1968, the Revolutionary Committee of Bao'an County was established. On January 23, 1979, the administrative system of Bao'an County was abolished and Shenzhen City was established, with the Guangdong provincial government and Huiyang Prefecture exercising dual leadership. At the same time , the Shenzhen Revolutionary Committee was established . On January 29, 1979, the Shenzhen Municipal People's Government was established. In early April 1979, the Standing Committee of the CCP Guangdong Provincial Committee discussed and proposed to the Central Committee to set aside a piece of land in Shenzhen, Zhuhai and Shantou to establish a trade cooperation zone. In the same month, the Central Working Conference decided on the "Regulations on Several Issues Concerning Vigorously Developing Foreign Trade and Increasing Foreign Exchange Income", agreeing to pilot " export special zones " in Shenzhen, Zhuhai , Shantou and Xiamen. In March 1981, the Shenzhen Municipal People's Government was upgraded from prefecture-level to vice-provincial level.

== Organization ==
The organization of the Shenzhen Municipal People's Government includes:

- General Office of the Shenzhen Municipal People's Government

=== Component Departments ===
- Shenzhen Municipal Development and Reform Commission
- Shenzhen Municipal Education Bureau
- Shenzhen Science and Technology Innovation Bureau
- Shenzhen Municipal Bureau of Industry and Information Technology
- Shenzhen Public Security Bureau
- Shenzhen Municipal Civil Affairs Bureau
- Shenzhen Justice Bureau
- Shenzhen Municipal Finance Bureau
- Shenzhen Municipal Human Resources and Social Security Bureau
- Shenzhen Municipal Planning and Natural Resources Bureau
- Shenzhen Municipal Ecological Environment Bureau
- Shenzhen Housing and Construction Bureau
- Shenzhen Municipal Transportation Bureau
- Shenzhen Water Authority
- Shenzhen Municipal Bureau of Commerce
- Shenzhen Municipal Bureau of Culture, Radio, Television, Tourism and Sports
- Shenzhen Municipal Health Commission
- Shenzhen Veterans Affairs Bureau
- Shenzhen Municipal Emergency Management Bureau
- Shenzhen Audit Bureau
- Shenzhen Municipal People's Government State-owned Assets Supervision and Administration Commission
- Shenzhen Municipal Administration for Market Regulation
- Shenzhen Municipal Government Services and Data Administration Bureau
- Shenzhen Statistics Bureau
- Shenzhen Medical Security Bureau
- Shenzhen Municipal Urban Management and Comprehensive Law Enforcement Bureau
- Shenzhen Municipal People's Government Port Office
- Shenzhen Rural Revitalization and Cooperation Exchange Bureau
- Shenzhen Petition Bureau
- Shenzhen Ocean Development Bureau
- Shenzhen Investment Promotion Bureau

=== Department management agencies ===
- Shenzhen Small and Medium Enterprises Service Bureau is managed by the Municipal Bureau of Industry and Information Technology.
- Shenzhen Urban Renewal Bureau is managed by the Municipal Housing and Construction Bureau.
- Traffic Police Bureau of Shenzhen Municipal Public Security Bureau is managed by the Municipal Public Security Bureau.
- Shenzhen Social Insurance Fund Management Bureau is managed by the Municipal Human Resources and Social Security Bureau.

=== Directly affiliated institutions ===
- Shenzhen Municipal People's Government Development Research Center
- Shenzhen Municipal Government Affairs Bureau
- Shenzhen Municipal Construction Engineering Bureau
- Shenzhen Meteorological Bureau
- Shenzhen Arbitration Commission
- Shenzhen Industrial Park Development Bureau, Shenzhen Hetao Shenzhen-Hong Kong Science and Technology Innovation Cooperation Zone
- Shenzhen University (Department Level)
- Southern University of Science and Technology (unclear administrative level)
- Shenzhen University of Technology (Department Level)
- Shenzhen Polytechnic
- Shenzhen Vocational College of Information Technology

=== Dispatched agencies ===
- Shenzhen Dapeng New District Management Committee
- Shenzhen Shenshan Special Cooperation Zone Management Committee
- Shenzhen Qianhai Shenzhen-Hong Kong Modern Service Industry Cooperation Zone Administration
- Shenzhen Municipal People's Government Office in Beijing
