= Chen Rugui =

Chinese politician

- 陈如桂

Mayor of Shenzhen
- In office 22 August 2017 – April 2021
- Party Secretary: Wang Weizhong
- Preceded by: Xu Qin
- Succeeded by: Qin Weizhong

Personal details
- Born: September 1962 (age 63–64) Lianjiang County, Guangdong, China
- Party: Chinese Communist Party (1992–2022; expelled)
- Education: Guilin University of Technology; Central South University

Chinese name
- Simplified Chinese: 陈如桂
- Traditional Chinese: 陳如桂
Transcriptions
Standard Mandarin
- Hanyu Pinyin: Chén Rúguì

Chen Rugui (Chinese: 陈如桂; born September 1962) is a Chinese politician who is the current vice chairman of Guangdong Provincial People's Congress. Previously he served as mayor of Shenzhen. He was a representative of the 19th National Congress of the Chinese Communist Party and is a delegate to the 13th National People's Congress. He was investigated by China's top anti-graft agency in June 2022.

== Early life and education ==
Chen was born in Lianjiang County (now Lianjiang), Guangdong, in September 1962. After passing the college entrance examination in 1979, he attended Guilin Institute of Metallurgical Geology (now Guilin University of Technology), majoring in geophysical prospecting. He taught there after his graduation. In 1986, he became a graduate student at Central South University of Technology (now Central South University).

== Political career ==
After graduating in May 1989, he was assigned as an official to the Guangzhou Institute of Building Science, and was promoted to its president in March 1998. He joined the Chinese Communist Party (CCP) in October 1992. In August 1999, he became the vice chairman and vice general manager of Guangzhou Construction Group Co. Ltd., rising to chairman and general manager in June 2000. He served as deputy director of Guangzhou Municipal Construction Commission in July 2001, and was promoted to director in May 2003. He was appointed as secretary-general of Guangzhou Municipal People's Government in March 2007, and in June 2010 was admitted as a member of the standing committee of the CCP Guangzhou Municipal Committee, the city's top authority. He was vice mayor of Guangzhou in December 2011, and held that office until September 2015, when he was made deputy party secretary of Guangzhou and secretary of the Guangzhou Municipal Political and Legal Affairs Commission. He was promoted to be party secretary of Zhongshan in September 2016, concurrently serving as chairman of its People's Congress since January 2017. In July 2017, he was promoted to deputy party secretary and acting mayor of Shenzhen, confirmed on August 22. In April 2021, he took office as vice chairman of Guangdong People's Congress.

== Downfall ==
On 1 June 2022, Chen was put under investigation for alleged "serious violations of discipline and laws" by the Central Commission for Discipline Inspection (CCDI), the party's internal disciplinary body, and the National Supervisory Commission, the highest anti-corruption agency of China. On 30 December 2022, he was expelled from the CCP and dismissed from public office.

On 18 January 2023, Chen was arrested by the Supreme People's Procuratorate for suspected bribe taking.

On 6 August 2024, Chen was sentenced to life in jail for taking bribes valued at more than 108 million yuan ($15 million). He was deprived of his political rights for life, and all his personal assets were confiscated.

Party political offices
Preceded by Xue Xiaofeng	Party Secretary of Zhongshan; 2016–2017	Succeeded by Chen Xudong
Assembly seats
Preceded by Xue Xiaofeng	Chairman of Zhongshan Municipal People's Congress; 2017	Succeeded by Chen Xudong
Government offices
Preceded by Xu Qin	Mayor of Shenzhen; 2017–2021	Succeeded by Qin Weizhong
