= 2008 Shanxi mudslide =

Mudslide in Linfen, China

- Date: September 8, 2008
- Time: 08:00 CST
- Location: Xiangfen, Shanxi, China
- Deaths: 277
- Injuries: 33
- Missing: 4

The 2008 Shanxi mudslide was caused by the collapse of an unlicensed mine landfill in Xiangfen county, Linfen, Shanxi Province, People's Republic of China which caused 277 dead, 4 missing and 33 injured. Around 8:00 a.m. on September 8, 2008, the retaining wall of a waste iron ore reservoir collapsed after torrential rain, causing a major mudslide which inundated a village and crowded marketplace. The unlicensed Tashan Mine was operated by the Tashan Mining Company.

== History ==
The ore reservoir was built in the 1980s, halfway up a mountain, about 50 meters above an office building, marketplace and some residences. It was built only 100 meters away from the nearest residence. The reservoir was supposedly decommissioned a few years later, but its new owner, Zhang Peiliang, put it back into use when he took over the company in 2005. In 2006, the Tashan Mining Company did not renew its safety production license, and in 2007, the mining license of Zhang also expired.

== Damages and casualties ==
The entire village of Yunhe was inundated by the mudslide, including an outdoor market crowded with customers. As of September 24, the Chinese state media reported that the death toll was 267, and the number of injuries 34. Only 128 bodies, mostly of locals, have been identified. Some 268,000 cubic meters of mudslide sludge flooded over an area of 30.2 hectares in the disaster, and the mud was up to six meters deep in some parts.

The final official count is: 277 dead, 4 missing and 33 injured.

A worker had said "It's not because of the rain. It wasn't a natural disaster, it was man-made." Up to 500 people may still be buried, according to the Information Centre for Human Rights and Democracy.

== Rescue efforts ==
5,300 police and rescuers, using more than 110 excavators, were looking for survivors. The rescuers covered about 90% of the mudslide zone so far. In addition, 2,100 medical workers were at the site to provide medical care.

== Aftermath ==
1,047 people were displaced because of the mudslide. The provincial level government said relatives of the dead would receive 200,000 yuan (US$ 29,215). The Communist Party chief, the head of Taosi township, work safety bureau director, and chief engineer in Xiangfen county were dismissed for neglect of duty. Thirteen mine executives, including Zhang Peiliang, were detained by Chinese authorities, and four other local officials were also dismissed. The State Administration of Work Safety (SAWS) said that an investigation is pending, and that the people responsible would be "punished in line with the relevant laws." Wang Jun, the director of SAWS said, "It is the most grave accident that involves the largest death toll so far this year. The rising accidents disclose local governments' poor supervision on work safety. Those responsible must be dealt with seriously." Meng Xuenong, Governor of Shanxi, resigned a day after the event, on September 14. Wang Jun was subsequently transferred to become Governor of Shanxi.

In September 2010, 58 people, including 34 former government officials, were handed out sentences in relation to the collapse.
