= Meng Xuenong =

Chinese politician (born 1949)

- 孟学农

Governor of Shanxi
- In office 3 September 2007 – 14 September 2008
- Party Secretary: Zhang Baoshun
- Preceded by: Yu Youjun
- Succeeded by: Wang Jun

Mayor of Beijing
- In office January 2003 – April 2003
- Party Secretary: Liu Qi
- Preceded by: Liu Qi
- Succeeded by: Wang Qishan

Personal details
- Born: August 1949 (age 77) Penglai County, Shandong, China
- Party: Chinese Communist Party
- Education: University of Science and Technology of China
- Occupation: Politician

Meng Xuenong (simplified Chinese: 孟学农; traditional Chinese: 孟學農; pinyin: Mèng Xuénóng; born August 1949) is a Chinese politician. Meng worked as a factory worker in Beijing before getting involved in politics through the local Communist Youth League organization. He was the Vice Mayor of Beijing between 1993 and 2003, before being promoted to mayor for a brief interlude in 2003. He was sacked as mayor only after a few months on the job due to his government's mismanagement of the SARS epidemic.

Meng then worked as a low-profile functionary in the South-North Water Transfer Project, before making a political comeback as the Governor of Shanxi in 2007. He resigned that post a year into his term, following what was considered a botched response to the 2008 Shanxi mudslide by the provincial government. In December 2009, Meng was given a post on the body that manages the work of the directly-controlled organizations of the Communist Party's central committee (中共中央直属机关工作委员会). In 2012, he gained a largely ceremonial post as the head of a legal affairs committee of the Chinese People's Political Consultative Conference.

He has been a member of the Central Committee of the Chinese Communist Party since November 2002.

== Career ==
Meng was born in Penglai County, Shandong. Meng studied engineering at Beijing Normal University (1969–72) during the later stages of the Cultural Revolution before being assigned to Beijing's No.2 Motor Vehicle Plant. He joined the Chinese Communist Party (CCP) in July 1972, rising through the ranks of the Beijing municipal Communist Youth League (CYL) and the car industry. In 1986 he was transferred to senior posts in the hospitality industry, briefly serving as General Manager of the Beijing Hotel group. He then spent four years (1991–1995) at the University of Science and Technology of China, alongside Qiang Wei, who had been a consistent colleague. After graduating with an MBA, he became a vice-mayor of Beijing in 1993.

In January 2003, Meng was appointed Mayor of Beijing; as mayor he also held the title of Deputy Party Secretary of Beijing. The SARS crisis hit Beijing sometime in March of that year, and Meng is said to have moved patients between hospitals in a botched cover-up that worsened the outbreak. The Politburo Standing Committee decided to remove him from his posts on 16 April as part of a double sacking with health minister Zhang Wenkang. The pair were held responsible both for the public health failure and the damage to trust in the Party. The sacking was described by one journalist as "the biggest political earthquake since the time of Tiananmen in 1989." The harsh treatment was privately questioned by other cadres in Beijing, but they were assured that Meng's co-operative attitude would be rewarded. Five months later, he was quietly created deputy director of the South-North Water Transfer Project, reporting to the State Council.

Meng was appointed Deputy Secretary of the Shanxi Party Committee on August 30, 2007 as part of a wider Party reshuffle, and then elected Vice Governor and acting Governor by the Shanxi Provincial People's Congress on 3 September. His political fortunes, however, proved short-lived when he tendered his resignation on September 14, 2008, after the mudslide in Xiangfen.

== Faction and policies ==
Meng is a member of the tuanpai faction of former Communist Youth League officials and has close personal ties to Party General secretary Hu Jintao. As he stated himself, "My career in the CCYL [sic] provided a foundation for my political career later on." At a news conference in January 2003, he portrayed himself as an old friend of Hu, stating "Comrade Jintao was a major leader in the Communist Youth League 20 years ago and some of us worked under his leadership... What I remember most deeply are his fairness, personal integrity and selflessness. Those qualities make up his unique charisma." However, this has been subsequently disputed. Hu allegedly fired his protégé in order to remove Zhang, linked to rival Jiang Zemin. Some reports claimed the mayor was "sacrificed" to protect Liu Qi. It was even claimed that Meng is closer to Liu (and thus Jiang) than Hu. However, most commentators saw Meng's return to power as a sign of the tuanpai faction's dominance. Ultimately much of this turned out to be irrelevant as tuanpai became a diminished force under the leadership of Xi Jinping.

The People's Daily at one point portrayed Meng as reformist. Meng said that his CYL experience helps him stay in touch with young people and remain open-minded. Meng once resided in Beijing's Siheyuan, and kept in touch with his former neighbours during his time as mayor, claiming a special understanding of the people. On his election in Taiyuan, he told delegates of the People's Congress , "I will do my utmost best to get familiar with Shanxi and become like a native... [the governorship is] a great honour, but also comes with great responsibility."

Political offices
Preceded by Liu Qi	Mayor of Beijing; 2003	Succeeded by Wang Qishan
Preceded by Yu Youjun	Governor of Shanxi; 2007–2008	Succeeded by Wang Jun
