= Shenzhen Press Group =

Chinese state media company

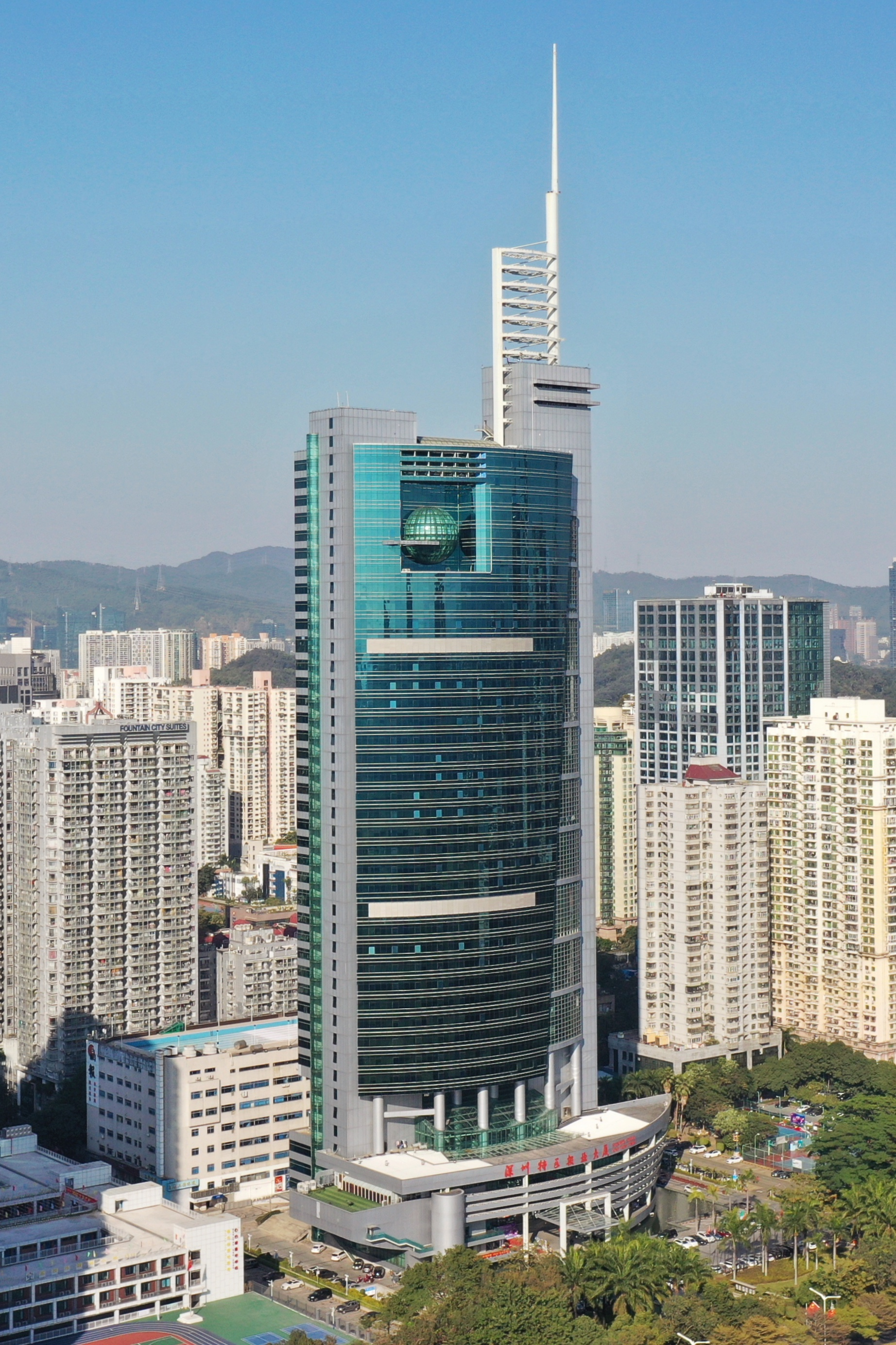
- Headquarters of the Shenzhen Press Group
- Formation: September 2002; 22 years ago
- Type: State media
- Headquarters: Shenzhen, Guangdong
- Parent organization: Shenzhen Municipal Committee of the Chinese Communist Party
- Website: www.sznews.com

Shenzhen Press Group
- Simplified Chinese: 深圳报业集团
- Traditional Chinese: 深圳報業集團
Transcriptions
Standard Mandarin
- Hanyu Pinyin: Shēnzhèn Bàoyè Jítuán

The Shenzhen Press Group is a state media company in Shenzhen overseen by the Shenzhen Municipal Committee of the Chinese Communist Party (CCP).

The newspapers of the Shenzhen Press Group include Shenzhen Special Zone Daily, Shenzhen Evening News, Shenzhen Business Daily, and Jingbao. The Press Group is located in the Press Building on the north side of the Futian section of Shennan Avenue, close to the Shenzhen Radio and Television Building and Futian CBD. The Press Building is one of the landmark buildings in Shenzhen.

== History ==
The Shenzhen Press Group was established in September 2002 by merging the former Shenzhen Special Zone Press Group (established on November 1, 1999, on the basis of Shenzhen Special Zone Daily) and Shenzhen Business Daily.

According to the 2018 News and Publishing Industry Analysis Report released by the State Administration of Press and Publication, Shenzhen Press Group ranked seventh in the overall economic scale comprehensive evaluation. In 2018, Shenzhen Special Economic Zone Daily was selected into the recommended list of the top 100 newspapers in China in 2017.

== Publications ==
There are a variety of publications under the Shenzhen Press Group, including:

=== Newspapers ===
- Shenzhen Special Zone Daily
- Shenzhen Business Daily
- Shenzhen Evening News
- Crystal News
- Shenzhen Youth News
- Bao'an Daily
- Shenzhen Daily

==== Co-sponsored newspapers ====
- Hong Kong Commercial Daily (49%, the remaining shares are held by the United Publishing Group under the Hong Kong Liaison Office)

=== Journals ===
- Automobile Herald
- Travel around the world
- True Life
- Special Zone Education

The Group also owns the Shenzhen Publishing House.
