= Dai Beifang =

- 戴北方

Chairperson of the Shenzhen Municipal Committee of the Chinese People's Political Consultative Conference
- In office June 2015 – September 2020
- Preceded by: Wang Suiming
- Succeeded by: Lin Jie

Personal details
- Born: December 1956 (age 69) Huiyang Prefecture, Guangdong, China
- Party: Chinese Communist Party (1975-2026, expelled)
- Education: South China Normal University; Shanghai Jiao Tong University

Dai Beifang (Chinese: 戴北方; pinyin: Dài Běifāng; born December 1956) is a retired Chinese politician who spent his entire career in Shenzhen, a sub-provincial city in south China's Guangdong province. As of December 2025 he was under investigation by China's top anti-graft watchdog. Previously he served as chairperson of the Shenzhen Municipal Committee of the Chinese People's Political Consultative Conference. He was a member of the 13th National Committee of the Chinese People's Political Consultative Conference.

== Early life and education ==
Dai was born in Huiyang Prefecture (now Huizhou, Guangdong), in December 1956. During the Down to the Countryside Movement, he was a sent-down youth in Huizhou West Lake Management Committee between 1973 and 1977. In that period, he joined the Chinese Communist Party (CCP) in September 1975. After resuming the college entrance examination in 1977, he was accepted to South China Normal University, where he majored in Chinese language and literature.

== Career ==
After graduation in 1980, Dai stayed for working.

Dai got involved in politics in August 1982, when he was assigned an official to the Shenzhen Municipal Committee of the Communist Youth League of China. Two years later, he became deputy secretary of the Shenzhen Municipal Working Committee of the Communist Youth League of China. He was a standing committee member of the Shenzhen Municipal Committee of the Communist Youth League of China and head of the Organization Department in November 1985 and subsequently secretary of the agency in October 1991.

In December 1992, Dai was made deputy party secretary of Longgang District, but having held the position for only two years, and served as secretary-general and director of the Office of the Shenzhen Municipal Committee of the Chinese People's Political Consultative Conference in May 1995. He was party secretary of Yantian District in February 1998, in addition to serving as chairperson of the Municipal People's Congress since June of the same year.

In February 2003, Dai was admitted to standing committee member of the CCP Shenzhen Municipal Committee, the city's top decision-making body, and appointed head of the Publicity Department. He was secretary-general and director of the Office in July 2003 and director of the Organization Department, director of the Editorial Office, and president of the Party School in May 2010. He was chosen as deputy party secretary of Shenzhen in December 2012, concurrently serving as director of the Municipal Social Work Commission since January 2013. In June 2015, he took office as chairperson of the Shenzhen Municipal Committee of the Chinese People's Political Consultative Conference, the provincial advisory body, and served until his retirement in September 2020.

== Investigation ==
On 15 December 2025, Dai was put under investigation for alleged "serious violations of discipline and laws" by the Central Commission for Discipline Inspection (CCDI), the party's internal disciplinary body, and the National Supervisory Commission, the highest anti-corruption agency of China. On 22 June 2026, Dai was expelled from the party.

Assembly seats
Preceded by Wang Suiming	Chairperson of the Shenzhen Municipal Committee of the Chinese People's Political Consultative Conference; 2015–2020	Succeeded by Lin Jie
