= Shenzhen Special Zone Daily =

Chinese Communist Party newspaper

- Native name: 深圳特区报
- Type: Daily newspaper; state media
- Owner: Shenzhen Press Group
- Publisher: Shenzhen Special Zone Daily Agency
- Founded: May 24, 1982
- Political alignment: Chinese Communist Party; Socialism with Chinese characteristics
- Language: Chinese
- Headquarters: Shenzhen
- Website: sztqb.sznews.com

Shenzhen Special Zone Daily (Chinese: 深圳特区报), also known as Shenzhen Tequ Bao or Shenzhen Special Zone Post or Shenzhen Special Economic Zone News or Shenzhen SEZ News, is a simplified Chinese newspaper published in the People's Republic of China.

The newspaper, launched on May 24, 1982, is the official organ of the Shenzhen Municipal Committee of the Chinese Communist Party.

== History ==
Shenzhen Special Zone Daily was inaugurated on May 24, 1982, and it is the first special zone newspaper in China.

On March 26, 1992, Shenzhen Special Zone Daily first published a long-form newsletter entitled "The East Wind Brings Spring all Around : An On-the-Spot Report on Comrade Deng Xiaoping in Shenzhen" (东方风来满眼春——邓小平同志在深圳纪实). This report had a tremendous impact on Chinese society as a whole, and is a landmark article in the history of the reform and opening up period.
