= Mayor of Shenzhen =

Mayor of the Shenzhen Municipal People's Government
- 深圳市人民政府市长
- National Emblem of China

- Flag of China
- Incumbent; Li Yun since 24 August 2026
- Shenzhen Municipal People's Government
- Style: Comrade
- Type: Mayor
- Status: Deputy provincial and ministerial-level official
- Reports to: Shenzhen Municipal People's Congress and its Standing Committee
- Seat: Fuzhong 3rd Road Civic Center Building, Futian, Shenzhen
- Appointer: Shenzhen Municipal People's Congress
- Inaugural holder: Jia Hua (Chairman of the Shenzhen Municipal Revolutionary Committee)
- Formation: 2 April 1979 (Chairman of the Shenzhen Municipal Revolutionary Committee)
- Deputy: Deputy Mayor

The mayor of Shenzhen, officially the Mayor of the Shenzhen Municipal People's Government, is the head of Shenzhen Municipality and leader of the Shenzhen Municipal People's Government.

The mayor is elected by the Shenzhen Municipal People's Congress, and responsible to it and its Standing Committee. The mayor is a deputy provincial level official and is responsible for the overall decision-making of the municipal government. The mayor is assisted by an executive vice mayor as well as several vice mayors. The mayor generally serves as the deputy secretary of the Shenzhen Municipal Committee of the Chinese Communist Party. The mayor the second-highest-ranking official in the city after the secretary of the CCP Shenzhen Committee. The current mayor is Li Yun, who began serving as acting mayor on 24 August 2026.

After the establishment of the Shenzhen Special Economic Zone, the first three mayors were all from Guangdong, including Wu Nansheng from Shantou, Liang Xiang from Kaiping, and Li Hao from Dianbai, Maoming. With the exception of Chen Rugui (whose native place was Lianjiang, Guangdong), all subsequent mayors of Shenzhen were from other provinces, with the largest number of people from Jiangsu, including Yu Youjun (Fengxian), Wang Rong (Binhai, acting), and Xu Qin (Lianyungang).

== History ==
The successive administrative heads of Shenzhen, Guangdong Province, include the Chairman of the Shenzhen Revolutionary Committee and the Mayor of Shenzhen Municipal People's Government. Shenzhen was relocated from the former Bao'an County on January 23, 1979, and was then under the dual leadership of Guangdong Province and Huiyang Prefecture. The State Council of China formally agreed to the relocation on March 5 of the same year. On April 2, the Huiyang Prefectural Committee appointed Jia Hua as the Deputy Secretary of the Shenzhen Municipal Committee of the Chinese Communist Party and the Chairman of the Shenzhen Revolutionary Committee, as the first administrative head of Shenzhen.

In November, Shenzhen was upgraded to a prefecture-level city, directly under the leadership of the Guangdong Provincial Revolutionary Committee. In March 1981, Shenzhen was upgraded to a sub-provincial city. In November, the State Council approved Shenzhen to be listed separately in the national plan and granted it economic management authority equivalent to that of the provincial level. In February 1992, the Standing Committee of the National People's Congress granted the Shenzhen Municipal People's Congress, its Standing Committee and the Municipal People's Government the power to formulate local laws and regulations.

== List of mayors ==
No.	Name	Native place	Took office	Left office	Ref.
1	Jia Hua	Rugao, Jiangsu	2 April 1979	12 June 1980	
2	Wu Nansheng	Shantou, Guangdong	12 June 1980	6 March 1981	
3	Liang Xiang	Kaiping, Guangdong	20 October 1981	12 August 1985	
4	Li Hao	Dianbai, Maoming, Guangdong	12 August 1985	22 May 1990	
5	Zheng Liangyu	Wuxing, Huzhou, Zhejiang	22 May 1990 (Appointed by the Guangdong Government); 27 December 1990 (Elected by the People's Congress)	17 November 1992	
6	Li Youwei	Xinmin, Liaoning	17 November 1992	23 May 1995	
7	Li Zibin	Huludao, Liaoning	23 May 1995	26 April 2000	
8	Yu Youjun	Feng, Jiangsu	17 June 2000 (acting from 26 April 2000)	17 June 2003	
9	Li Hongzhong	Changle, Shandong	28 February 2004 (acting from 17 June 2003)	2 June 2005	
10	Xu Zongheng	Xiangtan, Hunan	3 June 2005	12 June 2009	
Acting	Wang Rong	Binhai, Jiangsu	12 June 2009	5 June 2010	
11	Xu Qin	Lianyungang, Jiangsu	5 June 2010	20 July 2017	
12	Chen Rugui	Lianjiang, Guangdong	22 August 2017 (acting from 20 July 2017)	24 April 2021	
13	Qin Weizhong	Yulin, Guangxi	19 May 2021 (acting from 24 April 2021)	24 August 2026	
14	Li Yun	Songzi, Hubei	24 August 2026 (acting)	incumbent	
