= Shenzhen Media Group =

Chinese state media company

Shenzhen Media Group 深圳广播电影电视集团
- Logo of Shenzhen Media Group

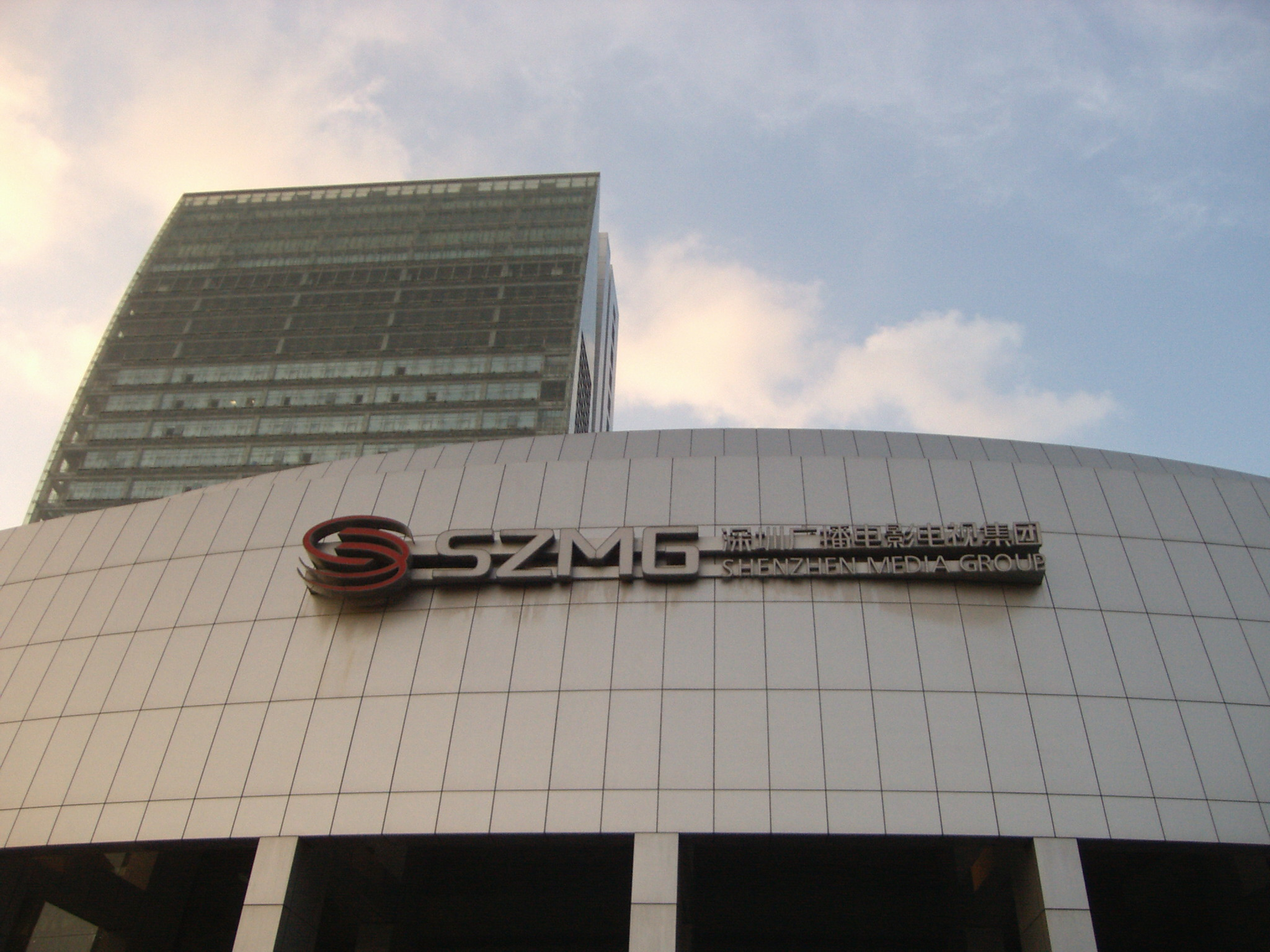
- Headquarters of Shenzhen Media Group
- Type: Terrestrial television; state media
- Country: China
- Founded: 28 June 2004; 21 years ago
- Owner: Propaganda Department of the Shenzhen Municipal Committee of the Chinese Communist Party
- Official website: www.szmg.com.cn

Shenzhen Media Group
- Simplified Chinese: 深圳广播电影电视集团
Transcriptions
Standard Mandarin
- Hanyu Pinyin: Shēnzhèn Guǎngbō Diànyǐng Diànshì Jítuán
Yue: Cantonese
- Jyutping: Sam^{1}zan^{3} Gwong^{2}bo^{3} Din^{6}jing^{2} Din^{6}si^{6} Zaap^{6}tyun^{4}

Shenzhen Media Group (SZMG) is a state media company based in Shenzhen, Guangdong province, China. It owns twelve TV channels and four radio stations which broadcast music, report news and Chinese talk shows. Shenzhen Media Group is controlled by the propaganda department of the Shenzhen Municipal Committee of the Chinese Communist Party.

== History ==
Before the establishment of the Shenzhen Special Economic Zone, Shenzhen had no local television station. Since Shenzhen is adjacent to Hong Kong, some people used Yagi-Uda antennas to receive Hong Kong channels. In May 1978, Baoan County (present-day Shenzhen City) set up a TV transmitting station at Wutong Mountain. Work was completed on 1 March 1980 and the 300-watt transmitter was used, on channel 10, to relay the programs of Guangdong Television, channel 2. The power was increased to 10 kilowatts on 1 October 1981.

After the establishment of the Shenzhen SEZ, the State Administration of Film, Radio and Television approved the creation of Shenzhen Television on 19 August 1982. Experimental broadcasts on channel 10 started on 1 January 1984. However, the broadcast of the Shenzhen Radio and Television University caused these experiments to adjust the airtime.

On 1 November the same year, regular broadcasts started with a transmitter imported from France broadcasting on UHF channel 33.

In July 2023, SZMG launched an international communication center. It also operates Zhinews or "Straight News" online.

Shenzhen Radio Station
- China
- Broadcast area: Shenzhen, China
- Frequencies: Internet, AM, and FM

Programming
- Format: various

Ownership
- Owner: Shenzhen Media Group

History
- First air date: 1984

Links
- Website: www.szr.com.cn

== South African holdings ==
In May 2009 South African fixed-line telephone operator Telkom said it had sold its majority stake in start-up broadcaster Telkom Media to the Shenzhen Group. The parties had been in negotiations since at least March 2008.
