= Xu Qin =

Chinese politician (born 1961)

- 许勤
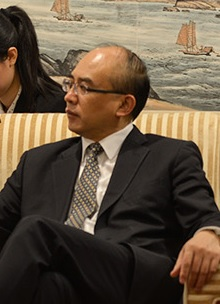
- Xu Qin in 2014

Party Secretary of Heilongjiang
- Incumbent
- Assumed office October 18, 2021
- Deputy: Hu Changsheng; Liang Huiling (governor)
- Preceded by: Zhang Qingwei

Governor of Hebei
- In office April 7, 2017 – October 22, 2021
- Leader: Zhao Kezhi→Wang Dongfeng (Party secretary)
- Preceded by: Zhang Qingwei
- Succeeded by: Wang Zhengpu

Party Secretary of Shenzhen
- In office December 30, 2016 – April 1, 2017
- Preceded by: Ma Xingrui
- Succeeded by: Wang Weizhong

Mayor of Shenzhen
- In office June 2010 – April 2017
- Preceded by: Wang Rong (acting)
- Succeeded by: Chen Rugui

Personal details
- Born: October 1961 (age 64) Lianyungang, Jiangsu, China
- Party: Chinese Communist Party
- Education: Beijing Institute of Technology; Guanghua School of Management; Hong Kong Polytechnic University

Chinese name
- Simplified Chinese: 许勤
- Traditional Chinese: 許勤
Transcriptions
Standard Mandarin
- Hanyu Pinyin: Xǔ Qín

Xu Qin (Chinese: 许勤; born October 1961) is a Chinese politician, and the current Party Secretary of Heilongjiang. Previously he had served as governor of Hebei, and before that, mayor, then Party Secretary of Shenzhen, China's most prominent special economic zone.

== Career ==
Xu Qin was born in Lianyungang, Jiangsu province, in 1961. He was admitted to the Beijing Institute of Technology in October 1978 to study photoelectric engineering. After graduating in 1982, he was assigned by the state to Factory 559 (later part of Norinco), a military contractor, to conduct scientific research with military applications. He returned to BIT two years later to study for a master's degree. In 1987, after obtaining his master's, he joined the National Planning Commission (the antecedent of the National Development and Reform Commission), embarking on a career as a public servant with technical skills.

Xu worked for the next twenty years in the economic planning system, supporting state-run industries related to electrical mechanics. In 2001, he entered the Guanghua School of Management to obtain an MBA. In 2003, he began overseeing high-tech planning as part of the National Development and Reform Commission. In 2004 he received a doctorate from the Hong Kong Polytechnic University.

In April 2008, he was transferred to the Special Economic Zone of Shenzhen to become executive vice mayor. In June 2010, he was named Mayor of Shenzhen. Xu was mayor during the 2015 Shenzhen landslide, an industrial accident later deemed to have been caused by human factors. He apologized on behalf of the government for the incident, bowing to the public to acknowledge his responsibility. On December 31, 2016, after Ma Xingrui was moved to the post of Governor of Guangdong, Xu was named party chief of Shenzhen. He served as party chief and mayor for a few months simultaneously.

In April 2017, Xu was transferred to Hebei as deputy party chief and governor-designate, duly was confirmed as Governor of Hebei by the provincial People's Congress on April 26, 2017. He will oversee the planning of the Xiong'an New Area and integration of the Beijing-Tianjin-Hebei economic area.

On October 18, 2021, he was transferred to northeast China's Heilongjiang province and appointed Chinese Communist Party Committee Secretary of Heilongjiang.

Party political offices
Preceded by Ma Xingrui	Party Secretary of Shenzhen; 2016–2017	Succeeded by Wang Weizhong
Preceded by Zhang Qingwei	Party Secretary of Heilongjiang; 2021–present	Incumbent
Assembly seats
Preceded by Zhang Qingwei	Chairman of Heilongjiang People's Congress; 2022–present	Incumbent
Government offices
Preceded by Wang Rong	Mayor of Shenzhen; 2010–2017	Succeeded by Chen Rugui
Preceded by Zhang Qingwei	Governor of Hebei; 2017–2021	Succeeded by Wang Zhengpu
