= Li Jinbin =

Chinese politician (born 1958)

- 李锦斌
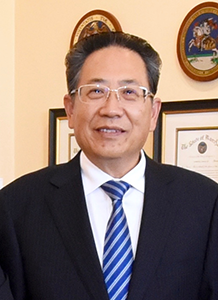
- Li in 2017

Party Secretary of Anhui
- In office 29 August 2016 – 30 September 2021
- Preceded by: Wang Xuejun
- Succeeded by: Zheng Shanjie

Chairman of the Standing Committee of Anhui Provincial People's Congress
- In office January 2017 – November 2021
- Preceded by: Wang Xuejun
- Succeeded by: Zheng Shanjie

Governor of Anhui
- In office 28 July 2015 – 1 September 2015
- Party Secretary: Wang Xuejun
- Preceded by: Wang Xuejun
- Succeeded by: Li Guoying

Personal details
- Born: February 1958 (age 68) Chengdu, Sichuan, China
- Party: Chinese Communist Party
- Education: Jilin University

Chinese name
- Simplified Chinese: 李锦斌
- Traditional Chinese: 李錦斌
Transcriptions
Standard Mandarin
- Hanyu Pinyin: Lǐ Jǐnbīn

Li Jinbin (Chinese: 李锦斌; born February 1958) is a Chinese politician who has served as the Chinese Communist Party Committee Secretary of Anhui from 2016 to 2021. Originally from Sichuan province, Li spent his early career in Jilin province. He was Vice Governor of Jilin from 2002 to 2007. He then worked briefly in Shaanxi before being transferred to Anhui to take on increasingly senior leadership roles.

== Biography ==
Li Jinbin was born in February 1958 in Chengdu, Sichuan province. He joined the work force in December 1974, and the Chinese Communist Party in September 1978. He has a doctoral degree in law.

Li spent much of his career in Jilin province in Northeast China. He worked at the education bureau of Jilin, before serving as Chinese Communist Party Deputy Committee Secretary of Changchun, the provincial capital. He later served as Mayor of Tonghua city and Party Chief of Liaoyuan city. He became Vice Governor of Jilin province in August 2002. From 2002 to 2007 he studied at the graduate school of Jilin University on a part-time basis.

In 2007, Li was appointed director of the Organization Department of the Shaanxi party committee. Beginning in 2013, Li experienced a series of rapid promotions. In April that year, he was appointed Deputy Party Secretary of Anhui province. On 8 June 2015, he became Acting Governor of Anhui, succeeding Wang Xuejun, who had been promoted to provincial party chief; he was confirmed as governor on July 28. Just over a year later, in August 2016, Li was elevated again to provincial party chief, again succeeding Wang Xuejun. Although it was considered conventional practice for a sitting governor to advance to the party chief position, the rapid pace of the promotions between 2013 and 2016 was notable.

On 23 October 2021, he was appointed vice chairperson of the National People's Congress Environment Protection and Resources Conservation Committee.

Government offices
Preceded by Wang Yuehao	Mayor of Tonghua; 1997–2001	Succeeded by Zhang Yong
Preceded by Wang Xuejun	Governor of Anhui; 2015–2016	Succeeded by Li Guoying
Party political offices
Preceded by Zhao Binghui	Party Secretary of Liaoyuan; 2001–2002	Succeeded by Zhao Zhenqi
Preceded by Yang Shiqiu	Head of Organization Department of CPC Shaanxi Provincial Committee; 2007–2013	Succeeded by Mao Wanchun
Preceded by Sun Jinlong	Deputy Party Secretary of Anhui; 2013–2015	Succeeded by Li Guoying
Preceded by Wang Xuejun	Party Secretary of Anhui; 2016–2021	Succeeded by Zheng Shanjie
Assembly seats
Preceded by Wang Xuejun	Chairman of the Standing Committee of Anhui Provincial People's Congress; 2017–2021	Succeeded by Zheng Shanjie
