= Shenzhen Municipal Committee of the Chinese People's Political Consultative Conference =

Local political advisory body

Shenzhen Municipal Committee of the Chinese People's Political Consultative Conference 中国人民政治协商会议深圳市委员会
- 7th Shenzhen Municipal Committee of the Chinese People's Political Consultative Conference
- Emblem of the Chinese People's Political Consultative Conference

Type
- Type: United front organ

History
- Founded: December 1990

Leadership
- Chairperson: Lin Jie, CCP

Structure
- Length of term: 5 years

Website
- www.szzx.gov.cn

Shenzhen Municipal Committee of the Chinese People's Political Consultative Conference
- Simplified Chinese: 中国人民政治协商会议深圳市委员会
- Traditional Chinese: 中國人民政治協商會議深圳市委員會
Transcriptions
Standard Mandarin
- Hanyu Pinyin: Zhōngguó Rénmín Zhèngzhì Xiéshāng Huìyì Shēnzhèn Shì Wěiyuánhuì

Short form
- Simplified Chinese: 政协深圳市委员会
- Traditional Chinese: 政協深圳市委員會
Transcriptions
Standard Mandarin
- Hanyu Pinyin: Zhèngxié Shēnzhènshì Wěiyuánhuì

Shortest form
- Simplified Chinese: 深圳市政协
- Traditional Chinese: 深圳市政協
Transcriptions
Standard Mandarin
- Hanyu Pinyin: Shēnzhènshì Zhèngxié

The Shenzhen Municipal Committee of the Chinese People's Political Consultative Conference is the local committee of the Chinese People's Political Consultative Conference in Shenzhen, China. it is supervised and directed by the Shenzhen Municipal Committee of the Chinese Communist Party.

== History ==
The Shenzhen Municipal Committee of the Chinese People's Political Consultative Conference was established in December 1990.

== Structure ==
The Shenzhen Municipal Committee has the following structure:

- General Office
  - Secretariat
  - Personnel Department
  - Research Office (General Office)
  - Administrative Reception
  - Publicity and Information Department
- Proposal Committee
- Economic Committee
- Population, Resources and Environment Committee
- Science, Education, Health and Sports Committee
- Social Law and Ethnic and Religious Affairs Commission
- Hong Kong, Macao, Taiwan, Overseas Chinese and Foreign Affairs Committee
- Cultural History and Learning Committee
- Contact Working Committee

== List of chairpersons ==
- Zhou Xiwu (December 1990-May 1995)
- Lin Zuji (May 1995 - June 2000)
- Li Ronggen (June 2000-March 2002)
- Li Decheng (March 2002-April 2008)
- Wang Shunsheng (April 2008-May 2010)
- Bai Tian (May 2010-January 2013)
- Wang Suiming (January 2013 - May 2015)
- Dai Beifang (May 2015-September 2020)
- Lin Jie (September 2020-)
