= Wang Jinshan =

Chinese politician (1945–2026)

Wang Jinshan (simplified Chinese: 王金山; traditional Chinese: 王金山; Hanyu Pinyin: Wáng Jīnshān; 1945 – 9 March 2026) was a Chinese politician. He served as Governor of Anhui province from 2003 to 2007, and Party Secretary, the top political position in the province, from 2007 to 2010. He was a native of Gongzhuling, Jilin province. He graduated from Siping Normal School in Siping City.

Wang Jinshan died on 9 March 2026, at the age of 81.

Political offices
Preceded by Guo Jinlong	Party Secretary of Anhui; 2007–2010	Succeeded by Zhang Baoshun
Preceded by Xu Zhonglin	Governor of Anhui; 2003–2007	Succeeded by Wang Sanyun
