= Wang Xuejun =

Chinese politician

- 王学军

Party Secretary of Anhui
- In office 1 June 2015 – 29 August 2016
- Preceded by: Zhang Baoshun
- Succeeded by: Li Jinbin

Governor of Anhui
- In office 20 June 2013 – 8 June 2015
- Preceded by: Li Bin
- Succeeded by: Li Jinbin

Director of the National Bureau of Letters and Calls
- In office 13 February 2004 – 26 March 2013
- Preceded by: Zhou Zhanshun
- Succeeded by: Shu Xiaoqin

Personal details
- Born: December 1952 (age 73) Nanpi County, Hebei, China
- Party: Chinese Communist Party
- Education: Hebei University of Technology

Wang Xuejun (simplified Chinese: 王学军; traditional Chinese: 王學軍; Hanyu Pinyin: Wáng Xuéjūn; born December 1952) is a Chinese politician and former senior regional official. He served as the governor of Anhui from 2013 to 2015, then was promoted to Party Secretary of Anhui, a position he held from 2015 to 2016.

== Career ==
Wang Xuejun is a native of Nanpi County, Hebei province. He joined the Chinese Communist Party in July 1975. He is a graduate of Hebei Institute of Technology (now Hebei University of Technology). He began work as a regular factory worker. He climbed the ranks in Cangzhou, Hebei, eventually rising to become the city's vice mayor. He then served as party chief of Langfang. He worked in his native Hebei until 2004. From 2004 to 2013 he was transferred to Beijing to head the State Bureau for Letters and Calls, the agency in charge of processing petitions from ordinary citizens.

In March 2013 Wang was transferred to Anhui province to become its acting governor, replacing Li Bin, who was appointed chairperson of the newly formed National Health and Family Planning Commission. Wang Xuejun has been a full member of the 17th and the 18th Central Committees of the Chinese Communist Party.

On June 1, 2015, Wang replaced Zhang Baoshun, who had reached retirement age, as the Party Secretary of Anhui province. Wang's term as party chief was brief. He was relieved of the post just over one year later, on August 29, 2016. He left frontline politics and joined the National People's Congress Education, Science, Culture and Public Health Committee as a deputy chair.

Political offices
Preceded by Li Bin	Governor of Anhui; 2013–2015	Succeeded by Li Jinbin
Party political offices
Preceded by Zhang Baoshun	Party Secretary of Anhui; 2015–2016	Succeeded by Li Jinbin
