= Yu Youjun =

Chinese politician (born 1953)

- 于幼军

Governor of Shanxi
- In office 9 July 2005 – 3 September 2007
- Party Secretary: Zhang Baoshun
- Preceded by: Zhang Baoshun
- Succeeded by: Meng Xuenong

Vice Governor of Hunan
- In office 10 June 2003 – 30 July 2005
- Governor: Zhou Bohua

Mayor of Shenzhen
- In office 26 April 2000 – 17 June 2003
- Party Secretary: Zhang Gaoli; Huang Liman
- Preceded by: Li Zibin
- Succeeded by: Li Hongzhong

Head of the Publicity Department of the Guangdong Provincial Committee of the Chinese Communist Party
- In office March 1993 – June 2000
- Preceded by: Huang Hao
- Succeeded by: Zhong Yangsheng

Personal details
- Born: January 1953 (age 73) Feng County, Jiangsu, China
- Party: Chinese Communist Party
- Education: Sun Yat-Sen University
- Occupation: Politician

Yu Youjun (simplified Chinese: 于幼军; traditional Chinese: 于幼軍; pinyin: Yú Yòujūn; born January 1953) is a Chinese politician. Among other positions, he was once the Mayor of Shenzhen, Executive Vice-Governor of Hunan province, and Governor of Shanxi. He resigned as Shanxi governor in 2007 and then transferred to serve as Party Branch Secretary and Vice Minister of Culture.

In October 2008, Yu was unexpectedly removed from the 17th Central Committee of the Chinese Communist Party (CCP) and his party membership was put on probation for two years, a disciplinary measure that is considered to be just short of expulsion. He eventually re-joined government as a deputy director of the Office of the South-to-North Water Diversion Project of the State Council. He retired in 2015, and joined the faculty of his alma mater, Sun Yat-Sen University as a full-time professor.

== Political career ==
A native of Feng County in Jiangsu, Yu holds a doctorate in philosophy. He joined the CCP in June 1976. Working in Guangdong province, he eventually served as the party secretaries of various districts in the city of Guangzhou. From 1994 to 2000, he was a member of the provincial Party Standing Committee and concurrently head of the provincial party organization's Publicity Department, holding a sub-provincial level office.

Yu came to prominence as Mayor of Shenzhen, China's first and arguably most successful Special Economic Zone (SEZ), from 1999 to 2003. In November 2002, an 18,000-character essay "Shenzhen, who has abandoned you?" published online by a netizen 'Crazy for her' (wǒwèiyīkuáng) attracted much attention for its comprehensive and data-rich examination of various public policies pertaining to the SEZ and the implications of extending them to other parts of the country. Mayor Yu met with the author of the essay Guo Zhongxiao (呙中校) on January 19, 2003, to discuss his essay and exchange views on Shenzhen and its development. His act was hailed in various media as a great step forward in boosting communication and dialog between high officials and Internet users.

Yu was promoted to Vice Governor of Hunan province and deputy secretary of the Hunan Provincial Party Committee in June 2003. In 2005 he was promoted again to become governor of the coal-rich province of Shanxi. During his time in Shanxi, he undertook several key initiatives including the closure of several thousand illegal coal mines and the improvement of the environment. Yu was also known for attracting investment into the province, which was credited with fostering the province's explosive economic growth. Yu came onto the international spotlight following the 2007 Chinese slave scandal involving children and migrant workers who were forced to work in kilns located in Shanxi province. He publicly apologized for the mishap and offered a self-criticism, an act virtually unheard of in Chinese politics. Yu resigned as governor in September 2007, and was succeeded by Meng Xuenong.

As part of a wider Party reshuffle in preparation for the formation of the new Cabinet in 2008, Yu resigned his party and government positions in Shanxi in September and October 2007 respectively. He was then appointed the party secretary and Vice Minister of the Ministry of Culture. Yu was chosen as a member of the 17th Central Committee of the Chinese Communist Party in 2007.

== Departure from politics ==
Following his assumption of the position of party secretary, Yu Youjun was unexpectedly passed over for promotion to Minister of Culture in the March 2008 Cabinet reshuffle. However, eventually the post went to Cai Wu. In October 2008, during the Third Plenary Session of the 17th CCP Central Committee, the Central Commission for Discipline Inspection submitted a report on disciplinary offenses committed by Yu, which was approved by the party rank-and-file. Yu was then removed him from the Central Committee; his party membership was also subject to a two-year probationary period. No details on Yu's apparent impropriety were officially confirmed or released, but Hong Kong media speculated that this may have been related to political maneuvering at the Ministerial level.

Probation implied that Yu had lost many of his rights as a senior party member including the right to vote for party representatives and the right to stand for party offices. However, according to party rules he could be restored as a full member should he show "remorse" for his actions. He was the only member of the 17th Central Committee to have been given this treatment, which also led to widespread belief that his removal was politically motivated. During his probation, Yu took the time to write two books, one focused on Chinese history from 1919 to 1965, trying to piece together an accurate account of historical events during that time period; the other was entitled The 500 Year History of Socialism. The books were well received and awarded several state awards.

== South-North Water Diversion Project ==
Yu was officially restored to a government post in February 2011 when he was appointed as deputy director of the Office of South-North Water Transfer Project. This project is widely acknowledged to be largest and most ambitious water diversion project in history, with a budget several times that of the Three Gorges Dam. This indicated that he had re-gained favour and his case was not serious. After taking on the post, Yu routinely inspected and directed work, and helped to complete the East and Middle segments of the massive project.

In January 2015, Yu retired from his government post due to reaching of the mandatory retirement age. State media cited that Yu was the oldest member of the leadership team of the Water Diversion Project. Upon retirement, Yu joined the faculty of his alma mater, Sun Yat-Sen University in Guangdong Province.

Political offices
| Preceded by Zhang Baoshun | Governor of Shanxi; 2005–2007 | Succeeded by Meng Xuenong |
| Preceded by Sun Jiazheng | Secretary of the Leading Party Group of the Ministry of Culture; 2007–2008 | Succeeded by Cai Wu |
