= Shenzhen Daily =

Chinese Communist Party newspaper

- Type: Daily newspaper; state media
- Format: Compact
- Owner: Shenzhen Press Group
- Publisher: Shenzhen Press Group
- Founded: July 1, 1997
- Language: Chinese, English
- Headquarters: 21 Shangbao Building, Futian District, Shenzhen, China
- Circulation: 100,000
- Website: www.szdaily.com szdaily.sznews.com

Shenzhen Daily
- Simplified Chinese: 深圳日报
- Traditional Chinese: 深圳日報
Transcriptions
Standard Mandarin
- Hanyu Pinyin: Shēnzhèn Rìbào
Yue: Cantonese
- Jyutping: sam1 zan3 jat6 bou3

Shenzhen Daily is an English-language newspaper published in Shenzhen.

== History ==
Shenzhen Daily began publication in 1997 as a sister newspaper to its Chinese-language counterpart. It is currently the only English-language daily newspaper in southern mainland China.
