= Zhang Xinqi =

Chinese politician

- 张新起

Vice Chairman of Shandong People's Congress
- In office February 2017 – January 2018
- Chairman: Jiang Yikang; Liu Jiayi

Mayor of Qingdao
- In office March 2012 – February 2017
- Preceded by: Xia Geng
- Succeeded by: Meng Fanli

Communist Party Secretary of Weifang
- In office September 2006 – December 2011
- Preceded by: Zhang Chuanlin
- Succeeded by: Xu Liquan

Mayor of Weifang
- In office December 2002 – September 2006
- Preceded by: Wang Boxiang
- Succeeded by: Xu Liquan

Personal details
- Born: August 1956 (age 70) Rongcheng, Shandong, China
- Party: Chinese Communist Party (1977–2021; expelled)
- Education: Ludong University; Central Party School of the Chinese Communist Party

Chinese name
- Traditional Chinese: 張新起
- Simplified Chinese: 张新起
Transcriptions
Standard Mandarin
- Hanyu Pinyin: Zhāng Xīnqǐ

Zhang Xinqi (Chinese: 张新起; born August 1956) is a retired Chinese politician who spent his entire career in his home-province Shandong. He was investigated by China's top anti-graft agency in February 2021. He is the second vice ministerial-level official in Shandong to be targeted by China's top anticorruption watchdog since the 19th National Congress of the Chinese Communist Party in October 2017, after Ji Xiangqi, former vice governor of Shandong. He is also the second high-level official caught in the year of the ox, after Wang Fuyu, former chairman of the Guizhou Provincial Committee of the Chinese People's Political Consultative Conference.

Born and raised in Rongcheng, Shandong, he worked in government after college. During the late Cultural Revolution, he worked as a sent-down youth for more than a year. He joined the Chinese Communist Party in March 1977. He served as mayor of Qingdao from 2012 to 2017, and mayor and party chief of Weifang from 2002 to 2011. At the height of his political career, he was vice chairman of Shandong People's Congress.

He was a delegate to the 10th and 12th National People's Congress.

== Early life and education ==
Zhang was born in Rongcheng, Shandong, in August 1956. During the late Cultural Revolution, in July 1974, he was a sent-down youth in his home-county. In November 1975, he joined the local aquatic products supply and marketing company as a statistician. In November 1978, he was admitted to Yantai Normal School (now Ludong University), where he majored in Chinese.

== Career ==
After graduating in July 1980, he was dispatched to Yantai Construction Company, where he eventually became its deputy party chief and deputy manager in December 1985. In February 1989, he was appointed deputy director of the newly established Yantai Construction Committee, and held that office until October 1992, when he rose to become party branch secretary and director of Yantai Planning Bureau. In September 1994, he was transferred to Laizhou, a county-level city under the jurisdiction of Yantai, and appointed mayor and party branch secretary. In December 1997, he was appointed party chief of Laizhou and was admitted to member of the standing committee of the CPC Yantai Municipal Committee, the city's top authority. During his time as mayor of Laizhou, he supervised the construction of 7 garden parks, more than 20 street green spaces and a 10-kilometre (6.2 mi) green belt around the city, with an urban coverage rate of 40%. Laizhou was rated as a National Environmental Protection Model City (全国环保模范城市) by the State Environmental Protection Administration in 2000.

In January 2001 he became deputy communist party secretary and vice mayor of the neighbouring Weifang city, rising to mayor in February 2003 and party chief in September 2006. During his tenure, Weifang started the construction of ecological city in an all-round way, carried out the greening construction of "Ten Major Projects and One Hundred Projects" (十大工程百个项目), and was named "National Garden City" (国家园林城市) by the Ministry of Housing and Urban-Rural Development in 2010.

=== Mayor of Qingdao ===
In December 2011, he was transferred to the coastal city Qingdao and appointed deputy party chief, concurrently holding the mayor position since March 2012.

On February 27, 2012, Qingdao government issued the "Circular on carrying out afforestation and greening in the whole city" (关于在全市开展植树增绿大行动的通告), which planned to invest more than 4 billion yuan in afforestation that year, and put forward the goal of creating a "National Forest City" (国家森林城市). In 2011, the local financial revenue of Qingdao was 56.6 billion yuan, and the afforestation project accounted for 7.2% of the financial revenue of Qingdao. Such a large-scale afforestation project with huge cost had aroused the doubts of the local people. On April 19, vice mayor Wang Jianxiang (王建祥) apologized for the lack of work in online communication with netizens and promised to adjust the existing problems. On April 20, Qingdao Morning Post (青岛早报), the mouthpiece of Qingdao government, criticized the people of Qingdao for "complacent, self-sufficient, selfish, self complaining, self abandoning and self talking" (自满自足，自私自利，自怨自弃，自说自话) in the form of big character on the front page of 3/4 area. At the same time, in the news guide at the lower right corner, there is news that "4 billion yuan planting trees is false news" (40亿种树费子虚乌有). On April 27, when listening to the work report of the Bureau of Parks and Woods, Zhang said, "if there are some dissatisfied problems in the work of afforestation, I should first make self-criticism." Zhang was nicknamed "Tree Planting Mayor" (种树市长) by the local people after the afforestation project.

On November 22, 2013, 62 people were killed and 136 injured in the explosion caused by the crude oil leakage, resulting in a direct economic loss of 750 million yuan. On January 10, 2014, Zhang was given an administrative warning. During his term in office, he also undertook major improvements to the city's tourism. An overcharging customers drew the attention all over the country and seriously affected the image of Qingdao as a tourist city. On October 4, 2015, when a tourist ordered in Qingdao, a 38 yuan dish of prawns became 38 yuan each when he checked out, and the dish of prawns cost more than 1,500 yuan. After the tourists called the police he still spent more than 1,300 yuan.

In February 2017, he became vice chairman of Shandong People's Congress, serving in the post until his retirement in January 2018.

== Downfall ==
On February 23, 2021, he has come under investigation for "serious violations of discipline and laws" by the Central Commission for Discipline Inspection (CCDI), the party's internal disciplinary body, and the National Supervisory Commission, the highest anti-corruption agency of China. On August 17, he was expelled from the Chinese Communist Party (CCP) and dismissed from public office. On August 30, he has been arrested on suspicion of taking bribes as per a decision made by the Supreme People's Procuratorate. On November 1, he was indicted on suspicion of accepting bribes.

On February 20, 2023, Zhang was sentenced to life in prison for taking 155 million yuan in bribes.

Government offices
Preceded by Xu Liquan	Mayor of Weifang; 2002–2006	Succeeded by Zhang Xinqi
Preceded by Xia Geng	Mayor of Qingdao; 2012–2017	Succeeded by Meng Fanli
Party political offices
Preceded by Zhang Chuanlin	Communist Party Secretary of Weifang; 2006–2011	Succeeded by Xu Liquan
