= Party Secretary of Anhui =

Provincial government position in China

Secretary of the Anhui Provincial Committee of the Chinese Communist Party
- 中国共产党安徽省委员会书记
- Emblem of the Chinese Communist Party

- Flag of the Chinese Communist Party

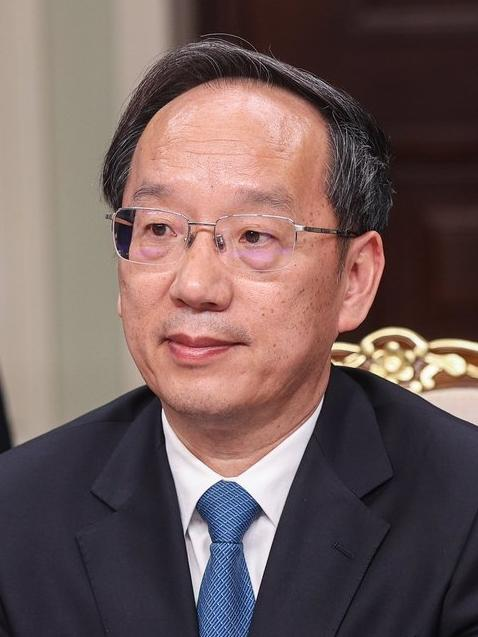
- Incumbent; Li Lecheng since 23 September 2026
- Anhui Provincial Committee of the Chinese Communist Party
- Type: Party Committee Secretary
- Status: Provincial and ministerial-level official
- Member of: Anhui Provincial Standing Committee
- Nominator: Central Committee
- Appointer: Anhui Provincial Committee Central Committee
- Inaugural holder: Zeng Xisheng
- Formation: January 1952
- Deputy: Deputy Secretary; Secretary-General

The secretary of the Anhui Provincial Committee of the Chinese Communist Party is the leader of the Anhui Provincial Committee of the Chinese Communist Party (CCP). As the CCP is the sole ruling party of the People's Republic of China (PRC), the secretary is the highest ranking post in Anhui.

The secretary is officially appointed by the CCP Central Committee based on the recommendation of the CCP Organization Department, which is then approved by the Politburo and its Standing Committee. The secretary can be also appointed by a plenary meeting of the Anhui Provincial Committee, but the candidate must be the same as the one approved by the central government. The secretary leads the Standing Committee of the Anhui Provincial Committee, and is usually a member of the CCP Central Committee. The secretary leads the work of the Provincial Committee and its Standing Committee. The secretary is outranks the governor, who is generally the deputy secretary of the committee.

The current secretary is Li Lecheng, who took office on 23 September 2026.

== List of party secretaries ==
Image	Name (English)	Name (Chinese)	Term start	Term end	Ref.
	Zeng Xisheng	曾希圣	January 1952	February 1962	
	Li Baohua	李葆华	February 1962	January 1967	
	Li Desheng	李德生	November 1969	December 1974	
	Song Peizhang	宋佩璋	May 1975	June 1977	
	Wan Li	万里	June 1977	March 1980	
	Zhang Jingfu	张劲夫	March 1980	April 1982	
	Zhou Zijian	周子健	April 1982	March 1983	
	Huang Huang	黄璜	March 1983	April 1986	
	Li Guixian	李贵鲜	April 1986	April 1988	
	Lu Rongjing	卢荣景	April 1988	September 1998	
	Hui Liangyu	回良玉	11 September 1998	31 October 2001	
	Wang Taihua	王太华	31 October 2001	16 December 2004	
	Guo Jinlong	郭金龙	16 December 2004	1 December 2007	
	Wang Jinshan	王金山	1 December 2007	31 May 2010	
	Zhang Baoshun	张宝顺	31 May 2010	1 June 2015	
	Wang Xuejun	王学军	1 June 2015	29 August 2016	
	Li Jinbin	李锦斌	29 August 2016	30 September 2021	
	Zheng Shanjie	郑栅洁	30 September 2021	14 March 2023	
	Han Jun	韩俊	14 March 2023	28 June 2024	
	Liang Yanshun	梁言顺	28 June 2024	23 September 2026	
	Li Lecheng	李乐成	23 September 2026	Incumbent	
