= Ma Xingrui =

Chinese politician (born 1959)

- 马兴瑞
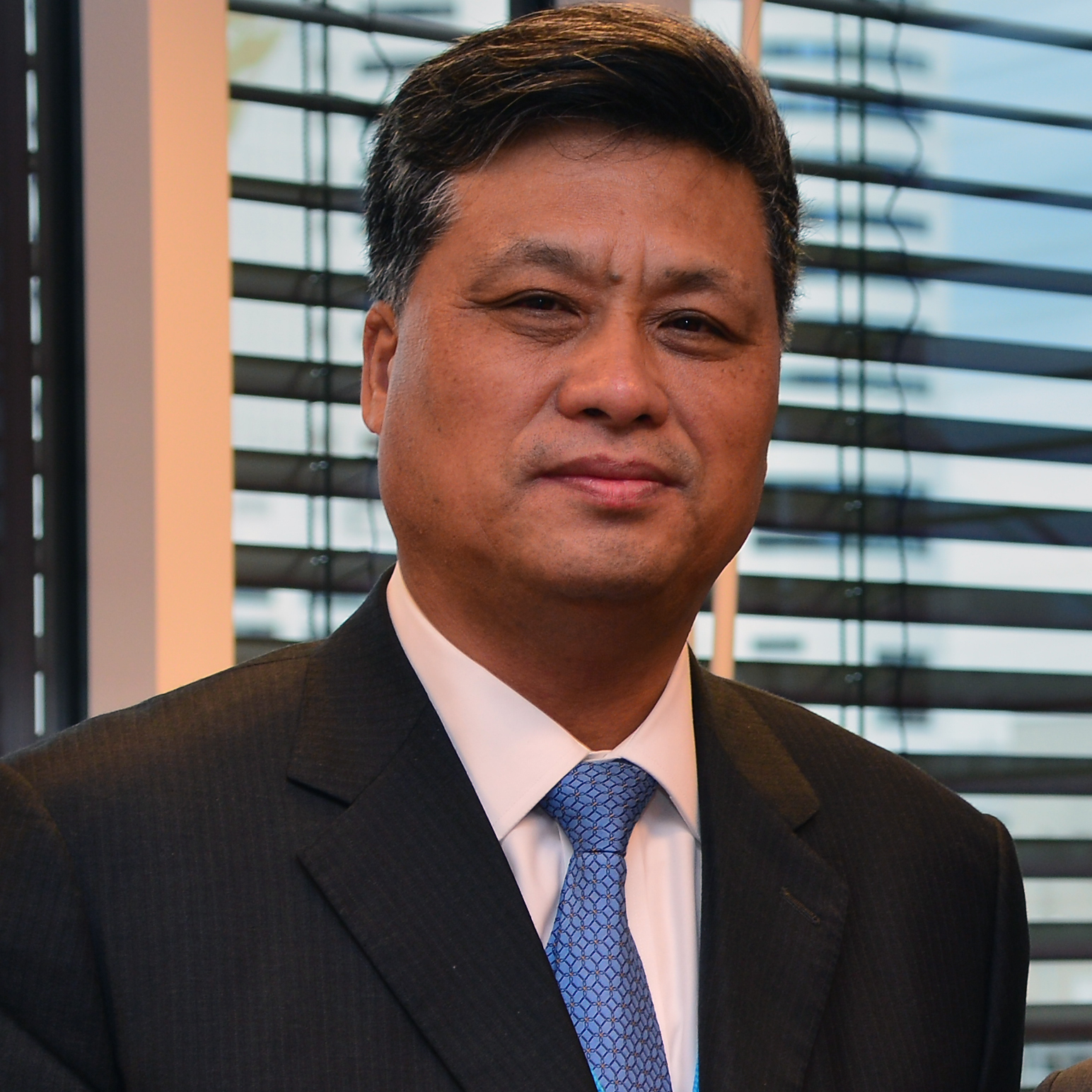
- Ma in 2013

Party Secretary of Xinjiang
- In office 25 December 2021 – 1 July 2025
- Deputy: Erkin Tuniyaz (chairman)
- General secretary: Xi Jinping
- Preceded by: Chen Quanguo
- Succeeded by: Chen Xiaojiang

Governor of Guangdong
- In office 30 December 2016 – 25 December 2021
- Leader: Hu Chunhua (2016–2017); Li Xi (2017 onwards)
- Preceded by: Zhu Xiaodan
- Succeeded by: Wang Weizhong

Party Secretary of Shenzhen
- In office 26 March 2015 – 30 December 2016
- Deputy: Xu Qin (mayor)
- Preceded by: Wang Rong
- Succeeded by: Xu Qin

Director of the China National Space Administration
- In office March 2013 – November 2013
- Preceded by: Chen Qiufa
- Succeeded by: Xu Dazhe

Personal details
- Born: October 1959 (age 67) Shuangyashan, Heilongjiang, China
- Party: Chinese Communist Party (1988–2026, expelled)
- Education: Liaoning Technical University; Tianjin University; Harbin Institute of Technology

Chinese name
- Simplified Chinese: 马兴瑞
- Traditional Chinese: 馬興瑞
Transcriptions
Standard Mandarin
- Hanyu Pinyin: Mǎ Xīngruì
Yue: Cantonese
- Jyutping: Maa5 Hing3-seoi6

Ma Xingrui (Chinese: 马兴瑞; born October 1959) is a Chinese former politician and aerospace engineer who was a member of the Politburo of the Chinese Communist Party from 2022 to 2026. He served as the Party Secretary of Xinjiang from 2021 to 2025.

Ma served as vice president of Harbin Institute of Technology, general manager of China Aerospace Science and Technology Corporation, director of the China National Space Administration, and chief commander of Chang'e 3, China's first lunar exploration mission. He later served as vice minister of industry and information technology, head of the Political and Legal Affairs Commission of Guangdong, Party Secretary of Shenzhen, Deputy Party Secretary of Guangdong, and Governor of Guangdong. Ma became the Party secretary of Xinjiang in December 2021 and a member of the Politburo in October 2022. His tenure saw a relative easing of security policies in Xinjiang and more focus on economic development. He was succeeded by Chen Xiaojiang in July 2025.

In April 2026, it was announced that Ma was under investigation for "serious violation of law and discipline" by the Central Commission for Discipline Inspection (CCDI). On 14 July 2026, Ma was expelled from the Chinese Communist Party and removed from public positions, pending a final verdict from the court. On 29 October 2026, the CCP Central Committee approved the CCDI report on Ma and confirmed the Politburo decision to expel him from the CCP. On 5 November 2026, the Supreme People's Procuratorate announced that Ma was indicted on charges of bribery.

== Education and academic career ==
Ma Xingrui was born on 6 October 1959 in Shuangyashan, Heilongjiang province, to a family of mine workers in China's industrial northeast. His branch of the family migrated from Yuncheng County, Shandong to Shuangyashan in the 1930s during his grandfather's generation. His father and two older brothers were all miners in Shuangyashan Mining Bureau.

After the college entrance examination was reinstated, Ma was admitted to the Department of Mechanical and Electrical Engineering of Fuxin Mining Institute (now Liaoning Technical University), majoring in engineering mechanics in October 1977. Most of the majors he originally applied for were related to coal. However, Fuxin Mining Institute established the major of Engineering Mechanics in 1977, and Ma was selected into the engineering mechanics class because of his excellent grades in mathematics, physics and chemistry. Ma received a bachelor's degree at Fuxin Mining Institute in 1982, and went on to graduate school for general mechanics at the Department of Mechanics of Tianjin University in July 1982. His master's supervisor was Li Li. From March 1985 to March 1988, he studied for a doctoral degree in mechanics at the Flight Dynamics Research Laboratory of Harbin Institute of Technology (HIT) in 1985. His doctoral supervisor, Huang Wenhu, had just stepped down as president of Harbin Institute of Technology and later became an academician of the Chinese Academy of Engineering. Ma joined the Chinese Communist Party (CCP) in January 1988.

After receiving his doctorate in March 1988, he stayed at HIT to pursue post-doctoral work, first working as an instructor and associate professor, as well as the deputy director of the Department of Space Science and Technology, deputy director and director of the Department of Aerospace Engineering and Mechanics at HIT. In 1991, Ma was awarded the title of "Chinese Doctoral Degree Recipient with Outstanding Contributions" by the State Education Commission and was appointed as a professor by the university in December 1991. In April 1992 he became dean of the school of mechanics at the institute. In 1994, he was selected for the "Trans-Century Outstanding Talents Program" of the State Education Commission and received a special government allowance from the State Council. In February 1995, he became the vice dean of the School of Aerospace and was elected as a member of the 8th National Youth Federation. In April 1996 he was named vice president of the institute and was named "National Outstanding Young and Middle-aged Expert".

== Aerospace industry ==
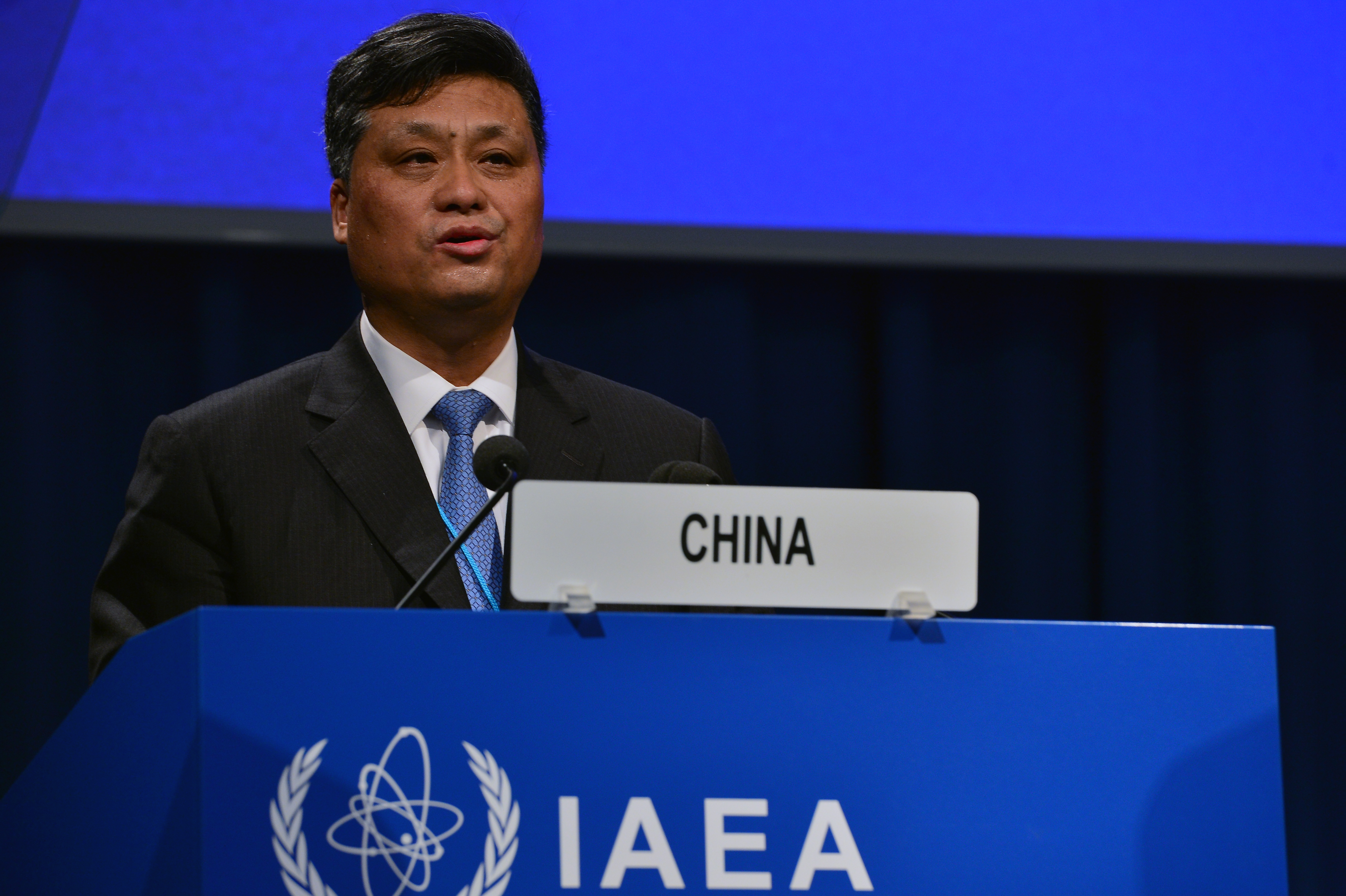
Ma as chairperson of China Atomic Energy Authority (CAEA) speaking at the IAEA General Conference in Vienna (2013)

In May 1996, Ma was appointed vice dean of China Academy of Space Technology (CAST), and became the chief commander and chief designer of the Shijian 5 satellite project in June 1996. In 1999, he was appointed as the head of the Satellite System Technology Professional Group of the General Armaments Department. In September 1999, he was named member of the CCP Committee and deputy general manager of China Aerospace Science and Technology Corporation (CASC).

In 2000, he was appointed as a part-time member of the Science and Technology Committee of the General Armament Department. In 2003, he was appointed as a member of the Academic Degrees Committee of the State Council as a member of the Academic Evaluation Group of Aeronautical and Astronautics Science and Technology. In December 2003, he was additionally appointed Chairman of the Sino Satellite Communications and worked on various lunar missions. In 2004, he was elected as Vice Chairman of the Chinese Society of Astronautics. From March 2004 to December 2005, he also served as Deputy Chief Commander of the Lunar Exploration Project. In July 2006, he also served as Chairman of the Board of Directors of China Aerospace Science and Technology International Corporation, Director of the Management Committee of Shanghai Aerospace Science and Technology Industrial Base, and Chairman of Shanghai Aerospace Science and Technology Industrial Base Development and Construction.

In 2007, Ma was elected as an Academician of the International Academy of Astronautics. In September 2007, he was promoted to Party Secretary and General Manager of CASC. In October 2007, he became the Chairman of the Chinese Society of Astronautics. In November 2007, he was appointed as the Deputy Chief Commander of China's Manned Space Program. In December 2008, he became the Chief Commander of China's New Generation Carrier Rocket Program. On 28 April 2011, at the 6th National Congress of Members of the Chinese Society of Astronautics, he was elected as the Chairman of the 6th Council. In 2012, he was elected as a delegate to the 18th National Congress of the Chinese Communist Party and a member of the Presidium, and was subsequently elected as a full member of the 18th Central Committee of the Chinese Communist Party by the Congress. In March 2013, Ma was appointed Director of the China National Space Administration, Director of the China Atomic Energy Authority, Director of the State Administration of Science, Technology and Industry for National Defense, and Vice Minister of Industry and Information Technology. He was also elected as the Chairman of the Council of the Asia-Pacific Space Cooperation Organization in 2013. He was the chief commander of the successful Chang'e 3 mission, China's first lunar surface exploration.

== Political career ==
=== Guangdong ===
In November 2013, Ma left his posts in science and was transferred to Guangdong to serve as deputy party secretary of the province and concurrently the secretary of the provincial Political and Legal Affairs Commission. In March 2015, he was named Party Secretary of Shenzhen, replacing Wang Rong. Ma's appointment in Shenzhen placed him in his first executive party leadership role. His appointment also elevated the status of the office, given that his predecessor Wang is only an alternate member of the Central Committee, while Ma is a full member. In late 2015, Ma gave Shenzhen's three largest bus operators – Shenzhen Bus Group, Shenzhen Eastern Bus Company and Shenzhen Western Bus Company – a three-year deadline to establish all-electric fleets. In October 2016, he announced Shenzhen would transfer the ownership the Lok Ma Chau Loop to Hong Kong with the intention to develop it with Hong Kong.

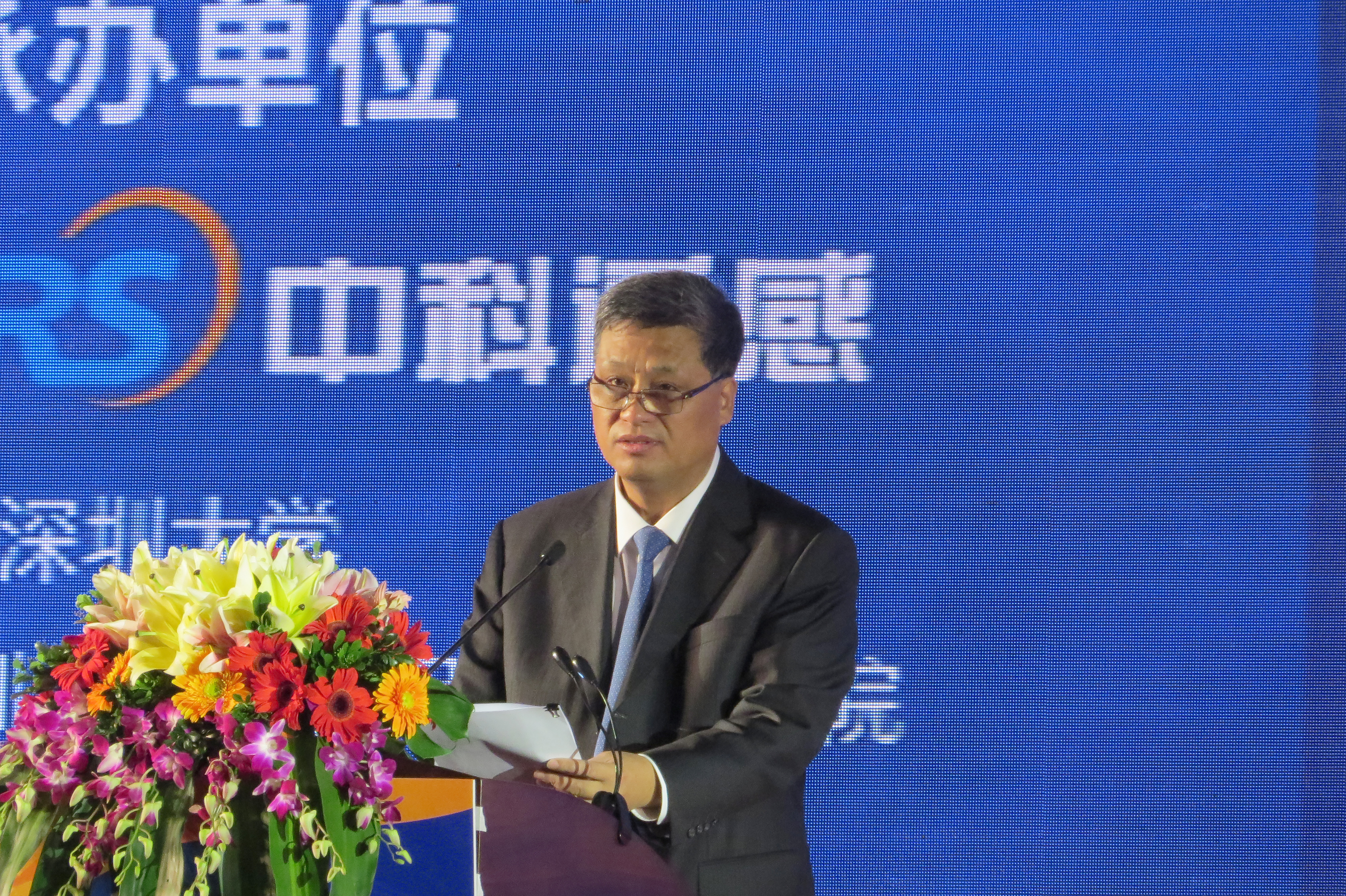
Ma speaking at the 20th Conference on Remote Sensing of China in Shenzhen (2016)

In December 2016, Ma was appointed as the acting Governor of Guangdong. In a break with tradition, Ma became the first governor in over 30 years not native to the province. Ma was elected as the Governor of Guangdong on 23 January 2017. In March 2017, while meeting the Guangdong provincial delegation at the National People's Congress, Ma said he hoped the Greater Bay Area would "compete with bay areas in Los Angeles, New York and Tokyo Bay". He called on cooperation on a wide range of social and economic policies between the cities of the Greater Bay Area and said the Guangdong provincial government asked the China Center for International Economic Exchanges to study the Greater Bay Area initiative.

In January 2017, he was elected as a deputy to the 12th National People's Congress. In October 2017, Ma was elected as a full member of the 19th Central Committee of the Chinese Communist Party. In November 2017, Ma and Hong Kong Chief Executive Carrie Lam signed a deal to house a facility for Hong Kong and mainland Chinese law enforcement at the West Kowloon terminus of the Guangzhou–Shenzhen–Hong Kong Express Rail Link. On 24 February 2018, he was elected as a deputy to the 13th National People's Congress. During his tenure as governor, in August 2018, 14 companies from Singapore signed agreements with Guangdong companies to collaborate in research and development, technology, smart cities development, transport and logistics, education, biomedical sciences and professional services. In September 2021, Ma became the co-head of the Hengqin Management Committee along with Macau Chief Executive Ho Iat-seng.

=== Xinjiang ===
In December 2021, Ma was appointed the Party Secretary of Xinjiang. During his first tour of Ürümqi, he said the region should focus on modernizing Xinjiang's supply chains and improving the international business environment. In January 2022, during the local "Two Sessions" meeting in Xinjiang, Ma called for upholding ethnic unity and guiding "religions to adapt to China’s socialist society". Since his accession to the post, Xinjiang has seen relative normalization in some aspects, such as turnstiles between residential areas being removed and two-day breaks in weekends for public officials being restored. In October 2022, Ma was elected as a member of the CCP Politburo.

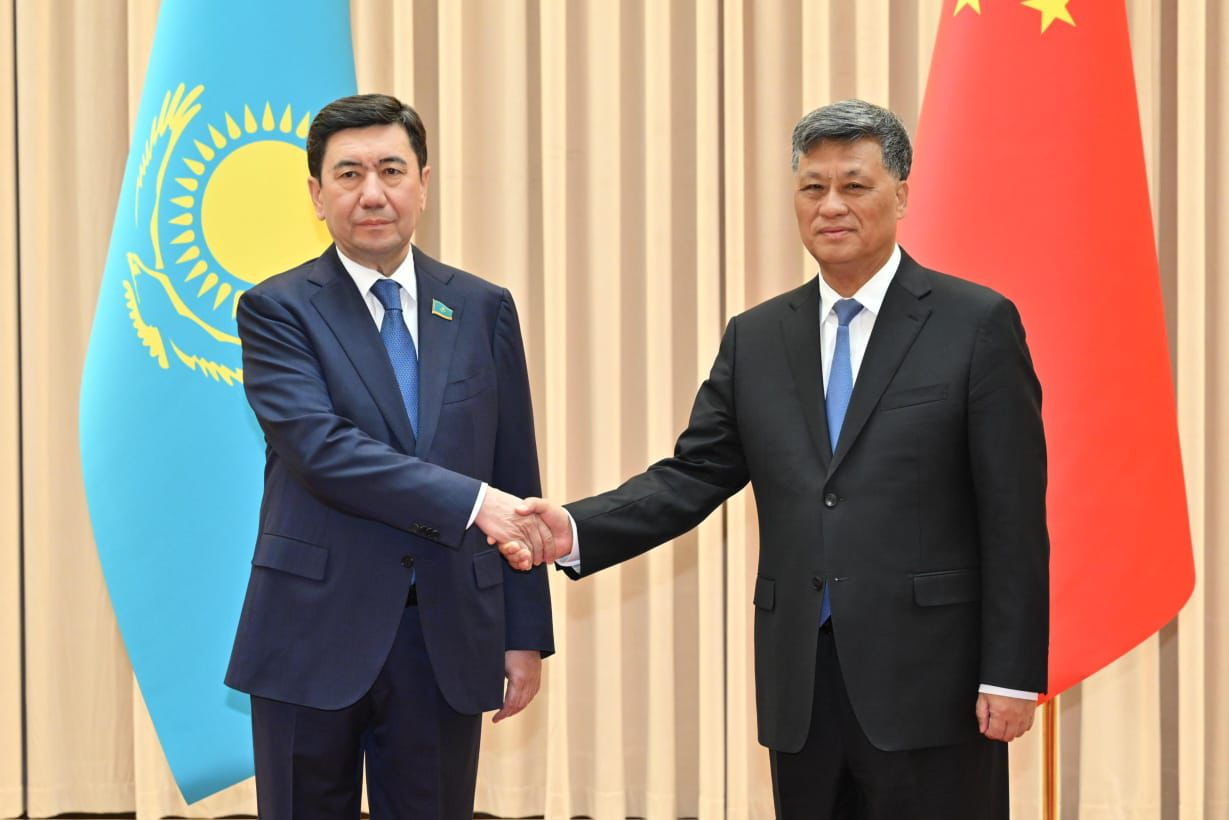
Ma meeting Chairman of the Mäjilis of Kazakhstan Erlan Qoşanov in Ürümqi (2024)

In March 2023, Ma visited Astana, Kazakhstan and met with president Kassym-Jomart Tokayev and prime minister Älihan Smaiylov, discussing boosting trade; his predecessor Chen Quanguo did not undertake any trips overseas during his tenure in Xinjiang. In September 2023, he met with Corinne Vargha, the head of the International Labour Organization's international labor standards department, where he said the accusations of forced labor in Xinjiang were "reckless rumors". In March 2024, Ma stated that sinicization of Islam in Xinjiang is "inevitable." In June 2024, he met with Turkish foreign minister Hakan Fidan. In July 2024, after Xinjiang completed a military-police joint exercise, Ma called for eliminating "all terrorist threats at the initial stage, and push forward with normalizing counterterrorism work". In August 2024, Ma met with Temasek executives from Singapore in Ürümqi to boost foreign investment in Xinjiang, particularly in the energy sector. That same month Ma, along with other senior officials, met with Cambodian king Norodom Sihamoni in Ürümqi.

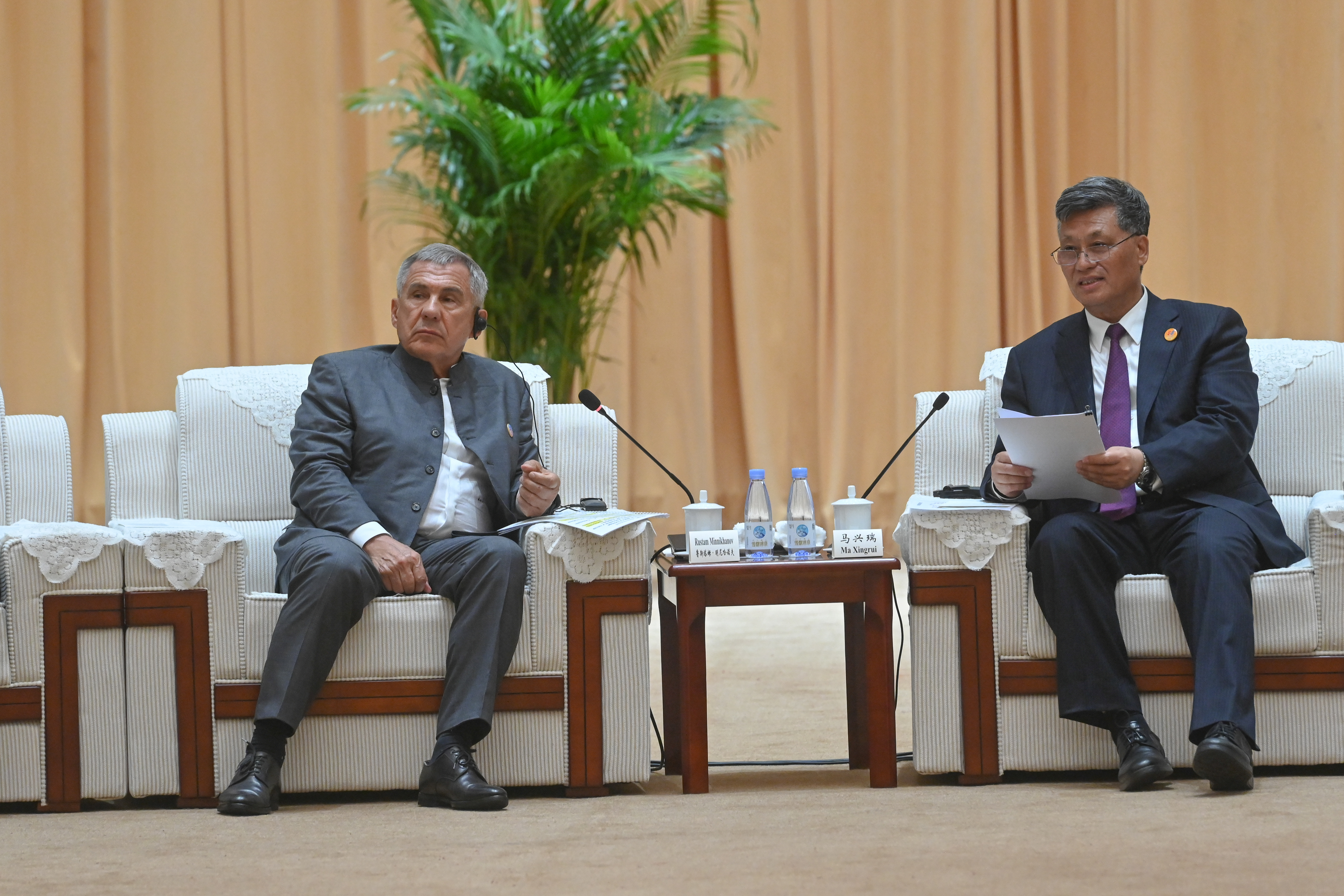
Ma meeting Head of the Republic of Tatarstan Rustam Minnikhanov during Minnikhanov's visit to China (2024)

In an interview with Voice of America, Abduweli Ayup, a Norway-based Uyghur activist, accused Ma of expanding forced labor. Under Ma's tenure from 2021 to 2025, Xinjiang's exports to the United States, Canada, the United Kingdom, and the European Union increased by 465%, increasing by 71% from 2024 to 2025 alone. In March 2025, Ma held meeting with Thai Deputy Prime Minister Phumtham Wechayachai regarding Thailand's deportation of 40 Uyghurs to China. He was succeeded as party secretary by Chen Xiaojiang on 1 July 2025.

== Downfall ==
After leaving Xinjiang, Ma became absent from the several key events since November 2025, sparking speculations about his fate. In December 2025, Chen Weijun, who served as the Executive Vice Chairman of Xinjiang under Ma's tenure, was put under investigation. In March 2026, Guo Yonghang, who served as secretary-general of the Shenzhen Municipal Committee when Ma was the Shenzhen Party secretary, was put under investigation. In April 2026, it was announced that Ma was under investigation by the Central Commission for Discipline Inspection (CCDI) for suspected "serious violation of law and discipline" without further specification. The report of the announcement also revealed that Ma Xingrui had been appointed as the deputy leader of the Central Rural Work Leading Group at some point after leaving Xinjiang. On 26 June 2026, the Standing Committee of the National People's Congress removed Ma as a delegate to the 14th National People's Congress.

On 30 June 2026, the Politburo accepted the report on Ma's cases by the CCDI. On 14 July 2026, Ma was expelled from the CCP Politburo and removed from public office. Xinhua News Agency reported his ill-gotten gains would be confiscated and that he would be handed over to the judiciary to face trial. The CCDI report stated that Ma was found to "lost his ideals and beliefs", abandoned "his political conviction", "betrayed the party's principles and original mission" and "seriously violated [the party's] political discipline and rules". Additionally, the CCDI report stated he had improperly accepted gifts and money, helped his relatives purchase properties at discounted prices, engaged in "power-for-sex and money-for-sex transactions" and fostered "rampant corruption across his family". It stated Ma used his position to seek benefits for others in business operations, project contracting and job promotions" and that through his family and associated, Ma was "illegally accepting huge amounts of money and property". The CCDI stated Ma failed to supervise and manage the illegal conduct of his staff and was "seeking benefits for others in cadre selection and appointment, and improperly arranging jobs for others, personally and through relatives". The CCDI accused Ma of not trustfully reporting his corruption during initial inquiries, stating his behavior continued after the 18th CCP National Congress, and added that Ma's behavior was "extremely serious in nature and [he was] an extremely bad influence".

On 29 October 2026, the fifth plenary session of the 20th CCP Central Committee reviewed and approved the report of the CCDI on the "serious violations of discipline and law" by Ma and confirmed the Politburo decision to expel him from the CCP. On 5 November 2026, the Supreme People's Procuratorate (SPP) announced that prosecutors in Yichang, Hubei had recently filed a case against Ma with the Yichang Intermediate People's Court following an investigation by the National Supervisory Commission, following which the SPP ordered his arrest on the suspicion of accepting bribes and designated the Yichang People's Procuratorate to handle the prosecution. The bribery charges stem from his career at the China Aerospace Science and Technology Corporation beginning in 1999, when he was its deputy general manager, general manager and party secretary, and also cover his tenure in Shenzhen and Guangdong’s provincial party leadership, as well as his Politburo tenure. According to the China Central Television, Ma had "sought benefits for others" and "illegally accepted money and valuables worth an exceptionally large amount".

== Personal life ==
Ma is married to Rong Li, who was his classmate from graduate school. The couple have a daughter, who holds a doctoral degree.

Government offices
Preceded by Zhu Xiaodan	Governor of Guangdong; 2016–2021	Succeeded by Wang Weizhong
Preceded by Chen Qiufa	Director of State Administration for Science, Technology and Industry for National Defense; 2013	Succeeded by Xu Dazhe
Party political offices
Preceded by Chen Quanguo	Party Secretary of Xinjiang; 2021–2025	Succeeded by Chen Xiaojiang
Preceded by Wang Rong	Party Secretary of Shenzhen; 2015–2016	Succeeded by Xu Qin
Preceded by Zhu Mingguo	Secretary of the Guangdong Provincial Political and Legal Affairs Commission; 2013–2015	Succeeded by Lin Shaochun
Preceded by Zhu Mingguo	Deputy Party Secretary of Guangdong; 2013–2016	Succeeded by Ren Xuefeng
