= Wang Jun (politician, born 1952) =

Chinese politician

- 王君

Party Secretary of Inner Mongolia
- In office 18 December 2012 – 29 August 2016
- Deputy: Bagatur (Regional Chairman); Li Jia (Executive Deputy Secretary)
- Preceded by: Hu Chunhua
- Succeeded by: Li Jiheng

Governor of Shanxi
- In office 14 September 2008 – 19 December 2012; Acting until January 2009
- Preceded by: Meng Xuenong
- Succeeded by: Li Xiaopeng

Personal details
- Born: March 26, 1952 (age 73) Datong, Shanxi, China
- Party: Chinese Communist Party (1977–2017)

Wang Jun (Chinese: 王君; pinyin: Wáng Jūn; born March 26, 1952) is a Chinese politician and former senior regional official. He was the Director of the State Administration of Work Safety between March and September 2008. He was appointed acting Governor of Shanxi in north China in September 2008 after a botched government response to a mudslide in the province led to the resignation of then Governor Meng Xuenong. He served as Shanxi Governor until December 2012, when he was transferred to Inner Mongolia to serve as party secretary there. He left active politics in August 2016.

== Biography ==
Wang was born in Datong, Shanxi. He pursued a postgraduate degree at the Chinese Communist Party (CCP) Central Party School, majoring in philosophy. He holds the title of senior engineer at the professorial level. He joined the CCP in July 1977.

At the age of 19, he started working at the Qingciyao coal mine in Shanxi. In 1974, he was recommended to study coal mining at the Shanxi Institute of Mining. After graduation, he was assigned to work at the Datong Mining Bureau. Starting as a normal technician, he was eventually elevated to the position of director of the Bureau. His former posts included technician in the ventilation zone of the Jinhuagong Mine, assistant engineer, deputy head and later head of the ventilation zone, vice manager of Jinhuagong Mine and vice secretary of the CCP committee of the Datong Mining Bureau. In 1993, he became the first deputy director of the mining bureau, and was promoted to director two years later.

After a 20-year tenure at the Datong Mining Bureau, Wang was elevated to the central government in October 1997, becoming the vice minister of Coal Industry. During a reform of the central administration half a year later, the Ministry of Coal Industry was abolished, and Wang became vice director of the newly established National Bureau of Coal Industry, remaining at the rank of vice minister. Beginning in 1999, he served in several posts in Jiangxi Province, including vice governor (alongside Hu Changqing and Huang Zhiquan), vice secretary of the CCP provincial committee and president of the Jiangxi provincial party school. In 2006, he was appointed vice party chief and vice president of the All-China Federation of Supply and Marketing Cooperatives, and was promoted to party chief of the Federation one year later.

On March 20, 2008, three days after the conclusion of the 1st meeting of the 11th National People's Congress, the State Council appointed him president of the State Administration of Work Safety.

Wang Jun was appointed as the acting Governor of Shanxi on September 14, 2008 after the mudslide in Xiangfen. On January 15, 2009, he was formally confirmed as Governor by the provincial legislature. Wang's term as Governor of Shanxi earned him the distinction of being one of a very few heads of provincial government from his generation of leaders who actually worked in his home province. The Communist Party's central authorities generally avoided the practice of appointing people to lead their home provinces to prevent corruption and the formation of regional centers of power.

In December 2012, in a regional leadership re-shuffle, Wang Jun was named Party Secretary of Inner Mongolia, replacing Hu Chunhua. Li Xiaopeng was named acting Governor of Shanxi. On August 29, 2016, it was announced that Li Jiheng would replace Wang Jun as party chief of Inner Mongolia. This meant, effectively, that Wang had retired from active politics; in September 2016 he was named a deputy chair of the National People's Congress Ethnic Affairs Committee.

He was an alternate member of the 16th Central Committee of the Chinese Communist Party and a full member of the 17th Central Committee. He is also a full member of the 18th Central Committee.

Government offices
Preceded by Li Yizhong	Director of State Administration of Work Safety; 2008	Succeeded by Luo Lin
Political offices
Preceded by Meng Xuenong	Governor of Shanxi; 2008–2012	Succeeded by Li Xiaopeng
Party political offices
Preceded by Hu Chunhua	Party Secretary of Inner Mongolia; 2012–2016	Succeeded by Li Jiheng
