= Hebei University of Technology =

Public university in Tianjin, China

- 河北工业大学
- Motto: 勇毅专精 勤慎公忠
- Motto in English: Diligence, Prudence, Devotion and Loyalty
- Type: Public
- Established: 1903; 123 years ago
- President: Prof. Xu Han
- Academic staff: 1,940
- Undergraduates: 23,000
- Postgraduates: 7,500
- Location: Tianjin, China
- Campus: Urban
- Website: hebut.edu.cn eweb.hebut.edu.cn (English)

Chinese name
- Simplified Chinese: 河北工业大学
- Traditional Chinese: 河北工業大學
Transcriptions
Standard Mandarin
- Hanyu Pinyin: Héběi Gōngyè Dàxué

The Hebei University of Technology (HEBUT; Chinese: 河北工业大学; lit. 'Hebei Industrial University') is a provincial public university in Tianjin, China. It is affiliated with the province of Hebei, and co-funded by the Hebei Provincial Government, Tianjin Municipal Government, and the Ministry of Education. It is part of Project 211 and the Double First-Class Construction.

The university has around 23,000 undergraduate students and 7,500 postgraduate students. There is 1,940 academic staff members at the university.

== History ==
The institution was established by Yuan Shikai, receiving a royal charter in 1903 as Peiyang Technological School, from Guangxu Emperor. Zhou Xuexi was the university's first president (Chinese: 总办). The university modeled itself on the famous European and American institutions of higher learning and aimed to rejuvenate China by training qualified personnel with new scientific and technological knowledge. In 1958, after restructuring, institution was renamed Hebei institution of Technology. In 1995, institution was renamed Hebei University of Technology.

=== Timeline ===
1903–1949

1903: Founded with the name Beiyang Technical School.

1904: Renamed as Zhili Higher School of Technology.

1929: Renamed as Hebei Provincial Technological Institute.

1946: Renamed as Hebei Provincial Institute of Technology.

1949–1993

1950: Renamed as Hebei Institute of Technology.

1951: Merged with Beiyang University as Tianjin University.

1958: Re-established as Hebei Institute of Technology.

1962: Integrated with Tianjin Mechanical and Electrical Engineering Institute, Tianjin Institute of Chemical Technology as well as Tianjin Construction and Engineering Institute into Tianjin Institute of Technology.

1971: Restored with the name Hebei Institute of Technology.

1994–present

1995: Renamed the Hebei University of Technology.

1996: Enlisted as one of the first key universities in the former national “Project 211". Successfully completed the three stages of construction.

== Campuses ==
HEBUT's main campus is located in Tianjin, China. The different campus areas are named as follows; Beichen campus, Hongqiao South Campus, Hongqiao East Campus. The campuses themselves contain many amenities and student housing.

The university has a teaching and research equipment is worth 372 million RMB, and there are 1.88 million books in the university library located on the Beichen campus.

HEBUT is also partnered with Lappeenranta-Lahti University of Technology LUT in Finland to host English bachelor's programs on two different campuses in Finland. These campuses are located in the cities of Lappeenranta and Lahti, Finland.

== Programs ==
HEBUT offers 69 undergraduate bachelor's programs, in addition to master's and doctoral programs. Programs are generally taught in Chinese in fields of engineering, design, and business, and there is also a non-degree program lasting 1 semester consisting of Chinese Language. The university also offers programs in Chinese law and politics.

== Internationalization ==
HEBUT has been committed to international cooperation and attaches importance to the development, quality improvement and brand building of educational exchanges. It was qualified by a Chinese government project to award international student scholarships. At present, HEBUT has generated international exchange programs with universities in more than 60 countries and regions including France, the United States, Germany, Russia, Italy, Australia, Great Britain, Finland, Japan, Hong Kong and Taiwan. Over 20 exchange programs are being carried out, which so far have received 500 international students for non-degree education and sent more than 800 students abroad.

== Faculty ==
HEBUT employs 2474 faculty members. Among them 1365 full-time teachers, 706 of which hold senior professional titles, as well as 682 teachers with doctorate degrees. HEBUT operates team of national technology expertise, 3 state-level teaching teams, 2 innovative research teams with the Ministry of Education, as well as 5 provincial teaching teams.

== Research ==
HEBUT commits to research with 17 different providential institutes, as well as a laboratory and engineering research center.

After the establishment of the Hebei University of Technology National Defense and Science Institute, the university obtained a qualification to perform military research.

HEBUT is open to research from the government of the PRC, as well as private corporations who are looking to do product and theoretical research.

== Notable Peoples ==
=== Alumni ===
- Jia Qinglin, former Chairman of the National Committee of the Chinese People's Political Consultative Conference.
- Wang Xuejun, former Governor of the People's Government of Anhui Province.

=== Faculty ===
- Artist and art teacher, Li Shutong
