= Bao'an Daily =

Chinese daily newspaper

- Native name: 宝安日报
- Type: Daily newspaper; state media
- Owner: Shenzhen Press Group
- Founded: October 28, 1949
- Language: Chinese
- Headquarters: Shenzhen
- OCLC number: 502653313
- Website: baoandaily.com barb.sznews.com

Bao'an Daily (Chinese: 宝安日报), or spelled as Baoan Daily, also known as Bao'an Ribao, is a Shenzhen-based simplified Chinese newspaper published in the People's Republic of China, originally launched on October 28, 1949.

== History ==
The predecessor of Bao'an Daily was Bao'an Farmers' Post (宝安农民报), the organ newspaper of Bao'an Committee of the Chinese Communist Party, which was inaugurated on October 28, 1949, and was the first newspaper in the whole of Shenzhen after the founding of the PRC.

On October 24, 1956, Bao'an Farmers' Post was renamed Bao'an Post (宝安报), which was renamed Bao'an Daily on January 1, 1959. On July 1, 1959, Baoan Daily was renamed back to Baoan Post. During the Cultural Revolution, the newspaper was suspended and resumed publication on July 1, 1993.

After its relaunch in 1993, Bao'an Daily was originally the organ newspaper of the Bao'an District Committee of the CCP. In September 2004, the paper was merged into Shenzhen Press Group.
