= Party Secretary of Shenzhen =

Government position in China

Secretary of the Shenzhen Municipal Committee of the Chinese Communist Party
- 中国共产党深圳市委员会书记
- Emblem of the Chinese Communist Party

- Flag of the Chinese Communist Party
- Incumbent; Jin Lei since 22 March 2026
- Shenzhen Municipal Committee of the Chinese Communist Party
- Type: Party Committee Secretary
- Status: Deputy provincial and ministerial-level official
- Member of: Shenzhen Municipal Standing Committee
- Seat: Shenzhen
- Nominator: Central Committee
- Appointer: Shenzhen Municipal Committee; Central Committee
- Inaugural holder: Zhang Xunfu
- Formation: 1979
- Deputy: Deputy Secretary; Secretary-General

The secretary of the Shenzhen Municipal Committee of the Chinese Communist Party is the leader of the Shenzhen Municipal Committee of the Chinese Communist Party (CCP). As the CCP is the sole ruling party of the People's Republic of China (PRC), the secretary is the highest ranking post in Shenzhen, which outranks the mayor, conventionally being the deputy secretary of the municipal committee. The secretary is also the leader of the Standing Committee of the Shenzhen Municipal Committee.

The secretary is officially appointed by the CCP Central Committee based on the recommendation of the CCP Organization Department, which is then approved by the Politburo and its Standing Committee. The secretary could also appointed by a plenary meeting of the Shenzhen Municipal Committee, which the candidate must be the same as the one approved by the central government.

The current secretary is Meng Fanli, who took office on 18 April 2022.

== List of party secretaries ==
No.	English name	Chinese name	Took office	Left office	References
1	Zhang Xunfu	张勋甫	23 January 1979	17 June 1980	
2	Wu Nansheng	吴南生	17 June 1980	6 March 1981	
3	Liang Xiang	梁湘	6 March 1981	15 May 1986	
4	Li Hao	李灏	15 May 1986	April 1993	
5	Li Youwei	厉有为	April 1993	January 1998	
6	Zhang Gaoli	张高丽	January 1998	16 December 2001	
7	Huang Liman	黄丽满	17 December 2001	17 March 2005	
8	Li Hongzhong	李鸿忠	17 March 2005	November 2007	
9	Liu Yupu	刘玉浦	September 2008	April 2010	
10	Wang Rong	王荣	April 2010	March 2015	
11	Ma Xingrui	马兴瑞	26 March 2015	30 December 2016	
12	Xu Qin	许勤	30 December 2016	1 April 2017	
13	Wang Weizhong	王伟中	1 April 2017	18 April 2022	
14	Meng Fanli	孟凡利	18 April 2022	22 March 2026	
15	Jin Lei	靳磊	22 March 2026	Incumbent	
