= Shenzhen Evening News =

Chinese newspaper based in Shenzhen

- Native name: 深圳晚报
- Type: Daily newspaper; state media
- Owner: Shenzhen Press Group
- Language: Chinese
- Headquarters: Guangzhou, Guangdong
- Circulation: 490,000
- Website: www.sznews.com.cn/szwb/

The Shenzhen Evening News (深圳晚报) is a Chinese newspaper in Guangzhou, Guangdong, China. It is owned by Shenzhen Press Group.

Having around 490,000 papers in circulation daily, the Shenzhen Evening News is known to report on social and familial issues, as well as the market, personal finance, and politics. The newspaper was referenced by The New York Times and The Washington Post following the 2015 Shenzhen Landslide, where The New York Times found that the Shenzhen Evening News' foresaw the incident and wrote about it earlier in October that year.
