= Zhang Baoshun =

Chinese politician

- 张宝顺

Party Secretary of Anhui
- In office 31 May 2010 – 1 June 2015
- Preceded by: Wang Jinshan
- Succeeded by: Wang Xuejun

Party Secretary of Shanxi
- In office 1 July 2005 – 31 May 2010
- Preceded by: Tian Chengping
- Succeeded by: Yuan Chunqing

Governor of Shanxi
- In office 19 February 2004 – 9 July 2005
- Preceded by: Liu Zhenhua
- Succeeded by: Yu Youjun

Vice President of the Xinhua News Agency
- In office 23 April 1993 – 28 September 2001
- President: Guo Chaoren; Tian Congming

President of the All-China Youth Federation
- In office 27 December 1991 – 23 April 1993
- Preceded by: Liu Yandong
- Succeeded by: Liu Peng

Personal details
- Born: February 27, 1950 (age 76) Qinhuangdao, Hebei, China
- Party: Chinese Communist Party
- Education: Renmin University of China; Jilin University
- Occupation: Politician

Chinese name
- Traditional Chinese: 張寶順
- Simplified Chinese: 张宝顺
Transcriptions
Standard Mandarin
- Hanyu Pinyin: Zhāng Bǎoshùn

Zhang Baoshun (Chinese: 张宝顺; born February 1950) is a retired politician of the People's Republic of China, and the former Party Secretary of Anhui.

== Early life ==
Zhang was born in Qinhuangdao, Hebei, on February 27, 1950.

== Career ==
Zhang started working in November 1968, and joined the Chinese Communist Party in April 1971. He served in various posts in Qinhuangdao harbor administration bureau before entering Communist Youth League central committee in December 1978. From December 1982 to November 1985, Zhang was an alternate secretary of CYL central secretariat and director of CYL department of workers and peasants youth. He was elevated to a secretary of CYL central secretariat in November 1985, and the post was confirmed as the rank of vice minister in November 1991. From August 1982 to June 1987, he took correspondence courses at Renmin University of China and obtained a degree in Marxism-Leninism theory. From November 1991, he became the chairman of Chinese Youth Association and a secretary of CYL central secretariat. From December 1989 to December 1991, he pursued an on-job master's degree in national economic planning and management in school of economic management of Jilin University. In April 1993, Zhang became the vice president of Xinhua News Agency and a Party committee member there. In March 1998, Zhang was elevated to vice president and vice Party chief of Xinhua Agency. From September 2001 to January 2004, he was the vice secretary of CCP Shanxi committee. From January 2004, he served as vice governor, acting governor and later governor of Shanxi. Since July 2005, he has served as secretary of CCP Shanxi committee, and also served as chairman of Shanxi provincial People's Congress since January 2006.

Zhang was a member of 14th Central Commission for Discipline Inspection. He was an alternate member of 16th Central Committee of the CCP, and a full member of the 17th and 18th Central Committees. On October 30, 2011, he was officially elected as secretary of east China's Anhui Provincial Committee of the Chinese Communist Party at the first plenary session of the 9th CCP Anhui Provincial Committee.

Zhang retired as party chief of Anhui in June 2015 after reaching the age of 65, which is typically the retirement age of provincial-level officials.

Non-profit organization positions
Previous: Liu Yandong	President of the All-China Youth Federation; 1991–1993	Next: Liu Peng
Political offices
Preceded by Liu Zhenhua	Governor of Shanxi; January 2004 – July 2005	Succeeded by Yu Youjun
Party political offices
Preceded by Tian Chengping	Party Secretary of Shanxi; July 2005 – May 2010	Succeeded by Yuan Chunqing
Preceded by Wang Jinshan	Party Secretary of Anhui; May 2010 – June 2015	Succeeded by Wang Xuejun
