= Qin Weizhong =

Chinese politician (born 1971), mayor of Shenzhen

- 覃伟中
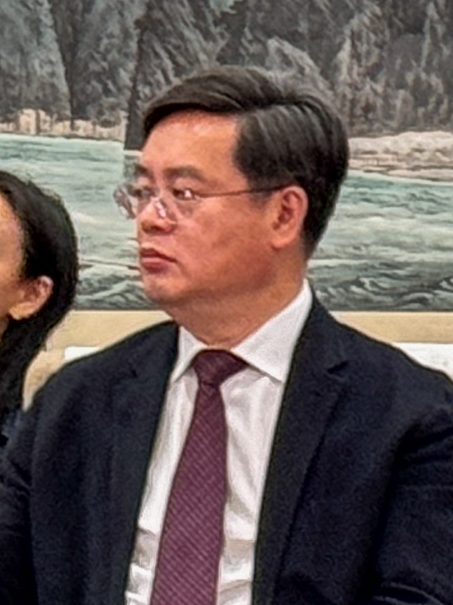

Mayor of Shenzhen
- In office 19 May 2021 – 24 August 2026
- Party Secretary: Wang Weizhong; Meng Fanli; Jin Lei
- Preceded by: Chen Rugui
- Succeeded by: Li Yun

Personal details
- Born: July 1971 (age 55) Jilin, Jilin, China
- Party: Chinese Communist Party
- Education: Tsinghua University

Chinese name
- Simplified Chinese: 覃伟中
- Traditional Chinese: 覃偉中
Transcriptions
Standard Mandarin
- Hanyu Pinyin: Qín Wěizhōng

Qin Weizhong (Chinese: 覃伟中; born July 1971) is a Chinese politician who was served as mayor of Shenzhen from April 2021 to August 2026.

== Biography ==
Qin was born in Jilin, Jilin province, Northeast China in July 1971. His ancestral home is in Yulin, Guangxi. After graduating from Tsinghua University in 1996, he was assigned to the China Petrochemical Corporation as an engineer.

He joined the Chinese Communist Party in June 2001. In March 2017, Qin was promoted to deputy general manager of China National Petroleum Corporation and chairman of China Petroleum Engineering Co., Ltd.

In March 2019, he was appointed vice governor of Guangdong. In April 2021, he was promoted to be deputy party secretary of Shenzhen, concurrently holding the acting mayor position. He was elected mayor in May of that same year.

In August 2026, Qin resigned as mayor of Shenzhen, and was appointed a member of the party leadership group of the Standing Committee of the Guangdong Provincial People's Congress.

== Downfall ==
On September 21, 2026, he was suspected of "serious violation of law and discipline" and put under investigation by the Central Commission for Discipline Inspection (CCDI), and the National Supervisory Commission.

Government offices
Preceded by Chen Rugui	Mayor of Shenzhen; 2021–2026	Succeeded by Li Yun
