= Jin Lei =

Chinese politician

- 靳磊

Party Secretary of Shenzhen
- Incumbent
- Assumed office 22 March 2026
- Deputy: Qin Weizhong (Mayor); Li Yun (Mayor)
- Preceded by: Meng Fanli

Party Secretary of Deyang
- In office December 2019 – July 2022
- Preceded by: Zhao Shiyong
- Succeeded by: Li Wenqing

Mayor of Anyang
- In office September 2018 – December 2019
- Preceded by: Wang Xinwei
- Succeeded by: Yuan Jiajian

Personal details
- Born: February 1970 (age 56) Jiyuan, Henan, China
- Party: Chinese Communist Party (since 1999)
- Education: Wuhan University; Xiamen University

Chinese name
- Simplified Chinese: 靳磊
Transcriptions
Standard Mandarin
- Hanyu Pinyin: Jìn Lěi

Jin Lei (Chinese: 靳磊; born February 1970) is a Chinese politician and economist who is the current Chinese Communist Party Committee Secretary of Shenzhen, in office since March 2026. Previously, he served as party secretary of Deyang (2019–2022) and mayor of Anyang (2018–2019).

== Early life ==
Jin was born on 1970 in city of Jiyuan in Henan province, China. He graduated from Wuhan University in 1992 with a degree in administrative management from the Department of Political Science.

== Political career ==
=== Henan ===
In July 1992, he began his career at the Economic Research Institute of the Henan Provincial Commission for Economy and Trade. In 1996, he transitioned into government administration, serving as a cadre in the Finance Division of the Henan Provincial Planning Commission. Later that year, he pursued further studies at Xiamen University, majoring in finance, and obtained a master's degree in economics in June 2002. Following his postgraduate studies, he was appointed deputy director of the General Office of the Henan Provincial Development and Reform Commission in August 2004. He later served as deputy director of the administration of government offices under both the CCP Henan Provincial Committee and the provincial government starting in February 2009. In December 2011, he returned to the Development and Reform Commission as deputy director.

His career subsequently moved into municipal leadership. In April 2015, he joined the Standing Committee of the CCP Zhoukou Municipal Committee and served concurrently as Head of its Organization Department. In September 2016, he was transferred to Zhengzhou, where he held multiple key roles, including deputy secretary of the CCP Zhengzhou Municipal Committee, secretary general of the Municipal Committee and president of the CCP school. Two years later, in September 2018, he was appointed deputy secretary of the CCP Anyang Municipal Committee and Mayor of Anyang.

=== Sichuan ===
In December 2019, he was transferred to Sichuan province to serve as secretary of the CCP Deyang Municipal Committee. In May 2022, he was elected to the Standing Committee of the CCP Sichuan Provincial Committee, elevating him to vice-ministerial rank. He was subsequently appointed Secretary of the Political and Legal Affairs Commission of the provincial committee in July 2022.

In January 2024, he took on an additional role as head of the Social Work Department of the Sichuan Provincial Committee, a position he held until June 2025. In January 2025, he stepped down from his role in political and legal affairs and was reassigned as head of the Organization Department of the CCP Sichuan Provincial Committee.

=== Guangdong ===
In March 2026, he was transferred to Guangdong and was appointed the secretary of the CCP Shenzhen Municipal Committee, while concurrently a serving a member of the Standing Committee of the CCP Guangdong Provincial Committee. His appointment as Shenzhen party secretary has drawn attention both for the strategic weight of the post and his links to the 'Xiamen University Finance and Economics Network'. His economics training and technocratic along with cross-regional experience, despite a career outside first-tier cities, position his elevation as reflective of the network's expanding influence. His tenure coincided with intensified efforts to regulate Shenzhen's large electric bicycle population, estimated at up to 7.5 million by 2025. Expanded 'three-tier' traffic restrictions, introduced alongside preparations for the upcoming 2026 APEC summit, positioned the issue as an early governance test, reflecting ongoing challenges in balancing urban regulation, mobility and livelihoods.

Party political offices
Preceded by Meng Fanli	Party Secretary of Shenzhen; 2026–	Incumbent
Preceded by Zhao Shiyong	Communist Party Secretary of Deyang; 2019-2022	Succeeded by Li Wenqing
Government offices
Preceded by Wang Xinwei	Mayor of Anyang; 2018-2019	Succeeded by Yuan Jiajian
