= Guilin University of Technology =

University in Guangxi, China

- 桂林理工大学 (Chinese); Gveilinz Lijgungh Dayoz (Zhuang)
- Motto: 厚德笃学、惟实励新
- Type: Public
- Established: 1956; 70 years ago
- President: Wang Dunqiu (王敦球)
- Party Secretary: Nong Yi (农毅)
- Total staff: 3,300 (Mar. 2026)
- Students: 47,000 (Mar. 2026)
- Location: Guilin and Nanning, Guangxi, China
- Campus: Multiple site
- Website: www.glut.edu.cn

Guilin University of Technology (GUT) is a provincial university in Guilin and Nanning, Guangxi, China.

== History ==
=== Founding ===
The origins of Guilin University of Technology can be traced back to the Guilin Geological School, which was founded in 1956 by the Ministry of Heavy Industry. Preparations began in January of that year, with a temporary campus established at the foot of Putuo Hill. The school was officially established on 31 August, and in December, a newly completed campus came into use on Liuhe Road near the foot of Pingfeng Hill. In August 1958, the administration of the school was transferred to the Guangxi People's Government, and it was upgraded to a junior college under the name Guilin Metallurgical College. The Xiwan branch was opened in Pinggui, Hezhou that same year.

In 1960, the college was renamed the Guangxi College of Mining and Metallurgy and began enrolling undergraduate students, while concurrently admitting junior college and secondary specialized students. However, affected by the Great Chinese Famine, the institution scaled down its operations and suspended new admissions in 1961. In the latter half of 1961, the Guangxi People's Government decided to shut down the Xiwan Branch, the Guangxi Geological Junior College and the Tianyang Coal and Petroleum School. Consequently, the personnel, students, and equipment from these entities were consolidated into the Guangxi Institute of Mining and Metallurgy. In August of that year, the institution was restructured as a junior college and renamed the Guangxi College of Mining. In 1963, administration of the college reverted to the Ministry of Metallurgical Industry, and the institution returned to a four-year secondary specialized school system. Concurrently, the curriculum was consolidated, retaining only the geology and exploration geophysics majors while introducing geochemical prospecting, and the college was renamed the Guilin Metallurgical and Geological School.

=== Cultural Revolution ===
Admission was suspended again during the Cultural Revolution, and instruction was severely disrupted. In response, the school altered its instructional format by establishing a "school-run geological team" to continue its educational mission. In January 1970, the school formed the 701 Geological Exploration Team, transferring the majority of its faculty, staff, and graduating students to the unit to conduct geological surveys and exploration across Guangxi. In June 1970, the school came under the dual leadership of the local government and the Ministry of Metallurgical Industry—with the local government assuming the primary role—and the institution was renamed the Guangxi Metallurgical and Geological School. That October, amid the geopolitical tensions of the Sino-Soviet split, the ministry decided to relocated the research institute, the Beijing Institute of Geology to Guilin to merge with the school, attempting to establish a new institutional framework that integrated teaching, scientific research, and production. In March 1971, the consolidated institution was officially designated as the Guilin Institute of Metallurgical Geology. In 1972, the institution began enrolling worker-peasant-soldier students nationwide. In December 1973, the research institute split from the school, retaining its name as the Guilin Institute of Metallurgical Geology, and relocated to a new site in Guilin. Concurrently, the school reverted to its former name, the Guangxi Metallurgical and Geological School. In March 1976, the 701 Geological Exploration Team was separated from the school and officially incorporated into the Guangxi Metallurgical Geological Exploration Company.

=== Growth and Expansion ===
Following the end of the Cultural Revolution, the institution enrolled its final class of secondary specialized students in 1977. It then resumed undergraduate enrollment in the autumn of 1978, admitting 35 students into its exploration geophysics program. On December 28 of the same year, the school was officially upgraded and renamed the Guilin Metallurgical and Geological College under the direct administration of the Ministry of Metallurgical Industry, marking the formal conclusion of its secondary specialized school system. In 1982, the college was approved as one of China's first batch of bachelor's degree-conferring institutions. In October 1983, the administration was transferred to the China National Non-Ferrous Metals Industry Corporation, which had split off from the ministry. The college was later approved as a master's degree-granting institution in 1986, and in December 1993, it was renamed the Guilin Institute of Technology.

Following the dissolution of the corporation, administration of the institute reverted to the Guangxi People's Government in April 1998. The institution then expanded by incorporating the Nanning Nonferrous Metals Industrial School in January 2000, and the Guilin Normal School for Nationalities in December 2004. On 29 March 2009, the institution was officially renamed the Guilin University of Technology. It was subsequently approved as a doctoral degree-conferring institutions in 2013.

== Faculty and departments ==
The university comprises the following academic units, grouped by discipline:

=== Sciences and Engineering ===
- College of Earth Sciences
- College of Environmental Science and Engineering
- College of Materials Sciences and Engineering
- College of Chemistry and Bioengineering
- College of Civil Engineering
- College of Geomatics and Geoinformation
- College of Computer Science and Engineering (College of Artificial Intelligence)
- College of Mechanical and Control Engineering
- College of Physics and Electronic Information Engineering
- College of Mathematics and Statistics

=== Humanities, Business, and Arts ===
- Business School
- College of Tourism and Landscape Architecture (College of Plant and Ecological Engineering)
- College of Arts
- College of Foreign Studies (College of International Education)
- School of Marxism

=== Other Academic Units ===
- School of Continuing Education
- Department of Physical Education
- GUT-APU College of Information Technology (cooperative program with Asia Pacific University of Technology & Innovation)
- Nanning Branch

== Partner Institution ==
=== Poland ===
- Wrocław University of Science and Technology
- Poznań University of Technology

=== Malaysia ===
- Multimedia University
- Universiti Tunku Abdul Rahman
