= Shenzhen Municipal Committee of the Chinese Communist Party =

Shenzhen Municipal Committee of the Chinese Communist Party 中国共产党深圳市委员会

Overview
- Type: Highest decision-making organ when Shenzhen Municipal Congress is not in session.
- Elected by: Shenzhen Municipal Congress
- Length of term: Five years
- Term limits: None
- First convocation: March 1979

Leadership
- Secretary: Meng Fanli
- Deputy Secretary: Qin Weizhong (Mayor)
- Executive organ: Standing Committee
- Inspection organ: Commission for Discipline Inspection

Meeting place
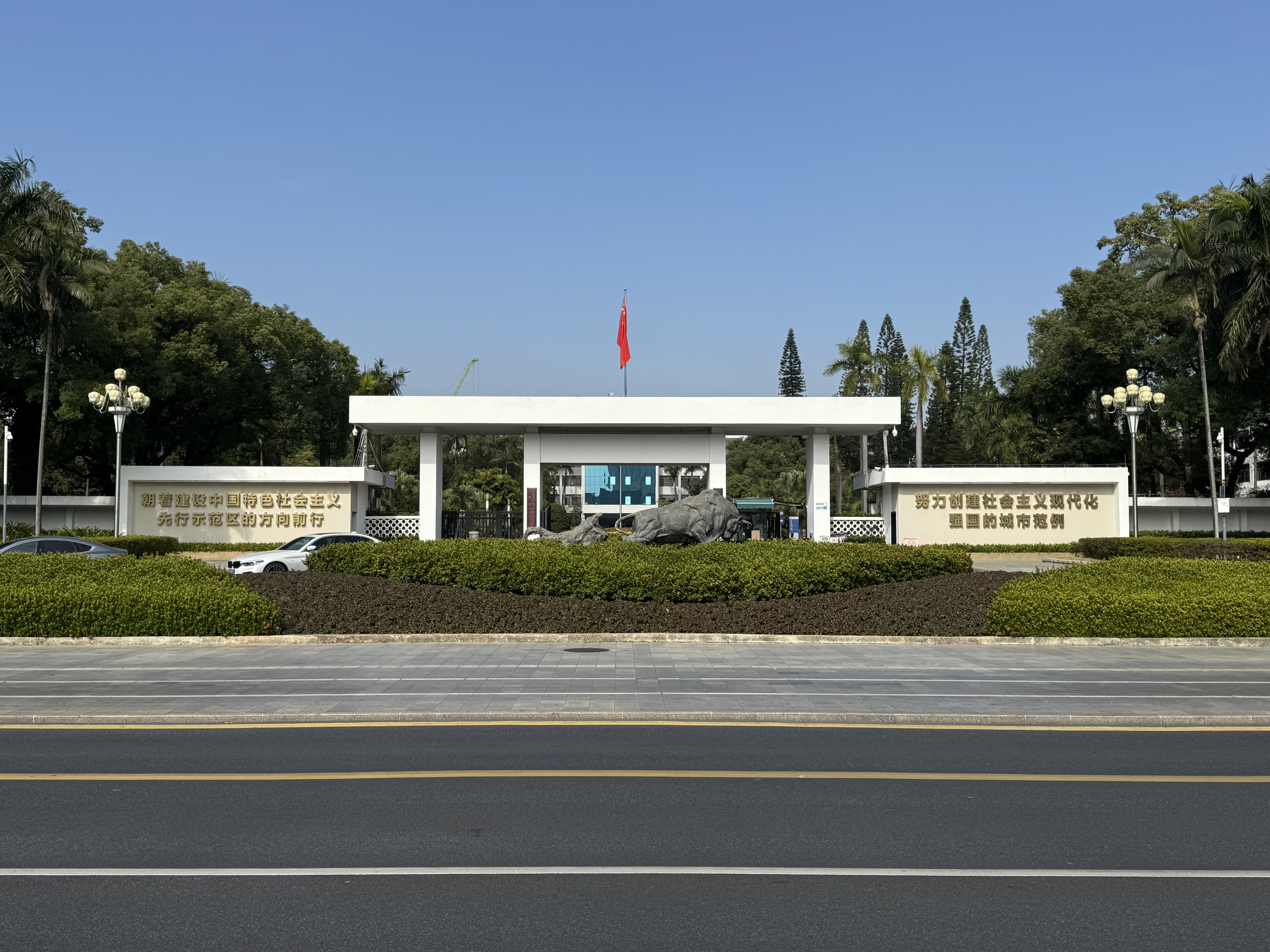
- Shenzhen Municipal Committee Building

Shenzhen Municipal Committee of the Chinese Communist Party
- Simplified Chinese: 中国共产党深圳市委员会
- Traditional Chinese: 中國共產黨深圳市委員會
Transcriptions
Standard Mandarin
- Hanyu Pinyin: Zhōngguó Gòngchǎndǎng Shēnzhènshì Wěiyuánhuì

Abbreviation
- Chinese: 中共深圳市委
- Literal meaning: CCP Shenzhen Municipal Committee
Transcriptions
Standard Mandarin
- Hanyu Pinyin: Zhōnggòng Shēnzhènshì Wěi

The Shenzhen Municipal Committee of the Chinese Communist Party is the municipal committee of the Chinese Communist Party (CCP) in Shenzhen. The CCP committee secretary is the highest ranking post in the city. The current secretary is Meng Fanli, who succeeded Wang Weizhong in December 2021.

== History ==
In January 1979, with the approval of the State Council, Bao'an County was abolished and the county-level Shenzhen City was established. In March 1979, the Bao'an County Committee was abolished and the Shenzhen Municipal Committee of the CCP was established. The first secretary was Zhang Xunfu, who was preparing to establish Shenzhen. In June 1980, the leadership structure of the Shenzhen Municipal Committee of the CCP was changed to the first secretary, executive secretary, secretary and standing committee member.

In October 1981, Shenzhen Special Economic Zone was established and the Shenzhen Special Economic Zone Committee of the CCP was established. In January 1982, after the State Council approved the establishment of Shenzhen City at the prefecture level, the Shenzhen Municipal Committee of the CCP was formally established. In July 1986, the CCP Guangdong Provincial Committee adjusted the leadership of the Shenzhen Municipal Committee. In December 1990, the First Shenzhen Municipal Congress of the CCP was held, and the First Shenzhen Municipal Committee of the CCP was elected.

== Organization ==
The organization of the Shenzhen Municipal Committee includes:

- General Office

=== Functional Departments ===
- Organization Department
- Propaganda Department
- United Front Work Department
- Society Work Department
- Political and Legal Affairs Commission

=== Offices ===
- Policy Research Office
- Office of the Cyberspace Affairs Commission
- Internet Enterprise Working Committee
- Foreign Affairs Office
- Office of the Institutional Organization Commission
- Office of the Military-civilian Fusion Development Committee
- Office of the Financial and Economic Affairs Committee
- Office of the Financial Work Committee
- Taiwan Work Office
- Hong Kong and Macao Work Office
- Office of the Leading Group for Inspection Work
- Bureau of Veteran Cadres

=== Dispatched institutions ===
- Directly Affiliated Organs Working Committee
- Dapeng New District Working Committee
- Shenshan Special Cooperation Zone Working Committee
- Qianhai Shenzhen-Hong Kong Modern Service Industry Cooperation Zone Working Committee

=== Organizations directly under the Committee ===
- Shenzhen Municipal Party School
- Shenzhen Media Group
- Shenzhen Socialist College
- Party History and Documentation Research Office
- Shenzhen Archives

== See also ==
- Guangdong Provincial Committee of the Chinese Communist Party
