= Information Centre for Human Rights and Democracy =

Human rights organization in Hong Kong

The Information Centre for Human Rights and Democracy (Chinese: 中国人权民运信息中心; pinyin: Zhōngguó rénquán mínyùn xìnxī zhōngxīn) is a human rights organization based in Hong Kong that provides information human rights abuses in mainland China for news outlets. It is run single-handedly by Frank Lu Siqing.

A municipal court document obtained by Lu claims his information center was "registered in Hong Kong by foreign hostile element Frank Lu Siqing."

Lu may be able to continue his operations legally as Hong Kong is governed under the one country, two systems policy.

Lu has been imprisoned in mainland China twice, first in 1981 for calling for freedom of speech and again in 1989 for supporting the Tiananmen Square pro-democracy movement.

== Quote ==
If I don't speak up, then nobody will say anything. I will continue. I won't stop.

— Frank Lu Siqing
