= Meng Fanli =

Chinese politician (born 1965)

- 孟凡利

Governor of Guangdong
- Incumbent
- Assumed office October 11, 2025
- Party Secretary: Huang Kunming
- Preceded by: Wang Weizhong

Party Secretary of Shenzhen
- In office April 19, 2022 – March 22, 2026
- Deputy: Qin Weizhong (Mayor)
- Preceded by: Wang Weizhong
- Succeeded by: Jin Lei

Party Secretary of Baotou
- In office September 29, 2020 – April 19, 2022
- Deputy: Zhao Jiangtao → Zhang Rui (Mayor)
- Preceded by: Zhang Yuanzhong
- Succeeded by: Ding Xiufeng

Mayor of Qingdao
- In office March 27, 2017 – September 29, 2020
- Party Secretary: Zhang Jiangting → Wang Qingxian
- Preceded by: Zhang Xinqi
- Succeeded by: Zhao Haozhi

Party Secretary of Yantai
- In office May 13, 2015 – March 26, 2017
- Deputy: Zhang Yongxia (Mayor)
- Preceded by: Zhang Jiangting
- Succeeded by: Wang Hao

Mayor of Yantai
- In office August 19, 2013 – May 18, 2015
- Party Secretary: Zhang Jiangting
- Preceded by: Wang Liang
- Succeeded by: Zhang Yongxia

Personal details
- Born: September 1965 (age 61) Linyi County, Shandong, China
- Party: Chinese Communist Party
- Education: Shandong University of Finance and Economics; Nankai University; Tianjin University of Finance and Economics
- Website: Governor of Guangdong

Meng Fanli (Chinese: 孟凡利; pinyin: Mèng Fánlì; born September 1965) is a Chinese politician currently serving as Chinese Communist Party Deputy Committee Secretary and governor of Guangdong Province. He is also a delegate to the 13th National People's Congress.

== Biography ==
=== Early career and Shandong Province ===
In July 2013, he became Deputy Secretary of the CCP Yantai Municipal Committee and Party Secretary of the Municipal Government. In August, he was appointed Acting Mayor of Yantai, concurrently serving as Deputy Party Secretary and Party Secretary of the Municipal Government (he was formally elected Mayor in January 2014).

In May 2015, he was appointed Secretary of the CCP Yantai Municipal Committee and President of the Party School of the CCP Yantai Committee.

In March 2017, he was appointed Deputy Secretary of the CCP Qingdao Municipal Committee, Party Secretary of the Qingdao Municipal Government, Vice Mayor, and Acting Mayor. He was elected Mayor in April of the same year.

In February 2018, he was elected a deputy to the 13th National People's Congress.

=== Inner Mongolia Autonomous Region ===
In September 2020, he was transferred to serve as Member of the Standing Committee of the CCP Inner Mongolia Autonomous Regional Committee and Secretary of the CCP Baotou Municipal Committee.

In November 2021, he was elected Deputy Secretary of the CCP Inner Mongolia Autonomous Regional Committee.

=== Guangdong Province ===
In April 2022, Meng was appointed Deputy Party Secretary of the CCP Guangdong and Party Secretary of Shenzhen.

In October of the same year, he was elected a member of the 20th Central Committee of the Chinese Communist Party.

In September 2025, he started to serve as the Party Secretary of the Government of Guangdong.

In October 2025, he was appointed Vice and Acting Governor of Guangdong Province. He formally took the governor position in the same month.

Government offices
Preceded by Wang Weizhong	Governor of Guangdong; 2025–	Incumbent
Preceded by Zhang Xinqi	Mayor of Qingdao; 2017–2020	Succeeded by Zhao Haozhi
Preceded by Wang Liang	Mayor of Yantai; 2013–2015	Succeeded by Zhang Yongxia
Preceded by Lü Zaimo	Director of Shandong Provincial Department of Commerce; 2013	Succeeded by Wang Hua
Party political offices
Preceded by Wang Weizhong	Party Secretary of Shenzhen; 2022–2026	Succeeded by Jin Lei
Preceded by Zhang Yuanzhong	Party Secretary of Baotou; 2020–2022	Succeeded by Ding Xiufeng
Preceded by Zhang Jiangting	Party Secretary of Yantai; 2015–2017	Succeeded by Wang Hao
