= Shenzhen Municipal People's Congress =

Local government in China

Shenzhen Municipal People's Congress 深圳市人民代表大会
- 7th Shenzhen Provincial People's Congress

Type
- Type: Province-level people's congress

Leadership
- Chairman of the Standing Committee: Dai Yunlong, CCP since February 2024

Elections
- Shenzhen Municipal People's Congress voting system: Plurality-at-large voting & Two-round system

Shenzhen Municipal People's Congress
- Simplified Chinese: 深圳市人民代表大会
- Traditional Chinese: 深圳市人民代表大會
Transcriptions
Standard Mandarin
- Hanyu Pinyin: Shēnzhèn Shì Rénmín Dàibiǎo Dàhuì

The Shenzhen Municipal People's Congress is the local people's congress of Shenzhen, a city of China. The Congress is elected for a term of five years. The Shenzhen Municipal People's Congress meetings are held at least once a year. After a proposal by more than one-fifth of the deputies, a meeting of the people's congress at the corresponding level may be convened temporarily.

== Organization ==
The Shenzhen Municipal People's Congress has special committees such as the Legal Affairs Committee and the Planning and Budget Committee. Each special committee is under the leadership of the Congress; when the Congress is not in session, it is under the leadership of the Standing Committee.

== See also ==
- System of people's congress
