= Wang Weizhong =

Chinese politician (born 1962)

- 王伟中
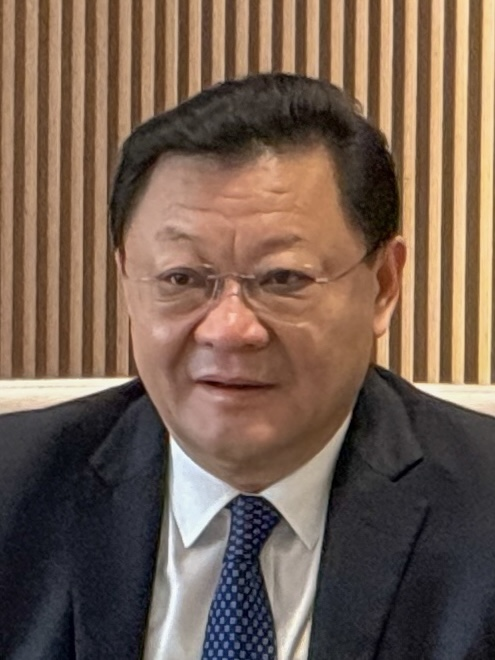
- Wang in 2024

Party Secretary of Inner Mongolia
- Incumbent
- Assumed office 30 September 2025
- Deputy: Bao Gang (Chairman of the Region)
- Preceded by: Sun Shaocheng

Chairperson of the Standing Committee of the Inner Mongolia People's Congress
- Incumbent
- Assumed office 18 October 2025
- Preceded by: Sun Shaocheng

Governor of Guangdong
- In office 27 December 2021 – 11 October 2025
- Secretary: Li Xi; Huang Kunming
- Preceded by: Ma Xingrui
- Succeeded by: Meng Fanli

Specifically-designated Deputy Party Secretary of Guangdong
- In office 14 December 2018 – 24 December 2021
- Secretary: Li Xi
- Preceded by: Ren Xuefeng
- Succeeded by: Meng Fanli

Party Secretary of Shenzhen
- In office March 2017 – December 2021
- Preceded by: Xu Qin
- Succeeded by: Meng Fanli

Party Secretary of Taiyuan
- In office November 2016 – March 2017
- Preceded by: Wu Zhenglong
- Succeeded by: Luo Qingyu

Personal details
- Born: March 13, 1962 (age 64) Shuozhou, Shanxi, China
- Party: Chinese Communist Party
- Education: Tsinghua University
- Profession: Water Resources Engineer

Chinese name
- Simplified Chinese: 王伟中
- Traditional Chinese: 王偉中
Transcriptions
Standard Mandarin
- Hanyu Pinyin: Wáng Wěizhōng
- Wade–Giles: Wang Wei-chung
Yue: Cantonese
- Jyutping: Wong4 wai5 zung1

Wang Weizhong (Chinese: 王伟中; born March 1962) is a Chinese politician currently serving as Party Secretary of Inner Mongolia. A graduate of Tsinghua University, Wang rose through the ranks working for the Ministry of Science and Technology. He previously served as the Party Secretary of Taiyuan, Shenzhen and Governor of Guangdong Province.

== Biography ==
Wang is a native of Shuozhou, Shanxi province. In September 1984, he graduated from the department of hydraulic engineering at Tsinghua University. In April 1987, he earned a master's degree. He spent much of the next decade working for the ministry overseeing water resources. In August 1991 he was transferred to the National Science Commission (the later Ministry of Science and Technology) to work on matters related to the environment.

In August 1994, Wang entered the ecology division of the National Science Commission. In July 1998, he was made head of the China 21st Century Agenda Management Center (中国21世纪议程管理中心) and the head of the Life Science Technology Development Center. In March 2006, he was named head of the finance department at the Ministry of Science and Technology. In April 2010, he was promoted to Vice Minister of Science and Technology.

In September 2014, Wang was 'parachuted' to his home province Shanxi to handle the clean-up of the political scene after many senior level politicians had been placed under investigation as part of the anti-corruption campaign under Xi Jinping. He was first named secretary-general of the party organization and a member of the provincial party standing committee. In October 2016, Wang was named Chinese Communist Party Committee Secretary of Taiyuan, the provincial capital.

In April 2017, Wang was named a member of the Guangdong provincial standing committee and party chief of Shenzhen.

On December 14, 2018, Wang rose to become deputy party secretary of Guangdong. In December 2021, he became governor of Guangdong, replacing Ma Xingrui.

In October 2022, he became a member of the 20th Central Committee of the Chinese Communist Party.

In September 2025, Wang was appointed Party Secretary of Inner Mongolia.

Party political offices
Preceded by Nie Chunyu	Secretary-General of Shanxi Provincial Committee of the Chinese Communist Party; 2014–2016	Succeeded by Luo Qingyu
Preceded by Wu Zhenglong	Party Secretary of Taiyuan; 2016–2017	Succeeded by Luo Qingyu
Preceded by Xu Qin	Party Secretary of Shenzhen; 2017–2021	Succeeded by Meng Fanli
Preceded by Ren Xuefeng	Deputy Party Secretary of Guangdong; 2018–2021	Succeeded by Meng Fanli
Preceded by Sun Shaocheng	Party Secretary of Inner Mongolia; 2025–present	Incumbent
Government offices
Preceded by Ma Xingrui	Governor of Guangdong; 2021–2025	Succeeded by Meng Fanli
