= Anhui Provincial Committee of the Chinese People's Political Consultative Conference =

Chinese provincial government advisory body

Anhui Provincial Committee of the Chinese People's Political Consultative Conference 中国人民政治协商会议安徽省委员会
- 13th
- Emblem of the Chinese People's Political Consultative Conference

Type
- Type: United front organ Constitutional convention (Historical); Legislature (Historical) of Chinese People's Political Consultative Conference

History
- Founded: January 1955; 71 years ago
- Preceded by: Anhui Provincial People's Congress Consultative Committee

Leadership
- Chairperson: Zhang Ximing

Website
- www.ahzx.gov.cn

Chinese name
- Simplified Chinese: 中国人民政治协商会议安徽省委员会
- Traditional Chinese: 中國人民政治協商會議安徽省委員會
Transcriptions
Standard Mandarin
- Hanyu Pinyin: Zhōngguó Rénmín Zhèngzhì Xiéshāng Huìyì ānhuīshěng Wěiyuánhuì

Abbreviation
- Simplified Chinese: 安徽省政协
- Traditional Chinese: 安徽省政協
- Literal meaning: CPPCC Anhui Provincial Committee
Transcriptions
Standard Mandarin
- Hanyu Pinyin: ānhuīshěng Zhèngxié

The Anhui Provincial Committee of the Chinese People's Political Consultative Conference (Chinese: 中国人民政治协商会议安徽省委员会) is the provincial advisory body and a local organization of the Chinese People's Political Consultative Conference in Anhui, China. It is supervised and directed by the Anhui Provincial Committee of the Chinese Communist Party.

== History ==
The Anhui Provincial Committee of the Chinese People's Political Consultative Conference traces its origins to the Consultative Committee of People's Congresses from All Walks of Life in Wanbei District (皖北区各界人民代表会议协商委员会) and the Consultative Committee of People's Congresses from All Walks of Life in Wanbei District (皖南区各界人民代表会议协商委员会), founded in October 1949 and June 1950, respectively.

=== Anti-corruption campaign ===
Vice chairman Zhou Xi'an was put under investigation for alleged "serious violations of discipline and laws" by the Central Commission for Discipline Inspection (CCDI), the party's internal disciplinary body, and the National Supervisory Commission, the highest anti-corruption agency of China.

== Term ==
=== 1st ===
- Term: February 1955–November 1958
- Chairperson: Zeng Xisheng
- Vice Chairpersons: Li Yunhe, Yu Yanong, Chen Yinnan, Cheng Shifan, Yao Ke, Fang Zhiwu, Gui Linqi (June 1956–), Dai Ji (June 1956–), Guang Mingfu (April 1957–)

=== 2nd ===
- Term: November 1958–September 1964
- Chairperson: Zeng Xisheng → Li Baohua (July 1962–)
- Vice Chairpersons: Gui Linqi, Yu Yanong, Chen Yinnan, Yao Ke, Fang Zhiwu, Dai Ji, Guang Mingfu, Huang Yaonan (May 1960–), Lü Jifang (May 1960–), Li Yunhe (July 1962–), Zhu Zifan (July 1962–)

=== 3rd ===
- Term: September 1964–January 1978
- Chairperson: Li Baohua
- Vice Chairpersons: Zhang Kaifan, Yao Ke, Dai Ji, Li Yunhe, Fang Zhiwu, Lü Jifang, Zhu Zifan

=== 4th ===
- Term: January 1978–April 1983
- Chairperson: Gu Zhuoxin → Zhang Kaifan (January 1980–)
- Vice Chairpersons: Li Shinong, Zhang Kaifan, Huang Yan, Gui Peng, Wei Jianzhang, Wu Yanqiu, Peng Zongzhu, Qian Junrui, Liu Rulin, Fang Shiliang, Wang Zhong, Li Fanfu, Wang Zenong, Fang Qikun, Chai Dengbang, Sun Youqiao, Yang Jiabao (January 1980–), Zhao Minxue (January 1980–), Pan Ezhang (January 1980–), Gong Yinong (March 1981–), Liu Zhenwen (March 1981–), Cao Zhenqiu (March 1981–), Gao Hong (March 1981–), Chen Tianren (March 1981–), Ma Leting (March 1981–), Zhu Nong (March 1982–), Hu Xiguang (March 1982–), Fang Xiangming (March 1982–)

=== 5th ===
- Term: April 1983–February 1988
- Chairperson: Zhang Kaifan → Yang Haibo (March 1985–April 1986) → Shi Junjie (April 1986–)
- Vice Chairpersons: Sun Zongrong, Li Qingquan, Wu Yanqiu, Fang Shiliang, Hong Pei, Zhu Nong, Wang Zenong, Chai Dengbang, Sun Youqiao, Pan Ezhang, Zheng Jiaqi, Cao Zhenqiu, Chen Tianren, Lai Shaoqi, Ma Leting, Ding Jizhe (March 1985–), Guang Renhong (March 1985–), Teng Maotong (March 1985–), Li Jixiang (April 1986–), Meng Yiqi (April 1986–)

=== 6th ===
- Term: February 1988–February 1993
- Chairperson: Shi Junjie
- Vice Chairpersons: Xu Leyi, Ma Leting, Wang Zenong, Liu Yiping, Guang Renhong, Sun Youqiao, Meng Yiqi, Teng Maotong, Pan Ezhang, Cao Zhenqiu, Zhao Huaishou (April 1989–), Li Mingjun (March 1992–)

=== 7th ===
- Term: February 1993–January 1998
- Chairperson: Shi Junjie (–February 1996) → Lu Rongjing (February 1996–)
- Vice Chairpersons: Long Nian, Wang Sheyun, Qian Jingsren, Yue Shucang, Li Mingjun, Rong Guanghong, Song Ming, Xu Rongnan, Wu Dongzhi, Xu Xueshou, Zhang Runxia (February 1997–), Qin Dewen (February 1997–)

=== 8th ===
- Term: January 1998–January 2003
- Chairperson: Lu Rongjing
- Vice Chairpersons: Du Cheng, Zhang Runxia, Ji Jiahong, Yue Shucang, Qin Dewen, Chen Xinzhao, Fang Zhaoben, Yu Zupeng, Wang He Ling

=== 9th ===
- Term: January 2003–January 2008
- Chairperson: Fang Zhaoxiang
- Vice Chairpersons: Qin Dewen, Lu Jiafeng, Chen Xinzhao, Fang Zhaoben, Yu Zupeng, Wang He Ling, Zhan Qiuping, Zheng Mumin, Zhao Peigen, Liu Guangfu

=== 10th ===
- Term: January 2008–January 2013
- Chairperson: Yang Duoliang
- Vice Chairpersons: Tian Weiqian, Zheng Mumin, Fang Zhaoben, Wang He Ling, Liu Guangfu, Zhang Xueping, Li Hongta, Zhao Han
- Secretary-General: Bai Taiping

=== 11th ===
- Term: January 2013–January 2018
- Chairperson: Wang Mingfang
- Vice Chairpersons: Wang Xiufang, Zhang Xueping, Zhao Han, Li Weihua, Xia Tao, Han Xiancong, Tong Huaiwei, Li Xiusong, Niu Liwen
- Secretary-General: Wang Qimin

=== 12th ===
- Term: January 2018–January 2023
- Chairperson: Zhang Chang'er (–January 2022) → Tang Liangzhi (January 2022–)
- Vice Chairpersons: Xia Tao, Li Xiusong, Niu Liwen, Xiao Chaoying, Han Jun, Sun Lifang, Zheng Hong, Li Heping, Zheng Yongfei, Liu Li (January 2020–), Yao Yuzhou (January 2020–), Deng Xiangyang (January 2021–), Sun Yunfei (January 2022–)
- Secretary-General: Che Dun'an

=== 13th ===
- Term: January 2023–2028
- Chairperson: Tang Liangzhi (–February 2026) → Zhang Ximing (February 2026–)
- Vice Chairpersons: Sun Yunfei, Zhou Xi'an (–February 2025), Zheng Hong, Li Heping, Zheng Yongfei, Zhang Xiang'an, Tao Yisheng, Ma Chuanxi, Chen Shun (January 2024–), Luo Ping (January 2024–), Zhang Ximing (January 2025–February 2026), Yu Aihua (January 2025–)
