= Politics of Anhui =

Politics of a province of China

The politics of Anhui Province in the People's Republic of China is structured in a dual party-government system like all other governing institutions in mainland China.

The Governor of Anhui (安徽省省长) is the highest-ranking official in the People's Government of Anhui. However, in the province's dual party-government governing system, the Governor has less power than the Anhui Chinese Communist Party Provincial Committee Secretary (安徽省委书记), colloquially termed the "Anhui Party Chief".

== List of provincial-level leaders ==
=== Chinese Communist Party secretaries ===
Image	Name (English)	Name (Chinese)	Term start	Term end	Ref.
	Zeng Xisheng	曾希圣	January 1952	February 1962	
	Li Baohua	李葆华	February 1962	January 1967	
	Li Desheng	李德生	November 1969	December 1974	
	Song Peizhang	宋佩璋	May 1975	June 1977	
	Wan Li	万里	June 1977	March 1980	
	Zhang Jingfu	张劲夫	March 1980	April 1982	
	Zhou Zijian	周子健	April 1982	March 1983	
	Huang Huang	黄璜	March 1983	April 1986	
	Li Guixian	李贵鲜	April 1986	April 1988	
	Lu Rongjing	卢荣景	April 1988	September 1998	
	Hui Liangyu	回良玉	11 September 1998	31 October 2001	
	Wang Taihua	王太华	31 October 2001	16 December 2004	
	Guo Jinlong	郭金龙	16 December 2004	1 December 2007	
	Wang Jinshan	王金山	1 December 2007	31 May 2010	
	Zhang Baoshun	张宝顺	31 May 2010	1 June 2015	
	Wang Xuejun	王学军	1 June 2015	29 August 2016	
	Li Jinbin	李锦斌	29 August 2016	30 September 2021	
	Zheng Shanjie	郑栅洁	30 September 2021	14 March 2023	
	Han Jun	韩俊	14 March 2023	28 June 2024	
	Liang Yanshun	梁言顺	28 June 2024	23 September 2026	
	Li Lecheng	李乐成	23 September 2026	Incumbent	

=== Chairpersons of Anhui People's Congress ===
1. Gu Zhouxin (顾卓新): 1979–1983
2. Yang Weiping (杨蔚屏): 1983–1985
3. Wang Guangyu (王光宇): 1985–1993
4. Meng Fulin (孟富林): 1993–2003
5. Wang Taihua (王太华): 2003–2004
6. Guo Jinlong (郭金龙): 2005–2008
7. Wang Jinshan (王金山): 2008–2010
8. Zhang Baoshun (张宝顺): 2010–2015
9. Wang Xuejun (王学军): 2015–2016
10. Li Jinbin (李锦斌): 2016–2022
11. Zheng Shanjie(郑栅洁): 2022–present

=== Governors ===
1. Zeng Xisheng (曾希圣): 1952–1955
2. Huang Yan (黄岩): 1955–1967
3. Li Desheng (李德生): 1968–1974 (Chairman of the Revolutionary Committee)
4. Song Peizhang (宋佩璋): 1975–1978 (Chairman of the Revolutionary Committee)
5. Wan Li (万里): 1978–1979
6. Zhang Jingfu (张劲夫): 1979–1981
7. Zhou Zijian (周子健): 1981–1983
8. Wang Yuzhao (王郁昭): 1983–1987
9. Lu Rongjing (卢荣景): 1987–1989
10. Fu Xishou (傅锡寿): 1989–1994
11. Hui Liangyu (回良玉): 1994–1998
12. Wang Taihua (王太华): 1998–2000
13. Xu Zhonglin (许仲林): 2000–2002
14. Wang Jinshan (王金山): 2002–2007
15. Wang Sanyun (王三运): 2007–2011
16. Li Bin (李斌): 2011–2013
17. Wang Xuejun (王学军): 2013–2015
18. Li Jinbin (李锦斌): 2015–2016
19. Li Guoying (李国英): 2016–2021
20. Wang Qingxian (王清宪): 2021–2026
21. Wang Dongwei (王东伟): 2026 - present

=== Chairpersons of CPPCC Anhui Committee ===
1. Zeng Xisheng (曾希圣): 1955–1962
2. Li Baohua (李葆华): 1962–1967
3. Gu Zhuoxin (顾卓新): 1978–1979
4. Zhang Kaifan (张凯帆): 1979–1984
5. Yang Haibo (杨海波): 1984–1985
6. Shi Junjie (史钧杰): 1985–1996
7. Lu Rongjing (卢荣景): 1996–2000
8. Fang Zhaoxiang (方兆祥): 2000–2007
9. Yang Duoliang (杨多良): 2007–2011
10. Wang Mingfang (王明方): 2011–2017
11. Xu Liquan (徐立全): 2017–2018
12. Zhang Chang'er (张昌尔): 2018–2021
13. Tang Liangzhi (唐良智): 2021–2026
14. Zhang Ximing (张西明): 2026 - present
