= Governor of Anhui =

Governor of the Anhui Provincial People's Government
- 安徽省人民政府省长
- National Emblem of China

- Flag of China

- Incumbent; Wang Dongwei; Acting since 23 September 2026
- Anhui Provincial People's Government
- Type: Governor
- Status: Provincial and ministerial-level official
- Reports to: Anhui Provincial People's Congress and its Standing Committee
- Nominator: Presidium of the Anhui Provincial People's Congress
- Appointer: Anhui Provincial People's Congress
- Term length: Five years, renewable
- Inaugural holder: Song Renqiong
- Formation: February 1949
- Deputy: Deputy Governors; Secretary-General

The governor of Anhui, officially the Governor of the Anhui Provincial People's Government, is the head of Anhui Province and leader of the Anhui Provincial People's Government.

The governor is elected by the Anhui Provincial People's Congress, and responsible to it and its Standing Committee. The governor is a provincial level official and is responsible for the overall decision-making of the provincial government. The governor is assisted by an executive vice governor as well as several vice governors. The governor generally serves as the deputy secretary of the Anhui Provincial Committee of the Chinese Communist Party and as a member of the CCP Central Committee. The governor is the second highest-ranking official in the province after the secretary of the CCP Anhui Committee. The current acting governor is Wang Dongwei, who took office on 23 September 2026.

== List of governors ==
=== People's Republic of China ===
Portrait	Name (English)	Name (Chinese)	Term start	Term end	Ref.
	Song Renqiong	宋任穷	February 1949	December 1949	
	Zeng Xisheng	曾希圣	December 1949	March 1955	
	Huang Yan	黄岩	March 1955	April 1967	
	Qian Jun	钱钧	April 1967	April 1968	
	Li Desheng	李德生	April 1968	December 1973	
	Song Peizhang	宋佩璋	May 1975	June 1977	
	Wan Li	万里	June 1977	December 1979	
	Zhang Jingfu	张劲夫	December 1979	March 1981	
	Zhou Zijian	周子健	March 1981	April 1983	
	Wang Yuzhao	王郁昭	April 1983	June 1987	
	Lu Rongjing	卢荣景	June 1987	April 1989	
	Fu Xishou	傅锡寿	April 1989	December 1994	
	Hui Liangyu	回良玉	December 1994	October 1998	
	Wang Taihua	王太华	October 1998	January 2000	
	Xu Zhonglin	许仲林	January 2000	October 2002	
	Wang Jinshan	王金山	October 2002	December 2007	
	Wang Sanyun	王三运	December 2007	December 2011	
	Li Bin	李斌	December 2011	March 2013	
	Wang Xuejun	王学军	March 2013	June 2015	
	Li Jinbin	李锦斌	June 2015	September 2016	
	Li Guoying	李国英	September 2016	1 February 2021	
	Wang Qingxian	王清宪	1 February 2021	23 September 2026	
	Wang Dongwei; Acting	王东伟	23 September 2026	Incumbent	
