= Zhou Xi'an =

Chinese politician

- 周喜安

Vice Chairman of the Anhui Provincial Committee of the Chinese People's Political Consultative Conference
- In office January 2023 – February 2025
- Chairman: Tang Liangzhi

Vice Governor of Anhui
- In office January 2018 – January 2023
- Governor: Li Guoying; Wang Qingxian

Personal details
- Born: August 1963 (age 63) Xinye County, Henan, China
- Party: Chinese Communist Party (1988–2025; expelled)
- Education: Jilin University

Zhou Xi'an (Chinese: 周喜安; pinyin: Zhōu Xǐ'ān; born August 1963) is a former Chinese politician who served as vice governor of Anhui from 2018 to 2023 and vice chairman of the Anhui Provincial Committee of the Chinese People's Political Consultative Conference from 2023 to 2025. As of February 2025 he was under investigation by China's top anti-graft watchdog.

Zhou was a representative of the 19th National Congress of the Chinese Communist Party and was a delegate to the 12th National People's Congress.

== Early life and education ==
Zhou was born in Xinye County, Henan, in August 1963. In 1981, he enrolled at Jilin University, where he majored in political economics. He joined the Chinese Communist Party (CCP) in April 1988.

== Career ==
After university in June 1988, Zhou was assigned to the Development Strategy Research Center of the Ministry of Light Industry.

Starting in July 1992, Zhou served in several posts in the Office of Policy Research (later was reshuffled as the Policies and Regulations Department) of the State Planning Commission (now National Development and Reform Commission), including deputy director of Development Policy Division, deputy director of the International Economic Research Division, director of the Comprehensive Division, and deputy director of the Research Division.

Zhou was leader of the Comprehensive Group of the National Energy Leading Group Office in June 2006 and subsequently director of the Comprehensive Department of the National Energy Administration in August 2008.

In November 2010, Zhou was transferred to southwest China's Sichuan province and appointed acting mayor and deputy party secretary of Bazhong. He was installed as mayor in February 2011. He was party secretary of Ziyang, the top political position in the city in November 2014, in addition to serving as chairperson of the Municipal People's Congress.

Zhou was elevated to vice governor of Anhui in January 2018, a post he kept until January 2023, when he was chosen as vice chairman of the Anhui Provincial Committee of the Chinese People's Political Consultative Conference.

== Downfall ==
On 6 February 2025, Zhou was put under investigation for alleged "serious violations of discipline and laws" by the Central Commission for Discipline Inspection (CCDI), the party's internal disciplinary body, and the National Supervisory Commission, the highest anti-corruption agency of China. On July 30, he was stripped of his posts within the CCP and in the public office. On November 18, he was indicted on suspicion of accepting bribes.

On 7 May 2026, Zhou was sentenced to death with a two-year reprieve for bribery in 134 million yuan.

Government offices
Preceded by Pu Bo	Mayor of Bazhong; 2010–2014	Succeeded by Feng Jian
Party political offices
Preceded by Li Jia	Communist Party Secretary of Ziyang; 2014–2018	Succeeded by Chen Jiming
