= Wang Yong (politician, born 1957) =

Chinese politician

- 王勇

Vice-Chairman of the Hainan Provincial Committee of the Chinese People's Political Consultative Conference (CPPCC)
- In office January 2016 – 31 August 2020
- Chairman: Mao Wanchun

Head of the United Front Work Department of CCP Hainan Provincial Committee
- In office 31 October 2014 – April 2017
- Preceded by: Wang Yingji
- Succeeded by: Zhang Yunsheng

Mayor of Sanya
- In office 27 September 2008 – 17 November 2014
- Preceded by: Lu Zhiyuan
- Succeeded by: Wu Yanjun

Head of the Hainan Provincial Transport Department
- In office 23 February 2005 – 28 November 2008
- Preceded by: Li Zhiyong
- Succeeded by: Dong Xianzeng

Communist Party Secretary of Chengmai County
- In office March 2000 – January 2005
- Succeeded by: Zhang Zuorong

Personal details
- Born: February 1957 (age 69) Yanggu County, Shandong, China
- Party: Chinese Communist Party (expelled; 1976-2020)
- Education: Beizhen Normal College; Central Party School of the Chinese Communist Party; Cheung Kong Graduate School of Business

Wang Yong (Chinese: 王勇; pinyin: Wáng Yǒng; born February 1957) is a former Chinese politician who spent his entire career in both Shandong and Hainan provinces. He was investigated by China's top anti-graft agency in July 2020. Previously he served as vice-chairman of the Hainan Provincial Committee of the Chinese People's Political Consultative Conference (CPPCC). He entered the workforce in January 1973, and joined the Chinese Communist Party in July 1976. He was a delegate to the 12th National People's Congress.

== Early life and education ==
Wang was born in Yanggu County, Shandong, in February 1957. During the late Cultural Revolution, he briefly worked as a sent-down youth in the whole of 1973. In December 1973, he attended Yanggu County No.1 High School. A year and a half later, he became a sent-down youth again and worked until December 1976, when he joined the Liaocheng Electric Machinery Factory as a worker and political work official. After the resumption of college entrance examination, in September 1978, he was admitted to Beizhen Normal College, where he majored in Chinese.

== Career in Shandong ==
After graduating in June 1980, he became an official in the Organization Department of Huimin County. Ten months later, he was promoted to deputy secretary of Yanggu County Committee of the Communist Youth League of China. Subsequently, he worked in the Organization Department of Shandong Provincial Committee of the Communist Youth League of China from September 1983 to February 1987, and he served as both deputy head of the Organization Department and the United Front Work Department between February 1987 and April 1991.

== Career in Hainan ==
In August 1991, he was transferred to south China's Hainan Island and appointed secretary of the Discipline Inspection Commission of Hainan Machinery Industry Corporation. Three months later, he concurrently served as deputy party chief. After the institutional reform as Hainan Machinery Industry Bureau, he served as deputy director in March 1993. In July 1996, he was assigned to Hainan Social Security Bureau as deputy director, a position he held until February 2000. After a month as assistant inspector of the Department of Personnel and Labor Security, he was promoted to become party chief of Chengmai County. It would be his first job as "first-in-charge" of a county. During his term in office, he studied at the Central Party School of the Chinese Communist Party as a part-time student. He was head and party branch secretary of the Hainan Provincial Transport Department in February 2005, and held that office until November 2008. During his tenure, he studied economic management at the Central Party School of the Chinese Communist Party and public management at senior classes started jointly by Tsinghua University and Harvard University. He was appointed deputy party chief of Sanya in September 2008, concurrently holding the mayor position. In this position, he studied business administration at Cheung Kong Graduate School of Business and attended a training class for young and middle aged cadres run by the Central Party School of the Chinese Communist Party. In October 2014, he became head of the United Front Work Department of CPC Hainan Provincial Committee, but having held the position for only more than a year. In January 2016, he rose to become vice-chairman of the Hainan Provincial Committee of the Chinese People's Political Consultative Conference (CPPCC).

== Investigation ==
On July 13, 2020, he was put under investigation for alleged "serious violations of discipline and laws" by the Central Commission for Discipline Inspection (CCDI), the party's internal disciplinary body, and the National Supervisory Commission, the highest anti-corruption agency of China.

On January 11, 2021, he has been expelled from the CCP and dismissed from public office. On May 13, he stood trial at the Intermediate People's Court of Guilin on charges of taking bribes. According to the indictment, he allegedly took advantage of his positions in Hainan to seek benefits for others in project approval and contracting and career promotions between 2000 and 2014. He was charged with accepting money and property worth about 90.5 million yuan ($14.1 million) either by himself or through some of his close relatives. On October 28, he was sentenced to life imprisonment for taking bribes worth about 90.5 million yuan ($14.1 million). The money and property that Wang had received in the form of bribes, as well as any interest arising from them, will be turned over to the national treasury.

Party political offices
Preceded by ?	Communist Party Secretary of Chengmai County; 2000-2005	Succeeded by Zhang Zuorong (张作荣)
Preceded by Wang Yingji	Head of the United Front Work Department of CCP Hainan Provincial Committee; 2014-2017	Succeeded by Zhang Yunsheng
Government offices
Preceded by Li Zhiyong (李执勇)	Head of the Hainan Provincial Transport Department; 2005-2008	Succeeded by Dong Xianzeng (董宪曾)
Preceded by Lu Zhiyuan	Mayor of Sanya; 2008-2014	Succeeded by Wu Yanjun
