= Yao Yuzhou =

Chinese politician (born 1960)

- 姚玉舟

Vice Chairperson of the Anhui Provincial Committee of the Chinese People's Political Consultative Conference
- In office January 2020 – January 2023

Secretary of the Political and Legal Affairs Commission of the Anhui Provincial Committee of the Chinese Communist Party
- In office November 2016 – December 2020
- Preceded by: Xu Liquan
- Succeeded by: Zhang Yunsheng

Personal details
- Born: March 1960 (age 66) Zongyang County, Anhui, China
- Party: Chinese Communist Party (1987-)
- Education: Huainan Normal College

Yao Yuzhou (Chinese: 姚玉舟; born March 1960) is a former Chinese politician, who was served as the vice chairperson of the Anhui Provincial Committee of the Chinese People's Political Consultative Conference from 2020 to 2023, and the Secretary of the Political and Legal Affairs Commission of the Anhui Provincial Committee of the Chinese Communist Party from 2016 to 2020. He was a delegate to the 18th and 19th National Congress of the Chinese Communist Party, and a delegate to the 11th National People's Congress.

== Career ==
Yao Yuzhou was born in Zongyang County, Anhui. He was served as a teacher of Yangqiao High School in Dongzhi County in 1979. In 1980, Yao was enrolled to mathematics major of Huainan Normal College, and graduated in 1982. After graduating, he was served as a teacher of Huainan No.8 High School, and the deputy secretary of the School Youth League Committee. Later he was served as the deputy secretary of the Datong District Youth League Committee, and promoted to the secretary. In 1990, he was served as the deputy secretary of the Huainan Municipal Youth League Committee, and promoted to the secretary in 1992. He was also temporary served as the deputy party secretary of Wuqing County in Tianjin in 1993, and the deputy party secretary of Fengtai County from 1993 to 1994.

In 1995, Yao was served as the deputy secretary of the Anhui Provincial Youth League Committee. In April 2001, he was served as the deputy party secretary of Ma'anshan, and appointed as the mayor after two years. He was appointed the party secretary of Tongling in 2008, and the party secretary of Xuancheng in 2013. In August 2016, he was appointed the party secretary of Chuzhou, and he was appointed the standing member of the Anhui Provincial Committee of the Chinese Communist Party after three months. Later he was appointed the secretary of the Anhui Provincial Political and Legal Affairs Commission.

In January 2020, Yao was appointed as the vice chairperson of the Anhui Provincial Committee of the Chinese People's Political Consultative Conference. In January 2023, Yao was resigned the post due to retiring age.

== Investigation ==
On 9 April 2026, Yao was suspected of "serious violations of laws and regulations" by the Central Commission for Discipline Inspection (CCDI), the party's internal disciplinary body, and the National Supervisory Commission, the highest anti-corruption agency of China.

Party political offices
Preceded by Xu Liquan	Secretary of the Political and Legal Affairs Commission of the Anhui Provincial Committee of the Chinese Communist Party; 2016－2020	Succeeded by Zhang Yunsheng
