= Chen Shun =

Chinese politician (born 1964)

Chen Shun (Chinese: 陈舜), born in February 1964, is a Chinese politician from Zhenxiong, Yunnan Province.

He has held the positions of member of the Standing Committee of the Henan Provincial Committee of the Chinese Communist Party and Minister of the Organization Department, as well as member of the Standing Committee of the Anhui Provincial Committee of the Chinese Communist Party and Minister of its Publicity Department.

== Biography ==
In July 1981, Chen Shun pursued theoretical physics at the Physics Department of Yunnan University. He obtained a master's degree in statistics from the Economics Department of Yunnan University in July 1985. In September 1987, he became a cadre at the Yunnan Population and Economic and Social Development Strategy Research Center (Chinese: 云南省人口与经济社会发展战略研究中心). He commenced his role as a teacher at Yunnan College of Finance and Trade in September 1988. Chen earned a doctoral degree from the Institute of International Economics at Nankai University in September 1991, followed by another doctoral degree from the same institute in September 1994. In September 1994, he served as a researcher at the Postdoctoral Mobile Station of Fudan University.

In December 1996, he commenced his tenure at the China Securities Regulatory Commission (CSRC) as a cadre in the Office of General Affairs. In June 1997, he advanced to researcher within the same office. By December 1998, he attained the position of deputy director of the Information Center. In November 2000, he was appointed deputy director of the Market Supervision Department. In April 2004, he became deputy director of the Second Bureau of Inspection, and later that November, he was promoted to director of the same bureau. In January 2006, he was appointed director of the First Bureau of Inspection, a position he held until November 2007, when he was reappointed as director of the First Bureau of Inspection. In November 2007, he was designated as the Chief Inspector of the China Securities Regulatory Commission (CSRC). During this period, he spearheaded the investigation and resolution of the "Delong case" (Chinese: 德隆事件), regarded as the largest financial securities case in China, culminating in a final penalty of 10.3 billion yuan.

In May 2011, he assumed the role of Director of the General Office of the Ministry of Education of the People's Republic of China. In March 2012, he assumed the role of Assistant Minister in the Ministry of Education.

In November 2016, he assumed the role of vice governor and joined the party group of the People's Government of Yunnan Province. In February 2021, he was appointed as a member of the Standing Committee of the CCP Yunnan Provincial Committee and served as Secretary-General. In September 2021, he was appointed to the Standing Committee of the CCP Henan Provincial Committee and served as the Minister of the Organization Department. In April 2023, he was appointed to the Standing Committee of the CCP Anhui Provincial Committee and assumed the role of Minister of its Publicity Department. In January 2024, he was appointed Vice-Chairman of the 13th Anhui Provincial Committee of the Chinese People's Political Consultative Conference.

Party political offices
| Previous: Guo Qiang | Minister of the Publicity Department of the CCP Anhui Provincial Committee | Next: Qian Sanxiong |
| Previous: Kong Changsheng | Minister of the Organization Department of the CCP Henan Provincial Committee | Next: Wang Gang (1969 born) |
| Previous: Liu Huiyan | Secretary-General of the CCP Yunnan Provincial Committee | Next: Cui Maohu |
Government offices
| Previous: Mou Yangchun | Director, General Office of the Ministry of Education of the People's Republic of China | Next: Liu Dawei |
