= Wan Li =

Chinese Communist Party leader (1916–2015)

- 万里

5th Chairman of the Standing Committee of the National People's Congress
- In office 8 April 1988 – 27 March 1993
- Preceded by: Peng Zhen
- Succeeded by: Qiao Shi
- Preceded by: Zhao Ziyang

Vice Premier of China (Note: Wan Li was between 20 December 1982 and 18 January 1983 and again between c. 6 June 1985 and c. 11 June 1985, in his capacity as Vice Premier the acting premier.)
- In office 16 April 1980 – 9 April 1988
- Premier: Zhao Ziyang; Li Peng

3rd Minister of Railways
- In office January 1975 – December 1976
- Preceded by: Lü Zhengcao
- Succeeded by: Duan Junyi

Party Secretary of Anhui
- In office June 1977 – March 1980
- Preceded by: Song Peizhang
- Succeeded by: Zhang Jingfu

Governor of Anhui
- In office June 1977 – December 1979
- Preceded by: Song Peizhang
- Succeeded by: Zhang Jingfu

Director of the State Agricultural Commission
- In office August 1980 – May 1982

Secretary of the Beijing Municipal Committee of the CCP
- In office May 1973 – January 1975

Minister of Urban Construction
- In office May 1956 – February 1958

Vice Mayor of Beijing
- In office August 1958 – June 1966

Secretary of the Secretariat of the Beijing Municipal Committee of the CCP
- In office March 1958 – October 1966

Director of the State Council's Urban Construction Bureau
- In office April 1955 – c. May 1956

Vice Minister of the Ministry of Construction Engineering of the State Council
- In office 1954 – April 1955

Vice Minister of the Ministry of Construction Engineering of the Central People's Government
- In office November 1952 – c. 1954

Vice Chairman of the Beijing Municipal Committee of the Chinese People's Political Consultative Conference
- In office September 1959 – November 1977

Personal details
- Born: December 1916 Dongping County, Shandong, China
- Died: 15 July 2015 (aged 98) Beijing, China
- Party: Chinese Communist Party (since 1936)
- Spouse: Bian Tao (邊濤)
- Children: 5, including Wan Jifei
- Relatives: Wan Bao Bao (grandchild)

Wan Li
- Traditional Chinese: 萬里
- Simplified Chinese: 万里
Transcriptions
Standard Mandarin
- Hanyu Pinyin: Wàn Lǐ

Wan Li (Note: In this Chinese name, the family name is Wan (万).) (December 1916 – 15 July 2015) was a Chinese Communist revolutionary and politician who served as First Vice Premier of the People's Republic of China from 1980 to 1988, acting Premier of the People's Republic of China once in 1982–1983 and once again in 1985 and as the 5th Chairman of the Standing Committee of the National People's Congress from 1988 to 1993.

Wan joined the Chinese Communist Party in 1936 and led revolutionary and wartime resistance activities in his native Shandong province. After the founding of the communist state in 1949, Wan served in a series of government ministries, then worked as a member of the municipal leadership in Beijing. He was purged during the Cultural Revolution, but was eventually rehabilitated and returned to work as party chief of Anhui province, where he led the implementation of successful agrarian reforms centered on the household-responsibility system. In the 1980s, Wan became one of the leading moderate reformers in China's top leadership, advocating for constitutional reforms, the strengthening of legislative institutions, and the abolition of 'lifelong-terms' of top political leaders. He was named head of the national legislature (i.e., the NPC) in 1988. He retired in 1993. Wan Li was a proponent of Socialism with Chinese characteristics and even influenced it with his policies.

== Early life and education ==
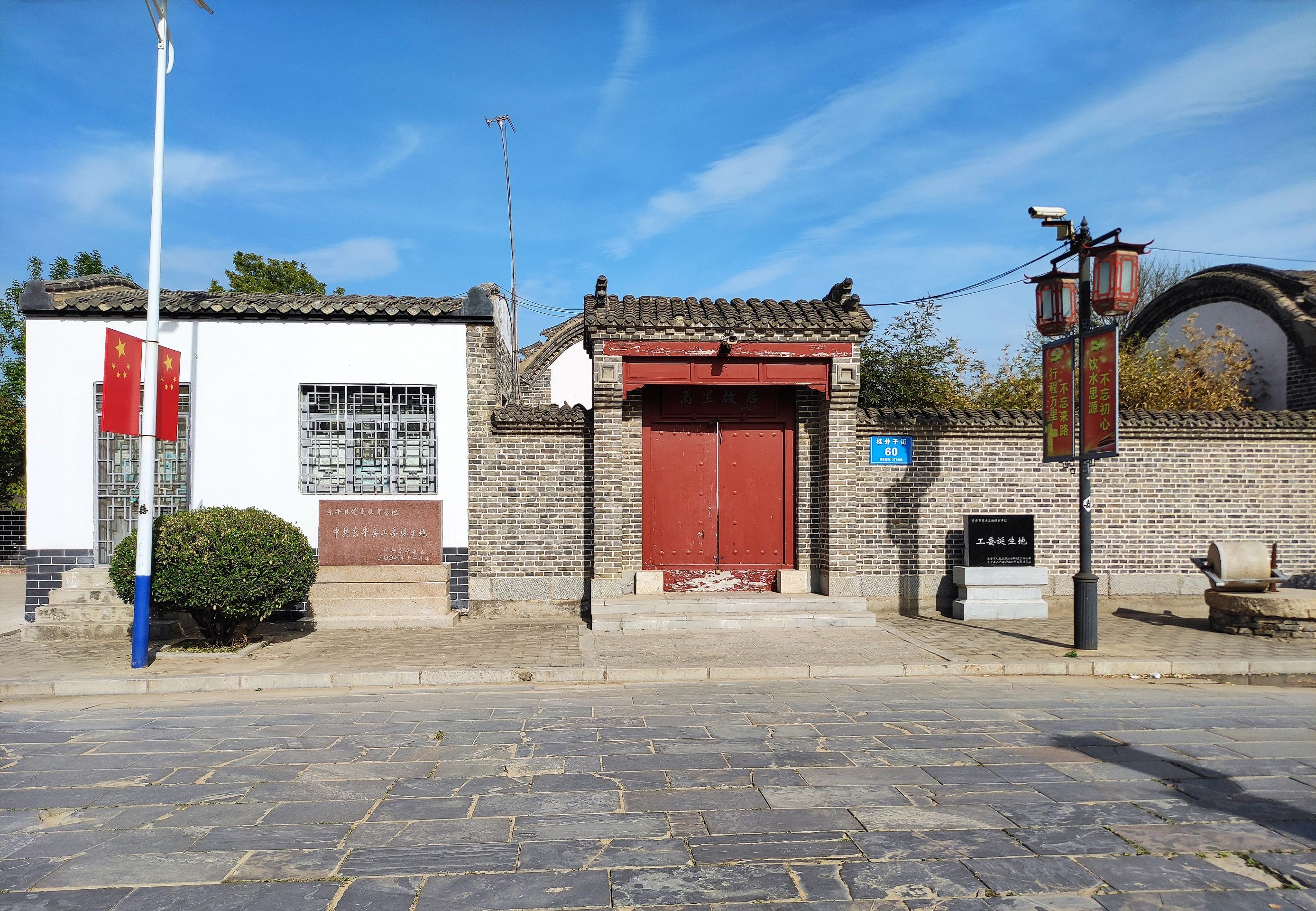
Wan Li's former residence, located in Dongping County, Shandong Province. Now it has become a patriotic education base.

Wan was born to an impoverished family in Zhoucheng Subdistrict, Dongping County, Shandong province. Wan aspired to become educated from a young age, and was admitted to a provincial-run teacher's college located in Qufu in 1939. After joining the school, Wan founded a book club to study Marxist–Leninist works. After the student-led December 9th Movement, revolutionary and anti-Japanese fervour spread across campuses all over China, motivating youth to take up the cause for the country's future. Wan returned to his native Dongping County and became a part-time teacher while devoting most of his time to the revolution and agitating for resistance against Japanese invaders.

Wan Li joined the Chinese Communist Party (CCP) in 1936, and served in party administrative positions, many in Shandong province, from county level on up. Wan led the party organization in his native Dongping County in between 1937 and 1938, Propaganda and Organization Department director in Taixi Prefecture in 1938–40, deputy head of propaganda for Western Shandong regional CCP committee in 1940, and Secretary of the party's 2nd, 7th and 8th Prefectural Committees in the Hebei-Shandong-Henan Border Area in 1940–47. In the last phases of the Civil War, Wan Li served as Secretary-General of the Border Area committee (1947–49).

== Early People's Republic ==
After the establishment of the People's Republic of China in 1949, Wan was named deputy director of the finance department of the Nanjing Municipality Military Control Committee, director of the Economic Department and Chief of the city Construction Bureau, all within a few months. He served as deputy director of the CCP South-west Military and Administrative Committee's Industrial Department (1949–52), where he would have encountered Deng Xiaoping, who was leading the southwest bureau at the time.

In 1952 Wan was transferred to begin work for the central authorities in Beijing. He shortly became the Vice Minister of Architectural Engineering (1953) followed by the post of Minister of Urban Construction (1955). From 1958, he was a secretary of the Beijing Municipality CCP Committee (under First Secretary Peng Zhen) and vice mayor; in 1959 he took a leading role in directing the construction of the Great Hall of the People in Beijing in preparation for the 10th anniversary celebrations of the founding of the People's Republic of China.

== Post-Cultural Revolution ==
During the Cultural Revolution, like many of his contemporaries, Wan was purged and sent into solitary interrogation, and then took part in "re-education through labour".

Wan was restored to his Beijing posts in May 1973. He was named Minister of Railways in January 1975 (to April 1976) and 1st Vice Minister of Light Industry in 1977. In May of the same year, he took over Anhui Province as CCP 1st Secretary (i.e., provincial party leader) and Chairman of the Revolutionary Committee (i.e., government).

In Anhui, Wan Li was responsible for the earliest post-Mao agrarian reform. He instituted the household-responsibility system whereby farmers divided communal lands and assigned them to individual farmers. Wan faced resistance from conservatives in Beijing who criticized his reforms as not sufficiently socialist or ineffective. Nevertheless, he pressed on with the reforms. His six guidelines (the Anhui liu tiao) relaxed controls on trading as well, permitting farmers to sell surplus produce independently. Peasants were allowed to grow vegetables on 3/10th of a mu and did not have to pay taxes on wheat and oil-bearing plants grown on private plots.

The Anhui agricultural reforms were heralded as brilliant innovations by the central government. The system implemented by Wan was followed up with reform programs led by Zhao Ziyang in Sichuan province. Along with Xi Zhongxun, Hu Yaobang, and other reformists in charge of implementing wide-ranging reforms, Wan was seen as a pioneer who made significant contributions to the national reform programmes in the 1980s, winning praise from paramount leader Deng Xiaoping. Wan Li was immortalised by the folk saying "If you want to eat rice, look for Wan Li." (Note: The original phrase in Chinese was "if you want to eat grains, look for [Zhao] Ziyang, if you want to eat rice, look for Wan Li," (要吃粮，找紫阳；要吃米，找万里))

== National politics ==
Wan was elected to the 11th Central Committee in 1977, and to the Central Committee Secretariat in February 1980, where he worked under General Secretary Hu Yaobang. In April he was made Vice Premier to fellow agrarian reformer Zhao Ziyang, and in August Wan was named Minister of the State Agricultural Commission. He was also made a member of the Standing Committee of the Chinese People's Political Consultative Conference in September of that year.

Wan served as the chair of the Five Disciplines, Four Graces and Three Loves activity committee.

Wan Li became the Vice Premier in 1984 and the Chairman of the Standing Committee of the National People's Congress in 1988. Wan supported Hu Yaobang and Zhao Ziyang in arguing to spread the household responsibility system nationwide in 1979–81. He also supported Zhao in curtailing the Anti-Spiritual Pollution Campaign in the mid-1980s.

After the January 1987 resignation of General Secretary Hu Yaobang, Wan Li was named to the interim "five man group", which essentially acted as an interim Politburo Standing Committee. Wan was one of seven individuals shortlisted as candidates for formal entry into the supreme body, due for confirmation at the 13th National Congress of the party in the autumn of 1987. However, the appointment was opposed by party elder Bo Yibo and others conservatives such as Yao Yilin. According to Zhao Ziyang's memoirs, Yao said that Wan had "offended too many people" and criticized Wan as "the type to stir up trouble when things go wrong."

Deng heeded the conservatives' opposition to Wan entering the party's foremost decision-making body, but instead suggested that Wan take on the office of the Chairman of the National People's Congress. The legislative position, while not part of the party's apex, was still a prestigious office that carried a full 'national leader' rank. Wan initially was unsure about his taking up the office, telling Deng that he was not qualified enough since he did not have a background in law. Deng replied that Wan "could always learn [on the job] and find people to assist him."

Wan was duly elected as the Chairman of the Standing Committee of the National People's Congress in 1988, succeeding Peng Zhen. He maintained this position until he retired in 1993.

=== 1989 Tiananmen Square protests and massacre ===
Wan was on an official visit to Canada and the United States during the 1989 Tiananmen Square protests and massacre. As Wan was seen as one of the representative figures of the CCP's reformist wing, leading voices within the party's top leadership, particularly retired elders, believed that Wan was sympathetic to the students and would rally behind Zhao Ziyang, the leading reformer in China's top leadership.

On May 12, Wan Li left on a scheduled working visit to Canada and the United States. On May 13, the protests entered its hunger strike stage. Some of the protesters planned a demonstration to welcome him back to Beijing in late May. Moreover, the Standing Committee of the National People's Congress, which Wan chaired, had the constitutional power to convene the National People's Congress in full session. Such an extraordinary session of the body was, legally speaking, the top authority of the state, and was seen by some scholars and political insiders as a constitutionally-sanctioned way to break the deadlock. Moreover, 57 members of the Standing Committee of the NPC had petitioned for a special convening of the body to resolve the Tiananmen crisis. On May 21, Deng met with then Shanghai party chief Jiang Zemin. In addition to hinting that Jiang was slated to "take on a bigger role" in the days ahead, Deng asked Jiang to discuss the ongoing situation with Wan Li to ensure the latter's support for the decision to crack down.

Upon returning from his visit on the afternoon of May 25, Wan's plane was diverted to Shanghai, where he was greeted by Jiang Zemin and others who tried to persuade him to take a stand against the student protests. While in Shanghai, Wan learned that his former ally Zhao Ziyang had already essentially been ousted from power, and that Deng and party elders had planned to use military force to put an end to the protests. Wan, fully aware that he did not have the military power nor personal clout necessary to fight the decision regardless of his 'true' political leanings, expressed support for the leadership on May 27, and specifically endorsed the provisions for martial law announced by conservative figures Premier Li Peng and President Yang Shangkun. Apart from asking his secretary to draft a memo clarifying his position, Wan did not make any further statements of support for the position of the leadership, suggesting that he may well have acquiesced to the decision rather than being earnestly in support of it.

== Retirement and death ==
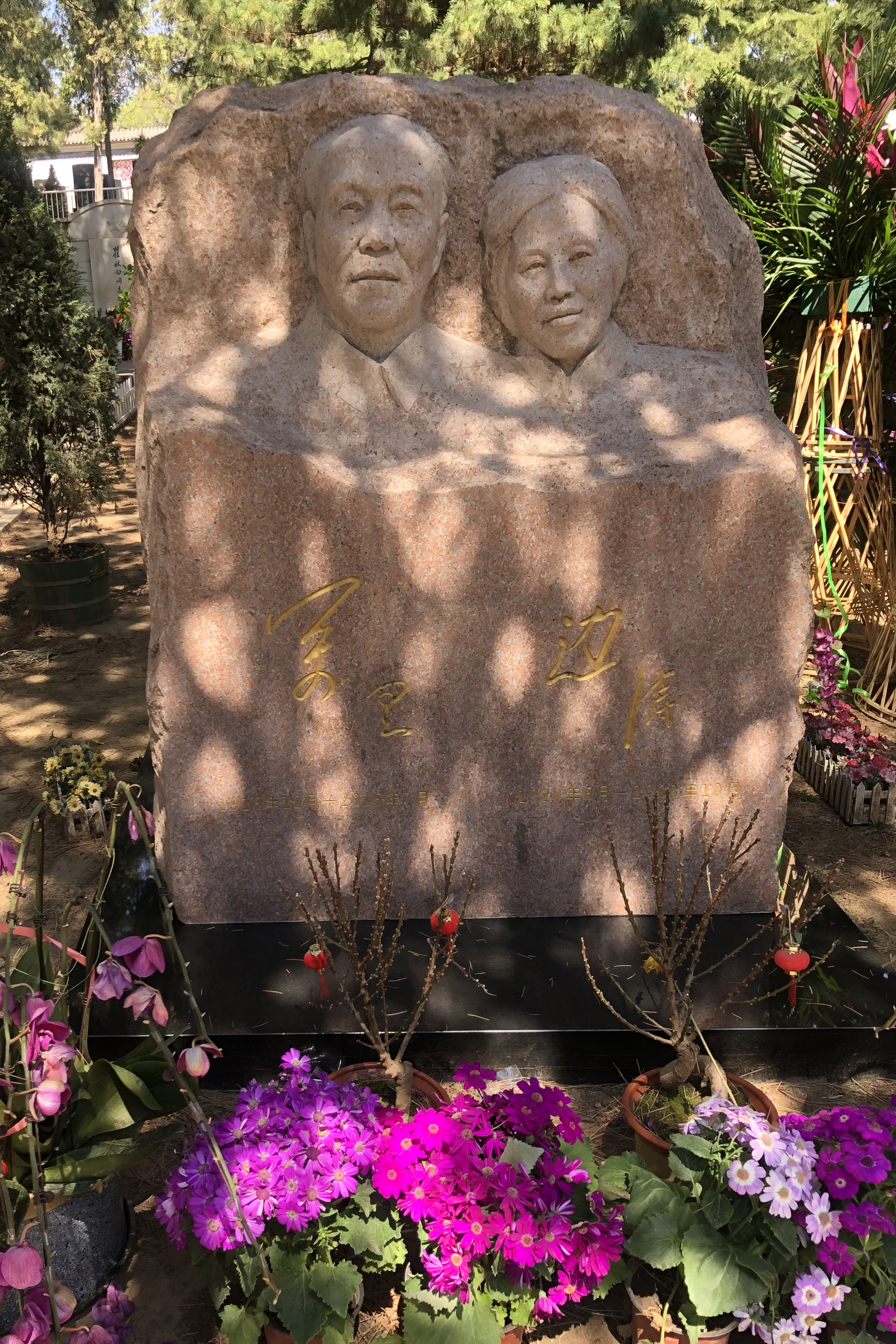
Tomb of Wan Li and his wife Bian Tao

Wan Li gradually faded from public view after 1993, making occasional appearances but otherwise heeding his own view that retired politicians should not interfere with the workings of the party and state. Bo Yibo died on January 15, 2007, leaving Wan Li as the sole living pre-revolutionary party elder. Many historians have also classified Wan Li as one of the "Eight Immortals" of the Communist Party, i.e., elders with revolutionary experience who were called upon to make the most important decisions facing the Communist Party after Deng Xiaoping became paramount leader in 1978.

Wan Li died on 15 July 2015 in Beijing of an unspecified illness. In his official obituary, Wan Li was extolled as "an excellent Party member, a time-tested fighter for the communist cause, and an outstanding proletarian revolutionary, statesman and leader of the Party and the state." It also said that Wan was "loyal to the party, loyal to the people, and loyal to the socialist cause for his entire life [...]" and that "he observed party discipline and preserved party unity".

Wan's official obituary numbered over 2,200 Chinese characters, half of the length of the obituary of second-generation stalwarts Deng Xiaoping and Chen Yun, but far higher than the word count of the obituaries of former leader Hua Guofeng, and one-time Politburo Standing Committee members Liu Huaqing, and Huang Ju, who were each given a mere few hundred words. The announcement of his death was the fifth item reported on the evening Xinwen Lianbo program; the announcement was made in the form of a "joint statement" by the top organs of the party and state, which is generally reserved for only the highest-ranked leaders.

On July 22, 2015, Wan's memorial service was held at the Babaoshan Revolutionary Cemetery. On that day, flags flown at half-mast at Tiananmen Square and at government buildings. President and Communist Party General Secretary Xi Jinping and the entire Politburo Standing Committee, except for Yu Zhengsheng, attended the memorial service. Former Chinese President Hu Jintao also attended. He died just one month before former Secretary Wei Jianxing died on August 7, 2015.

== Works ==
- "Comrade Wan Li's Discourse on Environmental Protection", China Environmental Science Press, 1988.
- "On Urban Construction by Wan Li" China Urban Press, 1994.
- Wan Li's Selected Works, published by People's Publishing House in 1995, contains 115 important articles, speeches, and talks from December 1944 to October 1994. The majority of these are works from the 1980s onwards.
- Wan Li on Rural Reform and Development, China Democracy and Legal System Publishing House, 1996.
- Wan Li on the Construction of People's Democracy and the Rule of Law, China Democracy and the Rule of Law Press, 1996.
- "On Railway Reform and Construction" by Wan Li, published by China Democracy and Legal System Publishing House in 1997.

== Notes ==
Assembly seats
Preceded by Peng Zhen	Chairman of the Standing Committee of the National People's Congress; 1988–1993	Succeeded by Qiao Shi
Government offices
Preceded by Lu Zhengcao	Minister of Railways of the People's Republic of China; 1975–1976	Succeeded by Duan Junyi
Preceded by Song Peizhang	Governor of Anhui; 1978–1979	Succeeded by Zhang Jingfu
Party political offices
Preceded by Song Peizhang	Communist Party Secretary of Anhui; 1977–1980	Succeeded by Zhang Jingfu
