= Gui Linqi =

Chinese politician (1913–1971)

Gui Linqi (Chinese: 桂林栖, July 8, 1913—August 28, 1971), a native of Guijiafan (桂家畈), Huangmei County, Hubei Province, was a Chinese politician.

== Biography ==
In 1927, Gui Linqi became a member of the Communist Youth League of China, assuming the roles of branch secretary and clandestine transit agent. In 1930, he enlisted in the Chinese Red Army and subsequently became a member of the Chinese Communist Party, serving as a publicity officer for the Red Army. In 1931, he traveled to Wuhan to participate in revolutionary endeavors. Following the commencement of the Anti-Japanese War in 1937, he was sent by Dong Biwu to return to Huangmei to initiate the anti-Japanese salvation campaign, acting as a member of the organizational committee of the Anti-Enemy Back-up Committee and establishing mass organizations including the Farmers' Resistance Association, the Women's Resistance Association, the Youth Resistance Association, and the Commercial Resistance Association, among others. In 1938, he established the Huangmei Junior Anti-Japanese Vanguard Team, the 4th Squadron of the Huangmei Anti-Japanese General Team, and the 8th Brigade of the Jiangbei Guerrillas of the New Fourth Army to combat the Japanese Army. Subsequently, he traveled to the central region of Anhui Province to engage in the development of the Wanjiang River base area, where he spearheaded the formation of the Baihu Independent Regiment (Chinese: 白湖独立团). He consecutively held the positions of secretary of the CCP Lujiang and Chaohu County Committees, and political commissar of the Baihu Independent Regiment.

Following the commencement of the Second Kuomintang-Communist Civil War in January 1948, he assumed the role of secretary of the CCP West Anhui Work Committee. In April, the West Anhui People's Self-Defense Army was established, appointing Liu Changyi (Chinese: 刘昌义) as the commander and Gui Linqi as the political commissar. In September, the WAPSA allied with the southern Second Field Army. Subsequently, he assumed the role of first deputy secretary of the CCP Wanjiang District Committee and commander-in-chief of the Tongcheng Front-support Command, overseeing front-support operations along the corridor from Mianyang to Susong. He galvanized the local populace to reconstruct and establish new military roads and bridges, facilitating the PLA's breach of the Yangtze River defense barrier and its incursion into southern China.

Following the establishment of the People's Republic of China, Gui Linqi held the position of secretary of the CCP Anqing Local Committee and political commissar of the Anqing Military Sub-district. In February 1952, he was reassigned as Minister of the Publicity Department of the CCP Anhui Provincial Committee. Subsequently, in March 1955, he became Vice-Governor of Anhui, and in July 1956, he was appointed secretary of the Secretariat of the CCP Anhui Provincial Committee. He held the positions of the first vice-chairman of the Chinese People's Political Consultative Conference of Anhui Province, and deputy secretary and executive secretary of the CCP Anhui Provincial Committee. He faced persecution during the Cultural Revolution and succumbed to illness on August 28, 1971, in Hefei.
