= Lu Rongjing =

Chinese politician

- 卢荣景

Chairman of the Anhui Provincial Committee of the Chinese People's Political Consultative Conference
- In office February 1996 – January 2000
- Preceded by: Shi Junjie
- Succeeded by: Fang Zhaoxiang

Party Secretary of Anhui
- In office April 1988 – February 1996
- Preceded by: Li Guixian
- Succeeded by: Hui Liangyu

Governor of Anhui
- In office February 1988 – April 1989
- Preceded by: Wang Yuzhao
- Succeeded by: Fu Xishou

Personal details
- Born: August 1933 (age 92) Lujiang County, Anhui, China
- Party: Chinese Communist Party

Chinese name
- Simplified Chinese: 卢荣景
- Traditional Chinese: 盧榮景
Transcriptions
Standard Mandarin
- Hanyu Pinyin: Lú Róngjǐng

Lu Rongjing (Chinese: 卢荣景; born August 1933) is a Chinese politician who served as governor of Anhui from 1988 to 1989, party secretary of Anhui from 1988 to 1996, and chairman of the Anhui Provincial Committee of the Chinese People's Political Consultative Conference from 1996 to 2000.

He was a delegate to the 7th National People's Congress. He was a member of the Standing Committee of the 9th and 10th Chinese People's Political Consultative Conference. He was a member of the 13th, 14th and 15th Central Committee of the Chinese Communist Party.

== Biography ==
Lu was born in Lujiang County, Anhui, in August 1933.

He worked in Tongguanshan Copper Mine from 1953 until 1966, when he suffered political persecution at the dawn of the Cultural Revolution. He joined the Chinese Communist Party (CCP) in December 1954. He was soon reinstated in April 1968 as head of the Revolutionary Committee of Tongguanshan Copper Mine.

He was deputy party secretary of Tongling in January 1973 before being assigned to the similar position in Ma'anshan in November 1976. He was appointed first director of Anhui Provincial Industrial Transportation Office in September 1978, concurrently serving as deputy director of Anhui Provincial Economic Commission. He was chosen as deputy head of Organization Department in January 1980 and three years later was admitted to member of the Standing Committee of the CCP Anhui Provincial Committee, the province's top authority. In December 1984, he was made deputy party secretary of Anhui. In June 1987, he was named acting governor, confirmed in February 1988. Two months later, in April, he was promoted to party chief of Anhui. It would be his first job as "first-in-charge" of a province. In February 1996, he was proposed as chairman of the Anhui Provincial Committee of the Chinese People's Political Consultative Conference, the province's top political advisory body.

Government offices
Preceded by Wang Yuzhao	Governor of Anhui; 1988–1989	Succeeded by Fu Xishou
Party political offices
Preceded by Li Guixian	Party Secretary of Anhui; 1988–1996	Succeeded by Hui Liangyu
Assembly seats
Preceded by Shi Junjie	Chairman of the Anhui Provincial Committee of the Chinese People's Political Consultative Conference; 1996–2000	Succeeded by Fang Zhaoxiang
