= Xiaojie =

Xiaojie may refer to:

- xiǎojiě, a Chinese honorific for miss
- xiǎojiě, a Mandarin Chinese profanity for prostitute

== People ==
- Wang Xiaojie (died 697), general of the Chinese dynasty Tang
- Wang Xiaojie (synchronized swimmer) (born 1971), former Chinese swimmer
- Xiao Jie (肖捷, born 1957), Chinese politician
- Xiao Jie (born 1960) (肖杰), Chinese politician
- Xiǎo Jié or Liljay (born 1986), Taiwanese singer and a member of JPM

== Transport ==
- Xiaojie station (Tianjin Metro), Tianjin, China, a metro station opened in 2025
- Xiaojie station (Kunming Metro), a metro station under construction in Kunming, Yunnan Province, China
