= Party Secretary of Qingdao =

Government position in China

Secretary of the Qingdao Municipal Committee of the Chinese Communist Party
- 中国共产党青岛市委员会书记
- Emblem of the Chinese Communist Party

- Flag of the Chinese Communist Party

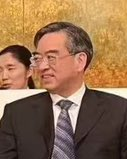
- Incumbent; Zeng Zanrong since December 2023
- Qingdao Municipal Committee of the Chinese Communist Party
- Type: Party Committee Secretary
- Status: Deputy provincial and ministerial-level official
- Member of: Qingdao Municipal Standing Committee
- Seat: Qingdao
- Nominator: Central Committee
- Appointer: Qingdao Municipal Committee; Central Committee
- Inaugural holder: Xue Shangshi
- Formation: May 1949
- Deputy: Deputy Secretary; Secretary-General

The secretary of the Qingdao Municipal Committee of the Chinese Communist Party is the leader of the Qingdao Municipal Committee of the Chinese Communist Party (CCP). As the CCP is the sole ruling party of the People's Republic of China (PRC), the secretary is the highest ranking post in Qingdao.

The secretary is officially appointed by the CCP Central Committee based on the recommendation of the CCP Organization Department, which is then approved by the Politburo and its Standing Committee. The secretary can be also appointed by a plenary meeting of the Qingdao Municipal Committee, but the candidate must be the same as the one approved by the central government. The secretary leads the Standing Committee of the Qingdao Municipal Committee. The secretary leads the work of the Municipal Committee and its Standing Committee. The secretary is outranks the mayor, who is generally the CCP deputy secretary of the committee.

The current secretary is Zeng Zanrong, who took office in December 2023.

== List of party secretaries ==
Name	Took office	Left office	Ref.
Xue Shangshi	May 1949	November 1949	
Xiang Ming	November 1949	July 1950	
Lai Keke	July 1950	December 1952	
Ren Zhibin	December 1952	December 1953	
Wang Shaoyong	December 1953	June 1955	
Li Guangwen	June 1955	June 1956	
Teng Jinglu	June 1956	November 1958	
Liu Tefu	November 1958	November 1960	
Zhang Jingtao	November 1960	Cultural Revolution	
Yi Yaocai	May 1969	July 1972	
Ma Zhongquan	July 1972	October 1973	
Liu Zhongqian	October 1973	January 1980	
Li Zhiwen	January 1980	August 1982	
Zhou Zhenxing	August 1982	July 1984	
Liu Peng	July 1984	November 1989	
Guo Songnian	November 1989	March 1992	
Yu Zhengsheng	February 1992	October 1997	
Zhang Huilai	October 1997	June 2002	
Du Shicheng	June 2002	December 2006	
Yan Qijun	December 2006	November 2010	
Li Qun	November 2010	March 2017	
Zhang Jiangting	March 2017	January 2019	
Wang Qingxian	January 2019	January 2021	
Lu Zhiyuan	August 2021	October 2023	
Zeng Zanrong	December 2023	Incumbent	
