= Anhui Academy of Social Sciences =

Research institute and think tank for philosophy and social sciences

- 安徽省社会科学院
- Abbreviation: AASS
- Formation: April 1983
- Type: Public institution
- Headquarters: Hefei, Anhui, China
- Parent organization: Anhui Provincial People's Government

The Anhui Academy of Social Sciences (Chinese: 安徽省社会科学院, abbreviated AASS) is a research institute and think tank for philosophy and social sciences in Anhui Province, China. It is a public institution managed by the Anhui Provincial People's Government.

Founded in 1983, it had 11 research institutes, seven administratives, and a library in 2000. The library has more than 100,000 books. The academy's publications include the Jianghuai Tribune (Chinese: 江淮论坛), Anhui Historical Studies (Chinese: 安徽史学), and Anhui Yearbook (Chinese: 安徽年鉴).
