= Chen Guanglin =

Chinese politician (1934–2015)

Chen Guanglin (Chinese: 陈光琳, October 1934 – September 21, 2015), originally from Chaohu, Anhui Province, was a politician in the People's Republic of China.

== Biography ==
He became a member of the Chinese Communist Party (CCP) in 1955. Subsequently, he held the positions of director of the Reform Committee of Bengbu Iron and Steel Factory (Chinese: 蚌埠钢铁厂) and director of the Bengbu Machinery Bureau. In June 1975, he was appointed to the Standing Committee of the Bengbu Municipal Committee of the CCP and served as deputy director and deputy secretary of the Reform Committee. In February 1980, he was designated as a member of the Standing Committee of the CCP Wuhu Municipal Committee, and served as deputy secretary and secretary of the CCP Wuhu Municipal Committee. In August 1988, he was designated as the secretary of the CCP Hefei Municipal Committee. In February 1992, he was designated as a member of the Standing Committee of the Anhui Provincial Committee of the CCP and as the secretary of the CCP Hefei Municipal Committee. In April 1992, he was appointed as a member of the Standing Committee of the CCP Anhui Provincial Committee and Secretary of the Provincial Commission for Discipline Inspection. He retired in May 2005. He died on September 21, 2015.

He is a delegate of National People's Congress and since the 6th and 7th NPC occurred from 1983 to 1993.
