= Du Cheng =

Chinese politician

Du Cheng (born 1937, Chinese: 杜诚), a native of Huangshan City, Anhui Province, is a Chinese politician. He served as the executive vice-chairman of the Anhui Provincial Committee of the Chinese People's Political Consultative Conference.

== Biography ==
Du Cheng graduated from the Department of Agricultural Economics at Renmin University of China in September 1965. He served as a researcher in the Investigation and Research Office of the Provincial Department of Agriculture, deputy section chief and section chief of the Publicity Department of the Wuhu Prefectural Committee of the Chinese Communist Party (CCP), deputy head of the Publicty Department of the CCP Xuancheng Committee, deputy secretary and secretary of the CCP Xuancheng Committee. In September 1993, he became the minister of the Publicity Department of Anhui Provincial Committee of the Chinese Communist Party, and later Executive Vice-chairman of the Anhui Provincial Committee of the Chinese People's Political Consultative Conference.

Du Cheng served as a delegate to the 13th and 14th National Congress of the Chinese Communist Party.
