= Liu Xingtai =

Chinese politician

- 刘星泰

Vice Chairperson of Hainan Provincial People's Congress
- In office January 2022 – May 2024
- Chairperson: Shen Xiaoming; Feng Fei

Secretary of the Political and Legal Affairs Commission of the Hainan Provincial Committee of the Chinese Communist Party
- In office August 2018 – April 2022
- Preceded by: Xiao Jie
- Succeeded by: Xu Qifang

Vice Governor of Hainan
- In office 21 January 2018 – August 2018
- Governor: Shen Xiaoming

Personal details
- Born: January 1963 (age 63) Lijin County, Shandong, China
- Party: Chinese Communist Party (1986–2024; expelled)
- Education: Shandong Machinery Industry School; CCP Shandong Provincial Party School

Chinese name
- Simplified Chinese: 刘星泰
- Traditional Chinese: 劉星泰
Transcriptions
Standard Mandarin
- Hanyu Pinyin: Liú Xīngtài

Liu Xingtai (Chinese: 刘星泰; born January 1963) is a former Chinese politician who spent most of his career in both provinces of Shandong and Hainan. As of May 2024 he was under investigation by China's top anti-graft watchdog. Previously he served as vice chairperson of Hainan Provincial People's Congress. He is the first senior official in Hainan and the 27th senior official in China to be disgraced by China's top anticorruption watchdog in 2024.

== Early life and education ==
Liu was born in Lijin County, Shandong, in January 1963. In 1980, he entered Shandong Machinery Industry School, where he majored in mechanical manufacturing. After graduation in 1983, he became a technician at Zhanhua County Agricultural Machinery Factory.

== Career ==
=== Shandong ===
Liu got involved in politics in August 1984, and joined the Chinese Communist Party (CCP) in September 1986. he had serve in Zhanhua County at every level. In 2001, he became deputy party secretary and deputy magistrate of Wudi County, rising to magistrate in January 2003. In December 2004, he was elevated to party secretary, the top political position in the county. He also served as chairperson of the People's Congress, head of the county's top legislative body.

Liu was appointed as head of the Organization Department of the CCP Zibo Municipal Committee in December 2006 and was admitted to member of the CCP Zibo Committee, the city's top authority. In February 2009, he rose to become deputy head of the Organization Department of the CCP Shandong Provincial Committee, a position at department level. In March 2013, he was appointed director of the Office of Shandong Provincial Organization Committee. He served as mayor of Rizhao from February 2015 to September 2016, and party secretary, the top political position in the city, from September 2016 to January 2018.

=== Hainan ===
Liu was chosen as vice governor of Hainan in January 2018 and six months later was admitted to member of the CCP Hainan Provincial Committee, the province's top authority. In August of the same year, he succeeded Xiao Jie as secretary of the Political and Legal Affairs Commission of the CCP Hainan Provincial Committee. In January 2022, he took office as vice chairperson of Hainan Provincial People's Congress, although he remained secretary of the Political and Legal Affairs Commission of the CCP Hainan Provincial Committee until April 2022.

== Downfall ==
On 22 May 2024, Liu was suspended for "suspected serious violations of laws and regulations" by the Central Commission for Discipline Inspection (CCDI), the party's internal disciplinary body, and the National Supervisory Commission, the highest anti-corruption agency of China. On November 8, he was stripped of his posts within the CCP and in the public office. On December 12, he was arrested on suspicion of taking bribes as per a decision made by the Supreme People's Procuratorate.

On 14 March 2025, Liu was indicted on suspicion of accepting bribes. On August 26, he was accused of abusing his powers in former positions he held between 2003 and 2024 in both Shandong and Hainan to seek benefits for relevant organizations and individuals in matters including business operations, project contracts and fund allocations, in return, he accepted money and valuables worth over 316 million yuan ($43.4 million) either directly or through others. He was sentenced to death with a two-year reprieve for bribery by Guilin Intermediate People's Court, he was deprived of political rights for life and all his properties were also confiscated.

Party political offices
Preceded by Li Xiansheng (李显升)	Director of the Office of Shandong Provincial Organization Committee; 2013–2015	Succeeded by Liu Weiyin (刘维寅)
Preceded by Yang Jun	Communist Party Secretary of Rizhao; 2016–2018	Succeeded by Qi Jiabin
Preceded by Xiao Jie	Secretary of the Political and Legal Affairs Commission of the Hainan Provincial Committee of the Chinese Communist Party; 2018–2022	Succeeded by Xu Qifang
Government offices
Preceded by Li Tongdao	Mayor of Rizhao; 2015–2016	Succeeded by Qi Jiabin
