= Hui Liangyu =

Chinese politician

- 回良玉
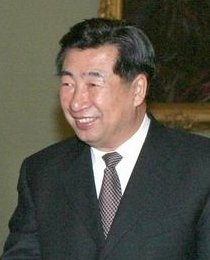
- Hui in April 2006

Vice Premier of China
- In office 17 March 2003 – 15 March 2013 Serving with Huang Ju, Wu Yi, Zeng Peiyan; Li Keqiang, Zhang Dejiang, Wang Qishan
- Premier: Wen Jiabao
- Succeeded by: Liu Yandong

Party Secretary of Jiangsu
- In office December 1999 – December 2002
- Governor: Ji Yunshi
- Preceded by: Chen Huanyou
- Succeeded by: Li Yuanchao

Party Secretary of Anhui
- In office August 1998 – December 1999
- Governor: Wang Taihua
- Preceded by: Lu Rongjing
- Succeeded by: Wang Taihua

Personal details
- Born: October 29, 1944 (age 81) Yushu, Kirin, Manchukuo
- Party: Chinese Communist Party (1969–2013)
- Relatives: See list: Kai Anastasia Hui (granddaughter)
- Education: Jilin Agricultural University

Hui Liangyu (Chinese: 回良玉; pinyin: Huí Liángyù, Xiao'erjing: ﺧُﻮِ ﻟِﯿْﺎ ﻳُﻮْْ; born October 1944) is a Chinese retired politician who served as a vice premier of China from 2003 to 2013, in charge of agriculture.

He previously served as the party secretary of Anhui from 1998 to 1999, and the party secretary of Jiangsu from 1999 to 2002.

== Biography ==
Hui was born in Yushu, Jilin in October 1944. He is a member of the Hui ethnic minority. Starting in 1969, he worked in a number of Chinese Communist Party and government positions, rising to full membership in the Politburo of the CCP Central Committee in November 2002. He was the CCP party chief in Jiangsu from 2000 to 2002. He served as a Vice Premier from 2003 to 2013.

Government offices
Preceded by Fu Xishou	Governor of Anhui; 1994–1999	Succeeded by Wang Taihua
Party political offices
Preceded by Lu Rongjing	Party Secretary of Anhui; 1998–1999	Succeeded by Wang Taihua
Preceded by Chen Huanyou	Party Secretary of Jiangsu; 1999–2002	Succeeded by Li Yuanchao
