= Wan Jifei =

Chinese politician

Wan Jifei (Chinese: 万季飞; born 1948) is a Chinese politician, and the former chairman of the China International Trade Promotion Committee and China International Chamber of Commerce. He is the fourth son of Wan Li.

== Education ==
He is a graduate of Beijing University's Politics and Administration Management Department. He holds a master's degree in law and is a senior economist for the People's Republic of China.

== Career ==
Wan Jifei began his career as deputy party secretary of Shunyi County. Later, he was transferred to the Ningxia Hui Autonomous Region. He returned to Beijing in 1995 to serve as deputy chief of the Special Economic Zone Office of the State Council. He was named deputy chairman of the China International Trade Promotion Committee in 2000.
