= Kong Changsheng =

Chinese politician

- 孔昌生

Chairman of the Henan Provincial Committee of the Chinese People's Political Consultative Conference
- Incumbent
- Assumed office January 2023
- Preceded by: Liu Wei

Specifically-designated Deputy Communist Party Secretary of Henan
- In office July 2021 – October 2021
- Party Secretary: Lou Yangsheng
- Preceded by: Yu Hongqiu
- Succeeded by: Zhou Ji

Head of the Organization Department of Henan Provincial Committee of the Chinese Communist Party
- In office February 2017 – September 2021
- Preceded by: Xia Jie
- Succeeded by: Chen Shun

Personal details
- Born: February 1963 (age 63) Jingning County, Gansu, China
- Party: Chinese Communist Party
- Education: Northwest University of Politics and Law

Kong Changsheng (Chinese: 孔昌生; pinyin: Kǒng Chāngshēng; born February 1963) is a Chinese politician, currently serving as chairman of the Henan Provincial Committee of the Chinese People's Political Consultative Conference, in office since January 2023.

Kong was a delegate to the 13th National People's Congress. He was an alternate of the 19th Central Committee of the Chinese Communist Party.

== Early life and education ==
Kong was born in Jingning County, Gansu, in February 1963. In 1985, he graduated from the Northwest University of Politics and Law, where he majored in law.

== Career ==
Kong joined the Chinese Communist Party (CCP) in January 1988. He worked in the Ministry of Personnel (later reshuffled as Ministry of Human Resources and Social Security in 2008) for a long time, and eventually became vice minister in August 2014.

Kong was appointed head of the Organization Department of the CCP Henan Provincial Committee in February 2017 and was admitted to member of the CCP Henan Provincial Committee, the province's top authority. He was deputy party secretary in July 2021 and subsequently vice chairperson of Henan Provincial People's Congress in January 2022.

In February 2023, Kong was chosen as chairman of the Henan Provincial Committee of the Chinese People's Political Consultative Conference, the provincial advisory body.

Party political offices
| Preceded by Xia Jie | Head of the Organization Department of Henan Provincial Committee of the Chinese Communist Party; 2017–2021 | Succeeded by Chen Shun |
| Preceded by Yu Hongqiu | Specifically-designated Deputy Communist Party Secretary of Henan; 2021 | Succeeded by Zhou Ji |
Incumbent
Assembly seats
| Preceded by Liu Wei | Chairman of the Henan Provincial Committee of the Chinese People's Political Consultative Conference; 2023–present | Incumbent |
