= Anhui Provincial People's Government =

Provincial-level government of Anhui, China

Anhui Provincial People's Government 安徽省人民政府
- Established: February 16, 1949; 77 years ago

Leadership
- Governor: Wang Dongwei (Acting); 23 September 2026
- Parent body: Central People's Government; Anhui Provincial People's Congress
- Elected by: Anhui Provincial People's Congress

Meeting place
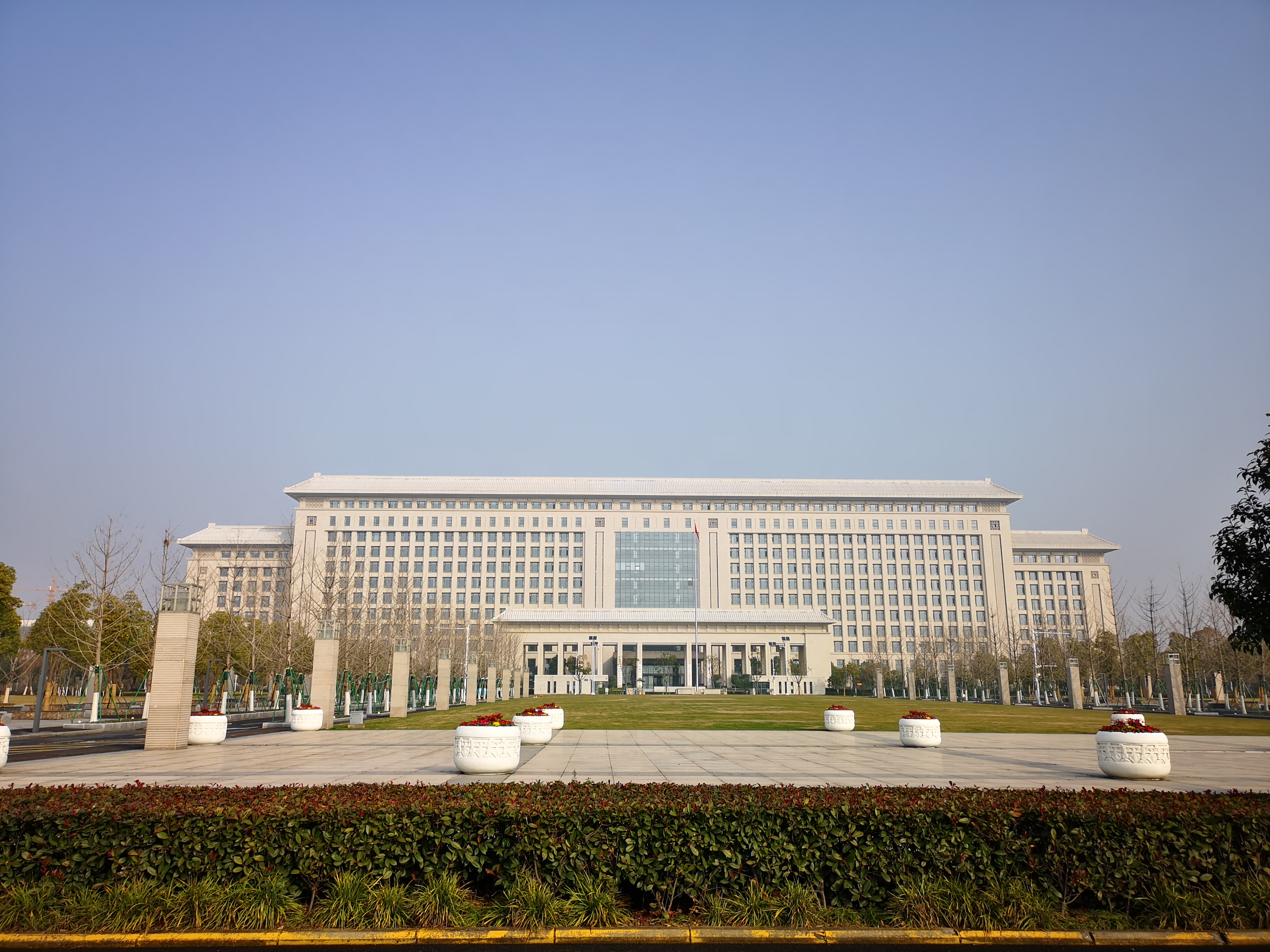
- Headquarters in Hefei, Anhui

Website
- www.ah.gov.cn

The Anhui Provincial People's Government (Chinese: 安徽省人民政府; pinyin: Ānhuīshěng Rénmín Zhèngfǔ) is the local administrative agency of Anhui. It is officially elected by the Anhui Provincial People's Congress and is formally responsible to the Anhui Provincial People's Congress and its Standing Committee. Under the country's one-party system, the governor is subordinate to the secretary of the Anhui Provincial Committee of the Chinese Communist Party. The Provincial government is headed by a governor, currently Wang Dongwei.

== History ==
On 16 February 1949, the East China Bureau of the Central Committee of the Chinese Communist Party decided to establish the Anhui Provincial Committee of the Chinese Communist Party and the Anhui Provincial People's Government. Song Renqiong was appointed as CCP committee secretary and Governor of the Provincial Government, responsible for the front-line work of the Crossing of the Yangtze River Crossing campaign. On 7 August 1952, the Central People's Government of the People's Republic of China approved the revocation of the Anhui North and Anhui South Administrative Offices and the establishment of the Anhui Provincial People's Government. Its name was changed to Anhui Provincial People's Committee (安徽省人民委员会) in March 1955 and subsequently Anhui Provincial Revolutionary Committee (安徽省革命委员会) in April 1968 during the Cultural Revolution. It reverted to its former name of Anhui Provincial People's Government in December 1979.

On April 1, 2016, the Anhui Provincial People's Government relocated from its former address at 221 Middle Changjiang Road, Hefei to 1 Zhongshan Road, Baohu District, Hefei. On May 1, 2016, the Anhui Provincial People's Government and the Anhui Provincial Committee of the Chinese Communist Party officially inaugurated their headquarters at 1 Zhongshan Road, Baohu District, Hefei.

== Organization ==
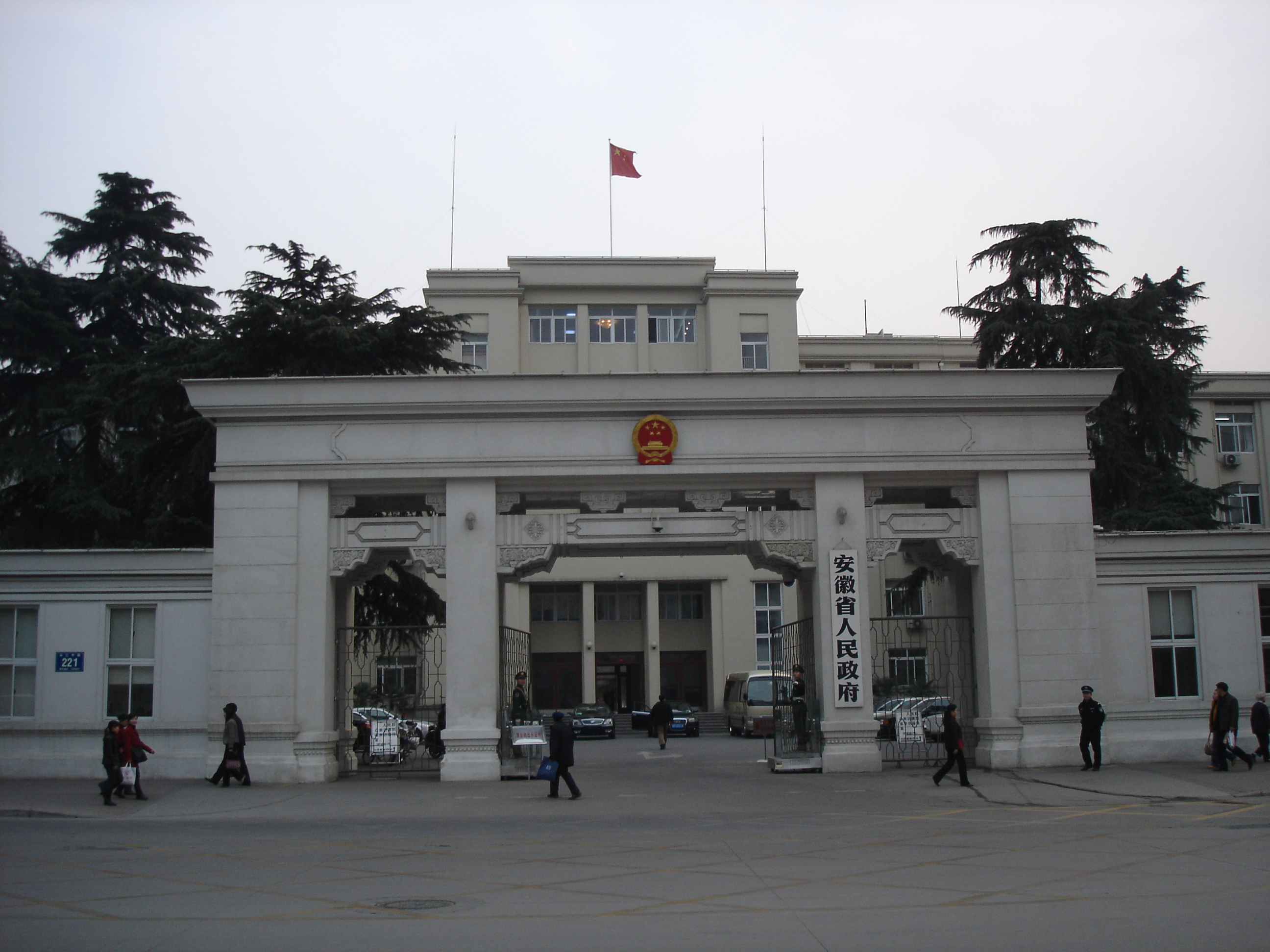
Former address of the Anhui Provincial People's Government

The organization of the Anhui Provincial People's Government includes:

- General Office of the Anhui Provincial People's Government

=== Component Departments ===
- Anhui Provincial Development and Reform Commission
- Anhui Provincial Education Department
- Anhui Provincial Science and Technology Department
- Anhui Provincial Industry and Information Technology Department
- Anhui Provincial Ethnic and Religious Affairs Commission
- Anhui Provincial Public Security Department
- Anhui Provincial Civil Affairs Department
- Anhui Provincial Justice Department
- Anhui Provincial Finance Department
- Anhui Provincial Human Resources and Social Security Department
- Anhui Provincial Natural Resources Department
- Anhui Provincial Ecology and Environment Department
- Anhui Provincial Housing and Urban Rural Development Department
- Anhui Provincial Transportation Department
- Anhui Provincial Water Resources Department
- Anhui Provincial Agriculture and Rural Affairs Department
- Anhui Provincial Commerce Department
- Anhui Provincial Culture and Tourism Department
- Anhui Provincial Health Commission
- Anhui Provincial Veterans Affairs Department
- Anhui Provincial Emergency Management Department
- Anhui Provincial Audit Office
- Foreign Affairs Office of Anhui Provincial People's Government

=== Directly affiliated special institution ===
- State-owned Assets Supervision and Administration Commission of Anhui Provincial People's Government

=== Organizations under the government ===
- Anhui Provincial Administration for Market Regulation
- Anhui Provincial Radio and Television Bureau
- Anhui Provincial Sports Bureau
- Anhui Provincial Bureau of Statistics
- Anhui Provincial Forestry Department
- Anhui Provincial Medical Security Bureau
- Anhui Provincial Office Affairs Management Bureau
- Anhui Provincial Local Financial Supervision and Administration Bureau
- Policy Research Office of Anhui Provincial People's Government
- Anhui Provincial Defense Mobilization Office
- Anhui Provincial Bureau of Letters and Visits
- Anhui Provincial Rural Revitalization Bureau
- Anhui Provincial Data Resources Management Bureau

=== Public institutions ===
- Development Research Center of Anhui Provincial People's Government
- Anhui Branch of China Council for the Promotion of International Trade
- Anhui Academy of Social Sciences
- Anhui Academy of Agricultural Sciences
- Anhui Disabled Persons' Federation
- Anhui Provincial Supply and Marketing Cooperative Federation
- Anhui Broadcasting Corporation

=== Departmental management organization ===
- Counselor's Office of Anhui Provincial People's Government
- Anhui Provincial Grain and Material Reserve Bureau
- Anhui Provincial Energy Bureau
- Anhui Provincial Prison Administration Bureau
- Anhui Provincial Drug Administration Bureau

=== Agency ===
- Management Committee of Hefei New Station Comprehensive Development Experimental Zone
- Beijing Office of the Anhui Provincial People's Government
