= Gao Hong (politician) =

Chinese politician

Gao Hong (1915-February 1983, Chinese: 高鸿), a native of Zongyang, Anhui Province, was a Chinese politician.

== Biography ==
He became a member of the Chinese Communist Party in 1940 and, following 1948, held various positions including secretary of the political department of the Jiangjiang Advance Column, deputy director and director of the Policy Research Office of the Party Committee of North Anhui District, deputy secretary-general of the CPC Anhui Provincial Committee, secretary-general of the CCP Anhui Provincial Committee, secretary-general of the CCP Anhui Province, secretary-general of the CCP Anhui Province Wuhu Committee, deputy secretary-general of the CCP Hefei Municipal Committee, deputy secretary of the CCP Xuancheng Municiapal Committee, deputy director of the Reform Committee, and vice-chairman of the Anhui Provincial Committee of CPPCC, as well as vice secretary-general of the Anhui Provincial Committee of the Chinese Communist Party. He died in February 1983 in Hefei.
