= Five Disciplines, Four Graces and Three Loves =

Chinese numbered policy

5 stresses, 4 beauties, 3 loves (simplified Chinese: 五讲四美三热爱; traditional Chinese: 五講四美三熱愛; pinyin: wǔ jiǎng sì měi sān rè ài) is a numbered policy in the People's Republic of China. On February 25, 1981, the All-China Federation of Trade Unions, the Central Committee of the Chinese Communist Youth League, the All-China Women's Federation, and nine other organizations issued a joint statement establishing this policy. Scholar Sheela Murthy has written that the policy was part of China's "civilization" (wenming) movement, an attempt to move away from the chaos of the Cultural Revolution era and maintain the legitimacy of the Chinese Communist Party. Chinese Vice-Premier Wan Li served as the chair of the 5 Stresses, 4 Beauties, 3 Loves Activity Committee.

== Content ==
- 5 stresses
  1. stress on decorum (讲文明)
  2. stress on manners (讲礼貌)
  3. stress on hygiene (讲卫生)
  4. stress on discipline (讲秩序)
  5. stress on morals (讲道德)
- 4 beauties
  1. beauty of the mind (心灵美)
  2. beauty of the language (语言美)
  3. beauty of the behavior (行为美)
  4. beauty of the environment (环境美)
- 3 loves
  1. love of the motherland (热爱祖国)
  2. love of socialism (热爱社会主义)
  3. love of the Chinese Communist Party (热爱中国共产党)
