= Xiao Jie (born 1960) =

Chinese politician (born 1960)

- 肖杰

Deputy Chairperson of the Standing Committee of the People's Congress of Hainan Province
- In office January 2021 – January 2023

Head of the United Front Work Department of the Hainan Provincial Committee of the Chinese Communist Party
- In office August 2018 – March 2021
- Preceded by: Zhang Yunsheng
- Succeeded by: Fu Caixiang

Secretary of the Political and Legal Affairs Commission of the Hainan Provincial Committee of the Chinese Communist Party
- In office April 2017 – August 2018
- Preceded by: Chen Zhirong
- Succeeded by: Liu Xingtai

Party Secretary of Sansha
- In office July 2012 – May 2017
- Preceded by: New position
- Succeeded by: Tian Xiangli

Mayor of Sansha
- In office July 2012 – May 2017
- Preceded by: New position
- Succeeded by: A Dong

Personal details
- Born: September 1960 (age 65) Leizhou, Guangdong, China
- Party: Chinese Communist Party (1984-2026, expelled)
- Education: South China University of Tropical Agriculture; Hangzhou University

Xiao Jie (Chinese: 肖杰; born September 1960) is a former Chinese politician, who was served as the deputy chairperson of the Standing Committee of the People's Congress of Hainan Province between 2021 and 2023, the head of the United Front Work Department of the Hainan Provincial Committee of the Chinese Communist Party between 2018 and 2021, and the secretary of the Political and Legal Affairs Commission of the Hainan Provincial Committee of the Chinese Communist Party between 2017 and 2018.

He was a delegate to the 19th National Congress of the Chinese Communist Party and a delegate to the 12th National People's Congress.

== Career ==
Xiao was born in Leizhou, Guangdong in September 1960. His career is almost at Hainan.

In 1974, Xiao was enrolled to South China University of Tropical Agriculture, which majored in tropical plant protection, and graduated in 1982. After graduating, he was stayed in the university, and served as an instructor of the Marxism–Leninism Teaching and Research Section. He was served as an officer of the Hainan Provincial Department of Agriculture from 1989 to 1995.

In 1995, Xiao was appointed as the deputy county head of Chengmai County. He was served as the deputy director of the Hainan Provincial Department of Agriculture in 1996, and served as the deputy secretary-general of the Hainan Provincial People's Government in 1998.

In 2000, Xiao was appointed as the party secretary of Qionghai until 2002. He was appointed as the director of the Hainan Provincial Department of Science & Technology in 2002, and he returned to the Department of Agriculture which served as the director in 2007.

In July 2012, Xiao was appointed as the party secretary of Sansha, a newly established prefecture-level city which governing three archipelago districts. He was also elected as the mayor of the city.

In April 2017, Xiao was elected as the standing member of the Hainan Provincial Committee of the Chinese Communist Party and appointed as the secretary of the Political and Legal Affairs Commission. He was appointed as the head of the United Front Work Department in August 2018. In January 2021, he was appointed as the deputy chairperson of the Standing Committee of the People's Congress of Hainan Province. He was stepped down the post in January 2023.

== Investigation ==
On 5 February 2026, Xiao was suspected of "serious violations of laws and regulations" by the Central Commission for Discipline Inspection (CCDI), the party's internal disciplinary body, and the National Supervisory Commission, the highest anti-corruption agency of China. He was expelled from the party on 25 July 2026.

Party political offices
Preceded by Zhang Yunsheng	Head of the United Front Work Department of the Hainan Provincial Committee of the Chinese Communist Party; 2018–2021	Succeeded by Fu Caixiang
Preceded by Chen Zhirong	Secretary of the Political and Legal Affairs Commission of the Hainan Provincial Committee of the Chinese Communist Party; 2017–2018	Succeeded by Liu Xingtai
New title	Party Secretary of Sansha; 2012–2017	Succeeded by Tian Xiangli
Government offices
New title	Mayor of Sansha; 2012–2017	Succeeded by A Dong
