= Xu Liuping =

Chinese politician (born 1964)

- 徐留平

First Secretary of the Secretariat of the All-China Federation of Trade Unions
- In office February 2023 – May 2026
- Preceded by: Chen Gang
- Succeeded by: Lu Zhiyuan

Chairman of FAW Group
- In office August 2017 – February 2023
- Preceded by: Xu Ping
- Succeeded by: Qiu Xiandong (邱现东)

Personal details
- Born: October 1964 (age 61) Yangzhong, Jiangsu, China
- Party: Chinese Communist Party (1987-)
- Education: Jiangsu Chemical College; Beijing Institute of Technology

Xu Liuping (Chinese: 徐留平; born October 1964) is a former Chinese politician and entrepreneur, who was served as the first secretary of the secretariat of the All-China Federation of Trade Unions from February 2023 to May 2026 and the chairman of FAW Group from August 2017 to February 2023. He was a delegate to the 13th National People's Congress.

== Career ==
Xu was born in Yangzhong, Jiangsu in October 1964. He was graduated from Jiangsu Chemical College (now Changzhou University) in 1985 and Beijing Industrial College (now Beijing Institute of Technology) in 1988. After graduating, he was enrolled to China North Industries Group Corporation and served as some positions. In 2000, he was transferred to China South Industries Group, and served as the vice president in December 2005, concurrently served as president of Changan Automobile (promoted to chairman in December 2007). He was promoted to the president of China South Industries Group in 2013.

In August 2017, Xu was appointed as the chairman of FAW Group. In February 2023, he was appointed as the party secretary of the All-China Federation of Trade Unions, and elected as the vice chairman and the first secretary of the secretariat.

== Investigation ==
On 23 May 2026, Xu was suspected of "serious violations of laws and regulations" by the Central Commission for Discipline Inspection (CCDI), the party's internal disciplinary body, and the National Supervisory Commission, the highest anti-corruption agency of China.

Civic offices
Preceded by Chen Gang	First Secretary of the Secretariat of the All-China Federation of Trade Unions; 2023－2026	Succeeded by Lu Zhiyuan
Business positions
Preceded by Xu Ping	Chairman of FAW Group; 2017－2023	Succeeded by Qiu Xiandong (邱现东)
