= Chen Jiming =

Chinese politician (born 1962)

- 陈吉明

Communist Party Secretary of Ziyang
- In office June 2018 – July 2019
- Preceded by: Zhou Xi'an
- Succeeded by: Liao Rensong

Mayor of Ziyang
- In office October 2014 – July 2018
- Preceded by: Deng Quanzhong
- Succeeded by: Wu Xu

Personal details
- Born: May 1962 (age 64) Fushun County, Sichuan, China
- Party: Chinese Communist Party (1984–2020; expelled)
- Education: Sichuan College of Finance and Economics

Chinese name
- Simplified Chinese: 陈吉明
- Traditional Chinese: 陳吉明
Transcriptions
Standard Mandarin
- Hanyu Pinyin: Chén Jímíng

Chen Jiming (Chinese: 陈吉明; born May 1962) is a former Chinese politician who spent his entire career in southwest China's Sichuan province. As of July 2019, he was under investigation by China's top anti-corruption agency. Previously he served as mayor and then Chinese Communist Party Committee Secretary of Ziyang. He was a delegate to the 13th National People's Congress.

== Biography ==
Chen was born in Fushun County, Sichuan, in May 1962. Chen's father died from an illness in his early years, and the three Chen siblings were raised by his mother. After graduating from Sichuan College of Finance and Economics in 1984, he taught at the Party School in Zigong. Chen joined the Chinese Communist Party (CCP) in April 1984.

Chen began his political career in October 1987, when he became an official in the Zigong Municipal People's Government. In November 1997, he became deputy governor of Ziliujing District, rising to governor the next year. In December 2000, he was made secretary-general of Zigong Municipal People's Government, a position he held until March 2003, while he was promoted to vice mayor of the city. In August 2008, he was promoted again to become executive vice mayor. After Deng Quanzhong had come under investigation for "serious violations of discipline and laws" in September 2014, Chen succeeded him as mayor of Ziyang, in the following month, and then CCP committee secretary, the top political position in the city, beginning in June 2018.

=== Downfall ===
On 23 July 2019, he has been placed under investigation for "serious violations of discipline and laws" by the Central Commission for Discipline Inspection (CCDI), the CCP's internal disciplinary body, and the National Supervisory Commission, the highest anti-corruption agency of China. Lei Hongjin, whom was his superior in Zigong, was also put under disciplinary and supervisory investigation in October 2019. His qualification for delegates to the 13th National People's Congress was terminated on October 26.

On 24 August 2020, he was expelled from the CCP and dismissed from public office. In September, he was indicted on suspicion of accepting bribes. On October 19, he received a sentence of ten years and six months in prison and fine of 800,000 yuan for taking bribes. According to the indictment, he used his various positions between 1998 and 2018 in Zigong and Ziyang to help others gain profits in engineering project, administrative examination and approval, job placement, enterprise financing, and in return, he illegally accepted money and goods worth about 10.84 million yuan ($1.69 million), personally or through his family members.

Government offices
Preceded by Deng Quanzhong	Mayor of Ziyang; 2014–2018	Succeeded by Wu Xu
Party political offices
Preceded by Zhou Xi'an	Communist Party Secretary of Ziyang; 2018–2019	Succeeded by Liao Rensong
