= Yunnan University of Finance and Economics =

University in Kunming, China

- 云南财经大学
- Other names: 云财大, Yúncáidà
- Former names: Yunnan Institute of Finance and Trade (1958-1999), Yunnan Financial Cadres Training School (1951-58)
- Motto: 求实创新
- Motto in English: Innovation
- Type: Key Provincial University
- Established: December 1951; 75 years ago
- President: Shuxin Xiong (熊术新)
- Faculty: 2,144
- Students: 34,000
- Location: Kunming, China
- Campus: Urban, 68 ha (170 acres)
- Website: www.ynufe.edu.cn

The Yunnan University of Finance and Economics (YUFE; Chinese: 云南财经大学) is a provincial-level university in Kunming, Yunnan province, China focusing on fields related to commerce and management.

== History ==
YUFE was established as the Yunnan Financial Cadres Training School in early 1951. Its goal was to train Communist Party officials in basic financial and accounting management skills. In 1958 the school was combined with four other training institutions to become the Yunnan Institute of Finance and Trade (YIFT). During the Cultural Revolution the school was shuttered for seven years, not fully resuming operation until 1978. The following year the provincial government announced a plan to transform YIFT into a full-fledged institution of higher education, extending its offerings to four-year bachelor's degrees.

In 1998, the People's Government of Yunnan Province announced a plan to merge the Yunnan Economic Management Cadres College with the Yunnan Institute of Finance and Trade. In 1999 the institution was awarded full university status, and renamed the Yunnan University of Finance and Economics.

== Present Day ==
It is a comprehensive university with programmes in economics, management, law, philosophy, liberal arts, natural science and engineering education. The university is accredited to offer bachelor's degrees, Master's degrees and Doctoral degrees.

The university has a total of 17 teaching departments, including the School of Finance, School of Business Administration, and the International Business School. It has a total 28 undergraduate specialties. This also consist of eight provincial key disciplines and four provincial key subjects.

YUFE has four first class disciplines in theoretical economics, applied economics, management, science, engineering and business administration. YUFE also has 40 other second-class disciplines for which the university can confer master's degrees.

The university has over 34,000 full-time students (undergraduate and graduate). The total number of students is approximately 24,000, including part-time students, foreign students and mature age students.

The faculty of YUFE comprises over 2,144 faculty members including 1,400 full-time lecturers. Among them, there are more than 300 professors or associate professors and 70 Doctors. YUFE also hired 10-20 foreign expert teachers who teach English language classes and business classes in English.

== Rankings ==
As of 2024, Yunnan University of Finance and Economics ranked # 4 in Southwestern China region and # 29 nationwide among universities specialized in finance, business, and economics in the Best Chinese Universities Ranking.

== Campus ==
YUFE's main campus in Kunming covers 1021 mu (68 hectares) with about 634,000 square meters of floor space. The Kunming campus library has a collection of 1.4 million items. In 2019 the university founded a branch campus of 1257 mu (84 hectares) in the nearby city of Anning.
