= Wang Qingxian =

Chinese politician

- 王清宪

Governor of Anhui
- In office 1 February 2021 – 23 September 2026
- Party Secretary: Li Jinbin; Zheng Shanjie; Han Jun; Liang Yanshun
- Preceded by: Li Guoying
- Succeeded by: Wang Dongwei (acting)

Party Secretary of Qingdao
- In office 29 January 2019 – 29 January 2021
- Preceded by: Zhang Jiangting
- Succeeded by: Lu Zhiyuan

Personal details
- Born: July 1963 (age 63) Yongnian County, Hebei, China
- Party: Chinese Communist Party
- Education: Nankai University; Graduate School of Chinese Academy of Social Sciences

Chinese name
- Traditional Chinese: 王清憲
- Simplified Chinese: 王清宪
Transcriptions
Standard Mandarin
- Hanyu Pinyin: Wáng Qīngxiàn

Wang Qingxian (Chinese: 王清宪; born July 1963) is a Chinese politician who served as the Governor of Anhui from 2021 to 2026. He entered the workforce in July 1983, and joined the Chinese Communist Party in August 1986.

He was a delegate to the 12th National People's Congress. He is a delegate to the 13th National People's Congress.

== Early life and education ==
Wang was born in Yongnian County, Hebei, in July 1963. After the resumption of college entrance examination, he was admitted to Nankai University in September 1979, where he majored in philosophy. After graduating in July 1983, he was dispatched to Heilongjiang Daily as an assistant reporter. In September 1987, he entered the Graduate School of Chinese Academy of Social Sciences, where he obtained a Master of Laws degree. In July 1990, he joined the People's Daily Economic Department as an editor and senior reporter. He served as deputy editor in chief in May 1996, and three years later promoted to the editor in chief position. During this period, he earned his doctor's degree in economic from the Graduate School of Chinese Academy of Social Sciences in July 2003.

== Political career ==
Wang entered politics in September 2004 in north China's Shanxi province. He successively served as deputy secretary general of Shanxi government, director of the Research Office of Shanxi government, executive deputy head of the Publicity Department of the CPC Shanxi Provincial Committee, and party branch secretary of the General Office of Shanxi government. In January 2011, he was named acting mayor of Jincheng, replacing Xue Rongzhe. He was installed as mayor in April of the same year. In February 2013, he was named acting mayor of Yuncheng, concurrently holding the Deputy Party Secretary position. In May 2016, he was appointed Party Secretary of Lüliang, but having held the position for only six months. In November 2016, he was transferred to Taiyuan, capital of Shanxi, where he was appointed deputy head of the Publicity Department of the CPC Shanxi Provincial Committee. He was admitted to member of the standing committee of the CPC Shanxi Provincial Committee, the province's top authority.

In November 2017, he was assigned to the similar position in the neighboring Shandong province. He briefly served as secretary general of the CPC Shandong Provincial Committee. In January 2019, he was transferred to the coastal city Qingdao and appointed Party Secretary.

In January 2021, he was appointed Deputy Party Secretary of Anhui and party branch secretary of the provincial government. On February 1, he was elected governor on the 4th session of the 13th Anhui People's Congress. His predecessor Li Guoying was transferred to Beijing, capital of China, and appointed minister of Water Resources.

On 23 September 2026, he stopped serving as Deputy Secretary of the Anhui Party Provincial Committee and the Governor of Anhui. On 6 November 2026, he was appointed as the vice chairman of the National People's Congress Social Development Affairs Committee at the 25th meeting of the Standing Committee of the 14th National People's Congress.

Government offices
Preceded by Xue Rongzhe	Mayor of Jincheng; 2011–2013	Succeeded by Liu Runmin
Preceded by Wang Anpang	Mayor of Yuncheng; 2013–2016	Succeeded by Chen Zhenliang
Preceded by Li Guoying	Governor of Anhui; 2021–2026	Succeeded by Wang Dongwei
Party political offices
Preceded by Gao Weidong	Party Secretary of Lüliang; 2016–2016	Succeeded by Li Zhengyin
Preceded by Hu Suping	Head of the Publicity Department of the CPC Shanxi Provincial Committee; 2016–2017	Succeeded by Lian Yimin
Preceded by Sun Shougang	Head of the Publicity Department of the CPC Shandong Provincial Committee; 2017–2018	Succeeded by Guan Zhihong
Preceded by Hu Wenrong	Secretary General of the CPC Shandong Provincial Committee; 2018–2019	Succeeded by Sun Licheng
Preceded by Zhang Jiangting	Party Secretary of Qingdao; 2019–2021	Succeeded by Lu Zhiyuan
