= Qingdao Municipal Committee of the Chinese Communist Party =

Qingdao Municipal Committee of the Chinese Communist Party 中国共产党青岛市委员会

Overview
- Type: Highest decision-making organ when Qingdao Municipal Congress is not in session.
- Elected by: Qingdao Municipal Congress
- Length of term: Five years
- Term limits: None
- Secretary: Zeng Zanrong
- Executive organ: Standing Committee
- Inspection organ: Commission for Discipline Inspection

The Qingdao Municipal Committee of the Chinese Communist Party is the local branch of the Chinese Communist Party (CCP) in Qingdao, Shandong Province. It is elected by the Qingdao Congress of the CCP. The Constitution of the Chinese Communist Party stipulates that the Qingdao Municipal Committee executes the directives of the CCP Central Committee and the Shandong Provincial Committee of the Chinese Communist Party, as well as the resolutions of the Municipal Party Congress during its recess, oversees the administration of Nanjing, and provides regular reports on its activities to the Central Committee and the Qingdao Provincial Committee.

== History ==
On 2 June 1949, after the People's Liberation Army entered Qingdao, the Qingdao Municipal Committee of the Chinese Communist Party set up three departments: Secretariat, Organization Department, and Propaganda Department. Subsequently, seven departments were added, including the General Office, United Front Work Department, Discipline Inspection Commission, and Industry Department. After 1953, seven departments corresponding to government administrative agencies, namely Culture and Education, Finance and Trade, Politics and Law, Production Cooperation, State-owned Industry, Local Industry, and Transportation, as well as the Research Office, were added.

In June 1956, the Qingdao Municipal Committee of the Chinese Communist Party had 14 working departments. Starting in 1958, in accordance with the CCP Central Committee and the Shandong Provincial Committee of the CCP’s decision to streamline the organization, the State-owned Industry Department, the Local Industry Department, and the Transportation Department were merged into the Industry and Transportation Department, and the Culture and Education Department was merged into the Propaganda Department. In November 1963, the working departments of the Qingdao Municipal Committee of the CCP were reduced to 11 departments, including the General Office, the Research Office, the Organization Department, the Propaganda Department, the United Front Work Department, the Supervisory Commission, the Party School, the Finance and Trade Department, the Industry and Transportation Department, the Political and Legal Affairs Leading Group, and the Rural Work Office.

In the early stages of the Cultural Revolution, the working bodies of the Qingdao Municipal Committee of the Chinese Communist Party (CCP) ceased operations. After the establishment of the Qingdao Municipal Revolutionary Committee, it replaced some of the functions of the former CCP Qingdao Municipal Committee working bodies. On August 16, 1969, the core leadership group of the CCP Qingdao Municipal Revolutionary Committee was established. In September 1975, the Fourth CCP Qingdao Municipal Committee was elected, and the working bodies of the CCP Qingdao Municipal Committee were restored, comprising four departments: the General Office, the Organization Department, the Propaganda Department, and the United Front Work Department.

By 1980, the Qingdao Municipal Committee of the Chinese Communist Party had nine working departments, including the General Office, the Organization Department, the Propaganda Department, the United Front Work Department, the Research Office, the Discipline Inspection Commission, the Party School, the Agricultural Commission, and the Political and Legal Leading Group. After the institutional reform in 1983, six more departments were added, including the Enterprise Political Work Department, the Bureau of Veteran Cadres, the Office of the Guiding Committee for Spiritual Civilization, the Office of the Leading Group for Combating Serious Economic Crimes, the Office for Taiwan Affairs, and the Office of the Committee for the Collection of Party History Materials. In July 1983, the Discipline Inspection Commission of the Qingdao Municipal Committee of the Chinese Communist Party was upgraded and was no longer included in the Qingdao Municipal Committee of the Chinese Communist Party.
