= Huang Yaonan =

Chinese politician (1905–1977)

Huang Yaonan (1905–1977, Chinese: 黄耀南), a native of Jiayi Town, Pingjiang County, Hunan Province, was a Chinese politician.

== Biography ==
=== First Nationalist-Communist Civil War ===
In 1925, Huang Yaonan enrolled as a student at Pingjiang Normal School. He participated in the campaign to prohibit British kerosene in Pingjiang County and the agrarian revolution in Pingjiang. In August 1927, he became a member of the Chinese Communist Party (CCP). In September 1927, he participated in the Autumn Harvest Uprising. In 1928, he participated in the Pingjiang riot. He held the positions of organization minister for the CCP Pingjiang Northwest Work Committee, publicity minister for the Pingjiang County Committee, and secretary-general of the Xiang-E-Gan Provincial Military Region. Subsequent to 1934, he participated in the 16th Red Army during the guerrilla warfare along the Xiang-E-Gan border. Subsequent to the second national-communist collaboration, he represented the Red Army of Xiang-E-Gan in negotiations. At the conclusion of 1937, the Red Army guerrillas along the Xiang-E-Gan frontier were restructured into the inaugural regiment of the first detachment of the New Fourth Army. He remained as the director of the Pingjiang Reservation Office of the New Fourth Army (located in Jiayi Township) and served as the minister of publicity and united front activities for the CCP Xiang-E-Gan Special Committee. On June 12, 1939, Pingjiang massacre occurred, resulting in the immediate death of Tu Zhenkun, the secretary of the Special Committee of Xiang-Egan, while Huang Yaonan relocated to the hilly region of Hengjiang to manage the aftermath.

In mid-July 1939, he communicated the particulars of the Pingjiang massacre to the Jiangxi Provincial Committee of the Chinese Communist Party, and at the onset of August 1939, he relayed and organized the formation of the new Xiang-E-Gan Special Committee in Dongkeng, Pingjiang. He subsequently assumed the position as head of the Organization Department of the CCP Jiangxi Provincial Committee. In October 1940, the Southeast Branch of the CCP Central Committee resolved to establish the clandestine Anhui Special Committee. Following the withdrawal of the New Fourth Army's military headquarters, Huang Yaonan remained in southern Anhui to continue the struggle and served as the secretary of the newly formed Special Committee. In April 1941, following the establishment of the Seventh Division of the New Fourth Army, the offices of the Anhui Special Committee were relocated to Baijaozhou (Chinese: 白茆洲) in Wuwei, situated north of the Yangtze River. Li Buxin served as the secretary, while Huang Yaonan held the positions of deputy secretary and political commissar of the 57th Regiment of the Seventh Division of the New Fourth Army.

=== Second Nationalist-Communist Civil War ===
In the Second Nationalist-Communist Civil War, Huang Yaonan held multiple roles, including Political Commissar of the 20th Brigade of the 7th Column of the East China Field Army, deputy director of the Political Department of the 7th Column, deputy director of the Work Department of the East China Bureau of the CCP in the Nationalist Region, and Secretary of the Work Committee of the Wanjiang River, among others.

=== People's Republic of China ===
Following 1949, he held positions as the Personnel Director and Secretary of the Party Committee for the East China Military Commission, Personnel Director of the East China Military Commission, Deputy Minister of Personnel, Deputy Secretary General of the Shanghai Municipal Committee, Procurator at the Anhui Provincial People's Procuratorate, member of the CCP Anhui Provincial Standing Committee, and Secretary of the Political and Legal Committee. From May 5 to 11, 1960, the second session of the National People's Congress of Anhui Province convened, attended by Huang Yaonan and other vice-governors of Anhui Province. From May 5 to May 12, 1960, the second session of the Chinese People's Political Consultative Conference of Anhui Province convened, during which Huang Yaonan and Lv Jifang were co-opted as provincial vice chairmen of the Chinese People's Political Consultative Conference; Huang Yaonan succeeded Zhang Kaifan as the head of the Anhui Provincial Party Committee's Foreign Affairs Working Group. On August 8, 1961, Huang Yaonan held the position of secretary of the CCP Anhui Provincial Committee Secretariat. In March 1963, He was appointed as deputy chief of the supervisory group at the Central Supervisory Commission at the East China Bureau.

He died in February 1977 under persecution during the Cultural Revolution.
