= Wang Qimin =

Wang Qimin may refer to:

- Wang Qimin (petroleum engineer), a Chinese petroleum engineer
- Wang Qimin (cinematographer), a Chinese cinematographer
