= Zheng Hong =

Chinese politician

- 郑洪

Vice Chairman of Chongqing Municipal People's Congress
- In office January 2008 – January 2018
- Chairman: Zhang Xuan

Personal details
- Born: May 1955 (age 71) Jiangjin District, Chongqing, China
- Party: Chinese Communist Party (1975–2023; expelled)
- Education: Central Party School of the Chinese Communist Party

Chinese name
- Simplified Chinese: 郑洪
- Traditional Chinese: 鄭洪
Transcriptions
Standard Mandarin
- Hanyu Pinyin: Zhèng Hóng

Zheng Hong (Chinese: 郑洪; born May 1955) is a retired Chinese politician who served as vice chairman of Chongqing Municipal People's Congress from 2008 to 2018. He was investigated by China's top anti-graft agency in March 2023.

== Early life and education ==
Zheng was born in Jiangjin District, Chongqing, in May 1955. He joined the Chinese Communist Party (CCP) in December 1975.

== Career ==
Zheng got involved in politics in May 1976, when he was appointed deputy party secretary of Wutan District. He successively served as deputy party secretary and party secretary of Xianlong Township, deputy party secretary and party secretary of Shimen District, and secretary of Jiangjin County Party Committee of the Communist Youth League of China. He was vice magistrate of Jiangjin County in March 1986 and subsequently deputy party secretary in March 1987. He became party secretary of Dazu County (now Dazu District) in August 1993, before being assigned to a similar position in Hechuan in December 1997. He became governor of Jiulongpo District in February 2001, and then party secretary, the top political position in the district, beginning in December of that same year. In January 2008, he was promoted to become vice chairman of Chongqing Municipal People's Congress, a position he held for ten years. He also served as chairman of Chongqing Municipal Federation of Trade Unions from November 2012 to April 2018.

== Downfall ==
On 16 March 2023, Zheng has been placed under investigation for "serious violations of laws and regulations" by the Central Commission for Discipline Inspection (CCDI), the party's internal disciplinary body, and the National Supervisory Commission, the highest anti-corruption agency of China. On August 30, he was expelled from the CCP. On September 28, he was detained by the Supreme People's Procuratorate.

On 25 January 2024, Zheng was indicted on charges of bribery and abuse of power. On October 11, he stood trial at the Intermediate People's Court of Xi'an on charges of taking bribes, he allegedly took advantage of his positions in Chongqing to seek benefits for others in enterprise operation and project contracting between 1998 and 2023, he was charged with accepting money and property worth over 33.14 million yuan ($4.6 million) either himself or via his family members.

On 17 March 2025, Zheng was sentenced to 15 years and fined 5 million yuan for taking bribes, all property gained from the bribery would be turned over to the national treasury.

Party political offices
Preceded by Wang Qingyu	Communist Party Secretary of Dazu County; 1993–1997	Succeeded by Lü Mingliang
Preceded by ?	Communist Party Secretary of Jiulongpo District; 2001–2008	Succeeded by Liu Guangquan
Government offices
Preceded by ?	Governor of Jiulongpo District; 2001	Succeeded by Qin Min
Preceded by ?	chairman of Chongqing Municipal Federation of Trade Unions; 2012–2018	Succeeded by Xia Zuxiang
