= Fu Xishou =

Chinese business executive and politician

- 傅锡寿

Governor of Anhui
- In office April 1989 – December 1994
- Party Secretary: Lu Rongjing
- Preceded by: Lu Rongjing
- Succeeded by: Hui Liangyu

Personal details
- Born: January 1931 Beijing, China
- Died: 25 March 2015 (aged 84) Hefei, Anhui, China
- Party: Chinese Communist Party
- Education: Tsinghua University

Chinese name
- Simplified Chinese: 傅锡寿
- Traditional Chinese: 傅錫壽
Transcriptions
Standard Mandarin
- Hanyu Pinyin: Fù Xīshòu

Fu Xishou (Chinese: 傅锡寿; January 1931 – 25 March 2015) was a Chinese business executive and politician who served as governor of Anhui from 1989 to 1994.

He was an alternate member of the 13th Central Committee of the Chinese Communist Party and a member of the 14th Central Committee of the Chinese Communist Party. He was a delegate to the 8th National People's Congress. He was a member of the Standing Committee of the 8th Chinese People's Political Consultative Conference and 9th Chinese People's Political Consultative Conference.

== Biography ==
Fu was born in Beijing, in January 1931.

After graduating from Tsinghua University in 1953, he was assigned to Anshan Iron and Steel Ferrous Metallurgy Design Company (later renamed Anshan Ferrous Metallurgy Design Institute of the Ministry of Metallurgical Industry).

Beginning in September 1958, he served in several posts in the Chongqing Ferrous Metallurgy Design Institute, including technician, engineer, deputy section chief of professional section, and chief engineer. He joined the Chinese Communist Party (CCP) in August 1959.

Starting in May 1966, he successively served as chief design director of chief engineer's office, production team engineer of the reform committee, chief design director of Panzhihua Iron and Steel Base, and deputy leader and then team leader of Panzhihua Iron and Steel Base of the Chongqing Iron & Steel Design Institute. He rose to become deputy chief engineer and vice president in May 1978.

In August 1982, he was promoted to become president and party secretary of the Ma'anshan Iron and Steel Design and Research Institute, and served until June 1987. He also served as deputy party secretary of Ma'anshan from February 1985 to June 1987.

In April 1989, he became governor of Anhui, a post he kept until December 1994. He concurrently served as deputy party secretary from June 1987 to January 1995. He retired in March 2004.

On 25 March 2015, he died from an illness in Hefei, Anhui, at the age of 84.

Government offices
| Preceded by Lu Rongjing | Governor of Anhui; 1989–1994 | Succeeded by Hui Liangyu |
