= Fang Zhaoxiang =

Chinese politician

Fang Zhaoxiang (born 8 March 1942, Chinese: 方兆祥), a native of Anqing, Anhui Province, is a Chinese politician.

== Biography ==
Fang Zhaoxiang obtained a degree in plant protection from Anhui Agricultural College, inside the Department of Agronomy. In March 1966, he assumed a teaching position at Anhui Agricultural College. He became a member of the Chinese Communist Party in December 1971. In September 1983, he assumed the position of deputy secretary of the CCP Anqing Municipal Committee. In January 1988, he assumed the position of secretary of the CCP Anqing Municipal Committee. In December 1991, he assumed the role of Secretary General of the CCP Anqing Municipal Committee. In January 1992, he was appointed as a member of the Standing Committee of the CCP Anhui Provincial Committee and served as the secretary-general of the provincial party committee. In September 1993, he assumed the role of deputy secretary of the CCP Anhui Provincial Committee. In September 1993, he was appointed Deputy Secretary of the CCP Anhui Provincial Committee; in January 2001, he assumed the role of Chairman of the Anhui Provincial Committee of the Chinese People's Political Consultative Conference.

In October 2006, he was appointed deputy director of the Committee of Education, Science, Culture, Health and Sports of the 10th National Committee of the Chinese People's Political Consultative Conference (CPPCC), and in March 2008, he was re-elected as deputy director of the Committee of Education, Science, Culture, Health and Sports of the 11th National Committee of the CPPCC.

He is delegate to the 14th and 16th CCP National Congress, delegate to the 9th National People's Congress, Member of the 9th, 10th, and 11th National Committee of the Chinese People's Political Consultative Conference.
