= Lu Zhiyuan =

Chinese politician

- 陆治原
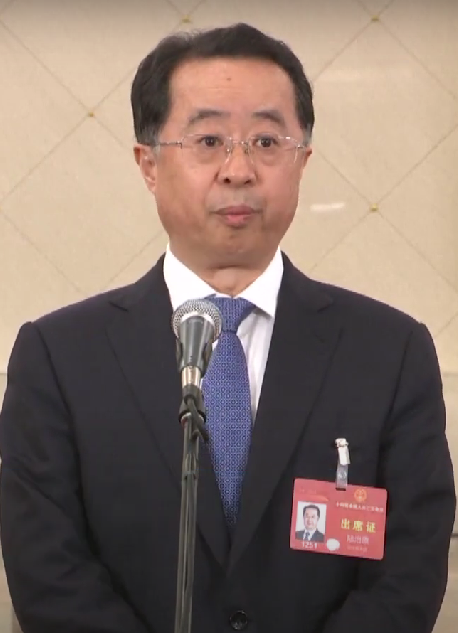
- Lu in 2024

First Secretary of the Secretariat of the All-China Federation of Trade Unions
- Incumbent
- Assumed office 28 July 2026
- Preceded by: Xu Liuping

Minister of Civil Affairs
- In office December 29, 2023 – August 28, 2026
- Premier: Li Qiang
- Deputy: Hu Haifeng; Tang Chengpei; Zhang Chunsheng; Li Baojun
- Preceded by: Tang Dengjie
- Succeeded by: Li Changguan

Specifically-designated Deputy Communist Party Secretary of Shandong
- In office June 2022 – November 2023
- Party Secretary: Li Ganjie; Lin Wu
- Preceded by: Yang Dongqi
- Succeeded by: Wang Yuyan

Party Secretary of Qingdao
- In office 2 September 2021 – 4 November 2023
- Preceded by: Wang Qingxian
- Succeeded by: Zeng Zanrong

Director of the Liaoning Organization Department
- In office 4 September 2018 – 1 September 2021
- Preceded by: Wang Zhengpu
- Succeeded by: Xiong Maoping

Personal details
- Born: August 1964 (age 62) Suide County, Shaanxi, China
- Party: Chinese Communist Party (1987-)
- Education: Xi'an Jiaotong University

Chinese name
- Simplified Chinese: 陆治原
- Traditional Chinese: 陸治原
Transcriptions
Standard Mandarin
- Hanyu Pinyin: Lù Zhìyuán

Lu Zhiyuan (Chinese: 陆治原; born August 1964) is a Chinese politician, currently serving as the first secretary of the secretariat and the deputy president of the All-China Federation of Trade Unions and the minister of Civil Affairs. He previously served as the party secretary of Qingdao and deputy party secretary of Shandong.

He was a representative of the 20th National Congress of the Chinese Communist Party. He was a delegate to the 12th National People's Congress. He is a representative of the 20th National Congress of the Chinese Communist Party and a member of the 20th Central Committee of the Chinese Communist Party.

== Biography ==
Lu was born in Suide County, Shaanxi, in August 1964. In 1984, he entered Shaanxi College of Finance and Economics (now Xi'an Jiaotong University), where he majored in public finance. After graduating in 1988, he taught at Yan'an School of Finance and Economics.

In July 1993, Lu was assigned to Xi'an Municipal Finance Bureau, where he eventually becoming deputy director in November 2000. Lu became governor of Yanliang District, a district under the jurisdiction of Xi'an, in July 2002, and then party secretary, the top political position in the district, beginning in November 2005. In August 2008, he was appointed party secretary of Baqiao District, a position he held until June 2010. In August 2011, he was named acting mayor of Yulin, confirmed in January 2012. He was party secretary of Weinan in June 2015, in addition to serving as chairman of its People's Congress. He rose to become vice governor of Shaanxi in January 2018.

In September 2018, Lu was transferred to the coastal Liaoning province, where he was appointed head of the Organization Department of the CCP Liaoning Provincial Committee and was admitted to member of the Standing Committee of the CCP Liaoning Provincial Committee, the province's top authority.

In September 2021, Lu was transferred to east China's Shandong province. He was made party secretary of Qingdao and was admitted to member of the Standing Committee of the CCP Shandong Provincial Committee, the province's top authority. In June 2022, he was elevated to deputy party secretary of Shandong. He was appointed as the minister of Civil Affairs on 29 December 2023, succeeding Tang Dengjie.

On 30 June 2026, Lu was appointed as the party secretary of the All-China Federation of Trade Unions. He was elected as the first secretary of the secretariat and the deputy president of the ACFTU on 28 July. In August 2026, the Standing Committee of the National People's Congress formally removed Lu Zhiyuan from his position as Minister of Civil Affairs and appointed Li Changguan as new minister.

Government offices
Preceded by Hu Zhiqiang	Mayor of Yulin; 2011–2015	Succeeded by Yu Jundong (尉俊东)
Preceded by Tang Dengjie	Minister of Civil Affairs; 2023–2026	Succeeded by Li Changguan
Party political offices
Preceded by Xu Xinrong	Communist Party Secretary of Weinan; 2015–2018	Succeeded by Li Mingyuan
Preceded by Wang Zhengpu	Head of the Organization Department of Liaoning Provincial Committee of the Chinese Communist Party; 2018–2021	Succeeded by Xiong Maoping
Preceded by Wang Qingxian	Communist Party Secretary of Qingdao; 2021–2023	Succeeded by Zeng Zanrong
Preceded by Yang Dongqi	Specifically-designated Deputy Communist Party Secretary of Shandong; 2022–2023	Succeeded by Wang Yuyan
Civic offices
Preceded by Xu Liuping	First Secretary of the Secretariat of the All-China Federation of Trade Unions; 2026－	Incumbent
