= Wang Dongwei =

Chinese politician

- 王东伟
- Wang in 2024

Governor of Anhui
- Acting
- Assumed office 23 September 2026
- Party Secretary: Li Lecheng
- Preceded by: Wang Qingxian

Standing Deputy Governor of Anhui
- In office 31 October 2025 – 23 September 2026
- Governor: Wang Qingxian
- Preceded by: Fei Gaoyun
- Succeeded by: Yu Shengbin

Personal details
- Born: September 1969 (age 57) Tanghe County, Henan, China
- Party: Chinese Communist Party (1988-)
- Education: Shanghai University of Finance and Economics; Dongbei University of Finance and Economics

Wang Dongwei (Chinese: 王东伟; born September 1969) is a Chinese politician, currently serving as the deputy secretary of the Anhui Provincial Committee of the Chinese Communist Party and the governor of Anhui since September 2026. Previously he was served as the standing deputy governor of Anhui and the deputy minister of finance. He is a delegate to the 20th National Congress of the Chinese Communist Party.

== Career ==
Wang was born in Tanghe County, Henan in September 1969. He was enrolled to the economy department of Shanghai University of Finance and Economics in 1988 and graduated in 1992. After graduation, he was enrolled to the Ministry of Finance, which worked in the department of personnel and education, the department of basic construction, the department of economic construction, the department of treasury. In 2010, he was temporary served as the deputy mayor of Ganzhou in Jiangxi, and served as the standing member of the CCP Ganzhou committee in 2011.

In 2013, Wang was appointed as the deputy director of the department of administrative, political and legal Affairs of the finance ministry.

In 2017, Wang was appointed as the director of the Henan Provincial Finance Department. In July 2021, he was appointed as the party secretary of Xinyang, and appointed as the standing member of the Henan Provincial Committee of the Chinese Communist Party. He was appointed as the head of the united front work department of the CCP Henan Provincial Committee and the deputy party secretary of the Henan Provincial Committee of the Chinese People's Political Consultative Conference in November 2021.

In July 2022, Wang was returned to the finance ministry, and appointed as the deputy minister.

In October 2025, Wang was appointed as the standing member of the Anhui Provincial Committee of the Chinese Communist Party, and the standing deputy governor of Anhui.

In September 2026, Wang was appointed as the deputy secretary of the CCP Anhui Provincial Committee and the acting governor of Anhui.

Government offices
Preceded by Fei Gaoyun	Standing Deputy Governor of Anhui; 2025–2026	Succeeded by Yu Shengbin
Preceded by Wang Qingxian	Governor of Anhui; 2026–	Incumbent
