= Zhang Yunsheng =

Chinese politician

Zhang Yunsheng (simplified Chinese: 张韵声; traditional Chinese: 張韻聲; born February 1964) is a politician of the People's Republic of China. He is a native of Wuchang, Heilongjiang, and a graduate of the Law Department of Heilongjiang University.

Zhang previously served as a member of the Standing Committee of the Hainan Provincial Committee of the Chinese Communist Party (CCP) and Minister of the United Front Work Department. He also held positions as a member of the Standing Committee of the Ningxia Hui Autonomous Region Party Committee and Secretary of the Political and Legal Affairs Commission, as well as a member of the Standing Committee of the Anhui Provincial Committee, Secretary-General, and Secretary of the Political and Legal Affairs Commission. He currently serves as Vice Chairman of the Standing Committee of the Anhui Provincial People's Congress.

== Biography ==
Zhang Yunsheng was born in February 1964 in Wuchang, Heilongjiang. In September 1981, he began his studies at the Law Department of Heilongjiang University. He joined the Chinese Communist Party (CCP) in January 1985. Upon graduating in July 1985, he began his career as a clerk at the Heilongjiang Provincial High People's Court. In October 1988, he was appointed as a deputy section-level assistant judge at the same court, and in December 1990, he was promoted to section-level assistant judge.

In June 1994, Zhang was transferred to the Hainan Provincial High People's Court as a section-level assistant judge. In August 1996, he was appointed as a deputy division-level judge and secretary to the president of the Hainan Provincial High People's Court. By May 1998, he was promoted to deputy director of the office of the Hainan Provincial High People's Court, while continuing to serve as a deputy division-level judge.

In June 1999, Zhang became deputy director of the office of the Hainan Provincial High People's Court and was promoted to division-level judge. During this period, from August 1999 to December 2001, he was temporarily assigned as deputy president of the Haikou Intermediate People's Court. Additionally, from September 1998 to February 2000, he undertook postgraduate studies in economic law at the China University of Political Science and Law.

In December 2001, Zhang was formally appointed vice president of the Haikou Intermediate People's Court, at the division-level. In May 2003, he became the director of the Legal Affairs Office of the Standing Committee of the Haikou Municipal People's Congress. During this period, from September 2001 to July 2003, he pursued postgraduate studies in law at Renmin University of China, obtaining a master's degree. In July 2003, he was appointed director of the Legal Affairs Committee of the Standing Committee of the Haikou Municipal People's Congress.

In September 2003, Zhang was appointed director and party group secretary of the Haikou Municipal Legal Affairs Bureau. During this time, from September 2003 to July 2006, he pursued a doctoral program in international law at the University of International Business and Economics, earning a doctorate. In August 2007, he was appointed president and party group secretary of the Haikou Intermediate People's Court.

In October 2011, Zhang was appointed a member of the Standing Committee of the CCP Sanya Municipal Committee, deputy secretary of the Party Leadership Group of the Municipal People's Government, and deputy mayor. In June 2012, he was appointed deputy director (at the level of a full department head) and director of the Police Order and Security Department of the Hainan Provincial Public Security Department.

In December 2015, Zhang was appointed chairman and secretary of the Party Committee of Hainan Agricultural Reclamation Investment Holding Group Co., Ltd. In April 2017, he was elected as a member of the Standing Committee of the Hainan Provincial Committee of the Chinese Communist Party and Director of the United Front Work Department.

In January 2018, Zhang was elected as a member of the 13th National Committee of the Chinese People's Political Consultative Conference. In June 2018, he was transferred to the Ningxia Hui Autonomous Region, where he served as a member of the Standing Committee of the CCP Ningxia Hui Autonomous Region Party Committee and Secretary of the Political and Legal Affairs Commission.

In December 2020, Zhang was appointed a member of the Standing Committee of the CCP Anhui Provincial Committee and Secretary of the Political and Legal Affairs Commission. In November 2022, he concurrently served as secretary-general of the Provincial Committee. In January 2024, he was elected vice chairman of the Standing Committee of the Anhui Provincial People's Congress. In March 2024, he stepped down as Secretary of the Political and Legal Affairs Commission of the CCP Anhui Provincial Committee.
