= Song Peizhang =

Chinese politician

Song Peizhang (Chinese: 宋佩璋) (1919–1989) was a senior colonel of the People's Liberation Army and Chinese politician. He was born in Lincheng County, Hebei Province. He was Chinese Communist Party Committee Secretary and Governor of Anhui Province. He was a member of the 10th Central Committee of the Chinese Communist Party and a delegate to the 4th National People's Congress.
