= Wang Taihua =

Chinese politician

Wang Taihua (Chinese: 王太华; born October 1945) is a politician of the People's Republic of China, between 2004 and 2011, he served as director of the State Administration of Radio, Film, and Television (SARFT).

== Biography ==
Born in Xingguo, Jiangxi Province, Wang started working in September 1969, and joined the Chinese Communist Party (CCP) in June 1973. He obtained a postgraduate degree at the CCP Central Party School.

Wang served in Jiangxi for years. In March 1992, he became the secretary of the CCP Hefei municipal committee and a standing member of the CCP Anhui committee. In May of the same year, he was elevated to vice secretary of the CCP Anhui committee while still holding the position of Party chief of Hefei. In October 1998, Wang was appointed vice governor and acting governor of Anhui, and was confirmed as governor in February 1999. In January 2000, he was elevated to secretary of the CCP Anhui committee. In January 2003, Wang was elected chairman of the Anhui provincial People's Congress. He has served as director of the State Administration of Radio, Film, and Television since December 2004.

Wang was an alternate member of the 14th and 15th Central Committees of the Chinese Communist Party, and a full member of the 16th Central Committee. He was a member of the 17th Central Committee of the Chinese Communist Party.

He joined the Chinese People's Political Consultative Conference after he left his position at SARFT.
