= Anhui Provincial Committee of the Chinese Communist Party =

Anhui Provincial Committee of the Chinese Communist Party 中国共产党安徽省委员会

Overview
- Type: Highest decision-making organ when Anhui Provincial Congress is not in session.
- Elected by: Anhui Provincial Congress
- Length of term: Five years
- Term limits: None
- First convocation: January 1952; 74 years ago
- Secretary: Li Lecheng
- Deputy Secretary: Wang Dongwei (Acting Governor); Shan Xiangqian
- Secretary-General: Shan Xiangqian
- Executive organ: Standing Committee
- Inspection organ: Commission for Discipline Inspection

Meeting place
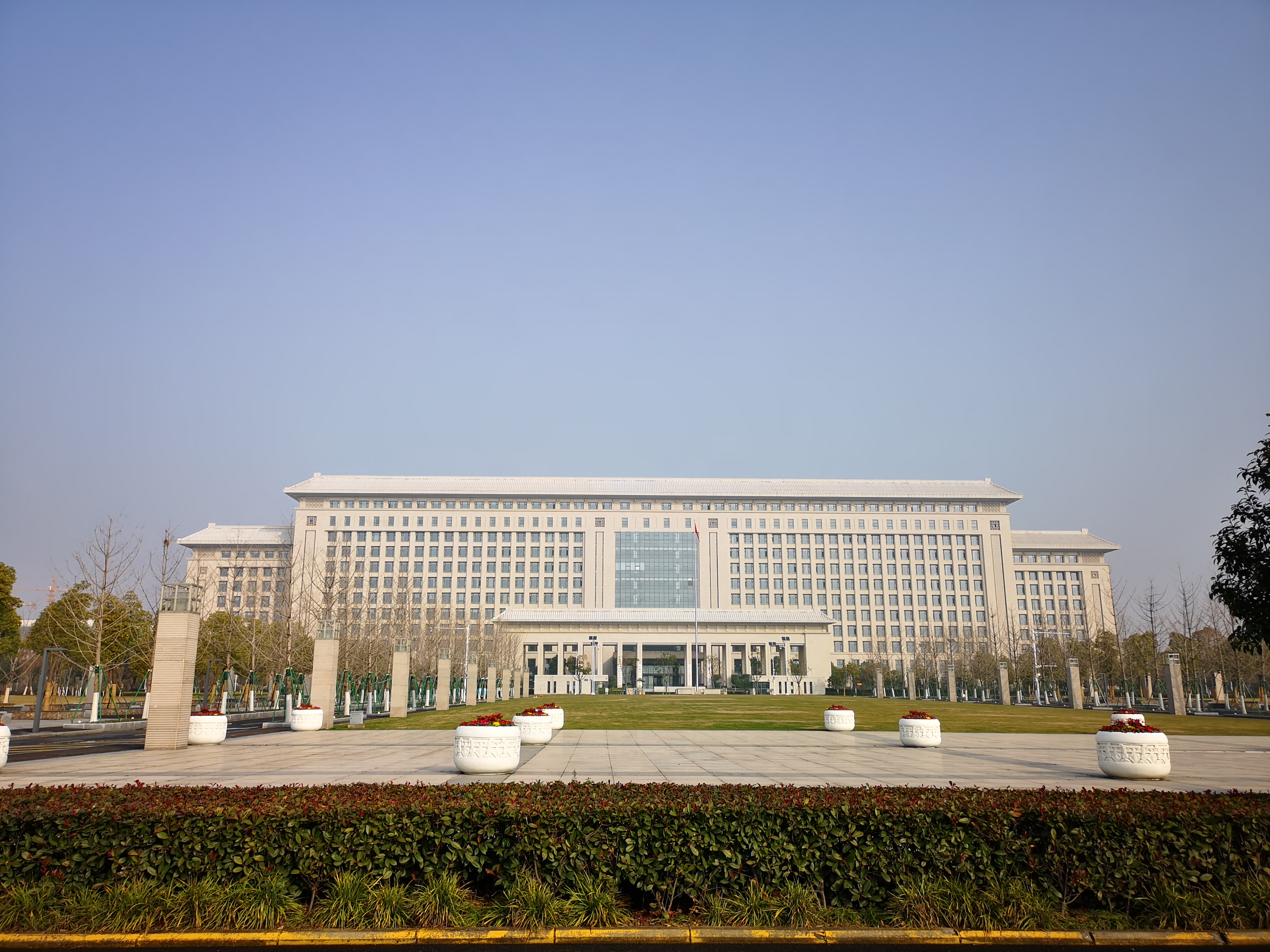
- Headquarters in Hefei, Anhui

Anhui Provincial Committee of the Chinese Communist Party
- Simplified Chinese: 中国共产党安徽省委员会
- Traditional Chinese: 中國共產黨安徽省委員會
Transcriptions
Standard Mandarin
- Hanyu Pinyin: Zhōngguó Gòngchǎndǎng ānhuīshěng Wěiyuánhuì

Abbreviation
- Simplified Chinese: 中共安徽省委
- Traditional Chinese: 中共安徽省委
- Literal meaning: CCP Anhui Provincial Committee
Transcriptions
Standard Mandarin
- Hanyu Pinyin: Zhōnggòng ānhuīshěng Wěi

The Anhui Provincial Committee of the Chinese Communist Party is the provincial committee of the Chinese Communist Party (CCP) in Anhui, China, and the province's top authority. The CCP committee secretary is the highest-ranking post in the province.

== History ==
In February 1949, prior to the Yangtze River Crossing campaign, the Central Committee of the Chinese Communist Party, acknowledging that southern Anhui remained "unliberated," resolved against establishing the CCP Anhui Provincial Party Committee, delineating the Yangtze River as the boundary. Instead, it formed separate Party Committees for northern and southern Anhui, each with distinct leadership for party, government, and military operations. Zeng Xisheng served as the secretary of the Anhui North District Party Committee and the commander of the military region.

The Party Committee of Northern Anhui District was subordinate to the Municipal CCP Committees of Hefei, Bengbu, and Anqing, as well as to the six district committees of Suxian, Fuyang, Chuxian, Lu'an, Chaohu, and Anqing, along with the Huainan Mining District Committee. Xie Fuzhi held the position of secretary of the South Anhui District Committee, which operated under the Wuhu Municipal Committee and the four local committees of Wudang, Xuancheng, Chizhou, and Huizhou.

On January 2, 1952, the CCP Central Committee sanctioned the formation of the Anhui Provincial Committee of the CCP, overseen by the East China Bureau of the Central Committee of the Chinese Communist Party, and dissolved the North Anhui and South Anhui District Party Committees. Zeng Xisheng was appointed secretary of the Anhui Provincial CCP Committee, and in August, the southern and northern Anhui districts were consolidated to become the new Anhui Province. The Central People's Government Committee sanctioned the formation of the Anhui Provincial People's Government Committee, appointing Zeng Xisheng as chairman.

In April 1954, following the dissolution of the East China Bureau of the CCP Central Committee, the Anhui Provincial Committee of the CCP came under the direct authority of the Central Committee of the Chinese Communist Party. Within the jurisdiction of Hefei, Bengbu, Wuhu, and Anqing municipal party committees, together with the local party committees of Suxian, Fuyang, Chu County, Liu'an, Chaohu, Xuancheng, Chizhou, Anqing, and Huizhou, as well as the party committee of the Huainan Mining District. Provincial Party Committee offices in Hefei City.

On April 1, 2016, the Anhui Provincial Committee relocated from its former address at 39 Changjiang Middle Road, Hefei City, to 1 Zhongshan Road, Baohu District, Hefei City. On May 1, 2016, the Anhui Provincial Committee of the Chinese Communist Party and the Anhui Provincial People's Government formally commenced operations at 1 Zhongshan Road, Baohu District, Hefei City.

== Organizations ==
The organization of the Anhui Provincial Committee includes:

- General Office

=== Functional Departments ===
- Organization Department
- Publicity Department
- United Front Work Department
- Political and Legal Affairs Commission
- Social Work Department
- Commission for Discipline Inspection
- Supervisory Commission

=== Offices ===
- Policy Research Office
- Office of the Cyberspace Affairs Commission
- Office of the Foreign Affairs Commission
- Office of the Deepening Reform Commission
- Office of the Institutional Organization Commission
- Office of the Military-civilian Fusion Development Committee
- Taiwan Work Office
- Office of the Leading Group for Inspection Work
- Bureau of Veteran Cadres

=== Dispatched institutions ===
- Working Committee of the Organs Directly Affiliated to the Anhui Provincial Committee

=== Organizations directly under the Committee ===
- Anhui Party School
- Anhui Daily Newspaper Group
- Anhui Institute of Socialism
- Party History Research Office
- Anhui Provincial Archives
- Lecturer Group

=== Organization managed by the work organization ===
- Confidential Bureau

== Leadership ==
=== Heads of the Organization Department ===
Name (English)	Name (Chinese)	Tenure begins	Tenure ends	Note
Ding Xiangqun	丁向群	September 2018	October 2024	

=== Heads of the Publicity Department ===
Name (English)	Name (Chinese)	Tenure begins	Tenure ends	Note
Qian Sanxiong	钱三雄	May 2024		

=== Secretaries of the Political and Legal Affairs Commission ===
Name (English)	Name (Chinese)	Tenure begins	Tenure ends	Note
Yu Aihua	虞爱华	March 2024		

=== Heads of the United Front Work Department ===
Name (English)	Name (Chinese)	Tenure begins	Tenure ends	Note
Zhang Ximing	张西明	April 2020		

== See also ==
- Politics of Anhui
