= Politics of Henan =

Politics of a province of China

The politics of Henan Province in the People's Republic of China is structured in a dual party-government system like all other governing institutions in mainland China.

The Governor of Henan is the highest-ranking official in the People's Government of Henan. However, in the province's dual party-government governing system, the Governor has less power than the Henan Chinese Communist Party (CCP) Provincial Committee Secretary, colloquially termed the "Henan CCP Party Chief".

== List of the CCP Party chiefs ==
No.	Image	Name	Term start	Term end	Ref.
1		Zhang Xi (1912–1959)	October 1949	November 1952	
2		Pan Fusheng (1908–1980)	November 1952	August 1958	
3		Wu Zhipu (1906–1967)	August 1958	July 1961	
4		Liu Jianxun (1913–1983)	July 1961	October 1978	
5		Duan Junyi (1910–2004)	October 1978	January 1981	
6		Liu Jie (1915–2018)	January 1981	May 1985	
7		Yang Xizong (1928–2007)	May 1985	March 1990	
8		Hou Zongbin (1929–2017)	March 1990	December 1992	
9		Li Changchun (born 1944)	December 1992	February 1998	
10		Ma Zhongchen (born 1936)	February 1998	October 2000	
11		Chen Kuiyuan (born 1941)	October 2000	December 2002	
12		Li Keqiang (1955–2023)	29 December 2002	14 December 2004	
13		Xu Guangchun (1944–2022)	14 December 2004	30 November 2009	
14		Lu Zhangong (born 1952)	30 November 2009	March 2013	
15		Guo Gengmao (born 1950)	March 2013	26 March 2016	
16		Xie Fuzhan (born 1954)	26 March 2016	21 March 2018	
17		Wang Guosheng (born 1956)	21 March 2018	1 June 2021	
18		Lou Yangsheng (born 1959)	1 June 2021	31 December 2024	
19		Liu Ning (born 1962)	31 December 2024	Incumbent	

== List of governors ==
1. Wu Zhipu: 1949–1962
2. Wen Minsheng: 1962–1967
3. Liu Jianxun: 1968–1978
4. Duan Junyi: 1978–1979
5. Liu Jie: 1979–1981
6. Dai Suli (acting): 1981–1982
7. Yu Mingtao (acting): 1982–1983
8. He Zhukang: 1983–1987
9. Cheng Weigao: 1987–1990
10. Li Changchun: 1990–1993
11. Ma Zhongchen: 1993–1998
12. Li Keqiang: 1998–2003
13. Li Chengyu: 2003–2008
14. Guo Gengmao: 2008–2013
15. Xie Fuzhan: 2013–2016
16. Chen Run'er: 2016–2019
17. Yin Hong: 2019–2021
18. Wang Kai: 2021–

== List of chairmen of Henan People's Congress ==
1. Hu Lijiao (胡立教): 1979–1981
2. Liu Jie (刘杰): 1981–1983
3. Zhao Wenfu (赵文甫): 1983–1985
4. Zhang Shude (张树德): 1985–1988
5. Lin Xiao (林晓): 1988–1989
6. Yang Xizong (杨析综): 1989–1992
7. Lin Xiao (林晓): 1992–1993
8. Li Changchun (李长春): 1993–1998
9. Ren Keli (任克礼): 1998–2003
10. Li Keqiang (李克强): 2003–2005
11. Xu Guangchun (徐光春): 2005–2010
12. Lu Zhangong (卢展工): 2010–2014
13. Guo Gengmao: 2013–2016
14. Xie Fuzhan: 2016–2018
15. Wang Guosheng: 2018–incumbent

== List of chairmen of CPPCC Henan Committee ==
1. Pan Fusheng (潘复生): 1955–1959
2. Wu Zhipu (吴芝圃): 1959–1962
3. Liu Jianxun (刘建勋): 1962–1966, 1977–1979
4. Zhao Wenfu (赵文甫): 1979–1983
5. Wang Huayun (王化云): 1983–1985
6. Song Yuxi (宋玉玺): 1985–1988
7. Yan Jimin (阎济民): 1988–1993
8. Lin Yinghai (林英海): 1993–2003
9. Fan Qinchen (范钦臣): 2003–2006
10. Wang Quanshu (王全书): 2006–2011
11. Ye Dongsong (叶冬松): 2011–2018
12. Liu Wei (刘伟): 2018–incumbent
