= Henan Provincial People's Government =

Henan Provincial People's Government 河南省人民政府
- Established: May 10, 1949; 77 years ago

Leadership
- Governor: Wang Lujin; 24 September 2024
- Parent body: Central People's Government; Henan Provincial People's Congress
- Elected by: Henan Provincial People's Congress

Meeting place
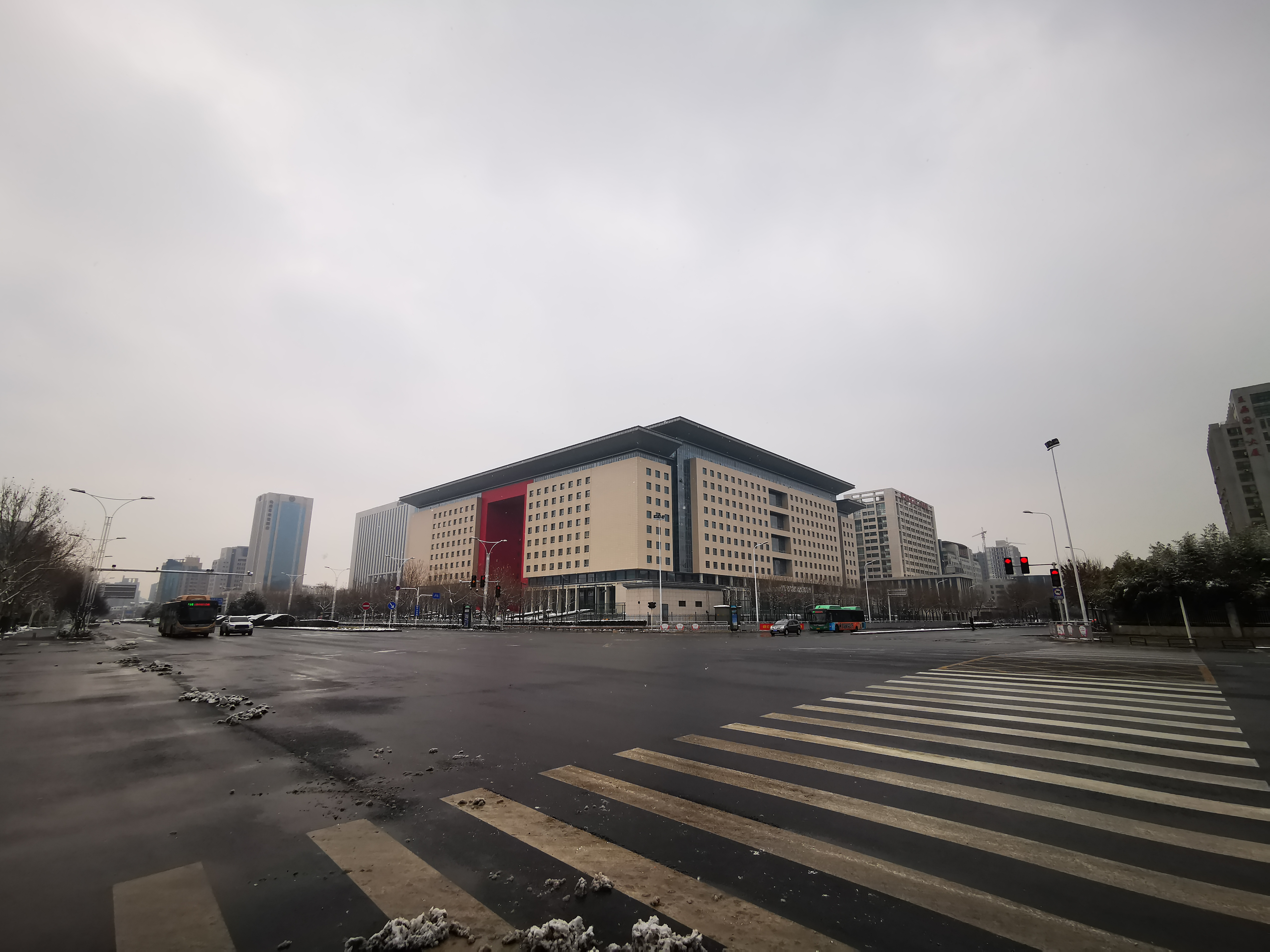
- Headquarters

Website
- www.henan.gov.cn

The Henan Provincial People's Government is the local administrative agency of Henan. It is officially elected by the Henan Provincial People's Congress and is formally responsible to the Henan Provincial People's Congress and its Standing Committee. Under the country's one-party system, the governor is subordinate to the secretary of the Henan Provincial Committee of the Chinese Communist Party. The Provincial government is headed by a governor, currently Wang Kai.

== History ==
On 10 May 1949, the Henan Provincial People's Government was formally established. In April 1950, the first Henan Provincial People's Government was elected by the first People's Congress of Henan Province. In 1952, Pingyuan Province was abolished and most of it was merged into Henan Province. In February 1955, it was reorganized into the Henan Provincial People's Committee. In January 1968, it was reorganized into the Henan Provincial Revolutionary Committee. In September 1979, the Henan Provincial Revolutionary Committee was abolished and the Henan Provincial People's Government was re-established.

== Organization ==
The organization of the Henan Provincial People's Government includes:

- General Office of the Henan Provincial People's Government

=== Component Departments ===
- Henan Provincial Development and Reform Commission
- Henan Provincial Department of Education
- Henan Provincial Department of Science and Technology
- Henan Provincial Department of Industry and Information Technology
- Henan Provincial Ethnic and Religious Affairs Committee
- Henan Provincial Public Security Department
- Henan Provincial Department of Civil Affairs
- Henan Provincial Department of Justice
- Henan Provincial Department of Finance
- Henan Provincial Department of Human Resources and Social Security
- Henan Provincial Department of Natural Resources
- Henan Provincial Department of Ecology and Environment
- Henan Provincial Department of Housing and Urban-Rural Development
- Henan Provincial Department of Transportation
- Henan Provincial Water Resources Department
- Henan Provincial Department of Agriculture and Rural Affairs
- Henan Provincial Department of Commerce
- Henan Provincial Department of Culture and Tourism
- Henan Provincial Health Commission
- Henan Provincial Department of Veterans Affairs
- Henan Provincial Emergency Management Department
- Henan Provincial Audit Office

=== Directly affiliated special institution ===
- State-owned Assets Supervision and Administration Commission of Henan Provincial People's Government

=== Organizations under the government ===
- Henan Provincial Administration for Market Regulation
- Henan Provincial Radio and Television Bureau
- Henan Provincial Sports Bureau
- Henan Provincial Bureau of Statistics
- Henan Provincial Grain and Material Reserve Bureau
- Henan Provincial Medical Insurance Bureau
- Henan Provincial Government Affairs Bureau
- Henan Provincial National Defense Mobilization Office
- Henan Provincial People's Government Research Office
- Henan Provincial Rural Revitalization Bureau
- Henan Provincial Petition Bureau

=== Departmental management organization ===
- The Henan Provincial Administrative Approval and Government Information Management Bureau is managed by the Provincial Government Office.
- The Henan Provincial Energy Planning and Construction Bureau is managed by the Provincial Development and Reform Commission.
- The Henan Provincial Prison Administration Bureau is managed by the Provincial Department of Justice.
- Henan Provincial Forestry Bureau is managed by the Provincial Department of Natural Resources.
- The Henan Provincial Cultural Relics Bureau is managed by the Provincial Department of Culture and Tourism.
- The Henan Provincial Drug Administration is managed by the Provincial Market Supervision Bureau.

=== Directly affiliated institutions ===
- Henan Academy of Sciences
- Henan Academy of Social Sciences
- Henan Provincial Museum of Literature and History
- Henan Provincial Geological Bureau
- Henan Institute of Geology
- China Council for the Promotion of International Trade Henan Provincial Committee
- Henan Provincial Supply and Marketing Cooperative
- Henan Radio and Television
- Henan Public Resources Trading Center
- Henan Provincial Local History Office
- Henan Provincial Reception Office

=== Dispatched agency ===
- Jiyuan Industry-City Integration Demonstration Zone Management Committee
- Henan Provincial People's Government Office in Beijing
- Henan Provincial People's Government Office in Guangzhou
- Henan Provincial People's Government Office in Shanghai

== See also ==
- Politics of Henan
  - Henan Provincial People's Congress
  - Henan Provincial People's Government
    - Governor of Henan
  - Henan Provincial Committee of the Chinese Communist Party
    - Party Secretary of Henan
  - Henan Provincial Committee of the Chinese People's Political Consultative Conference
