= Henan Provincial Committee of the Chinese People's Political Consultative Conference =

Henan Provincial Committee of the Chinese People's Political Consultative Conference 中国人民政治协商会议河南省委员会
- 12th
- Emblem of the Chinese People's Political Consultative Conference

Type
- Type: United front organ Constitutional convention (Historical); Legislature (Historical) of Chinese People's Political Consultative Conference

History
- Founded: February 21, 1955; 71 years ago
- Preceded by: Henan Provincial People's Congress Consultative Committee

Leadership
- Chairperson: Kong Changsheng

Website
- www.hnzx.gov.cn

Chinese name
- Simplified Chinese: 中国人民政治协商会议河南省委员会
- Traditional Chinese: 中國人民政治協商會議河南省委員會
Transcriptions
Standard Mandarin
- Hanyu Pinyin: Zhōngguó Rénmín Zhèngzhì Xiéshāng Huìyì Hénánshěng Wěiyuánhuì

Abbreviation
- Simplified Chinese: 河南省政协
- Traditional Chinese: 河南省政協
- Literal meaning: CPPCC Henan Provincial Committee
Transcriptions
Standard Mandarin
- Hanyu Pinyin: Hénánshěng Zhèngxié

The Henan Provincial Committee of the Chinese People's Political Consultative Conference (Chinese: 中国人民政治协商会议河南省委员会; abbreviation CPPCC Henan Provincial Committee) is the provincial advisory body and a local organization of the Chinese People's Political Consultative Conference in Henan, China. It is supervised and directed by the Henan Provincial Committee of the Chinese Communist Party.

== History ==
The Henan Provincial Committee of the Chinese People's Political Consultative Conference traces its origins to the Henan Provincial People's Congress Consultative Committee (河南省各界人民代表会议协商委员会), founded in 1950.

== Term ==
=== 1st ===
- Term: February 1955–February 1959
- Chairperson: Pan Fusheng
- Vice Chairpersons: Yang Weiping, Wang Guohua, Hou Lianying, Wang Yizhai, Liu Hongwen, Gao Zhenwu, Liu Jixue, Ren Zhiming, Tian Feng, Zhang Zhonglu
- Secretary-General: Zhang Jianshi

=== 2nd ===
- Term: February 1959–September 1964
- Chairperson: Wu Zhifu → Liu Jianxun
- Vice Chairpersons: Yang Weiping, Liu Hongwen, Liu Yanchun, Wang Guohua, Tian Feng, Gao Zhenwu, Ren Zhiming, Li Fudu, Du Mengmo, Liu Yangqiao
- Secretary-General: Zhao Zhiping

=== 3rd ===
- Term: September 1964–1966
- Chairperson: Liu Jianxun
- Vice Chairpersons: Yang Weiping, Liu Hongwen, Liu Mingbang, Liu Yanchun, Wang Guohua, Tian Feng, Gao Zhenwu, Ren Zhiming, Li Fudu, Du Mengmo
- Secretary-General: Zhao Zhiping

=== 4th ===
- Term: December 1977–April 1983
- Chairperson: Liu Jianxun → Zhao Wenfu
- Vice Chairpersons: Hu Lijiao, Liu Hongwen, Zhao Wenfu, Liu Mingbang, Zhang Baiyuan, Wu Shaokui, Peng Xiaoqian, Wang Huayun, Huo Bingquan, Li Fudu, Guo Peijun, Dong Minsheng, Ye Renshou, Zhou Junming, Qi Wenjian, Yu Keqin, Jin Shaoying, Zhang Zhen, Cui Ziming, Zhang Zengjing, Liu Xicheng, Rong Yude
- Secretary-General: Zhu Lun → Jin Shaoying (concurrently)

=== 5th ===
- Term: April 1983–January 1988
- Chairperson: Wang Huayun → Song Yuxi (from June 1985)
- Vice Chairpersons: Song Yuxi, Li Fuxiang, Qi Wenjian, Zhang Baiyuan, Dong Minsheng, Ye Renshou, Jin Shaoying, Hao Fuhong, Liu Xicheng, Rong Yude, Zuo Mingsheng, Ren Fangqiu, Duan Zongsan, Ding Zhenyu, Yan Jimin (from June 1985), Cui Guanghua (from June 1985), Ren Leiyuan (from June 1985), Tu Jiaji (from June 1985)
- Secretary-General: Not listed in original, but based on context, it might be omitted or implied; however, the original does not specify a Secretary-General for this term, so I will not add it.

=== 6th ===
- Term: January 1988–April 1993
- Chairperson: Yan Jimin
- Vice Chairpersons: Zhao Zhengfu, Wei Qingong, Dong Minsheng, Ye Renshou, Liu Xicheng, Zuo Mingsheng, Ren Fangqiu, Duan Zongsan, Ding Zhenyu, Tu Jiaji, Li Runtian, Liu Yujie (from April 1989)
- Secretary-General: Not listed in original, so omitted.

=== 7th ===
- Term: April 1993–January 1998
- Chairperson: Lin Yinghai
- Vice Chairpersons: Hu Tiyun, Liu Yujie, Zuo Mingsheng, Tu Jiaji, Hu Tijian, Yao Ruxue, Zhu Shuquan, Mei Yangzheng, Shao Lingfang
- Secretary-General: Not listed in original, so omitted.

=== 8th ===
- Term: January 1998–January 2003
- Chairperson: Lin Yinghai
- Vice Chairpersons: Yao Ruxue, Zhang Guorong, Guo Guosan, Hu Tingji, Mei Yangzheng, Yang Xianming, Yang Guangxi, Feng Hongshun, Zhang Hanying, Zhang Guangxing, Zhang Yulin, Li Qingbiao (from September 1998)
- Secretary-General: Not listed in original, so omitted.

=== 9th ===
- Term: January 2003–January 2008
- Chairperson: Fan Qinchen
- Vice Chairpersons: Zhang Tao, Zhang Hanying, Zhang Guangxing, Zhang Yulin, Chen Yichu, Mao Zenghua, Cao Cewen, Liu Qiwen, Zhao Jiangtao
- Secretary-General: Yu Baojiang

=== 10th ===
- Term: January 2008–January 2013
- Chairperson: Wang Quanshu
- Vice Chairpersons: Wang Xunzhi, Jin Suidong, Deng Yongjian, Yuan Zuliang, Wang Ping, Li Yingjie, Gong Liqun, Liang Jing, Zhang Yazhong
- Secretary-General: Zhang Bingyi

=== 11th ===
- Term: January 2013–January 2018
- Chairperson: Ye Dongsong
- Vice Chairpersons: Deng Yongjian, Li Yingjie, Gong Liqun, Liang Jing, Zhang Yazhong, Gao Tijian, Jin Kewen, Zhang Weining
- Secretary-General: Guo Junmin

=== 12th ===
- Term: January 2018–January 2023
- Chairperson: Liu Wei
- Vice Chairpersons: Qian Guoyu (until January 2021), Li Yingjie, Gong Liqun (until January 2022), Zhang Yazhong, Gao Tijian, Zhou Chunyan, Xie Yu'an, Zhang Zhenyu, Liu Jiongtian, Zhu Huanran (from January 2021), Dai Bohua (from January 2022), Huo Jinhua (from January 2022)
- Secretary-General: Wang Shushan (until September 2020), Wang Zhongshan (from January 2021)

=== 13th ===
- Term: January 2023–2028
- Chairperson: Kong Changsheng
- Vice Chairpersons: Zhang Zhenyu, Zhu Huanran, Dai Bohua, Huo Jinhua, Xie Yu'an, Liu Jiongtian (until January 2025), Wang Zhanying (from January 2025), Sun Yunfeng (from January 2025)
- Secretary-General: Wang Zhongshan
