= Henan Provincial Committee of the Chinese Communist Party =

Henan Provincial Committee of the Chinese Communist Party 中国共产党河南省委员会

Overview
- Type: Highest decision-making organ when Henan Provincial Congress is not in session.
- Elected by: Henan Provincial Congress
- Length of term: Five years
- Term limits: None
- First convocation: 1949
- Secretary: Zhou Zuyi
- Deputy Secretary: Wang Lujin (Acting Governor); Zhang Wei
- Secretary-General: Li Tao
- Executive organ: Standing Committee
- Inspection organ: Commission for Discipline Inspection

Henan Provincial Committee of the Chinese Communist Party
- Simplified Chinese: 中国共产党河南省委员会
- Traditional Chinese: 中國共產黨河南省委員會
Transcriptions
Standard Mandarin
- Hanyu Pinyin: Zhōngguó Gòngchǎndǎng Hénánshěng Wěiyuánhuì

Abbreviation
- Simplified Chinese: 中共河南省委
- Traditional Chinese: 中共河南省委
- Literal meaning: CCP Henan Provincial Committee
Transcriptions
Standard Mandarin
- Hanyu Pinyin: Zhōnggòng Hénánshěng Wěi

The Henan Provincial Committee of the Chinese Communist Party is the provincial committee of the Chinese Communist Party (CCP) in Henan. The CCP committee secretary is the highest ranking post in the province. The current secretary is Zhou Zuyi, who succeeded Liu Ning on 23 September 2026.

== History ==
In December 1921, the first CCP organization in Henan was established in Luoyang.

In 1949, the Henan Provincial Committee of the CCP was established.

== Organization ==
The organization of the Henan Provincial Committee includes:

- General Office

=== Functional Departments ===
- Organization Department
- Publicity Department
- United Front Work Department
- Political and Legal Affairs Commission

=== Offices ===
- Policy Research Office
- Office of the Comprehensively Deepening Reforms Commission
- Office of the Cyberspace Affairs Commission
- Office of the Foreign Affairs Commission
- Office of the Institutional Organization Commission
- Office of the Military-civilian Fusion Development Committee
- Office of the Leading Group for Inspection Work
- Bureau of Veteran Cadres

=== Dispatched institutions ===
- Working Committee of the Organs Directly Affiliated to the Henan Provincial Committee
- Jiyuan Industry-City Integration Demonstration Zone Working Committee (Deputy Department-level)

=== Organizations directly under the Committee ===
- Henan Party School
- Henan Institute of Socialism
- Henan Daily
- Party History Research Office
- Henan Provincial Archives

== Leadership ==
=== Party Committees ===
10th Provincial Party Committee (November 2016 – October 2021)

- Secretary: Xie Fuzhan (until 21 March 2018), Wang Guosheng (21 March 2018 – 1 June 2021), Lou Yangsheng (from 1 June 2021)
- Deputy Secretaries: Chen Run'er (until October 2019), Deng Kai (until February 2017), Wang Jiong (May 2017–January 2018), Yu Hongqiu (July 2018–November 2019), Yin Hong (November 2019–March 2021), Wang Kai (from April 2021), Kong Changsheng (from July 2021)
- Standing Committee members: Xie Fuzhan (until 21 March 2018), Chen Run'er (until October 2019), Deng Kai (until February 2017), Weng Jieming (until March 2018), Zhao Suping (until February 2019), Ren Zhengxiao (until December 2020), Xia Jie (until February 2017), Li Ya, Tao Minglun (until November 2017), Xu Ganlu (until March 2018), Ma Yi (until June 2019), Mu Weimin, Kong Changsheng (from February 2017), Wang Jiong (May 2017–January 2018), Sun Shougang (from November 2017), Hu Yongsheng (January 2018–May 2020), Wang Guosheng (21 March 2018 – 1 June 2021), Huang Qiang (June 2018–December 2020), Yu Hongqiu (July 2018–November 2019), Jiang Ling (from July 2018), Xu Liyi (from June 2019), Gan Rongkun (September 2019–June 2021, put under investigation), Yin Hong (November 2019–March 2021), Chen Zhaoming (from May 2020), Zhou Ji (from December 2020), Qu Xiaoli (from January 2021), Wang Kai (March 2021-), Lou Yangsheng (from May 2021), Chen Shun (from September 2021)

11th Provincial Party Committee (October 2021 – October 2026)

- Secretary: Lou Yangsheng (until 31 December 2024), Liu Ning (31 December 2024 - 23 September 2026), Zhou Zuyi (from 23 September 2026)
- Deputy Secretaries: Wang Kai (until 23 September 2026), Zhou Ji (until July 2023), Sun Meijun (November 2023 - January 2025), Zhang Wei (from 16 May 2025), Wang Lujin (from 23 September 2026)
- Standing Committee members: Lou Yangsheng, Wang Kai, Zhou Ji (until July 2023), Sun Shougang, Chen Shun (until April 2023), Jiang Ling, Qu Xiaoli (until September 2023), Wang Zhanying, Fei Dongbin (until September 2022), Chen Xing, Wang Dongwei (until July 2022), An Wei, Xu Yuanhong, Zhang Leiming (from December 2022), Wang Gang (from May 2023), Sun Meijun (from November 2023), Zhang Wei (from December 2023)

12th Provincial Party Committee (October 2026 –)

- Secretary: Zhou Zuyi
- Deputy Secretaries: Wang Lujin, Zhang Wei
- Standing Committee members: Zhou Zuyi, Wang Lujin, Zhang Wei, Qin Guowen, Wang Gang, Zhang Min, Wang Song, Chen Chunjiang, Li Tao, Zheng Haiyang, Zhang Lugang, Yang Xiaojing, Xu Xiangfeng
