= Wang Weiguang =

Chinese politician

- 王伟光

Chairperson of the Ethnic and Religious Affairs Committee of the Chinese People's Political Consultative Conference
- In office 16 March 2018 – 13 March 2023
- Preceded by: Zhu Weiqun
- Succeeded by: Zhang Yijiong

President of the University of Chinese Academy of Social Sciences
- In office May 2017 – March 2018
- Preceded by: New title
- Succeeded by: Zhang Zhengwen

President of the Chinese Academy of Social Sciences
- In office April 2013 – March 2018
- Preceded by: Chen Kuiyuan
- Succeeded by: Xie Fuzhan

Personal details
- Born: February 1950 (age 76) Dandong, Liaoning, China
- Party: Chinese Communist Party
- Education: Peking University

Chinese name
- Simplified Chinese: 王伟光
- Traditional Chinese: 王偉光
Transcriptions
Standard Mandarin
- Hanyu Pinyin: Wáng Wěiguāng

Wang Weiguang (Chinese: 王伟光; born February 1950) is a Chinese politician and academic who served as president of the University of Chinese Academy of Social Sciences from 2017 to 2018 and president of the Chinese Academy of Social Sciences from 2013 to 2018. He previously served as vice president of the academy and before that, vice president of the Central Party School of the Chinese Communist Party. He was a delegate to the 10th National People's Congress. He was a representative of the 19th National Congress of the Chinese Communist Party. He is a member of the 13th National Committee of the Chinese People's Political Consultative Conference and a Marxist theoretician at the Advanced Research Institute for 21st Century Chinese Marxism of the CASS University.

He was an alternate of the 17th Central Committee of the Chinese Communist Party and was a member of the 18th Central Committee of the Chinese Communist Party.

== Biography ==
Wang was born in Dandong, Liaoning, in February 1950, while his ancestral home in Rushan, Shandong. Beginning in November 1967, he served in several posts in Heilongjiang Production and Construction Corps, including soldier, accountant, clerical officer, officer of the political department of a regiment, a company instructor, and a member of the party committee of a regiment.

After resuming the college entrance examination, in 1978, Wang entered Peking University, majoring in philosophy. After university in 1982, he was assigned to the Central Party School of the Chinese Communist Party, where he was promoted to associate professor in December 1987 and to full professor in July 1993. He moved up the ranks to become vice-president in February 1998.

He was appointed vice president of the Chinese Academy of Social Sciences in December 2007, becoming executive vice-president in July 2011 and dean and president in April 2013. He also served as president of the newly founded University of Chinese Academy of Social Sciences from May 2017 to March 2018.

In March 2018, he was made chairperson of the Ethnic and Religious Affairs Committee of the Chinese People's Political Consultative Conference.

== Academic works ==
- 新时代中国特色社会主义的理论成果 [Theoretical Achievements of Socialism with Chinese Characteristics in the New Era] (in Chinese). Beijing: Social Sciences Academic Press. 2018. ISBN 9787520124942.
- 马克思主义与社会主义的历史命运 [Historical Destiny of Marxism and Socialism] (in Chinese). Beijing: Social Sciences Academic Press. 2013. ISBN 9787509749050.
- 新冠肺炎疫情与国际时局 [The Epidemic Situation of COVID-19 and the International Situation] (in Chinese). Beijing: China Social Sciences Press. 2021. ISBN 9787520394789.
- 改革开放与中国特色社会主义道路 [Reform and Opening Up and the Road of Socialism with Chinese Characteristics] (in Chinese). Beijing: China Yanshi Publishing House. 2021. ISBN 9787517137382.
- 社会矛盾论 [Social Contradiction Theory] (in Chinese). Beijing: China Social Sciences Press. 2019. ISBN 9787500496830.
- 利益论 [Interest Theory] (in Chinese). Beijing: China Social Sciences Press. 2019. ISBN 9787500486701.
- 马克思主义中国化的新成果—习近平治国理政思想研究 [New Achievements of the Sinicization of Marxism: A Study on Xi Jinping's Thought of Governing the Country] (in Chinese). Beijing: China Social Sciences Press. 2016. ISBN 9787516177587.
- 大的历史时代与中国特色社会主义新时代 [The Great Historical Era and the New Era of Socialism with Chinese Characteristics] (in Chinese). Beijing: China Social Sciences Press. 2019. ISBN 9787520348270.
- 哲林漫步 [Walking in the Philosophy Forest] (in Chinese). Beijing: China Social Sciences Press. 2013. ISBN 9787516133682.
- 新型城镇化与城乡发展一体化 [New Urbanization and Integration of Urban and Rural Development] (in Chinese). Beijing: Workers Publishing House. 2014. ISBN 9787500857242.
- 学好哲学 终生受用 [Learn Philosophy Well and Benefit for Life] (in Chinese). Beijing: China Social Sciences Press. 2014. ISBN 9787516147696.
- 开辟当代马克思主义哲学新境界 [Opening Up a New Realm of Contemporary Marxist Philosophy] (in Chinese). Beijing: China Social Sciences Press. 2019. ISBN 9787520340281.
- 新大众哲学 [New Popular Philosophy] (in Chinese). Beijing: China Social Sciences Press. 2014. ISBN 9787516122860.
- 世界社会主义的趋势、问题与现状 [Trends, Problems and Current Situation of World Socialism] (in Chinese). Beijing: China Social Sciences Press. 2020. ISBN 9787520367912.

Academic offices
Preceded by Chen Kuiyuan	President of the Chinese Academy of Social Sciences; 2013–2018	Succeeded by Xie Fuzhan
Educational offices
New title	President of the University of Chinese Academy of Social Sciences; 2017–2018	Succeeded by Zhang Zhengwen
Assembly seats
Preceded by Zhu Weiqun	Chairperson of the Ethnic and Religious Affairs Committee of the Chinese People's Political Consultative Conference; 2018–present	Incumbent
