= Tian Congming =

Chinese politician and news executive

- 田聪明

Chairperson of the Ethnic and Religious Affairs Committee of the Chinese People's Political Consultative Conference
- In office March 2008 – March 2013
- Preceded by: Niu Maosheng
- Succeeded by: Zhu Weiqun

President of Xinhua News Agency
- In office June 2000 – April 2008
- Preceded by: Guo Chaoren
- Succeeded by: Li Congjun

Director of the State Administration of Radio, Film and Television
- In office April 1998 – June 2000
- Preceded by: New title
- Succeeded by: Xu Guangchun

Personal details
- Born: May 1943 Fugu County, Shaanxi, China
- Died: 26 December 2017 (aged 74) Beijing, China
- Party: Chinese Communist Party
- Education: Beijing Normal University

Chinese name
- Simplified Chinese: 田聪明
- Traditional Chinese: 田聰明
Transcriptions
Standard Mandarin
- Hanyu Pinyin: Tián Cōngmíng

Tian Congming (Chinese: 田聪明; May 1943 – 26 December 2017) was a Chinese politician who served as director of the State Administration of Radio, Film and Television from 1998 to 2000, president of Xinhua News Agency from 2000 to 2008, and chairperson of the Ethnic and Religious Affairs Committee of the Chinese People's Political Consultative Conference from 2008 to 2013.

He was a representative of the 14th, 15th, 16th, and 17th National Congress of the Chinese Communist Party. He was a member of the 14th and 15th Central Commission for Discipline Inspection. He was a member of the 16th Central Committee of the Chinese Communist Party. He was a member of the Standing Committee of the 11th Chinese People's Political Consultative Conference.

== Biography ==
Tian was born in Fugu County, Shaanxi, in May 1943. His father died early and he was brought up by his mother. In 1965 he was accepted to Beijing Normal University and joined the Chinese Communist Party (CCP) in December of that same year. After graduation in 1970, he stayed at the university.

In April 1972, he became an official in Bayannur League, Inner Mongolia, and joined the Inner Mongolia Branch of Xinhua News Agency in October 1975. He was appointed secretary for the General Office of the CCP Inner Mongolia Autonomous Regional Committee in March 1980, concurrently serving as deputy director of the Policy Research Office of the CCP Inner Mongolia Autonomous Regional Committee. He was appointed secretary-general of the CCP Inner Mongolia Autonomous Regional Committee in March 1983 and was admitted to member of the Standing Committee of the CCP Inner Mongolia Autonomous Regional Committee, the region's top authority. He was elevated to deputy party secretary of the region in January 1987.

In December 1988, he was transferred to southwest China's Tibet Autonomous Region and appointed deputy party secretary.

In October 1990, he became deputy director of Ministry of Radio, Film and Television (later reshuffled as State Administration of Radio, Film and Television), rising to director in March 1998. He was president of Xinhua News Agency in June 2000, and held that office until April 2008. He was also president of All-China Journalists Association from October 2006 to November 2016. In March 2008, he took office as chairperson of the Ethnic and Religious Affairs Committee of the Chinese People's Political Consultative Conference, and served until March 2013.

On 26 December 2017, he died from an illness in Beijing, at the age of 74.

Government offices
New title	Director of the State Administration of Radio, Film and Television; 1998–2000	Succeeded by Xu Guangchun
Media offices
Preceded by Guo Chaoren	President of Xinhua News Agency; 2000–2008	Succeeded by Li Congjun
Non-profit organization positions
Preceded by Shao Huaze	president of All-China Journalists Association; 2006–2016	Succeeded by Zhang Yannong
Assembly seats
Preceded by Niu Maosheng	Chairperson of the Ethnic and Religious Affairs Committee of the Chinese People's Political Consultative Conference; 2008–2013	Succeeded by Zhu Weiqun
