= Committee for Ethnic and Religious Affairs =

Special Committee of the CPPCC National Committee

- 中国人民政治协商会议全国委员会 民族和宗教委员会
- Formation: March 15, 1995; 31 years ago
- Type: Special committee of the CPPCC
- Location: Beijing
- Chairperson: Zhang Yijiong
- Parent organization: National Committee of the Chinese People's Political Consultative Conference

Chinese name
- Simplified Chinese: 中国人民政治协商会议全国委员会民族和宗教委员会
- Traditional Chinese: 中國人民政治協商會議全國委員會民族和宗教委員會
Transcriptions
Standard Mandarin
- Hanyu Pinyin: Zhōngguó Rénmín Zhèngzhì Xiéshāng Huìyì Quánguó Wěiyuánhuì Mínzú Hé Zōngjiào Wěiyuánhuì

Shortest form
- Simplified Chinese: 全国政协民族和宗教委员会
- Traditional Chinese: 全國政協民族和宗教委員會
Transcriptions
Standard Mandarin
- Hanyu Pinyin: Quánguó Zhèngxié Mínzú Hé Zōngjiào Wěiyuánhuì

The Committee for Ethnic and Religious Affairs is one of ten special committees of the National Committee of the Chinese People's Political Consultative Conference, China's top political advisory body and a central part of the Chinese Communist Party's united front system.

== History ==
The Ethnic and Religious Affairs Committee was created in March 1995 during the 8th National Committee of the Chinese People's Political Consultative Conference.

== Functions ==
The committee conducts political consultations and supervises policy consultations in affairs related to ethnic minorities and religions, including Xinjiang and Tibet.

== List of chairpersons ==
| No. | Chairpersons | Took office | Left office | Notes |
|---|---|---|---|---|
| 7th | Yang Jingren | June 1988 | 21 May 1993 | |
| 7th | Zhao Puchu | June 1988 | 21 May 1993 | |
| 8th | Jin Jian | 21 May 1993 | 16 March 1998 | |
| 8th | Zhao Puchu | 21 May 1993 | 16 March 1998 | |
| 9th | Uliji | 16 March 1998 | 15 March 2003 | |
| 10th | Niu Maosheng | 15 March 2003 | 15 March 2008 | |
| 11th | Tian Congming | 15 March 2008 | 13 March 2013 | |
| 12th | Zhu Weiqun | 13 March 2013 | 16 March 2018 | |
| 13th | Wang Weiguang | 16 March 2018 | 13 March 2023 | |
| 14th | Zhang Yijiong | 13 March 2023 | Incumbent | |

== See also ==
- Ethnic Affairs Committee of the NPC
- National Ethnic Affairs Commission
- National Religious Affairs Administration
