= Xu Guang =

Chinese politician

- 徐光

Vice-Governor of Henan
- In office January 2017 – September 2019
- Governor: Chen Run'er

Communist Party Secretary of Zhoukou
- In office November 2011 – February 2017
- Preceded by: Mao Chaofeng
- Succeeded by: Liu Jibiao

Mayor of Zhoukou
- In office December 2006 – November 2011
- Preceded by: Gao Deling
- Succeeded by: Yue Wenhai

Personal details
- Born: June 1960 (age 66) Dangyang, Hubei, China
- Party: Chinese Communist Party (expelled; 1984–2020)
- Education: Hebi Normal School; Tianjin University; Henan Radio and Television University

Xu Guang (Chinese: 徐光; pinyin: Xú Guāng; born June 1960) is a former Chinese politician who spent his whole career in north China's Henan province. He was investigated by China's top anti-graft body, the Chinese Communist Party Central Commission for Discipline Inspection and the National Supervisory Commission, in August 2019. He was then sentenced to 11 years in jail on January 11, 2021. Previously he served as vice-governor of Henan.

He was a delegate to the 11th National People's Congress and a delegate to the 18th National Congress of the Chinese Communist Party.

== Early life and education ==
Xu was born in Dangyang, Hubei, in June 1960. He entered the workforce in August 1977 and joined the Chinese Communist Party in June 1984. After the Cultural Revolution in September 1979, he entered Hebi Normal School, where he majored in Chinese language and literature. He also studied at Henan Radio and Television University and Tianjin University as a part-time student.

== Career ==
After university in July 1981, he was assigned to the Hebi Municipal Education Bureau. In May 1988 he became Deputy Communist Party Secretary, rising to Communist Party Secretary four months later. In November 1992, he was named acting county magistrate of Qi County, he became Communist Party Secretary in April 1994. He was vice-mayor of Hebi from January 2000 to March 2001 and vice-mayor of Anyang from March 2001 to November 2003. He became Deputy Communist Party Secretary of Zhoukou in November 2003, and then Communist Party Secretary, the top political position in the city, beginning in December 2011. During his time as Communist Party Secretary of Zhoukou, he led the Henan Grave Removal Project, which led to great controversy and fierce opposition from the local people.

== Downfall ==
He was elevated to vice-governor of Henan in January 2017, a position he held until August 2019, when he was placed under investigation by the Central Commission for Discipline Inspection (CCDI), the party's internal disciplinary body, and the National Supervisory Commission, the highest anti-corruption agency of China. As Governor, he focused on natural resources, housing, urban and rural construction, transportation and key projects. On February 21, 2020, he was expelled from the Chinese Communist Party (CCP) and dismissed from public office. On September 8, he stood trial at the Intermediate People's Court of Qingdao. He was charged of taking advantage of his various positions between 2004 and 2018 in Henan to seek benefits for relevant organizations and individuals in project contracting, business operations and job promotions. In return, he received money and gifts worth 12.65 million yuan (about 1.85 million U.S. dollars).

On January 11, 2021, he was sentenced to 11 years by the Qingdao Intermediate people's Court for consorting with some private enterprise owners and using his power and influence to seek benefits for them, and trading power for money. The court also confiscated one million yuan of his personal assets and ordered him to hand in money gained from bribes.

Government offices
Preceded by Gao Deling (高德领)	Mayor of Zhoukou; 2006–2011	Succeeded by Yue Wenhai
Party political offices
Preceded by Mao Chaofeng	Communist Party Secretary of Zhoukou; 2011–2017	Succeeded by Liu Jibiao (刘继标)
