= Xu Guangchun =

Chinese politician (1944–2022)

- 徐光春

Party Secretary of Henan
- In office 14 December 2004 – 30 November 2009
- Preceded by: Li Keqiang
- Succeeded by: Lu Zhangong

Director of the National Radio and Television Administration
- In office 28 June 2000 – 17 December 2004
- Premier: Zhu Rongji; Wen Jiabao
- Preceded by: Tian Congming
- Succeeded by: Wang Taihua

Personal details
- Born: November 1944 Shaoxing, Zhejiang, China
- Died: 21 October 2022 (aged 77) Zhengzhou, Henan, China
- Party: Chinese Communist Party

Chinese name
- Simplified Chinese: 徐光春
- Traditional Chinese: 徐光春
Transcriptions
Standard Mandarin
- Hanyu Pinyin: Xú Guāngchūn

Xu Guangchun (Chinese: 徐光春; pinyin: Xú Guāngchūn; November 1944 – 21 October 2022) was a Chinese politician who served as the Chinese Communist Party Committee Secretary of Henan province between 2004 and 2009.

== Biography ==
Xu Guangchun was born in Shaoxing, Zhejiang, China, in November 1944. Before he graduated from high school he went to work for the Hangzhou Daily newspaper as a reporter. He graduated from the Journalism Department of Renmin University of China in 1969 and joined the Chinese Communist Party in 1973. During this time he continued to work for local military publications, beginning in 1972 with the Anhui Production and Construction Corps, where he served as a reporter for the Corps Soldiers Newspaper. In 1975 he began a seven-year stint with Xinhua News Agency's Anhui bureau. Seven years later he joined the Chinese Photographers Association and later chaired the Anhui Photojournalist Society. He was named to head Xinhua's Shanghai bureau in 1985, and the Beijing bureau in 1988.

In 1984 he held his first public office. Xu became the Secretary of the Henan Provincial Committee of the Chinese Communist Party in 2004, and inherited a Henan bureaucracy that underwent restructuring under Li Keqiang. During his term, he largely continued on Li's general policy direction. Xu was a member of the 16th and 17th Central Committee of the Chinese Communist Party.

He has been chosen to host high-level foreign delegations, including an August 2009 visit to Zhengzhou by seven lieutenant governors from Arkansas, Idaho, Montana, Minnesota, Mississippi, North Dakota and Puerto Rico.

Xu was very active in journalist circles in China and has published a variety of books, including the Practical Manual for Amateur Photography, which was awarded the national Golden Key Award. He was married to Han Wufeng.

Xu left office as Chinese Communist Party Committee Secretary of Henan in 2009, after having reached the typical retirement age for provincial-level officials of 65. He went on to sit on the National People's Congress Financial and Economic Affairs Committee until 2013.

Government offices
Preceded by Tian Congming	Director of the National Radio and Television Administration; 2000-2004	Succeeded by Wang Taihua
Party political offices
Preceded by Li Keqiang	Secretary of the CPC Henan Committee; 2004–2009	Succeeded by Lu Zhangong
Preceded by Li Keqiang	Chairman of Henan People's Congress; 2005–2010	Succeeded by Lu Zhangong
