= Yue Wenhai =

Chinese politician (born 1958)

- 岳文海

Mayor of Zhoukou
- In office May 23, 2012 – May 2013
- Governor: Guo Gengmao
- Preceded by: Xu Guang
- Succeeded by: Liu Jibiao (刘继标)

Personal details
- Born: January 1958 (age 68) Tongbai County, Henan, China
- Party: Chinese Communist Party
- Education: Henan Agricultural University

Yue Wenhai (Chinese: 岳文海; pinyin: Yuè Wénhǎi; born January 1958) is a former Chinese official, he served as Mayor of Zhoukou from May 2012 to May 2013. He is now the Communist Party Secretary of China Minzu Securities.

== Biography ==
Yue Wenhai was born in Henan in 1958. In 1984, Yue Wenhai was admitted to the Henan Agricultural University, majoring in agricultural economics & management. After graduating from university in 1986, he became a civil servant. In 1995, he became the mayor of Xinzheng city. In 2012, he was transferred to Zhoukou city, as the mayor. In order to make new farmland, he launched the movement of dig graves, and he said: "It has no retreat, is a revolution, be an uphill battle." He also turned the old Zhengzhou Airport into the Zhengzhou New District. In May 2013, he resigned and became the party boss of China Minzu Securities.

== Investigation ==
On 1 February 2023, he was put under investigation for alleged "serious violations of laws" by the National Supervisory Commission, the highest anti-corruption agency of China.

== See also ==
- Henan Reinterment Project

Government offices
Preceded by Xu Guang	Mayor of Zhoukou; 2011 (acting)-2013	Succeeded by Liu Jibiao
