= Cao Jiongfang =

Chinese politician

- 曹炯芳

Secretary-General of the Standing Committee of Hunan Provincial People's Congress
- In office January 2022 – March 2022
- Chairman: Zhang Qingwei
- Preceded by: Hu Bojun
- Succeeded by: Wang Xiaoke

Chairman of the Standing Committee of Xiangtan Municipal People's Congress
- In office April 2016 – July 2021
- Preceded by: Chen Sanxin
- Succeeded by: Zhou Xiaoli

Communist Party Secretary of Xiangtan
- In office March 2016 – July 2021
- Deputy: Hu Weilin; Tan Wensheng; Zhang Yingchun (mayor)
- Preceded by: Chen Sanxin
- Succeeded by: Zhang Yingchun

Personal details
- Born: May 1964 (age 62) Li County, Hunan, China
- Party: Chinese Communist Party (1992–2022; expelled)
- Education: Xiangtan University

Cao Jiongfang (Chinese: 曹炯芳; pinyin: Cáo Jiǒngfāng; born May 1964) is a former Chinese politician who spent his entire career in central China's Hunan province. He was investigated by China's top anti-graft agency in March 2022. Previously he served as secretary-general of the Standing Committee of Hunan Provincial People's Congress and before that, party secretary of Xiangtan.

== Biography ==
Cao was born in Li County, Hunan, in May 1964. After resuming the college entrance examination in 1981, he was admitted to Xiangtan University, majoring in Marxism.

After graduating in 1988, he was assigned as an editor to Learning Guide, the organ newspaper of the Publicity Department of the CCP Hunan Provincial Committee. He joined the Chinese Communist Party (CCP) in May 1992. In August 1992, he was transferred to the General Office of the CCP Hunan Provincial Committee. In February 2004, he was appointed secretary-general of CCP Xiangtan Municipal Committee and was admitted to member of the standing committee of the CCP Xiangtan Municipal Committee, the city's top authority. In September 2006, he became head of its Organization Department. In September 2010, he became deputy director of the Research Office of Hunan Provincial People's Government, rising to director in April 2012. In May 2013, he took office as director of the Political Research Office of the CCP Hunan Provincial Committee. In March 2016, he was made party secretary of Xiangtan, concurrently serving as chairman of the Standing Committee of Xiangtan Municipal People's Congress since April of the same year. He served as deputy secretary-general of the Standing Committee of Hunan Provincial People's Congress in July 2021, and four months later promoted to the secretary-general position.

=== Downfall ===
On 3 March 2022, Cao was put under investigation for alleged "serious violations of discipline and laws" by the Central Commission for Discipline Inspection (CCDI), the party's internal disciplinary body, and the National Supervisory Commission, the highest anti-corruption agency of China. His predecessor Chen Sanxin was sacked for graft in May 2018. He was expelled from the CCP and removed from public office. On September 16, he was detained by the Supreme People's Procuratorate. On November 9, he was indicted on suspicion of accepting bribes and abuse of power.

On 16 May 2024, Cao was sentenced to 13 years in prison and fined 2 million yuan, and all illicit gains and interests will be turned over to the national treasury.

Party political offices
Preceded by Chen Sanxin	Communist Party Secretary of Xiangtan; 2016–2021	Succeeded by Zhang Yingchun
Assembly seats
Preceded by Chen Sanxin	Chairman of the Standing Committee of Xiangtan Municipal People's Congress; 2016–2021	Succeeded by Zhou Xiaoli (周晓理)
Preceded by Hu Bojun	Secretary-General of the Standing Committee of Hunan Provincial People's Congress; 2022	Succeeded by Wang Xiaoke
