= Battle of Luoyang (328–329) =

Later Zhao defeat of Former Zhao in China's Sixteen Kingdoms

- Part of Sixteen Kingdoms
Date	August or September 328 – 21 January 329
Location	Luoyang, Henan
Result	Later Zhao victory

Belligerents
Former Zhao	Later Zhao

Commanders and leaders
Liu Yao (POW)	Shi Le; Shi Sheng; Shi Hu

Strength
100,000+	87,000+

Casualties and losses
50,000+	Unknown

Battle of Luoyang
- Traditional Chinese: 洛陽之戰
- Simplified Chinese: 洛阳之战
Transcriptions
Standard Mandarin
- Hanyu Pinyin: Luòyáng zhī zhàn

The Battle of Luoyang was fought between the state of Later Zhao against the state of Former Zhao from August 328 to 21 January 329 during the Sixteen Kingdoms period in China. It concluded in a decisive victory for the Later Zhao and the capture of the Former Zhao emperor, Liu Yao, all but ensuring the Later Zhao's domination over northern China for the next 19 years.

== Background ==
In 319, after the defeat of Jin Zhun's rebellion, tension between the newly ascended Emperor of Han, Liu Yao and his general, Shi Le led to the split of the empire. Liu Yao had moved the capital west from Pingyang to his base in Chang'an the previous year, where he renamed the dynasty to Zhao. Following an incident where Liu Yao killed his envoys due to suspicion of rebellion, Shi Le declared independence in the east at Xiangguo by claiming the title of Prince of Zhao. In historiography, Liu Yao's state is referred to as the "Former Zhao", while Shi Le's state is known as the "Later Zhao".

At first, the confrontation between the two Zhao states was a standoff, as they concentrated their efforts in consolidating their respective territories. War did not begin until January or February 324, when Shi Le's adopted son, Shi Sheng killed Former Zhao's Administrator of Henan at Xin'an and captured more than 5,000 households. Since then, the two Zhaos constantly battled with one around the commanderies of Hedong and Hongnong.

As a general of Han, Liu Yao had previously sacked and burnt the Western Jin capital of Luoyang in 311, but the city remained contested with the Jin general, Li Ju attempting to recapture it. After the split, Shi Le laid claim on Luoyang but was resisted by Li Ju. In May or June 325, Shi Sheng camped at Luoyang and raided the Henan region. Low on supplies and with mounting defeats, Li Ju submitted to Liu Yao for reinforcements, but their combined forces were badly defeated and driven out by the Duke of Zhongshan, Shi Hu, who also captured the Former Zhao general, Liu Yue. Shi Le then placed Shi Sheng in command of Luoyang's defence.

== Prelude ==
=== Battle of Gaohou Plain ===
In August 328, Shi Hu, brought 40,000 soldiers from Zhi Pass (軹關; in present-day Jiyuan, Henan) to attack Former Zhao at Hedong Commandery in the west. He received the surrender of more than fifty counties before making his way to attack Puban (蒲坂; southwest of present-day Yongji, Shanxi).

In response, Liu Yao led an his elite army and navy 100,000 strong to rescue Puban, crossing north of the Yellow River from Wei Pass (衞關; in present-day Xinxiang, Henan). Shi Hu withdrew out of fear, and Liu Yao pursued him. On late August or September, he met Shi Hu in battle at Gaohou Plain (高候原; in present-day Wenxi County, Shanxi) and won a great victory. Many of Shi Hu's men were killed, including his adopted son, Shi Zhan while Liu Yao captured millions of his supplies and materials.

== The battle ==
=== Attack on Jinyong Fortress ===
As Shi Hu retreated to Zhaoge, Liu Yao crossed the Yellow River again at Dayang (大陽; in present-day Shanzhou, Henan) and attacked Jinyong Fortress (金墉城) to the northwest of Luoyang, where Shi Sheng was garrisoned. He burst the Qianjin Dam (千金堨; northwest of Luoyang) to flood the fortress while splitting up his forces to attack Ji (汲郡; around present-day Weihui, Henan) and Henei commanderies. The Administrator of Xingyang, Yin Ju (尹矩), the Administrator of Yewang, Zhang Jin (張進) and others from Later Zhao surrendered to Liu Yao, sending the Later Zhao court at Xiangguo into shock.

=== March to Xingyang ===
In November or December, Shi Le wanted to personally lead out troops to rescue Luoyang. Most of his court officials, including his brother-in-law, Cheng Xia warned him against this decision out of fear for his safety, but Shi Le drew his sword and shouted at them to leave. Then, Shi Le released his minister, Xu Guang, who he previously imprisoned for disorderly conduct, and asked for his opinion. Xu Guang assured his lord that he would win, pointing out that Liu Yao had mistakenly besieged Luoyang rather than going straight to Xiangguo, and Shi Le was pleased by his response. He also consulted the Buddhist monk, Fotu Cheng, who supported his plan and, in the only recorded instance of the Jie language, told him, "The army will go out and capture Bokkok!" (秀支替戾岡，僕穀劬禿當).

Thus, Shi Le began his preparations and issued a warning that anyone who opposes his decision will be executed. He ordered his adopted sons, Shi Kan and Shi Cong, the Inspector of Yu province, Tao Bao and others to link up at Xingyang. Shi Hu camped at Shimen (石門; near present-day Xingyang, Henan) while Shi Le led 40,000 soldiers towards Jinyong by crossing the Yellow River from Dajie (大堨; north of present-day Yanjin County, Henan). Initially, Shi Le was worried that Liu Yao would leave Luoyang to take up defence at Chenggao Pass for a strategic advantage. His worries dispelled when he arrived at Chenggao and discovered that there were no Former Zhao soldiers. He then pressed forward to Xingyang, passing between Gong and Zi (訾縣; around present-day Gongyi, Henan) counties.

=== Liu Yao's preparations ===
As Shi Le approached, Liu Yao spent his time leisurely by drinking and chatting with his close ministers, showing no care for his officers and soldiers. When reproached for his behaviour, Liu Yao took it as slander and had his critics executed. He only began to fortify his camps at Xingyang and garrisoned at Huangma Pass (黃馬關; near present-day Xingyang Henan) once he realized that Shi Le had crossed the Yellow River.

During a skirmish on the Luo river, a Jie soldier from the Later Zhao was captured. Liu Yao questioned this man on the size of Shi Le's army and changed expression after he was informed that Shi Le had come in person with a massive army. He lifted his siege on Jinyong and mounted a defence on the west side of the Luo River. When Shi Le arrived, he was pleased by what he saw, and he led 40,000 soldiers into Luoyang.

=== Capturing Liu Yao ===
On 21 January 329, Shi Hu brought 30,00 infantry to the west from the northern wall to attack Liu Yao's central army, while Shi Kan and Shi Cong each led 8,000 elite cavalry to the north from the western wall to fight the vanguard. A great battle ensured at Xiyang Gate (西陽門; on the southern part of Luoyang's western wall), and Shi Le, donning his armor, went out through the Changhe Gate (閶闔門; the northernmost gate of the western wall) to attack Liu Yao's flank.

According to records, Liu Yao was addicted to wine and would often drink large quantities of them before heading out to battle. He also usually rode his red horse, but at the time of the battle, the horse contracted a disease that affected its movements, so Liu Yao had to use a smaller horse. Just as he was about to ride out, Liu Yao drank more than a gallon of wine. When he arrived at Xiyang Gate, he signalled his army to recenter their formation. Shi Kan saw an opening and launched an attack, scattering the Zhao soldiers. Liu Yao attempted to flee in his drunken state, but his horse collapsed at a stone canal and he fell on the ice. He was stabbed more than ten times, with three of them piercing through his body, before he was finally captured by Shi Kan. The remaining Former Zhao soldiers were defeated by Shi Le, and more than 50,000 died in battle.

After Liu Yao's capture, Shi Le ordered everyone to cease fighting, claiming that Liu Yao had agreed to submit. Upon seeing Shi Le, Liu Yao said to him, "King Shi, do you remember our oath at Zhongmen?" Shi Le then sent Xu Guang to reply, "What happened today was simply the will of Heaven. What else there to say?"

== Aftermath ==
=== Death of Liu Yao ===
On 27 January, Shi Le returned to Xiangguo triumphant, but treated Liu Yao as an honoured prisoner. Liu Yao was escorted with troops, and because he was badly wounded from their battle, he was given a horse-drawn carriage with a doctor to nurse him. When they arrived on 10 February, Shi Le placed Liu Yao in a small fort at Yongfeng (永豐), where he was given women for his pleasure and kept under watch by guards.

Shi Le had all the captured Former Zhao generals to meet Liu Yao in fine clothes with their families. Liu Yao appeared pleased, praising Shi Le's magnanimity for treating his prisoners so well, and he and the prisoners feasted for an entire day. Afterwards, Shi Le requested Liu Yao to write a letter to Liu Xi, who still held Chang'an at this point, asking him and his followers to surrender. However, to Shi Le's anger, Liu Yao had instead sent a letter instructing his son to disregard his father's safety and prepare to defend himself. Shi Le soon had Liu Yao executed.

=== Massacre of the Liu clan ===
Liu Xi panicked when he received the message, and he and his brother, Liu Yin planned to retreat west to Qin province. The Master of Writing, Hu Xun (胡勳), warned them making a rash decision, but Liu Yin suspected him and had him executed. The brothers led their officials towards Shanggui, including the border commanders, throwing the whole of Guanzhong into disorder. Soon, defecting generals occupied Chang'an and surrendered the city to Shi Sheng.

In August or September, Liu Yin marched out from Shanggui to recapture Chang'an, and during the course of his march, he was joined by both Chinese and tribal people from various commanderies along the way. Shi Sheng held to his defenses while Shi Hu brought 20,000 cavalry to reinforce him. In September or August, Liu Yin's forces were badly defeated at Yiqu and retreated to Shanggui. Shi Hu pursued them and killed many of their soldiers along the way. He then captured Shanggui, massacring Liu Xi, Liu Yin and more than 3,000 Former Zhao nobles and officials.

Shi Hu then carried out a mass relocation of the population in the Guanzhong region, moving the Chinese, Qiang and Di people among others east to areas in and around Xiangguo. He took Liu Yao's daughter, the 12-year-old Princess of Anding, as his concubine and further massacred 5,000 members of the Chuge from the Five Divisions at Luoyang. The destruction of the Liu clan and the Former Zhao solidified the Later Zhao's hegemony over northern China. In 330, Shi Le claimed the imperial title of Emperor, and for the next two decade, his state would for the most part maintain a stalemate with the Eastern Jin to the south and its other surrounding states.

== Sources ==
- Dien, Albert E. (1986), "The Stirrup and Its Effect on Chinese Military History", Ars Orientalis, vol. 16, JSTOR, pp. 33–56
- Holcombe, Charles (2020), Dien, Albert E.; Knapp, Keith N. (eds.), "The Sixteen Kingdoms", The Cambridge History of China Volume 2: The Six Dynasties, Cambridge University Press, p. 127
- Vovin, Alexander; Vajda, Edward J; de la Vaissière, Etienne (2016), "Who Were The *Kjet (羯) and What Language Did They Speak?", Journal Asiatique, vol. 304, no. 1, Western Washington University, pp. 125–144
- Book of Jin
- Zizhi Tongjian
