= Shude =

Shude may refer to:

- Shude Village (樹德里), Luzhou District, New Taipei, Taiwan
- Shude Village (樹德里), Shulin District, New Taipei, Taiwan
- Shude Village (樹德里), South District, Taichung, Taiwan
- Emperor Gaozu of Tang (566–635), courtesy name Shude, the founding emperor of the Tang dynasty of China
- Ji Shude (姬叔德), a character in Chinese novel Investiture of the Gods
- Lee Sush-der (李述德; pinyin: Li Shùdé; born 1951), a Taiwanese politician
- Wu Shude (born 1959), a Chinese weightlifter
- Zhang Shude (1922–1988), a Chinese politician
- Lin Tie (1904–1989), born Liu Shude, a Communist revolutionary leader and politician of the People's Republic of China

== See also ==
- Shu-Te Home Economics & Commercial High School light rail station, a light rail station of Circular light rail, Kaohsiung, Taiwan
