= Chen Sanxin =

Chinese politician

- 陈三新

Chairman of Xiangtan People's Congress
- In office January 2015 – March 2016
- Preceded by: Yang Zuyao
- Succeeded by: Cao Jiongfang

Communist Party Secretary of Xiangtan
- In office January 2010 – March 2016
- Deputy: Yu Aiguo; Shi Yaobin; Hu Weilin (mayor)
- Preceded by: Peng Xianfa
- Succeeded by: Cao Jiongfang

Personal details
- Born: November 1957 (age 68) Yongzhou, Hunan, China
- Party: Chinese Communist Party (1985–2018; expelled)
- Education: China University of Geosciences, Wuhan

Chinese name
- Simplified Chinese: 陈三新
- Traditional Chinese: 陳三新
Transcriptions
Standard Mandarin
- Hanyu Pinyin: Chén Sānxīn

Chen Sanxin (Chinese: 陈三新; born November 1957) is a former Chinese politician who spent his entire career in his home-province Hunan. He was Chinese Communist Party Committee Secretary of Xiangtan between 2010 and 2016, and chairman of Xiangtan People's Congress between 2015 and 2016. He was investigated by China's top anti-graft agency in May 2018, and received a sentence of 11 years in prison and fine of 1.5 million yuan ($234,150) for corruption.

== Biography ==
Chen was born in Yongzhou, Hunan, in November 1957. He entered the workforce in 1981, and joined the Chinese Communist Party (CCP) in May 1985. He served in the Team 409 of Hunan Geological Bureau for a short while before entering Wuhan Institute of Geology (now China University of Geosciences, Wuhan) in 1983. After graduating in 1985, he continued to work in the Team 409 of Hunan Geological Bureau, where he was eventually promoted to its leader.

In August 1993, he became manager of Hunan Lingling Rock Foundation Engineering Company, concurrently serving as a party member of Hunan Provincial Geology and Mineral Resources Department and deputy director of Hunan Geology and Mineral Exploration and Development Bureau. In April 2000, he became deputy head of Hunan Provincial Natural Resources Department, rising to head in August 2006. In January 2010, he was transferred to Xiangtan and appointed CCP committee secretary, the top political position in the city, and concurrently holding the position of chairman of Xiangtan People's Congress since January 2015. In March 2016, he was assigned to the Hunan Provincial Committee of the Chinese People's Political Consultative Conference, where he was appointed deputy secretary-general, and served until May 2018, when he was placed under investigation for "serious violations of laws and regulations".

=== Downfall ===
On 11 May 2018, he was put under investigation for alleged "serious violations of discipline and laws" by the Central Commission for Discipline Inspection (CCDI), the CCP's internal disciplinary body, and the National Supervisory Commission, the highest anti-corruption agency of China. He was detained by the Hunan Provincial People's Procuratorate in August. On August 17, he was expelled from the CCP and dismissed from public office. On August 27, he was indicted on suspicion of accepting bribes. On October 31, he stood trial at the Intermediate People's Court of Zhuzhou on charges of taking bribes. He was charged with accepting money and property worth over 9.77 million yuan ($1.525 million) personally or through his family members. According to the indictment, he allegedly took advantage of his positions to seek benefits for others in examination and approval of qualification, contracting of engineering projects and payment of engineering funds between 2003 and 2017. On December 21, he was sentenced to 11 years and fined 1.5 million yuan ($234,150) for taking bribes. All his illegal gains will be confiscated and handed over to the State.

Government offices
Preceded by Ge Hongyuan	Head of Hunan Provincial Natural Resources Department; 2006–2010	Succeeded by Fang Xianzhi
Party political offices
Preceded by Peng Xianfa	Communist Party Secretary of Xiangtan; 2010–2016	Succeeded by Cao Jiongfang
Assembly seats
Preceded by Yang Zuyao	Chairman of Xiangtan People's Congress; 2015–2016	Succeeded by Cao Jiongfang
