= Henan Grave Removal Project =

Henan Reinterment Project
- Date: 2012–2013
- Location: Henan Province
- Participants: CPC Henan Provincial Committee

The Henan Grave Removal Project (simplified Chinese: 河南平坟运动; traditional Chinese: 河南平墳運動; pinyin: Hénán Píngfén Yùndòng), carried out in Henan Province, China, between 2012 and 2013, was a proposed by Henan CPC Secretary Lu Zhangong. The purpose of the exercise was to reclaim land for farming, mainly in Nanyang, Luoyang, Shangqiu and Zhoukou. The government of Henan Province announced that it had levelled more than two million graves to create fields covering 30,000 mu (~18.43 km^{2}). After media reports caused great controversy, supporters commented that it was a worthwhile project, while opponents said it was "a foul action."

== Cultural background ==
According to Chinese tradition, dead ancestors are honored each year during the Qingming festival as a display of Confucian "filial piety".

== Implementation ==
In the spring of 2012, while inspecting the city of Nanyang, Henan Provincial CPC Committee Secretary Lu Zhangong observed many graves scattered across farmland. As a result, he issued instructions that launched a project to remove the graves. Zhao Keluo put forth a motion at the Chinese People's Political Consultative Conference (CPPCC) objecting to the digging up of graves and demanded the work be stopped. However, the secretary of Henan province Shi Jichun criticized him as this "caused serious negative impact". On July 31, Lu Zhangong issued documented instructions:

Given our responsibilities to the people and the future, what are we to do? This project involves the scientific concepts of development and we have to face up to the problem. According to the Provincial Party Committee Work Report, party committees at all levels, government employees and relevant government departments should give serious consideration to what we are to do.

Grave levelling activity began, and spread from Zhoukou city to the rest of Henan province. In Shangshui County, Fugou County, Xiangcheng City and other locations, school hours were curtailed in support of the project and a speech contest held. Ancestral graves of government officials were designated protected by cemetery and cultural relics protection units. Villagers were instructed to dig out graves and received 200 yuan per site while village officials were instructed to take the lead or be removed. Teachers were instructed to take the lead or face suspension while members of the CPC were instructed to act as project leaders or their memberships would be cancelled. Three months later, all the graves had been dug out in Zhoukou city. A "work plan" regulation held that those leaving a grave intact would be fined 1000 yuan. On May 15, at a municipal party committee meeting, Zhoukou city mayor Yue Wenhai said:

There can be no backtracking, this is a revolution and an uphill battle.

The next month, he went on to say: "Carry out Luo Zhangong's instructions" to actively promote reform of the funeral system. Four months later, the Zhoukou city municipal party committee held a meeting, which involved the Henan provincial party committee secretary Lu Zhangong, Henan provincial governor Guo Gengmao, the ministry of civil affairs minister Li Liguo and other provincial leaders. In November, vice governor of Henan province Wang Tiexiang gave Zhoukou city a three million yuan budget bonus. On November 14, Zhoukou city mayor Yue Wenhai said during an inspection of Taikang County that:

County, township and village cadres at various levels, should adopt innovative work methods, and conscientiously carry out relevant policy and guidance work to promote reform of the funeral system and work safely."

On December 25, Zhao Keluo published a note stating that if Henan provincial party committee officials continued to retaliate, he was ready to commit suicide to achieve his goals.

In 2013, the State Council of the People's Republic of China ordered that people should not be forced to remove graves. As a result, one million graves in Zhoukou city have been restored. On February 21, 2013, Henan Daily published an article claiming "many individuals have used the Internet to issue false news, confuse right and wrong, and incite people against national policy."

== See also ==
- Yue Wenhai
- Lu Zhangong
