= Gan Rongkun =

Chinese politician

- 甘荣坤

Secretary of the Henan Provincial Politics and Law Commission
- In office October 2019 – June 2021
- Preceded by: Yu Hongqiu
- Succeeded by: Zhou Ji

Secretary of the Henan Provincial Politics and Law Commission
- In office July 2016 – September 2019
- Preceded by: Yang Dongqi
- Succeeded by: Zhang Anshun

Director of the Beijing Customs
- In office September 2007 – August 2013
- Preceded by: Li Qingzhu
- Succeeded by: Gao Rongkun

Personal details
- Born: May 1962 (age 64) Pengze County, Jiangxi, China
- Party: Chinese Communist Party (1996–2021; expelled)
- Education: Jiangxi University of Finance and Economics

Chinese name
- Simplified Chinese: 甘荣坤
- Traditional Chinese: 甘榮坤
Transcriptions
Standard Mandarin
- Hanyu Pinyin: Gān Róngkūn

Gan Rongkun (Chinese: 甘荣坤; born May 1962) is a former Chinese politician. He was investigated by China's top anti-graft agency in June 2021. He entered the workforce in July 1983, and joined the Chinese Communist Party (CCP) in April 1996. Previously he was secretary of the Henan Provincial Politics and Law Commission and a member of the Standing Committee of the CCP Henan Provincial Committee.

== Career ==
Gan was born in Pengze County, Jiangxi, in May 1962. After the resumption of college entrance examination, he entered Jiangxi University of Finance and Economics in 1979, where he majored in finance and accounting. After graduating in 1983, he was dispatched to the China Earthquake Administration. Beginning in April 1989, he served in several posts in the General Administration of Customs, including economist, deputy section chief, and section chief. He was director of the Beijing Customs in September 2007, and held that office until July 2013. In August 2013, he was transferred to central China's Hubei province and appointed vice governor. In July 2016, he was transferred to northeast China's Heilongjiang province and became a member of the Standing Committee of the CPC Heilongjiang Provincial Committee, concurrently holding the secretary of the Heilongjiang Provincial Politics and Law Commission position. He was assigned to the similar position in north China's Henan province in September 2019.

== Downfall ==
On June 1, 2021, he was put under investigation for alleged "serious violations of discipline and laws" by the Central Commission for Discipline Inspection (CCDI), the party's internal disciplinary body, and the National Supervisory Commission, the highest anti-corruption agency of China. On December 1, he was expelled from the CCP and dismissed from public office. He was detained by the Supreme People's Procuratorate on December 20.

On December 27, 2023, he was sentenced to life imprisonment for bribery in 166 million yuan.

Government offices
Preceded by Li Qingzhu	Director of the Beijing Customs; 2007–2013	Succeeded by Gao Rongkun
Party political offices
Preceded by Yang Dongqi	Secretary of the Heilongjiang Provincial Politics and Law Commission; 2016–2019	Succeeded by Zhang Anshun
Preceded by Yu Hongqiu	Secretary of the Henan Provincial Politics and Law Commission; 2019–2021	Succeeded by Zhou Ji
