= Governor of Henan =

Governor of the Henan Provincial People's Government
- 河南省人民政府省长
- National Emblem of China

- Flag of China
- Incumbent; Wang Lujin; Acting since 24 September 2026
- Henan Provincial People's Government
- Type: Governor
- Status: Provincial and ministerial-level official
- Reports to: Henan Provincial People's Congress and its Standing Committee
- Nominator: Presidium of the Henan Provincial People's Congress
- Appointer: Henan Provincial People's Congress
- Term length: Five years, renewable
- Inaugural holder: Wu Zhipu
- Formation: May 1949
- Deputy: Deputy Governors; Secretary-General

The governor of Henan, officially the Governor of the Henan Provincial People's Government, is the head of Henan Province and leader of the Henan Provincial People's Government.

The governor is elected by the Henan Provincial People's Congress, and responsible to it and its Standing Committee. The governor is a provincial level official and is responsible for the overall decision-making of the provincial government. The governor is assisted by an executive vice governor as well as several vice governors. The governor generally serves as the deputy secretary of the Henan Provincial Committee of the Chinese Communist Party and as a member of the CCP Central Committee. The governor is the second highest-ranking official in the province after the secretary of the CCP Henan Committee. The current acting governor is Wang Lujin, who took office on 24 September 2026.

== List of governors ==
=== People's Republic of China ===
No.	Officeholder	Term of office		Party	Ref.
No.	Officeholder	Took office	Left office	Party	Ref.
Governor of the Henan Provincial People's Government
1	Wu Zhipu (1906–1967)	May 1949	January 1955	Chinese Communist Party	
Governor of the Henan Provincial People's Committee
(1)	Wu Zhipu (1906–1967)	January 1955	July 1962	Chinese Communist Party	
2	Wen Minsheng (1915–1997)	July 1962	January 1968	Chinese Communist Party	
Director of the Henan Revolutionary Committee
3	Liu Jianxun (1913–1983)	January 1968	October 1978	Chinese Communist Party	
4	Duan Junyi (1910–2004)	October 1978	September 1979	Chinese Communist Party	
Governor of the Henan Provincial People's Government
5	Liu Jie (1915–2018)	September 1979	December 1981	Chinese Communist Party	
6	Yu Mingtao (1917–2017)	December 1981	December 1982	Chinese Communist Party	
7	Dai Suli (1919–2000)	December 1982	March 1983	Chinese Communist Party	
8	He Zhukang (born 1932)	March 1983	July 1987	Chinese Communist Party	
9	Cheng Weigao (1933–2010)	July 1987	July 1990	Chinese Communist Party	
10	Li Changchun (born 1944)	July 1990	December 1992	Chinese Communist Party	
11	Ma Zhongchen (1936–2021)	December 1992	July 1998	Chinese Communist Party	
12	Li Keqiang (1955–2023)	24 July 1998	18 January 2003	Chinese Communist Party	
13	Li Chengyu (born 1946)	18 January 2003	8 April 2008	Chinese Communist Party	
14	Guo Gengmao (born 1950)	8 April 2008	27 March 2013	Chinese Communist Party	
15	Xie Fuzhan (born 1954)	2 April 2013	5 April 2016	Chinese Communist Party	
16	Chen Run'er (born 1957)	7 April 2016	6 December 2019	Chinese Communist Party	
17	Yin Hong (born 1963)	6 December 2019	2 April 2021	Chinese Communist Party	
18	Wang Kai (born 1962)	2 April 2021	24 September 2026	Chinese Communist Party	
19	Wang Lujin (born 1968); Acting	24 September 2026	Incumbent	Chinese Communist Party	
