= Chen Kuiyuan =

Chinese politician (born 1941)

- 陈奎元
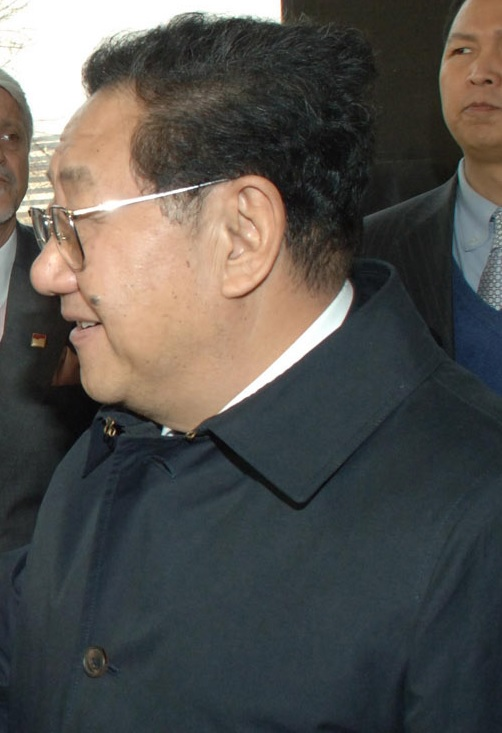
- Chen Kuiyuan

Party Secretary of Henan
- In office October 2000 – December 2002
- Preceded by: Ma Zhongchen
- Succeeded by: Li Keqiang

Party Secretary of Tibet
- In office 1 December 1992 – 16 October 2000
- Preceded by: Hu Jintao
- Succeeded by: Guo Jinlong

Personal details
- Born: January 1941 (age 85) Kangping, Liaoning Province
- Party: Chinese Communist Party
- Education: Inner Mongolia Normal College

Chinese name
- Simplified Chinese: 陈奎元
- Traditional Chinese: 陳奎元
Transcriptions
Standard Mandarin
- Hanyu Pinyin: Chén Kuíyuán

Chen Kuiyuan (simplified Chinese: 陈奎元; traditional Chinese: 陳奎元; pinyin: Chén Kuíyuán; born January 1941) is a former Chinese politician. In a lengthy public career, Chen served variously as the vice chairman of Chinese People's Political Consultative Conference (CPPCC), the president and the Chinese Communist Party Committee Secretary of the Chinese Academy of Social Sciences, and CCP Committee Secretary of the Tibet Autonomous Region and Henan. He retired in 2013.

== Career ==
=== Inner Mongolia ===
Born in Kangping, Liaoning Province, Chen graduated from Inner Mongolia Normal College, majoring in political education. He joined the Chinese Communist Party (CCP) in May 1965. After graduation in 1964, Chen was assigned to work in the CCP party school in Hulunbuir of Inner Mongolia Autonomous Region. He later served in various posts in Hulunbuir and eventually became the Party chief of local CCP committee. In 1989, Chen became a standing member of CCP Inner Mongolia committee, and the secretary of commission for higher institutions of the autonomous region. In 1991, he was elevated to the vice chairman of Inner Mongolia Autonomous Region.

=== Tibet ===
In January 1992, Chen was transferred to Tibet Autonomous Region and became the deputy secretary of Tibet Autonomous Regional Committee of the Chinese Communist Party. In November of that year, Chen succeeded Hu Jintao as the secretary of CCP Tibet Committee, essentially the top official of Tibet.

=== Henan ===
In 2000, he was transferred to Henan Provincial Committee of the Chinese Communist Party as party secretary. In December 2002, the Central Committee of the Chinese Communist Party decided to appoint Li Keqiang to replace Chen as Secretary of the Henan Provincial Party Committee.

=== Beijing ===
In January 2003, he moved up to the central government to become president and party secretary of the Chinese Academy of Social Sciences (CASS). In March 2003, at the first session of the 10th National Committee of the Chinese People's Political Consultative Conference (CPPCC), Chen Kuiyuan was elected vice-chairman of the 10th CPPCC, and was reelected in March 2008; in April 2013, he stepped down as president and secretary of the CPC Central Committee of the Chinese Academy of Social Sciences, and was succeeded by Wang Weiguang.

Chen was a member of the 14th, 15th, 16th, and 17th Central Committee of the Chinese Communist Party.

Party political offices
Preceded by Hu Jintao	Party Secretary of Tibet; 1992–2000	Succeeded by Guo Jinlong
Preceded by Ma Zhongchen	Party Secretary of Henan; October 2000 – December 2002	Succeeded by Li Keqiang
Academic offices
Preceded by Li Tieying	President of the Chinese Academy of Social Sciences; 2003–2013	Succeeded by Wang Weiguang
