= Party Secretary of Henan =

Provincial government position in China

Secretary of the Henan Provincial Committee of the Chinese Communist Party
- 中国共产党河南省委员会书记
- Emblem of the Chinese Communist Party

- Flag of the Chinese Communist Party

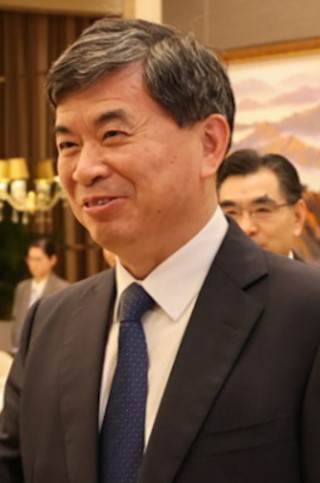
- Incumbent; Zhou Zuyi since 23 September 2026
- Henan Provincial Committee of the Chinese Communist Party
- Type: Party Committee Secretary
- Status: Provincial and ministerial-level official
- Nominator: Central Committee
- Appointer: Henan Provincial Committee Central Committee
- Inaugural holder: Zhang Xi
- Formation: October 1949
- Deputy: Deputy Secretary; Secretary-General

The secretary of the Henan Provincial Committee of the Chinese Communist Party is the leader of the Henan Provincial Committee of the Chinese Communist Party (CCP). As the CCP is the sole ruling party of the People's Republic of China (PRC), the secretary is the highest ranking post in Henan.

The secretary is officially appointed by the CCP Central Committee based on the recommendation of the CCP Organization Department, which is then approved by the Politburo and its Standing Committee. The secretary can be also appointed by a plenary meeting of the Henan Provincial Committee, but the candidate must be the same as the one approved by the central government. The secretary leads the Standing Committee of the Henan Provincial Committee, and is usually a member of the CCP Central Committee. The secretary leads the work of the Provincial Committee and its Standing Committee. The secretary is outranks the governor, who is generally the deputy secretary of the committee.

The current secretary is Zhou Zuyi, who took office on 23 September 2026.

== List of party secretaries ==
No.	Image	Name	Term start	Term end	Ref.
1		Zhang Xi (1912–1959)	October 1949	November 1952	
2		Pan Fusheng (1908–1980)	November 1952	August 1958	
3		Wu Zhipu (1906–1967)	August 1958	July 1961	
4		Liu Jianxun (1913–1983)	July 1961	October 1978	
5		Duan Junyi (1910–2004)	October 1978	January 1981	
6		Liu Jie (1915–2018)	January 1981	May 1985	
7		Yang Xizong (1928–2007)	May 1985	March 1990	
8		Hou Zongbin (1929–2017)	March 1990	December 1992	
9		Li Changchun (born 1944)	December 1992	February 1998	
10		Ma Zhongchen (born 1936)	February 1998	October 2000	
11		Chen Kuiyuan (born 1941)	October 2000	December 2002	
12		Li Keqiang (1955–2023)	29 December 2002	14 December 2004	
13		Xu Guangchun (1944–2022)	14 December 2004	30 November 2009	
14		Lu Zhangong (born 1952)	30 November 2009	March 2013	
15		Guo Gengmao (born 1950)	March 2013	26 March 2016	
16		Xie Fuzhan (born 1954)	26 March 2016	21 March 2018	
17		Wang Guosheng (born 1956)	21 March 2018	1 June 2021	
18		Lou Yangsheng (born 1959)	1 June 2021	31 December 2024	
19		Liu Ning (born 1962)	31 December 2024	23 September 2026	
20		Zhou Zuyi (born 1965)	23 September 2026	Incumbent	
