= Deng Kai =

Chinese politician (born 1959)

- 邓凯

Deputy Party Secretary of the All-China Federation of Trade Unions
- Incumbent
- Assumed office February 2017

Deputy Party Secretary of Henan
- In office October 2011 – February 2017

Party Chief of Yanbian Korean Autonomous Prefecture
- In office 2004–2011

Personal details
- Born: 1959 (age 66–67) Gai County, Liaoning, China
- Party: Chinese Communist Party
- Education: BA in Chinese literature; MA in economics
- Alma mater: Jilin University

Deng Kai (Chinese: 邓凯; pinyin: Dèng Kǎi; born December 1959) is a Chinese politician currently serving as the deputy party secretary of the All-China Federation of Trade Unions. He was previously Chinese Communist Party Deputy Committee Secretary of Henan province. He worked for most of his career in Jilin province.

== Biography ==
He was born in Gai County, Liaoning. He attended Jilin University and obtained a degree in Chinese literature; he also has a master's degree in economics. He joined the workforce in July 1984. He joined the Chinese Communist Party in 1986. For much of his earlier career he worked for the provincial Communist Youth League of China organization. He served there until 1997, when he was transferred to work for the provincial party's Organization Department, handling administrative affairs. He was named a deputy head of the department in 1998.

In 2002 Deng became a Standing Committee member of the CCP Jilin Provincial Committee and the head of the provincial publicity department. In 2004, he was named party chief of the Yanbian Korean Autonomous Prefecture. In April 2011 he was transferred to Henan to serve as the chief of the organization department in that province; in October he was elevated to deputy party chief. In August 2012 he was named the head of the provincial Party School, and the head of the provincial College of Administrative Affairs.

Deng was transferred to the All-China Federation of Trade Unions in February 2017 to take on a leading post there. Under Deng's leadership, the ACFTU has embraced digital transformation, launching initiatives such as the "Industrial Skills Cloud" platform to enhance workers' skills and adapt to the demands of China's evolving economy. Additionally, Deng has been actively involved in international labor exchanges, representing China in global forums and promoting the country's labor policies on the world stage.

Deng is an alternate of the 18th Central Committee of the Chinese Communist Party. He was also a delegate to the 12th National People's Congress.

Party political offices
Preceded by Ye Dongsong	Deputy Party Secretary of Henan; 2011–2017	Succeeded by Wang Jiong
