= Wang Guosheng (politician) =

Chinese politician and senior regional official

- 王国生
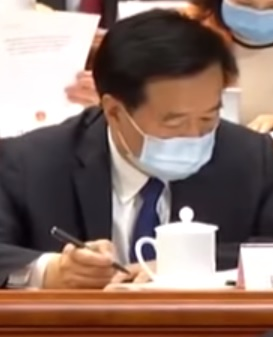

Party Secretary of Henan
- In office 21 March 2018 – 1 June 2021
- Deputy: Chen Run'er (governor); Yin Hong; Wang Kai
- Preceded by: Xie Fuzhan
- Succeeded by: Lou Yangsheng

Party Secretary of Qinghai
- In office 29 June 2016 – 21 March 2018
- Deputy: Hao Peng (governor); Wang Jianjun
- Preceded by: Luo Huining
- Succeeded by: Wang Jianjun

Governor of Hubei
- In office 26 December 2010 – 28 June 2016
- Party Secretary: Li Hongzhong
- Preceded by: Li Hongzhong
- Succeeded by: Wang Xiaodong

Personal details
- Born: May 1956 (age 70) Dong'e County, Shandong, China
- Party: Chinese Communist Party
- Education: Shandong University

Wang Guosheng (Chinese: 王国生; born May 1956) is a Chinese politician and senior regional official, serving as the Party Secretary of Henan province from 2018 to 2021. Previously, he served as Governor of Hubei province, and the Party Secretary of Qinghai.

== Career ==
Wang was born in Dong'e County, Shandong province. Wang Guosheng joined the Chinese Communist Party in June 1975. At that time, he was working as a rusticated youth performing labour at the Daqiao Commune, where he led the local Communist Youth League group.

From 1981 to 1983 Wang attended Shandong University, studying political science; he also obtained a graduate degree from the Central Party School. From October 1991 to February 1995 he was the Party Secretary of Gaotang County, Shandong. From February 1995 to December 1997 he was the deputy party chief of Liaocheng prefecture. Then he became deputy head of the provincial department of labour. In August 2000 he became the Communist Party Chief of Lianyungang city in neighbouring Jiangsu province. He ascended to sub-provincial ranks as part of the Jiangsu provincial party standing committee at the age of 45, then named head of the Jiangsu Publicity Department in 2001, then head of the organization department in 2004. He was promoted to the position of deputy party chief of Jiangsu in April 2008.

In December 2010 Wang was transferred to Hubei province, where he held the positions of deputy provincial party chief, vice governor, and acting governor. In February 2011 he became the governor of Hubei. During his term in Hubei, he developed a low-key reputation. Once he was touring Wuhan with the mayor Tang Liangzhi; some locals recognized the mayor but not the governor. Wang said to Tang, "see, you are much more famous than me!" He also reportedly became stuck in a traffic jam with an agricultural truck driver and voluntarily moved out of the way so that the truck could pass through. This received media attention because officials were generally seen as feeling entitled to right of way. Wang's 2015 government work report received praise for the plain language used and attention to the issues of ordinary people.

In June 2016, he was transferred across the country to Qinghai province to serve as party chief. Later he was transferred to Henan to serve as party chief in March 2018.

In June 2021, Wang was appointed as the Deputy Chairperson of the National People's Congress Social Development Affairs Committee.

Wang was an alternate of the 17th Central Committee of the Chinese Communist Party, and has been a full member of the 18th and 19th Central Committees.

Party political offices
Preceded by Xie Fuzhan	Party Secretary of Henan; 2018–2021	Succeeded by Lou Yangsheng
Preceded by Luo Huining	Party Secretary of Qinghai; 2016–2018	Succeeded by Wang Jianjun
Government offices
Preceded by Li Hongzhong	Governor of Hubei; 2010–2016	Succeeded by Wang Xiaodong
