= Li Chengyu =

Chinese politician

Li Chengyu (Chinese: 李成玉; pinyin: Lǐ Chéngyù, born August 1946) is a Chinese politician. He served as the governor of Henan between 2003 and 2008, and president of All China Federation of Supply and Marketing Cooperatives between 2008 and 2011.

== Biography ==
Li Chengyu was born in Haiyuan County, Ningxia in 1946. He joined the Chinese Communist Party in 1971. In 1978, he became head of the Communist Youth League in Ningxia. In 1985 he became the commissioner of the Yinnan Prefecture (mayor equivalent). Between 1988 and 1992 he served as Vice-Chairman of Ningxia.

In 1992, he was transferred to Henan to serve as Vice Governor of that province. In 1995 he earned a seat on the standing committee of the Henan Provincial Committee of the Chinese Communist Party. In January 2003 Li was named Chinese Communist Party Deputy Committee Secretary of Henan.

Li served as the Governor of Henan from 2003 to 2008. In 2008 he became president of the All China Federation of Supply and Marketing Cooperatives. He left office after having reached age 65, the typical retirement age for provincial-level officials. He went on to sit on the National People's Congress Agriculture and Rural Affairs Committee until 2013. In 2013, he became a member of the Standing Committee of the Chinese People's Political Consultative Conference, and a member of its population and environment committee.

He was the alternate of the 16th Central Committee of the Chinese Communist Party and a member of the 17th Central Committee.

Political offices
| Preceded by Li Keqiang | Governor of Henan; 2003–2008 | Succeeded by Guo Gengmao |
