= Zhao Wenfu =

Chinese politician

Zhao Wenfu (Chinese: 赵文甫) (1913–1990) was a Chinese politician. He was born in Xin'an County, Luoyang, Henan Province. He was the 3rd Chairman of the People's Standing Congress of Henan. He was a delegate to the 1st National People's Congress, 2nd National People's Congress, 3rd National People's Congress, 5th National People's Congress, 6th National People's Congress and 7th National People's Congress.

Preceded by Liu Jie	Chairman of the People's Standing Congress of Henan	Succeeded by Zhang Shude
Preceded by Liu Jianxun	CPPCC Chairman of Henan	Succeeded by Wang Huayun
