= Wang Lujin =

Chinese politician

- 王陆进

Governor of Henan
- Acting
- Assumed office 23 September 2026
- Party Secretary: Zhou Zuyi
- Preceded by: Wang Kai

Head of the Political and Legal Affairs Commission of the Hebei Provincial Committee of the Chinese Communist Party
- In office February 2026 – September 2026
- Party Secretary: Ni Yuefeng; Luo Wen
- Preceded by: Dong Xiaoyu
- Succeeded by: Vacant

Executive Deputy Party Secretary of the Hebei Provincial Committee of the Chinese Communist Party
- In office June 2024 – September 2026
- Party Secretary: Ni Yuefeng; Luo Wen
- Preceded by: Lian Yimin
- Succeeded by: Chang Bin

Personal details
- Born: October 1968 (age 58) Danyang, Jiangsu, China
- Party: Chinese Communist Party (1995-)
- Education: Changzhou Machinery School; Zhongnan University of Economics; Xiamen University

Wang Lujin (Chinese: 王陆进; born October 1968) is a Chinese politician, currently serving as the deputy secretary of the Henan Provincial Committee of the Chinese Communist Party and the governor of Henan since September 2026. Previously he was served as the executive deputy party secretary and the head of the political and legal affairs commission of the Hebei Provincial Committee of the Chinese Communist Party. He is a delegate to the 20th National Congress of the Chinese Communist Party.

== Career ==
Wang was born in Danyang, Jiangsu in October 1968. He was enrolled to Changzhou Machinery School in 1983, and graduated in 1987. In 1987, he was enrolled to Zhongnan University of Economics. Wang was graduated and served as a teacher in 1990, and left the university in 1995. In the meanwhile, he was enrolled to Xiamen University in 1992, and graduated in 1995.

Wang was enrolled to the State Taxation Administration in 1995, which worked in the department of policies and regulations, the audit department and the office. In 2013, he was appointed as the director of the office of the STA, and appointed as the chief accountant in 2016. He was appointed as the deputy director of the STA in 2018.

In August 2020, Wang was appointed as the deputy auditor-general of the National Audit Office.

In October 2022, Wang was appointed as head of the discipline inspection and supervision group stationed at the China Banking and Insurance Regulatory Commission by the Central Commission for Discipline Inspection and the National Supervisory Commission. The CBIRC was reorganization as the National Financial Regulatory Administration in May 2023.

In June 2024, Wang was appointed as the executive deputy party secretary of the Hebei Provincial Committee of the Chinese Communist Party. He was appointed as the head of the political and legal affairs commission in February 2026.

In September 2026, Wang was appointed as the deputy secretary of the Henan Provincial Committee of the Chinese Communist Party and the acting governor of Henan.

Government offices
Preceded by Wang Kai	Governor of Henan; 2026–	Incumbent
Party political offices
Preceded by Dong Xiaoyu	Head of the Political and Legal Affairs Commission of the Hebei Provincial Committee of the Chinese Communist Party; 2026	Vacant
Preceded by Lian Yimin	Executive Deputy Party Secretary of the Hebei Provincial Committee of the Chinese Communist Party; 2024–2026	Succeeded by Chang Bin
