= Taiqian County =

Coordinates: 35°59′49″N 115°51′24″E

Taiqian County 台前县
- County
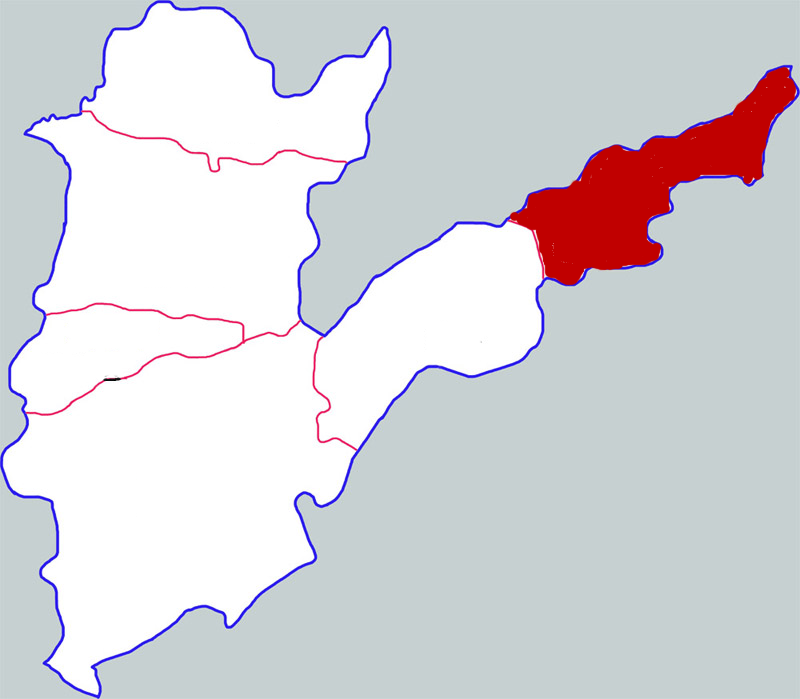
- Taiqian in Puyang

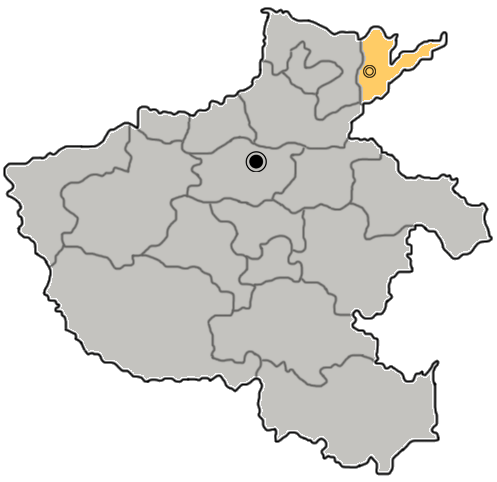
- Puyang in Henan
- Country: People's Republic of China
- Province: Henan
- Prefecture-level city: Puyang

Area
  - Total: 454 km^{2} (175 sq mi)

Population (2019)
  - Total: 330,400
  - Density: 728/km^{2} (1,880/sq mi)
- Time zone: UTC+8 (China Standard)
- Postal code: 457600

Taiqian County (Chinese: 台前县; pinyin: Táiqián Xiàn) is a county in the northeast of Henan province, China, bordering Henan's Fan County to the southwest and Shandong province in all other directions. It is under the administration of the prefecture-level city of Puyang, and generally lies on the north bank of the Yellow River.

== Administrative divisions ==
As of 2012, this county is divided to 2 towns and 7 townships.

Towns

- Chengguan (城关镇)
- Houmiao (侯庙镇)

Townships

- Houfang Township (后方乡)
- Qingshuihe Township (清水河乡)
- Malou Township (马楼乡)
- Sunkou Township (孙口乡)
- Dayuchen Township (打渔陈乡)
- Jiahe Township (夹河乡)
- Wuba Township (吴坝乡)

== Climate ==
Climate data for Taiqian, elevation 42 m (138 ft), (1991–2020 normals, extremes 1981–2010)
Month	Jan	Feb	Mar	Apr	May	Jun	Jul	Aug	Sep	Oct	Nov	Dec	Year
Record high °C (°F)	16.0 (60.8)	23.6 (74.5)	28.0 (82.4)	33.8 (92.8)	36.5 (97.7)	41.8 (107.2)	40.4 (104.7)	36.5 (97.7)	35.7 (96.3)	33.4 (92.1)	25.8 (78.4)	20.2 (68.4)	41.8 (107.2)
Mean daily maximum °C (°F)	4.2 (39.6)	8.2 (46.8)	14.5 (58.1)	20.8 (69.4)	26.3 (79.3)	31.7 (89.1)	31.9 (89.4)	30.3 (86.5)	27.0 (80.6)	21.2 (70.2)	12.8 (55.0)	5.9 (42.6)	19.6 (67.2)
Daily mean °C (°F)	−1.2 (29.8)	2.3 (36.1)	8.4 (47.1)	14.8 (58.6)	20.4 (68.7)	25.6 (78.1)	27.1 (80.8)	25.6 (78.1)	21.0 (69.8)	15.0 (59.0)	7.1 (44.8)	0.7 (33.3)	13.9 (57.0)
Mean daily minimum °C (°F)	−5.1 (22.8)	−2.1 (28.2)	3.3 (37.9)	9.3 (48.7)	14.8 (58.6)	20.1 (68.2)	23.2 (73.8)	22.0 (71.6)	16.6 (61.9)	10.2 (50.4)	2.7 (36.9)	−3.1 (26.4)	9.3 (48.8)
Record low °C (°F)	−19.6 (−3.3)	−16.6 (2.1)	−8.7 (16.3)	−3.5 (25.7)	2.7 (36.9)	10.5 (50.9)	16.9 (62.4)	12.1 (53.8)	4.1 (39.4)	−2.2 (28.0)	−14.0 (6.8)	−15.7 (3.7)	−19.6 (−3.3)
Average precipitation mm (inches)	4.5 (0.18)	9.2 (0.36)	12.8 (0.50)	33.8 (1.33)	53.6 (2.11)	64.3 (2.53)	143.6 (5.65)	135.1 (5.32)	51.4 (2.02)	30.0 (1.18)	23.8 (0.94)	6.8 (0.27)	568.9 (22.39)
Average precipitation days (≥ 0.1 mm)	2.5	3.5	3.4	4.8	6.1	7.4	10.6	9.6	6.3	5.0	4.7	2.6	66.5
Average snowy days	2.7	2.7	0.8	0.2	0	0	0	0	0	0	0.9	2.1	9.4
Average relative humidity (%)	65	62	59	65	69	65	80	85	79	71	71	68	70
Mean monthly sunshine hours	150.8	154.5	205.0	225.1	249.8	225.9	196.3	196.9	190.7	184.4	153.0	147.2	2,279.6
Percentage possible sunshine	48	50	55	57	57	52	45	48	52	53	50	49	51
Source: China Meteorological Administration
