= Ma Zhongchen =

Chinese politician

Ma Zhongchen (Chinese: 马忠臣; September 1936 – January 12, 2021) was a politician from the People's Republic of China.

== Biography ==
Ma was born in Tai'an, Shandong Province, and joined the Chinese Communist Party (CCP) in January 1956. In August 1966, Ma was appointed deputy secretary of the Tai'an County Party Committee. From February 1967 to May 1970, he was affected by the Cultural Revolution and was sent to the countryside to do labor. From May 1970 to August 1973, Ma served as a member of the Standing Committee of the Tai'an County Revolutionary Committee of Shandong Province, and deputy commander of the County Revolutionary Committee's Production Command. In August 1973, Ma was re-appointed as deputy secretary of the Tai'an County Party Committee, the position he previously held in 1966.

In June 1976, Ma became the Secretary of the Zhangqiu County Party Committee of Shandong Province, and Director of the Zhangqiu County Revolutionary Committee. In October 1978, Ma was appointed deputy secretary of the CCP Tai'an Prefectural Committee of Shandong Province, secretary of the Tai'an County Party Committee, and director of the Tai'an County Revolutionary Committee. From September 1980 to July 1981, Ma studied at the Central Party School in the training class for young and middle-aged cadres. In October 1983, he was promoted to secretary of the CCP Tai'an Prefectural Committee and appointed secretary of the Tai'an Municipal Party Committee and deputy Secretary-General of the Shandong Provincial Government. In May 1986, Ma was further promoted to Vice Governor of Shandong Province and Secretary-General of the Shandong Provincial Government. In December 1988, he was appointed deputy secretary of the Shandong Provincial Committee of the CCP. In November 1990, Ma was appointed vice minister and deputy secretary of the Party Leadership Group of the Ministry of Agriculture.

In November 1992, Ma was appointed as the deputy secretary of Henan Provincial Party Committee, and in December of the same year he was appointed the acting governor of Henan. He was confirmed as the governor of Henan in April 1993. In March 1998, Ma was elevated to the secretary of CCP Henan Committee. In July 1998, Ma stepped down from his position as governor of Henan. He maintained his position as Secretary of the Provincial Committee until September 2000.

In September 2000, Ma was appointed deputy Secretary-General of the Central Leading Group for Financial and Economic Affairs, and as deputy Leader of the Central Rural Work Leading Group.

Ma was an alternate member of 12th, 13th and 14th Central Committees of the CCP, a full member of 15th Central Committee, and a standing member of the 10th National Committee of the Chinese People's Political Consultative Congress.

On January 12, 2021, Ma Zhongchen died, at the age of 85.

Political offices
Preceded by Li Changchun	Governor of Henan; 1992–1998	Succeeded by Chen Kuiyuan
Preceded by Li Changchun	Secretary of the CCP Henan Committee; 1998–2000	Succeeded by Chen Kuiyuan
