= Politics of Xiangtan =

The Politics of Xiangtan in Hunan province in the People's Republic of China is structured in a dual party-government system like all other governing institutions in mainland China.

The Mayor of Xiangtan is the highest-ranking official in the People's Government of Xiangtan or Xiangtan Municipal Government. However, in the city's dual party-government governing system, the Mayor has less power than the Communist Party of Xiangtan Municipal Committee Secretary, colloquially termed the "CPC Party Chief of Xiangtan" or "Communist Party Secretary of Xiangtan".

== History ==
Chen Sanxin was probed on suspicion of serious disciplinary violations by the Central Commission for Discipline Inspection (CCDI) in May 2018.

On March 27, 2019, Zhang Yingchun was elected mayor of Xiangtan. She became the first woman to win the office since 1949.

== List of mayors of Xiangtan ==
No.	English name	Chinese name	Took office	Left office	Notes
1	Tan Jingyang	谭景阳	October 1980	October 1983	
2	Li Renshen	李壬申	October 1983	June 1990	
3	Fan Duofu	范多富	June 1990	March 1992	
4	Chen Shuhong	陈叔红	March 1992	February 1995	
5	Chen Shuhong	陈叔红	October 1995	April 2000	
6	Jiang Jianguo	蒋建国	October 1995	April 2000	
7	Chen Run'er	陈润儿	February 2003	April 2003	
8	Peng Xianfa	彭宪法	April 2003	January 2007	
9	Yu Aiguo	余爱国	January 2007	January 2011	
10	Shi Yaobin	史耀斌	January 2011	December 2011	
11	Hu Weilin	胡伟林	December 2011	January 2012	
12	Hu Weilin	胡伟林	January 2012	April 2016	
13	Tan Wensheng	谈文胜	April 2016	March 2019	
14	Zhang Yingchun	张迎春	27 March 2019	10 Jul 2021	
15	Hu Hebo	胡贺波	2 Jan 2021	28 Oct 2024	
16	Li Yongliang	李永亮	28 Oct 2024		

== List of CPC Party secretaries of Xiangtan ==
No.	English name	Chinese name	Took office	Left office	Notes
1	Wu Ruoxu	吴若虚	June 1983	October 1985	
2	Zheng Peimin	郑培民	October 1985	May 1990	
3	Cao Bochun	曹伯纯	May 1990	May 1991	
4	Fan Duofu	范多富	May 1991	August 1995	
5	Chen Shuhong	陈叔红	August 1995	March 1997	
6	Bian Cuiping	卞翠屏	March 1997	February 2003	
7	Chen Run'er	陈润儿	February 2003	November 2006	
8	Peng Xianfa	彭宪法	December 2006	January 2010	
9	Chen Sanxin	陈三新	January 2010	April 2016	
10	Cao Jiongfang	曹炯芳	April 2016	Jul 2021	
11	Zhang Yingchun	张迎春	Jul 2021	Mar 2022	
12	Liu Zhiren	刘志仁	Mar 2022	Aug 2024	
13	Hu Hebo	胡贺波	Aug 2024		
