= Wang Jiong (politician) =

Chinese politician

Wang Jiong (Chinese: 王炯; born September 1964) is a Chinese politician, and current chair of the Chongqing branch of the Chinese People's Political Consultative Conference. He began his political career as an administrator at Wuhan Steel. He was previously the Chinese Communist Party Deputy Committee Secretary of Henan province.

== Life and career ==
Wang was born in Huaibin County, Henan. He studied at the Wuhan Steel College (later Wuhan University of Science and Technology). He joined the Chinese Communist Party (CCP) in November 1984, and began work in July 1985. After graduating, he was assigned to work as a cold mill technician at Wuhan Steel, a large state-owned enterprise. He rose through the ranks at the steel mill, being put in charge of production, then quality control. Eventually he ascended to administrative roles, heading the cold roll sheet factory, then deputy general manager, then party chief of Wuhan Iron and Steel Corporation. He also obtained a master's degree in management science and engineering from Wuhan University of Technology; he also qualified as a senior engineer.

Chosen for further promotion, Wang was transferred to Beijing in October 2008 as the vice chairman of the All-China Federation of Trade Unions, and a secretary of its secretariat. In August 2011, he was made a member of the Anhui provincial CCP standing committee and head of the provincial organization department. In August 2014, he was transferred to the same position in Jiangsu province. In May 2017, he was promoted to deputy party secretary of his home province of Henan. In January 2018, Wang was named Chairman of the Chongqing Chinese People's Political Consultative Conference.

Party political offices
Preceded by Deng Kai	Deputy Party Secretary of Henan; 2017–2018	Succeeded by Yu Hongqiu
