= Song Yuxi =

Chinese politician

Song Yuxi (Chinese: 宋玉玺) (1918–2000) was a Chinese politician. He was born in Lincheng County, Hebei. He was CPPCC Chairman of Henan. He was a delegate to the 7th National People's Congress.

Preceded by Wang Huayun	CPPCC Chairman of Henan	Succeeded by Yan Jimin
