= Zhang Anshun =

Chinese politician

Zhang Anshun (Chinese: 张安顺; born April 1965) is a Chinese politician, serving since 2016 as the secretary-general of the Communist Party Committee of Jilin province, and a member of the provincial Party Standing Committee of Jilin.

Wang was born in 1965 in Pingyin County, Shandong. He graduated from the Jilin University of Technology (since merged into Jilin University), where he studied mechanics and welding. He also obtained an MBA from the Jilin University School of Business. He began his political career in the Communist Youth League system, as the deputy chief and chief of the Changchun Youth League organization. He was later elevated to a member of the municipal Party Standing Committee, the party chief of Chaoyang District, Changchun, and vice-mayor. Then he was sent to become mayor, then party chief of Tonghua. He became a delegate to the National People's Congress in 2008.

In April 2011, Zhang, then 46, became party chief of Yanbian Korean Autonomous Prefecture. A year later he earned a seat on the provincial Party Standing Committee, ascending to sub-provincial level. In February 2016, he was named secretary-general of the provincial party committee.
