= Wang Quanshu =

Chinese politician

- 王全书

Mayor of Pingdingshan
- In office 1991 – on or before 1993

Secretary-General of the Henan Party Committee
- In office 1993 – on or before 2011

Deputy Party Chief of Henan
- In office 2000 – on or before 2011

Chairman of the CPPCC Henan Committee
- In office 2006–2011
- Preceded by: Fan Qinchen
- Succeeded by: Ye Dongsong

Personal details
- Born: March 1945 (age 81) Changyuan County, Henan

Military service
- Allegiance: People's Republic of China
- Branch/service: People's Liberation Army
- Years of service: 1968–1971

Wang Quanshu (Chinese: 王全书; pinyin: Wáng Quánshū; born March 1945) is a Chinese retired politician from Henan province. During his political career he was mayor of Pingdingshan, the secretary-general of the Henan party committee, the deputy party chief of Henan, and the Chairman of the Chinese People's Political Consultative Conference Henan Committee. He retired in 2011.

== Biography ==
Wang Quanshu was born in Changyuan County, Henan in 1945. He has a degree in Chinese language from Henan University. He joined the People's Liberation Army in 1968, serving for some six years. In 1973 he joined the provincial party committee as a secretary, then took on a research position in the Henan Planning Commission. In 1988 he became deputy chair of the Henan Planning and Economics Commission. In 1991, he was named Mayor of Pingdingshan. In 1993, he became secretary-general of the provincial party committee, and a member of the provincial Party Standing Committee. In 2000, he became deputy party chief of Henan.

In 2006, Wang was named Chairman of the Chinese People's Political Consultative Conference Henan Committee. He left politics in 2011, aged 65.

Political offices
Preceded by Fan Qinchen	Chairman of CPPCC Henan Committee; 2006–2011	Succeeded by Ye Dongsong
