= Lou Yangsheng =

Chinese politician

- 楼阳生

Party Secretary of Henan
- In office 1 June 2021 – 31 December 2024
- Deputy: Wang Kai (Governor)
- Preceded by: Wang Guosheng
- Succeeded by: Liu Ning

Chairperson of Henan Provincial People's Congress
- In office June 2021 – January 2025
- Preceded by: Wang Guosheng

Party Secretary of Shanxi
- In office 30 November 2019 – 1 June 2021
- Deputy: Lin Wu (Governor)
- Preceded by: Luo Huining
- Succeeded by: Lin Wu

Chairperson of Shanxi Provincial People's Congress
- In office January 2020 – June 2021
- Preceded by: Luo Huining
- Succeeded by: Lin Wu

Governor of Shanxi
- In office 30 August 2016 – 5 December 2019
- Secretary: Luo Huining→Himself
- Preceded by: Li Xiaopeng
- Succeeded by: Lin Wu

Personal details
- Born: October 1959 (age 66–67) Pujiang County, Zhejiang, China
- Party: Chinese Communist Party
- Education: Zhejiang Normal University; Zhejiang University

Lou Yangsheng (Chinese: 楼阳生; pinyin: Lóu Yángshēng; born October 1959) is a Chinese politician who served as Party Secretary of Henan from 2021 to 2024. Originally from Zhejiang province, Lou was the Party Secretary of Lishui in his early career. He headed the party's Publicity Department in Hainan before being transferred to Shanxi to become the provincial Deputy Party Secretary.

== Biography ==
Lou Yangsheng was born in Pujiang County, Zhejiang, in 1959. During the Cultural Revolution, he worked as a sent-down youth in rural areas near his hometown. In March 1979, Lou was one of the first batch of students admitted to university after the restoration of the Gaokao exams under Deng Xiaoping. He attended Zhejiang Normal University and joined the Chinese Communist Party during his time at the university. He then worked as a middle school teacher in Longyou County. In 1984, Lou became the Communist Youth League secretary of county, beginning his political career.

Lou spent most of his political career in Zhejiang. He rose quickly in the Communist Youth League system, through 'acid tests' in Longyou County in the local party organization there. Then he was elevated to CYL leader of Quzhou, then CYL leader of Zhejiang province. In June 1997, he earned a Master's Business Administration (MBA) from Zhejiang University. In 1999, he began a short term as a visiting scholar at University of Houston in the United States. In November 1999, he left the CYL system to become mayor of Jinhua, then party secretary the city of Lishui. During his terms in Jinhua and Lishui, Lou worked under the direction of then-Zhejiang party secretary Xi Jinping. As such Lou has been named by political observers as a member of the "New Zhijiang Army", politicians who once worked under Xi and share his governing philosophies.

In January 2008, he became vice chair of the People's Political Consultative Conference of Zhejiang and the head of the province's United Front Department. In January 2009, Lou left Zhejiang to become a member of the provincial Party Standing Committee of Hainan and the province's party organization department head; in February 2010 he became concurrently the secretary of the Education Work Commission of the province. In 2012 he was transferred again, this time to Hubei, to serve on the standing committee there and also as head of the provincial organization department.

After the Shanxi "political earthquake" of 2014 which led to the demise of many top officials in the province, Lou was transferred to Shanxi province to become deputy party secretary; he replaced Jin Daoming, who was dismissed due to corruption. On August 30, 2016, Lou was appointed acting governor of Shanxi province; he was confirmed as governor on November 28.

In November 2019, Lou was appointed as the Party Secretary of Shanxi.

In June 2021, Lou was appointed as the Party Secretary of Henan.

Government offices
Preceded by Tang Lilu	Mayor of Jinhua; 2002–2003	Succeeded by Xu Zhiping
Preceded by Li Xiaopeng	Governor of Shanxi; 2016–2019	Succeeded by Lin Wu
Party political offices
Preceded by Wang Huizhong	Secretary of the Zhejiang Provincial Committee of the Communist Youth League of China; 1996–1999	Succeeded by Ge Huijun
Preceded by Ding Yaomin	Party Secretary of Lishui; 2003–2008	Succeeded by Chen Ronggao
Preceded by Wang Peimin	Head of the United Front Work Department of the Zhejiang Provincial Committee of the Chinese Communist Party; 2008–2009	Succeeded by Tang Lilu
Preceded by Liu Qi	Head of the Organization Department of Hainan Provincial Committee of the Chinese Communist Party; 2009–2012	Succeeded by Li Xiuling
Preceded by Hou Chang'an	Head of the Organization Department of Hubei Provincial Committee of the Chinese Communist Party; 2012–2014	Succeeded by He Jiatie
Preceded by Jin Daoming	Specifically-designated Deputy Party Secretary of Shanxi; 2014–2016	Succeeded by Huang Xiaowei
Preceded by Luo Huining	Party Secretary of Shanxi; 2019–2021	Succeeded by Lin Wu
Preceded by Wang Guosheng	Party Secretary of Henan; 2021–	Succeeded by Lin Ning
Assembly seats
Preceded by Luo Huining	Chairperson of Shanxi Provincial People's Congress; 2020–2021	Succeeded by Lin Wu
Preceded by Wang Guosheng	Chairperson of Henan Provincial People's Congress; 2016–present	Incumbent
