= Lin Xiao =

Chinese politician (1920–2018)

Lin Xiao (Chinese: 林晓; November 1920 – 5 October 2018) was a Chinese politician. He was born in Wei County, Handan, Hebei. He was Chairman of the Henan People's Congress (1988–1989, 1992–1993). He was a delegate to the 7th National People's Congress (1988–1993).

Lin died in Zhengzhou on 5 October 2018, aged 97.

Preceded by Zhang Shude	Chairman of the Henan People's Congress; 1988–1989, 1992–1993	Succeeded by Yang Xizong
