= Liu Jie (politician, born 1915) =

Chinese politician

- 刘杰

Party Secretary of Henan
- In office 1981 – 1985
- Preceded by: Duan Junyi
- Succeeded by: Yang Xizong

Governor of Henan
- In office September 1979 – May 1981
- Preceded by: Duan Junyi
- Succeeded by: Dai Suli

Personal details
- Born: February 17, 1915
- Died: September 23, 2018 (aged 103)
- Party: Chinese Communist Party

Chinese name
- Simplified Chinese: 刘杰
- Traditional Chinese: 劉杰
Transcriptions
Standard Mandarin
- Hanyu Pinyin: Liú Jié

Liu Jie (Chinese: 刘杰; pinyin: Liú Jié; 17 February 1915 – 23 September 2018) was a Chinese communist politician. From 1960 to the outbreak of the Cultural Revolution he was minister of the Second Ministry of Machine Building which was responsible for the nuclear industry. Subsequently, he was governor of the province of Henan from 1979 to 1981, and CPC Committee Secretary of Henan (1981–1985).

Preceded by Duan Junyi	Governor of Henan; 1979–1981	Succeeded by Dai Suli
Preceded by Duan Junyi	Party Secretary of Henan; 1981–1985	Succeeded by Yang Xizong
