= Lin Yinghai =

Chinese politician

- 林英海

Chairman of the Henan Provincial Committee of the Chinese People's Political Consultative Conference
- In office April 1993 – January 2003
- Preceded by: Yan Jimin
- Succeeded by: Fan Qinchen

Personal details
- Born: February 1932 Taiqian County, Henan, China
- Died: 2 December 2014 (aged 82) Zhengzhou, Henan, China
- Party: Chinese Communist Party
- Education: Shandong Normal University; Beijing Normal University

Lin Yinghai (Chinese: 林英海; pinyin: Lín Yīnghǎi; February 1932 – 2 December 2014) was a Chinese politician who served chairman of the Henan Provincial Committee of the Chinese People's Political Consultative Conference from 1993 to 2003.

Lin was a representative of the 13th, 14th, 15th, 16th, 17th, and 18th National Congress of the Chinese Communist Party. He was a delegate to the 8th and 10th National People's Congress. He was a member of the 9th National Committee of the Chinese People's Political Consultative Conference.

== Biography ==
Lin was born in Taiqian County, Henan, in February 1932.

Lin joined the Chinese Communist Party (CCP) in April 1954. After graduating from Shandong Normal College (now Shandong Normal University), he entered Beijing Normal University in 1958, where he majored in Chinese language and literature. After graduation, he stayed and worked at the university, and ultimately being appointed deputy director of the Chinese Department in June 1968.

From January 1969 to April 1974, Lin was on sick leave.

Beginning in 1974, Lin served in several posts in his home-county Taiqian, including director of the County Health Bureau, director of the County Science and Education Office, deputy party secretary, party secretary, and chairman of the County People's Congress.

Lin rose to become deputy head of the Publicity Department of the CCP Henan Provincial Committee in April 1983, but having held the position for only a year. He was appointed secretary of the Henan Provincial Discipline Inspection Commission in August 1984 and was admitted to member of the CCP Henan Provincial Committee, the province's top authority. He was named deputy party secretary of Henan in November 1990, concurrently serving as chairman of the Henan Provincial Committee of the Chinese People's Political Consultative Conference since April 1993.

On 2 December 2014, Lin died in Zhengzhou, at the age of 82.

Assembly seats
Preceded by Yan Jimin	Chairman of the Henan Provincial Committee of the Chinese People's Political Consultative Conference; 1993–2003	Succeeded by Fan Qinchen
