= Guo Chaoren =

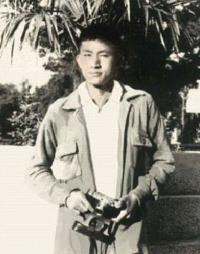
Guo Chaoren during his university years

Guo Chaoren (Chinese: 郭超人; October 31, 1934 – June 15, 2000) was a president of Xinhua News Agency of China.

Guo was born in Guangji County (now Wuxue), Hubei Province. His also used the name Lan Ting (蓝汀). From 1952 to 1956, he studied in the department of Chinese literature at Peking University, majoring in journalism. After graduation, he volunteered to work as a journalist at Xinhua News Agency in Tibet, and spent 14 years there. In spring of 1970, he became a journalist at Xinhua News Agency in Shaanxi. In Autumn of 1978, he transferred to Xinhua News Agency in Sichuan, and became a journalist and the vice director at that branch. In January 1983, he entered Xinhua News Agency headquarter and became secretary general as well as a member of Party group. In May 1984, he was appointed as vice president of Xinhua News Agency. He was promoted to vice secretary of CCP group and vice president of Xinhua News Agency in March 1986. From November 1992, he served as president and party chief of Xinhua until his death.

He was a member of 13th, 14th and 15th Central Committees of the Chinese Communist Party.
