= Dai Suli =

Chinese politician

Dai Suli (Chinese: 戴苏理) (21 November 1919 – 22 January 2000) was a Chinese politician. He was born in Xiangyuan County, Shanxi Province. He was governor of Henan Province (1981–1983). He was a member of the Central Advisory Commission.

Preceded by Liu Jie	Governor of Henan; 1981–1983	Succeeded by Yu Mingtao
