= Zhang Shude =

Chinese politician

Zhang Shude (Chinese: 张树德) (1922–1988) was a Chinese politician. He was born in Lingshi County, Shanxi Province. He was the 4th Chairman of the People's Standing Congress of Henan. He was a delegate to the 4th National People's Congress, 6th National People's Congress and 7th National People's Congress.

Preceded by Zhao Wenfu	Chairman of the People's Standing Congress of Henan	Succeeded by Lin Xiao
