= Zhang Yijiong =

Chinese politician (born 1955)

Zhang Yijiong (Chinese: 张裔炯; born 26 October 1955) is a Chinese politician, previously serving from 2012 to 2022 as the executive deputy head of the United Front Work Department of the Chinese Communist Party (minister-level).

Zhang was born in Shanghai. In January 1971, Zhang joined the Chinese Communist Party. He began his political career as the deputy head of the Communist Youth League organization in Qinghai province. He also worked at a potash mine, and was president of the Qinghai Potash Factory. He also served as the head of the economic and trade commission of Qinghai, and party chief of the provincial capital Xining.

In November 2000, Zhang became a member of the provincial Party Standing Committee. In December 2006, he became the deputy party chief of Tibet Autonomous Region. In October 2010 he was made Political and Legal Affairs Commission Secretary of Tibet. In December 2012, he was transferred to become deputy party chief of Jiangxi. In February 2012, he joined the provincial-ministerial ranks, becoming the Chair of the Political Consultative Conference of Jiangxi province.

In June 2012, he was made executive deputy head of the United Front Work Department of the Communist Party.

Zhang was an alternate of the 17th Central Committee of the Chinese Communist Party, and a full member of the 18th Central Committee.

Party political offices
Preceded by Zhu Weiqun	Executive Deputy Head of the United Front Work Department; 2012–	Succeeded by Chen Xiaojiang
Preceded by Wang Xiankui	Deputy Communist Party Secretary of Jiangxi; 2010–2012	Succeeded by Shang Yong
Preceded by Hu Chunhua	Deputy Communist Party Secretary of Tibet Autonomous Region; 2006–2010	Succeeded by Hao Peng
