= Xie Fuzhan =

Chinese economist and politician

- 谢伏瞻
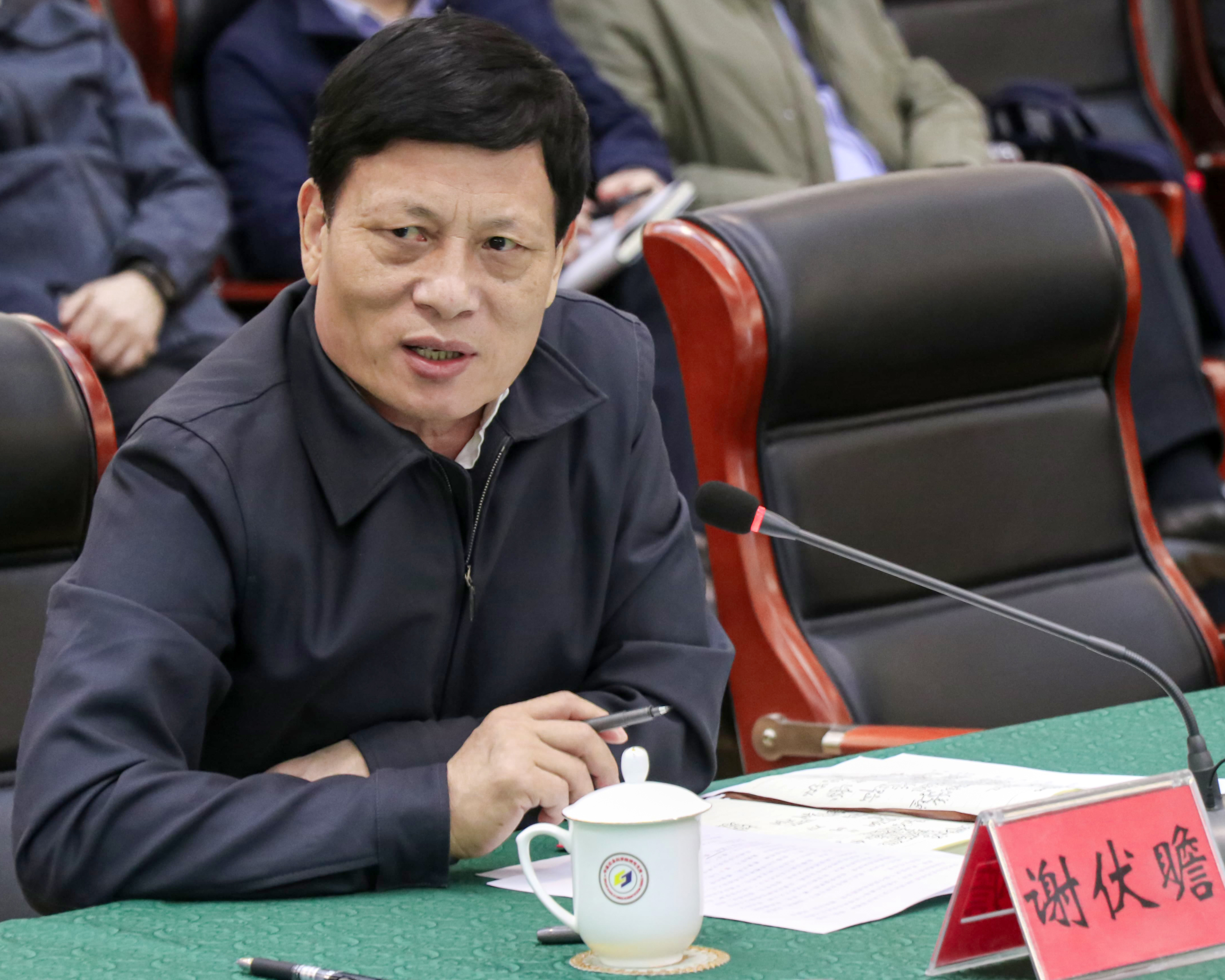
- Xie Fuzhan

President of the Chinese Academy of Social Sciences
- In office 20 March 2018 – 1 May 2022
- Preceded by: Wang Weiguang
- Succeeded by: Shi Taifeng

Party Secretary of Henan
- In office 26 March 2016 – 21 March 2018
- Preceded by: Guo Gengmao
- Succeeded by: Wang Guosheng

Governor of Henan
- In office 2 April 2013 – 5 April 2016
- Preceded by: Guo Gengmao
- Succeeded by: Chen Run'er

Director of the State Council Research Office
- In office 10 June 2008 – 20 March 2013
- Preceded by: Wei Liqun
- Succeeded by: Ning Jizhe

Director of the National Bureau of Statistics of China
- In office 12 October 2006 – 26 September 2008
- Preceded by: Qiu Xiaohua
- Succeeded by: Ma Jiantang

Personal details
- Born: 9 August 1954 (age 71) Tianmen, Hubei, China
- Party: Chinese Communist Party
- Education: Huazhong University of Science and Technology; Harvard University; University of Cambridge
- Occupation: Politician
- Profession: Economist

Xie Fuzhan (Chinese: 谢伏瞻; born 9 August 1954) is a Chinese economist and politician who served as the President of the Chinese Academy of Social Sciences and the Communist Party Secretary and governor of Henan. Before that, he was the Director of China's National Bureau of Statistics and the State Council Research Office.

Xie has an accomplished academic career. He has published many articles in newspapers and journals, held a professorship at his alma mater Huazhong University of Science and Technology, and twice won China's Sun Yefang Economics Prize.

== Biography ==
Xie Fuzhan was born in Tianmen, Hubei. After graduating from Huazhong University of Science and Technology of Wuhan in 1980, he worked as a reporter for the People's Daily for three years. He then went back to school, obtaining a master's degree in engineering from the Machinery Industry Automation Research Institute in 1986. Afterwards he joined the Development Research Center (DRC) of the State Council of China.

Xie spent most of the next two decades at the DRC, where he led or participated in numerous research projects. He also went abroad to further his studies. From 1991 to 1992 Xie was a visiting scholar at the economics department of Princeton University, and then completed an executive program at the John F. Kennedy School of Government at Harvard University. In 2006 he completed another executive program at the Judge Business School of the University of Cambridge. From 1999 to 2006 Xie was the deputy director of the DRC.

In October 2006 Xie Fuzhan was appointed commissioner of the National Bureau of Statistics (NBS), replacing Qiu Xiaohua who had been fired for corruption. He held the position until September 2008. As commissioner he advocated new statistical methods for improving quality of the data. He openly refused to make forecasts for China's economy for fear that any such forecast could affect the data collection.

In June 2008 Xie was appointed director of the State Council Research Office. In March 2013 he was appointed Deputy Communist Party Secretary of Henan in central China, and was elected Governor by the Henan Provincial Congress in April. On 26 March 2016, he was elevated to Party Secretary of Henan, replacing Guo Gengmao.

In March 2018, Xie was appointed the President of the Chinese Academy of Social Sciences.

Xie was a member of the Central Commission for Discipline Inspection of the 17th Central Committee of the Chinese Communist Party, and is a full member of the 18th and 19th Central Committees.

== Academic career ==
Xie Fuzhan is a prominent economist who has won several major awards. He is a prolific writer whose articles have been published at many newspapers and academic journals. His major research areas include macroeconomic policies, economic development, and enterprise reform. He worked on a number of significant research projects in collaboration with the World Bank, the United Nations Development Programme, and the Asian Development Bank. He has been an advisor to the Chinese Academy of Social Sciences, a professor and doctoral student advisor at his alma mater Huazhong University of Science and Technology, and an adjunct faculty member at Tsinghua University. In 2007 he was one of the three vice chairmen of the UNESCO Statistical Commission.

=== Selected works ===
- Real Estate: Strategic Development and Countermeasures (2000)
- Fiscal Control and Reform (2001)
- Thirty Key Issues Related to Further Reform (2003)
- Road to Urbanization with Chinese Characteristics (2004)
- China Real Estate Taxation System (2005)
- China Real Estate Taxation System Proposition (2006)

=== Awards ===
- Sun Yefang Economics Prize (1991 and 2001)
- National Science and Technology Award (1996)
- State Council of China: Exceptional Contribution Specialist

Party political offices
| Preceded by Guo Gengmao | Party Secretary of Henan; 2016–2018 | Succeeded by Wang Guosheng |
Political offices
| Preceded by Guo Gengmao | Governor of Henan; 2013–2016 | Succeeded by Chen Run'er |
Academic offices
| Preceded by Wang Weiguang | President of the Chinese Academy of Social Sciences; 2018–2022 | Succeeded by Shi Taifeng |
