= Yin Hong =

Chinese politician

- 尹弘
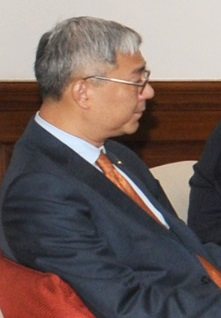
- Yin Hong

Party Secretary of Jiangxi
- Incumbent
- Assumed office 7 December 2022
- Deputy: Ye Jianchun; Chen Yongqi; Zhuang zhaolin
- Preceded by: Yi Lianhong

Party Secretary of Gansu
- In office 31 March 2021 – 7 December 2022
- Deputy: Ren Zhenhe (Governor)
- Preceded by: Lin Duo
- Succeeded by: Hu Changsheng

Governor of Henan
- In office 6 December 2019 – 31 March 2021
- Preceded by: Chen Run'er
- Succeeded by: Wang Kai

Personal details
- Born: June 1963 (age 63) Huzhou, Zhejiang, China
- Party: Chinese Communist Party
- Education: Shanghai University of Technology

Yin Hong (Chinese: 尹弘; born June 1963) is a Chinese politician who is the current party secretary of Jiangxi. He served as the governor of Henan from December 2019 to March 2021. Previously he had spent his entire political career in Shanghai.

== Biography ==
Yin was born in Huzhou. He graduated from the Shanghai University of Technology with a double major in engineering and law. He started to work in the university's Communist Youth League organization in July 1985 after graduation. In 1988, he obtained a master's degree in law from Shanghai Jiao Tong University. In 1993, he was Southern Illinois University for one year as a visiting scholar. In 1994 after coming back from the United States, he became the general secretary of the Communist Youth League organization of the newly established Shanghai University.

He was then transferred to the Shanghai planning commission to work as the vice director in December 1994. He then successively served as the deputy governor of Songjiang County, the deputy governor of Changning District from 1996 to 2001.

In July 2001, he joined the third batch of Shanghai cadres to join the "Help Tibet" campaign. At 38, he was appointed as the deputy party chief of Shigatse in Tibet, one of the most remote cities of China, on the border with Nepal and Bhutan. While in Tibet, he suffered from severe altitude sickness, with symptoms of frequent headache and insomnia. His hair turned grizzled after one year as a result.

After coming back from Tibet, he was appointed as the governor of Zhabei District in July 2004, and then the deputy secretary-general of the Shanghai government in May 2008.

In May 2012, he was named a member of the Shanghai municipal party standing committee and in June became Secretary-General of the Party Committee, as the political secretary to Yu Zhengsheng and then Han Zheng. In January 2017, he was promoted to deputy party chief of Shanghai.

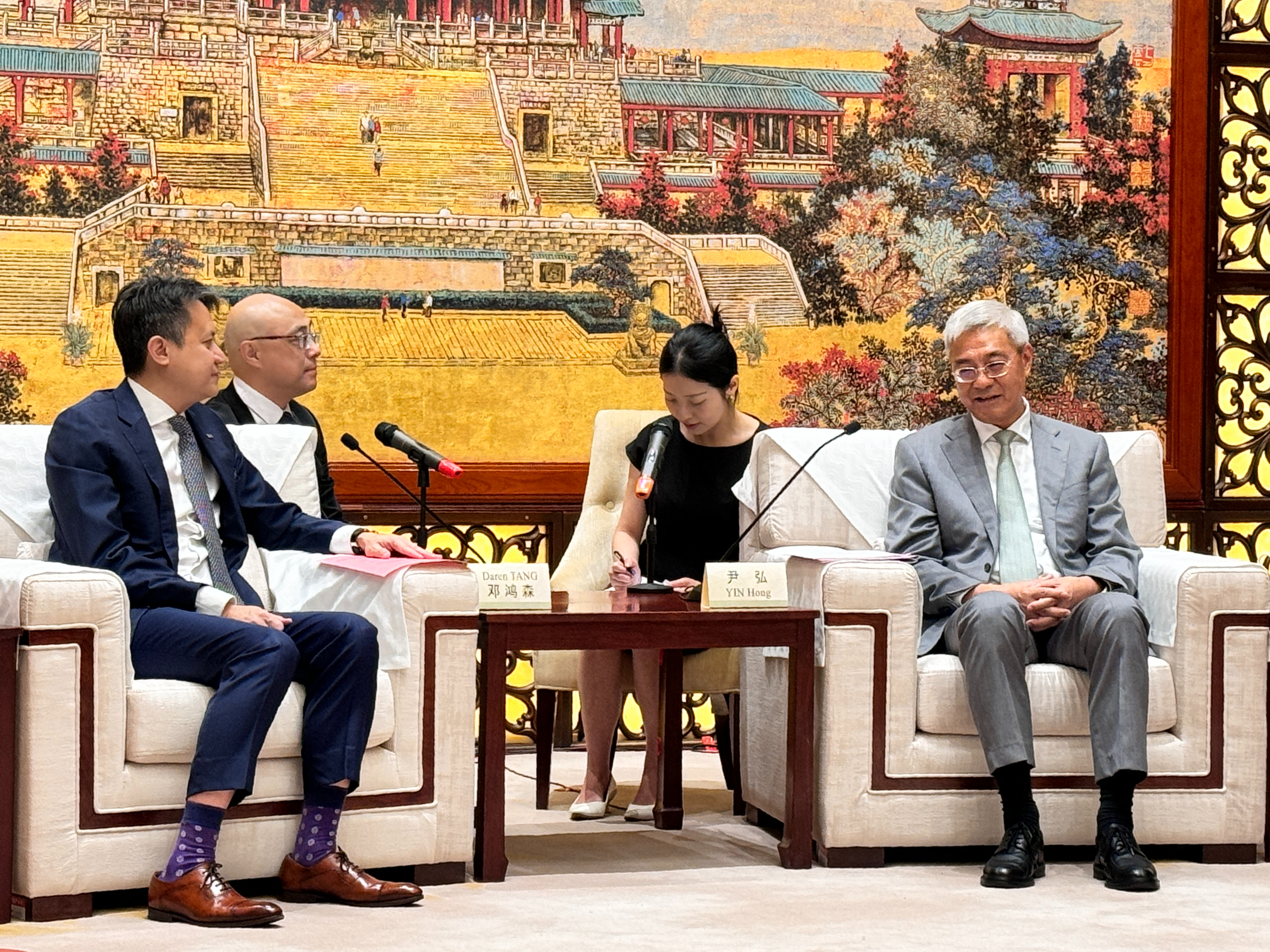
WIPO Director General Daren Tang meets with Yin Hong (right) in September 2024

On 6 December 2019, he was appointed acting Governor of Henan Province. He was elected as the governor on 14 January 2020. In his Henan stint, COVID-19 pandemic smashed through China. In Henan, many tough and controversial measures were taken, such as using muck trucks and trenches to blockade the road with Hubei which was the centre of the pandemic, and putting up radical slogans such as "If you come back home while being infected with Covid-19, then you are a shameful descendant to your family". Such measures were popular among Chinese netizens on Weibo, and Geng Hong was praised as the "provincial governor you should steal from others".

On 31 March 2021, Yin was appointed Party Secretary of Gansu.

In December 2022, he was appointed Party Secretary of Jiangxi, replacing Yi Lianhong.

Party political offices
Preceded by Lin Duo	Party Secretary of Gansu; 2021–2022	Succeeded by Hu Changsheng
Preceded by Yi Lianhong	Party Secretary of Jiangxi; 2022–present	Incumbent
Government offices
Preceded by Chen Run'er	Governor of Henan; 2019–2021	Succeeded by Wang Kai
