= Zhu Weiqun =

Chinese politician

Zhu Weiqun (Chinese: 朱维群; born March 1947) is a Chinese politician. He formerly served as the executive deputy head of the United Front Work Department of the Chinese Communist Party (CCP).

Born in Jianhu County, Jiangsu Province, Zhu attended the Jingshan School and Renmin University. He graduated from the department of journalism of the graduate school of the Chinese Academy of Social Sciences, with a master's degree. He joined the Chinese Communist Party in July 1970. In February 1999, he was appointed Deputy Head of the United Front Work Department of the CCP, where he handled ethnic affairs. He became the executive deputy of the Department in January 2006, ascending to full minister rank.

In 2013, Zhu retired from active politics, and became the Chair of the Ethnic and Religious Affairs Committee of the Chinese People's Political Consultative Conference. In May 2013, Zhu was asked about whether to allow for openly religious Communist Party members in response to a change in regulation in the Communist Party of Vietnam, Zhu said, "Chinese Communist Party members should not be allowed to be religious."

Zhu has also been frequently critical of the 14th Dalai Lama and what he calls the "Tibet separatist clique."

Zhu was a member of the 16th Central Commission for Discipline Inspection of the Chinese Communist Party and a member of the 17th Central Committee of the Chinese Communist Party.

Party political offices
Preceded by Liang Jinquan	Executive Deputy Head of the United Front Work Department; 2006–2012	Succeeded by Zhang Yijiong
