= Guo Gengmao =

Chinese politician

- 郭庚茂
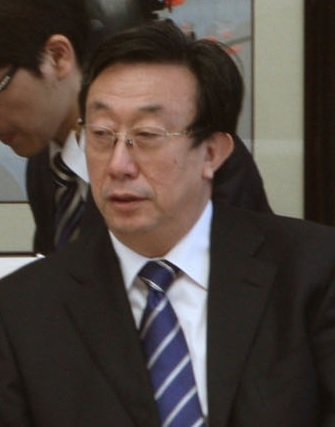

Party Secretary of Henan
- In office March 2013 – March 2016
- Preceded by: Lu Zhangong
- Succeeded by: Xie Fuzhan

Governor of Henan
- In office 8 April 2008 – 27 March 2013
- Preceded by: Li Chengyu
- Succeeded by: Xie Fuzhan

Governor of Hebei
- In office 31 October 2006 – 15 April 2008
- Preceded by: Ji Yunshi
- Succeeded by: Hu Chunhua

Personal details
- Born: December 1950 (age 75) Jizhou, Hebei, China
- Party: Chinese Communist Party (1972–present)
- Education: Peking University

Guo Gengmao (Chinese: 郭庚茂; pinyin: Guō Gēngmào; born December 1950) is a politician of the People's Republic of China. He served as Party Secretary and Governor of Henan Province, as well as Governor of his native Hebei Province.

== Biography ==
Guo Gengmao was born in Ji County, Hebei (now the county-level city of Jizhou), in December 1950. He joined the Chinese Communist Party (CCP) in March 1972. Guo graduated from the political science division of the International Politics faculty of Peking University. He also obtained a master's degree in Political Economics from the CCP Central Party School.

Guo served in various positions in Hebei province for some 30 years. He began work in November 1975 as the deputy party secretary of a people's commune in Ji County. He was mayor of Xingtai from 1994 to 1997. Guo was then promoted to vice-governor of Hebei in 1998 and Executive Vice Governor of Hebei in 2000, as well as deputy secretary of the provincial government's leading party group. Guo then became the acting governor of Hebei and concurrently the deputy party secretary in October 2006, and was officially elected governor in January 2007.

In a reshuffling of provincial leadership in 2008, Guo was transferred to the neighboring Henan Province. He became the Deputy Party Secretary of Henan in March 2008 in preparation for his governorship, and was appointed as the acting governor of Henan on April 7, 2008. On January 17, 2009, Guo was confirmed as governor of Henan.

In 2013, upon the departure of Lu Zhangong, Guo was promoted to party chief, having served for some seven years as governor of two provinces by this point. On 26 March 2016, Guo stepped down as Henan party chief after reaching retirement age. He was succeeded by the governor Xie Fuzhan. After retiring from active politics, Guo sat on the National People's Congress Agriculture and Rural Affairs Committee as a vice chair.

Guo was an alternate of the 16th Central Committee and is a full member of the 17th Central Committee and the 18th Central Committee of the CCP. He was a delegate to the 10th, 11th, and 12th National People's Congresses.

Party political offices
| Preceded by Lu Zhangong | Party Secretary of Henan; 2013–2016 | Succeeded by Xie Fuzhan |
Political offices
| Preceded by Li Chengyu | Governor of Henan; 2008–2013 | Succeeded by Xie Fuzhan |
| Preceded by Ji Yunshi | Governor of Hebei; 2006–2008 | Succeeded by Hu Chunhua |
