= Wang Kai (politician) =

Chinese politician (born 1962)

- 王凯
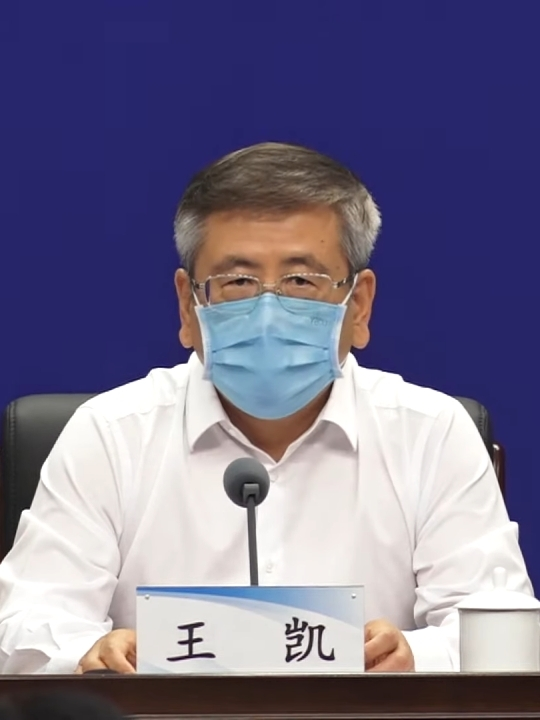
- Wang in 2021

Governor of Henan
- In office 2 April 2021 – 24 September 2026; Acting until 16 June 2021
- Party Secretary: Wang Guosheng; Lou Yangsheng; Liu Ning; Zhou Zuyi
- Preceded by: Yin Hong
- Succeeded by: Wang Lujin (acting)

Party Secretary of Changchun
- In office April 2019 – March 2021
- Preceded by: Wang Junzheng

Personal details
- Born: July 1962 (age 64) Luoyang, Henan, China
- Party: Chinese Communist Party
- Education: Shanxi University; Renmin University of China; Wuhan University

Chinese name
- Traditional Chinese: 王凱
- Simplified Chinese: 王凯
Transcriptions
Standard Mandarin
- Hanyu Pinyin: Wáng Kǎi

Wang Kai (Chinese: 王凯; born July 1962) is a Chinese politician who served as the governor of Henan from April 2021 to September 2026. Previously he served as the party chief of Changchun, the capital of northeast China's Jilin province. He entered the workforce in October 1983, and joined the Chinese Communist Party in December 1984.

== Early life and education ==
Wang was born in Luoyang, Henan, in July 1962. After taking his college entrance examination in 1979, he was admitted to Shanxi University, where he majored in political economics. After university in 1983, he became a teacher at the Chinese Communist Party's School in Jincheng of the Chinese Communist Party (CCP). In September 1988, he entered the Renmin University of China, earning a master's degree in political economics.

== Career ==
In July 1991, he was appointed an official of the Case Room of the Central Commission for Discipline Inspection, the Party's agency in charge of anti-corruption efforts. In April 2001, he was transferred to southwest China's Guangxi and appointed the vice mayor of Wuzhou. In August 2003, he was appointed head of the Organization Department of Wuzhou Municipal CCP Committee and was admitted to the standing committee of the Party, the city's top authority. In September 2006, he was appointed deputy Party chief, concurrently holding the position of mayor since February 2008. During that time, he obtained a doctor's degree in economics from Wuhan University in June 2012. In January 2013 he became the deputy Party chief of Yulin, rising to Party chief the next year. He became a member of the Standing Committee of the CCP Guangxi Provincial Committee in November 2016 before being assigned to the similar position in northeast China's Jilin province in March 2017. He also served as head of the Organization Department of the CCP Jilin Provincial Committee. In April 2019, he was named Party chief of Changchun, replacing Wang Junzheng. In April 2021, he was transferred to his home province of Henan and appointed governor. It would be his first job as "first-in-charge" of a province. In October 2022, Wang was elected as a full member of the 20th Central Committee of the Chinese Communist Party.

On 23 Septemb 2026, he stopped serving as Deputy Secretary of the Henan Party Provincial Committee, Secretary of the Party Leadership Group of the Henan Provincial People's Government, and Governor of Henan. On 6 November 2026, he was appointed as the vice chairman of the National People's Congress Supervisory and Judicial Affairs Committee at the 25th meeting of the Standing Committee of the 14th National People's Congress.

Government offices
Preceded by Yu Yuanhui	Mayor of Wuzhou; 2008–2013	Succeeded by Zhu Xueqing
Preceded by Han Yuanli	Mayor of Yulin; 2013–2014	Succeeded by Su Haitang
Preceded by Yin Hong	Governor of Henan; 2021–2026	Succeeded by Wang Lujin
Party political offices
Preceded by Jin Xiangjun	Party Secretary of Yulin; 2014–2017	Succeeded by Mu Gongming
Preceded by Lin Wu	Head of the Organization Department of CPC Jilin Provincial Committee; 2017–2019	Succeeded by Wang Xiaoping
Preceded by Wang Junzheng	Party Secretary of Changchun; 2019–2021	Succeeded by TBA
