= Ye Dongsong =

Chinese politician

Ye Dongsong (Chinese: 叶冬松, born 1951 in Wuwei, Anhui) is a Chinese politician. He served as Chairman of the CPPCC Henan Committee from 2011 to 2018. In January 2018, he was transferred to the party secretary of the Hebei Provincial Political Consultative Conference and was elected as a member of the 13th CPPCC National Committee.

Ai Wenli, one of Ye's deputies, former vice chairman of the Hebei Provincial Committee of the Chinese People's Political Consultative Conference, was placed under investigation in July 2018 and was sentenced to 8 years in prison for bribery in 2019.
