= Wang Huayun =

Chinese politician

Wang Huayun (Chinese: 王化云) (January 7, 1908 – February 18, 1992) was a Chinese politician. He was born in Guantao County, Hebei. He was a graduate of Peking University. He was CPPCC Chairman of Henan. He was a delegate to the 1st, 2nd, 3rd, 4th, 5th and 6th National People's Congress.
