= Chen Run'er =

Chinese politician

- 陈润儿

Party Secretary of Ningxia
- In office 25 October 2019 – 28 March 2022
- Preceded by: Shi Taifeng
- Succeeded by: Liang Yanshun

Governor of Henan
- In office 7 April 2016 – 25 October 2019
- Preceded by: Xie Fuzhan
- Succeeded by: Yin Hong

Party Secretary of Changsha
- In office November 2006 – April 2013
- Preceded by: Mei Kebao
- Succeeded by: Yi Lianhong

Personal details
- Born: October 1957 (age 68) Chaling County, Hunan, China
- Party: Chinese Communist Party
- Education: Hunan Agricultural University

Chinese name
- Simplified Chinese: 陈润儿
- Traditional Chinese: 陳潤兒
Transcriptions
Standard Mandarin
- Hanyu Pinyin: Chén Rùn'ér

Chen Run'er (Chinese: 陈润儿; born October 1957) is a Chinese politician who served as the Party Secretary of Ningxia from October 2019 to March 2022. He formerly served as Governor of Henan Province, the Deputy Communist Party Chief of Heilongjiang Province, and Party Chief of the cities of Changsha and Xiangtan in his home province of Hunan.

== Biography ==
Chen Run'er was born in October 1957 in Chaling County, Hunan Province. In September 1975, Chen Run'er began his career, starting as Secretary of a People's Commune in Chaling County, Hunan Province. Three months later, he joined the Chinese Communist Party. Over the next two years, he held various roles within different communes and the county's Business Bureau. After completing his training, he was appointed Deputy Governor of Chaling County in July 1985 and was promoted to Governor in April 1987. By September 1990, he had been reappointed as Secretary of the County Party Committee. From 1983 to 1985 he studied agriculture at Hunan Agricultural University.

In 1992, Chen moved to Chenzhou, where he served as Secretary of the Municipal Party Committee and a member of the Regional Committee. Between September 1993 and July 1994, he underwent further training at the Central Party School, returning to his role as Deputy Secretary of the Chenzhou Prefectural Party Committee. When Chenzhou transitioned to a prefecture-level city in December 1994, he continued as Deputy Secretary of the Chenzhou Municipal Committee. In August 1997, Chen transferred to the Loudi region, where he held multiple positions, including Deputy Secretary of the Local Party Committee, Deputy Commissioner, and Commissioner of the Administrative Office. In February 1999, he was appointed Deputy Director of the Hunan Provincial Department of Geology and Mineral Resources. A year later, he moved to Xiangtan City, where he served as Mayor and later as Secretary of the Municipal Party Committee. In 2006, Chen took on a new role in Changsha, becoming a member of the Standing Committee of the Hunan Provincial Party Committee while also serving as Secretary of the Changsha Municipal Party Committee. Starting in 2013, he was assigned to Heilongjiang Province as Deputy Secretary of the Provincial Party Committee, focusing on local political and legal affairs during his tenure. Three years later, he was appointed Deputy Secretary of the CCP Henan Provincial Committee and Governor of Henan. In March 2016, Chen was transferred to Henan Province in central China as Deputy Party Chief and Governor Designate. On 7 April 2016, the Henan Provincial People's Congress duly elected Chen as Governor of Henan, succeeding Xie Fuzhan, who had become the provincial party chief. On 25 October 2019, he has appointed as the Party Secretary of Ningxia.

On 20 April, he was made vice chairperson of the National People's Congress Agriculture and Rural Affairs Committee. In 2024, Chen Run'er led the 20th Central Ecological and Environmental Protection Supervision Group in overseeing environmental protection efforts in Chongqing.

Chen was an alternate of the 17th and the 18th Central Committees of the Chinese Communist Party, and is a full member of the 19th Central Committee.

He is considered to be an Ethnic Affairs policy specialist.

Government offices
Preceded by Jiang Jianguo	Mayor of Xiangtan; 2000–2003	Succeeded by Peng Xianfa
Preceded by Xie Fuzhan	Governor of Henan; 2016–2019	Succeeded by Yin Hong
Party political offices
Preceded by Bian Cuiping	Party Secretary of Xiangtan; 2003–2006	Succeeded by Peng Xianfa
Preceded by Mei Kebao	Party Secretary of Changsha; 2006–2013	Succeeded by Yi Lianhong
Preceded by Du Jiahao	Specifically-designated Deputy Party Secretary of Heilongjiang; 2013–2016	Succeeded by Huang Jiansheng
Preceded by Shi Taifeng	Party Secretary of Ningxia; 2019–2022	Succeeded by Liang Yanshun
Assembly seats
Preceded by Shi Taifeng	Chairman of the People's Congress of Ningxia Hui Autonomous Region; 2020–2022	Succeeded by Liang Yanshun
