= Liu Bing (People's Congress Chairmen) =

Chinese politician

- 刘冰

People's Congress Chairman of Gansu
- In office 1986–1988
- Preceded by: Li Dengying
- Succeeded by: Xu Feiqing

Personal details
- Born: December 7, 1921 Lüdian Township, Yichuan County, Henan, China
- Died: 24 July 2017 (aged 95) Beijing, China
- Party: Chinese Communist Party

Chinese name
- Simplified Chinese: 刘冰
- Traditional Chinese: 劉冰
Transcriptions
Standard Mandarin
- Hanyu Pinyin: Liu Bing

Liu Bing (Chinese: 刘冰; December 7, 1921 - July 24, 2017) was a Chinese politician. He joined the Chinese Communist Party (CCP) in 1938.

== Biography ==
Liu Bing was born in Lüdian Township, Yichuan County, Henan. His birth name was Yao Faguang (Chinese: 姚发光). Orphaned at a young age, in 1938 he went to Yan'an to study at the Counter-Japanese Military and Political University at the age of 17. Upon graduation, he successively held various positions, including Head of the Youth Work Section at the Cadre Training School attached to the 129th Division of the Eighth Route Army; Youth Affairs Officer at the 6th Branch of the Anti-Japanese Military and Political University; Member of the CCP Qinshui County Work Committee and Chairman of the Youth National Salvation Federation; Chairman of the Youth National Salvation Federation for the Taiyue-Yuenan Region; Deputy Secretary of the CCP Mianchi County Committee and Secretary of the CCP Yiyang County Committee; Head of the Youth Work Department under the CCP Western Henan Regional Committee; and Director of the Youth Federation of the Western Henan Liberated Area.

Following the proclamation of the People's Republic of China in 1949, Liu Bing successively served as Secretary of the Youth Work Committee of the Henan Provincial Committee of the Chinese Communist Party and Secretary of the Henan Provincial Committee of the Communist Youth League of China. In 1953, he was transferred to serve as Director of the Office of the Central Committee of the China New Democratic Youth League (a position redesignated as deputy director of the General Office in 1954, which he held until 1956) and as Minister of the Department of Rural Youth Work. In 1955, he enrolled for studies at the Central Party School.

== Work at Tsinghua ==
In 1956, Liu Bing was transferred to Tsinghua University. In May 1956, at the First Congress of the CCP at Tsinghua University, he was elected Deputy Secretary of the University Party Committee. From that time until the outbreak of the Cultural Revolution in 1966, Liu Bing served continuously as the First Deputy Secretary of the Tsinghua University Party Committee; in this capacity, he assisted the President and Party Secretary, Jiang Nanxiang, in overseeing the daily operations of the Party Committee, and during his tenure, he presided over the formulation of various regulations regarding Party affairs and student affairs. In February 1959, at the Second Congress of the CCP at Tsinghua University, Liu Bing delivered a work report on behalf of the university's First Party Committee. On May 5, 1962, the Third Congress of the CCP at Tsinghua University was convened to elect delegates to the Third Beijing Municipal Party Congress; in accordance with the quota allocated by the Beijing Municipal Committee of the Chinese Communist Party, the Congress elected 11 full delegates and 2 alternate delegates from Tsinghua University to attend the Beijing Municipal Party Congress, with Liu Bing receiving 263 votes—the highest tally among all candidates. In October 1962, the Fourth Congress of the CCP at Tsinghua University was convened, and Liu Bing once again delivered a work report on behalf of the University Party Committee.

== During the Cultural Revolution ==
Following the outbreak of the Cultural Revolution, Liu Bing was purged and subjected to brutal persecution; he was repeatedly singled out for public denunciation and physically assaulted. It was not until 1970 that he was "integrated" into the leadership team at Tsinghua University, serving as Deputy Secretary of the University Party Committee and Vice Chairman of the Revolutionary Committee.

During his tenure, Liu Bing steadfastly upheld his principles; regarding the children of certain veteran cadres who had not yet been politically rehabilitated, Liu Bing treated them all equally during the admissions process, practicing no discrimination. For instance, in a 2000 interview with *Sons and Daughters of China* magazine, Xi Jinping—the son of Xi Zhongxun—recalled how Liu Bing had granted him a special exception to attend Tsinghua University during his time in office: "Back then, when applying for university admission, Tsinghua had allocated two enrollment quotas to the Yan'an region, both of which were assigned to Yanchuan County. I listed Tsinghua as my first, second, and third choice; my attitude was: if you let me in, I'll go; if not, then forget it. The county authorities forwarded my application to the regional level, where leaders at the County Education Bureau courageously spoke up and championed my cause. The Tsinghua admissions officers present did not dare make a decision on their own and had to seek instructions from the university. This turned out to be a stroke of luck. The months of July, August, and September of 1975 coincided with the height of the so-called 'Right-Deviationist Reversal of Verdicts' trend. Neither Chi Qun nor Xie Jingyi was on campus at the time; Liu Bing was in charge, and he declared: 'Let him come.'" Consequently, the Tsinghua University Admissions Office requested that Xi Zhongxun's assigned workplace—the Luoyang Refractory Materials Factory, where he had been sent down for manual labor—issue an "informal certificate." This document stated: "Comrade Xi Zhongxun's case constitutes a 'contradiction among the people' and does not preclude his children from pursuing higher education or employment." It was only then that Xi Jinping was able to enroll at Tsinghua University. In 2002, when the Fujian Alumni Association of Universities Outside the Province and other organizations compiled the *Distinguished Doctors of Fujian* series, Xi Jinping contributed a piece titled "A Personal Account" to the first volume, in which he recounted in detail the twists and turns of his journey to gain admission to Tsinghua University.

In August and October 1975, Liu Bing, together with Hui Xianjun, Liu Yi'an, Lü Fangzheng, and others from the Tsinghua University Party Committee, co-authored two letters addressed to Deng Xiaoping—then Vice Chairman of the Chinese Communist Party—requesting that he forward them to Chairman of the Chinese Communist Party Mao Zedong. These letters exposed serious misconduct on the part of Chi Qun, Xie Jingyi, and others within the Tsinghua University Party Committee. This episode became known as the Liu Bing Petition Incident. However, the letters were denounced as "malicious accusations," and their authors were subjected to criticism. Consequently, the incident triggered a nationwide campaign launched by Mao Zedong to Counterattack the Right-Deviationist Reversal-of-Verdicts Trend; Deng Xiaoping and his associates were subsequently criticized, and the affair profoundly impacted the entire political landscape of China.

In 1978, Liu Bing was politically rehabilitated; later that same year, he was transferred to serve as Secretary of the Party Committee and President of Lanzhou University. At the time—shortly after the conclusion of the Cultural Revolution—Lanzhou University, like other universities across the country, was in a state of disrepair and in urgent need of reconstruction. Upon assuming office, Liu Bing immediately set about improving study and living conditions, achieving tangible results in a short time. During Liu Bing's tenure as Secretary of the Party Committee and President of Lanzhou University, Hu Jintao—a Tsinghua University alumnus and former political counselor—happened to be working at the Gansu Provincial Construction Commission; consequently, Hu frequently visited Lanzhou University to call upon his former senior leader from Tsinghua, Liu Bing. In 1979, Liu Bing was appointed Vice Governor of the Gansu Provincial People's Government. From 1981 onward, he successively held the positions of Deputy Secretary and Secretary-General of the Gansu Provincial Committee of the Chinese Communist Party, as well as Executive Deputy Secretary. In 1986, he became Chairman of the Standing Committee of the Gansu Provincial People's Congress. After 1988, Liu Bing served as a deputy to the 7th National People's Congress (NPC), holding various posts such as Vice Chairman and Advisor to the NPC Education, Science, Culture and Public Health Committee. He was successively elected as a delegate to the 12th and 13th National Congress of the Chinese Communist Party.

== Later Years ==
After retiring, Liu Bing returned to Tsinghua University on numerous occasions to attend events such as the launch ceremony for *The Biography of Jiang Nanxiang*. In June 2011, on the occasion of Tsinghua University's centenary and the 90th anniversary of the founding of the Communist Party, the university established the "Liu Bing Award" to recognize outstanding workers in Party-building and student affairs.

In his later years, Liu Bing authored *Stormy Years*, in which he acknowledged the errors he had committed during the Cultural Revolution and "expressed his sincere apologies."

== Death ==
On July 24, 2017, Liu Bing died from illness at Beijing Hospital at the age of 96.

On July 30, 2017, a farewell ceremony for Liu Bing was held at the Babaoshan Funeral Parlor in Beijing.

Wreaths were sent by the seven members of the Standing Committee of the Political Bureau of the CCP Central Committee—Xi Jinping, Li Keqiang, Zhang Dejiang, Yu Zhengsheng, Liu Yunshan, Wang Qishan and Zhang Gaoli; by the four members of the Political Bureau of the CCP Central Committee—Ma Kai, Liu Yandong, Zhang Chunxian, and Zhao Leji; by retired former members of the Standing Committee of the Political Bureau of the CCP Central Committee—including Hu Jintao, Li Peng, Zhu Rongji, Wen Jiabao, Song Ping (accompanied by his wife, Chen Shunyao), Li Lanqing, Zeng Qinghong, Wu Guanzheng and Li Changchun; as well as by leaders at various other levels.

== Works ==
- Liu Bing, *Stormy Years: Reminiscences of the "Cultural Revolution" at Tsinghua University*, Tsinghua University Press, 1998
  - Liu Bing, *Stormy Years: Tsinghua, 1964–1976*, Contemporary China Publishing House, 2008
  - Liu Bing, *Stormy Years: Tsinghua, 1964–1976*, Contemporary China Publishing House, 2010
- Liu Bing, *Collected Works of Liu Bing*, Gansu People's Publishing House, 2011

Preceded by Jiang Longji (vacant since 1966)	President of Lanzhou University; 1979-1982	Succeeded by Nie Dajiang
Party political offices
Preceded by Li Dengying	People's Congress Chairman of Gansu; 1986-1988	Succeeded by Xu Feiqing
