= Gansu Military District =

- 中国人民解放军甘肃省军区
- Founded: August 1949; 77 years ago
- Country: China
- Allegiance: Chinese Communist Party
- Type: Military district
- Role: Command and control
- Part of: People's Liberation Army
- Headquarters: Lanzhou, Gansu

Commanders
- Commander: Major general (shaojiang) Liu Jianwei
- Political Commisar: Major general (shaojiang) Pu Yongneng

Chinese name
- Simplified Chinese: 中国人民解放军甘肃省军区
- Traditional Chinese: 中國人民解放軍甘肅省軍區
Transcriptions
Standard Mandarin
- Hanyu Pinyin: Zhōngguó Rénmín Jiěfàngjūn Gānsùshěng Jūnqū

The Gansu Military District (Chinese: 中国人民解放军甘肃省军区; full name People's Liberation Army Gansu Military District or PLA Gansu Military District) is a military district of the National Defense Mobilization Department of the Central Military Commission in China.

== History ==
Gansu Military District was created in August 1949.

== Leaders ==
=== Commanders ===
Name (English)	Name (Chinese)	Tenure begins	Tenure ends	Note
Wang Shitai	王世泰	August 1949	March 1950	
Xu Guangda	许光达	March 1950	August 1950	
Wang Shitai	王世泰	August 1950	November 1954	
Xu Guozhen	徐国珍	May 1961	May 1965	
Zhan Danan	詹大南	June 1965	August 1969	
Zhang Zhong	张忠	August 1969	June 1975	
He Guangyu	何光宇	June 1975	July 1978	
Li Bin	李彬	July 1978	December 1984	
Zhou Yuechi	周越池	December 1984	June 1990	
Sun Cuiping	孙粹屏	June 1990	March 1993	
Liang Peizhen	梁培祯	June 1993	1995	
Zhao Shuanglong	赵拴龙	December 1997	May 2002	
Zhao Jianzhong	赵建中	May 2002	December 2004	
Chen Zhishu	陈知庶	December 2004	March 2014	
Liu Wanlong	刘万龙	March 2014	January 2018	
Wang Wenqing	王文清	January 2018	January 2023	
Liu Jianwei	刘建伟	January 2023		

=== Political commissars ===
Name (English)	Name (Chinese)	Tenure begins	Tenure ends	Note
Zhang Desheng	张德生	August 1949	March 1950	
Wang Shitai	王世泰	March 1950	August 1950	
Zhang Desheng	张德生	August 1950	September 1954	
Zhang Zhongliang	张仲良	May 1954	January 1961	
Wang Junzhi	王钧治	January 1961	May 1967	
Song Ping	宋平	June 1977	January 1981	
Feng Jixin	冯纪新	January 1981	March 1983	
Li Ziqi	李子奇	March 1983	March 1986	
Wang Haishan	王海山	May 1983	August 1985	
Wen Jingyi	温景义	August 1985	June 1990	
Li Zhong	李忠	June 1990	May 2000	
Li Tonghou	李统厚	May 2000	May 2005	
Liu Jukui	刘巨魁	May 2005	April 2010	
Fu Chuanyu	傅传玉	April 2010	May 2016	
Pu Yongneng	蒲永能	January 2017		
