= Gansu Provincial People's Government =

Provincial government in China

Gansu Provincial People's Government 甘肃省人民政府
- Established: January 8, 1950; 76 years ago

Leadership
- Governor: Kong Shaoxun; 2 September 2026
- Parent body: Central People's Government; Gansu Provincial People's Congress
- Elected by: Gansu Provincial People's Congress

Meeting place
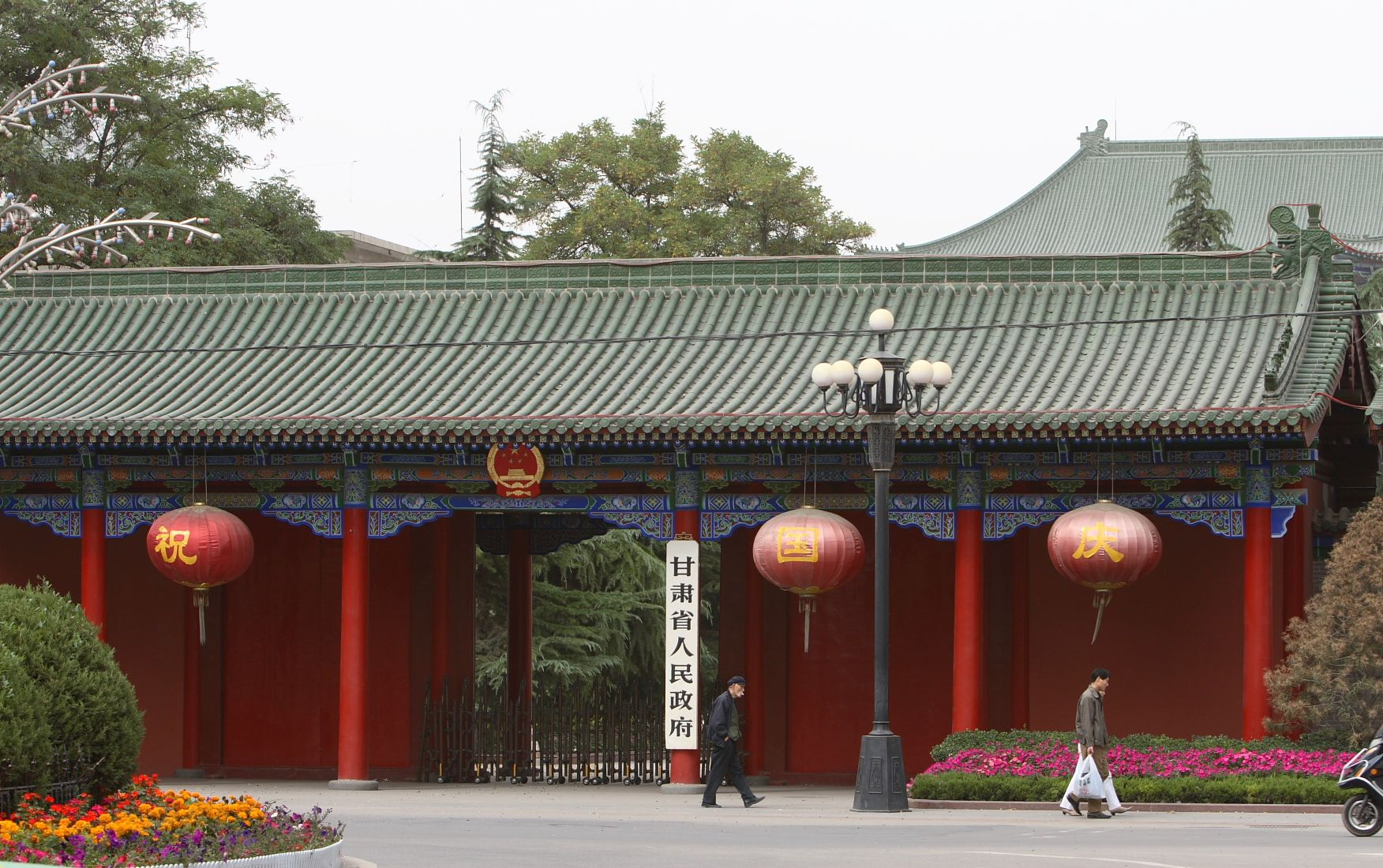
- Headquarters

Website
- www.gansu.gov.cn

The Gansu Provincial People's Government is the local administrative agency of Gansu. It is officially elected by the Gansu Provincial People's Congress and is formally responsible to the Gansu Provincial People's Congress and its Standing Committee. Under the country's one-party system, the governor is subordinate to the secretary of the Gansu Provincial Committee of the Chinese Communist Party. The Provincial government is headed by a governor, currently Kong Shaoxun.

== History ==
After the Battle of Lanzhou in August 1949, the People's Liberation Army captured Lanzhou, the capital of Gansu Province. On December 2, the fourth meeting of the Central People's Government approved the list of members of the Gansu Provincial People's Government. On December 9, Wang Zhiqi, the chairman of the Gansu Provincial Government and the commander of the 119th Army of the National Army, and Jiang Yuntai, the deputy commander, announced the "uprising" in Wudu County. The government of the People's Republic of China took over the entire Gansu Province.

On January 8, 1950, the Gansu Provincial People's Government was formally established. In October 1958, it was renamed the Gansu Provincial People's Committee. In 1968, it was renamed the Gansu Provincial Revolutionary Committee. In November 1979, the Gansu Provincial Revolutionary Committee was abolished and the Gansu Provincial People's Government was re-established.

== Organization ==
The organization of the Gansu Provincial People's Government includes:

- General Office of the Gansu Provincial People's Government

=== Component Departments ===
- Gansu Provincial Development and Reform Commission
- Gansu Provincial Department of Education
- Gansu Provincial Department of Science and Technology
- Gansu Provincial Department of Industry and Information Technology
- Gansu Provincial Ethnic Affairs Commission
- Gansu Provincial Public Security Department
- Gansu Provincial Department of Civil Affairs
- Gansu Provincial Department of Justice
- Gansu Provincial Department of Finance
- Gansu Provincial Department of Human Resources and Social Security
- Gansu Provincial Department of Natural Resources
- Gansu Provincial Department of Ecology and Environment
- Gansu Provincial Department of Housing and Urban-Rural Development
- Gansu Provincial Department of Transportation
- Gansu Provincial Water Resources Department
- Gansu Provincial Department of Agriculture and Rural Affairs
- Gansu Provincial Department of Commerce
- Gansu Provincial Department of Culture and Tourism
- Gansu Provincial Health Commission
- Gansu Provincial Department of Veterans Affairs
- Gansu Provincial Emergency Management Department
- Gansu Provincial Audit Office
- Foreign Affairs Office of Gansu Provincial People's Government

=== Directly affiliated special institution ===
- State-owned Assets Supervision and Administration Commission of Gansu Provincial People's Government

=== Organizations under the government ===
- Gansu Provincial Forestry and Grassland Bureau
- Gansu Provincial Market Supervision Administration
- Gansu Provincial Radio and Television Bureau
- Gansu Provincial Sports Bureau
- Gansu Provincial Bureau of Statistics
- Gansu Provincial People's Government Research Office
- Gansu Provincial National Defense Mobilization Office
- Gansu Provincial Local Financial Administration Bureau
- Gansu Provincial Government Affairs Bureau
- Gansu Provincial Bureau of Letters and Calls
- Gansu Provincial Rural Revitalization Bureau
- Gansu Provincial Medical Insurance Bureau (Deputy Department Level)

=== Departmental management organization ===
- The Advisory Office of the Gansu Provincial People's Government is managed by the General Office of the Provincial Government.
- The Gansu Provincial Bureau of Grain and Material Reserves is managed by the Provincial Development and Reform Commission.
- The Gansu Provincial Prison Administration Bureau is managed by the Provincial Department of Justice.
- The Gansu Provincial Animal Husbandry and Veterinary Bureau is managed by the Provincial Department of Agriculture and Rural Affairs.
- The Gansu Provincial Cultural Relics Bureau is managed by the Provincial Department of Culture and Tourism.
- The Gansu Provincial Drug Administration is managed by the Provincial Market Supervision Bureau.

=== Directly affiliated institutions ===
- Gansu Provincial People's Government Literature and History Research Institute
- Gansu Provincial Local History Office
- Gansu Academy of Social Sciences
- Gansu Academy of Sciences
- Gansu Academy of Agricultural Sciences
- Gansu Provincial Supply and Marketing Cooperatives Federation
- Gansu Province Yinda Ruqin Project Management Bureau
- Gansu Provincial Public Resources Trading Bureau
- Gansu Radio and Television Station
- Gansu Nonferrous Metals Geological Exploration Bureau

=== Dispatched agencies ===
- Lanzhou New District Management Committee
- Gansu Provincial People's Government Office in Beijing

The Lanzhou New District Administrative Committee and the Lanzhou New District Working Committee of the CCP share the same office.

== See also ==
- Politics of Gansu
  - Gansu Provincial People's Congress
  - Gansu Provincial People's Government
    - Governor of Gansu
  - Gansu Provincial Committee of the Chinese Communist Party
    - Party Secretary of Gansu
  - Gansu Provincial Committee of the Chinese People's Political Consultative Conference
