= Gansu Provincial Committee of the Chinese People's Political Consultative Conference =

Gansu Provincial Committee of the Chinese People's Political Consultative Conference 中国人民政治协商会议甘肃省委员会
- 12th
- Emblem of the Chinese People's Political Consultative Conference

Type
- Type: United front organ Constitutional convention (Historical); Legislature (Historical) of Chinese People's Political Consultative Conference

History
- Founded: February 1955; 71 years ago
- Preceded by: Gansu Provincial People's Congress Consultative Committee

Leadership
- Chairperson: Zhuang Guotai

Website
- www.gszx.gov.cn

Chinese name
- Simplified Chinese: 中国人民政治协商会议甘肃省委员会
- Traditional Chinese: 中國人民政治協商會議甘肅省委員會
Transcriptions
Standard Mandarin
- Hanyu Pinyin: Zhōngguó Rénmín Zhèngzhì Xiéshāng Huìyì Gānsùshěng Wěiyuánhuì

Abbreviation
- Simplified Chinese: 甘肃省政协
- Traditional Chinese: 甘肅省政協
- Literal meaning: CPPCC Gansu Provincial Committee
Transcriptions
Standard Mandarin
- Hanyu Pinyin: Gānsùshěng Zhèngxié

The Gansu Provincial Committee of the Chinese People's Political Consultative Conference (Chinese: 中国人民政治协商会议甘肃省委员会; abbreviation CPPCC Gansu Provincial Committee) is the provincial advisory body and a local organization of the Chinese People's Political Consultative Conference in Gansu, China. It is supervised and directed by the Gansu Provincial Committee of the Chinese Communist Party.

== History ==
The Gansu Provincial Committee of the Chinese People's Political Consultative Conference traces its origins to the Gansu Provincial People's Congress Consultative Committee (甘肃省各界人民代表会议协商委员会), founded in 1950.

== Term ==
=== 1st ===
- Term: February 1955–December 1959
- Chairperson: Zhang Zhongliang
- Vice Chairpersons: Yang Shenzhi, Gao Jianjun, Wang Gengshan (February 1955–May 1959), Dalizhaya (February 1955–1958), Ma Teng'ai (February 1955–1958), Ma Dunjing, Xu Zongru (February 1955–1958), Zhou Xiangchu (November 1956–December 1959), Yang Ziheng (November 1956–December 1957), Zheng Zhongyuan (November 1956–December 1959), Huang Xiang (February 1955–1957)
- Secretary General: Meng Dingjun

=== 2nd ===
- Term: December 1959–September 1964
- Chairperson: Zhang Zhongliang (December 1959–August 1961), Wang Shitai (August 1961–September 1964)
- Vice Chairpersons: Gao Jianjun, Ma Dunjing, Zhou Xiangchu, Wu Hongbin, Huang Zhengqing, Meng Dingjun, Fan Zhenxu (December 1959–September 1960), Zhao Yuanzhen, Zheng Zhongyuan
- Secretary General: Meng Dingjun

=== 3rd ===
- Term: September 1964–1966
- Chairperson: Gao Jianjun
- Vice Chairpersons: Sun Diancai, Ma Dunjing, Zhou Xiangchu, Wu Hongbin, Meng Dingjun, Zhao Yuanzhen, Yang Chengzhong, Huang Zhengqing
- Secretary General: Meng Hao

=== 4th ===
- Term: December 1977–April 1983
- Chairperson: Wang Shitai (December 1977–December 1979), Yang Zhilin (December 1979–April 1983)
- Vice Chairpersons: Li Fangyuan, Li Peifu, Lan Wenzhao, Wu Hongbin, Zhu Shengda, Xie Songbai, Ding Naiguang (December 1977–April 1981), Meng Dingjun (December 1977–January 1979), Wang Shijie, Yang Chengzhong, Huang Zhengqing, Li Keru, Lu Zhongliang, Yan Shutang, Wang Xiaoci (December 1979–April 1983), Zheng Zhongyuan (December 1979–April 1983), Mu Shengzhong (December 1979–April 1983), Lei Enjun (December 1979–April 1983), Wu Song (December 1979–April 1983), Yang Hanlie (December 1979–April 1983), Lu Weigong (December 1979–April 1983), Luo Shiyu (December 1980–April 1983), Wang Zhiyun (December 1980–April 1983), Jamyang Lobsang Jigme Tubdan Chokyi Nyima (December 1980–April 1983), Ma Chongyong (December 1980–April 1983), Li Ziqin (December 1982–April 1983)
- Secretary General: Lu Weigong (December 1977–December 1979), Wang Dengyu (December 1979–December 1980)
- Acting Secretary General: Wang Shanggan (December 1980–April 1983)

=== 5th ===
- Term: April 1983–January 1988
- Chairperson: Huang Luobin (April 1983–March 1984), Wang Bingxiang (April 1984–January 1988)
- Vice Chairpersons: Huang Zhengqing, Wu Hongbin, Wang Shijie (April 1983–May 1986), Yang Chengzhong, Lu Zhongliang, Yan Shutang, Yang Hanlie (April 1983–July 1987), Jamyang Lobsang Jigme Tubdan Chokyi Nyima, Ma Chongyong, Wang Guorui (April 1983–May 1985), Liu Dechen, Jiang Yuntai, Ma Zuling (March 1984–January 1988), Liang Dajun (March 1984–May 1986), Zhu Xuanren (March 1984–January 1988), Gongtangcang Danbei Wangxu (March 1984–January 1988), Qin Shiwei (May 1985–January 1988), Cui Guoquan (April 1987–January 1988)
- Secretary General: Lu Kejian (April 1983–March 1984), Sha Lishi (March 1984–May 1985), Qin Shiwei (concurrently, May 1985–April 1987), Mu Yongji (April 1987–January 1988)

=== 6th ===
- Term: January 1988–January 1993
- Chairperson: Ge Shiying
- Vice Chairpersons: Huang Zhengqing, Wu Hongbin (January 1988–February 1988), Ma Zuling, Lu Zhongliang (January 1988–March 1988), Yan Shutang, Jamyang Lobsang Jigme Tubdan Chokyi Nyima, Ma Chongyong (January 1988–February 1990), Zhu Xuanren, Gongtangcang Danbei Wangxu, Qin Shiwei, Cui Guoquan, Shen Xiaozeng (March 1989–January 1993), Li Zhong (March 1989–January 1993), Chen Jianhong (March 1989–January 1993), Ying Zhongyi (March 1992–January 1993)
- Secretary General: Cui Guoquan (concurrently, January 1988–March 1989), Xu Shanghe (March 1989–January 1993)

=== 7th ===
- Term: January 1993–January 1998
- Chairperson: Shen Xiaozeng
- Vice Chairpersons: Huang Zhengqing, Li Zhong (January 1993–February 1996), Han Zhengqing, Zhu Xuanren, Gongtangcang Danbei Wangxu, Wang Ping, Chen Jianhong, Ying Zhongyi, Du Dashi, Bai Yufeng (April 1994–January 1998), Deng Chengcheng (February 1996–January 1998)
- Secretary General: Xu Shanghe

=== 8th ===
- Term: January 1998–January 2003
- Chairperson: Yang Zhenjie
- Vice Chairpersons: Gongtangcang Danbei Wangxu (January 1998–March 2000), Chen Jianhong, Bai Yufeng, Deng Chengcheng, Zhu Zuoyong, Du Ying, La Minzhi, Yang Zhengang, Zhou Yixing, Li Yuhong
- Secretary General: Xue Yingcheng

=== 9th ===
- Term: January 2003–January 2008
- Chairperson: Zhong Zhaolong
- Vice Chairpersons: Chen Jianhong, Bai Yufeng, Cui Zhenghua, Zhu Zuoyong (January 2003–June 2007), La Minzhi, Chen Xueheng (January 2007–January 2008), Lobsang Lhinzhi Dorje (January 2007–January 2008), Yang Zhengang, Zhou Yixing, Li Yuhong, Huang Yichun, Dewacang Jamyang Thubten Thargye Gyatso, Yu Zheng, Wei Zhenzhong
- Secretary General: Xue Yingcheng

=== 10th ===
- Term: January 2008–January 2013
- Chairperson: Chen Xueheng (January 2008–January 2011), Feng Jianshen (January 2011–January 2013)
- Vice Chairpersons: Shao Kewen (January 2008–January 2011), Dewacang Jamyang Thubten Thargye Gyatso, Zhang Jinliang, Li Yongjun, Hou Shenghua, Huang Xuanping, Li Zhenya, Zhang Shizhen, Ma Guoyu, Zhang Jinghui (January 2011–January 2013)
- Secretary General: Shi Jing

=== 11th ===
- Term: January 2013–January 2018
- Chairperson: Feng Jianshen
- Vice Chairpersons: Dewacang Jamyang Thubten Thargye Gyatso, Liu Lijun (January 2013–January 2017), Zhang Jinliang (January 2013–January 2017), Huang Xuanping, Li Zhenya, Zhang Shizhen, Zhang Jinghui (January 2013–January 2017), Li Peiwen, Ma Wenyun
- Secretary General: Shi Jing (January 2013–January 2015), Chen Wei (January 2015–January 2018)

=== 12th ===
- Term: January 2018–January 2023
- Chairperson: Ouyang Jian
- Vice Chairpersons: Dewacang Jamyang Thubten Thargye Gyatso, Hao Yuan (January 2018–January 2021), Chen Qing (January 2020–), Ma Wenyun, Wang Rui, Guo Chenglu, Kang Guoxi, Shang Xunwu, Yun Jianmin, Guo Tiankang, Huo Weiping (January 2021–)
- Secretary General: Chen Wei (January 2018–January 2020), Wang Jiantai (January 2020–)

=== 13th ===
- Term: January 2023–2028
- Chairperson: Zhuang Guotai
- Vice Chairpersons: He Wei, Ma Wenyun, Wang Rui, Guo Chenglu, Shang Xunwu, Yun Jianmin, Guo Tiankang, Huo Weiping, Liu Zhongkui
- Secretary General: Wang Jiantai
