= Lu Hao (politician, born 1947) =

Chinese politician

- 陆浩
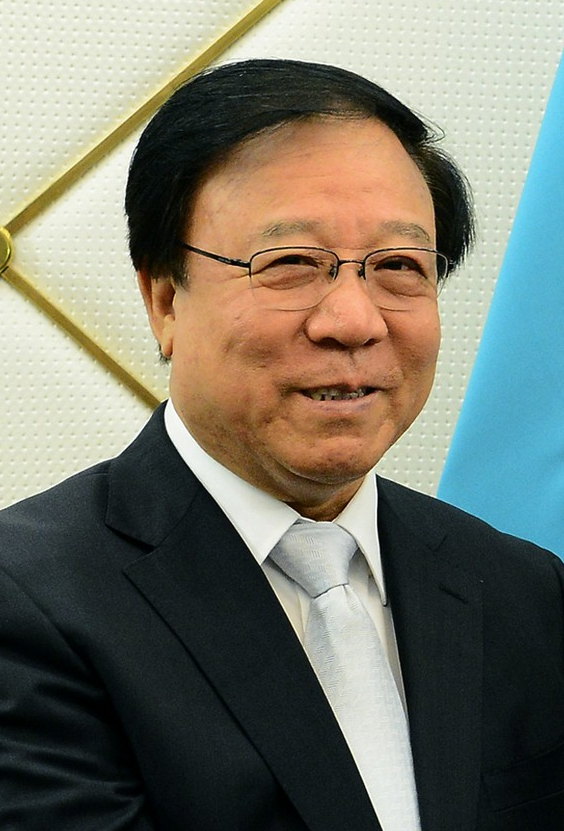
- Lu Hao in 2015

Chairperson of the Environmental Protection and Resources Conservation Committee of the National People's Congress
- In office March 2013 – March 2018
- Preceded by: Wang Guangtao
- Succeeded by: Gao Hucheng

Party Secretary of Gansu
- In office June 2006 – December 2011
- Preceded by: Su Rong
- Succeeded by: Wang Sanyun

Chairperson of the Gansu Provincial People's Congress
- In office January 2007 – December 2011
- Preceded by: Su Rong
- Succeeded by: Wang Sanyun

Governor of Gansu
- In office January 2001 – October 2006
- Preceded by: Song Zhaosu
- Succeeded by: Xu Shousheng

Personal details
- Born: April 1947 (age 79) Changli County, Hebei, China
- Party: Chinese Communist Party
- Education: Lanzhou University; Dalian University of Technology

Chinese name
- Simplified Chinese: 陆浩
- Traditional Chinese: 陸浩
Transcriptions
Standard Mandarin
- Hanyu Pinyin: Lù Hào

Lu Hao (Chinese: 陆浩; pinyin: Lù Hào; born April 1947) is a Chinese politician. He served as Party Secretary of Gansu from 2007 to 2011.

== Biography ==
Lu was born in Changli County, Hebei. He held the post of Governor of Gansu from 2001 to 2007. He was first appointed to be Party Secretary of Gansu in April 2007. He retired from active politics in December 2011, aged 64, and since then has sat on the Standing Committee of the National People's Congress.

Government offices
Preceded by Song Zhaosu	Governor of Gansu; 2001–2007	Succeeded by Xu Shousheng
Party political offices
Preceded by Yang Zhenjie	Head of the Organization Department of Gansu Provincial Committee of the Chinese Communist Party; 1993–1996	Succeeded by Yang Limin
Preceded by Li Hulin	Party Secretary of Lanzhou; 1996–1999	Succeeded by Zhang Qingli
Preceded by Su Rong	Party Secretary of Gansu; 2007–2011	Succeeded by Wang Sanyun
Assembly seats
Preceded by Su Rong	Chairperson of the Gansu Provincial People's Congress; 2007–2011	Succeeded by Wang Sanyun
Preceded by Wang Guangtao	Chairperson of the Environmental Protection and Resources Conservation Committee of the National People's Congress; 2013–2018	Succeeded by Gao Hucheng
