= Governor of Gansu =

Local leadership position in Gansu, China

Governor of the Gansu Provincial People's Government
- 甘肃省人民政府省长
- National Emblem of China

- Flag of China
- Incumbent; Kong Shaoxun since 2 September 2026
- Gansu Provincial People's Government
- Type: Governor
- Status: Provincial and ministerial-level official
- Reports to: Gansu Provincial People's Congress and its Standing Committee
- Nominator: Presidium of the Gansu Provincial People's Congress
- Appointer: Gansu Provincial People's Congress
- Term length: Five years, renewable
- Inaugural holder: Wang Shitai
- Formation: July 1949
- Deputy: Deputy Governors; Secretary-General

The governor of Gansu, officially the Governor of the Gansu Provincial People's Government, is the head of Gansu Province and leader of the Gansu Provincial People's Government.

The governor is elected by the Gansu Provincial People's Congress, and responsible to it and its Standing Committee. The governor is a provincial level official and is responsible for the overall decision-making of the provincial government. The governor is assisted by an executive vice governor as well as several vice governors. The governor generally serves as the deputy secretary of the Gansu Provincial Committee of the Chinese Communist Party and as a member of the CCP Central Committee. The governor is the second highest-ranking official in the province after the secretary of the CCP Gansu Committee. The current governor is Kong Shaoxun, who took office on 2 September 2026.

== List of governors ==
=== People's Republic of China ===
No.	Officeholder	Term of office		Party	Ref.
No.	Officeholder	Took office	Left office	Party	Ref.
Governor of the Gansu Provincial People's Government
1	Wang Shitai (1910–2008)	July 1949	January 1950	Chinese Communist Party	
2	Deng Baoshan (1894–1968)	January	December 1954	Chinese Communist Party	
Governor of the Gansu Provincial People's Committee
(2)	Deng Baoshan (1894–1968)	December 1954	May 1967	Chinese Communist Party	
Director of the Gansu Revolutionary Committee
3	Xian Henghan (1911–1991)	May 1967	January 1977	Chinese Communist Party	
4	Song Ping (1917–2026)	June 1977	December 1979	Chinese Communist Party	
Governor of the Gansu Provincial People's Government
5	Feng Jixin (1915–2005)	December 1979	January 1981	Chinese Communist Party	
6	Li Dengying (1914–1996)	January 1981	April 1983	Chinese Communist Party	
7	Chen Guangyi (born 1933)	April 1983	May 1986	Chinese Communist Party	
8	Jia Zhijie (born 1935)	May 1986	January 1993	Chinese Communist Party	
9	Yan Haiwang (born 1939)	January 1993	September 1993	Chinese Communist Party	
10	Zhang Wule (born 1937)	September 1993	July 1996	Chinese Communist Party	
11	Sun Ying (1936–2025)	July 1996	April 1998	Chinese Communist Party	
12	Song Zhaosu (1941–2022)	April 1998	January 2001	Chinese Communist Party	
13	Lu Hao (born 1947)	January 2001	October 2006	Chinese Communist Party	
14	Xu Shousheng (1953–2020)	30 October 2006	29 July 2010	Chinese Communist Party	
15	Liu Weiping (born 1953)	29 July 2010	1 April 2016	Chinese Communist Party	
16	Lin Duo (born 1956)	1 April 2016	11 April 2017	Chinese Communist Party	
17	Tang Renjian (born 1962)	11 April 2017	3 December 2020	Chinese Communist Party	
18	Ren Zhenhe (born 1964)	3 December 2020	2 September 2026	Chinese Communist Party	
19	Kong Shaoxun (born 1969)	2 September 2026	Incumbent		
