= Lu Feng =

Lu Feng may refer to:

- Lu Feng (footballer)
- Lu Feng (actor)
- Lu Feng (wrestler)
- Lu Feng (politician)
