= Xuejian =

Xuejian or Xue Jian is the Mandarin Pinyin spelling of a Chinese given name.

People with this name include:

== Real people ==
- Xue Jian (薛剑, born 1968), Chinese diplomat
- Xue Jian (薛堅), governor of Mingzhou, Tang dynasty, grandson of Xue Ne, son of Xue Zhi (薛直) (died 793)
- Han Xuejian (born 1961), former Chinese politician
- Li Xuejian (born 1954), Chinese actor
- Yang Xuejian (杨学建), American actor who cast as Mr. Li in the American comedy-drama film The Farewell
- Zheng Xuejian (born 2001), Chinese footballer

== Fictional characters ==
- Tang Xuejian (唐雪見), a character in the video game by Softstar Entertainment Chinese Paladin 3 and the same title television series

== See also ==
- Chinese given name
- Jian (disambiguation)
- Xue
