= Chen Junwu =

Chinese engineer (1927–2024)

- 陈俊武
- Born: March 17, 1927; Beijing, China
- Died: 1 May 2024 (aged 97); Luoyang, Henan, China
- Education: Peking University
- Spouse: Wu Ningfang
- Children: 2
- Scientific career
- Fields: Oil-refinery engineering
- Workplaces: Luoyang Petrochemical Engineering Corporation Ltd

Chinese name
- Traditional Chinese: 陳俊武
- Simplified Chinese: 陈俊武
Transcriptions
Standard Mandarin
- Hanyu Pinyin: Chén Jùnwǔ

Chen Junwu (Chinese: 陈俊武; March 17, 1927 – May 1, 2024) was a Chinese engineer and an academician of the Chinese Academy of Sciences (CAS).

== Biography ==
Chen was born in Beijing, on March 17, 1927, while his ancestral home in Changle, Fujian. His father Chen Xunchang, a graduate from Waseda University, was a politician in late Qing dynasty and early Republic of China. He is the younger brother of Chen Shunyao ( the wife of Song Ping ) and brother in law of Song Ping. He attended Chongde Middle School (now Beijing No.31 High School). In 1944 he was accepted to Peking University, majoring in the Department of Applied Chemistry, where he graduated in 1948.

In December 1949 he became a technician at the Artificial Oil Factory of Fushun Mining Bureau (later renamed as the 3rd Petroleum Factory). He joined the Chinese Communist Party (CCP) in April 1956. That same year he was transferred to the Fushun Design Institute of the Ministry of Petroleum Industry. Three years later, he was appointed an architect at Datong Coal Refinery Plant. In 1969, he moved with Fushun Design Institute to Zhangwu Township of Yiyang County in central China's Henan province. In 1982 he joined Sinopec. In 1985, Luoyang Refinery Design and Research Institute was renamed Luoyang Petrochemical Engineering Company, and he transitioned from being the institute's dean to serving as its manager. In 1992, he was selected as a representative of the 14th National Congress of the Chinese Communist Party. On 7 October 2019, he was granted the title "Role Model of the Times" by the Publicity Department of the Chinese Communist Party.

In 2018, Chen Junwu's biography was published, written by Zhang Wenxin (张文欣), a well known Luoyang-based author. He was absent to attend the funeral of his elder sister Chen Shunyao on August 3. 2019.

Chen died in Luoyang, Henan, on 1 May 2024, at the age of 97. In 2026, He was awarded the July 1 Medal posthumously.

== Family ==
Chen married Wu Ningfang (吴凝芳) and the couple had two daughters, Chen Ling (陈玲) and Chen Xin (陈欣). Chen Shunyao is his older sister.

== Honours and awards ==
- 1985 National Labor Medal
- 1985 State Science and Technology Progress Award (First Class) for the 500000 tons/year coaxial catalytic cracking unit at Lanzhou Refinery
- 1987 State Science and Technology Progress Award (First Class) for catalytic cracking engineering technology.
- 1991 Member of the Chinese Academy of Sciences (CAS)
- 2014 State Technological Invention Award (First Class) for methanol to low carbon olefins (DMTO) technology.
- 2019 "Role Model of the Times" (时代楷模)
- 2026 July 1 Medal
