= Feng Jixin =

Chinese politician

Feng Jixin (Chinese: 冯纪新) (1915–2005) was a Chinese politician. He was born in Jinzhai County, Anhui Province. A member of the New Fourth Army during the Second Sino-Japanese War, he was sent to Nenjiang Province (now part of Heilongjiang Province) in 1945. He was governor of Gansu (December 1979 – January 1981) and Chinese Communist Party Committee Secretary of Gansu (January 1981 – September 1982).

Government offices
Preceded by Song Ping	Governor of Gansu; 1979–1981	Succeeded by Li Dengying
Party political offices
Preceded by Song Ping	Party Secretary of Gansu; 1981–1982	Succeeded by Li Ziqi
Military offices
Preceded by Song Ping	Political Commissar of the Gansu Military District; 1981–1983	Succeeded by Li Ziqi
