= Chen Shunyao =

Chinese politician and academic administrator (1917–2019)

- Born: September 1917; Jinan, Shandong, China
- Died: 31 July 2019 (aged 101); Beijing, China
- Education: Tsinghua University
- Occupations: Politician, academic administrator
- Political party: Chinese Communist Party
- Spouse: Song Ping
- Children: 2
- Relatives: Chen Junwu (brother)

Chinese name
- Traditional Chinese: 陳舜瑤
- Simplified Chinese: 陈舜瑶
Transcriptions
Standard Mandarin
- Hanyu Pinyin: Chén Shùnyáo
- Wade–Giles: Ch'ên^{2} Shun^{4}-yao^{2}

Chen Shunyao (Chinese: 陈舜瑶; September 1917 – 31 July 2019) was a Chinese politician and academic administrator. She served as deputy party secretary of Tsinghua University, and was a delegate to the First and Third National People's Congresses. She was the wife of the high-ranking Chinese Communist Party (CCP) leader Song Ping, a former member of the CCP Politburo Standing Committee.

== Republic of China ==
Chen was born in September 1917 in Jinan, Shandong, Republic of China, with her ancestral home in Fuzhou, Fujian. In September 1936, she entered the Department of Civil Engineering of Tsinghua University, where she met her future husband Song Ping, a chemistry student and activist in the December 9th Movement against Japanese aggression in China.

When the Second Sino-Japanese War broke out in 1937 and the Japanese army occupied Beijing, Chen and Song evacuated with Tsinghua University to Changsha in southern China, where she joined the Chinese Communist Party (CCP) in December 1937. She later went with Song to the CCP headquarters in Yan'an. She studied at the CCP Central Party School and worked as Zhou Enlai's secretary in 1939.

In 1940, the CCP sent Chen as a representative to the Kuomintang government in China's wartime capital Chongqing, and later Nanjing after the end of World War II. When the Chinese Civil War broke out, she was transferred to the CCP-held area in Northeast China, where she worked in education, including a stint as the principal of Harbin Girls' High School.

== People's Republic of China ==
After the founding of the People's Republic of China, she returned to Tsinghua University in 1953. She worked for the next eight years at the university, successively as deputy dean, assistant president, and deputy party secretary. Future CCP general secretary and paramount leader Hu Jintao, then a Tsinghua student, was a protégé of hers and later promoted by her husband Song Ping.

In 1961, she was transferred to Northwest China and served as vice minister of propaganda of Gansu Province. She returned to Beijing in 1981, and worked in the Research Office of the Secretariat of the Chinese Communist Party until her retirement in 1988.

Chen was a delegate to the 1st National People's Congress in 1954 and participated in drafting the first Constitution of the People's Republic of China. She was also a delegate to the 3rd National People's Congress and the 7th Chinese People's Political Consultative Conference (CPPCC).

== Personal life ==
Chen's younger brother, Chen Junwu, was a petroleum chemist and an academician of the Chinese Academy of Sciences.

Chen died on 31 July 2019 in Beijing, at the age of 101 from lung cancer. Her funeral was held on 3 August 2019. She was buried at Babaoshan Revolutionary Cemetery in Beijing near her parents, two brothers and four sisters.
