= Xian Henghan =

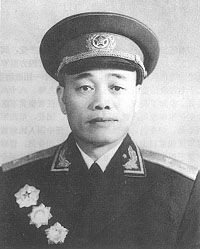

Xian Henghan (Chinese: 冼恒汉) (September 30, 1911 – November 19, 1991) was a Chinese politician and a lieutenant general of the People's Liberation Army. He was ethnically a member of the Zhuang people and born in Tianyang County, Guangxi. He participated in the Baise Uprising of November 1929 and later joined the Chinese Red Army. He was Chinese Communist Party Committee Secretary and governor of Gansu until his dismissal in 1977. He died in Lanzhou.

Preceded by Deng Baoshan	Governor of Gansu; 1968–1977	Succeeded by Song Ping
Preceded by Hu Jizong	Party Secretary of Gansu; 1974–1977	Succeeded by Song Ping
