= Lu Kejian =

Chinese politician (1932–2026)

Lu Kejian (Chinese: 卢克俭; 1932 – 12 January 2026) was an ethnic Tibetan Chinese politician.

== Early life ==
In 1932, Lu was born in Jonê County, Gansu province, China.

== Career ==
Lu started his political career as leader of the Bairi Tibetan Autonomous County in his home province. He served as People's Congress Chairman of his home province. He was a delegate to the 7th National People's Congress, 8th National People's Congress (1993–1998) and the 9th National People's Congress (1998–2003).

Preceded by Xu Feiqing	People's Congress Chairman of Gansu	Succeeded by Song Zhaosu
