= Zhang Quanjing =

Chinese politician (1931–2022)

- 张全景

Head of the Organization Department of the Chinese Communist Party
- In office October 1994 – March 1999
- General Secretary: Jiang Zemin
- Preceded by: Lü Feng
- Succeeded by: Zeng Qinghong

Personal details
- Born: December 1931 Pingyuan County, Shandong, China
- Died: 8 November 2022 (aged 90) Beijing, China
- Party: Chinese Communist Party

Chinese name
- Simplified Chinese: 张全景
- Traditional Chinese: 張全景
Transcriptions
Standard Mandarin
- Hanyu Pinyin: Zhāng Quánjǐng

Zhang Quanjing (Chinese: 张全景; December 1931 – 8 November 2022) was a Chinese politician who served as head of the Organization Department of the Chinese Communist Party from 1994 to 1999.

Zhang was a member of the Standing Committee of the 8th and 9th Chinese People's Political Consultative Conference. He was a representative of the 13th, 14th, and 15th National Congress of the Chinese Communist Party.

== Early life and education ==
Zhang was born in Pingyuan County, Shandong, in December 1931.

== Political career ==
Zhang joined the revolution in February 1946 and joined the Chinese Communist Party (CCP) in September 1949.

Zhang taught at schools before getting involved in politics. He was head of the Organization Department of the CCP Shandong Provincial Committee in June 1985 and subsequently secretary of the Shandong Provincial Commission for Discipline Inspection in December 1988.

In December 1991, Zhang became deputy head of the Organization Department of the Chinese Communist Party, rising to head in October 1994.

On 8 November 2022, Zhang died in Beijing, at the age of 90.

Party political offices
Preceded by Lü Feng	Head of the Organization Department of the Chinese Communist Party; 1994–1999	Succeeded by Zeng Qinghong
