= Xu Shousheng =

Chinese politician (1953–2020)

- 徐守盛

Vice Chair of the National People's Congress Agriculture and Rural Affairs Committee
- In office 3 September 2016 – 5 December 2020
- Chair: Chen Jianguo

Party Secretary of Hunan
- In office 20 March 2013 – 28 August 2016
- Preceded by: Zhou Qiang
- Succeeded by: Du Jiahao

Chairman of the Standing Committee of the Hunan People's Congress
- In office May 2013 – January 2017
- Preceded by: Zhou Qiang
- Succeeded by: Du Jiahao

Governor of Hunan
- In office 5 June 2010 – 10 April 2013
- Preceded by: Zhou Qiang
- Succeeded by: Du Jiahao

Governor of Gansu
- In office 30 October 2006 – 29 July 2010
- Preceded by: Lu Hao
- Succeeded by: Liu Weiping

Personal details
- Born: 23 January 1953 Rudong County, Jiangsu, China
- Died: December 5, 2020 (aged 67) Nanjing, Jiangsu, China
- Party: Chinese Communist Party
- Education: Southeast University

Xu Shousheng (Chinese: 徐守盛; pinyin: Xú Shǒushèng; 23 January 1953 – 5 December 2020) was a Chinese politician. He was the Party Secretary of Hunan from 2013 to 2016. He served as the governor of Hunan and Gansu provinces.

== Biography ==
Xu was born in Rudong County, Jiangsu. He joined the Chinese Communist Party in October 1973, and is an alumnus of Southeast University, though it is not clear when he graduated. He began working for the party in the grassroots, first as a commune leader, then head of the revolutionary committee of his home township, then deputy governor of his home county. In October 1985, he became county governor of Rudong, then in 1990 was elevated to party chief. In December 1991 he became mayor of Lianyungang, and in July 1996, became party chief of Suqian, the first person to hold this position after Suqian was established as a prefecture-level city. He entered the Jiangsu provincial party standing committee in December 2000, ascending to sub-provincial level at the age of 47; he oversaw poverty reduction and rural affairs work.

He was transferred from Jiangsu to Gansu in September 2001 when he was appointed to head the Gansu provincial organization department. In January 2003 he was named executive vice governor of Gansu. Xu Shousheng was then appointed as Governor of Hunan in January 2007. He was re-elected by the Gansu Provincial People's Congress on January 26, 2008.

As Governor of Gansu, Xu was responsible for the personnel, environmental, economic, political and foreign policy of the province. The Governorship ranks second in the province behind the Chinese Communist Party Provincial Committee Secretary. In 2013, he became provincial party chief. In August 2016, he was relieved of his position as party chief of Hunan. On September 3, 2016, he was appointed a vice chair of the National People's Congress Agriculture and Rural Affairs Committee.

He died of illness in Nanjing on December 5, 2020.

Party political offices
New title	Party Secretary of Suqian; 1996-2001	Next: Qiu He
Previous: Wang Anshun	Head of Organization Department of Gansu Provincial Committee of the Chinese Communist Party; 2001-2003	Next: Wang Xiankui (王宪奎)
Previous: Zhou Qiang	Party Secretary of Hunan; 2013–2016	Next: Du Jiahao
Government offices
Previous: Wang Wenqing (王稳卿)	Mayor of Lianyungang; 1992-1996	Next: Xia Geng
Previous: Guo Kun	Executive Vice Governor of Gansu; 2003-2006	Next: Yang Zhiming
Previous: Zhou Qiang	Governor of Hunan; 2010–2013	Next: Du Jiahao
Previous: Lu Hao	Governor of Gansu; 2007–2010	Next: Liu Weiping
Assembly seats
Previous: Zhou Qiang	Chairman of the Standing Committee of the Hunan People's Congress; 2013-2017	Next: Du Jiahao
