= Wang Sanyun =

Chinese politician

- 王三运

Party Secretary of Gansu
- In office December 2011 – March 2017
- Preceded by: Lu Hao
- Succeeded by: Lin Duo

Governor of Anhui
- In office December 2007 – December 2011
- Preceded by: Wang Jinshan
- Succeeded by: Li Bin

Personal details
- Born: December 1952 (age 73) Guizhou, China
- Party: Chinese Communist Party (1979–2017, expelled)
- Education: Guizhou Teacher's College

Wang Sanyun (Chinese: 王三运; born December 1952) is a former Chinese politician. He began his political career in Guizhou province, before serving in Sichuan, Fujian, and Anhui provinces. He served as the governor of Anhui between 2007 and 2011, and was transferred to Gansu to serve as Chinese Communist Party Committee Secretary between 2011 and 2017. Shortly after leaving office, he was put under investigation for violating party discipline by the Central Commission for Discipline Inspection.

== Early career ==
Wang was born in Guizhou. He traces his ancestry to Shan County in Shandong Province; his name means roughly "Three Transports". As a teenager, he had performed manual labour in Zhijin County, Guizhou, before becoming a middle school teacher there. In August 1974, he was admitted to Guiyang Teacher's College (now Guizhou Normal University) as a worker-peasant-soldier student. He joined the Chinese Communist Party, a prerequisite for political office, in 1979. His first political assignment was with the Organization Department of the Guizhou party committee.

He successively served as the party chief of Yunyan District, Guiyang, then head of the Communist Youth League provincial organization in Guizhou, then party chief of Liupanshui, then party chief of the provincial capital Guiyang, when he concurrently also held a seat on the provincial party standing committee, entering sub-provincial ranks in October 1995 at age 43.

In 1998, Wang was named Chinese Communist Party Deputy Committee Secretary of Guizhou; he was transferred in 2001 to take on the same role in Sichuan province (when he served under Zhou Yongkang for about a year), then transferred again to Fujian, again the same office. Wang was appointed Governor of Anhui on January 31, 2008; it took him a total of 13 years to ascend from a sub-provincial level office to provincial-level.

== Gansu ==
In December 2011, Wang made the final leap in his political career, becoming the provincial party chief of Gansu. His selection to fill the top post in Gansu was seen as a promotion - although given his Youth League pedigree and his diverse regional experiences, political observers characterized the move to the interior province as the final stage of Wang's lengthy political career, and thus relatively disappointing for Wang, who had spent his political life toiling in various locales around the country.

In February 2013, online images of Wang wearing a luxury watch surfaced and spread around the internet. Wang ran into further trouble with the media in March 2016. A reporter of a Lanzhou daily newspaper was arrested by Wuwei police on dubious charges related to fraud and prostitution, stirring protests online. Reporters attempted to ask Wang, the first-in-charge of Gansu, what he thought of this incident, during the 2016 National People's Congress. Instead of giving an answer, it was said that Wang was mum about the incident in front of reporters, causing some dead air which angered the press.

In January 2017, former Lanzhou party chief Yu Haiyan was placed under investigation for corruption, sending shockwaves on the Gansu political scene. Around this time, several prominent Gansu officials had committed suicide by jumping into the river. In March, Wang relinquished his post as Party Secretary of Gansu, and was made vice chair of the National People's Congress Education, Science, Culture and Public Health Committee. On July 5, Wang was detained by the authorities. On July 11, 2017, he was placed under investigation for violating party discipline by the Central Commission for Discipline Inspection. He was expelled from the Communist Party on September 22, 2017. In 2018 it was reported prosecutors alleged Wang had accepted bribes from Ye Jianming of CEFC China Energy in 2011.

On April 11, 2019, Wang was sentenced 12 years in prison, and fined 4 million yuan for bribery in Zhengzhou.

Government offices
Preceded by Wang Jinshan	Governor of Anhui; 2008–2011	Succeeded by Li Bin
Party political offices
Preceded by Lu Hao	Party Secretary of Gansu; 2011–2017	Succeeded by Lin Duo
