= Lin Duo =

Chinese politician

- 林铎

Party Secretary of Gansu
- In office 1 April 2017 – 31 March 2021
- Preceded by: Wang Sanyun
- Succeeded by: Yin Hong

Governor of Gansu
- In office 1 April 2016 – 11 April 2017
- Preceded by: Liu Weiping
- Succeeded by: Tang Renjian

Party Secretary of Harbin
- In office January 2012 – August 2014
- Preceded by: Gai Ruyin
- Succeeded by: Chen Haibo

Mayor of Harbin
- In office July 2010 – January 2012
- Preceded by: Zhang Xiaolian
- Succeeded by: Song Xibin

Personal details
- Born: March 1956 (age 69) Heze, Shandong, China
- Party: Chinese Communist Party

Military service
- Branch/service: People's Liberation Army Navy

Lin Duo (Chinese: 林铎; pinyin: Lín Duó; born March 1956) is a Chinese politician currently serving as the Party Secretary of Gansu. He formerly served as CCP Committee Secretary and Mayor of Harbin, and Secretary of the Commission for Discipline Inspection of Liaoning Province.

== Biography ==
Lin Duo was born in March 1956 in Heze, Shandong province. In November 1974, he enlisted in the People's Liberation Army Navy and served as a submariner for five years. He joined the Chinese Communist Party in October 1975. After leaving the military in 1979, he worked in the Ministry of Aerospace Industry.

In 1982, Lin began working for the road administration office of Huairou County in suburban Beijing, embarking on a career in the Beijing government lasting nearly three decades. He rose through the ranks first in Huairou County, then in the Beijing Highway Bureau, and the Beijing Urban Management Committee. He was appointed governor of Beijing's Xicheng District in 2003, and CCP Committee Secretary of Xicheng in 2006. During his tenure in Beijing he studied at the Beijing Party School on a part-time basis, earning a bachelor's degree in 1993 and a master's in 1997.

In July 2010, following the merger of Xicheng District with Xuanwu District, Lin Duo was transferred to Harbin, the capital of Heilongjiang province in Northeast China, to serve as its Deputy Party Secretary and Mayor. In January 2012 he was promoted to party chief of Harbin, and entered the Heilongjiang provincial party standing committee three months later, ascending to sub-provincial ranks.

In August 2014, during the anti-corruption campaign under Xi Jinping, Lin was transferred to Liaoning province, serving as Secretary of the Commission for Discipline Inspection, the provincial anti-corruption body, and a member of the provincial party standing committee. In Liaoning, Lin was instrumental in leading the investigation into the Liaoning vote-buying scandal, which led to the suspension of the provincial People's Congress.

On 1 April 2016, Lin Duo was made acting Governor of Gansu in northwest China, succeeding Liu Weiping, who had resigned and transferred to an academic position. At the time of Lin's appointment in Gansu, the number of native Gansu officials on its provincial standing committees was a mere two people: Xian Hui and Yu Haiyan (Xian would be transferred out of Gansu only a few months later, and Yu would come under investigation for corruption). Lin's appointment to the governor post was also unusual in that he went directly from a discipline chief position to governor. On 11 April 2017, Lin was appointed as the CCP Committee Secretary of Gansu.

Lin was an alternate of the 18th Central Committee of the Chinese Communist Party and a full member of the 19th Central Committee.
