= Yao Mugen =

Chinese politician

- 姚木根

Vice-Governor of Jiangxi
- In office May 2011 – March 2014
- Governor: Lu Xinshe

Chairman of Jiangxi Development and Reform Commission
- In office March 2007 – September 2011
- Preceded by: Hong Lihe (洪礼和)
- Succeeded by: Xu Aimin (许爱民)

Director of the General Office of the Government of Jiangxi Province
- In office April 2003 – March 2007
- Preceded by: Zhu Zhangcai (朱张才)
- Succeeded by: Xu Yi (徐毅)

Personal details
- Born: November 1957 (age 68) Zhangshu, Jiangxi, China
- Party: Chinese Communist Party (expelled)
- Spouse: Yi Anping
- Education: Jiangxi University of Finance and Economics

Yao Mugen (Chinese: 姚木根; pinyin: Yáo Mùgēn; born November 1957) is a former Chinese politician from Jiangxi province. He served as Vice-Governor of Jiangxi from 2011 to 2014, and prior to that Chairman of the Jiangxi Development and Reform Commission, a provincial body with broad powers over the economy. He was removed from his posts and investigated by the Central Commission for Discipline Inspection in March 2014.

== Biography ==
Yao was born into a family of farmers and was raised in Ganzhu village, located near the city of Zhangshu, Jiangxi province. His father was a one-time village Chinese Communist Party Committee Secretary (essentially, the leader of the village). He was the first of three children. He graduated from Jiangxi University of Finance and Economics in 1986, where he majored in economics.

After graduation, Yao worked in Jiangxi Planning Commission. In December 1998, he rose through the ranks to become the deputy director of Jiangxi Provincial General Office. In August 2000 he was promoted to become the Deputy Secretary General of Jiangxi People's Government and Chairman of Jiangxi Provincial General Office, a position he held until March 2007.

In March 2007, Yao was promoted to become the Chairman of Jiangxi Development and Reform Commission. In 2009, internet postings surfaced alleging that Yao's niece had been smoking luxury-brand cigarettes and frequently sported a Louis Vuitton bag, attracting online criticism and speculation about his family's wealth.

The Development and Reform Commission (Fagaiwei) is one of the most powerful bodies in the province. As Fagaiwei chief, Yao and his office was in charge of approving large investment and construction projects across the province. In May 2011, Yao was promoted to become the Vice-Governor of Jiangxi. This was not Yao's preferred position but he took up the job anyway; he was said to have wanted a seat on the provincial Party Standing Committee, the real center of power, and also take on a first-in-charge position as party chief of a major city. During his vice-governorship he visited his home village to attend the 80th birthday of his father.

On March 22, 2014, the Central Commission for Discipline Inspection (CCDI) announced that Yao was undergoing investigation for "serious violations of laws and regulations". It was said that Yao's investigation was a harbinger for the fate of former Jiangxi party chief Su Rong (term in Jiangxi 2007–2013) under whom Yao's career had flourished. Indeed, on June 14, 2014, Su Rong, who had then rose to become vice-chairman of the national legislative advisory body, was himself detained for investigation.

On August 6, 2014, following the CCDI investigation, state media announced Yao's expulsion from the Chinese Communist Party. Yao was said to have abused his power for the illicit gain of others and taken bribes personally and through his family. Yao was arrested and arraigned by the Supreme People's Procuratorate. He was indicted on charges of bribery, then tried in the Intermediate People's Court in Xiamen.

On December 18, 2015, Yao Mugen was sentenced to 13-year jail and confiscate personal property worth 3 million yuan (~$463,000) for taking bribes worth 23 million yuan by the court.

== Family ==
Yao had two younger brothers, both of whom were also officials; one was a county party chief, another worked for a local prosecution agency.

Yao was married to Yi Anping (易安萍), who was also detained for investigation. Yi was widely rumoured in Jiangxi province to also be a major shareholder of two listed companies headquartered in Jiangxi, though this has not been conclusively proven. A local resident being interviewed about the Yao case remarked, "there's rumours flying around everywhere about this... at least get a stranger to open up an account on your behalf [so it's not suspicious], it's ridiculous to think that he would let his wife take this on personally."

Government offices
Previous: Hong Lihe	Chairman of Jiangxi Development and Reform Commission; 2007–2011	Next: Xu Aimin
