= Head of the Organization Department of the Chinese Communist Party =

Chinese Communist Party position

Head of the Organization Department of the Central Committee of the Chinese Communist Party
- 中国共产党中央委员会宣傳部部长
- Emblem of the Chinese Communist Party

- Flag of the Chinese Communist Party

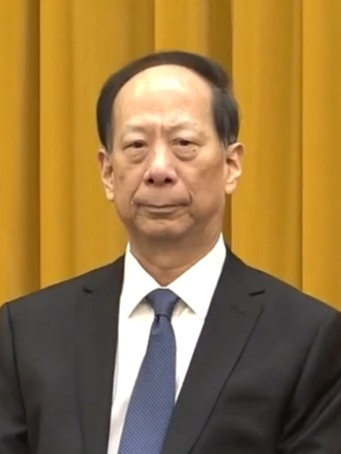
- Incumbent; Shi Taifeng since April 2, 2025
- Organization Department of the Chinese Communist Party
- Type: Department Head
- Status: Provincial and ministerial-level official
- Seat: Beijing
- Nominator: Central Committee
- Appointer: Central Committee
- Inaugural holder: Zhang Guotao
- Formation: July 1921
- Deputy: Deputy Head

The head of the Organization Department of the Central Committee of the Chinese Communist Party is the leader of the Organization Department, a department of the Central Committee of the Chinese Communist Party (CCP).

The current head of the Organization Department is Shi Taifeng, who is also a member of the Politburo of the Chinese Communist Party.

== List of heads ==
Name	Start	End	Notes	Ref.
Zhang Guotao	July 1921	June 1923		
Mao Zedong	May 1924	January 1925		
Chen Duxiu	January 1925	April 1927		
Zhang Guotao	April 1927	July 1927		
Li Weihan	August 1927	September 1927		
Luo Yinong	September 1927	January 1928	Head of the Organization Department Office	
Zhou Enlai	January 1928	February 1930		
Xiang Ying	November 1928	November 1928	Acting	
Xiang Zhongfa	February 1930	August 1930	Leader of the Organization Department	
Zhou Enlai	February 1930	March 1930	Actual head of the Organization Department	
Li Lisan	March 1930	August 1930	Actual head of the Organization Department	
Zhou Enlai	September 1930	January 1931		
Kang Sheng	January 1931	March 1931		
Li Zhusheng	March 1931	December 1931	Acting	
Kang Sheng	December 1931	Late 1932	Head of the Organization Bureau	
Huang Li	1932	1932		
Kong Yuan	Late 1932	January 1933	Head of the Organization Bureau	
Ren Bishi	January 1933	March 1933		
Li Weihan	March 1933	November 1935	Head of the Organization Bureau	
Zhou Enlai	November 1935	1935	Leader of the Organization Bureau	
Li Weihan	1935	September 1936	Head of the Organization Department of the CCP Northwest Bureau	
Zhang Wentian	September 1936	October 1936	Acting	
Guo Hongtao	October 1936	February 1937	Acting	
Bo Gu	February 1937	December 1937		
Chen Yun	December 1937	March 1944	Incapacitated in March 1943	
Peng Zhen	March 1944	April 1953	Acting until August 1945	
Rao Shushi	April 1953	April 1954		
Deng Xiaoping	April 1954	November 1956		
An Ziwen	November 1956	August 1966		

=== Cultural Revolution period ===
Soon after the start of the Cultural Revolution, the Organization Department came to a halt.

Name	Start	End	Notes	Ref.
Nie Jifeng	August 1966	?	Leader of the Organization Department Working Group	
Zhu Guang	?	?	Leader of the Organization Department Working Group	
Yang Shirong	?	October 1967	Acting leader of the Organization Department as leader of the Special Investigation Group	
Guo Yufeng	October 1967	August 1973	Leader of the Organization Department Working Group	
Kang Sheng	November 1970	December 1975	Leader of the Central Organization and Propaganda Leading Group	
Guo Yufeng	August 1973	June 1975	Leader of the Central Leading Group of the Organization Department	

=== Head of the Organization Department of the Central Committee ===
Name	Start	End	Ref.
Guo Yufeng	June 1975	December 1977	
Hu Yaobang	December 1977	December 1978	
Song Renqiong	December 1978	February 1983	
Chen Yeping	February 1983	April 1984	
Qiao Shi	April 1984	July 1985	
Wei Jianxing	July 1985	May 1987	
Song Ping	May 1987	December 1989	
Lu Feng	December 1989	October 1994	
Zhang Quanjing	October 1994	March 1999	
Zeng Qinghong	March 1999	October 2002	
He Guoqiang	24 October 2002	22 October 2007	
Li Yuanchao	22 October 2007	19 November 2012	
Zhao Leji	19 November 2012	28 October 2017	
Chen Xi	28 October 2017	26 April 2023	
Li Ganjie	26 April 2023	2 April 2025	
Shi Taifeng	2 April 2025	Incumbent	
