= Song Zhaosu =

Chinese politician (1941–2022)

- 宋照肃

Party Secretary of Gansu
- In office January 2001 – August 2003
- Preceded by: Sun Ying
- Succeeded by: Su Rong

Chairman of Gansu Provincial People's Congress
- In office 2003–2003
- Preceded by: Lu Kejian
- Succeeded by: Su Rong

Governor of Gansu
- In office January 1999 – January 2001
- Preceded by: Sun Ying
- Succeeded by: Lu Hao

Personal details
- Born: March 1941 Nanyang County, Henan, China
- Died: 25 July 2022 (aged 81) Shanghai, China
- Party: Chinese Communist Party
- Education: Zhengzhou University

Chinese name
- Simplified Chinese: 宋照肃
- Traditional Chinese: 宋照肅
Transcriptions
Standard Mandarin
- Hanyu Pinyin: Sòng Zhàosù

Song Zhaosu (Chinese: 宋照肃; pinyin: Sòng Zhàosù; March 1941 – 25 July 2022) was a Chinese politician.

== Early life and education ==
He was born in Nanyang, Henan. He graduated from Zhengzhou University in 1964 and a year later joined the Chinese Communist Party.

== Career ==
Song Zhaosu had started his political career as the head of the Organization Department of Zhoukou District Committee in Zhoukou, Henan province. Later on, he served as deputy secretary of the Shangshui County Committee and then was its magistrate and secretary of Taikang County. Following that he became a secretary of both Zhoukou and Xuchang districts as well as of Standing Committee of the National People's Congress and Political and Legal Committee of the Henan Provincial Party Committee. In 1988 he became a member of the Standing Committee and then was appointed vice-governor of his home province. Zhaosu was then appointed a governor and served there from 1999 to 2001 and from that year till 2003 was a Communist Party Committee Secretary of Gansu. On 22 April 2002, he was elected as the secretary of the provincial party committee at the 10th meeting of the CCP Gansu Provincial Committee. From January 2003 to August of the same year, he served as the director of the Standing Committee of the Gansu Provincial People's Congress. In August 2003, he served as deputy director of the 10th People's Congress Environment and Resources Protection Committee.

He also served as an alternate of the 15th Central Committee of the Chinese Communist Party and was a member of its 16th Central Committee. In March 2005, he was elected as a member of the Standing Committee of the National People's Congress in the Third Session of the 10th National People's Congress.

== Death ==
On 25 July 2022, he died from an illness in Shanghai, at the age of 81.

Government offices
Preceded by Sun Ying	Governor of Gansu; 1999–2001	Succeeded by Lu Hao
Party political offices
Preceded by Sun Ying	Party Secretary of Gansu; 2001–2003	Succeeded by Su Rong
Assembly seats
Preceded by Lu Kejian	Chairman of Gansu Provincial People's Congress; 2003	Succeeded by Su Rong
