= Liu Weiping =

Chinese politician

- 刘伟平
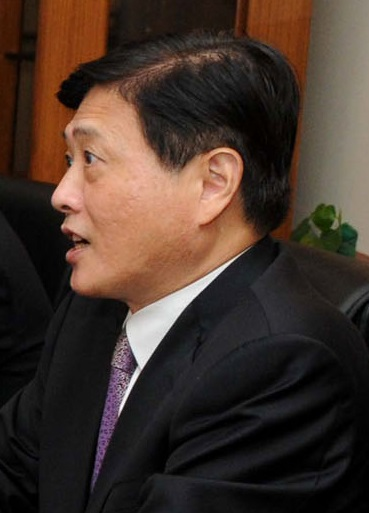

Governor of Gansu
- In office 29 July 2010 – 1 April 2016
- Preceded by: Xu Shousheng
- Succeeded by: Lin Duo

Personal details
- Born: May 1953 (age 73) Fujin, Heilongjiang, China
- Party: Chinese Communist Party
- Education: Nanjing University of Aeronautics and Astronautics; Central Party School

Liu Weiping (Chinese: 刘伟平; born May 1953) is a Chinese politician, currently serving as Vice President of the Chinese Academy of Sciences. He served as Governor of Gansu from 2010 to 2016, and prior to that, Vice-Governor of Qinghai Province and mayor of Nanchang.

== Career ==
=== Aeronautical industry ===
Liu Weiping is a native of Fujin, Heilongjiang province. He entered the work force in 1968 as a sent-down youth in Nanchang County, Jiangxi province, and in 1970 started working at the Hongdu Machinery Building Factory (now Hongdu Aviation Industry Group) under the then Ministry of Aerospace Industry.

In 1972 Liu Weiping enrolled at the Nanjing Institute of Aeronautics (now Nanjing University of Aeronautics and Astronautics) in Nanjing, studying aircraft design. He joined the Chinese Communist Party in January 1974. After college he returned to the Hongdu Machinery Building Factory in 1976, working for its design institute.

=== Government ===
In 1986 Liu was transferred to the provincial government of Jiangxi, working under then Jiangxi governor Wu Guanzheng, and then rising through the ranks to become Mayor of Nanchang, the provincial capital, in 1995. From 1998 to 2001 he was trained in the part-time postgraduate program of the Central Party School of the Chinese Communist Party, where he obtained a master's degree in Economics.

In July 2001 Liu Weiping was transferred to distant Qinghai province to become its Vice-Governor, then in May 2003, Liu was named secretary-general of the Qinghai party committee, reporting to then provincial party chief Zhao Leji; he was then elevated to Deputy Communist Party Secretary in August 2004. In December 2006 he was transferred again to the same position in neighbouring Gansu province. In July 2010 Liu was appointed Acting Governor of Gansu, and on 18 January 2011 he was elected Governor by the Gansu Provincial Congress. In January 2013 Liu was reelected Governor of Gansu.

In April 2016, Liu was transferred to become the Vice President of the Chinese Academy of Sciences (minister-level). Such a transfer was considered unusual as Liu had not yet reached the mandated retirement age for active provincial-ministerial officials at 65; moreover, Liu was moved from a position of power in government to a deputy academic position, the only such case since the 18th Party Congress, raising the eyebrows of some political observers.

Liu was an alternate member of the 17th Central Committee, and a full member of the 18th Central Committee of the Chinese Communist Party.

Political offices
Preceded by Xu Shousheng	Governor of Gansu; 2010–2016	Succeeded by Lin Duo
