= Song Xibin =

Chinese politician (born 1963)

- 宋希斌

Vice Chairman of Heilongjiang People's Congress
- In office January 2018 – January 2022
- Chairman: Zhang Qingwei; Xu Qin

Mayor of Harbin
- In office January 2012 – January 2018
- Party Secretary: Lin Duo; Chen Haibo; Wang Zhaoli
- Preceded by: Lin Duo
- Succeeded by: Sun Zhe

Personal details
- Born: April 1963 (age 63) Harbin, Heilongjiang, China
- Party: Chinese Communist Party
- Education: Harbin Normal University; Harbin Engineering University; Central Party School of the Chinese Communist Party

Song Xibin (Chinese: 宋希斌; pinyin: Sòng Xībīn; born April 1963) is a Chinese former politician who spent his entire career in northeast China's Heilongjiang province. He was investigated by China's top anti-graft agency in January 2022. Previously he served as vice chairman of Heilongjiang People's Congress and president of Heilongjiang Federation of Trade Unions and before that, mayor of Harbin. He was a delegate to the 11th and 12th National People's Congress.

== Biography ==
Song was born in Harbin, Heilongjiang, in April 1963, while his ancestral home in Penglai County, Shandong. In 1982, he was accepted to Harbin Normal University, majoring in mathematics. After graduation, he taught at Harbin No. 14 High School.

Song joined the Chinese Communist Party in June 1984, and got involved in politics in March 1986, when he was assigned to the local branch of the Communist Youth League of China. In November 2002, he eventually rose to become secretary of Heilongjiang Provincial Committee of the Communist Youth League of China, the top political position in the organization. In June 2005, he became deputy secretary-general of Heilongjiang Provincial People's Government, but having held the position for only four months. In November 2005, he was transferred to Daxing'anling Prefecture and appointed governor, concurrently serving as party secretary since February 2008. In February 2010, he was appointed director of Heilongjiang Provincial Development and Reform Commission, concurrently holding the party branch secretary position. In December 2011, he became vice mayor of the capital Harbin, rising to mayor in January 2012. In January 2018, he took office as vice chairman of Heilongjiang People's Congress, concurrently serving as president of Heilongjiang Federation of Trade Unions since August 2019.

== Downfall ==
On 26 January 2022, he was put under investigation for alleged "serious violations of discipline and laws" by the Central Commission for Discipline Inspection (CCDI), the party's internal disciplinary body, and the National Supervisory Commission, the highest anti-corruption agency of China. On November 5, he has been arrested on suspicion of taking bribes as per a decision made by the Supreme People's Procuratorate.

Civic offices
Preceded by Xia Lihua	Secretary of Heilongjiang Provincial Committee of the Communist Youth League of China; 2002–2005	Succeeded by Gao Huan
Preceded by ?	President of Heilongjiang Federation of Trade Unions; 2019–2022	Succeeded by TBA
Government offices
Preceded by Wang Zhonglin	Governor of Daxing'anling Prefecture; 2005–2009	Succeeded by Shan Zengqing
Preceded by Tang Xiuting	Director of Heilongjiang Provincial Development and Reform Commission; 2010–2011	Succeeded by Wang Dongguang
Preceded by Lin Duo	Mayor of Harbin; 2012–2018	Succeeded by Sun Zhe
