= Su Rong =

Chinese politician

- 苏荣

Vice Chairman of the Chinese People's Political Consultative Conference
- In office 11 March 2013 – 25 June 2014
- Chairman: Yu Zhengsheng

Party Secretary of Jiangxi
- In office 30 November 2007 – 20 March 2013
- Governor: Wu Xinxiong; Lu Xinshe
- Preceded by: Meng Jianzhu
- Succeeded by: Qiang Wei

Party Secretary of Gansu
- In office 19 August 2003 – 17 July 2006
- Governor: Lu Hao
- Preceded by: Song Zhaosu
- Succeeded by: Lu Hao

Party Secretary of Qinghai
- In office 25 October 2001 – 19 August 2003
- Governor: Zhao Leji
- Preceded by: Bai Enpei
- Succeeded by: Zhao Leji

Personal details
- Born: October 1948 (age 77) Taonan, Jilin, China
- Party: Chinese Communist Party (1970–2015, expelled)
- Spouse: Yu Lifang
- Children: 3

Chinese name
- Simplified Chinese: 苏荣
- Traditional Chinese: 蘇榮
Transcriptions
Standard Mandarin
- Hanyu Pinyin: Sū Róng

Su Rong (Chinese: 苏荣; pinyin: Sū Róng; born October 1948) is a former senior regional official and politician in China. He began his career in his native Jilin, and successively served as Chinese Communist Party Committee Secretary of Qinghai, Gansu, and Jiangxi provinces. In March 2013, he became one of the vice-chairmen of the Chinese People's Political Consultative Conference (CPPCC).

In 2014, Su was subject to a probe by the Central Commission for Discipline Inspection for "disciplinary violations", which led to criminal charges. He was sentenced to life in prison for accepting a "massive amount of bribes". He is one of the highest-ranking officials to come under investigation for graft since Xi Jinping became General Secretary of the Chinese Communist Party in 2012.

== Life and career in Jilin ==
Su Rong was born 1948 in Taonan (formerly Tao'an County), Baicheng prefecture, in Northeast China's Jilin province. In 1968 he began working as an accountant in Najin Commune of Tao'an. He joined the Chinese Communist Party in January 1970.

In 1974, Su became the deputy Communist Party chief of Najin Commune, and later party chief. Starting in 1980 he served as deputy party chief of Tao'an County, party chief of Fuyu County, deputy party chief and then party chief of Baicheng prefecture. In 1989 he became the party chief of Siping prefecture-level city, and from 1995 until 1998 he was the party chief of Yanbian Korean Autonomous Prefecture. Starting in 1996 he concurrently served as deputy party chief of Jilin province, a position he held until 2001. From 1994 to 1997 he studied at Jilin University on a part-time basis, receiving a master's degree in economics.

== Career in Qinghai, Gansu, and Jiangxi ==
In 2001, Su Rong was transferred to Qinghai province in Northwest China, serving as its Communist Party Chief, the top official in the province. He also became the chairman of Qinghai Provincial People's Congress in 2002.

In 2003, he became the Communist Party Chief of the neighbouring Gansu province, and concurrently served as chairman of Gansu Provincial People's Congress in 2004.

From 2006 to 2007, Su was the vice president of the Central Party School of the Chinese Communist Party in Beijing, which is a minister-level position, and Zeng Qinghong was the school president at that time.

In 2007, he became the Communist Party Chief of Jiangxi province in East China, succeeding Meng Jianzhu. The next year he also became chairman of Jiangxi Provincial People's Congress. He held both positions until 2013.

He was an alternate member of the 14th and the 15th Central Committee of the Chinese Communist Party, and a full member of the 16th and the 17th Central Committees.

== CPPCC and downfall ==
In March 2013, Su became one of the 23 vice chairmen of the 12th Chinese People's Political Consultative Conference (CPPCC). The position enjoyed the official ranking as a "national leader". However, in June 2014, the Central Commission for Discipline Inspection announced that he was being probed for "disciplinary violations", which typically indicate corruption. At the time of the announcement, he was the highest-ranking official, and the only "national leader"-class figure, to come under investigation for graft since Xi Jinping became General Secretary of the CCP in 2012. Several other senior officials of Jiangxi province had already been under investigation, including vice governors Yao Mugen and Zhao Zhiyong, and vice-chairman of the provincial congress, Chen Anzhong. His CPPCC colleague and former Hu Jintao aide, CPPCC Vice Chairman Ling Jihua, was also detained for corruption in December 2014.

The results of the CCDI investigation into Su Rong was announced February 16, 2015. It concluded that Su Rong "violated organizational discipline, unilaterally upstaged decisions made by consensus [...] used his position of power to seek gain for others during the promotion process of officials and the operations of businesses, took a massive amount of bribes." It also said that he was responsible for wasting government resources and had "leading responsibility" for problems with corruption in Jiangxi province which festered under his watch. In the past, the CCDI's investigation announcements into officials have largely followed a bland and oft-repeated formula. In Su's case, however, the CCDI used many new phrases to describe the details of his alleged wrongdoing. He was said to have "shown blatant disregard about party political rules," "liberally sold offices for cash," "severely poisoned the local political environment," "encouraged and condoned his relatives to use their relationship to him to influence political affairs." His offenses were "of an especially egregious nature and caused extraordinarily bad influence." Su was expelled from the CCP, and indicted on charges of bribery and abuse of power, and his case moved to judicial authorities for prosecution.

On January 23, 2017, Su Rong was sentenced to life in prison for bribery, deprivation of political rights for life and confiscation of all personal property. Court documents showed that he took bribes worth some 116 million yuan ($17 million) between 2002 and 2014. Su Rong said in court that he would obey the court's decision and would not appeal.

== Personal life ==
Su married a woman surnamed Ren (任某), with whom he had three children, a son Su Tiezhi (苏铁志) and two daughters Su Xiaobo (苏晓波) and Su Xiaojuan (苏晓娟). Ren died of cancer in 1993. His son-in-law named Cheng Danfeng, former vice mayor of Zhangjiajie City, was sacked for graft in November 2015. In 1994, he married Yu Lifang (于丽芳), who initially worked in a bank. Yu's elder brother Yu Ping'an (于平安) who was involved in the case committed suicide by swallowing sleeping pills in March 2015.

Party political offices
Preceded by Bai Enpei	Party Secretary of Qinghai; 2001–2003	Succeeded by Zhao Leji
Preceded by Song Zhaosu	Party Secretary of Gansu; 2003–2006	Succeeded by Lu Hao
Preceded by Yu Yunyao	Executive Vice President of the Central Party School of the Chinese Communist Party; 2006–2007	Succeeded by Li Jingtian
Preceded by Meng Jianzhu	Party Secretary of Jiangxi; 2007–2013	Succeeded by Qiang Wei
Assembly seats
Preceded by Bai Enpei	Chairman of Qinghai People's Congress; 2002–2003	Succeeded by Zhao Leji
Preceded by Song Zhaosu	Chairman of Gansu People's Congress; 2004–2006	Succeeded by Lu Hao
Preceded by Meng Jianzhu	Chairman of Jiangxi People's Congress; 2008–2013	Succeeded by Qiang Wei
Preceded by Tung Chee-hwa	Vice Chairmen of the Chinese People's Political Consultative Conference; 2013–2014	Succeeded by Chen Yuan
