= Zhuang Guotai =

Chinese politician

- 庄国泰

Chairman of the Gansu Provincial Committee of the Chinese People's Political Consultative Conference
- Incumbent
- Assumed office 18 January 2023
- Preceded by: Ouyang Jian

Director of the China Meteorological Administration
- In office 4 January 2021 – 23 January 2023
- Preceded by: Liu Yaming
- Succeeded by: Chen Zhenlin

Personal details
- Born: 25 April 1962 (age 64) Quanzhou, Fujian, China
- Party: Chinese Communist Party
- Education: Chengdu University of Information Technology; Peking University

Chinese name
- Simplified Chinese: 庄国泰
- Traditional Chinese: 莊國泰
Transcriptions
Standard Mandarin
- Hanyu Pinyin: Zhuāng Guótài

Zhuang Guotai (Chinese: 庄国泰; born 25 April 1962) is a Chinese politician, currently serving as chairman of the Gansu Provincial Committee of the Chinese People's Political Consultative Conference.

Zhuang is a representative of the 20th National Congress of the Chinese Communist Party and a member of the 14th National Committee of the Chinese People's Political Consultative Conference.

== Early life and education ==
Zhuang was born in Quanzhou, Fujian, on 25 April 1962. After resuming the college entrance examination, in 1979, he was accepted to Chengdu Meteorological College (now Chengdu University of Information Technology), where he majored in atmospheric detection. After graduation, he stayed for teaching. In 1986, he did his postgraduate work at Peking University.

== Career ==
After graduating in 1989, Zhuang was assigned to the State Bureau of Environment Protection, which was reshuffled as Ministry of Ecology and Environment in 2008, and over a period of 28 years worked his way up to the position of vice minister.

Zhuang was party branch secretary of the China Meteorological Administration in December 2020, in addition to serving as director since January of the next year.

In January 2023, Zhuang was transferred to northwest China's Gansu province and appointed chairman of the Gansu Provincial Committee of the Chinese People's Political Consultative Conference, the provincial advisory body.

Government offices
| Preceded by Wan Bentai | Director of the Natural Ecology Protection Department of the Ministry of Ecology and Environment; 2008–2015 | Succeeded by Cheng Lifeng |
| Preceded by Hu Baolin | Director of the Office of the Ministry of Ecology and Environment; 2015–2017 | Succeeded by Tian Weiyong |
| Preceded by Liu Yaming | Director of the China Meteorological Administration; 2021–2023 | Succeeded by Chen Zhenlin |
Assembly seats
| Preceded by Ouyang Jian | Chairman of the Gansu Provincial Committee of the Chinese People's Political Consultative Conference; 2023–present | Incumbent |
