= Xu Guangda =

Chinese general (1908–1969)

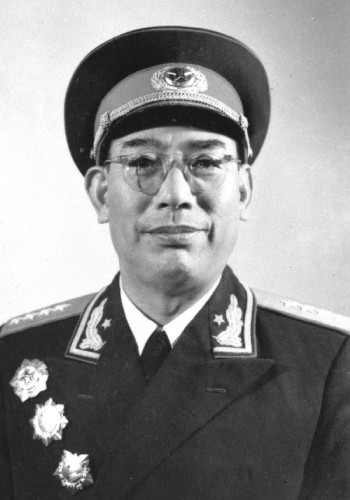
- Born: November 19, 1908; Changsha, Hunan Province, China
- Died: June 3, 1969 (aged 60)
- Military career
- Allegiance: China
- Rank: Grand General
- Awards: Order of Bayi (First Class Medal); Order of Independence and Freedom (First Class Medal); Order of Liberation (First Class Medal)

Xu Guangda (simplified Chinese: 许光达; traditional Chinese: 許光達; pinyin: Xǔ Guāngdá) (November 19, 1908 – June 3, 1969) was a People's Liberation Army general who was conferred the Da Jiang (Grand General) rank in 1955. His former name was Xu Dehua.

Xu Guangda joined the Communist Youth League of China in 1925 and the Chinese Communist Party later the same year. At the age of 18, Xu went to Whampoa Military Academy. A year later, he was appointed the platoon leader on probation in the 4th Army of National Revolutionary Army. He took part in the Nanchang Uprising the same year, designated as the platoon leader and the substituted company commander. During the period of Agrarian Revolutionary War, Xu had held successively the post of: Staff of the 6 Army in the Chinese Workers' and Peasants' Red Army, Political Commissar and Commander of the 17 Divisional Army, Regimental Commander of the 22nd Regiment of the Eighth Divisional Army of 3 Red Army, Commander of the 8 Divisional Army, Regimental Commander of the 25th Regiment of 3 Red Army.

== Early life ==
He was born on November 19, 1908, in Changsha County, Hunan Province. His former name is Xu Dehua. He went to the primary school at the age of seven. In 1921, he went to the Changsha Normal University, and actively participated in the patriotic student movement. In May 1925 he joined the Communist Youth League of China, and in September he joined the Chinese Communist Party.

== Army career ==
In October 1929, Xu was sent by the central command to Honghu revolutionary base areas. In February 1930, he participated in a red army of workers and peasants in China's sixth army. He took turns to act as the army chief, the political committee member and division commander and so on. He took part in opening up the Soviet area centered on Honghu and for many times joined the counter-campaigns against "encirclement and suppression". In the Soviet union in 1932, he successively attended the International Leninism College and Oriental Laborer Communist University to study.

During the Second Sino-Japanese War, Xu Guangda returned to China, successively took on the minister of anti-Japan training college, the principal of the third college, engaged in military theory of Marxism, cultivated anti-Japan cadre. In January 1941, Xu was appointed as the minister of revolutionary military commission as well as the communist party secretary general staff of the central committee, and Yan’an traffic commander, air defense commander, sincerely commander, later the military commander of 120 independent of the eighth route, army division brigade major and the commander of JinSui military area 2nd second, carried out guerrilla warfare civilian and military leadership in Wu Zhai, Shen Chi, partial shut area, strengthened and expanded the anti-Japan base areas.

At the beginning of the communist takeover, he served as commander of the Jinsui Military Region Column 3. In August 1947, he led the number 3 column cross the Yellow River, changing them to belong the Northwest Field Army (later named the First Field Army). He also took part in the Battle of Shajiadian, Yan and Qing. In January 1949, he was appointed commander. July in the same year, during the Battle Humei, which was against the KMT Hu Zong, he led the troops to detour behind enemy lines, break the enemy's retreat, which made a great contribution to ensuring the whole victory. Then he led his army by setting off to the west, conquered the main enemy positions in Nanshan and seized the Yellow River Bridge. At last, they wiped out the whole of the enemy with the 19th corps and liberated Lanzhou.

== Later life ==
In April 1950, Xu Guangda was appointed as the commander and political commissar of the Chinese People's Liberation Army armored units. He began to build the armored corps, started to investigate new domestic tanks (Type 59 tanks and Type 62 light tanks). In September 1950, Xu began to serve as president of the Chinese People's Liberation Army fighting vehicles school at the same time. In January 1951, he inspected the Korean War front-line. After returning to China, he organized the tanks of Chinese People's Volunteers Force, which entered into combat afterwards. In 1956, at the 8th National Congress of the Chinese Communist Party, he was elected as a member of the Central Committee of the Chinese Communist Party. In September 1959, he was appointed as Deputy Secretary of Defense of the People's Republic of China. In February 1967, Kang Sheng and Lin Biao charged He Long of engaging in an alleged mutiny. Xu Guangda was charged as "mutiny Chief of General Staff". On January 16, 1967, the rebels searched the house of Xu, then illegally detained him. In June 1969, Xu died at the age of 61 years through eighteen months of trial and persecution. On June 3, 1977, the Central Military Commission, issued on the 6th file to prove his innocence.

== Appraisal ==
The chief of the propaganda department of the Hunan Provincial Committee of the Chinese Communist Party, Lu Jianping expressed great respect to Xu Guangda and kind greetings to their relatives. He said, Xu Guangda was a loyal communist fighter, a great proletarian revolutionist and an outstanding strategist. He made great contributions to the founding of the People's Republic of China, devoting his whole life and energy to the CCP and the people. He contributed himself to the national independence of China and the liberation of the Chinese people. Lu Jianping also called on the people to take Xu Guangda as an example and to learn from his noble character, and promote his revolutionary spirit.

== Family ==
Xu Guangda's son, Xu Yanbin, is a professor as well as a member of the CCP who was born in May 1939.

Military offices
Preceded by Wang Shitai	Commander of the Gansu Military District; 1950	Succeeded by Wang Shitai
