= Gai Ruyin =

Chinese official

- 盖如垠

Vice Chairman of the Standing Committee of the Heilongjiang Provincial People's Congress
- In office January 2013 – December 2015

Communist Party Secretary of Harbin
- In office September 2009 – January 2012
- Preceded by: Du Yuxin (杜宇新)
- Succeeded by: Lin Duo

Personal details
- Born: March 1953 (age 73) Donggang, Liaoning, China
- Party: Chinese Communist Party (1973–2016, expelled)
- Education: Northeastern University
- Occupation: Politician

Gai Ruyin (Chinese: 盖如垠; pinyin: Gài Rúyín; born March 1953) is a former Chinese official who spent most of his career in Liaoning and Heilongjiang. He was the vice Chairman of the Standing Committee of the Heilongjiang Provincial People's Congress and Communist Party Secretary of Harbin. On December 8, 2015, Gai was placed under investigation by the Communist Party's anti-corruption agency. He was the second high-ranking politician being examined from Heilongjiang province after the 18th Party Congress in 2012.

== Career ==
Gai Ruyin was born and raised in Donggang, Liaoning. He joined Chinese Communist Party in June 1973. In 1970, Gai worked at Shenyang Pressure Factory (沈阳气压机厂) and Shenyang Industrial Installation Company (沈阳市工业安装公司). He became the vice mayor of Shenyang in 1998 and the vice mayor of Harbin from 1998 to 2002. From 2002 Gai became the mayor and Communist Party Secretary of Daqing until 2007; he was also made a member of the provincial Party Standing Committee, joining the elite ranks of provincial politics. He served as the Communist Party Secretary of Harbin from 2009 to 2012. In 2013, having reached retirement age, Gai Ruyin retreated a less substantial role, becoming the Vice Chairman of the Standing Committee of the Heilongjiang Provincial People's Congress.

On December 8, 2015, Gai Ruyin was placed under investigation by the Central Commission for Discipline Inspection of the Chinese Communist Party for "serious violations of regulations".

He was expelled from the party on February 3, 2016, following the party investigation. The investigation concluded that Gai "obstructed the investigation, severely contravened the spirit of the Eight-point Regulation, accepted dining invitations paid for by public funds, used public funds to travel, frequented private clubs; did not observe regulations when promoting subordinates, accepted cash gifts, abused his power for the gain of others; condoned the activities of his son within his area of jurisdiction; his spouse and children accepted cash; contravened state interests in the distribution and purchase of real estate; conducted illicit sexual transactions" abused his power for the business interests of others.

On April 13, 2017, Gai was sentenced to 14 years in prison for bribery.

Party political offices
Previous: Wang Zhibin	Communist Party Secretary of Daqing; 2004–2008	Next: Han Xuejian
