= Zhang Xiaolian =

Chinese politician

- 张效廉

Head of the Publicity Department of Heilongjiang Provincial Committee of the Chinese Communist Party
- In office July 2010 – November 2018
- Preceded by: Yi Junqing
- Succeeded by: Jia Yumei

Personal details
- Born: April 1964 (age 62) Liangshan County, Shandong, China
- Party: Chinese Communist Party (1985–2025; expelled)
- Education: Beijing Forestry University; Peking University

Chinese name
- Simplified Chinese: 张效廉
- Traditional Chinese: 張效廉
Transcriptions
Standard Mandarin
- Hanyu Pinyin: Zhāng Xiàolián

Zhang Xiaolian (Chinese: 张效廉; born April 1964) is a former Chinese politician. As of October 2024 he was under investigation by China's top anti-graft watchdog. Previously he served as vice chairperson of the Committee on Economic Affairs of the 13th National Committee of the Chinese People's Political Consultative Conference.

He was a representative of the 19th National Congress of the Chinese Communist Party. He was a member of the 13th National Committee of the Chinese People's Political Consultative Conference.

== Early life and education ==
Zhang was born in Liangshan County, Shandong, in April 1964. In 1982, he enrolled at Beijing Forestry University, where he majored in prevention and control of forest pests and diseases. He obtained his Ph.D.in Economics from Peking University in January 2008.

== Career ==
Zhang joined the Chinese Communist Party (CCP) in January 1985. After university in 1986, Zhang stayed for working. In December 1989, he moved to the Beijing Municipal Committee of the Communist Youth League of China, where he was promoted to deputy secretary in September 1995 and to secretary in November 1998. In August 2001, he was named acting governor of Fangshan District, confirmed in January 2002.

In March 2005, Zhang was transferred to northeast China's Heilongjiang province and appointed assistant to the governor of Heilongjiang and party secretary of Heilongjiang Forest Industry Bureau. In October 2006, he became party secretary of Mudanjiang and party branch secretary of the Mudanjiang Municipal People's Congress, but having held the position for only two months. He was deputy party secretary of Harbin in January 2007, in addition to serving as mayor since the next month. He was appointed head of the Publicity Department of the CCP Heilongjiang Provincial Committee in July 2010 and was admitted to member of the CCP Heilongjiang Provincial Committee, the province's top authority. He also served as president of the Heilongjiang Federation of Social Sciences between January 2011 and November 2018.

He was vice chairperson of the Committee for Agriculture and Rural Affairs of the Chinese People's Political Consultative Conference in November 2018 and subsequently vice chairperson of the Committee on Economic Affairs of the 13th National Committee of the Chinese People's Political Consultative Conference in August 2020.

== Downfall ==
On 21 October 2024, Zhang was suspected of "serious violations of laws and regulations" by the Central Commission for Discipline Inspection (CCDI), the party's internal disciplinary body, and the National Supervisory Commission, the highest anti-corruption agency of China.

On 23 April 2025, Zhang was expelled from the CCP and his entitlements were canceled. On May 12, he was arrested by the Supreme People's Procuratorate. On September 9, he was indicted on suspicion of accepting bribes. On 20 January 2026, Zhang was sentenced to 12 years and fined 2 million yuan for bribery.

Civic offices
Preceded by Ji Lin	Secretary of the Beijing Municipal Committee of the Communist Youth League of China; 1998–2001	Succeeded by Guan Chenghua
Party political offices
Preceded by Jiao Zhizhong	Governor of Fangshan District; 2002–2005	Succeeded by Qi Hong
Preceded by Shi Zhongxin	Mayor of Harbin; 2007–2010	Succeeded by Lin Duo
Government offices
Preceded by Ma Xiaolin	Communist Party Secretary of Mudanjiang; 2006–2007	Succeeded by Xu Guangguo
Preceded by Yi Junqing	Head of the Publicity Department of Heilongjiang Provincial Committee of the Chinese Communist Party; 2010–2018	Succeeded by Jia Yumei
