= Han Xuejian =

Chinese politician

- 韩学键

Communist Party Secretary of Daqing
- In office February 2008 – December 2014
- Deputy: Xia Lihua (夏立华); Shen Hongyu (沈宏宇)
- Preceded by: Gai Ruyin
- Succeeded by: Zhao Ming (赵铭)

Mayor of Daqing
- In office October 2004 – February 2008
- Preceded by: Gai Ruyin
- Succeeded by: Xia Lihua

Personal details
- Born: November 1961 (age 64) Lanxi County, Heilongjiang, China
- Party: Chinese Communist Party (1985–2015, expelled)
- Education: Dongbei University of Finance and Economics; Harbin Normal University

Chinese name
- Traditional Chinese: 韓學鍵
- Simplified Chinese: 韩学键
Transcriptions
Standard Mandarin
- Hanyu Pinyin: Hán Xuějiàn

Han Xuejian (Chinese: 韩学键; born November 1961) is a former Chinese politician who spent most of his career in Northeast China's Heilongjiang province. He was investigated by the Chinese Communist Party's anti-graft agency in December 2014. Previously he served as the Communist Party Secretary of Daqing, and a Standing Committee of CCP Heilongjiang Provincial Committee.

Han was a member of the 11th National People's Congress.

Chinese media reported that he had close relations with Wang Yongchun, who is the former vice-president of PetroChina.

== Biography ==
Han was born and raised in Lanxi County, Heilongjiang. After the Cultural Revolution, he entered Mudanjiang Commercial College (now Heilongjiang College of Commerce), in October 1978, majoring in commercial economy, where he graduated in August 1980. After college, he was assigned to the Department of Commerce of Heilongjiang province in its accounting department. At the same time, he studied at Liaoning College of Finance and Economics (currently Dongbei University of Finance and Economics).

He entered the workforce in August 1980, and joined the Chinese Communist Party in December 1985. He began rising through the ranks in the provincial commerce department. In November 1987 he was named head of the Reform Office of the department of commerce. In March 1997, he served in a brief stint as the Deputy Communist Party Secretary and Secretary of Politics and Law Committee of Huanan County, a position he held until November 1997.

In November 1997, he was transferred to Harbin, capital of Heilongjiang province, and served as deputy director of the Trade Department of Heilongjiang province.

He served as Vice-Mayor of Qiqihar from October 2002 to February 2004, and Deputy Communist Party Secretary, from February 2004 to October 2004.

In October 2004 he became the Mayor and Deputy Communist Party Secretary of Daqing, a city famous for its oil rigs, and then rising to Communist Party Secretary, the top political position in the city, in February 2008.

On December 22, 2014, state media reported that he would undergo investigation by the Party's internal disciplinary body for "serious violations of laws and regulations". On December 25, 2014, he was removed from office. The internal investigation concluded that Han took bribes and abused his power, and "did not retreat from his actions even after the 18th Party Congress." He was expelled from the Communist Party on April 30, 2015.

On November 16, 2016, Han was sentenced to 12 years and 6 months in prison for bribery.

Government offices
Preceded by Gai Ruyin	Mayor of Daqing; 2004–2008	Succeeded by Xia Lihua
Party political offices
Preceded by Gai Ruyin	Communist Party Secretary of Daqing; 2008–2014	Succeeded by Zhao Ming
