= Wang Junzhi =

Chinese biological products testing expert

- Born: September 1955 (age 70–71); Lanzhou, Gansu, China
- Education: Lanzhou University
- Scientific career
- Fields: Pharmaceuticals
- Workplaces: National Institute for Food and Drug Control

Chinese name
- Traditional Chinese: 王军志
- Simplified Chinese: 王军志
Transcriptions
Standard Mandarin
- Hanyu Pinyin: Wáng Jūnzhì

Wang Junzhi (Chinese: 王军志; born September 1955) is a Chinese biological products testing expert and the deputy director of National Institute for Food and Drug Control.

== Biography ==
Wang was born in Lanzhou, Gansu, in September 1965. He received his master's degree and doctor's degree from Lanzhou University in 1982 and 1985 both in medical science, respectively. In 1988 he went to study in Japan, earning a doctor's degree from Mie University in 1988. In 1995 he joined the National Institute for Food and Drug Control, where he was promoted to deputy director in June 2001.

== Honours and awards ==
- November 22, 2019 Member of the Chinese Academy of Engineering (CAE)
