= Party Secretary of Gansu =

Provincial government position in China

Secretary of the Gansu Provincial Committee of the Chinese Communist Party
- 中国共产党甘肃省委员会书记
- Emblem of the Chinese Communist Party

- Flag of the Chinese Communist Party
- Incumbent; Wu Xiaojun since 22 September 2026
- Gansu Provincial Committee of the Chinese Communist Party
- Type: Party Committee Secretary
- Status: Provincial and ministerial-level official
- Member of: Gansu Provincial Standing Committee
- Nominator: Central Committee
- Appointer: Gansu Provincial Committee Central Committee
- Inaugural holder: Zhang Desheng
- Formation: July 1949
- Deputy: Deputy Secretary; Secretary-General

The Secretary of the Gansu Provincial Committee of the Chinese Communist Party is the leader of the Gansu Provincial Committee of the Chinese Communist Party (CCP). As the CCP is the sole ruling party of the People's Republic of China (PRC), the secretary is the highest ranking post in Gansu.

The secretary is officially appointed by the CCP Central Committee based on the recommendation of the CCP Organization Department, which is then approved by the Politburo and its Standing Committee. The secretary can be also appointed by a plenary meeting of the Gansu Provincial Committee, but the candidate must be the same as the one approved by the central government. The secretary leads the Standing Committee of the Gansu Provincial Committee, and is usually a member of the CCP Central Committee. The secretary leads the work of the Provincial Committee and its Standing Committee. The secretary outranks the governor, who is generally the deputy secretary of the committee.

The current secretary is Wu Xiaojun, who took office on 22 September 2026.

== List of party secretaries ==
Image	Name (English)	Name (Chinese)	Term start	Term end	Ref.
	Zhang Desheng	张德生	July 1949	June 1954	
	Zhang Zhongliang	张仲良	June 1954	January 1961	
	Wang Feng	汪锋	January 1961	November 1966	
	Hu Jizong	胡继宗	November 1966	February 1967	
	Xian Henghan	冼恒汉	February 1971	June 1977	
	Song Ping	宋平	June 1977	January 1981	
	Feng Jixin	冯纪新	January 1981	March 1983	
	Li Ziqi	李子奇	March 1983	October 1990	
	Gu Jinchi	顾金池	October 1990	September 1993	
	Yan Haiwang	阎海旺	September 1993	April 1998	
	Sun Ying	孙英	April 1998	January 2001	
	Song Zhaosu	宋照肃	January 2001	August 2003	
	Su Rong	苏荣	August 2003	July 2006	
	Lu Hao	陆浩	July 2006	December 2011	
	Wang Sanyun	王三运	December 2011	April 2017	
	Lin Duo	林铎	March 2017	March 2021	
	Yin Hong	尹弘	March 2021	December 2022	
	Hu Changsheng	胡昌升	December 2022	September 2026	
	Wu Xiaojun	吴晓军	September 2026	Incumbent	
