= Lu Feng (politician) =

Chinese politician (1927–2022)

Head of the Organization Department of the Chinese Communist Party
- In office 1989–1994
- Preceded by: Song Ping
- Succeeded by: Zhang Quanjing

Personal details
- Born: Li Gongwang; January 1927; Lulong County, Hebei, China
- Died: 1 June 2022 (aged 95); Beijing, China
- Political party: CCP

Chinese name
- Simplified Chinese: 吕枫
- Traditional Chinese: 呂楓
Transcriptions
Standard Mandarin
- Hanyu Pinyin: Lǚ Fēng

Li Gongwang
- Chinese: 李公望
Transcriptions
Standard Mandarin
- Hanyu Pinyin: Lǐ Gōngwàng

Lu Feng (Chinese: 吕枫; January 1927 – 1 June 2022) was a Chinese politician. He was a representative of the 12th, 13th, 14th, and 15th National Congress of the Chinese Communist Party. He was a member of the 14th Central Committee of the Chinese Communist Party.

He served as head of the Organization Department of the Chinese Communist Party from 1989 to 1994.

He died on 1 June 2022 at the age of 95.

Party political offices
Preceded by Song Ping	Head of the Organization Department of the Chinese Communist Party; 1989–1994	Succeeded by Zhang Quanjing
