= Chengdu University of Information Technology =

Provincial public university in Chengdu, Sichuan, China

Coordinates: 30°35′04″N 103°59′13″E

- 成都信息工程大学
- Motto: 成于大气，信达天下
- Type: Public
- Established: 1951
- President: He Jianxin (何建新)
- Academic staff: 1,600
- Students: 25,000
- Location: Chengdu, Sichuan, China
- Website: english.cuit.edu.cn

Chinese name
- Simplified Chinese: 成都信息工程大学
- Traditional Chinese: 成都信息工程大學
Transcriptions
Standard Mandarin
- Hanyu Pinyin: Chéngdū Xìnxī Gōngchéng Dàxué

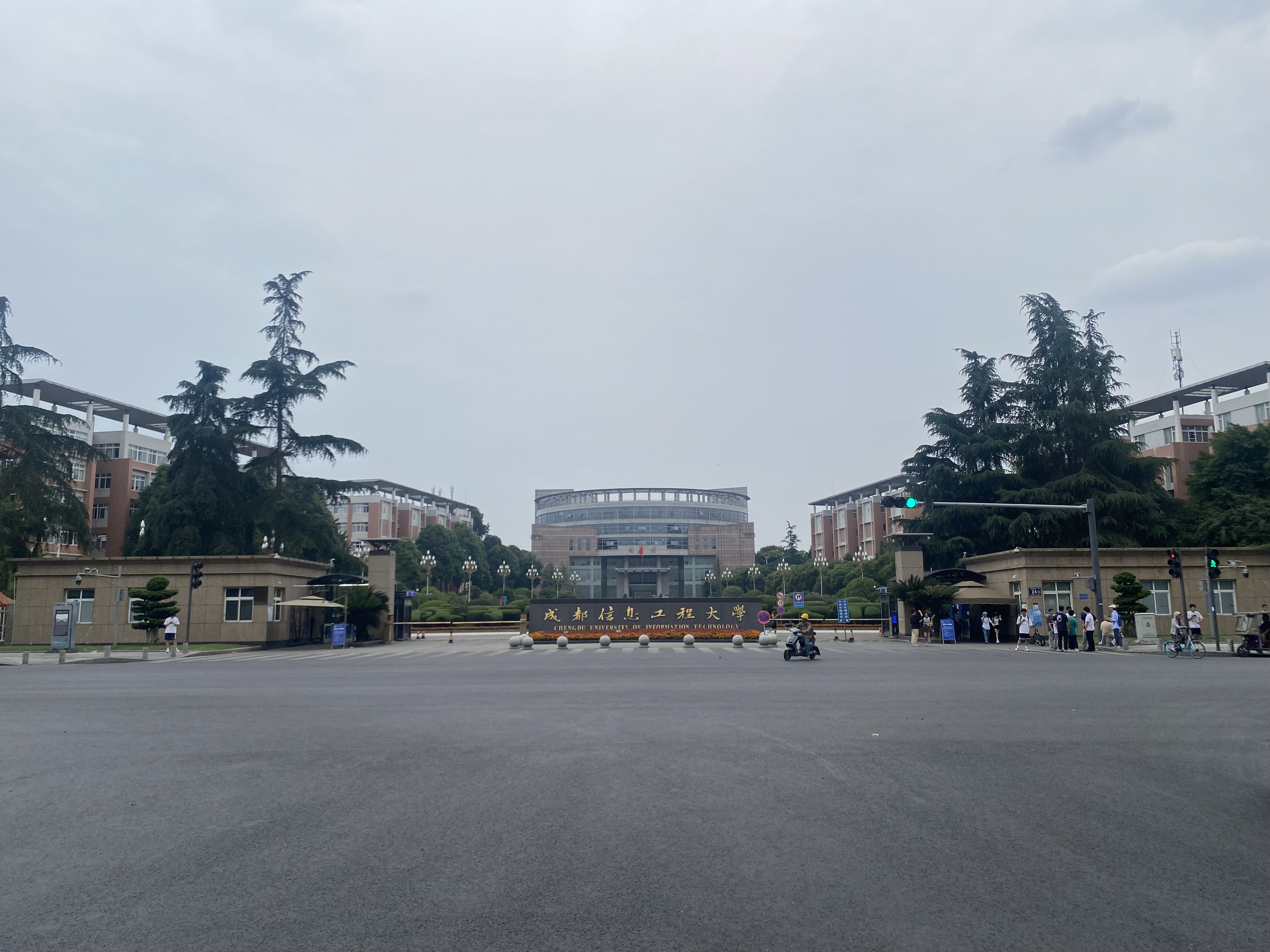
Main entrance of CUIT airport campus

The Chengdu University of Information Technology (CUIT, 成都信息工程大学), formerly the Chengdu Meteorological College (成都气象学院), is a provincial public university in Chengdu, Sichuan, China. The university is affiliated with the Province of Sichuan, and co-sponsored by the China Meteorological Administration and the Sichuan Provincial Government.

CUIT is a leading university in the scientific research and technological application of the interdisciplinary integration of atmospheric science and information technology, and a member of the CDIO Initiative world organization. Since 2004, CUIT has begun educating reserve army officers for the People's Liberation Army Rocket Force, the strategic and tactical missile forces of the People's Republic of China.

In recent years, CUIT has been granted 123 state-level scientific research projects including National Science and Technology Plan, National Natural Science Fund projects, and National Social Science Fund projects, obtaining science and technology funds about 58.2 million RMB annually; 46 provincial and ministerial science awards, two of which are National Science and Technology Progress Awards (second class); 3315 academic papers have been published, with 910 articles cited by the important retrieval system SCI, and over 100 articles on influential journals from both in and abroad.

CUIT has eight key provincial and ministerial laboratories (including Sichuan Engineering and Technological Research Center, Sichuan key Research Bases for Philosophy and Social Sciences), seven key laboratories supervised by universities and Research Bases for Humanities and Social Sciences, and one post-doctoral research station. CUIT has reached advanced world standards in the research of a new-type weather radar system, China Doppler weather radar of a new generation, atmospheric radiation and satellite remote sensing, weather dynamics and dry monsoon, environmental system analysis and environmental monitoring & evaluation, computer and software, information security, and E-commerce.

== History ==
Chengdu University of Information Technology was established in 1951 named Southwest Air Force Meteorological Training Brigade for People's Liberation Army. It was renamed Chengdu School of Meteorology in 1956 and Chengdu Institute of Meteorology in 1978 under the direct administration of China Meteorological Bureau. Since transferred to the direct administration of Sichuan People's Government and renamed Chengdu University of Information Technology in 2000, CUIT has developed into a multidisciplinary university with 53 different majors in 17 schools.

== Key laboratories ==
- Key laboratory of high speed signal processing and implementation

Provincial key laboratory of Sichuan province, established in 2001.

- Key Laboratory of Statistics Information Technology and Data Mining

Ministerial key laboratory of National Bureau of Statistics of China, established on June 9, 2004.

- Key Laboratory of Atmospheric Sounding

Ministerial key laboratory of China Meteorological Administration, established on November 18, 2005.

- Key Laboratory of Plateau Atmosphere and Environment

Provincial key laboratory of Sichuan province, established in December 2006.

- Key Laboratory of Atmospheric Environment Simulation and Pollution Control

Provincial key laboratory of Sichuan province, established in October 2010.

== International Jointly-established Research Laboratories ==
- International Laboratory for Atmospheric Observations jointly found with Colorado State University of America

Research area of the research center consists of meteorological radar, surface meteorology observation and application, multi-source meteorological data fusion, lightning monitoring and early warning, concentrating on meteorological radar signal processing, meteorological radar data quality control and calibration technique, weather radar network composite and synergistic observation, surface meteorology factor gathering tech and facility development, multi-meteorological data process, satellite remote sensing, lightning detection and early warning technology etc.

- International Research Center for Image and Vision jointly found with Vanderbilt University of America

The field of research center includes directions of medical image processing, machine vision and information visualization, computational intelligence. Mainly engages in realms of image theory and application, image information visualization modeling, image segmentation, intelligent principle of visual cognition, machine intelligence cognitive neural model analysis, multimodal brain and spinal cord magnetic resonance image analysis (structure, diffusion, magnetic resonance spectroscopy and functional magnetic resonance imaging) and other researches. Since its establishment in 2016, the center has published more than 10 high-level scientific research papers (all SCI retrieval), successfully applied for two natural science funds, six provincial and ministerial research projects, and more than 10 patents of invention.

- International Research Institute for Robots and Smart Systems jointly found with University of Siegen of Germany

The institute integrates research with design, facing the Robot and Intelligence Equipment supply chain. According to its development, research foundation, research findings accumulation, platform condition and the trend of discipline orientation, CUIT Robot and Intelligence System International United Research Institute will cooperate with EZLS Lab of University of Siegen on launching the scientific research on intelligence environment sensation technology, mobile robot self-positioning navigation technology, medical robot, and intelligence computation (artificial intelligence).

== Academic Units ==
- School of Atmospheric Sciences
- School of Resources and Environment
- School of Applied Mathematics
- School of Electronic Engineering
- School of Control Engineering
- School of Communication Engineering
- School of Computer Science
- School of Software Engineering
- School of Cybersecurity
- School of Optoelectronic Technology
- School of Management
- School of Logistics
- School of Business
- School of Statistics
- School of Culture and Arts
- School of Foreign Languages
- School of Marxism
- Department of Physical Education
- Electric Experiment Center
- Information Center
- Computational Center
- University Library
- Continuing Education College
- Yinxing Hospitality Management College
- Networking Commerce College

== Alumni ==
- Chen Rui (zh:陳睿), CEO of Bilibili, Founder of Cheetah Mobile and Beike Internet Security and General Manager of Kingsoft
