= Li Dengying =

Chinese politician

Li Dengying (Chinese: 李登瀛) (1914–1996) was a Chinese politician. He was born in Shenmu County, Shaanxi Province. He was a member of the Chinese Workers' and Peasants' Red Army early in life. He was the governor of Gansu (January 1981 – March 1983).

Preceded by Feng Jixin	Governor of Gansu; 1981–1983	Succeeded by Chen Guangyi
