= Song Ping =

Chinese revolutionary and politician (1917–2026)

- 宋平
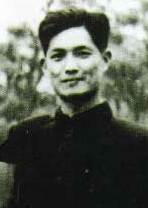
- Song in 1949

Head of the Organization Department of the Chinese Communist Party
- In office June 1987 – December 1989
- General Secretary: Zhao Ziyang; Jiang Zemin
- Preceded by: Wei Jianxing
- Succeeded by: Lu Feng

State Councilor of China
- In office June 1983 – April 1988
- Premier: Zhao Ziyang

Chairman of the State Planning Commission
- In office June 1983 – June 1987
- Premier: Zhao Ziyang
- Preceded by: Yao Yilin
- Succeeded by: Yao Yilin

Party Secretary of Gansu
- In office June 1977 – January 1981
- Deputy: Feng Jixin (Governor)
- Preceded by: Xian Henghan
- Succeeded by: Feng Jixin

Governor of Gansu
- In office June 1977 – December 1979
- Preceded by: Xian Henghan
- Succeeded by: Feng Jixin

Personal details
- Born: Song Yanping (宋延平); 24 April 1917 Ju County, Shandong, Republic of China
- Died: 4 March 2026 (aged 108) Beijing, China
- Party: Chinese Communist Party (1937–2026)
- Spouse: Chen Shunyao (died 2019)
- Children: Song Yichang (son); Song Yichun (son)

Chinese name
- Chinese: 宋平
Transcriptions
Standard Mandarin
- Hanyu Pinyin: Sòng Píng
- Wade–Giles: Sung P'ing

Song Ping (Chinese: 宋平; 24 April 1917 – 4 March 2026) was a Chinese Communist revolutionary and politician. He was a member of the Politburo Standing Committee. Song was considered the last living member of the second generation of CCP leadership.

== Life and career ==
=== Early life and education ===
Song was born on 24 April 1917, into a peasant family in Daluozhuang Village, Zhaoxian Town, Ju County, Shandong Province. Song entered school at the age of nine and advanced rapidly, skipping grades and completing both primary and secondary education in a short period of time. His elder brother once won a prize of 300 silver dollars in a lottery organized by the Universal Postal Union, and gave the entire sum to Song Ping to support his studies in Beiping (now Beijing).

In 1934, Song Ping enrolled in the College of Agriculture at Peking University. In 1935, he was admitted to the Department of Chemistry at Tsinghua University. During his time at Tsinghua, he participated in the December 9th Movement, an anti-Japanese student movement initiated by the Chinese Communist Party, and in 1936 joined the CCP-led patriotic student organization known as the Chinese National Liberation Vanguard.

=== Revolutionary career ===
In 1937, following the outbreak of the full-scale War of Resistance against Japan triggered by the Marco Polo Bridge Incident, Song Ping transferred from Tsinghua University to the National Southwest Associated University in Yunnan. In December of the same year, he joined the Chinese Communist Party.

In 1938, Song Ping entered the second class of the Yan'an Marxism–Leninism Institute. During his studies, he attended lectures by Mao Zedong, including presentations on On New Democracy and other CCP policy-related topics. After graduating, he remained at the institute, serving successively as an officer in the Education Department, head of the Organization Section, director of the Education Department, and researcher at the Central Party Affairs Research Office. In 1941, he was transferred to serve as assistant secretary in the Publicity Department of the CCP Southern Bureau. Thereafter, he held a series of positions at the Chongqing office of Xinhua Daily, including director of the reference section, chief editorial secretary, and secretary-general, eventually becoming head of the Chongqing General Bureau of the Xinhua News Agency.

After the victory in the War of Resistance against Japan, Song Ping traveled with Xinhua News Agency to Nanjing, serving as head of its Nanjing General Bureau. During the negotiations between the Chinese Communist Party and the Kuomintang, he acted as political secretary to Zhou Enlai. Following the breakdown of the talks, he was reassigned to CCP-controlled areas, where he worked on the Northeast Daily in Harbin and participated in founding the Harbin Daily. He later served as deputy secretary of the Guxiang District Committee of the CCP Harbin Municipal Committee.

=== Early years of the People's Republic ===
On 2 November 1948, after the People's Liberation Army captured Shenyang, Song Ping entered the city with the troops to participate in takeover operations. The Shenyang Municipal Working Committee established a Party newspaper committee composed of Song Li, Li Du, Liu Yaxiong, Song Ping, Zhu Weiren, Yu Beichen, Chen Ruiguang, Zhang Chengmin, Chen Shunyao, Xue Guangjun, and Ye Ke, with Song Li serving as secretary and Li Du as deputy secretary.

On 20 December 1948, the municipal working committee's official newspaper and trade union paper, Workers' Daily, was launched as a four-page broadsheet. Li Du served as president, Ye Ke as vice president, Chen Shunyao as editor-in-chief, and Song Ping—then a standing committee member of the Northeast Federation of Trade Unions and deputy head of its Publicity Department—served concurrently as acting editor-in-chief.

After the founding of the People's Republic of China, Song Ping served as director of the Cultural and Educational Department of the Northeast Federation of Trade Unions, secretary-general, and vice chairman of the federation. In 1952, he was transferred to central government work, successively serving as director of the Labor and Wages Bureau of the State Planning Commission, member of the State Planning Commission, vice minister of the Ministry of Labor, and deputy director of the State Planning Commission.

In 1960, Song Ping was appointed a member of the CCP Northwest Bureau and concurrently director of the Northwest Bureau Planning Commission, beginning long-term work in northwest China. In September 1963, he became deputy director of the "Northwest Third Front Construction Committee".

=== During the Cultural Revolution ===
After the outbreak of the Cultural Revolution, Song Ping was marginalized for a period. Later, as Shaanxi Province sought to restore and expand production, a "Production Command Headquarters" was established, and Song Ping was appointed an adviser.

In 1972, he became secretary of the CCP Gansu Provincial Committee (at the time, the position of first secretary existed) and vice chairman of the Provincial Revolutionary Committee. In June 1977, he was promoted to first secretary of the CCP Gansu Provincial Committee and chairman of the Provincial Revolutionary Committee, concurrently serving as second political commissar of the Lanzhou Military Region.

Following the publication of the article "Practice is the Sole Criterion for Testing Truth," Song Ping took the lead within the CCP Gansu Provincial Committee in convening two symposiums to study and discuss the issue of the "criterion of truth". These meetings constituted China's first provincial-level discussions on the truth criterion.

=== Reform and opening-up ===
In 1981, Song Ping returned to central government work, serving as vice chairman and deputy Party group secretary of the State Planning Commission. In June 1983, under Premier Zhao Ziyang's State Council, he was appointed State Councilor and concurrently chairman of the State Planning Commission. Prior to the convening of the 13th National Congress of the Chinese Communist Party in 1987, Song left the Planning Commission to replace Wei Jianxing as head of the CCP Central Organization Department. At the First Plenary Session of the 13th Central Committee, he was elected a member of the CCP Politburo.

After the suppression of the 1989 political turmoil, major leadership adjustments were made at the top of the CCP. Politburo Standing Committee members Zhao Ziyang and Hu Qili were removed from office. At the Fourth Plenary Session of the 13th Central Committee, the 72-year-old Song Ping was elected to the CCP Politburo Standing Committee, together with Jiang Zemin and Li Ruihuan, ranking fifth and entering the highest echelon of leadership.

On 19 October 1992, following the First Plenary Session of the 14th Central Committee, Song Ping retired from his position as a member of the Politburo Standing Committee at the age of 75.

=== Retirement and death ===
On 12 June 2014, at the age of 97, Song Ping attended a charitable event in Beijing. On 3 September 2015, he attended the military parade commemorating the 70th anniversary of the victory in the World Anti-Fascist War. In August 2016, Song Ping attended the Beidaihe meeting together with other retired Party and state leaders, including Hu Jintao.

Song turned 100 on 24 April 2017. In October 2017, Song Ping attended both the opening and closing ceremonies of the 19th National Congress of the Chinese Communist Party. On 30 September 2019, he attended a reception celebrating the 70th anniversary of the founding of the People's Republic of China on 1 October, he attended the anniversary ceremony and mass celebrations. On 1 July 2021, Song Ping attended the ceremony marking the 100th anniversary of the founding of the Chinese Communist Party. In 2022, he attended the 20th Party Congress at age 105.

Song died in Beijing on 4 March 2026, at the age of 108.

Political offices
Preceded by Xian Henghan	Governor of Gansu; 1977–1979	Succeeded by Feng Jixin
Preceded by Yao Yilin	Chairman of the State Planning Commission; 1983–1987	Succeeded by Yao Yilin
Party political offices
Preceded by Xian Henghan	Party Secretary of Gansu; 1977–1981	Succeeded by Feng Jixin
Preceded by Wei Jianxing	Head of the Organization Department of the Chinese Communist Party; 1987–1989	Succeeded by Lu Feng
