= Gansu Provincial Committee of the Chinese Communist Party =

Gansu Provincial Committee of the Chinese Communist Party 中国共产党甘肃省委员会

Overview
- Type: Highest decision-making organ when Gansu Provincial Congress is not in session.
- Elected by: Gansu Provincial Congress
- Length of term: Five years
- Term limits: None
- First convocation: August 19, 1949; 77 years ago
- Secretary: Wu Xiaojun
- Deputy Secretary: Kong Shaoxun (Acting Governor); Shi Moujun
- Secretary-General: Lei Dongsheng
- Executive organ: Standing Committee
- Inspection organ: Commission for Discipline Inspection

Meeting place
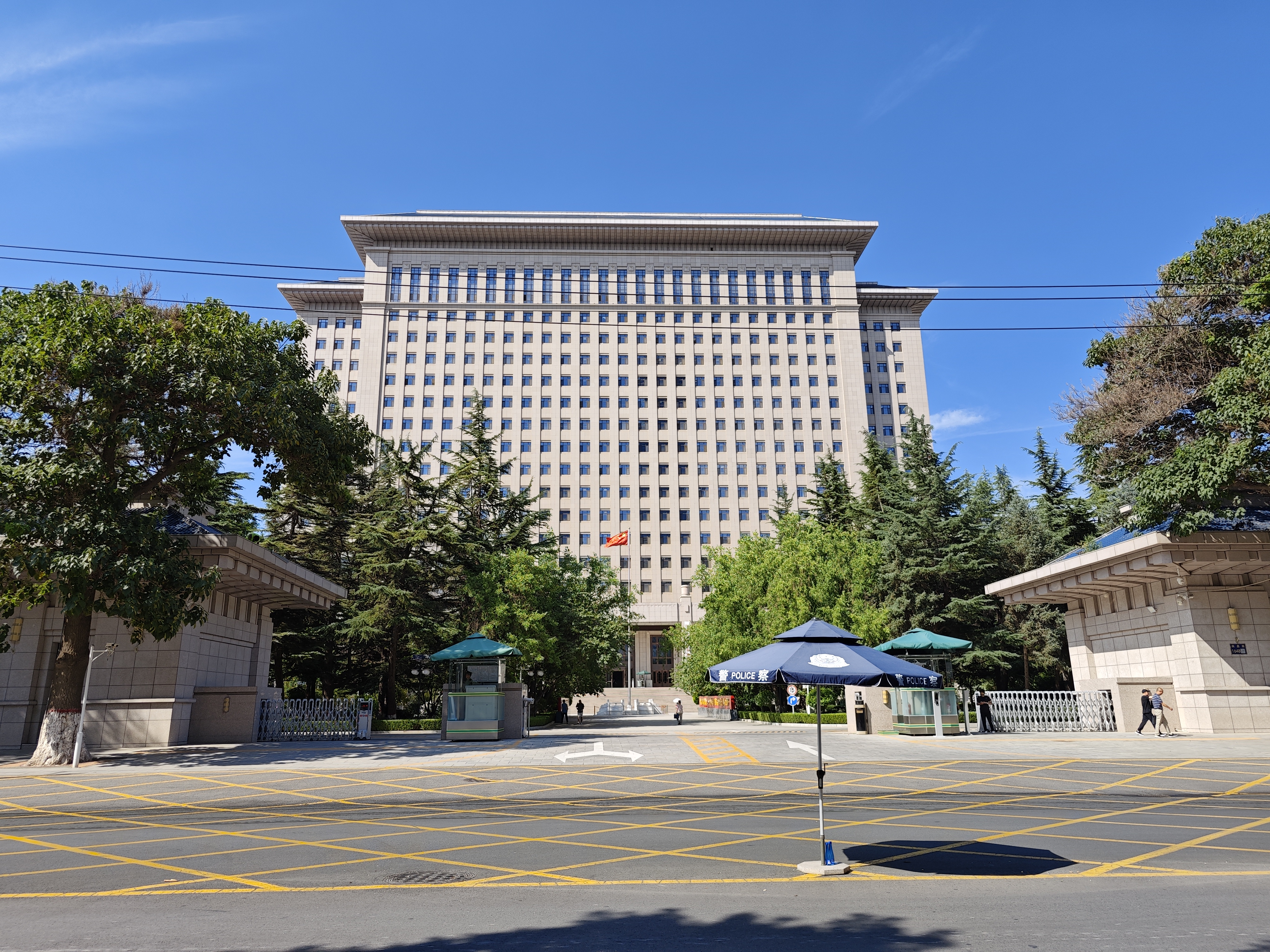
- Gansu Provincial Committee Building in Lanzhou

Gansu Provincial Committee of the Chinese Communist Party
- Simplified Chinese: 中国共产党甘肃省委员会
- Traditional Chinese: 中國共產黨甘肅省委員會
Transcriptions
Standard Mandarin
- Hanyu Pinyin: Zhōngguó Gòngchǎndǎng Gānsùshěng Wěiyuánhuì

Abbreviation
- Simplified Chinese: 中共甘肃省委
- Traditional Chinese: 中共甘肅省委
- Literal meaning: CCP Gansu Provincial Committee
Transcriptions
Standard Mandarin
- Hanyu Pinyin: Zhōnggòng Gānsùshěng Wěi

The Gansu Provincial Committee of the Chinese Communist Party is the provincial committee of the Chinese Communist Party (CCP) in Gansu, China, and the province's top authority. The CCP committee secretary is the highest ranking post in the province.

== Organizations ==
The organization of the Gansu Provincial Committee includes:

- General Office

=== Functional Departments ===
- Organization Department
- Publicity Department
- United Front Work Department
- Political and Legal Affairs Commission
- Social Work Department
- Commission for Discipline Inspection
- Supervisory Commission

=== Offices ===
- Policy Research Office
- Office of the Cyberspace Affairs Commission
- Office of the Foreign Affairs Commission
- Office of the Deepening Reform Commission
- Office of the Institutional Organization Commission
- Office of the Military-civilian Fusion Development Committee
- Taiwan Work Office
- Office of the Leading Group for Inspection Work
- Bureau of Veteran Cadres

=== Dispatched institutions ===
- Working Committee of the Organs Directly Affiliated to the Gansu Provincial Committee

=== Organizations directly under the Committee ===
- Gansu Party School
- Gansu Daily Newspaper Group
- Gansu Institute of Socialism
- Party History Research Office
- Gansu Provincial Archives
- Lecturer Group

=== Organization managed by the work organization ===
- Confidential Bureau

== Leadership ==
=== Heads of the Organization Department ===
Name (English)	Name (Chinese)	Tenure begins	Tenure ends	Note
Li Gang	李刚	February 2024		

=== Heads of the Publicity Department ===
Name (English)	Name (Chinese)	Tenure begins	Tenure ends	Note
Zhang Yongxia	张永霞	June 2022		

=== Secretaries of the Political and Legal Affairs Commission ===
Name (English)	Name (Chinese)	Tenure begins	Tenure ends	Note
Liu Changgen	刘长根	June 2022		

=== Heads of the United Front Work Department ===
Name (English)	Name (Chinese)	Tenure begins	Tenure ends	Note
Sun Xuetao	孙雪涛	June 2022		

== See also ==
- Politics of Gansu
