= Politics of Qinghai =

The politics of Qinghai Province in the People's Republic of China are structured in a dual party-government system like all other governing institutions in mainland China.

The Governor of Qinghai (青海省省长) is the highest-ranking official in the People's Government of Qinghai. However, in the province's dual party-government governing system, the Governor has less power than the Qinghai Chinese Communist Party (CCP) Provincial Committee Secretary (青海省委书记), colloquially termed the "Qinghai Party Chief".

== Post-1949 leadership ==
=== CCP Committee Secretaries ===
Image	Name (English)	Name (Chinese)	Term start	Term end	Ref.
	Zhang Zhongliang	张仲良	September 1949	May 1954	
	Gao Feng	高峰	May 1954	August 1961	
	Wang Zhao	王昭	August 1961	November 1962	
	Yang Zhilin	杨植霖	November 1962	May 1966	
	Liu Xianquan	刘贤权	August 1967	February 1977	
	Tan Qilong	谭启龙	February 1977	December 1979	
	Liang Buting	梁步庭	December 1979	December 1982	
	Zhao Haifeng	赵海峰	December 1982	July 1985	
	Yin Kesheng	尹克升	July 1985	March 1997	
	Tian Chengping	田成平	March 1997	June 1999	
	Bai Enpei	白恩培	June 1999	October 2001	
	Su Rong	苏荣	October 2001	19 August 2003	
	Zhao Leji	赵乐际	19 August 2003	26 March 2007	
	Qiang Wei	强卫	26 March 2007	19 March 2013	
	Luo Huining	骆惠宁	19 March 2013	29 June 2016	
	Wang Guosheng	王国生	29 June 2016	21 March 2018	
	Wang Jianjun	王建军	21 March 2018	29 March 2022	
	Xin Changxing	信长星	29 March 2022	3 January 2023	
	Chen Gang	陈刚	3 January 2023	31 December 2024	
	Wu Xiaojun	吴晓军	31 December 2024	22 September 2026	
	Luo Dongchuan	罗东川	22 September 2026	incumbent	

=== Governors ===
No.	Officeholder	Term of office		Party	Ref.
No.	Officeholder	Took office	Left office	Party	Ref.
Governor of the Qinghai Provincial People's Government
1	Zhao Shoushan (1894–1965)	January 1950	November 1952	Chinese Communist Party	
2	Zhang Zhongliang (1907–1983)	November 1952	June 1954	Chinese Communist Party	
3	Sun Zuobin (1909–2002)	June 1954	December 1954	Chinese Communist Party	
Governor of the Qinghai Provincial People's Committee
(3)	Sun Zuobin (1909–2002)	December 1954	March 1958	Chinese Communist Party	
–	Sun Junyi (1911–1967)	March 1958	June 1958	Chinese Communist Party	
4	Yuan Renyuan (1898–1986)	June 1958	June 1962	Chinese Communist Party	
5	Wang Zhao (1917–1970)	June 1962	March 1967	Chinese Communist Party	
Director of the Qinghai Revolutionary Committee
6	Liu Xianquan (1915–1992)	November 1967	February 1977	Chinese Communist Party	
7	Tan Qilong (1913–2003)	February 1977	April 1979	Chinese Communist Party	
9	Zhang Guosheng (1912–1997)	April 1979	December 1982	Chinese Communist Party	
Governor of the Qinghai Provincial People's Government
10	Huang Jingbo (1919–2014)	December 1982	August 1985	Chinese Communist Party	
11	Song Ruixiang (born 1939)	August 1985	November 1989	Chinese Communist Party	
12	Jin Jipeng (1934–2009)	November 1989	December 1992	Chinese Communist Party	
13	Tian Chengping (born 1945)	December 1992	April 1997	Chinese Communist Party	
14	Bai Enpei (born 1946)	April 1997	August 1999	Chinese Communist Party	
15	Zhao Leji (born 1958)	16 August 1999	20 October 2003	Chinese Communist Party	
16	Yang Chuantang (born 1954)	20 October 2003	23 December 2004	Chinese Communist Party	
17	Song Xiuyan (born 1955)	December 2004	January 2010	Chinese Communist Party	
18	Luo Huining (born 1954)	30 June 2010	28 March 2013	Chinese Communist Party	
19	Hao Peng (born 1960)	28 April 2013	20 December 2016	Chinese Communist Party	
20	Wang Jianjun (born 1958)	20 December 2016	7 August 2018	Chinese Communist Party	
21	Liu Ning (born 1962)	7 August 2018	22 July 2020	Chinese Communist Party	
22	Xin Changxing (born 1956)	1 August 2020	31 March 2022	Chinese Communist Party	
23	Wu Xiaojun (born 1966)	31 March 2022	3 December 2020	Chinese Communist Party	
24	Luo Dongchuan (born 1965)	4 January 2025	Incumbent	Chinese Communist Party	
