= Qinghai Provincial People's Government =

Qinghai Provincial People's Government 青海省人民政府
- Established: January 1950; 76 years ago

Leadership
- Governor: Zhuge Yujie; 30 October 2026
- Parent body: Central People's Government; Qinghai Provincial People's Congress
- Elected by: Qinghai Provincial People's Congress

Website
- www.qinghai.gov.cn

The Qinghai Provincial People's Government is the local administrative agency of Qinghai. It is officially elected by the Qinghai Provincial People's Congress and is formally responsible to the Qinghai Provincial People's Congress and its Standing Committee. Under the country's one-party system, the governor is subordinate to the secretary of the Qinghai Provincial Committee of the Chinese Communist Party. The Provincial government is headed by a governor, currently Zhuge Yujie.

== History ==
In January 1950, the former Qinghai Provincial People's Military and Political Committee was reorganized into the Qinghai Provincial People's Government. In January 1955, it was renamed the Qinghai Provincial People's Committee. In August 1967, it was renamed the Qinghai Provincial Revolutionary Committee. In August 1979, the Qinghai Provincial Revolutionary Committee was abolished and the Qinghai Provincial People's Government was re-established.

== Organization ==
The organization of the Qinghai Provincial People's Government includes:

- General Office of the Qinghai Provincial People's Government

=== Component Departments ===
- Qinghai Provincial Development and Reform Commission
- Qinghai Provincial Department of Education
- Qinghai Provincial Department of Science and Technology
- Qinghai Provincial Department of Industry and Information Technology
- Qinghai Provincial Ethnic and Religious Affairs Committee
- Qinghai Provincial Public Security Department
- Qinghai Provincial Civil Affairs Department
- Qinghai Provincial Department of Justice
- Qinghai Provincial Department of Finance
- Qinghai Provincial Department of Human Resources and Social Security
- Qinghai Provincial Department of Natural Resources
- Qinghai Provincial Department of Ecology and Environment
- Qinghai Provincial Department of Housing and Urban-Rural Development
- Qinghai Provincial Department of Transportation
- Qinghai Provincial Water Resources Department
- Qinghai Provincial Department of Agriculture and Rural Affairs
- Qinghai Provincial Department of Commerce
- Qinghai Provincial Department of Culture and Tourism
- Qinghai Provincial Health Commission
- Qinghai Provincial Department of Veterans Affairs
- Qinghai Provincial Emergency Management Department
- Qinghai Provincial Audit Office
- Foreign Affairs Office of Qinghai Provincial People's Government

=== Directly affiliated special institution ===
- State-owned Assets Supervision and Administration Commission of Qinghai Provincial People's Government

=== Organizations under the government ===
- Qinghai Provincial Forestry and Grassland Bureau
- Qinghai Provincial Market Supervision Administration
- Qinghai Provincial Local Financial Administration Bureau
- Qinghai Provincial Radio and Television Bureau
- Qinghai Provincial Sports Bureau
- Qinghai Provincial Bureau of Statistics
- Qinghai Provincial Rural Revitalization Bureau
- Qinghai Provincial Medical Insurance Bureau
- Qinghai Provincial Civil Air Defense Office
- Qinghai Province Petition Bureau

=== Departmental management organization ===
- The Qinghai Provincial Government Service Supervision and Management Bureau is managed by the Provincial Government Office.
- The Qinghai Provincial Government Agencies Affairs Bureau is managed by the Provincial Government Office.
- The Qinghai Provincial Grain Bureau is managed by the Provincial Development and Reform Commission.
- The Qinghai Provincial Energy Bureau is managed by the Provincial Development and Reform Commission.
- The Qinghai Provincial Prison Administration Bureau is managed by the Provincial Department of Justice.
- The Qinghai Provincial Drug Supervision and Administration Bureau is managed by the Provincial Market Supervision Bureau.
- The Qinghai Provincial Cultural Relics Bureau is managed by the Provincial Department of Culture and Tourism.

=== Directly affiliated institutions ===
- Qinghai Radio and Television
- Qinghai Nonferrous Geology and Mineral Exploration Bureau
- Qinghai Province Supply and Marketing Cooperatives Federation
- Qinghai Provincial Bureau of Geology and Mineral Exploration and Development
- Qinghai Provincial Social Insurance Service Bureau

=== Dispatched agencies ===
- Sanjiangyuan National Park Administration (Sanjiangyuan State-owned Natural Resources Assets Administration)
- Qinghai Lake Scenic Area Protection and Utilization Administration
- Xining Economic and Technological Development Zone Management Committee
- Qinghai Province Qaidam Circular Economy Experimental Zone Management Committee
- Qinghai Province Haidong Industrial Park Management Committee
- Qinghai Provincial People's Government Office in Beijing
- Qinghai Provincial People's Government Office in Shanghai
- Qinghai Provincial People's Government Office in Shenzhen
- Qinghai Provincial People's Government Office in Xi'an

== See also ==
- Politics of Qinghai
  - Qinghai Provincial People's Congress
  - Qinghai Provincial People's Government
    - Governor of Qinghai
  - Qinghai Provincial Committee of the Chinese Communist Party
    - Party Secretary of Qinghai
  - Qinghai Provincial Committee of the Chinese People's Political Consultative Conference
