= Governor of Qinghai =

Governor of the Qinghai Provincial People's Government
- 青海省人民政府省长
- National Emblem of China

- Flag of China
- Incumbent; Zhuge Yujie; Acting since 30 October 2026
- Qinghai Provincial People's Government
- Type: Governor
- Status: Provincial and ministerial-level official
- Reports to: Qinghai Provincial People's Congress and its Standing Committee
- Nominator: Presidium of the Qinghai Provincial People's Congress
- Appointer: Qinghai Provincial People's Congress
- Term length: Five years, renewable
- Inaugural holder: Zhao Shoushan
- Formation: January 1950
- Deputy: Deputy Governors; Secretary-General

The governor of Qinghai, officially the Governor of the Qinghai Provincial People's Government, is the head of Qinghai Province and leader of the Qinghai Provincial People's Government.

The governor is elected by the Qinghai Provincial People's Congress, and responsible to it and its Standing Committee. The governor is a provincial level official and is responsible for the overall decision-making of the provincial government. The governor is assisted by an executive vice governor as well as several vice governors. The governor generally serves as the deputy secretary of the Qinghai Provincial Committee of the Chinese Communist Party and as a member of the CCP Central Committee. The governor is the second highest-ranking official in the province after the secretary of the CCP Qinghai Committee. The current governor is Zhuge Yujie, who took office on 30 October 2026.

== List of governors ==
=== People's Republic of China ===
No.	Officeholder	Term of office		Party	Ref.
No.	Officeholder	Took office	Left office	Party	Ref.
Governor of the Qinghai Provincial People's Government
1	Zhao Shoushan (1894–1965)	January 1950	November 1952	Chinese Communist Party	
2	Zhang Zhongliang (1907–1983)	November 1952	June 1954	Chinese Communist Party	
3	Sun Zuobin (1909–2002)	June 1954	December 1954	Chinese Communist Party	
Governor of the Qinghai Provincial People's Committee
(3)	Sun Zuobin (1909–2002)	December 1954	March 1958	Chinese Communist Party	
–	Sun Junyi (1911–1967)	March 1958	June 1958	Chinese Communist Party	
4	Yuan Renyuan (1898–1986)	June 1958	June 1962	Chinese Communist Party	
5	Wang Zhao (1917–1970)	June 1962	March 1967	Chinese Communist Party	
Director of the Qinghai Revolutionary Committee
6	Liu Xianquan (1915–1992)	November 1967	February 1977	Chinese Communist Party	
7	Tan Qilong (1913–2003)	February 1977	April 1979	Chinese Communist Party	
9	Zhang Guosheng (1912–1997)	April 1979	December 1982	Chinese Communist Party	
Governor of the Qinghai Provincial People's Government
10	Huang Jingbo (1919–2014)	December 1982	August 1985	Chinese Communist Party	
11	Song Ruixiang (born 1939)	August 1985	November 1989	Chinese Communist Party	
12	Jin Jipeng (1934–2009)	November 1989	December 1992	Chinese Communist Party	
13	Tian Chengping (born 1945)	December 1992	April 1997	Chinese Communist Party	
14	Bai Enpei (born 1946)	April 1997	August 1999	Chinese Communist Party	
15	Zhao Leji (born 1958)	16 August 1999	20 October 2003	Chinese Communist Party	
16	Yang Chuantang (born 1954)	20 October 2003	23 December 2004	Chinese Communist Party	
17	Song Xiuyan (born 1955)	December 2004	January 2010	Chinese Communist Party	
18	Luo Huining (born 1954)	30 June 2010	28 March 2013	Chinese Communist Party	
19	Hao Peng (born 1960)	28 April 2013	20 December 2016	Chinese Communist Party	
20	Wang Jianjun (born 1958)	20 December 2016	7 August 2018	Chinese Communist Party	
21	Liu Ning (born 1962)	7 August 2018	22 July 2020	Chinese Communist Party	
22	Xin Changxing (born 1956)	1 August 2020	31 March 2022	Chinese Communist Party	
23	Wu Xiaojun (born 1966)	31 March 2022	3 December 2020	Chinese Communist Party	
24	Luo Dongchuan (born 1965)	4 January 2025	30 October 2026	Chinese Communist Party	
25	Zhuge Yujie (born 1971)	30 October 2026	Incumbent	Chinese Communist Party	
