= Mao Xiaobing =

Chinese politician

- 毛小兵

Communist Party Secretary of Xining
- In office December 2011 – April 2014
- Preceded by: Wang Jianjun
- Succeeded by: Wang Jianjun

Mayor of Xining
- In office April 2009 – February 2011
- Preceded by: Luo Yulin
- Succeeded by: Wang Yubo

Chairman of Western Mining Company
- In office 2006–2009
- Preceded by: New title
- Succeeded by: Wang Haitao

Personal details
- Born: April 1965 (age 61) Changde, Hunan, China
- Party: Chinese Communist Party (1984–2014; expelled)
- Education: University of Science and Technology Beijing; Central South University

Mao Xiaobing (Chinese: 毛小兵; pinyin: Máo Xiǎobīng; born April 1965) is a former Chinese politician and mining executive. He was the Communist Party Secretary of Xining, capital of Qinghai province, and former chief executive of Western Mining Company, a diversified natural resources company with a large portfolio projects in China's western interior. Mao was investigated for corruption by the Communist Party's top anti-graft body in April 2014, and was expelled from the party three months later for abuse of power and other offenses.

== Early life and education ==
Mao was born and raised in Changde, Hunan, he received his Bachelor of Engineering degree from University of Science and Technology Beijing, in July 1985, majoring in Industrial automation at the Department of Automation.

== Career ==
Mao joined the Chinese Communist Party in December 1984 and became involved in politics in July 1985.

From July 1985 to April 2000, Mao worked in the China Nonferrous Metals Industry Corporation, a state-owned company under the jurisdiction of the State Council of the People's Republic of China. From April 2000 to April 2009, Mao worked as the chief executive of Western Mining Company, a large state-owned natural resources company. At the same times, Mao studied at Central Party School of the Chinese Communist Party, he also earned a doctor of engineering from Central South University.

In April 2009 he was promoted to become the acting mayor and CPC Party vice-secretary of Xi'ning, a position he held until December 2011. In December 2011, Mao was elevated to the CPC Party Secretary of Xi'ning, capital city of Qinghai province, he was appointed to the Party Standing Committee of Qinghai province in May 2012.

Mao was a member of the 10th National Committee of the Chinese People's Political Consultative Conference, and a member of the 11th National People's Congress. Mao is also the former vice-president of China Chamber of International Commerce (CCOIC), the managing director of China Association of Young Entrepreneurs and China Non-Ferrous Metals Industry Association, he was a member of All-China Youth Federation. Prior to his investigation, Mao was also a part-time professor at the China University of Geosciences and University of Science and Technology Beijing, he also a guest professor at the Guizhou University.

Mao Xiaobing is from Mao Zedong's home province of Hunan, but is not related to the chairman.

== Downfall ==
On April 24, 2014, Mao was being investigated by the Central Commission for Discipline Inspection for "serious violations of laws and regulations". Mao was subject to many formal complaints filed online for alleged abuses during his term in office and his time at the helm of Western Mining Company. The party investigation, concluded on July 16, concluded that Mao "abused his power for the illicit gain of others, solicited and accepted huge bribes" and "committed adultery." Mao was expelled from the Chinese Communist Party; his criminal case was moved to prosecution agencies for processing. He was sentenced for life in prison on May 11, 2017.

Business positions
New title	Chairman of Western Mining Company; 2006–2009	Succeeded by Wang Haitao (汪海涛)
Government offices
Preceded by Luo Yulin (骆玉林)	Mayor of Xining; 2009–2011	Succeeded by Wang Yubo (王予波)
Party political offices
Preceded by Wang Jianjun	Communist Party Secretary of Xining; 2011–2014	Succeeded by Wang Jianjun
