= Yin Kesheng =

Chinese politician

- 尹克升

Party Secretary of Qinghai
- In office July 1985 – March 1997
- Deputy: Song Ruixiang; Jin Jipeng; Tian Chengping
- Preceded by: Zhao Haifeng
- Succeeded by: Tian Chengping

Personal details
- Born: March 1932 Tong County, Hebei, China
- Died: 19 May 2011 (aged 79) Beijing, China
- Party: Chinese Communist Party
- Education: Beijing Petroleum Institute; North China People's Revolutionary University

Yin Kesheng (Chinese: 尹克升; pinyin: Yǐn Kèshēng; March 1932 – 19 May 2011) was a Chinese politician who served as Party Secretary of Qinghai from 1985 to 1997.

He was a member of the 12th, 13th and 14th Central Committee of the Chinese Communist Party. He was a delegate to the 8th National People's Congress and a member of the Standing Committee of the 9th National People's Congress.

== Biography ==
Yin was born in Tong County, Hebei (now Tongzhou District, Beijing), in March 1932. He graduated from North China People's Revolutionary University and Beijing Petroleum Institute (now China University of Petroleum).

He entered the workforce in March 1949, and joined the Chinese Communist Party (CCP) in June 1953. In 1956, he was assigned to the Qinghai Provincial Petroleum Bureau, and eventually becoming its director in 1979. In February 1983, he was admitted to member of the Standing Committee of the CCP Qinghai Provincial Committee, the province's top authority. Two months later, he was appointed vice governor of Qinghai. In July 1985, he was promoted to party secretary, the top political position in the province, and held that office until March 1997.

He became deputy secretary of the Work Committee of Departments under the CCP Central Committee in February 1997, and served until April 1998. In March 1998, he took office as vice chairperson of the National People's Congress Ethnic Affairs Committee, serving in the post until his retirement in March 2003.

On 19 May 2011, he died from an illness in Beijing, at the age of 79.

Party political offices
Preceded by Zhao Haifeng	Party Secretary of Qinghai; 1985–1997	Succeeded by Tian Chengping
