= Liu Wei (politician, born 1965) =

Chinese politician

- 刘伟
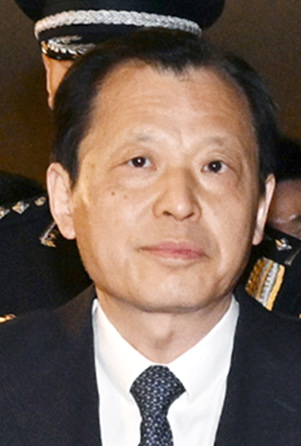

Minister of Transport
- Incumbent
- Assumed office 8 November 2024
- Premier: Li Qiang
- Preceded by: Li Xiaopeng

Specifically-designated Deputy Party Secretary of Beijing
- In office December 29, 2022 – 2024
- Party Secretary: Yin Li
- Preceded by: Yin Yong
- Succeeded by: TBA

Specifically-designated Deputy Party Secretary of Jilin
- In office April 2022 – December 2022
- Party Secretary: Jing Junhai
- Preceded by: Gao Guangbin
- Succeeded by: Wu Haiying

Personal details
- Born: June 1965 (age 61) Zhecheng County, Henan, China
- Party: Chinese Communist Party
- Education: Shangqiu Normal University; Zhengzhou University; Fudan University

Chinese name
- Simplified Chinese: 刘伟
- Traditional Chinese: 劉偉
Transcriptions
Standard Mandarin
- Hanyu Pinyin: Liú Wěi

Liu Wei (Chinese: 刘伟; born June 1965) is a Chinese politician, currently serving as the minister of transport. He previously served as vice governor of Henan, vice minister of Emergency Management, deputy party secretary of Jilin, and deputy party secretary of Beijing.

He is a representative of the 20th National Congress of the Chinese Communist Party and a member of the 20th Central Committee of the Chinese Communist Party.

== Biography ==
Liu was born in Zhecheng County, Henan, in June 1965. In 1980, he entered Shangqiu Normal School (now Shangqiu Normal University), where he majored in chemistry. After graduating in 1983, Liu taught at Zhecheng County High School. In March 1985, he became a technician at Zhecheng County Fertilizer Plant. He did his postgraduate work at the Department of Chemistry, Zhengzhou University from August 1987 to July 1990. He also received his doctor's degree in economic from Fudan University in June 2004.

Liu got involved in politics in July 1990, when he was despatched as an official in the Henan Provincial Petrochemical Department (now Henan Provincial Petrochemical Industry Management Office), where he eventually became deputy director in June 2000. He joined the Chinese Communist Party (CCP) in June 1997. Liu was assigned to Henan Development and Reform Commission in February 2004. He moved up the ranks to become deputy director in August 2004 and director in January 2007. He also served as vice governor of Henan from January 2018 to January 2020 and party secretary of the CCP Henan Provincial State owned Assets Supervision and Administration Commission Committee from March 2018 to November 2018.

In January 2020, Liu was transferred to the central government and appointed vice minister of Emergency Management, a position at vice-ministerial level.

In April 2022, Liu was appointed deputy party secretary of Jilin, succeeding Gao Guangbin.

On December 29, 2022, Liu was appointed deputy party secretary of Beijing, succeeding Yin Yong.

On September 27, 2024, Liu was made party branch secretary of the Ministry of Transport, succeeding Li Xiaopeng. On November 8, he was appointed minister of transport by the National People's Congress.

Government offices
Preceded by Sun Tingxi	Director of Henan Development and Reform Commission; 2017–2018	Succeeded by He Xiong
Preceded by Li Xiaopeng	Minister of Transport; 2024–present	Incumbent
Party political offices
Preceded by Gao Guangbin	Specifically-designated Deputy Communist Party Secretary of Jilin; 2022	Vacant
Preceded by Yin Yong	Specifically-designated Deputy Communist Party Secretary of Beijing; 2022–2024	Succeeded by TBA
