= Western Mining =

Western Mining can refer to:

- Western Mining Co., Ltd., a Chinese mining company.
- Western Mining Corporation, a now defunct Australian mining company.
- Western Mining and Railroad Museum, a mining museum in Utah.
