= Zhaxi Wangqug =

Chinese politician

- བཀྲ་ཤིས་དབང་ཕྱུག་

Chairman of Qinghai People's Congress
- In office November 1981 – April 1983
- Preceded by: Ji Chunguang
- Succeeded by: Song Lin

Chairman of the Qinghai Provincial Committee of the Chinese People's Political Consultative Conference
- In office September 1979 – November 1981
- Preceded by: Tan Qilong
- Succeeded by: Zhao Haifeng

Personal details
- Born: 28 July 1913 Zhanhua County, Xikang, China (now in Garzê, Sichuan, China)
- Died: 16 October 2003 (aged 90) Beijing, China
- Party: Chinese Communist Party
- Spouse: Zhou Shufan
- Education: Minzu University of China

Military service
- Allegiance: People's Republic of China
- Branch/service: Red Army; People's Liberation Army Ground Force
- Years of service: 1935–1949
- Unit: Fourth Front Army of the Chinese Workers' and Peasants' Red Army; Second Front Army of the Chinese Workers' and Peasants' Red Army

Chinese name
- Chinese: 扎喜旺徐
Transcriptions
Standard Mandarin
- Hanyu Pinyin: Zhāxǐ Wàngxú

Zhaxi Wangqug (Tibetan: བཀྲ་ཤིས་དབང་ཕྱུག་, Wylie: bkra shis dbang phyug; Chinese: 扎喜旺徐; 28 July 1913 – 16 October 2003) was a Chinese politician of Tibetan ethnicity who served as chairman of the Qinghai Provincial Committee of the Chinese People's Political Consultative Conference from 1979 to 1981 and chairman of Qinghai People's Congress from 1981 to 1983.

He was a representative of the 8th National Congress of the Chinese Communist Party. He was delegates to the 1st, 2nd, 3rd, 4th, 5th, 6th and 7th National People's Congresses. He was members of the 6th and 7th Standing Committees of the National People's Congress. He was members of the 4th and 5th National Committees of the Chinese People's Political Consultative Conference.

== Biography ==
Zhaxi Wangqug was born into a herdsman family in Zhanhua County (now Xinlong County), Xikang, on 28 July 1913.

In early 1935, the Fourth Front Army of the Chinese Workers' and Peasants' Red Army set up the Tibetan People's Republic in Garzê County. Zhaxi Wangqug became company commander of a troop of cavalry. On 2 July 1936, the Second Front Army of the Chinese Workers' and Peasants' Red Army arrived in Garzê County and successfully met with the Fourth Front Army. Soon, the Fourth Front Army went north first, and Zhaxi Wangqug stayed to prepare food and other materials for the Second Front Army. In August 1936, he took part in the Long March under He Long, becoming the only Tibetan soldier in the Second Front Army. In 1938, he came to Yan'an, where he studied at Yan'an Institute for Nationalities (now Minzu University of China). He joined the Chinese Communist Party in that year.

After the Second Sino-Japanese War, he worked in north China's Inner Mongolia.

After the liberation of Xining in September 1949, Zhaxi Wangqug led a working group to Golog area, and Golog was peacefully liberated by the People's Liberation Army.

In December 1951, Zhaxi Wangqug took the leaders of Golog to Beijing and was received by Mao Zedong. On 1 January 1954, Golog Tibetan Autonomous Prefecture was established, with Zhaxi Wangqug as the founding governor. In September 1954, he was unanimously chosen as a delegate to the 1st National People's Congress. In December of that same year, he rose to become vice governor of Qinghai.

In May 1958, he was labeled as one of the "Two Local Protectionist Figures" with Feng Baiju and brought to be persecuted. In 1964, he was appointed head of Political and Legal Department of the Central People's Commission, but having held the position for only two years. In 1966, the Cultural Revolution broke out, Zhaxi Wangqug was denounced as a "capitalist roader" and "local nationalism", and was sent to the May Seventh Cadre Schools to do farm works in Jilin and Hubei provinces. In 1972, under the help of Premier Zhou Enlai, he returned to Beijing and was reinstated.

After the Cultural Revolution in 1979, he was appointed vice governor and deputy party secretary of Qinghai. In September 1979, he was appointed chairman of the Qinghai Provincial Committee of the Chinese People's Political Consultative Conference, he remained in that position until November 1981, when he took office as chairman of Qinghai People's Congress.

On 16 October 2003, he died from an illness in Beijing, at the age of 90.

Assembly seats
Preceded by Tan Qilong	Chairman of the Qinghai Provincial Committee of the Chinese People's Political Consultative Conference; 1979–1981	Succeeded by Zhao Haifeng
Preceded by Ji Chunguang	Chairman of Qinghai People's Congress; 1981–1983	Succeeded by Song Lin
