= Zhao Shoushan =

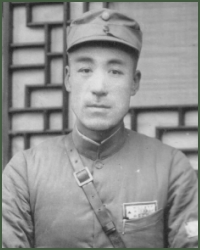
Zhao Shoushan

Zhao Shoushan (simplified Chinese: 赵寿山; traditional Chinese: 趙壽山; pinyin: Zhào Shòushān; 12 November 1894 – 20 June 1965) was a KMT general and later Chinese Communist Party politician. He is rumored to be of the same family than Zhao Leji.

== Career ==
Zhao Shoushan was born in Hu County, Shaanxi in 1894.

He joined the People's Liberation Army in 1948 and became Deputy Commanding Officer of the Northwestern Field Army in 1949. In 1949, Zhao also became Deputy Commanding Officer of the 1st Field Army.

After the foundation of the People's Republic of China, Zhao was the CCP Chairman of Qinghai from 1950 to 1952 and Governor of Shaanxi from 1952 to 1959. In 1965, he was a member of the National Defense Committee and subsequently becoming a member of the Standing Committee, National People's Congress.

Political offices
Preceded by Ma Bufang	Governor of Qinghai; 1950–1952	Succeeded by Zhang Zhongliang
Preceded by Zhang Zhongliang	Party Secretary of Qinghai; 1952	Succeeded by Gao Feng
Preceded by Ma Mingfang	Governor of Shaanxi; 1952–1959	Succeeded by Zhao Bonian
