= Wang Jianjun (politician, born 1958) =

Chinese politician

- 王建军
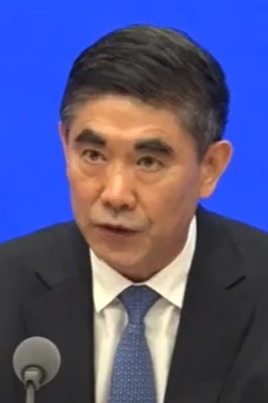
- Wang in 2019

Party Secretary of Qinghai
- In office March 2018 – March 2022
- Deputy: Liu Ning (Governor)
- Preceded by: Wang Guosheng
- Succeeded by: Xin Changxing

Chairman of Qinghai Provincial People's Congress
- In office 21 September 2018 – 28 May 2022
- Preceded by: Wang Guosheng
- Succeeded by: Xin Changxing

Governor of Qinghai
- In office 20 December 2016 – 7 August 2018
- Preceded by: Hao Peng
- Succeeded by: Liu Ning

Personal details
- Born: June 1958 (age 68) Yun County, Hubei, China
- Party: Chinese Communist Party
- Education: Qinghai Normal University; Central Party School

Chinese name
- Simplified Chinese: 王建军
- Traditional Chinese: 王建軍
Transcriptions
Standard Mandarin
- Hanyu Pinyin: Wáng Jiànjūn

Wang Jianjun (born June 1958; Chinese: 王建军; pinyin: Wáng Jiànjūn) is a Chinese provincial politician who served as the Party Secretary of Qinghai from 2018 to 2022.

== Career ==
Wang was born in Yun County (now Yunyang District of Shiyan City) in Hubei Province. He joined the Communist Party in March 1984. He holds a graduate degree from the Central Party School.

Wang is a career party functionary. He has served as the deputy head of the Qinghai Organization Department, the Director of Personnel of Qinghai, the head of the institutional reform office of Qinghai, and the secretary-general of the Qinghai Party Committee. In August 2005, he was admitted to the Qinghai Provincial Party Standing Committee. In January 2007 he was named party chief of the provincial capital Xining. In September 2010, he became deputy party chief of Qinghai. In 2011, he was named head of the provincial Zhengfawei (Political and Legal Affairs Commission). He was again named party chief of Xining following the corruption investigation of Mao Xiaobing; he served until May 2015. In December 2016, Wang was appointed as the Governor of Qinghai. He was appointed as the Party Secretary in March 2018. On April 20, 2022, he was made vice chairperson of the National People's Congress Social Development Affairs Committee.

Wang is an alternate of the 18th Central Committee of the Chinese Communist Party, and a full member of the 19th Central Committee of the Chinese Communist Party.

Party political offices
Preceded by Liu Weiping	Secretary-General of Qinghai Provincial Committee of the Chinese Communist Party; 2004–2007	Succeeded by Shen He (沈何)
Preceded by Zhang Yijiong	Party Secretary of Xining; 2007–2011	Succeeded by Mao Xiaobing
Preceded by Luo Huining	Specifically-designated Deputy Party Secretary of Qinghai; 2010–2016	Succeeded by Liu Ning
Preceded by Li Pengxin	Secretary of the Political and Legal Committee of the CCP Qinghai Provincial Committee; 2011–2013	Succeeded by Wang Lingjun
Preceded by Mao Xiaobing	Party Secretary of Xining; 2014–2015	Succeeded by Wang Xiao
Preceded by Wang Guosheng	Party Secretary of Qinghai; 2018–2022	Succeeded by Xin Changxing
Government offices
Preceded by Hao Peng	Governor of Qinghai; 2016–2018	Succeeded by Liu Ning
Party political offices
Preceded by Wang Guosheng	Chairman of Qinghai Provincial People's Congress; 2018–2022	Succeeded by Xin Changxing
