= Li Xiaopeng (politician) =

Chinese businessman and politician

- 李小鹏
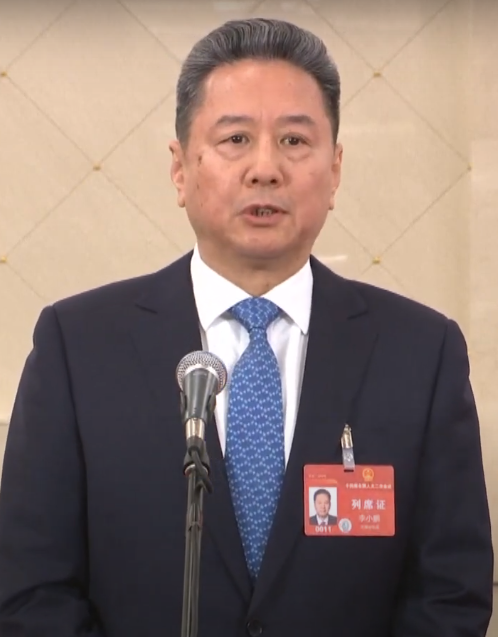
- Li in 2024

Minister of Transport
- In office 3 September 2016 – 8 November 2024
- Premier: Li Keqiang; Li Qiang
- Deputy: Feng Zhenglin
- Preceded by: Yang Chuantang
- Succeeded by: Liu Wei

Governor of Shanxi
- In office 29 January 2013 – 30 August 2016
- Deputy: Gao Jianmin
- Party Secretary: Yuan Chunqing; Wang Rulin; Luo Huining
- Preceded by: Wang Jun
- Succeeded by: Lou Yangsheng

Personal details
- Born: June 7, 1959 (age 67) Peking Union Medical College Hospital, Dong Cheng District, Beijing, China
- Party: Chinese Communist Party
- Relations: Li Peng (father); Zhu Lin (mother); Li Xiaolin (sister); Li Xiaoyong (brother)
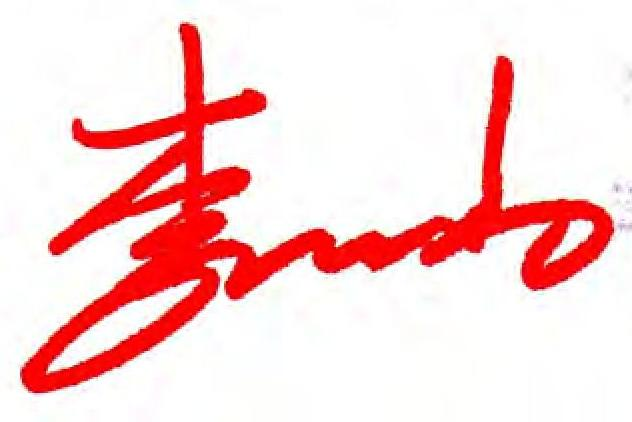
- Signature

Li Xiaopeng (Chinese: 李小鹏; born 7 June 1959) is a Chinese businessman and politician, who served as the Minister of Transport from 2016 to 2024. He is the former chief executive of China Huaneng Group, a power generation company. He was also Governor of Shanxi between 2012 and 2016. As the son of former Chinese Premier Li Peng, he is a prominent member of the faction known in Chinese politics as the princelings.

== Early life and career ==
On 7 June 1959, Li was born at the Peking Union Medical College Hospital in Dong Cheng District, Beijing, the eldest son from three children of Li Peng, an electrical engineer, and Zhu Lin, a Russian-language translator. Li is the eldest child of his parents. His sister, Li Xiaolin, was born two years later. Both children were named after their parents by simply appending the middle character xiao to their names (literally meaning "little"), so Li Xiaopeng's name can be taken to mean "little Li Peng" or "Li Peng, Jr.". Both Li Xiaopeng and Li Xiaolin took after their father and studied electricity-related professions in university. He is a graduate of the North China Electric Power University.

In 1982, Li went to work at the China Electric Power Research Institutethe, the country's top institute specializing in the study of power generation. He was rapidly promoted in the institute and earned his professional engineer designation. He was also sent to visit and study at Ontario Hydro, the Manitoba HVDC Research Centre, and the University of Manitoba in Canada. In 1991, Li joined Huaneng International Power Development Corporation, becoming assistant to the General Manager and beginning his career in business. In March 1999, Li Xiaopeng became chairman and CEO of Huaneng International Power Development Corporation, and Chairman and CEO of HKSE listed Huaneng Power International. In December 1999, he added another title as board member and CEO of China Huaneng Group. In July 2000, Huaneng Power International completed the acquisition of NYSE listed Huaneng Shandong Power Generation Co Ltd, making it the largest independent power producer in Asia. As Chairman of Huaneng Power International, Li Xiaopeng has been described as the forthcoming "King of Power in Asia".

In December 2001, Li was appointed deputy general manager of State Power Corporation of China and Chairman and CEO of China Huaneng Group. Under Li Xiaopeng's leadership, the China Huaneng Group has consistently ranked first among China's "Five Major Power Generation Central Enterprises" (the other four are: China Datang, China Guodian, China Huadian, and China Power Investment Corporation).

== Shanxi ==
In May 2008, Li was appointed to the Shanxi Provincial Party Standing Committee, joining the province's elite council of politicians. In less than a month, on June 12, Li was appointed Vice-Governor of Shanxi at the 3rd session of the Standing Committee of the 11th People's Congress of Shanxi province. He was specifically responsible for commerce, market regulation, foreign affairs, and tourism of the province. In June 2010, Li was appointed Executive Vice-Governor of Shanxi. In December 2012, he was promoted to acting governor of Shanxi, replacing Wang Jun, who went on to become Party Secretary of neighbouring Inner Mongolia. On 29 January 2013, the first session of the 12th People's Congress of Shanxi province officially elected Li Xiaopeng as the governor of Shanxi.

Li Xiaopeng's term as Governor has been marked with instability in the provincial party organization; between 2013 and 2014, several senior provincial officials fell as part of a corruption probe.

In January 2015, the Shanxi government website made changes to the "division of labour" among the highest officers of the provincial government, reducing Li's purview to only "oversee overall work of the provincial government." It was generally considered customary for the governor to also directly oversee the departments for supervision, audit, and state-owned enterprise management (guoziwei), which is typically defined explicitly on the websites. Outside observers saw this move as an indication that Li Xiaopeng's power had been curtailed. During his governorship, he welcomed two new party secretaries, Wang Rulin and Luo Huining, while being unable to ascend to the post of provincial party chief himself, as was customarily expected in other Chinese provinces.

Li is an alternate of the 18th Central Committee of the Chinese Communist Party. He is ranked last on the list, which is arranged by votes received in favour at the 18th Party Congress.

== Minister of Transport ==
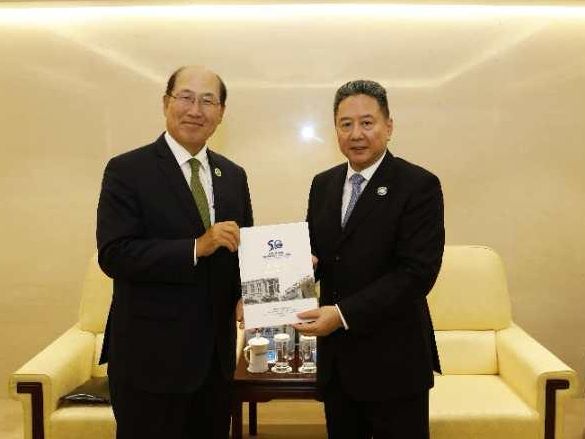
Li with International Maritime Organization Secretary-General Kitack Lim, September 26, 2021

On 3 September 2016, Li Xiaopeng was appointed as the Minister of Transport by the Standing Committee of the National People's Congress, and replaced Yang Chuantang. On 10 May 2023, he succeeded Yang Chuantang as the Communist Party Secretary of the Ministry of Transport.

On 27 September 2024, he was succeeded by Liu Wei as the Communist Party Secretary of the Ministry of Transport. On 11 October 2024, Li was appointed as a deputy director of the Committee for Economic Affairs of the National Committee of the Chinese People's Political Consultative Conference.

Business positions
Preceded by Huang Jinkai (黄金凯)	Chairman of Huaneng Power International; 1999–2008	Succeeded by Huang Yongda
New title	General Manager of China Huaneng Group; 2002–2008	Succeeded by Cao Peixi
Government offices
Preceded by Shen Lianbin	Executive Vice Governor of Shanxi; 2010–2013	Succeeded by Gao Jianmin
Preceded by Wang Jun	Governor of Shanxi; 2013–2016	Succeeded by Lou Yangsheng
Preceded by Yang Chuantang	Minister of Transport; 2016–2024	Succeeded by Liu Wei
