= Song Ruixiang =

Chinese politician

- 宋瑞祥

Director of the China Earthquake Administration
- In office January 2002 – December 2004
- Premier: Zhu Rongji
- Preceded by: Chen Zhangli
- Succeeded by: Chen Jianmin

Minister of Geology and Mineral Resources
- In office April 1994 – March 1998
- Premier: Li Peng; Zhu Rongji
- Preceded by: Zhu Xun
- Succeeded by: Position revoked

Governor of Qinghai
- In office July 1985 – September 1989
- Party Secretary: Yin Kesheng
- Preceded by: Huang Jingbo
- Succeeded by: Jin Jipeng

Personal details
- Born: October 1939 (age 86) Jintan County, Jiangsu, China
- Party: Chinese Communist Party

Song Ruixiang (Chinese: 宋瑞祥; pinyin: Sòng Ruìxiáng; born October 1939) is a Chinese politician who served as governor of Qinghai from 1985 to 1989, minister of geology and mineral resources from 1994 to 1998, and director of the China Earthquake Administration from 2002 to 2004.

He was a member of the 15th Central Committee of the Chinese Communist Party and a member of the Standing Committee of the 10th Chinese People's Political Consultative Conference.

== Biography ==
Song was born in Jintan County (now Jintan District of Changzhou), Jiangsu, in October 1939.

Starting in 1957, he successively served as technician, engineer, deputy division director, and deputy director of the Hunan Provincial Geological Bureau. He was deputy director and then director of the Qinghai Provincial Bureau of Geology and Mineral Resources from April 1982 to June 1985. In July 1985, he was promoted to become deputy party secretary and governor of Qinghai, and served until September 1989. In October 1989, he became vice minister of geology and mineral resources, rising to minister in April 1994. He was appointed director of the State Environmental Protection Administration in April 1998, concurrently holding the deputy director of the National Mineral Resources Commission position. He was chosen as director of the China Earthquake Administration in January 2002, and held that office until December 2004. He retired in December 2009.

Government offices
Preceded by Huang Jingbo	Governor of Qinghai; 1985–1989	Succeeded by Jin Jipeng
Preceded by Zhu Xun	Minister of Geology and Mineral Resources; 1994–1998	Succeeded by Position revoked
Preceded by Chen Zhangli	Director of the China Earthquake Administration; 2002–2004	Succeeded by Chen Jianmin (陈建民)
