= Qiang Wei =

Chinese politician

- 强卫

Party Secretary of Jiangxi
- In office March 2013 – June 2016
- Deputy: Lu Xinshe (Governor)
- Preceded by: Su Rong
- Succeeded by: Lu Xinshe

Party Secretary of Qinghai
- In office March 2007 – March 2013
- Deputy: Song Xiuyan (Governor 2004–2010); Luo Huining (Governor 2010–2013)
- Preceded by: Zhao Leji
- Succeeded by: Luo Huining

Personal details
- Born: March 1953 (age 73) Wuxi, Jiangsu
- Party: Chinese Communist Party
- Education: University of Science and Technology of China
- Profession: Politician

Qiang Wei
- Simplified Chinese: 强卫
- Traditional Chinese: 強衛
Transcriptions
Standard Mandarin
- Hanyu Pinyin: Qiáng Wèi

Qiang Wei (born March 1953) is a Chinese politician and senior regional official. He is serving as vice-chairperson of National People's Congress Internal and Judicial Affairs Committee. Previously, he served as the Party Secretary of Jiangxi between 2013 and 2016. He spent much of his earlier political career in Beijing as a key leader of its law-enforcement institutions, including the Beijing Political and Legislative Affairs Commission (Zhengfawei) and the Beijing Public Security Bureau. He also served as the party chief of Qinghai province.

== Early life and career ==
Qiang was born in Wuxi, Jiangsu, in 1953. Qiang Wei joined the Chinese Communist Party in March 1975, and graduated from University of Science and Technology of China with a master's degree in economic management.

Beginning in 1969, when he was only 16, Qiang enlisted in the People's Liberation Army at the military mechanic workshop of a naval base in Fujian province. He served there during much of the Cultural Revolution. He was then employed by Beijing Chemical Engineering Factory and later promoted to deputy head of the sixth laboratory of Beijing Research Institute of Chemical Reagents and later deputy director of the institute. He subsequently became the CCP Party Chief of Beijing Chemical Engineering Factory.

== Political career ==
In June 1987, he was appointed to lead the Communist Youth League organization in Beijing as its secretary. In December 1990, he became the Party Secretary of Shijingshan District of Beijing (prefecture-level), as well as the chairman of the district's People's Congress. Qiang gained a seat on the Standing Committee of the CCP Beijing Committee in December 1992, and the secretary of Beijing municipal construction commission in January 1993. In March 1994 he became the head of the Beijing Publicity Department.

In February 1995, Qiang was appointed the secretary of the Beijing Political and Legal Affairs Commission and the head of the Beijing Public Security Bureau, effectively making him Beijing's police chief. He was awarded the rank of "lieutenant general police commander" in 1995. In March 2001, he was promoted to become Deputy Party Secretary of Beijing.

In January 2006, he became the Secretary of Commission for Discipline Inspection of Beijing, in addition to continuing his role as the Secretary of Beijing Political and Legal Affairs Commission. In March 2007, Qiang took over from Zhao Leji to become the party chief of inland Qinghai province. In March 2013, following the 18th Party Congress, Qiang was transferred to Jiangxi to become its provincial party chief, replacing Su Rong. In 2014 Su Rong was detained for a corruption investigation. In June 2016, Qiang departed from his post as party chief of Jiangxi.

On 2 July 2016, Qiang was appointed vice-chairperson of National People's Congress Internal and Judicial Affairs Committee.

Qiang was an alternate member of 16th Central Committee of the Chinese Communist Party, and a member of the 17th and 18th Central Committees.
