= Party Secretary of Qinghai =

Provincial government position in China

Secretary of the Qinghai Provincial Committee of the Chinese Communist Party
- 中国共产党青海省委员会书记
- Emblem of the Chinese Communist Party

- Flag of the Chinese Communist Party

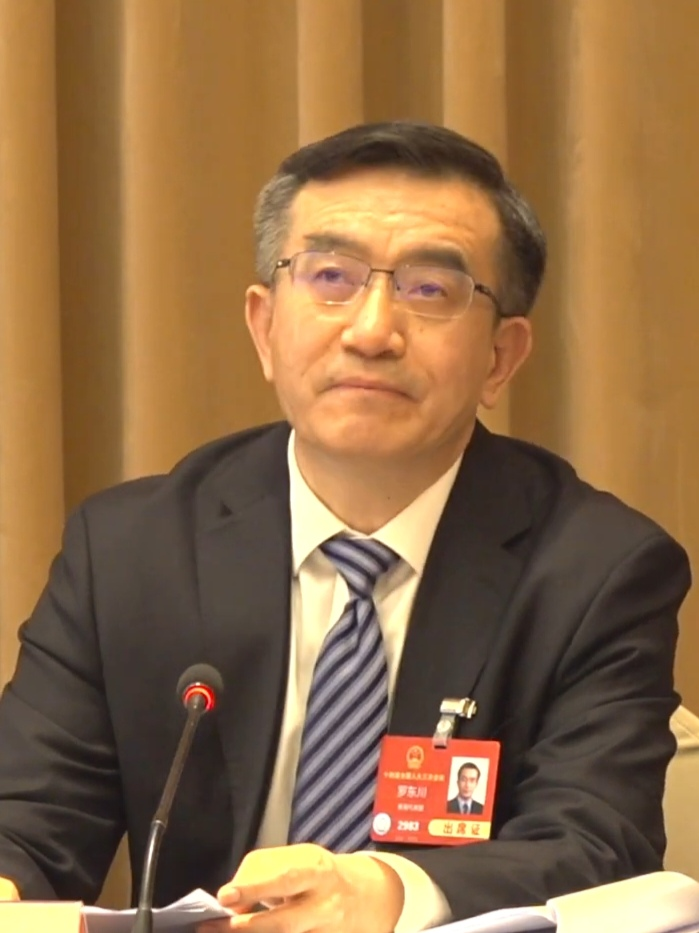
- Incumbent; Luo Dongchuan since 22 September 2026
- Qinghai Provincial Committee of the Chinese Communist Party
- Type: Party Committee Secretary
- Status: Provincial and ministerial-level official
- Member of: Qinghai Provincial Standing Committee
- Nominator: Central Committee
- Appointer: Qinghai Provincial Committee Central Committee
- Inaugural holder: Zhang Zhongliang
- Formation: September 1949
- Deputy: Deputy Secretary; Secretary-General

The secretary of the Qinghai Provincial Committee of the Chinese Communist Party is the leader of the Qinghai Provincial Committee of the Chinese Communist Party (CCP). As the CCP is the sole ruling party of the People's Republic of China (PRC), the secretary is the highest ranking post in Qinghai.

The secretary is officially appointed by the CCP Central Committee based on the recommendation of the CCP Organization Department, which is then approved by the Politburo and its Standing Committee. The secretary can be also appointed by a plenary meeting of the Qinghai Provincial Committee, but the candidate must be the same as the one approved by the central government. The secretary leads the Standing Committee of the Qinghai Provincial Committee, and is usually a member of the CCP Central Committee. The secretary leads the work of the Provincial Committee and its Standing Committee. The secretary is outranks the governor, who is generally the deputy secretary of the committee.

The current secretary is Luo Dongchuan, who took office on 22 September 2026.

== List of party secretaries ==
Image	Name (English)	Name (Chinese)	Term start	Term end	Ref.
	Zhang Zhongliang	张仲良	September 1949	May 1954	
	Gao Feng	高峰	May 1954	August 1961	
	Wang Zhao	王昭	August 1961	November 1962	
	Yang Zhilin	杨植霖	November 1962	May 1966	
	Liu Xianquan	刘贤权	August 1967	February 1977	
	Tan Qilong	谭启龙	February 1977	December 1979	
	Liang Buting	梁步庭	December 1979	December 1982	
	Zhao Haifeng	赵海峰	December 1982	July 1985	
	Yin Kesheng	尹克升	July 1985	March 1997	
	Tian Chengping	田成平	March 1997	June 1999	
	Bai Enpei	白恩培	June 1999	October 2001	
	Su Rong	苏荣	October 2001	19 August 2003	
	Zhao Leji	赵乐际	19 August 2003	26 March 2007	
	Qiang Wei	强卫	26 March 2007	19 March 2013	
	Luo Huining	骆惠宁	19 March 2013	29 June 2016	
	Wang Guosheng	王国生	29 June 2016	21 March 2018	
	Wang Jianjun	王建军	21 March 2018	29 March 2022	
	Xin Changxing	信长星	29 March 2022	3 January 2023	
	Chen Gang	陈刚	3 January 2023	31 December 2024	
	Wu Xiaojun	吴晓军	31 December 2024	22 September 2026	
	Luo Dongchuan	罗东川	22 September 2026	incumbent	
