= Sun Daguang =

Chinese politician

- 孙大光

Minister of Geology and Mineral Resources
- In office 1979–1983
- Premier: Hua Guofeng; Zhao Ziyang
- Preceded by: Li Siguang
- Succeeded by: Zhu Xun

Minister of Transport
- In office 1964–1975
- Premier: Zhou Enlai
- Preceded by: Wang Shoudao
- Succeeded by: Ye Fei

Personal details
- Born: January 7, 1917 Shou County, Anhui, China
- Died: 13 January 2005 (aged 88) Beijing, China
- Party: Chinese Communist Party

Chinese name
- Simplified Chinese: 孙大光
- Traditional Chinese: 孫大光
Transcriptions
Standard Mandarin
- Hanyu Pinyin: Sūn Dàguāng

Sun Daguang (Chinese: 孙大光; 7 January 1917 – 13 January 2005) was a Chinese politician who served as Minister of Transport from 1964 to 1975 and Minister of Geology and Mineral Resources from 1979 to 1983. He was a delegate to the 3rd and 5th National People's Congress. He was a member of the 12th Central Committee of the Chinese Communist Party. He was a member of the 12th Central Committee of the Chinese Communist Party.

== Biography ==
Sun was born into a poor peasant family in Shou County, Anhui, on 7 January 1917.

In 1933, he joined the Communist Youth League of China during his apprenticeship at the Great Wall Bookstore in Shanghai. He joined the Chinese Communist Party (CCP) in 1934 and was transferred to the Jiangsu Provincial Committee of the Communist Youth League of China as a full-time distribution officer. Afterwards, he successively served as head of Organization Department of the Shanghai Hudong District Committee of the Communist Youth League of China and head of the Publicity Department of the Shanghai Hudong District Committee of the Communist Youth League of China, head of the Organization of the CCP Shanghai Zhabei District Committee, inspector of the Jiangsu Provincial Committee of the Communist Youth League of China, and head of Publicity Department of the Jiangsu Temporary Provincial Committee of the Communist Youth League of China.

During the Second Sino-Japanese War, he successively engaged in secret party work in Guangzhou, Chongqing, Guiyang and other places.

After the surrender of the Empire of Japan in 1945, he served as director of the Social Bureau and director of the Education Bureau in Changchun, under the arrangement of the party organization. He continued to engage in secret party work as a member of the Kuomintang, until the liberation of northeast China.

In 1948, he participated in the Land Reform Movement in Inner Mongolia and served as director of the Policy Research Office of the CCP Inner Mongolia Regional PCommittee.

After the establishment of the Communist State in 1949, he successively served as director of the Office of the Transportation Department of Northeast China, director of the Transportation Department of the Office of the Northeast China People's Government, director of the Northeast Navigation Administration, and Dean of Dalian Maritime College and secretary-general of the Transportation Department of Northeast China.

Starting in 1952, he served in several posts in the Ministry of Transport, including director of the Planning Department, assistant minister, vice minister, and executive vice minister. He was elevated to minister in 1964.

During the Cultural Revolution, he was persecuted and imprisoned for more than five and a half years. He was reinstated 1975 as director of the Geological Bureau of the State Development and Reform Commission and subsequently director of the State Geological Administration. In September 1979, he was appointed minister of geology and mineral resources, a position he held until 1983.

In 1985, he became a member of the Central Advisory Commission.

On 13 January 2005, he died from an illness in Beijing, at the age of 88.

Government offices
Preceded by Wang Shoudao	Minister of Transport; 1964–1975	Succeeded by Ye Fei
Preceded by Li Siguang	Minister of Geology and Mineral Resources; 1979–1983	Succeeded by Zhu Xun
