= Li Shenglin =

Chinese politician (born 1946)

Director of the Financial and Economic Affairs Committee of the 12th National People's Congress
- In office March 5, 2013 – March 13, 2018

Deputy Director of the Economic Committee of the 11th National Committee of the Chinese People's Political Consultative Conference
- In office November 22, 2012 – March 13, 2013

Minister of Transport
- In office December 29, 2005 – August 31, 2012
- Preceded by: Zhang Chunxian
- Succeeded by: Yang Chuantang

Personal details
- Born: November 1946 (age 79) Nantong County, Jiangsu
- Party: Chinese Communist Party
- Education: Zhenjiang Agricultural Machinery College
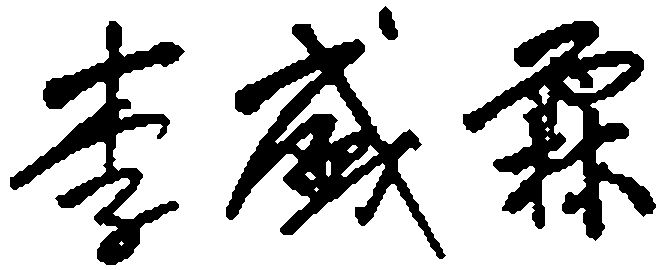
- Signature
- Website: Li Shenglin Biography

Li Shenglin (Chinese: 李盛霖; pinyin: Lǐ Shènglín; born 13 November 1946), a native of Nantong, Jiangsu Province, is a Chinese politician. He has, since 2013, served as the Chair of the Financial and Economic Affairs Committee of the National People's Congress. He was the Minister of Transport from December 2005 to July 2012.

== Biography ==
=== Tianjin ===
From July 1965 to August 1970, Li Shenglin studied in Agricultural Machinery Department of Zhenjiang Agricultural Machinery College (Chinese: 镇江农业机械学院, now Jiangsu University), majoring in agricultural machinery. From August 1970 to October 1972, he was a worker and planner in the tool workshop of Tianjin Tractor Factory. From October 1972 to December 1976, he was an officer, deputy secretary and secretary of the Youth League Committee and secretary of the Party Branch of the Tool Workshop of Tianjin Tractor Factory. In June 1973, he joined the Chinese Communist Party (CCP). In December 1976, he served as deputy manager of Tianjin Chemical Machinery Company to February 1979. In February 1979, he served as deputy head of the technical section and deputy director of the office of Tianjin Tractor Industry Company until November 1980.

From November 1980 to November 1983, he served as a cadre in the Planning Division of the General Office of the Tianjin Municipal Government and head of the Third Division. From November 1983 to October 1986, he served as Deputy Secretary General of the Tianjin Municipal People's Government. From October 1986 to June 1988, he served as Director of the Textile Industry Bureau of Tianjin and Deputy Secretary of the Party Committee. In June 1988, he served as th Director of the Planning Commission and Deputy Secretary of the CCP Tianjin Municipal Committee Planning Work Committee. In October 1991, he served as Deputy Mayor of Tianjin. In May 1993, he served as Deputy Secretary of the CCP Tianjin Municipal Committee and Deputy Mayor of Tianjin. From May 1998 to December 2002, he served as Deputy Secretary of the CCP Tianjin Municipal Committee and Mayor of Tianjin.

=== Beijing ===
From December 2002 to March 2003, he served as deputy director and Deputy Secretary of the Party Group of the National Economic and Trade Commission, and from March 2003, as deputy director of the National Development and Reform Commission.

In December 2005, he became the Minister of Communications (later Ministry of Transport). He was appointed to his post as Minister of Transport in March 2008. He left from that post in July 2012 and was succeeded by Yang Chuantang.

On November 22, 2012, he became a member of the 11th National Committee of the Chinese People's Political Consultative Conference (CPPCC) and deputy director of the Economic Committee. On March 5, 2013, he became the Director of Financial and Economic Affairs Committee of the 12th National People's Congress.

He has been a member of the 15th, 16th and 17th Central Committees of the Chinese Communist Party.

== Awards, honors and recognition ==
Commander's Cross of the Order of Merit of the Republic of Poland (2011)

On December 21, 2011, President of Poland Bronislaw Komorowski, who was on a state visit to China, presented Li Shenglin, then Minister of Transport of China, with the Commander's Cross of the Order of Merit of the Republic of Poland in Beijing in recognition of his outstanding contribution to the development of transport cooperation, trade and economy between China and Poland, especially the Chipolbrok.

Political offices
Preceded by Zhang Lichang	Mayor of Tianjin; 1998–2002	Succeeded by Dai Xianglong
Preceded by Zhang Chunxian	Minister of Transport; 2005–2012	Succeeded by Yang Chuantang
