= Minister of Transport (China) =

Minister of the People's Republic of China

Minister of Transport of the People's Republic of China
- 中华人民共和国交通运输部部长
- National Emblem of China

- Flag of China
- Incumbent; Liu Wei since 8 November 2024
- Ministry of Transport
- Status: Provincial and ministerial-level official
- Member of: Plenary Meeting of the State Council
- Seat: Ministry of Transport Building, Dongcheng District, Beijing
- Nominator: Premier (chosen within the Chinese Communist Party)
- Appointer: President; with the confirmation of the National People's Congress or its Standing Committee
- Formation: 19 October 1949; 77 years ago
- First holder: Zhang Bojun
- Deputy: Vice Minister of Transport

The minister of transport of the People's Republic of China is the head of the Ministry of Transport of the People's Republic of China and a member of the State Council. Within the State Council, the position is eighteenth in order of precedence. The minister is responsible for leading the ministry, presiding over its meetings, and signing important documents related to the ministry. Officially, the minister is nominated by the premier of the State Council, who is then approved by the National People's Congress or its Standing Committee and appointed by the president.

The current minister is Liu Wei, who concurrently serves as the Chinese Communist Party Committee Secretary of the ministry.

== List of ministers ==
No.	Name	Took office	Left office	Ref.
Minister of Communications of the Central People's Government
1	Zhang Bojun	19 October 1949	September 1954	
Minister of Communications of the People's Republic of China
1	Zhang Bojun	September 1954	January 1958	
2	Wang Shoudao	January 1958	July 1964	
3	Sun Daguang	July 1964	January 1975	
4	Ye Fei	January 1975	February 1979	
5	Zeng Sheng	February 1979	March 1981	
6	Peng Deqing	March 1981	May 1982	
7	Li Qing	May 1982	July 1984	
8	Qian Yongchang	July 1984	March 1991	
9	Huang Zhendong	March 1991	October 2002	
10	Zhang Chunxian	October 2002	December 2005	
11	Li Shenglin	December 2005	15 March 2008	
Minister of Transport of the People's Republic of China
1	Li Shenglin	15 March 2008	31 August 2012	
2	Yang Chuantang	31 August 2012	3 September 2016	
3	Li Xiaopeng	3 September 2016	8 November 2024	
4	Liu Wei	8 November 2024	Incumbent	
