= Yang Chuantang =

Chinese politician

- 杨传堂
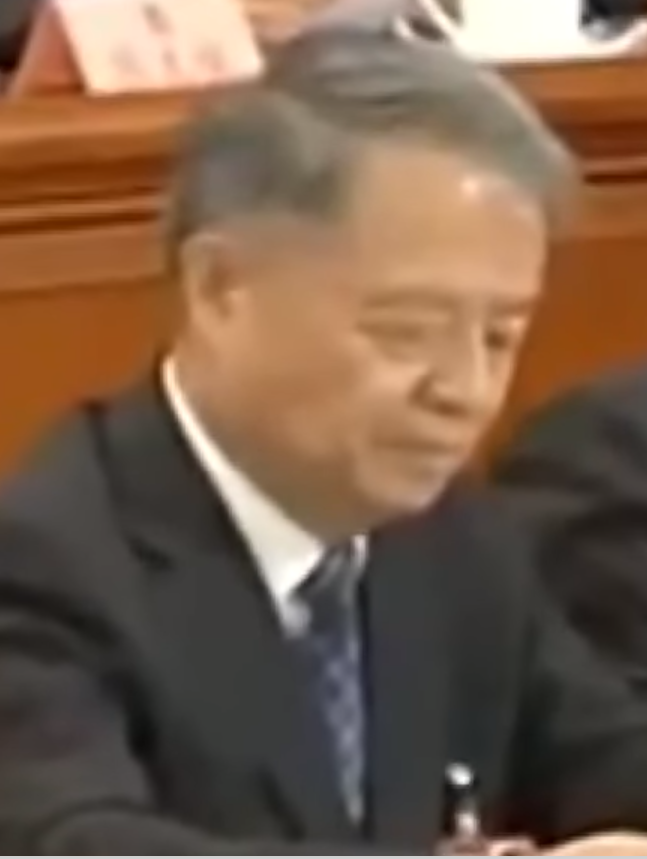
- Yang Chuantang

Vice Chairman of the Chinese People's Political Consultative Conference
- In office 14 March 2018 – 10 March 2023
- Chairman: Wang Yang

Minister of Transport
- In office 31 August 2012 – 3 September 2016
- Premier: Wen Jiabao; Li Keqiang
- Preceded by: Li Shenglin
- Succeeded by: Li Xiaopeng

Party Secretary of Tibet
- In office 16 December 2004 – 29 May 2006; Incapacitated October 2005
- Deputy: Qiangba Puncog (Chairman)
- Preceded by: Guo Jinlong
- Succeeded by: Zhang Qingli

Governor of Qinghai
- In office 20 October 2003 – 23 December 2004
- Party Secretary: Zhao Leji
- Preceded by: Zhao Leji
- Succeeded by: Song Xiuyan

Personal details
- Born: May 1954 (age 72) Yucheng County, Shandong
- Party: Chinese Communist Party
- Education: Shandong Normal University

Yang Chuantang (simplified Chinese: 杨传堂; traditional Chinese: 楊傳堂; pinyin: Yáng Chuántáng; born May 1954) is a Chinese politician who served as the Minister of Transport of the People's Republic of China from 2012 to 2016. He has also served as the vice chairman of the State Ethnic Affairs Commission, governor of Qinghai, party secretary of the Tibet Autonomous Region, and one of the vice chairmen of the 9th Chinese People's Political Consultative Conference.

== Biography ==
=== Shandong ===
Yang was born in Yucheng, Shandong province. He joined the military at age 18. During the Cultural Revolution, he worked on a rural cooperative, then was transferred to work at a petrochemicals factory, where he ascended the ranks to become supervisor and party secretary. He joined the Communist Youth League and then the Chinese Communist Party in 1976 He then took part in the production of ethylene at the Qilu Petrochemicals Company (now a part of China Petrochemical Corporation) in Shandong, his home province. He studied Chinese between 1981 and 1983 at Shandong Normal University. In August 1987, he was named deputy head of the Communist Youth League of Shandong province. In January 1992, he was sent to become head commissioner (mayor equivalent) of Dezhou prefecture.

=== Tibet ===
In November 1993, he was transferred to Tibet to serve as a member of the regional Party Standing Committee and Executive Vice Chairman.

In 1996, he studied Tibetan affairs at the Central Party School and described being "fascinated with" Tibet and its "long hours of sunshine, rich water resources, and diversified geological and climate conditions".

=== Qinghai ===
In October 2003, he succeeded Zhao Leji and moved to the position of deputy secretary of the CCP Qinghai Provincial Committee, deputy governor and acting governor of the Qinghai province. Having worked in the petrochemical industry, he was appointed governor of Qinghai Province from January to December 2004.

=== 2nd in Tibet ===
His promotion to Party Secretary of Tibet in December 2004 was seen as part of a trend in appointing "more highly educated and competent" administrators to lead provincial governments. In November 2005, he was sent to Beijing for treatment of a cerebral hemorrhage. Zhang Qingli was appointed acting secretary of the CCP Tibet Autonomous Region Party Committee, and in May 2006, Zhang was formally appointed secretary of the Tibet Autonomous Regional Committee of the Chinese Communist Party.

=== Beijing ===
Yang was given a Deputy Director position at the National Ethnic Affairs Commission, while maintaining his provincial-ministerial rank in May 2005. In August 2011, he became the Chairperson of the All-China Federation of Supply and Marketing Cooperatives. In August 2012, Yang Chuangtang was appointed to succeed Li Shenglin as Minister of Transport. At the first plenary session of the 12th National People's Congress in March 2013, he was endorsed for the position.

Yang was an alternate of the 16th Central Committee of the Chinese Communist Party, and a full member of the 17th and 18th Central Committees.

On March 14, 2018, Yang Chuantang, was elected vice-chairman of the 13th National Committee of the Chinese People's Political Consultative Conference (CPPCC), becoming a leader of the party and the state. On March 10, 2023, he stepped down from his post as vice-chairman of the CPPCC, and on May 10, 2023, he stepped down from his post as party secretary of the Ministry of Transportation.

Government offices
Preceded by Zhao Leji	Governor of Qinghai; 2003–2004	Succeeded by Song Xiuyan
Preceded by Li Shenglin	Minister of Transport; 2012–2016	Succeeded by Li Xiaopeng
Party political offices
Preceded by Guo Jinlong	Party Secretary of Tibet; 2004–2006	Succeeded by Zhang Qingli
