= Luo Yulin =

Chinese politician (born 1958)

- 骆玉林

President of the Supervisory Board of Key Large State Owned Enterprises
- In office November 2015 – September 2018
- Preceded by: Shi Xiping
- Succeeded by: TBA

Executive Vice Governor of Qinghai
- In office May 2013 – December 2015
- Governor: Hao Peng
- Preceded by: Xu Fushun
- Succeeded by: Zhang Guangrong

Personal details
- Born: August 1958 (age 68) Xinye County, Henan, China
- Party: Chinese Communist Party (1984–2023; expelled)
- Education: Central Party School of the Chinese Communist Party; Hunan University

Chinese name
- Simplified Chinese: 骆玉林
- Traditional Chinese: 駱玉林
Transcriptions
Standard Mandarin
- Hanyu Pinyin: Luò Yùlín

Luo Yulin (Chinese: 骆玉林; born August 1958) is a former Chinese politician who spent most of his career in northwestern China's Qinghai province. As of May 2023 he was under investigation by China's top anti-corruption agency. Previously he served as president of the Supervisory Board of Key Large State Owned Enterprises and before that, executive vice governor of Qinghai.

Luo was a delegate to the 11th National People's Congress.

== Early life and education ==
Luo was born in Xinye County, Henan, in August 1958. He was a sent-down youth in Babao Township of Qilian County between September 1976 and June 1978. Then he worked as a teller at Qilian County Phosphate Fertilizer Plant.

== Career in Qinghai ==
Luo got involved in politics in December 1979, when he became an official in Qilian County Revolutionary Committee. In May 1984, he became deputy director of Qilian County Finance Bureau, rising to director in July 1987. He joined the Chinese Communist Party (CCP) in September 1984.

Luo served as deputy director of the Finance Bureau of Haibei Tibetan Autonomous Prefecture in July 1990, and two years later promoted to the director position.

In August 1994, Luo was transferred to Qinghai Provincial Department of Finance as director of its Industrial and Transportation Enterprise Department, but was reassigned as director of the State owned Assets Management Bureau of Qinghai in June 1996. He was elevated to deputy director of Qinghai Provincial Department of Finance in April 2000. In May 2000, he was appointed director and party secretary of Qinghai Provincial Economic and Trade Commission, in addition to serving as deputy party secretary of the CCP Qinghai Provincial Enterprise Work Committee and deputy director of the State owned Assets Supervision and Administration Commission of Qinghai. He rose to become vice governor of Qinghai in September 2004, concurrently serving as director of the State owned Assets Supervision and Administration Commission of Qinghai and mayor of Xining. He was also director of the Management Committee of Xining (National) Economic and Technological Development Zone, Qaidam Circular Economy Pilot Zone and Haidong Industrial Park. In September 2010, he was admitted to member of the CCP Qinghai Provincial Committee, the province's top authority.

== Career in Beijing ==
In November 2015, Luo was transferred to Beijing and appointed president of the Supervisory Board of Key Large State Owned Enterprises.

== Downfall ==
On 17 May 2023, Luo was suspected of "serious violations of laws and regulations" by the Central Commission for Discipline Inspection (CCDI), the party's internal disciplinary body, and the National Supervisory Commission, the highest anti-corruption agency of China. On November 16, he was expelled from the CCP and disqualified from his retirement benefits. On December 19, he was arrested by the Supreme People's Procuratorate for suspected bribe taking.

On 4 June 2024, Luo was indicted on suspicion of accepting bribes and insider trading. On November 11, he stood trial at the Intermediate People's Court of Qingdao on charges of taking bribes. The public prosecutors accused him of abusing his multiple positions between 1997 and 2023 to seek favor on behalf of certain organizations and individuals in enterprise management, project contracting, and job adjustment, in return, he accepted money and property worth over 220 million yuan ($306 million).

On 14 July 2025, Luo was sentenced to death with a two-year reprieve for bribery, and was deprived of political rights for life and all his properties were also confiscated.

Government offices
Preceded by Zhang Yijiong	Director of Qinghai Provincial Economic and Trade Commission; 2000–2005	Succeeded by Hu Chengli
Preceded by Wang Xiaoqing	Mayor of Xining; 2005–2009	Succeeded by Mao Xiaobing
Preceded by Xu Fushun	Director of the State owned Assets Supervision and Administration Commission of Qinghai; 2008–2015	Succeeded by Wang Liming
Preceded by Xu Fushun	Executive Vice Governor of Qinghai; 2013–2015	Succeeded by Zhang Guangrong
Preceded by Shi Xiping	President of Supervisory Board of Key Large State Owned Enterprises; 2015–2023	Succeeded by TBA
