= Liu Ning =

Chinese politician

- 刘宁
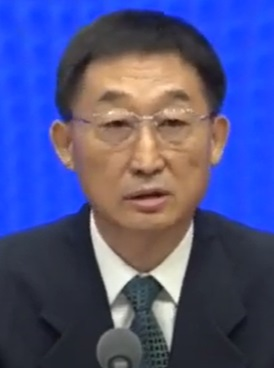

Party Secretary of Henan
- In office 31 December 2024 – 23 September 2026
- Deputy: Wang Kai (governor)
- Preceded by: Lou Yangsheng
- Succeeded by: Zhou Zuyi

Chairperson of Guangxi Autonomous Regional People's Congress
- In office January 2022 – 2025
- Preceded by: Lu Xinshe
- Succeeded by: Chen Gang

Party Secretary of Guangxi
- In office 19 October 2021 – 31 December 2024
- Deputy: Lan Tianli (Chairman)
- Preceded by: Lu Xinshe
- Succeeded by: Chen Gang

Governor of Liaoning
- In office 1 July 2020 – 19 October 2021
- Party Secretary: Chen Qiufa; Zhang Guoqing
- Preceded by: Tang Yijun
- Succeeded by: Li Lecheng

Governor of Qinghai
- In office 7 August 2018 – 22 July 2020
- Party Secretary: Wang Jianjun
- Preceded by: Wang Jianjun
- Succeeded by: Xin Changxing

Personal details
- Born: January 1962 (age 64) Linjiang, Jilin, China
- Party: Chinese Communist Party
- Education: Wuhan University of Hydraulic and Electric Engineering

Chinese name
- Simplified Chinese: 刘宁
- Traditional Chinese: 劉寧
Transcriptions
Standard Mandarin
- Hanyu Pinyin: Liú Níng

Liu Ning (Chinese: 刘宁; born January 1962) is a Chinese politician who served as Party Secretary of Henan from 2024 to 2026. Previously he served as Party Secretary of Guangxi and Governor of Liaoning. He spent much of his career in water resources.

== Career ==
Liu was born in Linjiang, Jilin. He joined the Communist Party in 1990, and he was graduated from Wuhan University of Hydraulic and Electric Engineering (now is a part of Wuhan University).

Liu spent much of his career in water resources. He entered to work in Yangtze River Basin Planning Office, and served as the Chief of the Hub Design Department Crossing Dam Building Design Section Project Team. Later he served as the deputy director, Qingjiang Engineering Design Office, Design Bureau, the deputy director of the Design Center of the Design Institute and Director of the Three Gorges Design Office, the Director of the Jiangyan Engineering Department, Assistant Chief Engineer, deputy director of the Hub Design Department, and the Deputy chief engineer of the Yangtze River Water Resources Commission. In 2000, he served as the General Manager of Hubei Changjiang Bidding Co., Ltd. (湖北长江招投标有限公司).

In 2001, Liu was appointed the Chief Engineer of the Planning and Design Administration of the South–North Water Transfer Project, and he was appointed the General Engineer of the Ministry of Water Resources, later he served as the Deputy Minister in 2009. One of his famous tasks during his tenure was dealing with the situation of the Tangjiashan lake, for which he was awarded the title of "Outstanding Communist Party Member in Earthquake Relief and Disaster Relief (Chinese: 抗震救灾优秀共产党员)".

In 2017, Liu was appointed the CCP Deputy Secretary of Qinghai, then he was appointed the Secretary of the Political and Legal Committee. In August 2018, Liu was appointed the acting Governor of Qinghai. His position was confirmed in September.

In 2020, Liu was appointed Governor of Liaoning.

On 19 October 2021, he was transferred to southwest China's Guangxi Zhuang Autonomous Region and appointed Party Secretary, the top political position in the region.

On 31 December 2024, Liu was appointed Party Secretary of Henan, succeeding Lou Yangsheng. He stepped down from the position on 23 September 2026. On 6 November 2026, he was appointed as the vice chairman of the National People's Congress Agriculture and Rural Affairs Committee at the 25th meeting of the Standing Committee of the 14th National People's Congress.

Government offices
Preceded by Gao Anze	Chief Engineer of the Ministry of Water Resources; 2003–2009	Succeeded by Wang Hong
Preceded by E Jingping	Secretary-General of State Flood Control and Drought Relief Headquarters; 2009–2017	Succeeded by Ye Jianchun
Preceded by Wang Jianjun	Governor of Qinghai; 2018–2020	Succeeded by Xin Changxing
Preceded by Tang Yijun	Governor of Liaoning; 2020–2021	Succeeded by Li Lecheng
Party political offices
Preceded by Wang Jianjun	Deputy Communist Party Secretary of Qinghai; 2017–2018	Succeeded by Wu Xiaojun
Preceded by Wang Xiaoyong	Secretary of the Political and Legal Committee of the Qinghai Provincial Committee of the Chinese Communist Party; 2017–2018	Succeeded by Yin Bai
Preceded by Lu Xinshe	Party Secretary of Guangxi; 2021–2024	Succeeded by Chen Gang
Preceded by Lou Yangsheng	Party Secretary of Henan; 2024–2026	Succeeded by Zhou Zuyi
Assembly seats
Preceded by Lu Xinshe	Chairperson of Guangxi Autonomous Regional People's Congress; 2022–2025	Succeeded by Chen Gang
