= Zhuge Yujie =

Chinese politician

- 诸葛宇杰

Governor of Qinghai
- Incumbent
- Assumed office 30 October 2026
- Party Secretary: Luo Dongchuan
- Preceded by: Luo Dongchuan

Deputy Party Secretary of Hubei
- In office March 2023 – October 2026

Secretary-General of the Shanghai Municipal Committee of the Chinese Communist Party
- In office March 2017 – March 2023

Party Secretary of Yangpu District
- In office January 2015 – April 2017

Governor of Yangpu District
- In office April 2013 – January 2015

Personal details
- Born: May 1971 (age 55) Shanghai, China
- Party: Chinese Communist Party
- Occupation: Politician

Zhuge Yujie (Chinese: 诸葛宇杰; born May 1971), is a Chinese politician, and the current Chinese Communist Party Deputy Committee Secretary and governor of Qinghai. Having spent his entire career in Shanghai, Zhuge has served variously in state-owned enterprises supporting the Port of Shanghai and local leadership roles. Zhuge has been described as a key member of the "7th Generation" of Chinese leadership, and has been speculated to be a potential future successor to Xi Jinping as General Secretary of the Chinese Communist Party, as well as the top leader of China.

== Biography ==
Zhuge Yujie was born in Shanghai. He began work in August 1992, and joined the Chinese Communist Party (CCP) in June 1992. He began work as part of the technical staff of a construction company operating at the Port of Shanghai; he rose through the ranks to take on administrative roles. In July 1999, he was named CCP Committee Secretary and general manager of the Shanghai Port Industry Company (上海港务工程公司). In November 2005, he became chief executive of the Shanghai Yangshan Tongsheng Port Construction Company. In February 2009, he was named deputy governor of Putuo District, Shanghai. In February 2011, he became the president and deputy party secretary of the Shanghai International Port Holdings Co. In April 2013, Zhuge was named Governor of Yangpu District. In January 2015, he assumed the post of the party secretary of Yangpu District.

In July 2016, he was named chief of the general office of the Shanghai Municipal Committee of the CCP, and deputy secretary-general. In March 2017, he was named a member of the Shanghai municipal party standing committee after being promoted to secretary-general, taking on the post vacated by Yin Hong. At the time of his appointment, he was the youngest person with a seat on a provincial level standing committee.

In March 2023, Zhuge was transferred to Hubei to serve as a CCP Deputy Committee Secretary of Hubei.

In October 2026, Zhuge was transferred to Qinghai to serve as a CCP Deputy Committee Secretary of Qinghai and the party secretary of the Qinghai Provincial People's Government. On 30 October 2026, Zhuge was appointed as the acting governor of Qinghai.
