= Zhao Leji =

Chinese politician (born 1957)

- 赵乐际
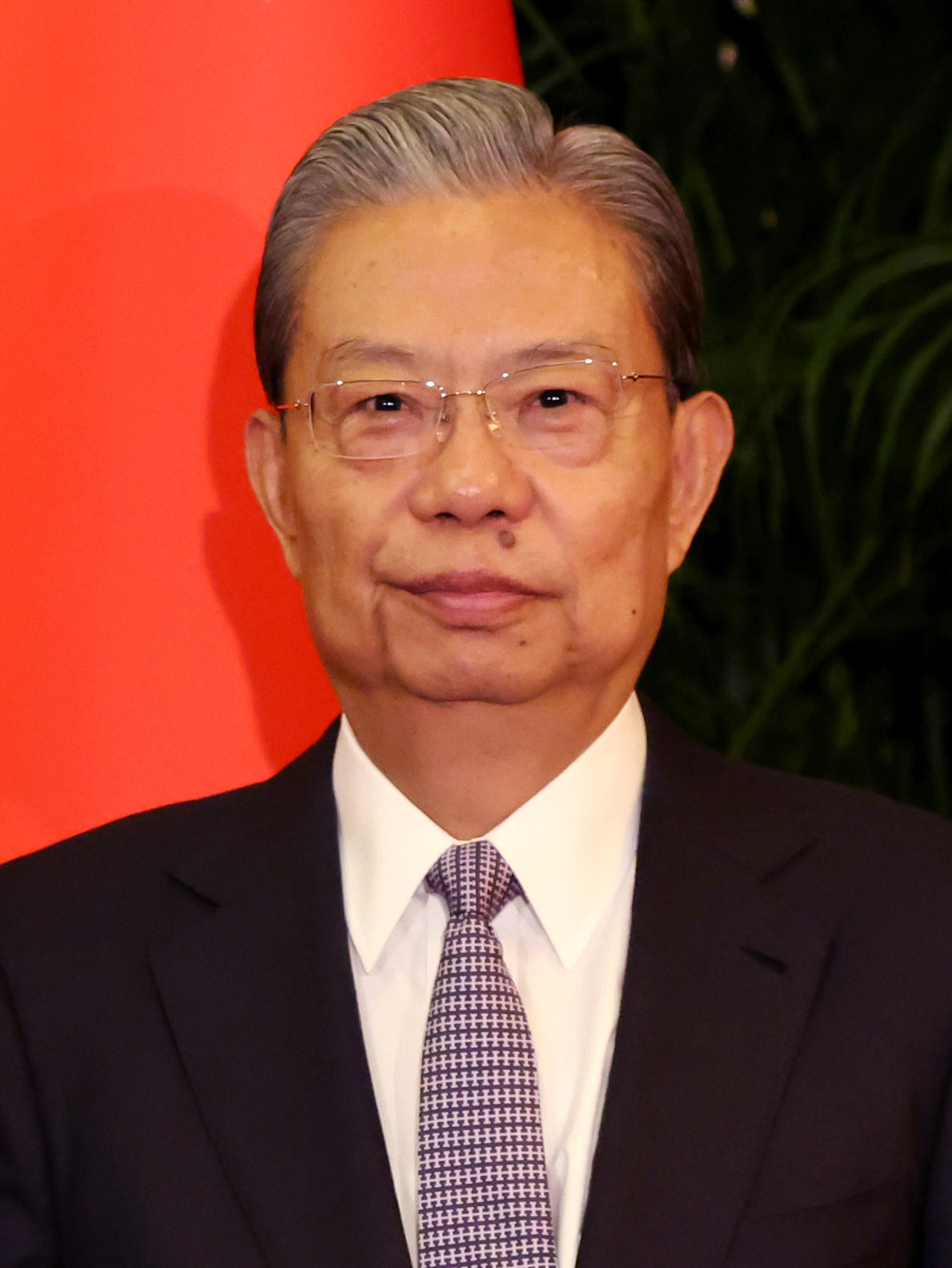
- Zhao in 2026

11th Chairman of the Standing Committee of the National People's Congress
- Incumbent
- Assumed office 10 March 2023
- Vice Chairpersons: See list: Li Hongzhong; Wang Dongming; Xiao Jie; Zheng Jianbang; Ding Zhongli; Hao Mingjin; Cai Dafeng; He Wei; Wu Weihua; Tie Ning; Peng Qinghua; Zhang Qingwei; Losang Jamcan; Shohrat Zakir
- Secretary-General: Liu Qi
- Preceded by: Li Zhanshu

Secretary of the Central Commission for Discipline Inspection
- In office 25 October 2017 – 23 October 2022
- Deputy: Yang Xiaodu
- General Secretary: Xi Jinping
- Preceded by: Wang Qishan
- Succeeded by: Li Xi

Head of the Organization Department of the Chinese Communist Party
- In office 19 November 2012 – 28 October 2017
- Deputy: Chen Xi
- General Secretary: Xi Jinping
- Preceded by: Li Yuanchao
- Succeeded by: Chen Xi

Party Secretary of Shaanxi
- In office 25 March 2007 – 19 November 2012
- Preceded by: Li Jianguo
- Succeeded by: Zhao Zhengyong

Party Secretary of Qinghai
- In office 19 August 2003 – 26 March 2007
- Preceded by: Su Rong
- Succeeded by: Qiang Wei

Governor of Qinghai
- In office 16 August 1999 – 20 October 2003
- Preceded by: Bai Enpei
- Succeeded by: Yang Chuantang

Personal details
- Born: 8 March 1957 (age 69) Xining, Qinghai, China
- Party: CCP (1976–present)
- Children: 2
- Education: Peking University (BA)

Chinese name
- Simplified Chinese: 赵乐际
- Traditional Chinese: 趙樂際
Transcriptions
Standard Mandarin
- Hanyu Pinyin: Zhào Lèjì
- Wade–Giles: Chao Lê-chi
- IPA: [ʈʂâʊ lɤ̂.tɕî]

Zhao Leji (Note: Chinese: 赵乐际; pinyin: Zhào Lèjì) (born 8 March 1957) is a Chinese politician who is the current chairman of the Standing Committee of the National People's Congress and the third-ranking member of the Politburo Standing Committee of the Chinese Communist Party (CCP), behind Xi Jinping, the CCP general secretary, and Li Qiang, the premier.

In his earlier political career, he served as the party secretary of Qinghai, the party secretary of Shaanxi, and the head of the Organization Department of the CCP. He entered the CCP Politburo in 2012 and was promoted to the Politburo Standing Committee five years later. Between 2017 and 2022, he was the secretary of the Central Commission for Discipline Inspection, the party's top anti-corruption body.

== Early life ==
Zhao Leji was born in Xining, Qinghai province, on 8 March 1957. His parents were from Xi'an, Shaanxi province. The family moved to Qinghai as part of the aid programs in frontier regions under the leadership of Mao Zedong. In 1974, during the later years of the Cultural Revolution, Zhao worked at an agricultural commune in Guide County as a sent-down youth. After working there for about a year, Zhao returned to the city to become a communications assistant at the Commerce Department of the Qinghai provincial government.

Zhao joined the Chinese Communist Party (CCP) in 1975 and entered Peking University in 1977 as a Worker-Peasant-Soldier student; he received an undergraduate degree of philosophy there in January 1980. He then spent three years teaching at the Qinghai School of Commerce, holding various positions such as instructor, secretary of the Communist Youth League (CYL) wing of the provincial department of commerce, as well as the deputy head of the dean's office. In 1983, he returned to the Qinghai Commerce Department as the deputy party secretary of the Political Department, as well as the secretary of the Department's CYL Committee, working there until 1984.

Between 1984 and 1986, he worked as the general manager and party secretary of the Electronic and Chemical Corporation of Qinghai. In April 1986, he became deputy head and deputy party secretary of the provincial Commerce Department, being promoted to its head and party secretary in 1991, working there until 1994.

== Local careers ==
=== Qinghai ===
In 1993, Zhao was appointed an assistant governor of Qinghai, entering the provincial government and becoming part of the inner circle of then Qinghai party secretary Yin Kesheng. He was elevated to vice governor of Qinghai in 1994, and appointed as party secretary of his hometown Xining in 1997. He acceded to the post of governor in 1999 at age 42, becoming the youngest provincial governor in the country at the time. He became a member of the CCP Central Committee after the 16th CCP National Congress in 2002.

Zhao's upward trajectory began to slow by the turn of the century. Zhao became party secretary of Qinghai in 2003 after having spent nearly five years in the Governor's office. Part of his inability to move to a more economically prosperous and more politically visible province was attributed to his Shaanxi background. He spoke in Shaanxi dialect even at government meetings.

Zhao's tenure in Qinghai was marked by rapid economic growth, during which the province's GDP tripled. It was said that Zhao took a relatively soft approach on ethnic minority issues and took on environmentally conscious investment projects. His achievements in Qinghai were lauded by the party's central leadership.

=== Shaanxi ===
In 2007, Zhao was transferred to become party secretary in his parents' home province of Shaanxi, breaking an unspoken rule in the Communist Party that party secretaries should never hail from the province they are native to. This was seen as an indication of the trust shown to Zhao by the central leadership. In 2008, Shaanxi's GDP growth figures hit 15%, becoming one of only two provincial-level divisions to set sights on GDP growth rates of over 13%. In Shaanxi, Zhao oversaw the expansion and development of the GuanZhong-TianShui (关中-天水) economic belt.

== Central leadership ==
=== Organization Department ===
After the 18th CCP National Congress in November 2012, he was appointed a member of the Politburo and head of the Organization Department of the CCP. As the head of the Organization Department, Zhao was a critical figure in executing CCP general secretary Xi Jinping's anti-corruption campaign. Zhao worked closely with Wang Qishan, the Secretary of the Central Commission for Discipline Inspection, the party's highest internal-control institution; in 2014, the People's Daily said that "whenever Qishan makes a move, Zhao Leji gets busy". During his tenure, Zhao also promoted poverty alleviation and strengthening party control in trading estates, office buildings and internet companies.

=== Central Commission for Discipline Inspection ===
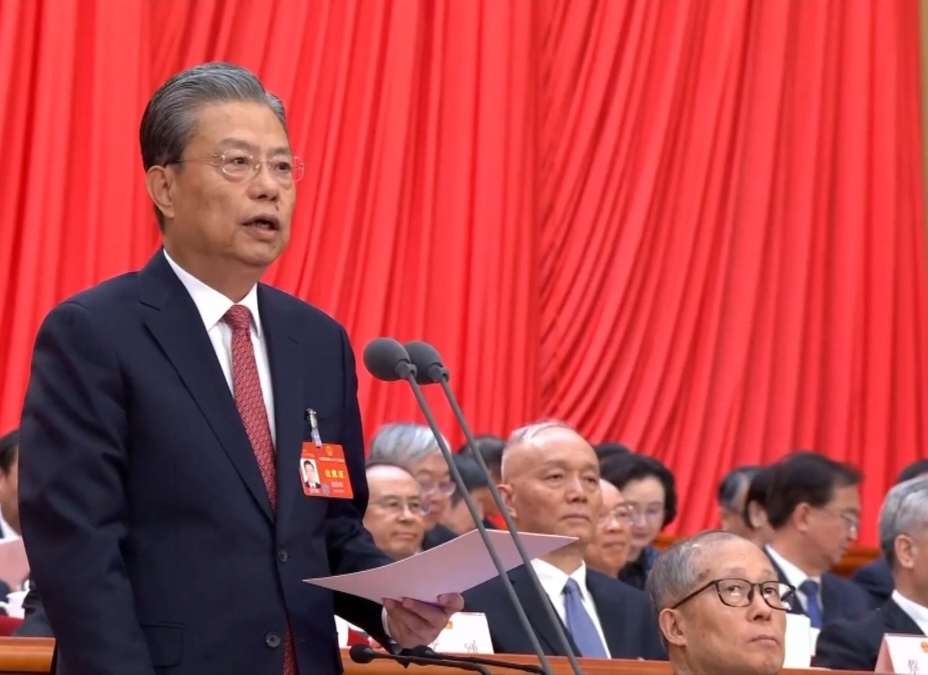
At the closing meeting of the second session of the 14th National People's Congress in March 2024

Zhao was chosen to be the 6th-ranking member of the Politburo Standing Committee, China's top decision-making body, at the 1st plenary session of the 19th Central Committee of the CCP on 25 October 2017. In the same session, he succeeded Wang Qishan to become the Secretary of the Central Commission for Discipline Inspection. On 11 November 2017, he wrote an article in the People's Daily, warning that "if our control of the party is not strong and party governance is not strict, then the party won’t be able to avoid being erased by history and the historic task the party carries will not be able to be fulfilled".

Zhao took a more low-profile approach as CCDI secretary compared to his predecessor Wang Qishan. According to The Wall Street Journal, Zhao was "taking a largely hands-off approach during his time in office and barely involved in making decisions on investigations". Officials that were investigated under Zhao include former justice minister Fu Zhenghua, as well as Xiao Yaqing, Sheng Guangzu, and Sun Lijun. In March 2018, Zhao told the Hong Kong and Macau delegates to the Chinese People's Political Consultative Conference that high autonomy should not be used to erode central government control. At a conference in September 2021, Zhao announced a nationwide audit of major financial firms and regulators.

=== National People's Congress Standing Committee ===
Following the first plenary session of the 20th CCP Central Committee, Zhao was reappointed to the Politburo Standing Committee, becoming its 3rd-ranked member, and was succeeded by Li Xi as the CCDI secretary. On 10 March 2023, he was appointed the chairman of the Standing Committee of the National People's Congress, succeeding Li Zhanshu.

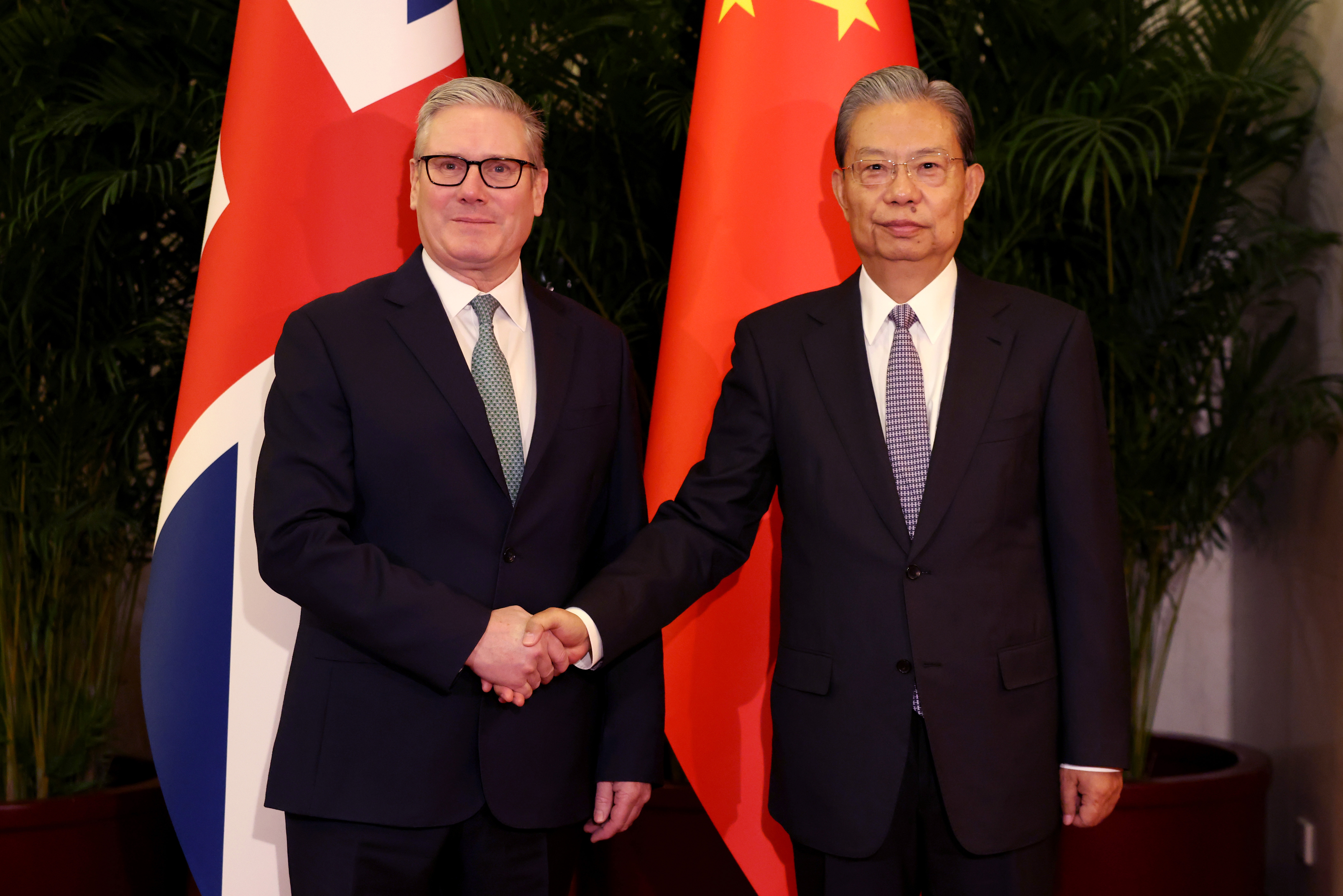
Zhao with British Prime Minister Keir Starmer in Beijing, 29 January 2026

In May 2023, Zhao visited Senegal and Morocco. In March 2024, during a meeting of the NPC Standing Committee, Zhao Leji pledged to revise the National Defense Education Law with a focus on "modernizing China's system and capacity for national security". He also signaled changes in the Cybersecurity Law. The same month, he attended the Boao Forum for Asia, where he called on Asian countries to "jointly maintain security in Asia". He also called for implementing the Global Security Initiative. In April 2024, Zhao visited North Korea, making him the highest-level Chinese official to visit North Korea since CCP general secretary Xi Jinping visited North Korea in 2019. During the visit, Zhao met with his North Korean counterpart Choe Ryong-hae, the chairman of North Korea's legislative body, and North Korean leader Kim Jong Un.

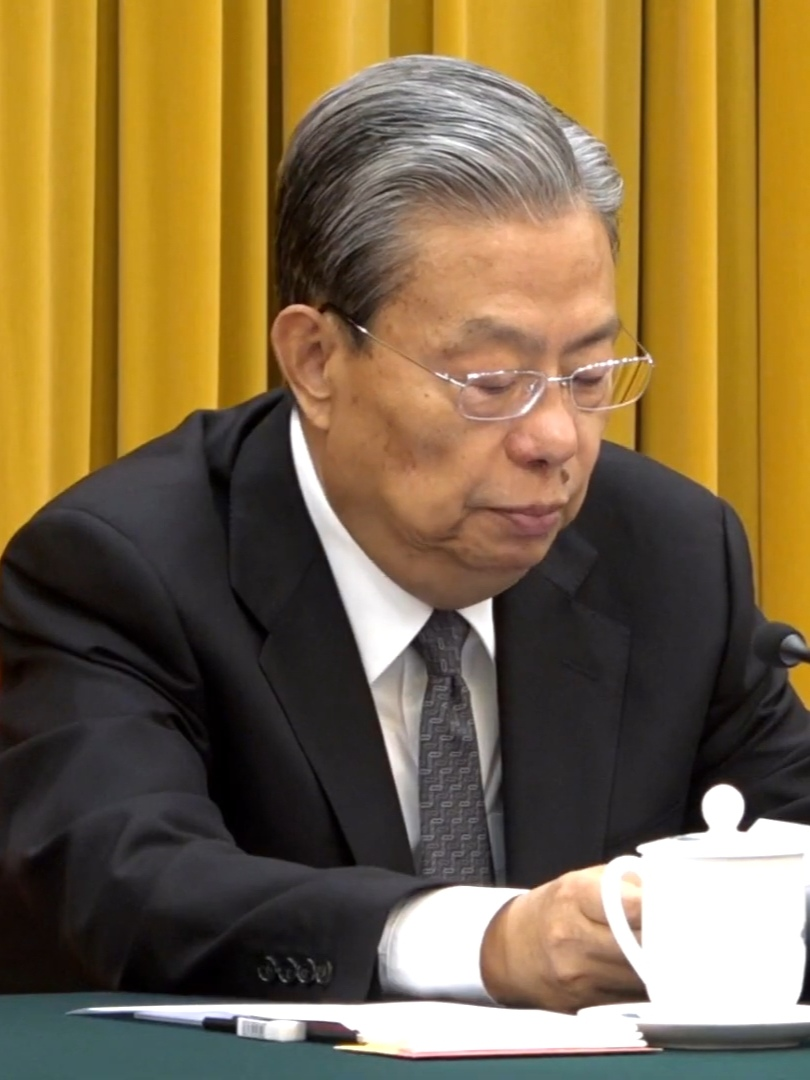
Zhao on March 14, 2025. Previously on 11 March, he missed the closing meeting of the third session of the 14th National People's Congress due to a respiratory tract infection.

Zhao missed the closing meeting of the third session of the 14th National People's Congress on 11 March 2025 due to a respiratory tract infection, which the South China Morning Post described as "the first time in decades that the NPC closing meeting was not attended by all members of the Politburo Standing Committee". Vice Chairman Li Hongzhong was entrusted on Zhao's behalf to preside over the closing ceremony. He reappeared on 12 March while attending a meeting with state media employees to thank them for their coverage of the session. In November 2025, Zhao visited New Zealand, where he met with New Zealand Prime Minister Christopher Luxon. He also visited Australia, where he met with Australian Prime Minister Anthony Albanese. In March 2026, he gave a speech at the Boao Forum for Asia, where he said "the people of Asia, having endured the scourge of war and chaos, deeply understand the value of peace and stability" and urged countries to "respect the sovereignty and territorial integrity of all countries, adhere to non-interference in the internal affairs of other countries, [and] resolve conflicts and differences through peaceful means".

== Notes ==
Assembly seats
Preceded by Li Zhanshu	Chairman of the Standing Committee of the National People's Congress; 2023–present	Incumbent
Government offices
Preceded by Bai Enpei	Governor of Qinghai; 1999–2003	Succeeded by Yang Chuantang
Party political offices
Preceded by Li Yuanchao	Head of the Organization Department of the Chinese Communist Party; 2012–2017	Succeeded by Chen Xi
Preceded by Li Jianguo	Party Secretary of Shaanxi; 2007–2012	Succeeded by Zhao Zhengyong
Preceded by Su Rong	Party Secretary of Qinghai; 2003–2007	Succeeded by Qiang Wei
Preceded by Lv Xingguo	Party Secretary of Xining; 1997–1999	Succeeded by Li Jincheng
Order of precedence
Preceded by Li Qiang as Premier of China	Order of precedence of China as Chairman of the Standing Committee of the National People's Congress	Succeeded by Wang Huning as Chairman of the National Committee of the Chinese People's Political Consultative Conference
