= Xin Changxing =

Chinese politician (born 1963)

- 信长星
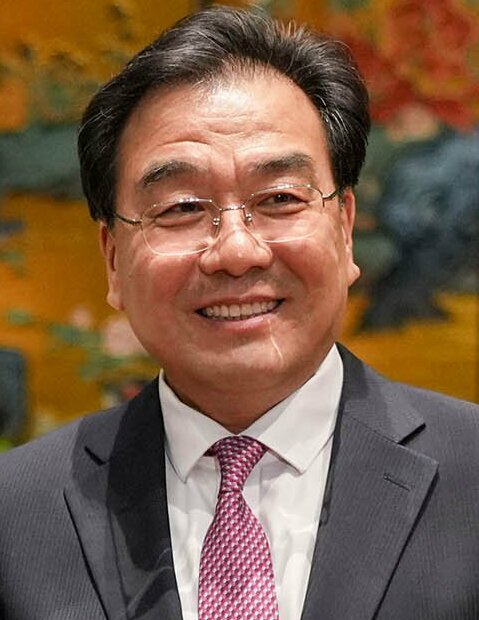
- Xin Changxing in 2023

Party Secretary of Jiangsu
- Incumbent
- Assumed office 3 January 2023
- Deputy: Xu Kunlin → Liu Xiaotao (Governor)
- Preceded by: Wu Zhenglong

Party Secretary of Qinghai
- In office 28 March 2022 – 3 January 2023
- Deputy: Wu Xiaojun (Governor)
- Preceded by: Wang Jianjun
- Succeeded by: Chen Gang

Governor of Qinghai
- In office 1 August 2020 – 31 March 2022
- Party Secretary: Wang Jianjun
- Preceded by: Liu Ning
- Succeeded by: Wu Xiaojun

Personal details
- Born: December 1963 (age 62) Huimin County, Shandong, China
- Party: Chinese Communist Party
- Education: Qufu Normal University
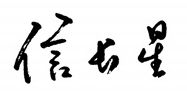
- Signature

Chinese name
- Simplified Chinese: 信长星
- Traditional Chinese: 信長星
Transcriptions
Standard Mandarin
- Hanyu Pinyin: Xìn Chángxīng

Xin Changxing (Chinese: 信长星; born December 1963) is a Chinese politician and the current Party Secretary of Jiangsu. Previously, he served as Party Secretary of Qinghai, Governor of Qinghai, and Deputy Communist Party Secretary of Anhui. Xin is a lifelong civil servant.

== Biography ==
Xin graduated from Qufu Normal University in 1983 with a BA in political science. In 1986, he earned a MA in economics from the Huazhong Normal University. After graduating, he was assigned to the Ministry of Labour to work at an institute under its jurisdiction. Thereafter he conducted research on ccompensation structures He then worked in human resources and labour policy at the Taiyuan Iron and Steel Group. He was sent back to the Ministry of Labour to take on administrative roles and later took on a brief stint as the vice-mayor of Xi'an, capital of Shaanxi Province capital of Shaanxi Province.

In July 2008, he was named deputy director of the State Administration of Civil Service; in September 2010, he was named vice-minister of Human Resources and Social Security. In August 2014, he was named director of the State Administration of Civil Service.

In October 2016, Xin was appointed deputy party secretary of Anhui Province.

In 2020, Xin was appointed deputy party secretary and later governor of Qinghai. In March 2022, he was named Party Secretary of Qinghai, succeeding Wang Jianjun.

Xin is an alternate of the 19th Central Committee of the Chinese Communist Party, and a full member of the 20th.

Party political offices
Preceded by Wu Zhenglong	Party Secretary of Jiangsu; 2023–present	Incumbent
Preceded by Wang Jianjun	Party Secretary of Qinghai; 2022–2023	Succeeded by Chen Gang
Preceded by Li Guoying	Specifically-designated Deputy Party Secretary of Anhui; 2016–2020	Succeeded by Cheng Lihua
Government offices
Preceded by Liu Ning	Governor of Qinghai; 2020–2022	Succeeded by Wu Xiaojun
Preceded by Yin Weimin	Director of State Administration of Civil Service; 2014–2016	Succeeded by Fu Xingguo
