= Shangqiu Normal University =

University in Henan Province, China

- Motto: 应天归德 智圆行方
- Type: Public
- Active: 1945–1976-1978
- President: Jie Xiaolei (介晓磊)
- Academic staff: 1,700
- Students: 3,2433
- Location: Shangqiu, China
- Campus: Pingyuan Rd Campus Wenhua Rd Campus (1,220,000 m^{2} (13,100,000 sq ft) total)
- Nickname: 商丘师范学院/商丘师院
- Website: www.sqnu.edu.cn

Shangqiu Normal University (SQNU) (Chinese: 商丘师范学院), formerly known as Shangqiu Teachers' College, is a public university in the city of Shangqiu, in Henan Province, China. As a key university in Henan Province, it is a comprehensive local university with salient features of teacher training and a particular strength in liberal arts. The main undertakings are undergraduate education with the chief aim of producing high-level application-oriented talents.

The institution has a student population of about 17,000.

== Campuses ==
SQNU is divided into two campuses: the Old Campus, and the New Campus.

The Old Campus is about 100 years old and houses the technical and science related majors: mathematics, computer science, etc. The New Campus, which is finishing construction, lies less than 1 km away; it houses the university's liberal arts: English, History, Music, etc.

Over the next few years, SQNU plans to acquire land from a military training center on its western boundary, further increasing its size and eventually classifying it as a full-fledged University.

== System ==
SQNU is a state-run full-time university, offering bachelor's programmes (four years). The students are conferred with graduate diploma of Shangqiu Normal University and bachelor's degree after they have completed the four-year curriculum and passed the necessary courses.

== Majors ==
There is a wide range of over 50 majors.
