= Qinghai Provincial Committee of the Chinese Communist Party =

Qinghai Provincial Committee of the Chinese Communist Party 中国共产党青海省委员会

Overview
- Type: Highest decision-making organ when Qinghai Provincial Congress is not in session.
- Elected by: Qinghai Provincial Congress
- Length of term: Five years
- Term limits: None
- First convocation: September 25, 1949; 77 years ago
- Secretary: Luo Dongchuan
- Deputy Secretary: Zhuge Yujie
- Secretary-General: Zhu Xiangfeng
- Executive organ: Standing Committee
- Inspection organ: Commission for Discipline Inspection

Qinghai Provincial Committee of the Chinese Communist Party
- Simplified Chinese: 中国共产党青海省委员会
- Traditional Chinese: 中國共產黨青海省委員會
Transcriptions
Standard Mandarin
- Hanyu Pinyin: Zhōngguó Gòngchǎndǎng Qīnghǎishěng Wěiyuánhuì

Abbreviation
- Simplified Chinese: 中共青海省委
- Traditional Chinese: 中共青海省委
- Literal meaning: CCP Qinghai Provincial Committee
Transcriptions
Standard Mandarin
- Hanyu Pinyin: Zhōnggòng Qīnghǎishěng Wěi

The Qinghai Provincial Committee of the Chinese Communist Party is the provincial committee of the Chinese Communist Party (CCP) in Qinghai, China, and the province's top authority. The CCP committee secretary is the highest ranking post in the province.

== Organizations ==
The organization of the Qinghai Provincial Committee includes:

- General Office

=== Functional Departments ===
- Organization Department
- Publicity Department
- United Front Work Department
- Political and Legal Affairs Commission
- Social Work Department
- Commission for Discipline Inspection
- Supervisory Commission

=== Offices ===
- Policy Research Office
- Office of the Cyberspace Affairs Commission
- Office of the Foreign Affairs Commission
- Office of the Deepening Reform Commission
- Office of the Institutional Organization Commission
- Office of the Military-civilian Fusion Development Committee
- Taiwan Work Office
- Office of the Leading Group for Inspection Work
- Bureau of Veteran Cadres

=== Dispatched institutions ===
- Working Committee of the Organs Directly Affiliated to the Qinghai Provincial Committee

=== Organizations directly under the Committee ===
- Qinghai Party School
- Qinghai Daily Newspaper Group
- Qinghai Institute of Socialism
- Party History Research Office
- Qinghai Provincial Archives
- Lecturer Group

=== Organization managed by the work organization ===
- Confidential Bureau

== Leadership ==
=== Heads of the Organization Department ===
Name (English)	Name (Chinese)	Tenure begins	Tenure ends	Note
Zhao Yuexia	赵月霞	April 2022		

=== Heads of the Publicity Department ===
Name (English)	Name (Chinese)	Tenure begins	Tenure ends	Note
Wang Danan	王大南	April 2022		

=== Secretaries of the Political and Legal Affairs Commission ===
Name (English)	Name (Chinese)	Tenure begins	Tenure ends	Note
He Luchun	何录春	December 2024		

=== Heads of the United Front Work Department ===
Name (English)	Name (Chinese)	Tenure begins	Tenure ends	Note
Banguo	班果	May 2022		

== See also ==
- Politics of Qinghai
