= Bai Enpei =

Chinese official

- 白恩培

Party Secretary of Yunnan
- In office October 2001 – August 2011
- Governor: Xu Rongkai; Qin Guangrong
- Preceded by: Linghu An
- Succeeded by: Qin Guangrong

Party Secretary of Qinghai
- In office June 1999 – October 2001
- Governor: Zhao Leji
- Preceded by: Tian Chengping
- Succeeded by: Su Rong

Governor of Qinghai
- In office April 1997 – August 1999
- Preceded by: Tian Chengping
- Succeeded by: Zhao Leji

Personal details
- Born: 8 September 1946 (age 79) Qingjian County, Shaanxi, China
- Party: Chinese Communist Party (1973–2015; expelled)
- Spouse: Zhang Huiqing
- Education: Northwestern Polytechnical University

Bai Enpei (Chinese: 白恩培; pinyin: Bái Ēnpéi; born 8 September 1946) is a former Chinese politician convicted of corruption. Bai served as the Chinese Communist Party Deputy Committee Secretary of Inner Mongolia between 1993 and 1997, Governor and later Party Secretary of Qinghai between 1997 and 2001, was the Party Secretary of Yunnan, the highest political position in the province, between 2001 and 2011.

Bai was investigated by the party's anti-corruption watchdog in 2014, and eventually convicted on charges of bribery and amassing wealth of unclear origin, and sentenced to death with reprieve in 2016. Bai held the record for the highest recorded sum of corrupt earnings, and the most severe sentence among all officials charged with corruption during the anti-corruption campaign under Xi Jinping.

== Biography ==
Bai was born in 1946 in Yuanjiagou village, Qingjian County, Shaanxi Province. After completing elementary school, he left his hometown as a teenager. In 1965, Bai was admitted into the Northwestern Polytechnical University, studying mechanical automation. During the Cultural Revolution, he was placed in a collective farm to perform manual labour. In 1972, he was transferred out to work at the diesel engine factory in Yan'an, starting out as a dispatcher. Bai would stay at the factory for some 11 years, going from a technician to a vice president, then president and party chief of the factory. In 1983, he was transferred to become the head of the Yan'an Cigarette Factory.

In early 1980, as part of the drive to promote youthful officials across the country, Bai, with his academic and industrial leadership background, was identified as a promising future leader by the party organization. In September 1983, Bai became the deputy party secretary of Yan'an; two years later he became party chief. In 1987, at the 13th National Congress of the Chinese Communist Party, Bai became an alternate member of the Central Committee.

In May 1990, Bai left his home province, working successively in Inner Mongolia, Qinghai, and Yunnan provinces. He served as the party organization head in Inner Mongolia, the deputy party chief, then deputy party chief, Governor, and Party Secretary of Qinghai province. In October 2001, he became Communist Party Secretary of Yunnan province. In August 2011, having reached the retirement age for ministerial officials of 65, he was replaced by Qin Guangrong. Following his term as provincial party secretary, Bai served on the Environment and Resource Protection Committee of the National People's Congress.

== Corruption ==
In August 2014, state media announced that Bai would undergo investigation for "serious violations of law and discipline." On September 3, 2014, Bai was dismissed from his posts by the Chinese government. Soon following his investigation, it was revealed that Bai had business dealings with Sichuan businessman Liu Han (who was sentenced to death in a separate case), Liu Wei (also executed), and Jiang Jiemin, former head of the China National Petroleum who was also a Central Committee member. Bai also reportedly took kickbacks during the privatization of state-owned local mining companies. His successor, Qin Guangrong, turned himself in to the authorities in May 2019.

On October 9, 2016, Bai was sentenced by the Anyang Intermediate People's Court to death sentence with reprieve without commutation or parole when the sentence was automatically reduced to life imprisonment; he was convicted of taking bribes worth some 246.7 million yuan (~$41.12 million) and amassing wealth of unclear origin, boasting the largest recorded sum of any official charged with corruption during the term of Xi Jinping. Bai's sentence was the toughest yet doled out in the anti-corruption campaign under Xi Jinping.

== Family ==
Bai comes from a prominent political family. Bai's grandfather was a cousin of Bai Rubing, former party chief and two-time governor of Shandong, and Bai Dongcai, former party chief of Jiangxi. Bai's uncle, Bai Zhimin, was also a prominent official. Bai was married twice. His second wife, Zhang Huiqing (张慧清), was vice-president and party chief of the Yunnan provincial branch of State Grid. The two had met in Qinghai when Zhang was an ordinary functionary (or according to some reports, a waitress); when she came to Yunnan with Bai, she was rapidly promoted to a position with a high six-figure salary. It was reported from numerous sources that Bai was "afraid of his wife".

Government offices
Preceded by Tian Chengping	Governor of Qinghai; 1997–1999	Succeeded by Zhao Leji
Party political offices
Preceded by Tian Chengping	Party Secretary of Qinghai; 1999–2001	Succeeded by Su Rong
Preceded by Linghu An	Party Secretary of Yunnan; 2001–2011	Succeeded by Qin Guangrong
