= Western Mining Co., Ltd. =

Chinese metal and mining company

Western Mining Co., Ltd. 西部矿业股份有限公司
- Type: Public company
- Traded as: SSE: 601168
- Industry: Metal mining, smelting, trading
- Founded: 28 December 2000; 25 years ago
- Founder: Western Mining Group
- Headquarters: Xining, Qinghai Province, China
- Area served: China and international
- Key people: Zhang Yongli (Chairman and President); Hua Jincang (Director and Executive President)
- Products: Copper, lead, zinc, iron, gold, silver
- Revenue: RMB 31.2 billion (2023)
- Net income: RMB 1.05 billion (2023)
- Total assets: RMB 38.5 billion (2023)
- Owner: Western Mining Group (28.21%)
- Parent: Western Mining Group
- Website: www.westmining.com

Western Mining Co., Ltd. (Chinese: 西部矿业股份有限公司; pinyin: Xībù Kuàngyè Gǔfèn Yǒuxiàn Gōngsī) is a major Chinese metal mining and smelting company headquartered in Xining, Qinghai Province. It engages in the exploration, mining, processing, and sale of non-ferrous and precious metals, including copper, lead, zinc, iron, gold, and silver. It is one of the largest producers of lead and zinc concentrates in China.

== Corporate affairs ==
Western Mining Group, a state-owned enterprise, holds a 28.21% controlling stake in the listed company. Western Mining Group itself is majority-owned (50.37%) by the Qinghai Provincial State-owned Assets Supervision and Administration Commission. The listed entity functions as the flagship vehicle for the group's public-facing business.

The company was previously a constituent of the SSE 50 Index but was removed in 2012.

== History ==
Western Mining Co., Ltd. was established in 2000 and is a subsidiary of Western Mining Group, which is controlled by the Qinghai Provincial People's Government. It was listed on the Shanghai Stock Exchange on 12 July 2007 under stock code SSE: 601168.

In 2008, the company began trial operations at its Yulong Copper Mine in Tibet Autonomous Region, a major copper resource in the region. The company acquired a 17% stake in the project from Zijin Mining in 2007.

== Operations ==
Western Mining Co., Ltd. is a major Chinese mining company headquartered in Xining, Qinghai Province. It operates a diversified portfolio of mining and smelting subsidiaries across several provinces, including Qinghai, Tibet, Xinjiang, and Gansu, focusing on the extraction and processing of base metals such as copper, lead, zinc, and magnesium.

=== Major mines and projects ===
- Yulong Copper Mine (Tibet): Recognized as one of China's largest porphyry copper deposits, the Yulong Copper Mine underwent a significant expansion project completed in 2023. This upgrade increased its annual copper production capacity to 130,000 tonnes.
- Xitieshan Lead-Zinc Mine (Qinghai): As one of China's largest lead-zinc mines, Xitieshan produced approximately 55,210 tonnes of zinc in 2023. The mine is slated to operate until at least 2030.
