= Zhang Zhongliang =

Chinese politician

Zhang Zhongliang (Chinese: 张仲良; 1907–1983) was a member of the Chinese Communist Party (CCP). He was born in Yao County, Shaanxi Province where he joined the Communist Party in February 1931. He was the secretary of the CCP Qinghai committee, and later became the first secretary of the CCP Gansu committee, chairman of the Gansu CPPCC and political commissar of the Gansu military region. He was removed from these posts in 1962. Zhang died in February 1983.

Preceded by new office	Party Secretary of Qinghai; 1950–1952	Succeeded by Zhao Shoushan
Preceded by Zhao Shoushan	Governor of Qinghai; 1952	Succeeded by Gao Feng
Preceded by Zhang Desheng	Party Secretary of Gansu; 1954–1961	Succeeded by Wang Feng
