= Song Xiuyan =

Chinese politician

Song Xiuyan (Chinese: 宋秀岩; pinyin: Sòng Xiùyán, born October 1955 in Tianjin) is a politician in the People's Republic of China and was the 17th Governor of Qinghai province in the China. Song was China's second female governor. She is currently the Vice President of the All-China Women's Federation.

== Biography ==
She graduated from the Central Party School of the Chinese Communist Party. Song's career was dominated by time in the Communist Youth League. After a long career in the provincial government of Qinghai in Northwest China, she was elected as Governor of the province on January 23, 2005. Following Gu Xiulian, who served as Governor of Jiangsu from 1983 to 1985.

Song was an alternate of 15th and 16th Central Committee of the Chinese Communist Party and a member of 17th and 18th Central Committees. She is married and has a son.

Political offices
Preceded by Yang Chuantang	Governor of Qinghai; 2004–2010	Succeeded by Luo Huining
