= Zhao Haifeng =

Chinese politician

Party Secretary of Qinghai
- In office April 1983 – July 1985

Vice Governor of Qinghai
- In office October 1981 – October 1981

First Political Commisar of the Qinghai Military District
- In office February 1980 – January 1984

Vice-Chairman of the Qinghai Revolutionary Committee
- In office 1977–1978

Zhao Haifeng (Chinese: 赵海峰; 1919 – August 21, 2006) was a politician of the People's Republic of China. Zhao was born in Raoyang, Hebei Province, and joined the Chinese Communist Party (CCP) in August 1938. Since July 1977, he served as a standing committee member of the CCP Qinghai committee, vice secretary of that committee, vice director of the Qinghai revolutionary commission, secretary of the CCP Qinghai committee, chairman of the Qinghai Chinese People's Political Consultative Conference and first political commissar of the Qinghai Military Region.
