= Wang Zhao (politician) =

Chinese politician

Wang Zhao (Chinese: 王昭; 1917–1970) was a Chinese political figure active during the early People's Republic. An active member of the Chinese Communist Party and a general in the People's Liberation Army, he served as governor of Qinghai in the 1960s.

== Early life ==
Wang was born in Tianjing Village, Pingshan County, Hebei Province. He joined the Chinese Communist Party (CCP) in 1932.

== Career ==
He became the Chinese Communist Party Committee Secretary of Shijiazhuang and mayor of that city in August 1945. He attended the first Chinese People's Political Consultative Conference (CPPCC) meeting in September 1949, as a delegate from the Chinese People's Liberation Army, and attended the founding ceremony of the People's Republic of China on October 1. He joined the People's Volunteer Army in October 1950, and fought in the Korean War. He was awarded the first-class national flag medal and second-class independence freedom medal in North Korea.

In April 1961, Wang was appointed the second secretary of the CCP Qinghai committee, and became acting first secretary four months later. From August 1962, he served as acting governor and went on to become governor of Qinghai.

== Death and legacy ==
Wang was framed and tortured during the Cultural Revolution and died in prison. He was politically rehabilitated by Deng Xiaoping in 1977.
