= Luo Huining =

Chinese politician

- 骆惠宁
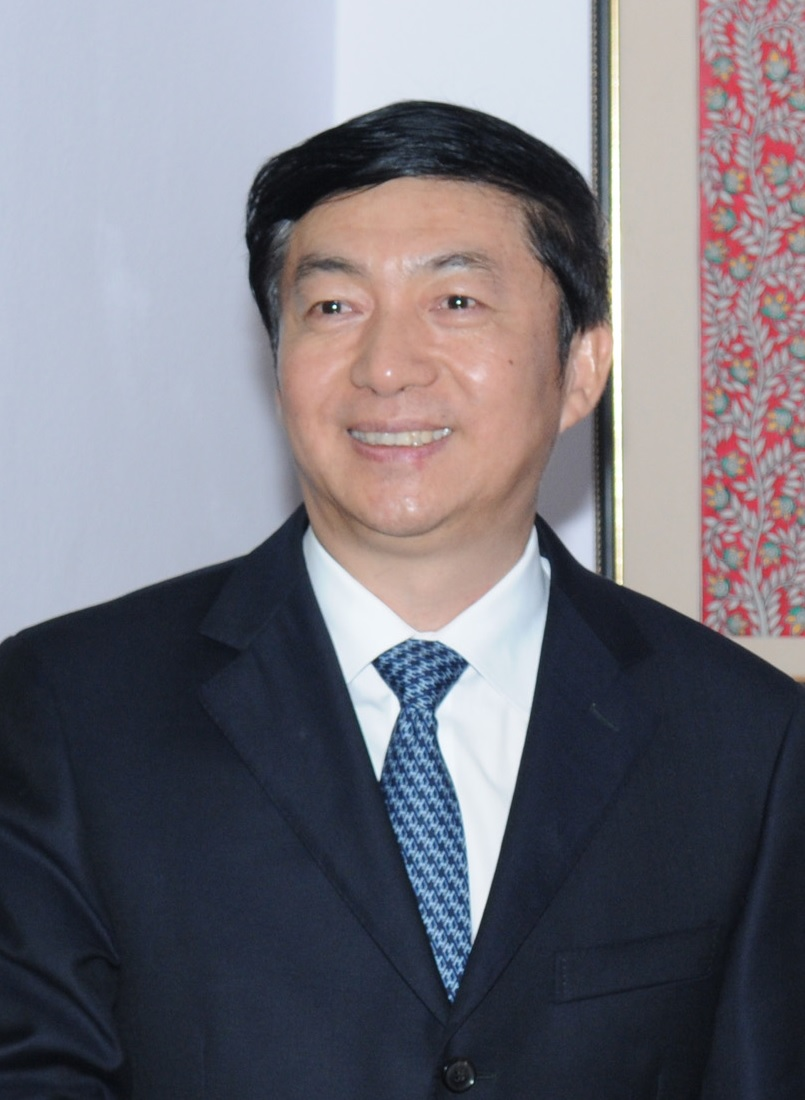
- Luo in 2012

Director of the Liaison Office of the Central People's Government in Hong Kong
- In office 4 January 2020 – 14 January 2023
- Premier: Li Keqiang
- Preceded by: Wang Zhimin
- Succeeded by: Zheng Yanxiong

Party Secretary of Shanxi
- In office 30 June 2016 – 30 November 2019
- Deputy: Lou Yangsheng (Governor)
- Preceded by: Wang Rulin
- Succeeded by: Lou Yangsheng

Party Secretary of Qinghai
- In office 19 March 2013 – 29 June 2016
- Preceded by: Qiang Wei
- Succeeded by: Wang Guosheng

Governor of Qinghai
- In office 30 June 2010 – 28 March 2013
- Preceded by: Song Xiuyan
- Succeeded by: Hao Peng

Personal details
- Born: 5 October 1954 (age 71) Dangtu County, Anhui, China
- Party: Chinese Communist Party
- Education: Anhui University

Luo Huining
- Simplified Chinese: 骆惠宁
- Traditional Chinese: 駱惠寕
Transcriptions
Standard Mandarin
- Hanyu Pinyin: Luò Huìníng

Luo Huining (Chinese: 骆惠宁; born 5 October 1954) is a senior member of the Chinese Communist Party who was the director of the Liaison Office of the Central People's Government in Hong Kong between 2020 and 2023. A native of Yiwu, Zhejiang, he was previously the Governor, then Party Secretary of Qinghai before being appointed Party Secretary of Shanxi.

== Career ==
Luo Huining is a native of his ancestral home of Yiwu, Zhejiang province. He was born in Dangtu County, Anhui province. He entered the work force in 1970 as a sent-down youth in the countryside of Ma'anshan, and in 1971 became a steel worker at the Maanshan Iron and Steel Company.

After the Cultural Revolution, in October 1978 Luo was admitted to the Department of Economics at Anhui University, studying Political Economics. He joined the Chinese Communist Party (CCP) in March 1982 and graduated in August 1982.

After university Luo Huining started working for the provincial government of Anhui, rising to the position of Propaganda Chief of the province in 1999. He had a brief stint as Party Secretary of Chaohu prefecture from 1998 to 1999. He spent the next three years earning a master's degree in management science and engineering the Business School of the Chinese University of Science and Technology and was awarded a doctorate in economics by the People's University of China in 2003.

In April 2003 Luo was transferred from Anhui where he grew up, to distant Qinghai to become a Deputy Party Committee Secretary and president of the Party School of the CCP Provincial Committee. In January 2010, he was promoted to Governor of Qinghai, succeeding Song Xiuyan. In March 2013 he was again promoted to Party Secretary of Qinghai, replacing Qiang Wei who had been transferred to Jiangxi province. During his term, the party pursued increasingly restrictive controls on a large Tibetan minority.

On June 30, 2016, he replaced Wang Rulin as the party secretary of Shanxi where he spoke of his "all-out efforts to enforce party discipline" there.

Luo was an alternate of the 17th Central Committee of the Chinese Communist Party (2007–2012). He has been a full member of the 18th (2012–2017) and 19th (2017–2022) Central Committees.

In January 2020 Luo succeeded Wang Zhimin as the Director of the Liaison Office of the Central People's Government in Hong Kong by a decision of the State Council. His appointment was widely viewed as fall-out from the rout of pro-Beijing candidates in the November 2019 District Council elections.

On 3 July 2020, Xinhua, the official Chinese state news agency, stated that the Committee for Safeguarding National Security of the Hong Kong Special Administrative Region was formally established with 10 members. Luo was appointed as a National Security Advisor to the committee.

In August 2020, Luo and ten other officials were sanctioned by the United States Department of the Treasury under Executive Order 13936 by President Trump for undermining Hong Kong's autonomy. Luo responded: "I can send $100 to Mr. Trump to freeze since I don't have any assets abroad."

On October 14, 2020, the United States Department of State released a report on 10 individuals who materially contributed to the failure of the China to meet its obligations under the Sino–British Joint Declaration and Hong Kong's Basic Law. Luo was on the list.

On January 14, 2023, Lou Huining was succeeded by Zheng Yanxiong as the director of the Liaison Office.

Party political offices
Preceded by Wang Rulin	Party Secretary of Shanxi; 2016–2019	Succeeded by Lou Yangsheng
Preceded by Qiang Wei	Party Secretary of Qinghai; 2013–2016	Succeeded by Wang Guosheng
Government offices
Preceded by Wang Zhimin	Director of the Liaison Office of the Central People's Government in Hong Kong; 2020–2023	Succeeded by Zheng Yanxiong
Preceded by Song Xiuyan	Governor of Qinghai; 2010–2013	Succeeded by Hao Peng
