= Tian Chengping =

Chinese politician

Tian Chengping (Chinese: 田成平; pinyin: Tián Chéngpíng; born January 1945) is a politician in the People's Republic of China.

== Biography ==
Born in Daming County, Hebei Province, Tian joined the Chinese Communist Party (CCP) in April 1964, and started working in February 1968. He served in the Beijing Petrochemical Factory, the Qianjin Chemical Industry Factory affiliated to Beijing Petrochemical Factory, and the Yanshan Petrochemical Corporation. He was appointed the secretary of the CCP committee in the Xicheng District of Beijing in 1984. In 1988, he was transferred to Qinghai Province and served as the vice secretary of the CCP Qinghai committee. He became the acting governor of Qinghai in December 1992, and was confirmed as governor in January 1993. In 1997, he was elevated to the position of secretary of the CCP Qinghai committee. In 1998, he was additionally elected as the chairman of the Qinghai provincial People's Congress. He became the Party chief of Shanxi Province in 1999, and was elected chairman of the Shanxi provincial People's Congress in January 2003. From July 2005 to March 2008, he served as the Minister of Labor and Social Security of China (now the Ministry of Human Resources and Social Security of the People's Republic of China, or MOHRSS).

He is the son of Tian Ying, a former vice governor of Hubei Province.

The younger Tian was an alternate member of the 14th Central Committee of the Chinese Communist Party, and a full member of the 15th, 16th and 17th Central Committees.

Preceded by Hu Fuguo	Communist Party Chief of Shanxi	Succeeded by Zhang Baoshun
Preceded by Guo Yuhuai	CPPCC Committee Chairman of Shanxi	Succeeded by Zheng Shekui
Preceded by Yin Kesheng	Communist Party Chief of Qinghai; 1999	Succeeded by Bai Enpei
Preceded by Jin Jipeng	Governor of Qinghai; 1997	Succeeded by Bai Enpei
