= List of current Chinese provincial leaders =

This is a list of current provincial leaders in the Provinces of the People's Republic of China, including government leaders and Chinese Communist Party Committee Secretaries (labelled Party Secretary), leading provincial party standing committees; provincial legislature speakers (directors of province-level People's Congress Standing Committees (人大常委会主任) or SARs legislature presidents); Government chiefs (mayors, governors, chairpersons of AR, or Chief Executives of SAR); and chairpersons of province-level Chinese People's Political Consultative Conference (CPPCC) committees (政协主席).

== Communist Party Secretaries ==
Female leaders

=== Municipalities ===
Municipality	Incumbent	Image	Birthdate	Birthplace (Ancestry)	Previous office	Took office
Beijing	Yin Li 尹力		August 1962 (age 64)	Linyi, Shandong (Jinan, Shandong)	Party Secretary of Fujian	13 November 2022 (4 years ago)
Tianjin	Chen Min'er 陈敏尔		September 1960 (age 66)	Zhuji, Zhejiang	Party Secretary of Chongqing	8 December 2022 (3 years ago)
Shanghai	Chen Jining 陈吉宁		February 1964 (age 62)	Yingkou, Liaoning (Lishu, Jilin)	Mayor of Beijing	28 October 2022 (4 years ago)
Chongqing	Yuan Jiajun 袁家军		September 1962 (age 64)	Tonghua, Jilin	Party Secretary of Zhejiang	8 December 2022 (3 years ago)

=== Provinces ===
Province	Incumbent	Image	Birthdate	Birthplace (Ancestry)	Previous office	Took office
Hebei	Luo Wen 罗文		December 1964 (age 61)	Anren County, Hunan	Director of the State Administration for Market Regulation	31 July 2026 (3 months ago)
Shanxi	Tang Dengjie 唐登杰		June 1964 (age 62)	Shanghai	Minister of Civil Affairs	28 October 2023 (3 years ago)
Liaoning	Xu Kunlin 许昆林		May 1965 (age 61)	Yongchun, Fujian	Governor of Jiangsu	30 September 2025 (13 months ago)
Jilin	Huang Qiang 黄强		April 1963 (age 63)	Dongyang, Zhejiang	Governor of Sichuan	28 June 2024 (2 years ago)
Heilongjiang	Xu Qin 许勤		October 1961 (age 65)	Lianyungang, Jiangsu	Governor of Hebei	19 October 2021 (5 years ago)
Jiangsu	Xin Changxing 信长星		December 1963 (age 62)	Huimin, Shandong	Party Secretary of Qinghai	3 January 2023 (3 years ago)
Zhejiang	Wang Hao 王浩		October 1963 (age 63)	Shan, Shandong	Governor of Zhejiang	28 October 2024 (2 years ago)
Anhui	Li Lecheng 李乐成		March 1965 (age 61)	Jianli, Hubei	Minister of Industry and Information Technology	23 September 2026 (54 days ago)
Fujian	Zhao Long 赵龙		September 1967 (age 59)	Panjin, Liaoning	Governor of Fujian	23 September 2026 (54 days ago)
Jiangxi	Yin Hong 尹弘		June 1963 (age 63)	Huzhou, Zhejiang	Party Secretary of Gansu	7 December 2022 (3 years ago)
Shandong	Lin Wu 林武		February 1962 (age 64)	Minhou, Fujian	Party Secretary of Shanxi	29 December 2022 (3 years ago)
Henan	Zhou Zuyi 周祖翼		January 1965 (age 61)	Tiantai, Zhejiang	Party Secretary of Fujian	23 September 2026 (54 days ago)
Hubei	Guan Zhi'ou 关志鸥		December 1969 (age 56)	Shenyang, Liaoning	Minister of Natural Resources	30 May 2026 (5 months ago)
Hunan	Wang Zhijun 王志军		September 1965 (age 61)	Hohhot, Inner Mongolia	Executive Deputy Secretary-General of the State Council	24 October 2026 (23 days ago)
Guangdong	Huang Kunming 黄坤明		November 1956 (age 69–70)	Shanghang, Fujian	Head of Publicity Department of the Chinese Communist Party	28 October 2022 (4 years ago)
Hainan	Feng Fei 冯飞		December 1962 (age 63)	Duchang, Jiangxi	Governor of Hainan	14 March 2023 (3 years ago)
Sichuan	Wang Xiaohui 王晓晖		August 1962 (age 64)	Changling, Jilin	Executive deputy head of Publicity Department of the Chinese Communist Party	22 April 2022 (4 years ago)
Guizhou	Xu Lin 徐麟		June 1963 (age 63)	Shanghai	Director of the National Radio and Television Administration	9 December 2022 (3 years ago)
Yunnan	Mo Gaoyi 莫高义		December 1964 (age 61)	Shishou, Hubei	Director of the State Council Information Office	24 October 2026 (23 days ago)
Shaanxi	Zhao Yide 赵一德		February 1965 (age 61)	Wenling, Zhejiang	Governor of Shaanxi	27 November 2022 (3 years ago)
Gansu	Wu Xiaojun 吴晓军		January 1966 (age 60)	Taihe, Jiangxi	Party Secretary of Qinghai	22 September 2026 (55 days ago)
Qinghai	Luo Dongchuan 罗东川		October 1965 (age 61)	Chongqing	Governor of Qinghai	22 September 2026 (55 days ago)

=== Autonomous regions ===
AR	Incumbent	Image	Birthdate	Birthplace (Ancestry)	Previous office	Took office
Inner Mongolia	Wang Weizhong 王伟中		March 1962 (age 64)	Shuozhou, Shanxi	Governor of Guangdong	30 September 2025 (13 months ago)
Guangxi	Chen Gang 陈刚		April 1965 (age 61)	Gaoyou, Jiangsu	Party Secretary of Qinghai	31 December 2024 (22 months ago)
Tibet	Hu Changsheng 胡昌升		December 1963 (age 62)	Gao'an, Jiangxi	Party Secretary of Gansu	22 September 2026 (55 days ago)
Ningxia	Li Yifei 李邑飞		January 1964 (age 62)	Mojiang, Yunnan	Political Commissar of Xinjiang Production and Construction Corps	28 June 2024 (2 years ago)
Xinjiang	Chen Xiaojiang 陈小江		June 1962 (age 64)	Longyou, Zhejiang	Executive Deputy Head of the United Front Work Department	1 July 2025 (16 months ago)

=== Special Administrative Regions ===
SAR	CCP Working Committee	Image	Birthdate	Birthplace (Ancestry)	Previous office	Took office
Hong Kong	Zhou Ji 周霁		1 May 1964 (age 62)	Xiangyang, Hubei	Deputy Director of the Hong Kong and Macao Work Office	30 May 2025 (17 months ago)
Macau	Zheng Xincong 郑新聪		November 1963 (age 62–63)	Xianyou, Fujian	State security technical consultant of the State Security Defense Commission of Macao Special Administrative Region	30 May 2022 (4 years ago)

== Legislature speakers ==
Female leaders

=== Municipalities ===
Municipality	Incumbent	Image	Birthdate	Birthplace (Ancestry)	Previous office	Took office
Beijing	Li Xiuling 李秀领		December 1962 (age 63)	Tongshan, Jiangsu	Chairman of Inner Mongolia CPPCC Committee	January 2023 (3 years ago)
Shanghai	Huang Lixin 黄莉新		August 1962 (age 64)	Suqian, Jiangsu	Chairwoman of the Zhejiang Provincial CPPCC	24 January 2024 (2 years ago)
Tianjin	Yu Yunlin 喻云林		December 1962 (age 63)	Anxiang, Hunan	Vice Director of Tianjin Municipal People's Congress	January 2023 (3 years ago)
Chongqing	Wang Jiong 王炯		September 1964 (age 62)	Luan County, Hebei	Chairman of Chongqing CPPCC Committee	January 2023 (3 years ago)

=== Provinces ===
Province	Incumbent	Image	Birthdate	Birthplace (Ancestry)	Previous office	Took office
Hebei	Ni Yuefeng 倪岳峰		September 1964 (age 62)	Yuexi, Anhui	N/A (serving concurrently as the Provincial Party Secretary)	15 January 2023 (3 years ago)
Shanxi	Tang Dengjie 唐登杰		June 1964 (age 62)	Shanghai	N/A (serving concurrently as the Provincial Party Secretary)	January 2024 (2 years ago)
Liaoning	Xu Kunlin 许昆林		May 1965 (age 61)	Yongchun, Fujian	N/A (serving concurrently as the Provincial Party Secretary)	30 January 2026 (9 months ago)
Jilin	Huang Qiang 黄强		April 1963 (age 63)	Dongyang, Zhejiang	N/A (serving concurrently as the Provincial Party Secretary)	17 January 2025 (21 months ago)
Heilongjiang	Xu Qin 许勤		October 1961 (age 65)	Lianyungang, Jiangsu	N/A (serving concurrently as the Provincial Party Secretary)	26 January 2022 (4 years ago)
Jiangsu	Xin Changxing 信长星		December 1963 (age 62)	Huimin, Shandong	N/A (serving concurrently as the Provincial Party Secretary)	January 2023 (3 years ago)
Zhejiang	Wang Hao 王浩		October 1963 (age 63)	Shan, Shandong	N/A (serving concurrently as the Provincial Party Secretary)	17 January 2025 (21 months ago)
Anhui	Vacant since 23 September 2026					
Fujian	Zhou Zuyi 周祖翼		January 1965 (age 61)	Tiantai, Zhejiang	N/A (serving concurrently as the Provincial Party Secretary)	January 2023 (3 years ago)
Jiangxi	Yin Hong 尹弘		June 1963 (age 63)	Huzhou, Zhejiang	N/A (serving concurrently as the Provincial Party Secretary)	January 2023 (3 years ago)
Shandong	Lin Wu 林武		February 1962 (age 64)	Minhou, Fujian	N/A (serving concurrently as the Provincial Party Secretary)	January 2023 (3 years ago)
Henan	Liu Ning 刘宁		January 1962 (age 64)	Linjiang, Jilin	N/A (serving concurrently as the Provincial Party Secretary)	21 January 2025 (21 months ago)
Hubei	Wang Zhonglin 王忠林		August 1962 (age 64)	Fei County, Shandong	N/A (serving concurrently as the Provincial Party Secretary)	20 January 2025 (21 months ago)
Hunan	Shen Xiaoming 沈晓明		May 1963 (age 63)	Shangyu, Zhejiang	N/A (serving concurrently as the Provincial Party Secretary)	14 March 2023 (3 years ago)
Guangdong	Huang Chuping 黄楚平		October 1962 (age 64)	Huanggang, Hubei	Chairman of the CPPCC Hubei Committee	January 2022 (4 years ago)
Hainan	Feng Fei 冯飞		December 1962 (age 63)	Duchang, Jiangxi	N/A (serving concurrently as the Provincial Party Secretary)	May 2023 (3 years ago)
Sichuan	Wang Xiaohui 王晓晖		August 1962 (age 64)	Changling, Jilin	N/A (serving concurrently as the Provincial Party Secretary)	January 2023 (3 years ago)
Guizhou	Xu Lin 徐麟		June 1963 (age 63)	Shanghai	N/A (serving concurrently as the Provincial Party Secretary)	January 2023 (3 years ago)
Yunnan	Wang Ning 王宁		April 1961 (age 65)	Shenyang, Liaoning (Xiangxiang, Hunan)	N/A (serving concurrently as the Provincial Party Secretary)	23 January 2022 (4 years ago)
Shaanxi	Zhao Yide 赵一德		February 1965 (age 61)	Wenling, Zhejiang	N/A (serving concurrently as the Provincial Party Secretary)	January 2023 (3 years ago)
Gansu	Hu Changsheng 胡昌升		December 1963 (age 62)	Gao'an, Jiangxi	N/A (serving concurrently as the Provincial Party Secretary)	January 2023 (3 years ago)
Qinghai	Wu Xiaojun 吴晓军		January 1966 (age 60)	Taihe, Jiangxi	N/A (serving concurrently as the Provincial Party Secretary)	23 January 2025 (21 months ago)

=== Autonomous regions ===
AR	Incumbent	Image	Birthdate	Birthplace (Ancestry)	Previous office	Took office
Inner Mongolia	Wang Weizhong 王伟中		March 1962 (age 64)	Shuozhou, Shanxi	N/A (serving concurrently as the Autonomous Regional Party Secretary)	18 October 2025 (12 months ago)
Guangxi	Chen Gang 陈刚		April 1965 (age 61)	Gaoyou, Jiangsu	N/A (serving concurrently as the Autonomous Regional Party Secretary)	17 January 2025 (21 months ago)
Tibet	Yan Jinhai 严金海 ཡན་ཅིན་ཧའེ		March 1962 (age 64)	Minhe, Qinghai	Chairman of Tibet	22 January 2025 (21 months ago)
Ningxia	Li Yifei 李邑飞		January 1964 (age 62)	Mojiang, Yunnan	N/A (serving concurrently as the Autonomous Regional Party Secretary)	22 January 2025 (21 months ago)
Xinjiang	Zumret Obul 祖木热提·吾布力 زۇمرەت ئوبۇل		May 1965 (age 61)	Kashgar, Xinjiang	Head of Xinjiang Autonomous Regional United Front Work Department of CCP	January 2023 (3 years ago)

=== Special Administrative Regions ===
SAR	Incumbent	Image	Birthdate	Birthplace (Ancestry)	Previous office	Took office
Hong Kong	Starry Lee 李慧琼		13 March 1974 (age 52)	Hong Kong (Nanhai, Guangdong)	Deputy President of the Legislative Council	8 January 2026 (10 months ago)
Macau	André Cheong Weng Chon 張永春		September 1966 (age 60)	Beijing	Secretary for Administration and Justice of Macau	16 October 2025 (13 months ago)

== Government chiefs ==
=== Municipalities ===
Municipality	Mayor	Image	Birthdate	Birthplace (Ancestry)	Previous office	Took office
Beijing	Yin Yong 殷勇		August 1969 (age 57)	Wuhan, Hubei	Deputy Mayor of Beijing	28 October 2022 (4 years ago)
Tianjin	Zhang Gong 张工		August 1961 (age 65)	Beijing	Director of the State Administration for Market Regulation	31 May 2022 (4 years ago)
Shanghai	Zhu Zhongming 朱忠明; Acting		April 1972 (age 54)	Haining, Zhejiang	Deputy Secretary of the Shanghai Municipal Committee of the Chinese Communist Party	4 September 2026 (2 months ago)
Chongqing	Chen Xinwu 陈新武; Acting		July 1968 (age 58)	Huanggang, Hubei	Deputy Secretary of the Party Group of Chongqing Municipal People's Government	31 July 2026 (3 months ago)

=== Provinces ===
Province	Governor	Image	Birthdate	Birthplace (Ancestry)	Previous office	Took office
Hebei	Zhao Chenxin 赵辰昕; Acting		September 1969 (age 57)	Raoyang, Hebei	Deputy Governor of Hebei	25 October 2026 (22 days ago)
Shanxi	Lu Dongliang 卢东亮		December 1973 (age 52)	Kangping, Liaoning	Party Secretary of Datong	3 June 2025 (17 months ago)
Liaoning	Wang Xinwei 王新伟		August 1967 (age 59)	Baofeng, Henan	Party Secretary of Shenyang	1 March 2025 (20 months ago)
Jilin	Hu Yuting 胡玉亭		July 1964 (age 62)	Wutai, Shanxi	Party Secretary of Dalian	2 April 2023 (3 years ago)
Heilongjiang	Liang Huiling 梁惠玲		August 1962 (age 64)	Yicheng, Hubei	Chairwoman of the All-China Federation of Supply and Marketing Cooperatives	9 December 2022 (3 years ago)
Jiangsu	Liu Xiaotao 刘小涛		July 1970 (age 56)	Xingning, Guangdong	Party Secretary of Suzhou	9 October 2025 (13 months ago)
Zhejiang	Liu Jie 刘捷		January 1970 (age 56)	Danyang, Jiangsu	Specifically-designated Deputy Party Secretary of Zhejiang and Party Secretary of Hangzhou	18 December 2024 (22 months ago)
Anhui	Wang Dongwei 王东伟; Acting		September 1969 (age 57)	Tanghe, Henan	Vice Governor of Anhui	23 September 2026 (54 days ago)
Fujian	Guo Ningning 郭宁宁; Acting		July 1970 (age 56)	Shenyang, Liaoning	Party Secretary of Fuzhou	4 November 2026 (12 days ago)
Jiangxi	Chen Yongqi 陈永奇; Acting		November 1967 (age 58–59)	Huairen, Shanxi	Full-time Deputy Secretary of Jiangxi; Secretary of the Political and Legal Affairs Commission of the CCP Jiangxi Provincial Committee	11 November 2026 (5 days ago)
Shandong	Zhou Naixiang 周乃翔		December 1961 (age 64)	Yixing, Jiangsu	Chairman of China State Construction Engineering; Party Secretary of Suzhou	30 September 2021 (5 years ago)
Henan	Wang Lujin 王陆进; Acting		October 1968 (age 58)	Danyang, Jiangsu	Deputy Party Secretary of Hebei	24 September 2026 (53 days ago)
Hubei	Li Dianxun 李殿勋		November 1967 (age 58–59)	Shangcai County, Henan	Deputy Party Secretary of Hunan	2 January 2025 (22 months ago)
Hunan	Xie Weijiang 谢卫江; Acting		January 1973 (age 53)	Fugou, Henan	Deputy Party Secretary of Hunan	30 October 2026 (17 days ago)
Guangdong	Meng Fanli 孟凡利		September 1965 (age 61)	Linyi, Shandong	Deputy Party Secretary of Guangdong; Party Secretary of Shenzhen	11 October 2025 (13 months ago)
Hainan	Liu Xiaoming 刘小明		September 1964 (age 62)	Yangzhong, Jiangsu	Full-time Deputy Secretary of Guangxi	2 April 2023 (3 years ago)
Sichuan	Shi Xiaolin 施小琳		May 1969 (age 57)	Yuyao, Zhejiang	Deputy secretary of the CCP Sichuan Provincial Committee	4 July 2024 (2 years ago)
Guizhou	Li Bingjun 李炳军		February 1963 (age 63)	Linqu, Shandong	Deputy Party Secretary of Jiangxi	24 November 2020 (5 years ago)
Yunnan	Liu Qifan 刘奇凡; Acting		April 1967 (age 59)	Shuicheng, Guizhou	Deputy Party Secretary of Qinghai	2 November 2026 (14 days ago)
Shaanxi	Zhao Gang 赵刚		June 1968 (age 58)	Xinmin, Liaoning	Party Secretary of Yan'an	1 December 2022 (3 years ago)
Gansu	Kong Shaoxun 孔绍逊		February 1969 (age 57)	Zhongning, Ningxia	Deputy Director of the General Office of the Chinese Communist Party	2 September 2026 (2 months ago)
Qinghai	Zhuge Yujie 诸葛宇杰; Acting		May 1971 (age 55)	Shanghai	Deputy Party Secretary of Hubei	30 October 2026 (17 days ago)

=== Autonomous regions ===
AR	Chairperson	Image	Birthdate	Birthplace (Ancestry)	Previous office	Took office
Inner Mongolia	Bao Gang 包钢 ᠪᠠᠣ ᠭᠠᠩ		May 1969 (age 57)	Fuxin, Liaoning	Communist Party Secretary of Hohhot	13 October 2025 (13 months ago)
Guangxi	Wei Tao 韦韬; Veiz Dauh		April 1970 (age 56)	Luocheng, Guangxi	Communist Party Secretary of Taiyuan	3 July 2025 (16 months ago)
Tibet	Garma Cedain 嘎玛泽登 སྐར་མ་ཚེ་བརྟན		December 1967 (age 58)	Jomda, Tibet	Deputy Party Secretary of Tibet	28 November 2024 (23 months ago)
Ningxia	Zhang Yupu 张雨浦		August 1962 (age 64)	Changqing, Shandong	Party Secretary of Ningxia Government	9 May 2022 (4 years ago)
Xinjiang	Erkin Tuniyaz 艾尔肯·吐尼亚孜 ئەركىن تۇنىياز		December 1961 (age 64)	Aksu, Xinjiang	Vice Chairman of Xinjiang Uyghur Autonomous Region	30 September 2021 (5 years ago)

=== Special Administrative Regions ===
SAR	Chief Executive	Image	Birthdate	Birthplace (Ancestry)	Previous office	Took office
Hong Kong	John Lee Ka-chiu 李家超		7 December 1957 (age 68)	Hong Kong (Panyu, Guangdong)	Chief Secretary for Administration of Hong Kong	1 July 2022 (4 years ago)
Macau	Sam Hou Fai 岑浩輝		May 1962 (age 64)	Zhongshan, Guangdong	President of the Court of Final Appeal of Macau	20 December 2024 (22 months ago)

== Chairpersons of CPPCC Committee ==
Female leaders

=== Municipalities ===
Municipality	Incumbent	Image	Birthdate	Birthplace (Ancestry)	Previous office	Took office
Beijing	Vacant since June 2026					
Shanghai	Hu Wenrong 胡文容		July 1964 (age 62)	Putian, Fujian	Head of the Organization Department of the Shanghai Municipal Committee of the Chinese Communist Party	January 2023 (3 years ago)
Tianjin	Wang Changsong 王常松		July 1962 (age 64)	Wuwei, Anhui	Head of the Jiangsu Provincial Commission for Discipline Inspection	January 2023 (3 years ago)
Chongqing	Cheng Lihua 程丽华		April 1965 (age 61)	Xining, Qinghai	Deputy Party Secretary of Anhui	January 2024 (2 years ago)

=== Provinces ===
Province	Incumbent	Image	Birthdate	Birthplace (Ancestry)	Previous office	Took office
Hebei	Zhang Guohua 张国华		November 1964 (age 61–62)	Wujiang, Jiangsu	Party Branch Secretary of Hebei CPPCC Committee	January 2024 (2 years ago)
Shanxi	Zhang Chunlin 张春林		February 1965 (age 61)	Deyang, Sichuan	Deputy party secretary of Shanxi	January 2025 (1 year ago)
Liaoning	Zhou Bo 周波		June 1962 (age 64)	Shanghai	Executive Deputy Party Secretary of Liaoning	January 2021 (5 years ago)
Jilin	Zhu Guoxian 朱国贤		September 1964 (age 62)	Yiwu, Zhejiang	Deputy Party Secretary of Hunan	January 2023 (3 years ago)
Heilongjiang	Lan Shaomin 蓝绍敏		January 1964 (age 62)	Dabu, Guangdong	head of the Organization Department of Heilongjiang Provincial CPPCC	January 2023 (3 years ago)
Jiangsu	Zhang Yizhen 张义珍		August 1964 (age 62)	Anguo, Hebei	Executive Deputy Party Secretary of Jiangsu	January 2022 (4 years ago)
Zhejiang	Lian Yimin 廉毅敏		March 5, 1964 (age 62)	Pingyao, Shanxi	Chairman of the Hebei Provincial CPPCC	January 2024 (2 years ago)
Anhui	Zhang Ximing 张西明		February 1965 (age 61)	Dingtao, Shandong	Vice Chairman of the Anhui Provincial CPPCC	February 2026 (9 months ago)
Fujian	Teng Jiacai 滕佳材		December 1964 (age 61)	Donggang, Liaoning	Leader of the Discipline Inspection Team sent by Central Commission for Discipline Inspection & National Supervisory Commission to the National Health Commission	January 2023 (3 years ago)
Jiangxi	Song Fulong 宋福龙		August 1964 (age 62)	Qingyuan, Hebei	Secretary of Guangdong Commission for Discipline Inspection & Director of Guangdong Supervisory Commission	January 2025 (1 year ago)
Shandong	Ge Huijun 葛慧君		March 1963 (age 63)	Zhuji, Zhejiang	Chairwoman of the Zhejiang Provincial CPPCC	January 2022 (4 years ago)
Henan	Kong Changsheng 孔昌生		February 1963 (age 63)	Jingning, Gansu	Head of the Organization Department of the Henan Provincial People's Congress	January 2023 (3 years ago)
Hubei	Sun Wei 孙伟		December 1961 (age 64)	Penglai, Shandong	Executive Deputy Party Secretary of Gansu	January 2022 (4 years ago)
Hunan	Mao Wanchun 毛万春		October 1961 (age 65)	Tangyin, Henan	Chairman of the Hainan Provincial CPPCC	January 2023 (3 years ago)
Guangdong	Lin Keqing 林克庆		October 1966 (age 60)	Xiantao, Hubei	Party Secretary of Guangzhou	January 2023 (3 years ago)
Hainan	Li Rongcan 李荣灿		September 1966 (age 60)	Shaoxing, Zhejiang	Deputy Party Secretary of Hubei	January 2023 (3 years ago)
Sichuan	Tian Xiangli 田向利		March 1963 (age 63)	Xingtai, Hebei	United Front Work Department of the Sichuan CCP Committee	January 2022 (4 years ago)
Guizhou	Zhao Yongqing 赵永清		April 1963 (age 63)	Linqu, Shandong	Vice Chairman of Ningxia CPPCC Committee	January 2023 (3 years ago)
Yunnan	Liu Xiaokai 刘晓凯		March 1962 (age 64)	Taijiang, Guizhou	Chairman of the Guizhou Provincial CPPCC Committee	January 2023 (3 years ago)
Shaanxi	Xu Xinrong 徐新荣		April 1962 (age 64)	Qian County, Shaanxi	Party Secretary of Yan'an	January 2022 (4 years ago)
Gansu	Zhuang Guotai 庄国泰		April 1962 (age 64)	Quanzhou, Fujian	Minister responsible for China Meteorological Administration	January 2023 (3 years ago)
Qinghai	Gönbo Zhaxi 公保扎西 མགོན་པོ་བཀྲ་ཤིས་		October 1962 (age 64)	Hualong, Qinghai	Head of the United Front Work Department of Qinghai Provincial Committee of CCP	January 2022 (4 years ago)

=== Autonomous regions ===
AR	Incumbent	Image	Birthdate	Birthplace (Ancestry)	Previous office	Took office
Inner Mongolia	Zhang Yankun 张延昆		January 1963 (age 63)	Fangcheng, Hebei	Chairman of Beijing Municipal Federation of Trade Unions	January 2023 (3 years ago)
Guangxi	Sun Dawei 孙大伟		April 1963 (age 63)	Anda, Heilongjiang	Executive Deputy Party Secretary of Guangxi	January 2021 (5 years ago)
Tibet	Pagbalha Geleg Namgyai 帕巴拉·格列朗杰 འཕགས་པ་ལྷ་དགེ་ལེགས་རྣམ་རྒྱལ་		February 1940 (age 86)	Litang, Sichuan	Vice Chairman of Tibet Autonomous Region, Vice Director of Tibet Autonomous Regional People's Congress Standing Committee, Vice Chairman of the CPPCC, Vice Chairman of the Tibet Autonomous Regional CPPCC	January 1993 (33 years ago)
Ningxia	Chen Yong 陈雍		October 1966 (age 60)	Beizhen, Liaoning	Deputy Party Secretary of Ningxia	January 2023 (3 years ago)
Xinjiang	Nurlan Abilmazhinuly 努尔兰·阿不都满金 نۇرلان ٴابىلماجىن ۇلى		December 1962 (age 63)	Huocheng, Xinjiang	Member of CCP Xinjiang Autonomous Regional Standing Committee	January 2013 (13 years ago)

== See also ==
- Provincial party standing committee

== Notes ==
- All government leaders in mainland are Chinese Communist Party members.
- According to the Constitution of China, the chairman of an autonomous region, the prefect of an autonomous prefecture or the governor of an autonomous county shall be a member of the ethnic group exercising regional autonomy in the area concerned.
- A "nominated" government leader has been appointed as the government party committee secretary and nominated as the new government leader, but has not received final confirmation from the provincial people's congress.
- Both Chief Executives of Hong Kong and Macau are nonpartisans.
- This list excludes the leaders of claimed Taiwan Province and the fragment of Fujian Province which is being governed by the Republic of China currently.
