= Chen Gang (politician, born 1966) =

Chinese politician (born 1966)

- 陈刚

Executive Secretary of the China Association for Science and Technology
- In office 2018 – January 2019

Vice-Mayor of Beijing
- In office October 2006 – February 2017

Personal details
- Born: May 1966 (age 60) Chongyang County, Hubei, China
- Party: Chinese Communist Party
- Education: Tsinghua University

Chinese name
- Traditional Chinese: 陳剛
- Simplified Chinese: 陈刚
Transcriptions
Standard Mandarin
- Hanyu Pinyin: Chén Gāng

Chen Gang (Chinese: 陈刚; born May 1966) is a former Chinese politician. Best known for his term in Beijing beginning in 2006, Chen played a prominent role in constructing the venues of the Beijing Olympics and subsequent urban development projects. Elevated to the municipal standing committee in 2012, Chen seemed destined for higher office. However, he was abruptly moved to the North-South Water Transfer project in 2017. He was disgraced in 2019 and is currently under investigation for graft.

== Career ==
Chen was born in Chongyang County, Hubei province. He joined the Chinese Communist Party (CCP) in May 1988. He obtained a graduate degree in urban planning from Tsinghua University, and a master's degree in engineering. He joined the Communist Youth League while attending university. He has served as assistant to the mayor of Liuzhou, Guangxi, and worked in the urban planning department in that city. He has also served as the deputy director of the Beijing Urban-Rural Planning Commission, and director of the Beijing Urban Planning Commission. In 2006, he was then made the Vice Mayor of Beijing, replacing Liu Zhihua, who had been dismissed on corruption charges. It was said that Chen enjoyed a close relationship with Liu Qi.

In 2012, Chen rose in rank to second out of nine vice mayors, and also became a member of the Beijing Party Standing Committee. At the time, he sat on the same leadership body as Chen Gang (born 1965), creating an odd situation where two Chen Gang's of the same name (in written form and in pronunciation) needed a disambiguating identifier at party meetings. The younger Chen Gang was Chen Gang (government), while the older Chen Gang was known as Chen Gang (Chaoyang District).

In Beijing, Chen was put in charge of land use, development, housing and urban construction, and rail projects. The breadth of his portfolio made him a frequent subject of media reports. He was a prominent figure in the development of the secondary city center of the Beijing, the development of the Beijing Central Business District, he re-development of the Capital Steelworks industrial area, and the Beijing Olympic Park and Wukesong Cultural and Sports complex, as well as a wide range of other sporting venues.

He seemed to have a promising political future. In 2012, he was made an alternate of the 18th Central Committee of the Chinese Communist Party. In October 2016, Cai Qi became party chief of Beijing; this was followed by a series of consequential changes to the Beijing political scene. Executive Vice Mayor Li Shixiang (later disgraced) was placed in a ceremonial position, and Chen was unceremoniously transferred to the office of the South-North Water Transfer Project as a deputy director. At the party meeting where his departure was announced, Chen stated that he taken to heart the feedback by the central inspection teams and gave thanks for what he called "spicy criticism" (辣味批评) by the emissaries. This was seen as an ominous sign. In 2018, he was again transferred to become a member of the secretariat of the China Association of Science and Technology.

== Investigation ==
On January 6, 2019, Chen Gang was placed under investigation by the Central Commission for Discipline Inspection, the CCP's internal disciplinary body, and the National Supervisory Commission, the highest anti-corruption agency of the People's Republic of China, for "serious violations of regulations and laws". He was expelled from the CCP on July 11. On November 7, his trial was held at the Intermediate People's Court of Nanjing. The public prosecutors accused him of abusing his positions between 2003 and 2018 to build luxurious gardens for personal use, occupy luxury hotel suites for years without paying and accept tourism offers that could have affected the fair performance of official duties, use his power for planning and approval to enrich himself and his relatives' business activities, trade power for money, and accept huge bribes. In 2019 he pleaded guilty to bribery.

On 5 February Chen had sentenced 15 years in prison and fined 5 million yuan ($774,500) for taking bribes worth more than 128 million yuan ($19.96 million) by the Intermediate People's Court of Nanjing.

Chen was linked to real estate mogul Guo Wengui. It was said that Guo used his relationship with disgraced former Ministry of State Security deputy chief Ma Jian to ask Chen Gang, then in charge of Beijing's planning and urban development work, to help reduce a financial penalty against Guo, whose company was said to have violated municipal zoning and development restrictions. Reportedly, in 2013, Guo was again assessed a fine for encroaching public land while building a private residence in the Houhai area of Beijing. However, Chen reportedly said his hands were tied and refused to take action on Guo's behalf. The Guo-Chen-Ma relationship triangle was reportedly confirmed by Ma's own testimony during trial and also through online videos in which Ma described his relationship with Guo Wengui.
