= Wang Xuefeng =

Wang Xuefeng, may refer to:

- Wang Xuefeng (politician, born 1954), Chinese politician, party secretary of Tangshan, vice chairman of Hebei Provincial People's Congress
- Wang Xuefeng (diplomat) (born 1966), Chinese politician and diplomat, the current ambassador to Botswana, former ambassador to Samoa
