= Zhang Guohua =

Zhang Guohua, may refer to:

- Zhang Guohua (military officer), military officer of the Northern Expedition and the Battle of Songhu.
- Zhang Guohua (politician, born 1914), governor of Sichuan, party secretary of Tibet Autonomous Region.
- Zhang Guohua (politician, born 1964), chairman of the Hebei Provincial Committee of the Chinese People's Political Consultative Conference.
