= Jiang Deguo =

Chinese politician

- 姜德果

Vice Chairman of the Hebei Provincial Committee of the Chinese People's Political Consultative Conference
- In office January 2017 – January 2018
- Chairman: Fu Zhifang

Vice Governor of Hebei
- In office January 2013 – January 2017
- Governor: Zhang Qingwei

Personal details
- Born: January 1957 (age 69) Fucheng County, Hebei, China
- Party: Chinese Communist Party (1984-2026, expelled)
- Education: Hebei University; Nanyang Technological University

Jiang Deguo (Chinese: 姜德果; pinyin: Jiāng Déguó; born January 1957) is a former Chinese politician who spent his entire career in north China's Hebei province. His political career, which had systematically progressed through a series of prominent roles including magistrate and party secretary of Wuyi County, mayor and party secretary of key prefecture-level cities such as Xingtai, Shijiazhuang, and Tangshan, vice governor of Hebei, and ultimately vice chairman of the Hebei Provincial Committee of the Chinese People's Political Consultative Conference (CPPCC), was definitively redefined by a disciplinary investigation initiated by China's top anti-graft watchdog in September 2025, seven years after his retirement from official government service.

Jiang was a delegate to the 11th and 12th National People's Congress.

== Early life and education ==
Jiang was born in Fucheng County, Hebei in January 1957. After the Cultural Revolution in 1976, he worked as communications reporter in Hou'an People's Commune. After the resumption of the college entrance examination, in 1978, he enrolled at Hebei University, where he majored in Chinese language and literature. He also pursued advanced studies in management economics at the Business School of Nanyang Technological University in Singapore, earning a master's degree in management economics.

== Career ==
After University 1982, Jiang became an official in the Office of the Hengshui Prefecture Administrative Office and in November 1985 was transferred to the Office of the CCP Hengshui Municipal Committee. He joined the Chinese Communist Party (CCP) in December 1984. He was deputy party secretary of Wuyi County in September 1988, in addition to serving as magistrate since June 1992. In February 1993, he rose to become party secretary, the top political position in the county. He was appointed secretary-general of the CCP Hengshui Municipal Committee and two months later was admitted to standing committee member of the CCP Hengshui Municipal Committee, the city's top authority.

In July 2001, Jiang was made deputy party secretary of Changde, concurrently serving as secretary of the Discipline Inspection Commission.

In October 2004, Jiang was named acting mayor of Xingtai, confirmed in January 2005. In October 2008, he was elevated to party secretary, the top political position in the city.

He was appointed deputy party secretary of Shijiazhuang, capital of Hebei province, in December 2011, concurrently holding the mayor position since January 2012.

In January 2013, Jiang reached the pinnacle of his political career when he was promoted to vice governor of Hebei, a position at vice-provincial level. He also served as party secretary of Tangshan from February 2013 to September 2014. In January 2017, he was chosen as vice chairman of the Hebei Provincial Committee of the Chinese People's Political Consultative Conference (CPPCC), the provincial advisory body. He retired in January 2018.

Post-retirement, Jiang served as president of the Hebei Old Revolutionary Areas Construction Promotion Association, participating in public events as recently as August 2025.

== Investigation ==
On 20 September 2025, Jiang was put under investigation for alleged "serious violations of discipline and laws" by the Central Commission for Discipline Inspection (CCDI), the party's internal disciplinary body, and the National Supervisory Commission, the highest anti-corruption agency of China. His case is part of a broader anti-corruption campaign in Hebei, following the investigation of Chen Yongjiu (陈永久), former director of the Hebei Development and Reform Commission, in August 2025. Jiang was expelled from the party on 2 March 2026.

Government offices
Preceded by Zhang Hongyi	Mayor of Xingtai; 2005–2008	Succeeded by Liu Daqun
Preceded by Ai Wenli	Mayor of Shijiazhuang; 2013–2014	Succeeded by Wang Liang
Party political offices
Preceded by Dong Jingwei	Communist Party Secretary of Xingtai; 2008–2011	Succeeded by Wang Aimin
Preceded by Wang Xuefeng	Communist Party Secretary of Tangshan; 2013–2014	Succeeded by 焦彦龙
