= Jintang =

Jintang may refer to the following locations in China:

- Jintang County (金堂县), Chengdu, Sichuan
- Jintang Island (金塘岛), in Zhoushan, Zhejiang
- Jintang Township (金塘乡), Qiaojia County, Yunnan

Towns (金塘镇)

- Jintang, Maoming, town in Maonan District, Maoming, Guangdong
- Jintang, Chongyang County, town in Chongyang County, Hubei
- Jintang, Zhoushan, town in Dinghai District, Zhoushan, Zhejiang
