= Hebei Provincial Committee of the Chinese People's Political Consultative Conference =

Hebei Provincial Committee of the Chinese People's Political Consultative Conference 中国人民政治协商会议河北省委员会
- 13th
- Emblem of the Chinese People's Political Consultative Conference

Type
- Type: United front organ Constitutional convention (Historical); Legislature (Historical) of Chinese People's Political Consultative Conference

History
- Founded: February 1955; 71 years ago
- Preceded by: Hebei Provincial People's Congress Consultative Committee

Leadership
- Chairperson: Zhang Guohua

Website
- www.hebzx.gov.cn

Chinese name
- Simplified Chinese: 中国人民政治协商会议河北省委员会
- Traditional Chinese: 中國人民政治協商會議河北省委員會
Transcriptions
Standard Mandarin
- Hanyu Pinyin: Zhōngguó Rénmín Zhèngzhì Xiéshāng Huìyì Héběishěng Wěiyuánhuì

Abbreviation
- Simplified Chinese: 河北省政协
- Traditional Chinese: 河北省政協
- Literal meaning: CPPCC Hebei Provincial Committee
Transcriptions
Standard Mandarin
- Hanyu Pinyin: Héběishěng Zhèngxié

The Hebei Provincial Committee of the Chinese People's Political Consultative Conference (Chinese: 中国人民政治协商会议河北省委员会) is the advisory body and a local organization of the Chinese People's Political Consultative Conference in Hebei, China. It is supervised and directed by the Hebei Provincial Committee of the Chinese Communist Party.

== History ==
The Hebei Provincial Committee of the Chinese People's Political Consultative Conference traces its origins to the Hebei Provincial People's Congress Consultative Committee (河北省各界人民代表会议协商委员会), founded in 1949.

== Term ==
=== 1st ===
- Term: January 1955 – February 1960
- Chairperson: Ma Guorui
- Vice Chairpersons: Yan Dakai, Wang Baozhen, Lü Fu, Liu Hongtao, Zhao Huilou, Li Xingzhong, Zhou Sicheng (April 1956 – ), Qi Biying (April 1956 – ), Wu Yunshan (April 1956 – ), Wang Naitang (April 1956 – ), Yang Yumin (December 1958 – ), Yang Shixian (December 1958 – ), Wang Xiaoyi (December 1958 – ), Liu Xiying (December 1958 – ), Jiang Zhanchun (December 1958 – ), He Zongqian (December 1958 – )
- Secretary-General: Zhou Ru

=== 2nd ===
- Term: February 1960 – October 1964
- Chairperson: Ma Guorui
- Vice Chairpersons: Yan Dakai, Li Ziguang, Yang Yizhou, Yang Yumin, Liu Qingyang, Yang Shixian, Wang Xiaoyi, Guo Fang, Zhou Sicheng (Died September 1964), Liu Xiying, Wu Yunshan, Wang Naitang, Qi Biying, Zhao Huilou, Li Xingzhong, Bai Zhiwen, Jiang Zhanchun, He Zongqian, Niu Shucai (December 1962 – ), Xu Zheng (December 1962 – )
- Secretary-General: Zhou Ru

=== 3rd ===
- Term: October 1964 – December 1977
- Chairperson: Yan Dakai
- Vice Chairpersons: Zhang Chengxian, Yang Yizhou, Yang Yumin, Liu Qingyang, Wang Xiaoyi, Du Xinbo, Meng Qingshan, Xu Zheng, Niu Shucai, Gao Yangyun, Liu Xiying, Wu Yunshan, Pan Chengxiao, Wang Naitang, Qi Biying, Bai Zhiwen, Jiang Zhanchun, He Zongqian
- Secretary-General: Ren Kefei

=== 4th ===
- Term: December 1977 – April 1983
- Chairperson: Liu Zihou (– February 1980) → Yin Zhe (February 1980 – )
- Vice Chairpersons: Zhang Chengxian, Pan Chengxiao, Geng Changsuo, Jiang Zhanchun, Bai Zhiwen, Yu Dafu, Zou Guohou, Sun Yueqi, Lu Zhiguo, Ma Zhuozhou, Gan Chunlei, Li Huasheng, Hu Yi, Luo Chengde, Shen Xili, Yu Lüqi, Niu Shucai (January 1979 – 1980), Li De (February 1980 – ), Pang Jun (February 1980 – ), Yin Yigang (February 1980 – ), Bai Yun (February 1980 – ), Lin Runtian (February 1980 – ), Duan Huixuan (February 1980 – ), Liang Bin (February 1980 – ), Song Zhiyi (February 1980 – ), Zhang Ruolin (February 1980 – ), Dai Jinong (October 1981 – ), Zhang Xiaodong
- Secretary-General: Zhang Shuming (– 1980) → Li Zishou (1980 – )

=== 5th ===
- Term: April 1983 – April 1988
- Chairperson: Yin Zhe
- Vice Chairpersons: Li Fanglin, Lu Zhiguo (– June 1985), Shen Xili, Zhang Ruolin, Jia Qiyun (– June 1985), Bai Tieshi, Xu Ruilin (– June 1985), Chen Lintang, Ma Zhuozhou, Li Ganlu, Wang Enduo, Yan Jingbo (– April 1987), Ma Xinyun, Liu Zongyao, Xu Chunxing (June 1985 – ), Du Jingyi (June 1985 – )
- Secretary-General: Shi Xizhi (– April 1986) → Wang Shusen (April 1986 – )

=== 6th ===
- Term: April 1988 – May 1993
- Chairperson: Li Wenshan
- Vice Chairpersons: Xu Chunxing, Du Jingyi, Wang Enduo, Ma Xinyun, Zhang Ruolin, Chen Lintang, Liu Zongyao, Wang Shusen, Huang Lan, Yu Zhenzhong, Wang Zuwu (April 1990 – ), Zhao Huichen (January 1992 – )
- Secretary-General: Wang Qin (– January 1992) → Li Wenzao (January 1992 – )

=== 7th ===
- Term: May 1993 – January 1998
- Chairperson: Li Wenshan
- Vice Chairpersons: Zhang Runshen, Wang Shusen, Huang Lan, Du Benjie, Zhao Huichen, Ma Xinyun, Yu Zhenzhong, Wang Manqiu, Chen Hui, Zhao Yan, Wang Youhui (February 1995 – ), Li Yuehui (February 1995 – )
- Secretary-General: Li Wenzao (May 1993 – January 1997) → Sun Jianqun (January 1997 – )

=== 8th ===
- Term: January 1998 – January 2003
- Chairperson: Lü Chuanzan
- Vice Chairpersons: Liu Ronghui, Han Licheng, Du Benjie, Wang Youhui, Guo Hongqi (– 2002), Chen Hui, Zhao Yan, Li Yuehui (– January 2002), Wu Zhenhua (– January 2002), Yang Guochun, Qi Xuchun, Wang Shichang, Zhao Jinduo (January 2001 – )
- Secretary-General: Sun Jianqun (– January 2000) → Zhang Yushu (January 2000 – )

=== 9th ===
- Term: January 2003 – January 2008
- Chairperson: Zhao Jinduo
- Vice Chairpersons: Zhao Yan (– February 2006), Yang Qian, Liu Jiansheng, Qin Chaozhen, Wang Jianzhong, Zhao Tielian, Liu Dezhong, Li Youcheng, Duan Huijun, Cong Bin, Feng Wenhai (March 2005 – ), Chen Xiufang (February 2006 – ), Kong Xiaojun (February 2006 – ), Wu Sihai (February 2006 – ), Liu Dewang (January 2007 – )
- Secretary-General: Xie Yuqi

=== 10th ===
- Term: January 2008 – January 2013
- Chairperson: Liu Dewang (– January 2012) → Fu Zhifang (January 2012 – )
- Vice Chairpersons: Gao Xitong (– January 15, 2011), Zhao Wenhe, Wang Yumei, Tian Xiangli (– January 9, 2012), Duan Huijun, Cong Bin, Kong Xiaojun, Wu Sihai, Wang Gang, Cui Jiangshui (January 15, 2011 – ), Liu Yongrui (January 9, 2012 – )
- Secretary-General: An Yunfang

=== 11th ===
- Term: January 2013 – January 2018
- Chairperson: Fu Zhifang
- Vice Chairpersons: Liu Yongrui (– January 2017), Ai Wenli (January 11, 2015 – ), Sun Ruibin (January 11, 2017 – ), Duan Huijun, Cui Jiangshui (– January 2017), Xu Ning (January 11, 2017 – ), Jiang Deguo (January 11, 2017 – ), Guo Hua, Cao Suhua, Ge Huibo, Lu Xiaoguang, Bian Faji (January 11, 2015 – )
- Secretary-General: Guo Dajian

=== 12th ===
- Term: January 2018 – January 2023
- Chairperson: Ye Dongsong
- Vice Chairpersons: Shen Xiaoping (– February 21, 2021), Sun Ruibin, Cao Suhua (– February 21, 2021), Ge Huibo, Lu Xiaoguang, Bian Faji, Su Yinzeng, Wang Baoshan, Liang Tiangang (January 10, 2020 – ), Xu Jianpei (February 21, 2021 – ), Chang Lihong (February 21, 2021 – ), Ran Wanxiang (January 19, 2022 – ), Gao Zhili (January 19, 2022 – ), Zhang Gujiang (January 19, 2022 – )
- Secretary-General: Chen Shuzeng

=== 13th ===
- Term: January 2023 – 2028
- Chairperson: Lian Yimin (– January 2024) → Zhang Guohua (January 2024 – )
- Vice Chairpersons: Ran Wanxiang, Ge Huibo, Gao Zhili, Zhang Gujiang, Wang Baoshan, Chang Lihong, Kang Yanmin, Zhang Fucheng, He Bingqun
- Secretary-General: Chen Shuzeng
