= List of ambassadors of China to Samoa =

Coordinates: 1.954102°S 30.061487°E

Ambassador of China to Samoa
- Incumbent; Wang Xuefeng since 1 September 2015
- Inaugural holder: Sampson Shen
- Formation: 9 May 1972; 54 years ago

The ambassador of China to Samoa is the official representative of the People's Republic of China to the Independent State of Samoa.

== List of representatives ==
Diplomatic agrément/diplomatic accreditation	Ambassador	Chinese language zh:中国驻萨摩亚大使列表	Observations	Premier of the People's Republic of China	Prime Minister of Samoa	Term end
May 29, 1972			The governments in Apia and Taipei established diplomatic relations.	Chiang Ching-kuo	Tupua Tamasese Lealofi IV	
May 9, 1972	Sampson Shen	zh:沈锜	With residence in Canberra and accreditation in Nukuʻalofa	Chiang Ching-kuo	Tupua Tamasese Lealofi IV	November 6, 1975
November 6, 1975			The governments in Apia and Beijing established diplomatic relations.	Zhou Enlai	Tupua Tamasese Lealofi IV	
October 1, 1978	Zhang Zhanwu	张占武		Hua Guofeng	Tufuga Efi	June 1, 1979
February 1, 1981	Wang Hao	王浩		Zhao Ziyang	Tufuga Efi	August 1, 1982
April 1, 1983	Gu Ji	顾亟		Zhao Ziyang	Tofilau Eti Alesana	July 1, 1986
September 1, 1986	Sun Dagang	孙大纲		Zhao Ziyang	Va'ai Kolone	August 1, 1990
September 1, 1990	Yue Junqing	zh:乐俊清	From February to April 1990 he was Ambassador to Lesotho	Li Peng	Tofilau Eti Alesana	February 1, 1994
February 1, 1994	Wang Nongsheng	王弄笙		Li Peng	Tofilau Eti Alesana	July 1, 1997
August 1, 1997	Wang Xinyuan	王新元		Li Peng	Tofilau Eti Alesana	February 1, 2002
March 25, 2002	Gu Sicong	顾思聪		Zhu Rongji	Tuilaepa Aiono Sailele Malielegaoi	June 1, 2004
June 11, 2004	Liu Guanren	刘关仁		Wen Jiabao	Tuilaepa Aiono Sailele Malielegaoi	April 1, 2006
July 3, 2006	Shi Longzhuang	施隆壮		Wen Jiabao	Tuilaepa Aiono Sailele Malielegaoi	July 1, 2008
August 19, 2008	Ma Chongren	馬崇仁		Wen Jiabao	Tuilaepa Aiono Sailele Malielegaoi	February 1, 2011
March 1, 2011	Zhao Weiping	赵卫平		Wen Jiabao	Tuilaepa Aiono Sailele Malielegaoi	January 1, 2013
January 1, 2013	Li Yanduan	李燕瑞		Li Keqiang	Tuilaepa Aiono Sailele Malielegaoi	August 31, 2015
September 1, 2015	Wang Xuefeng	王雪峰		Li Keqiang	Tuilaepa Aiono Sailele Malielegaoi	

== See also ==
- China–Samoa relations
