= List of ambassadors of China to Botswana =

The ambassador of China to Botswana is the official representative of the People's Republic of China to Botswana.

== List of representatives ==
=== Republic of China ===
Name (English)	Name (Chinese)	Tenure begins	Tenure ends	Note
Pu Dejie	濮德玠	10 April 1967	9 June 1970	
Liu Xinyu	刘新玉	2 May 1970	5 April 1974	

=== People's Republic of China ===
Name (English)	Name (Chinese)	Tenure begins	Tenure ends	Note
Gao E	高锷	April 1975	25 August 1975	Chargé d'affaires
Zhao Zhengyi	赵政一	August 1975	June 1980	
Wang Rensan	王人三	May 1981	27 July 1983	
Lu Defang	路德芳	August 1983	19 February 1986	
Zhang Dezheng	张德政	March 1986	April 1990	
Shi Chengxun	施承训	June 1990	February 1993	
Wang Yihao	王义浩	April 1993	March 1996	
Zhang Shihua	张世华	April 1996	August 1998	
Bao Shusheng	鲍树生	September 1998	November 2002	
Lin Difu	林迪夫	December 2002	December 2004	
Jiang Zhengyun	蒋正云	December 2004	March 2007	
Ding Xiaowen	丁孝文	March 2007	February 2009	
Liu Huanxing	刘焕兴	April 2009	March 2013	
Zheng Zhuqiang	郑竹强	April 2013	October 2016	
Zhao Yanbo	赵彦博	November 2016	February 2021	
Wang Xuefeng (born 1966)	王雪峰	April 2021		

== See also ==
- Botswana–China relations
