= Ai Wenli =

Chinese politician

- 艾文礼

Vice Chairman of the Hebei Provincial Committee of the Chinese People's Political Consultative Conference
- In office January 2015 – January 2018
- Chairman: Ye Dongsong

Head of Publicity Department of Hebei Provincial Committee of the Chinese Communist Party
- In office December 2011 – September 2015
- Preceded by: Nie Chenxi
- Succeeded by: Tian Xiangli

Mayor of Shijiazhuang
- In office September 2008 – December 2011
- Preceded by: Ji Chuntang
- Succeeded by: Jiang Deguo

Communist Party Secretary of Chengde
- In office January 2008 – September 2008
- Preceded by: Zhao Wenhe
- Succeeded by: Yang Rui

Mayor of Chengde
- In office July 2006 – January 2008
- Preceded by: Jing Chunhua
- Succeeded by: Zhang Gujiang

Personal details
- Born: March 1955 (age 71) Tanghai County, Hebei
- Party: Chinese Communist Party (1978-2018, expelled)
- Education: Tangshan Regional Business School

Chinese name
- Traditional Chinese: 艾文禮
- Simplified Chinese: 艾文礼
Transcriptions
Standard Mandarin
- Hanyu Pinyin: Ài Wénlǐ

Ai Wenli (Chinese: 艾文礼; born March 1955) is a former Chinese politician who served as the vice-chairman of the Hebei Provincial Committee of the Chinese People's Political Consultative Conference. Previously, he served as the head of the Publicity Department of the Chinese Communist Party Hebei Committee and the Mayor of Shijiazhuang. He was placed under investigation by the Central Commission for Discipline Inspection and the National Supervisory Commission shortly after his retirement. Ai is the first leader of vice-ministerial level to spontaneously hand himself in to the anti-corruption agency of China after the implementation of Supervision Law in March 2018.

== Career ==
Ai was born in March 1955, and graduated from Tangshan Regional Business School (唐山地区商业学校). In 1971 he became a worker on a farm. Later he served as the County Head of Tanghai County, the Head of the Publicity Department of the CCP Tangshan Committee, the director Bureau of Land Reclamation of Hebei, the Deputy Secretary and Head of the Organization Department of the CPC Shijiazhuang Committee, the Mayor of Chengde, and the Secretary of the CPC Chengde Committee.

During the Sanlu scandal in 2008, Ai was appointed as the Party Deputy Secretary and the Mayor of Shijiazhuang. In 2011, he was appointed as the Head of the Publicity Department of the CPC Hebei Committee, until September 2015. He was appointed as the vice-chairman of the Hebei Provincial Committee of the Chinese People's Political Consultative Conference in 2015, and he retired in January 2018. In July 2018, Ai turned himself in to the Central Commission for Discipline Inspection and the State Supervisory Commission.

== Investigation ==
On July 31, 2018, Ai Wenli was placed under investigation by the Central Commission for Discipline Inspection, the party's internal disciplinary body, and the National Supervisory Commission, the highest anti-corruption agency of the People's Republic of China, for "serious violations of regulations and laws". According to the report, he turned himself in. He was expelled from the Communist Party on October 19. On December 27, his trial was held at the Intermediate People's Court of Suzhou. He was accused of abusing his powers in former positions he held between 2005 and 2013 in Hebei to seek benefits for certain organizations and individuals in the matters of enterprise restructuring, project development and work arrangement. In return, he accepted money and property worth more than 64.78 million yuan ($10 million) either directly or from other connections.

On April 18, 2019, Ai was sentenced to 8 years in prison for bribery in Suzhou, Jiangsu. He was also fined 3 million yuan ($44.7 million).

Government offices
| Preceded by Hu Jincheng | Director of Hebei Agricultural Reclamation Bureau; 1998-2003 | Succeeded by Sun Rongdi |
| Preceded by Jing Chunhua | Mayor of Chengde; 2006-2008 | Succeeded by Zhang Gujiang |
| Preceded by Ji Chuntang | Mayor of Shijiazhuang; 2008-2011 | Succeeded by Jiang Deguo |
Party political offices
| Preceded by Nie Chenxi | Head of Publicity Department of Hebei Provincial Committee of the Chinese Communist Party; 2011-2015 | Succeeded by Tian Xiangli |
| Preceded by Zhao Wenhe | Communist Party Secretary of Chengde; 2008-2008 | Succeeded by Yang Rui |
