= Chen Gang (politician, born 1965) =

Chinese politician (born 1965)

- 陈刚
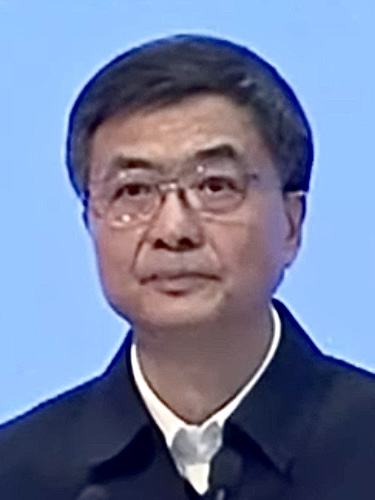
- Chen in 2025

Party Secretary of Guangxi
- Incumbent
- Assumed office 31 December 2024
- Deputy: Lan Tianli; Wei Tao (Chairman)
- Preceded by: Liu Ning

Chairperson of Qinghai Provincial People's Congress
- In office 19 January 2023 – 2025
- Preceded by: Xin Changxing
- Succeeded by: Wu Xiaojun

Party Secretary of Qinghai
- In office 3 January 2023 – 31 December 2024
- Deputy: Wu Xiaojun (Governor)
- Preceded by: Xin Changxing
- Succeeded by: Wu Xiaojun

Personal details
- Born: April 1965 (age 61) Gaoyou, Jiangsu, China
- Party: Chinese Communist Party
- Education: Yangzhou University; Harbin Institute of Technology; Peking University

Chinese name
- Simplified Chinese: 陈刚
- Traditional Chinese: 陳剛
Transcriptions
Standard Mandarin
- Hanyu Pinyin: Chén Gāng

Chen Gang (Chinese: 陈刚; born April 1965) is a Chinese politician, currently serving as Party Secretary of Guangxi. Previously he served as Chairperson of Qinghai Provincial People's Congress and Party Secretary of Qinghai. He also served as Party Secretary of the All-China Federation of Trade Unions. He spent much of his career in Beijing, before being transferred to Guizhou as party chief of Guiyang. He then served as Party Secretary of the Xiong'an New Area and Vice Governor of Hebei, and a member of the Hebei provincial party standing committee.

== Biography ==
Chen was born in Gaoyou, Jiangsu province, near Yangzhou. He attended Yangzhou Normal College (now Yangzhou University) between 1980 and 1984, where he studied chemistry. He then attended graduate school at Harbin Institute of Technology, majoring in applied chemistry and polymer materials. He joined the Chinese Communist Party in 1986. In 1987, he began studying for his doctorate degree in inorganic chemistry at Peking University. Beginning in 1990, he worked at the Beijing Glass Research Institute. In July 1994, he was promoted to deputy director of the research institute, and vice president at Beijing Yiqing Group. In July 2000, he became the deputy head of the commission on foreign trade and commerce of Beijing. In 2003, he took on his first political office, becoming deputy party chief of Chaoyang District, then district governor (confirmed in January 2004).

In October 2006, he was named party chief of Chaoyang District; in July 2012 he was named to the Beijing Party Standing Committee, along with, by coincidence, another person with an identical name, who was vice mayor. To disambiguate the two at routine meetings, Chen Gang (1966) was known as "Chen Gang (government)", and Chen Gang (1965) was known as "Chen Gang (Chaoyang District)". In June 2013 he was transferred to Guizhou to serve on the provincial standing committee, and then he was named party chief of the provincial capital Guiyang in 2013. In Guiyang, Chen was known for experimenting with policies that aimed to transform Guiyang and its surrounding areas from an agrarian backwater to a cloud computing hub.

In 2017, Chen was appointed Party Secretary of the Xiong'an New Area, a vast area of development assigned by the state to supplement the growth of the Beijing metropolitan region. He was also made Vice Governor and concurrently a member of the Hebei provincial party standing committee.

Chen was First Secretary of the Secretariat of the All-China Federation of Trade Unions in February 2021, in addition to serving as vice president.

Chen was made Party Secretary of Qinghai in January 2023, concurrently serving as Chairperson of Qinghai Provincial People's Congress.

On 31 December 2024, chen was chosen as Party Secretary of Guangxi, replacing Liu Ning.

Government offices
Preceded by Li Shixiang	Governor of Chaoyang District; 2003–2006	Succeeded by Cheng Lianyuan
New title	Director of the Management Committee of Xiong'an New Area; 2017–2020	Succeeded by Zhang Guohua (politician, born 1964)
Party political offices
Preceded by Li Shixiang	Party Secretary of Chaoyang District; 2006–2012	Succeeded by Cheng Lianyuan
Preceded by Li Jun	Party Secretary of Guiyang; 2013–2017	Succeeded by Li Zaiyong
Preceded by Yuan Tongli	Secretary of the Xiong'an New Area Committee of the Chinese Communist Party; 2017	Succeeded by Zhang Guohua (politician, born 1964)
Preceded by Zhao Yide	Specifically-designated Deputy Party Secretary of Hebei; 2020	Succeeded by Lian Yimin
Preceded by Xin Changxing	Party Secretary of Qinghai; 2023–2024	Succeeded by Wu Xiaojun
Preceded by Liu Ning	Party Secretary of Guangxi; 2024–present	Incumbent
Civic offices
Preceded by Li Yufu	First Secretary of the Secretariat of the All-China Federation of Trade Unions; 2021–2023	Succeeded by Xu Liuping
Assembly seats
Preceded by Xin Changxing	Chairperson of Qinghai Provincial People's Congress; 2023–2025	Succeeded by Wu Xiaojun
