= Wang Xuefeng (politician, born 1954) =

Chinese politician (born 1954)

- 王雪峰

Vice Chairman of Hebei Provincial People's Congress
- In office January 2013 – January 2018
- Chairman: Zhao Kezhi

Personal details
- Born: December 1954 (age 71) Yongnian County, Hebei, China
- Party: Chinese Communist Party (expelled; 1973–2023)
- Education: North China University of Science and Technology

Wang Xuefeng (Chinese: 王雪峰; pinyin: Wáng Xuěfēng; born December 1954) is a former Chinese politician who spent his entire career in north China's Hebei province. He was investigated by China's top anti-graft agency in January 2023. Previously he served as vice chairman of Hebei Provincial People's Congress from 2013 to 2018.

== Early life and education ==
Wang was born in Yongnian County (now Yongnian District of Handan), Hebei, in December 1954. He was a worker at Matou Iron Smelting Plant in Handan from January 1971 to September 1974 during the late Cultural Revolution. He joined the Chinese Communist Party (CCP) in March 1973. In September 1974, he entered Hebei Institute of Mining and Metallurgy (now North China University of Science and Technology), where he majored in iron-smelting.

== Political career ==
After graduating in 1977, he continued to work at Matou Iron Smelting Plant as an official.

Wang became an official in the CCP Yongnian County Committee in April 1979, and eventually becoming its deputy party secretary in June 1987.

He was deputy party secretary of Guantao County in December 1992, in addition to serving as magistrate.

He was party secretary of Handan County in January 1998, and held that office until August 2001.

Wang joined the Hebei Provincial Commission for Discipline Inspection in August 2001, where he was promoted to secretary-general in January 2002 and deputy secretary in January 2004. He also served as director of the Hebei Provincial Supervisory Commission between January 2007 and August 2010.

He was chosen as party secretary of Tangshan in August 2010, concurrently serving as vice chairman of Hebei Provincial People's Congress since January 2013.

== Downfall ==
On 6 January 2023, Wang was put under investigation for alleged "serious violations of discipline and laws" by the Central Commission for Discipline Inspection (CCDI), the party's internal disciplinary body, and the National Supervisory Commission, the highest anti-corruption agency of China. On July 6, he was expelled from the CCP and dismissed from public office.

On 31 May 2024, Wang stood trial at the Intermediate People's Court of Taiyuan on charges of taking bribes. Prosecutors accused Wang of taking advantage of his different positions from 1999 to 2022 and abusing his power to seek profits for others and accepting bribes in exchange, receiving illegal gains totaling over 84 million yuan ($11.6 million), and even after retiring, Wang continued using his influence to illicitly benefit from dealings in cases and project contracts, accumulating over 4.11 million yuan in illegal gains. On October 16, he was sentenced to 18 years in prison by the Taiyuan Intermediate People's Court after being convicted of accepting more than 88 million yuan ($12.37 million) in bribery and using his influence to acquire bribes.

Government offices
Preceded by Li Junshan (李俊山)	Director of the Hebei Provincial Supervisory Commission; 2007–2011	Succeeded by Ma Yuchan (马玉蝉)
Party political offices
Preceded by Zhao Yong	Communist Party Secretary of Tangshan; 2010–2013	Succeeded by Jiang Deguo
