= Suzhou University of Technology =

Public university in Changshu, Jiangsu, China

- 苏州工学院
- Former name: Changshu Institute of Technology
- Motto: 立本求真、日新致远
- Motto in English: "Integrity, Verity, Strive and Thrive"
- Type: Public
- Established: 1958; 68 years ago
- President: Jiang Jianming
- Total staff: c. 1,600
- Undergraduates: c. 20,000
- Postgraduates: c. 100
- Location: Changshu, Jiangsu, China
- Campus: 300 acres (120 ha); multiple sites
- Website: en.szut.edu.cn

The Suzhou University of Technology (SZUT; Chinese: 苏州工学院; pinyin: sūzhōu gōngxuéyuàn), formerly Changshu Institute of Technology, is a provincial public college focused on technology and teacher education. It is located in the center of the Yangtze Delta, in Changshu, a satellite city of Suzhou, Jiangsu, China (Chinese: 沙家浜). (Chinese: 东湖校区) They opened in 2004.

== History ==
The Changshu Institute of Technology was established in August 1958 and was originally known as Suzhou Normal Vocational College.

In February 2025, the institute was approved a name change to Suzhou University of Technology.

== Departments ==
=== Sites ===
In addition, CIT established many construction sites.

Site	Number
National College Characteristic Specialized Construction	1
Provincial Excellent Subject Echelon	1
Provincial Excellent Teaching Team	1
Provincial Personnel Training Pattern Experiment Base of Higher Education	1
Provincial Engineering Center	1
Provincial Key Laboratory	1
Provincial Construction Site of Experimental Teaching Demonstration	4
Provincial Brand and Characteristic Specialized Construction	6
Provincial Key Disciplines	2

Teaching buildings

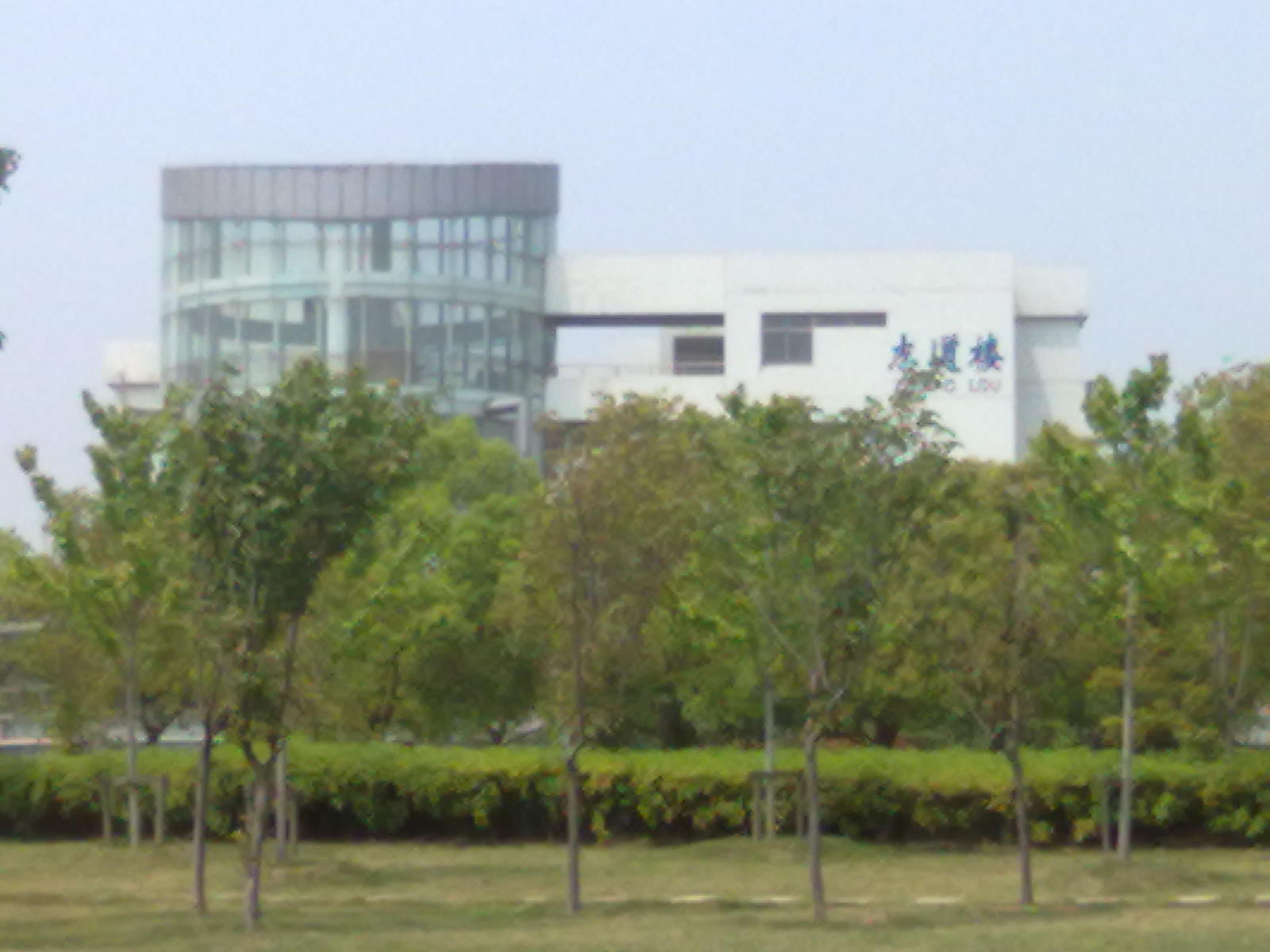
Zhi Dao building

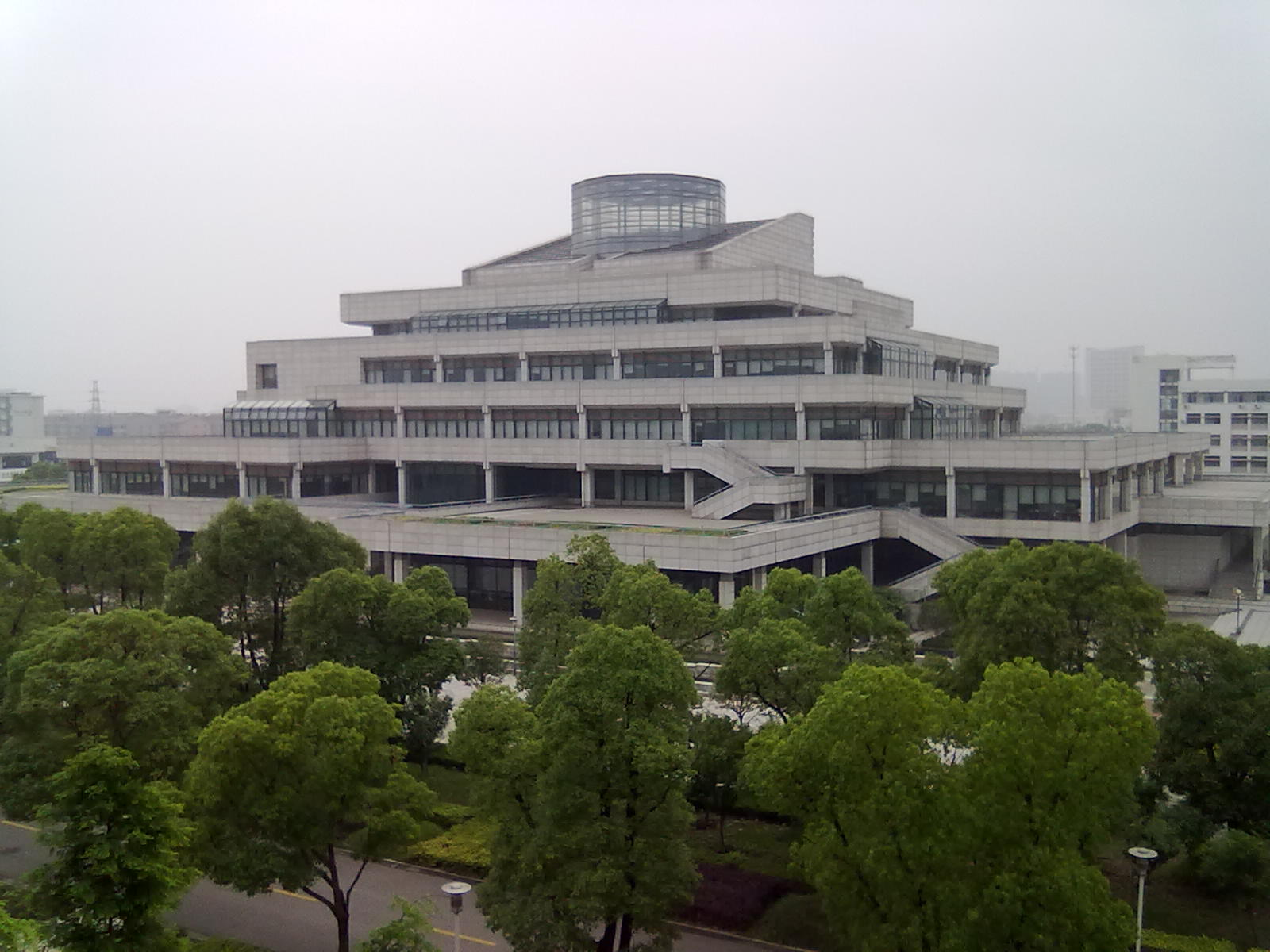
Library

.

Academic Exchange Center

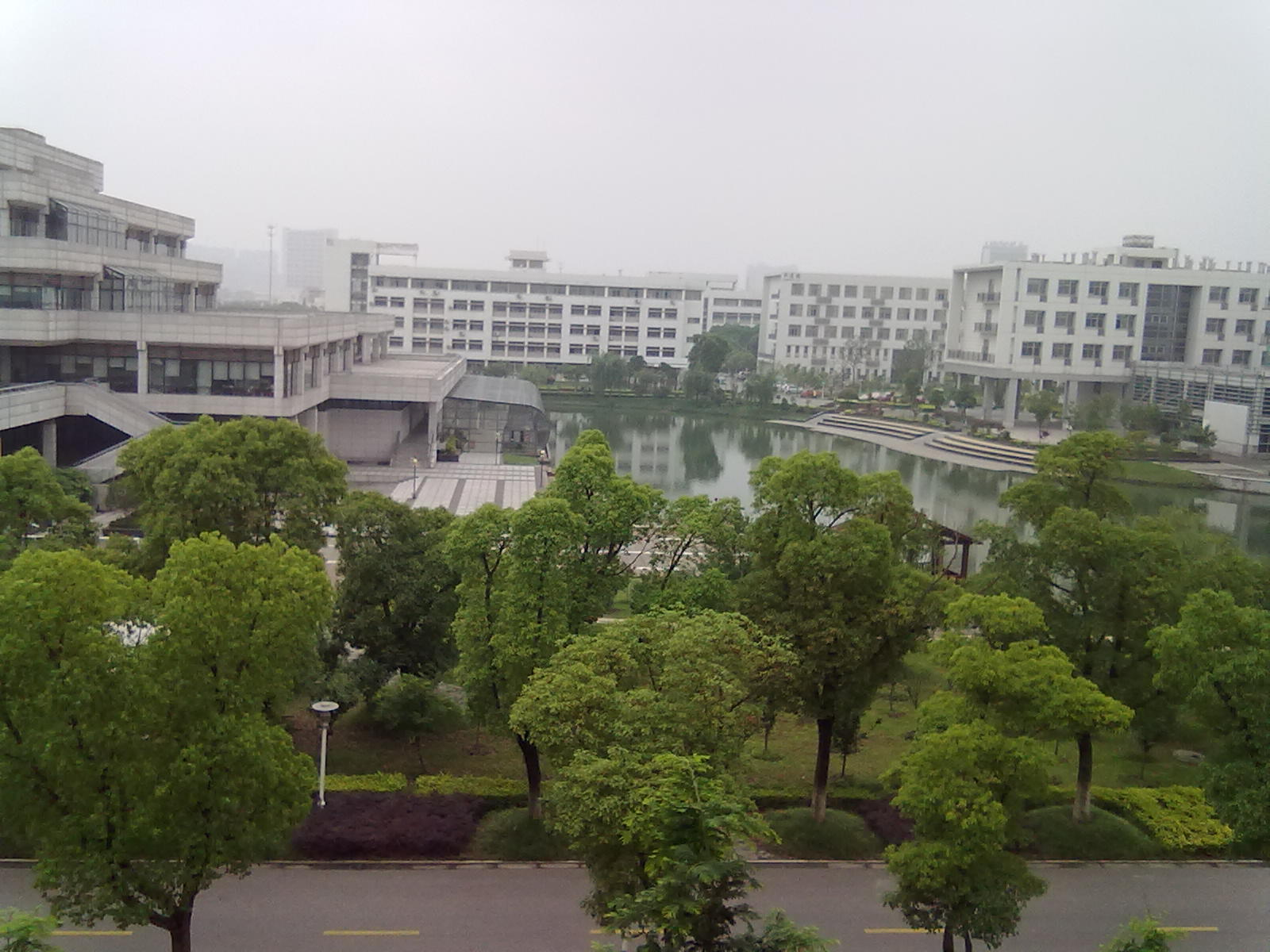
Environment
