= Lian Yimin =

Chinese politician

- 廉毅敏

Chairman of the Zhejiang Provincial Committee of the Chinese People's Political Consultative Conference
- Incumbent
- Assumed office January 2024
- Preceded by: Huang Lixin

Personal details
- Born: March 5, 1964 (age 62) Pingyao County, Shanxi, China
- Party: Chinese Communist Party
- Education: Tsinghua University; Shanxi University

Lian Yimin (Chinese: 廉毅敏; pinyin: Lián Yìmǐn; born 5 March 1964) is a Chinese politician currently serving as chairman of the Zhejiang Provincial Committee of the Chinese People's Political Consultative Conference, in office since January 2014. Previously he served as chairman of the Hebei Provincial Committee of the Chinese People's Political Consultative Conference.

He was a representative of the 19th National Congress of the Chinese Communist Party and is a representative of the 20th National Congress of the Chinese Communist Party. He was a delegate to the 12th National People's Congress. He was a member of the 14th National Committee of the Chinese People's Political Consultative Conference and is a member of the 14th National Committee of the Chinese People's Political Consultative Conference.

== Early life and education ==
Lian was born in Pingyao County, Shanxi, on 5 March 1964. In 1981, he enrolled at Tsinghua University, where he majored in optical instrument. After university in 1986, he did his postgraduate work at Shanxi University. Upon graduation, he stayed for teaching, and eventually became deputy director of the Institute of Optoelectronics in September 1991.

== Career ==
=== Shanxi ===
He joined the Chinese Communist Party (CCP) in July 1984, and got involved in politics in February 1992, when he worked in the Office of the Shanxi Provincial People's Government. He was manager of Shanxi Provincial Transportation Information and Communication Company in September 1993 and subsequently director of Shanxi Provincial Transportation Computer Communication Center in December 1996. In October 2000, he became deputy director of Shanxi Provincial Science and Technology Department, rising to director in September 2006. In February 2011, he was named acting mayor of the capital city Taiyuan, confirmed in the following month. He also served as deputy party secretary and member of the CCP Taiyuan Municipal Committee, the city's top authority. In March 2013, he became secretary-general of Shanxi Provincial People's Government, and then head of the United Front Work Department of the CCP Shanxi Provincial Committee in November 2016. After a brief term, he was appointed head of the Publicity Department of the CCP Shanxi Provincial Committee in March 2018. In June 2019, he was made secretary-general of the CCP Shanxi Provincial Committee and was admitted to member of the CCP Shanxi Provincial Committee, the province's top authority.

=== Hebei ===
In October 2020, he was appointed head of the Organization Department of the CCP Hebei Provincial Committee and was admitted to member of the CCP Hebei Provincial Committee, the province's top authority. He was chosen as specifically designated deputy party secretary in September 2021, concurrently serving as secretary-general. On 14 January 2023, he became chairman of the Hebei Provincial Committee of the Chinese People's Political Consultative Conference, the provincial advisory body.

=== Zhejiang ===
He was transferred to the coastal province Zhejiang in December 2023 and appointed chairman of the Zhejiang Provincial Committee of the Chinese People's Political Consultative Conference in January 2024.

Government offices
Preceded by Wen Zexian	Director of Shanxi Provincial Science and Technology Department; 2006–2011	Succeeded by He Tiancai
Preceded by Zhang Bingsheng	Mayor of Taiyuan; 2011–2013	Succeeded by Geng Yanbo
Preceded by Chen Yongqi	Secretary-General of Shanxi Provincial People's Government; 2013–2016	Succeeded by Wang Chun
Party political offices
Preceded by Sun Shaocheng	Head of the United Front Work Department of the Shanxi Provincial Committee of the Chinese Communist Party; 2016–2018	Succeeded by Xu Guangguo
Preceded by Wang Qingxian	Head of the Publicity Department of Shanxi Provincial Committee of the Chinese Communist Party; 2018–2019	Succeeded by Lü Yansong
Preceded by Hu Yuting	Secretary-General of the Shanxi Provincial Committee of the Chinese Communist Party; 2019–2020	Succeeded by Li Fengqi
Preceded by Liang Tiangeng	Head of the Organization Department of Hebei Provincial Committee of the Chinese Communist Party; 2020–2021	Succeeded by Ke Jun
Preceded by Dong Xiaoyu	Secretary-General of the Hebei Provincial Committee of the Chinese Communist Party; 2022–2023	Succeeded by Yan Pengcheng
Preceded by Chen Gang	Specifically-designated Deputy Communist Party Secretary of Hebei; 2021–2023	Succeeded by TBA
Assembly seats
Preceded by Ye Dongsong	Chairman of the Hebei Provincial Committee of the Chinese People's Political Consultative Conference; 2023–2024	Succeeded by Zhang Guohua
Preceded by Huang Lixin	Chairman of the Zhejiang Provincial Committee of the Chinese People's Political Consultative Conference; 2024–present	Incumbent
