= Wang Xuefeng (diplomat) =

Chinese diplomat

- 王雪峰

Chinese Ambassador to Denmark
- Incumbent
- Assumed office 5 July 2024
- Preceded by: Feng Tie

Chinese Ambassador to Botswana
- In office April 2021 – April 2024
- Preceded by: Zhao Yanbo

Chinese Ambassador to Samoa
- In office 30 September 2015 – 8 May 2019
- Preceded by: Li Yanduan
- Succeeded by: Chao Xiaoliang

Personal details
- Born: April 1966 (age 60) Jianhu County, Jiangsu, China
- Party: Chinese Communist Party
- Education: Nanjing University

Wang Xuefeng (born April 1966) is a Chinese diplomat and politician. He is the Chinese ambassador to Denmark, and the former Chinese ambassador to Botswana and Chinese ambassador to Samoa.

== Early life and career ==
Wang was born in Jianhu County, Jiangsu, China, in April 1966. He obtained a bachelor of arts degree from Nanjing University. In 1988, he joined the Ministry of Foreign Affairs of the People's Republic of China. Between 2011 and 2013, he was the minister at the Embassy of China in India. He was the Consulate-General of China in Kolkata for two years (2013–2015).

Prior to his appointment as the Chinese Ambassador to Botswana, he was the Special Envoy for the China-Pacific Islands Forum Dialogue.

On 5 July 2024, he was appointed as the Chinese ambassador to Denmark.

Diplomatic posts
Preceded by Zhang Lizhong	Chinese Consul General in Kolkata; 2013–2015	Succeeded by Ma Zhanwu
Preceded by Li Yanduan	Chinese Ambassador to Samoa; 2015–2019	Succeeded by Chao Xiaoliang
Preceded by Zhao Yanbo	Chinese Ambassador to Botswana; 2021–2024	Succeeded by TBA
Preceded by Feng Tie	Chinese Ambassador to Denmark; 2024–	Incumbent
