= Chongyang County =

Chongyang County 崇阳县
- County
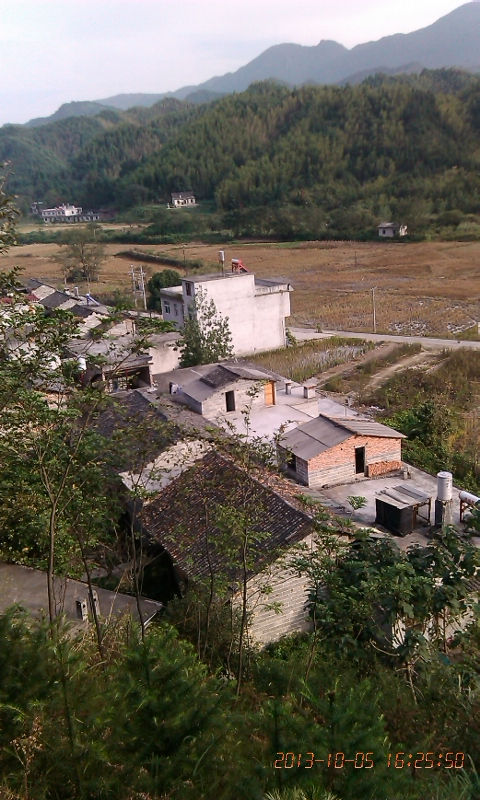

- Location of the seat in Hubei
- Coordinates: 29.556°N 114.040°E
- Country: People's Republic of China
- Province: Hubei
- Prefecture-level city: Xianning

Area
  - Total: 1,968 km^{2} (760 sq mi)

Population (2020 census)
  - Total: 427,130
  - Density: 217.0/km^{2} (562.1/sq mi)
- Time zone: UTC+8 (China Standard)
- Website: www.chongyang.gov.cn

Chongyang County (simplified Chinese: 崇阳县; traditional Chinese: 崇陽縣; pinyin: Chóngyáng Xiàn) is a county of southeastern Hubei province, People's Republic of China, bordering Hunan province to the west and Jiangxi province to the southeast. It is under the administration of Xianning City.

== Administrative divisions ==
Eight towns:

- Tiancheng (天城镇), Shaping (沙坪镇), Shicheng (石城镇), Guihuaquan (桂花泉镇), Baini (白霓镇), Lukou (路口镇), Jintang (金塘镇), Qingshan (青山镇)

Four townships:

- Xiaoling Township (肖岭乡), Tongzhong Township (铜钟乡), Gangkou Township (港口乡), Gaojian Township (高枧乡)

One other area:

- Chongyang County Industrial Park District (崇阳县工业园区)

== Climate ==
Climate data for Chongyang, elevation 79 m (259 ft), (1991–2020 normals, extremes 1981–present)
Month	Jan	Feb	Mar	Apr	May	Jun	Jul	Aug	Sep	Oct	Nov	Dec	Year
Record high °C (°F)	23.9 (75.0)	29.4 (84.9)	34.7 (94.5)	35.7 (96.3)	36.6 (97.9)	38.4 (101.1)	40.2 (104.4)	40.8 (105.4)	39.2 (102.6)	37.7 (99.9)	32.1 (89.8)	24.4 (75.9)	40.8 (105.4)
Mean daily maximum °C (°F)	9.3 (48.7)	12.5 (54.5)	16.9 (62.4)	23.5 (74.3)	27.9 (82.2)	30.7 (87.3)	33.9 (93.0)	33.5 (92.3)	29.6 (85.3)	24.3 (75.7)	18.3 (64.9)	12.2 (54.0)	22.7 (72.9)
Daily mean °C (°F)	5.1 (41.2)	7.8 (46.0)	11.9 (53.4)	18.0 (64.4)	22.7 (72.9)	26.1 (79.0)	29.2 (84.6)	28.5 (83.3)	24.6 (76.3)	19.0 (66.2)	12.9 (55.2)	7.2 (45.0)	17.8 (64.0)
Mean daily minimum °C (°F)	2.0 (35.6)	4.4 (39.9)	8.2 (46.8)	13.9 (57.0)	18.8 (65.8)	22.7 (72.9)	25.6 (78.1)	25.0 (77.0)	20.9 (69.6)	15.1 (59.2)	9.0 (48.2)	3.7 (38.7)	14.1 (57.4)
Record low °C (°F)	−6.0 (21.2)	−6.2 (20.8)	−2.9 (26.8)	1.9 (35.4)	9.3 (48.7)	13.3 (55.9)	18.9 (66.0)	17.6 (63.7)	10.2 (50.4)	2.2 (36.0)	−2.0 (28.4)	−10.1 (13.8)	−10.1 (13.8)
Average precipitation mm (inches)	69.6 (2.74)	87.0 (3.43)	135.9 (5.35)	194.2 (7.65)	223.9 (8.81)	269.7 (10.62)	237.8 (9.36)	142.8 (5.62)	70.0 (2.76)	67.9 (2.67)	77.6 (3.06)	44.8 (1.76)	1,621.2 (63.83)
Average precipitation days (≥ 0.1 mm)	12.4	12.5	15.6	14.4	14.0	14.4	13.1	11.5	8.4	9.3	9.6	9.3	144.5
Average snowy days	4.2	1.9	0.5	0	0	0	0	0	0	0	0.2	1.3	8.1
Average relative humidity (%)	76	75	75	74	75	78	75	76	74	73	75	73	75
Mean monthly sunshine hours	75.4	80.3	98.7	123.8	138.5	135.2	196.9	190.1	151.9	135.9	114.3	106.3	1,547.3
Percentage possible sunshine	23	25	26	32	33	32	46	47	41	39	36	34	35
Source: China Meteorological Administration all-time October record

Climate data for Jinsha Station, Chongyang, elevation 751 m (2,464 ft), (1991–2020 normals)
Month	Jan	Feb	Mar	Apr	May	Jun	Jul	Aug	Sep	Oct	Nov	Dec	Year
Mean daily maximum °C (°F)	5.0 (41.0)	8.0 (46.4)	13.5 (56.3)	19.0 (66.2)	23.0 (73.4)	25.4 (77.7)	28.4 (83.1)	28.5 (83.3)	24.2 (75.6)	19.4 (66.9)	13.7 (56.7)	7.7 (45.9)	18.0 (64.4)
Daily mean °C (°F)	1.6 (34.9)	4.2 (39.6)	9.2 (48.6)	14.5 (58.1)	18.9 (66.0)	21.8 (71.2)	24.8 (76.6)	24.5 (76.1)	20.2 (68.4)	15.4 (59.7)	9.8 (49.6)	4.0 (39.2)	14.1 (57.3)
Mean daily minimum °C (°F)	−0.7 (30.7)	1.7 (35.1)	6.3 (43.3)	11.3 (52.3)	16.0 (60.8)	19.2 (66.6)	22.3 (72.1)	21.9 (71.4)	17.7 (63.9)	12.7 (54.9)	7.1 (44.8)	1.4 (34.5)	11.4 (52.5)
Average precipitation mm (inches)	59.3 (2.33)	97.8 (3.85)	171.9 (6.77)	218.6 (8.61)	228.8 (9.01)	304.7 (12.00)	253.8 (9.99)	190.9 (7.52)	128.8 (5.07)	102.9 (4.05)	94.0 (3.70)	51.1 (2.01)	1,902.6 (74.91)
Average precipitation days (≥ 0.1 mm)	13.2	14.9	16.6	15.5	16.1	17.4	14.1	14.7	12.9	12.8	13.1	10.1	171.4
Average relative humidity (%)	76	79	76	75	79	86	84	84	84	76	74	69	79
Source: China Meteorological Administration
