= Liu Zhihua =

Chinese politician (born 1949)

Liu Zhihua (Chinese: 刘志华; born 1949) is a former vice-mayor of Beijing. He was dismissed in 2006, and received a suspended death sentence for taking bribes of over six million yuan (valued at the time at over US$1 million) in October 2008.
