= Wu Xiaojun =

Chinese politician (born 1966)

- 吴晓军

Party Secretary of Gansu
- Incumbent
- Assumed office 22 September 2026
- Deputy: Kong Shaoxun (Governor)
- Preceded by: Hu Changsheng

Party Secretary of Qinghai
- In office 31 December 2024 – 22 September 2026
- Deputy: Luo Dongchuan (Governor)
- Preceded by: Chen Gang
- Succeeded by: Luo Dongchuan

Chairman of the Standing Committee of the Qinghai Provincial People's Congress
- Incumbent
- Assumed office 23 January 2025
- Preceded by: Chen Gang

Governor of Qinghai
- In office 31 March 2022 – 4 January 2025
- Party Secretary: Xin Changxing; Chen Gang
- Preceded by: Xin Changxing
- Succeeded by: Luo Dongchuan

Personal details
- Born: January 1966 (age 60) Taihe County, Jiangxi, China
- Party: Chinese Communist Party (1986-)
- Education: Jiangxi University; Jiangxi University of Finance and Economics

Chinese name
- Simplified Chinese: 吴晓军
- Traditional Chinese: 吳曉軍
Transcriptions
Standard Mandarin
- Hanyu Pinyin: Wú Xiǎojūn

Wu Xiaojun (Chinese: 吴晓军; born January 1966) is a Chinese politician and the current party secretary of Gansu since September 2026.

== Early life and education ==
Wu was born in Taihe County, Jiangxi, in January 1966. In 1984, he entered Jiangxi University, majoring in political economics.

== Career in Jiangxi ==
He joined the Chinese Communist Party (CCP) in May 1986, and got involved in politics in July 1988, when he was assigned to Jiangxi Economic Information Center as an official. Beginning in May 1994, he served in several posts in the General Office of Jiangxi Provincial People's Government, including section member, secretary, and deputy director. He was appointed vice mayor of Yingtan in August 2006 and was admitted to member of the standing committee of the CCP Yingtan Municipal Committee, the province's top authority. In June 2010, he became deputy director of Jiangxi Provincial Development and Reform Commission, rising to director in October 2014. He was promoted to be vice governor of Jiangxi in March 2017, and two years later was promoted to member of the standing committee of the CCP Jiangxi Provincial Committee, the province's top authority. In March 2020, he was appointed party secretary of the capital Nanchang, the top political position in the city.

== Career in Qinghai ==
In April 2021, he was transferred to northwest China's Qinghai province and appointed deputy party secretary, concurrently serving as party branch secretary of Qinghai since March 2022. On March 31, he was named acting governor of Qinghai, succeeding Xin Changxing. On 31 December 2024, he was made party secretary of Qinghai, succeeded Chen Gang.

== Career in Gansu ==
On 22 September 2026, he was appointed Party Secretary of Gansu, succeeding Hu Changsheng.

Government offices
Preceded by Xie Bilian (谢碧联)	Director of Jiangxi Provincial Industry and Information Technology Commission; 2013–2014	Succeeded by Hu Shizhong
Preceded by Li Anze	Director of Jiangxi Provincial Development and Reform Commission; 2014–2017	Succeeded by Zhang Heping (张和平)
Preceded by Xin Changxing	Governor of Qinghai; 2022–2025	Succeeded by Luo Dongchuan
Party political offices
Preceded by Ying Meigen	Party Secretary of Nanchang; 2020–2021	Succeeded by Li Hongjun
Preceded by Liu Ning	Specifically-designated Deputy Party Secretary of Qinghai; 2021–2022	Succeeded by Yin Bai
Preceded by Chen Gang	Party Secretary of Qinghai; 2024–2026	Succeeded by Luo Dongchuan
Preceded by Hu Changsheng	Party Secretary of Gansu; 2026–	Incumbent
