= Provinces of China =

Provinces 省 Shěng
- Location: China
- Number: 22+1 claimed but not controlled
- Subdivisions: Sub-provincial city, Prefecture-level divisions

Provinces

Chinese name
- Simplified Chinese: 省
- Traditional Chinese: 省
Transcriptions
Standard Mandarin
- Hanyu Pinyin: Shěng

Tibetan name
- Tibetan: ཞིང་ཆེན།
Transcriptions
- Wylie: zhing chen
- Tibetan Pinyin: Xingqên

Zhuang name
- Zhuang: Swngj

Korean name
- Hangul: 성
Transcriptions
- Revised Romanization: seong
- McCune–Reischauer: sŏng

Mongolian name
- Mongolian Cyrillic: муж
- Mongolian script: ᠮᠤᠵᠢ
Transcriptions
- SASM/GNC: muǰi

Uyghur name
- Uyghur: ئۆلكە
Transcriptions
- Latin Yëziqi: ölke
- Yengi Yeziⱪ: ɵlkə
- SASM/GNC: ölkä
- Siril Yëziqi: өлкә

Manchu name
- Manchu script: ᡤᠣᠯᠣ
- Möllendorff: golo

Kazakh name
- Kazakh: ولكە өлке ölke

Kyrgyz name
- Kyrgyz: ۅلكۅ өлкө ölkö

Provinces (Chinese: 省; pinyin: Shěng) are the most numerous type of province-level divisions, the first-level subdivisions of the People's Republic of China (PRC). There are currently 22 provinces administered by the PRC, and one further area that it claims but does not administer, which is Taiwan Province.

The local governments of Chinese provinces consist of a Provincial People's Government headed by a governor that acts as the executive, a Provincial People's Congress with legislative powers, and a parallel provincial branch of the Chinese Communist Party (CCP) that elects a party secretary and a provincial standing committee.

== Government ==
Provinces are the most common form of province-level governments. The legislative bodies of the provinces are the Provincial People's Congresses. The executive branch is the Provincial People's Government, led by a governor. The People's Government is answerable to both the State Council and the Provincial People's Congress. The provincial branch of the CCP has a Provincial Party Congress every five years, and elects a Standing Committee to exercise its authority when not in session. The Provincial Party Secretary is the de facto most important position in the province.

== History ==
The first provinces were created by the Mongol-led Yuan dynasty, and have remained one of the most stable forms of Chinese government since then. They were created to help the Imperial court manage local county governments, which were too numerous and far-flung to be managed directly. The number of provinces grew steadily during subsequent dynasties, reaching 28 by the time of the Republic of China. During the Warlord Era, provinces became largely or completely autonomous and exercised significant national influence. Province-level units proliferated and under the early People's Republic there were over 50. Political boundaries are, in part, established to counterbalance the influence of economic factors. For instance, the Yangtze Delta is divided among the provinces of Zhejiang, Jiangsu, and Anhui. This division ensures that economic strength is distributed, preventing any single region from potentially overpowering the state.

== List of provinces ==
GB/T 2260-2007	ISO	Province	Map	Chinese Hanyu Pinyin	Capital City or Municipal	Largest city	Population (2020)	Density (per km^{2})	Area (km^{2})	Abbreviation (Note: Abbreviation in the parentheses is informal)
HE	CN-HE	Hebei		河北省; Héběi Shěng	Shijiazhuang		74,610,235	393.08	189,809	冀 Jì
SX	CN-SX	Shanxi		山西省; Shānxī Shěng	Taiyuan		34,915,616	222.80	156,713	晋 Jìn
LN	CN-LN	Liaoning		辽宁省; Liáoníng Shěng	Shenyang		42,591,407	289.59	147,076	辽 Liáo
JL	CN-JL	Jilin		吉林省; Jílín Shěng	Changchun		24,073,453	126.51	190,282	吉 Jí
HL	CN-HL	Heilongjiang		黑龙江省; Hēilóngjiāng Shěng	Harbin		31,850,088	67.37	472,766	黑 Hēi
JS	CN-JS	Jiangsu		江苏省; Jiāngsū Shěng	Nanjing		84,748,016	847.91	99,949	苏 Sū
ZJ	CN-ZJ	Zhejiang		浙江省; Zhèjiāng Shěng	Hangzhou		64,567,588	615.67	104,873	浙 Zhè
AH	CN-AH	Anhui		安徽省; Ānhuī Shěng	Hefei		61,027,171	436.29	139,879	皖 Wǎn
FJ	CN-FJ	Fujian (Note: Most of Fujian is administered by the People's Republic of China, but the Republic of China governs Kinmen County and Lienchiang County (the Matsu Islands) as part of its own Fujian Province.)		福建省; Fújiàn Shěng	Fuzhou	Xiamen	41,540,086	335.66	123,756	闽 Mǐn
JX	CN-JX	Jiangxi		江西省; Jiāngxī Shěng	Nanchang		45,188,635	270.69	166,939	赣 Gàn
SD	CN-SD	Shandong		山东省; Shāndōng Shěng	Jinan	Qingdao	101,527,453	643.78	157,704	鲁 Lǔ
HA	CN-HA	Henan		河南省; Hénán Shěng	Zhengzhou		99,365,519	600.52	165,467	豫 Yù
HB	CN-HB	Hubei		湖北省; Húběi Shěng	Wuhan		57,752,557	310.87	185,776	鄂 È
HN	CN-HN	Hunan		湖南省; Húnán Shěng	Changsha		66,444,864	313.65	211,842	湘 Xiāng
GD	CN-GD	Guangdong (Note: Most of Guangdong is administered by the People's Republic of China, but the Republic of China governs Pratas Island as part of the special municipality of Kaohsiung City.)		广东省; Guǎngdōng Shěng	Guangzhou	Shenzhen	126,012,510	700.02	180,013	粤 Yuè
HI	CN-HI	Hainan (Note: Most of Hainan is administered by the People's Republic of China, while the Spratly Islands are claimed in whole or in part by numerous surrounding countries, China deploy its military personnel in some of the islands, see the Spratly Islands dispute)		海南省; Hǎinán Shěng	Haikou		10,081,232	294.27	34,259	琼 Qióng
SC	CN-SC	Sichuan		四川省; Sìchuān Shěng	Chengdu		83,674,866	174.93	484,056	川(蜀); Chuān (Shǔ)
GZ	CN-GZ	Guizhou		贵州省; Guìzhōu Shěng	Guiyang		38,562,148	218.93	176,140	贵(黔); Guì (Qián)
YN	CN-YN	Yunnan		云南省; Yúnnán Shěng	Kunming		47,209,277	123.20	383,195	云(滇); Yún (Diān)
SN	CN-SN	Shaanxi		陕西省; Shǎnxī Shěng	Xi'an		39,528,999	192.24	205,624	陕(秦); Shǎn (Qín)
GS	CN-GS	Gansu		甘肃省; Gānsù Shěng	Lanzhou		25,019,831	54.70	457,382	甘(陇); Gān (Lǒng)
QH	CN-QH	Qinghai		青海省; Qīnghǎi Shěng	Xining		5,923,957	8.58	720,000	青 Qīng
TW	CN-TW (Note: Has separate ISO 3166-2 code: TW)	Taiwan (Note: The People's Republic of China considers Taiwan to be its 23rd province, but Taiwan is currently ruled by the Republic of China. For more information, see the political status of Taiwan.)		台湾省; Táiwān Shěng	Taipei	–	–	–	–	台 Tái

== See also ==
- Federalism in China
- Administrative divisions of China
- List of Chinese provincial-level divisions by GDP
- List of Chinese administrative divisions by population
- List of current Chinese provincial leaders
- Regional discrimination in China
- Tiao-kuai
- Yangtze Delta
- Zhou (administrative division)
- Special administrative regions of China

== Bibliography ==
- Goodman, David S.G. (2015). Handbook of the Politics of China. Northampton, Massachusetts: Edward Elgar Publishing Limited.
- Saich, Tony (2015). Governance and Politics of China (Fourth ed.). New York: Palgrave Macmillan.
- Chung, Jae Ho; Lam, Chiu (2010). China's Local Administration: Traditions and Changes in the Sub-National Hierarchy. New York: Routledge.
- Fitzgerald, John (2002). Rethinking China's Provinces. New York: Routledge.
- Guo, Rongxing (2017). How the Chinese Economy Works (4th Revised ed.). Palgrave Macmillan.
