= Zhang Guohua (politician, born 1964) =

Chinese politician

- 张国华

Chairman of the Hebei Provincial Committee of the Chinese People's Political Consultative Conference
- Incumbent
- Assumed office 23 January 2024
- Preceded by: Lian Yimin

Personal details
- Born: November 1964 (age 61) Wujiang County, Jiangsu, China
- Party: Chinese Communist Party
- Education: Changshu Institute of Technology; Nanjing Normal University

Chinese name
- Simplified Chinese: 张国华
- Traditional Chinese: 張國華
Transcriptions
Standard Mandarin
- Hanyu Pinyin: Zhāng Guóhuá

Zhang Guohua (Chinese: 张国华; born November 1964) is a Chinese politician, serving as chairman of the Hebei Provincial Committee of the Chinese People's Political Consultative Conference since January 2024.

He was a representative of the 19th and is a representative of the 20th National Congress of the Chinese Communist Party. He is an alternate of the 20th Central Committee of the Chinese Communist Party. He was a delegate to the 12th and is a delegate to the 14th National People's Congress.

== Early life and education ==
Zhang was born in Wujiang County (now Wujiang District of Suzhou), Jiangsu, in November 1964. In 1983, he entered Suzhou Normal School (now Changshu Institute of Technology), where he majored in biology. He joined the Chinese Communist Party (CCP) in June 1985 upon graduation. After graduating in 1985, he pursued advanced studies at Nanjing Normal University.

== Career ==
=== Jiangsu ===
After university in 1987, Zhang taught at his alma mater Suzhou Normal School.

Zhang got involved in politics in September 1989, when he was assigned to the Youth Work Department of Suzhou Municipal Committee of the Communist Youth League of China, where he finally was elevated to the director in December 1993. In April 1996, he became deputy general manager of Suzhou Material Holdings (Group) Co., Ltd., but having held the position for only two years. He was chosen as deputy secretary-general of Suzhou Municipal People's Government in 1998, a position he held until 2020. He served as mayor of Kunshan from December 2002 to June 2006, and party secretary, the top political position in the city, from June 2006 to April 2011. He became mayor of Nantong, in April 2011, and then party secretary of Xuzhou, beginning in January 2016. He also served as chairman of Xuzhou Municipal People's Congress between February 2017 and January 2018.

=== Yunnan ===
Zhang was appointed vice governor of Yunnan in January 2018 and over a year later was admitted to standing committee member of the CCP Yunnan Provincial Committee, the province's top authority. He concurrently served as head of the United Front Work Department of the CCP Yunnan Provincial Committee and party branch secretary of the Yunnan Provincial Committee of the Chinese People's Political Consultative Conference.

=== Hebei ===
In December 2020, Zhang was transferred to north China's Hebei province and was admitted to standing committee member of the CCP Hebei Provincial Committee, the province's top authority. He was vice governor in February 2021, in addition to serving as director and party secretary of the Management Committee of Xiong'an New Area. In January 2024, he assumed the position of chairman of the Hebei Provincial Committee of the Chinese People's Political Consultative Conference, the provincial advisory body.

Government offices
| Preceded by Zhang Lei | Mayor of Kunshan; 2002–2006 | Succeeded by Guan Aiguo |
| Preceded by Ding Dawei | Mayor of Nantong; 2011–2016 | Succeeded by Han Liming |
| Preceded by Chen Gang | Director of the Management Committee of Xiong'an New Area; 2020–present | Incumbent |
Party political offices
| Preceded by Cao Xinping | Communist Party Secretary of Kunshan; 2006–2011 | Succeeded by Guan Aiguo |
| Preceded by Cao Xinping | Communist Party Secretary of Xuzhou; 2016–2018 | Succeeded by Zhou Tiegen |
| Preceded by Yang Ning | Head of the United Front Work Department of the Yunnan Provincial Committee of the Chinese Communist Party; 2020 | Succeeded by Yang Yalin |
| Preceded by Chen Gang | Secretary of the Xiong'an New Area Working Committee of the Chinese Communist Party; 2020–present | Incumbent |
Assembly seats
| Preceded by Cao Xinping | Chairman of Xuzhou Municipal People's Congress; 2017–2018 | Succeeded by Zhou Tiegen |
| Preceded by Lian Yimin | Chairman of the Hebei Provincial Committee of the Chinese People's Political Consultative Conference; 2024–present | Incumbent |
