= 1908 in China =

- Decades: 1880s; 1890s; 1900s; 1910s; 1920s
- See also: Other events of 1908; History of China • Timeline • Years

Events from the year 1908 in China.

== Incumbents ==
- Emperor: Guangxu Emperor

=== Viceroys ===
- Viceroy of Zhili — Yang Shixiang
- Viceroy of Min-Zhe — Songshou
- Viceroy of Huguang — Chen Kuilong then Ruicheng
- Viceroy of Shaan-Gan — Shengyun then Changgeng
- Viceroy of Liangguang — Zhang Renjun then Yang Shuxun then Zengqi
- Viceroy of Yun-Gui — Xiliang then Li Jingxi
- Viceroy of Sichuan — Zhao Erxun then Duanfang
- Viceroy of Liangjiang — Duanfang then Fan Zengxiang then Zhang Renjun

== Events ==
- March 4 – One of earlier financial service founded in this nation, China Bank of Communications was founded.
- July 22 — The Qing government issues the Outline of Imperial Constitution, based on the Meiji Constitution of Japan, which establishes a framework for local and national legislative elections to be held.
- December 2 — Aisin Gioro Puyi ascended the throne at the age of three as the Xuantong Emperor, the twelfth and final ruler of the Qing dynasty.

== Births ==
- February 19 – Qin Hanzhang, engineer (died 2019)
- July – Yin Linping, politician (died 1984)
- October 26 – Zhao Shangzhi, military commander (died 1942)
- November 7 – Zhou Yang, literary and political theorist (died 1989)
- December 31 – Zhu Zhixian, psychologist (died 1981)

== Deaths ==
- November 14 - Guangxu Emperor (b. 1871)
- November 15 - Empress Dowager Cixi (b. 1835)
