= 1909 in China =

- Decades: 1880s; 1890s; 1900s; 1910s; 1920s
- See also: Other events of 1909; History of China • Timeline • Years

The following lists events that happened during 1909 in China.

== Incumbents ==
- Emperor: Xuantong Emperor（Empress Dowager Longyu proxy）
- Regent: Zaifeng, Prince Chun

=== Viceroys ===
- Viceroy of Zhili — Yang Shixiang then Natong then Duanfang
- Viceroy of Min-Zhe — Songshou
- Viceroy of Huguang — Chen Kuilong then Ruicheng
- Viceroy of Shaan-Gan — Shengyun then Changgeng
- Viceroy of Liangguang — Zhang Renjun then Yang Shuxun then Zengqi
- Viceroy of Yun-Gui — Xiliang then Li Jingxi
- Viceroy of Sichuan — Zhao Erxun then Duanfang
- Viceroy of Liangjiang — Duanfang then Fan Zengxiang then Zhang Renjun

== Events ==
- Chinese provinces (except Xinjiang) hold elections for the first time, for provincial legislatures and the National Assembly.
- January 2 - The Qing government dismissed Yuan Shikai.

== Births ==
- March 2 — Wang Heshou, Second Secretary of the Central Commission for Discipline Inspection (d. 1999)
- March 21 – Bai Shouyi, ethnologist, historian, social activist and writer (d. 2000)
- April 12 – Mou Zongsan, philosopher and translator (d. 1995)
- June 21 – Pok Shau-fu, journalist and politician (d. 2000)
- June 23
  - Geng Biao, 5th Minister of National Defense of China (d. 2000)
  - Li Xiannian, President of the People's Republic of China (d. 1992)
- June 30 – Su Bingqi, archaeologist (d. 1997)
- July 11 – Song Renqiong, political and military leader (d. 2005)
- October 26 – Teng Haiqing, military officer and politician (d. 1997)
- November 17 — Huo Shilian, politician (d. 1996)
