= 1907 in China =

- Decades: 1880s; 1890s; 1900s; 1910s; 1920s
- See also: Other events of 1907; History of China • Timeline • Years

Events from the year 1907 in China.

== Incumbents ==
- Guangxu Emperor (33rd year)

=== Viceroys ===
- Viceroy of Zhili — Yuan Shikai then Yang Shixiang
- Viceroy of Min-Zhe — Ding Zhenduo then Songshou
- Viceroy of Huguang — Zhang Zhidong then Zhao Erxun
- Viceroy of Shaan-Gan — Shengyun
- Viceroy of Liangguang — Zhao Fu then Cen Chunxuan then Zhang Renjun
- Viceroy of Yun-Gui — Cen Chunxuan then Xiliang
- Viceroy of Sichuan — Xiliang then Zhao Erfeng then Chen Kuilong
- Viceroy of Liangjiang — Duanfang

== Events ==
- April 20 — Due to the Northeast area of the Great Qing established the administrative regions, Zhu Jiabao was appointed as Governor of Jilin Province.
- China Centenary Missionary Conference
- Peking to Paris automobile race

== Births ==
- May 14 - Bo Gu and Gao Zhihang
- July 5 - Yang Shangkun
- July 14 - Xiao Ke
- September 10 - Song Shilun
- December 5 - Lin Biao

== Deaths ==
- July 7 - Xu Xilin
- July 15 - Qiu Jin
