= 1995 in China =

- Decades: 1970s; 1980s; 1990s; 2000s; 2010s
- See also: Other events of 1995; History of China • Timeline • Years

The following lists events from 1995 in China.

== Incumbents ==
- People’s Republic of China (Mainland China)
  - Party General Secretary: Jiang Zemin
  - President: Jiang Zemin
  - Vice President: Rong Yiren
  - Premier: Li Peng
  - Vice Premier: Zhu Rongji
- Republic of China (Taiwan, Penghu, Kinmen, Mazu and the other islands)
  - President: Lee Teng-hui
  - Vice President: Lee Yuan-tsu

=== Governors ===
- Governor of Anhui Province – Hui Liangyu
- Governor of Fujian Province – Chen Mingyi then He Guoqiang
- Governor of Gansu Province – Zhang Wule then Sun Ying
- Governor of Guangdong Province – Zhu Senlin then Lu Ruihua
- Governor of Guizhou Province – Chen Shineng then Wu Yixia
- Governor of Hainan Province – Ruan Chongwu
- Governor of Hebei Province – Ye Liansong
- Governor of Heilongjiang Province – Tian Fengshan
- Governor of Henan Province – Ma Zhongchen
- Governor of Hubei Province – Jia Zhijie then Jiang Zhuping
- Governor of Hunan Province – Chen Bangzhu then Yang Zhengwu
- Governor of Jiangsu Province – Zheng Silin
- Governor of Jiangxi Province – Wu Guanzheng then Shu Shengyou
- Governor of Jilin Province – Gao Yan then Wang Yunkun
- Governor of Liaoning Province – Wen Shizhen
- Governor of Qinghai Province – Tian Chengping
- Governor of Shaanxi Province – Cheng Andong
- Governor of Shandong Province – Zhao Zhihao then Li Chunting
- Governor of Shanxi Province – Sun Wensheng
- Governor of Sichuan Province – Xiao Yang then Song Baorui
- Governor of Yunnan Province – Li Jiating
- Governor of Zhejiang Province – Wan Xueyuan

== Events ==
=== January ===
- January 22 – Miss Chinese International Pageant 1995 Finals.

=== February ===
- February 10 – BYD Group founded in Shenzhen, Guangdong Province.

=== March ===
- March 3 — Taiwan implements National Health Insurance (NHI, Chinese: 全民健康保險).

=== April ===
- April 16 to November 19 – Chinese Jia-A League 1995 was held.

=== July ===
- July 21 – Third Taiwan Strait Crisis begins.

=== September ===
- September 4 to 15 – The United Nations convened Fourth World Conference on Women in Beijing.
- September 18 – BBK Electronics founded in Dongguan, Guangdong Province.

=== November ===
- November 16 to November 26 – The 1995 World Weightlifting Championships took place in Guangzhou, China.

=== December ===
- December 2 – 1995 Republic of China legislative election was held.

=== Unknown date ===
- Mengniu Dairy, founded by Niu Gensheng in Inner Mongolia Autonomous Region.

== Births ==
- February 10 - Yang Zhaoxuan, tennis player
- August 3 – Li Haotong, professional golfer

== Death ==
- January 8 — Cao Tianqin, biochemist (b. 1920)
- January 9 — Xie Youfa, lieutenant general (b. 1917)
- January 14 — Huang Chieh, nationalist general (b. 1902)
- January 26 — Zeng Shaoshan, lieutenant general (b. 1914)
- February 6 — Xia Yan, playwright and screenwriter (b. 1900)
- February 13 — Li Zhisui, physician and personal doctor of Mao Zedong (b. 1919)
- March 22 — Huang Jiqing, geologist (b. 1904)
- March 23 — Lou Zhicen, pharmacognosist and educator (b. 1920)
- April 10
  - Chen Yun, statesman (b. 1905)
  - Feng Depei, neuroscientist and physiologist (b. 1907)
- April 12 — Mou Zongsan, philosopher and translator (b. 1909)
- April 13 — Lang Jingshan, photojournalist (b. 1892)
- April 21 — Kang Shi'en, Former Vice Premier of China (b. 1915)
- May 5 — Ye Qianyu, painter and pioneering manhua artist (b. 1907)
- May 8 — Teresa Teng, pop singer (b. 1953)
- June 25 — Li Jukui, general and politician (b. 1904)
- August 9 — Suen Kam Shun, footballer (b. 1907)
- August 23 — Chen Pixian, politician (b. 1916)
- September 8 — Eileen Chang, essayist, novelist and screenwriter (b. 1920)
- October 11 — Huang Yijun, conductor and composer (b. 1915)
- November 2 — Luo Guibo, diplomat and politician (b. 1907)
- November 19 — Wan Guchan, filmmaker (b. 1900)
- November 29 — Wu De, politician (b. 1913)
- December 8 — Ding Shande, composer, pianist and music teacher (b. 1911)
- December 16 — Shui Hua, film director (b. 1916)

== See also ==
- List of Chinese films of 1995
- List of Hong Kong films of 1995
- See also:Category:1995 Establishments in China
