= 1912 in China =

- Decades: 1890s; 1900s; 1910s; 1920s; 1930s
- See also: Other events of 1912; History of China • Timeline • Years

The following events occurred in China in the year 1912.

== Incumbents ==
- Emperor: Xuantong Emperor (3rd year)
- President of the Republic of China - Sun Yat-sen until March 10, Yuan Shikai
- Vice President of the Republic of China - Feng Guozhang
- Premier of the Republic of China - Tang Shaoyi from March 13 until June 27, Lu Zhengxiang until September 22, Zhao Bingjun

=== Viceroys ===
- Viceroy of Zhili — Chen Kuilong
- Viceroy of Liangjiang — Zhang Renjun

== Events ==
=== January ===
- January 1
  - The Republic of China was announced to be established.
  - Sun Yat-sen elected First Provisional President of the ROC by delegates from independent provinces.

=== February ===
- February 12 – The Manchu Qing Dynasty of China comes to an end after 268 years, with the abdication of Emperor Puyi in favour of the Republic of China.

=== August ===
- August 25 – The Kuomintang, the Chinese nationalist party, was founded.
- August 29 – Flooding in Wenzhou caused by a typhoon kills up to 220,000 people.

== Notable births ==
- February 2 - Zhu Shenghao, Chinese translator (died 1944)
- February 14 - Nie Er, Chinese musician (died 1935)
- June 27 - Chen Kenmin, Chinese-born Japanese chef (died 1990)
- July 26 - Qigong, Chinese calligrapher, artist, painter, connoisseur and sinologist (died 2005)
- October 27 - C. C. Li, Chinese-American geneticist (died 2003)
- November 14 - Tung-Yen Lin, Chinese structural engineer (died 2003)

== Notable deaths ==
- April 21 - Yung Wing, the first Chinese overseas student (born 1828)
