= List of Chinese films of 1995 =

A list of mainland Chinese films released in 1995:

Title	Director	Cast	Genre	Notes
A Single's Child Story	Yang Yizhi	Shuqin Yan, Bao Hua Li, Zhang Xiao Hua, Shuo Yang, Junmei Zhao	Drama	
Blush	Li Shaohong	He Saifei, Wang Ji	Drama	Silver Bear at the 45th Berlin International Film Festival
The Conqueror	Teng Wenji		Drama	
Don't Cry, Nanking	Wu Ziniu	Rene Liu	War/Drama	
Goldfish	Wu Di		Drama	Dragons and Tigers Award at the Vancouver International Film Festival
A Mongolian Tale	Xie Fei	Tengger, Naranhua	Drama	
On the Beat	Ning Ying	Li Zhanhe	Comedy/Drama	
Penitentiary Angel	Xie Jin	Zhao Wei	Drama	Also known as Behind the Wall of Shame
Postman	He Jianjun	Feng Yuanzheng	Drama	
Rain Clouds over Wushan	Zhang Ming		Drama	Also known as In Expectation
Red Cherry	Ye Daying	Guo Keyu, Xu Xiaoling	War/Drama	1996 Golden Rooster for Best Picture
Shanghai Triad	Zhang Yimou	Gong Li, Li Baotian	Historical/Drama/Triad	Won the Technical Grand Prize at Cannes
Surveillance	Huang Jianxin, Yang Yazhou	Gong Feng, Ten Rujun	Comedy	
Weekend Lover	Lou Ye	Jia Hongsheng, Wang Xiaoshuai	Drama	Lou Ye's directorial debut
The Winner	Huo Jianqi	Ning Jing, Shao Bing, Geng Le	Sports	
Xiao Shan Going Home	Jia Zhangke	Wang Hongwei	Short/Drama	
Yesterday's Wine	Xia Gang		Drama	

== See also ==
- 1995 in China
