= 1911 in China =

- Decades: 1890s; 1900s; 1910s; 1920s; 1930s
- See also: Other events of 1911; History of China • Timeline • Years

The following lists events that happened during 1911 in China.

== Incumbents ==
- Emperor: Xuantong Emperor (2nd year)
- Regent: Empress Dowager Longyu

== Events ==
=== April ===
- In April, Zhao Erfeng was appointed as Viceroy of Sichuan by the Government of Great Qing. Before he took office, he was appointed by Wang Renwen. In order to stabilize the situation of Railway Protection Movement, Zhao had jointly requested local officials at various levels to request the central government to change the state-owned policy Of railways, but it was not allowed.
- April 27 — Second Guangzhou Uprising
- April 29 — Establishment of Tsinghua University

=== May ===
- May 8 — the government of Great Qing withdrew the military department and re-established the cabinet. Yikuang is the prime minister of the cabinet. The members are mainly Manchu, they are known as the Royal Cabinet.
- May 9 — The government of Great Qing promulgated the "Railway Nationalization" Act.

=== September ===
- September 7 — In Chengdu, Railway Protection Movement provoked riots.

=== October ===
- October 10 — Wuchang Uprising (Xinhai Revolution)
- October 18-December 1 — Battle of Yangxia
- October 20 — Battle of Changsha

=== December ===
- December 6 — Yuan Shikai asked Empress Dowager Longyu to ask Zaifeng for his resignation as Regent.
- December 29 — Sun Yat-sen was elected as the interim president of the Republic of China by representatives of 17 provinces in Nanjing, China, entered the Republican era.(1911 Republic of China provisional presidential election)

== Births ==
- January 13 — Yang Dezhi, general and politician (d. 1994)
- February 25 — Tan Qixiang, geographer and historian (d. 1992)
- June 1 — Xiao Hong, writer (d. 1942)
- June 4 — Sheng Tongsheng, veterinary physician and microbiologist (d. 1987)
- June 7 — Wang Zhuxi, physicist, philologist and writer (d. 1983)
- June 8 — Ho Ying-chie, Hong Kong businessman and philanthropist (d. 2000)
- July 17 — Yang Jiang, playwright, author and translator (d. 2016)
- August 6 — Ji Xianlin, indologist, linguist, palaeographer, historian and writer (d. 2009)
- August 20 — Huang Wanli, hydrologist (d. 2001)
- September 7 — Kang Keqing, politician and wife of Zhu De (d. 1992)
- October 1 — Wei-Liang Chow, Chinese-American mathematician and stamp collector (d. 1995)
- October 12
  - Dong Tonghe, linguist (d. 1963)
  - Sun Zhiyuan, alternate member of the 8th Central Committee of the Chinese Communist Party (d. 1966)
- October 28 — Shiing-Shen Chern, mathematician and poet (d. 2004)
- November 1 — Shi Ping, academic, political, and supercentenarian (d. 2024)
- November 24 — Xing Qiyi, organic chemist (d. 2002)
- December 11 — Qian Xuesen, aerospace engineer and cyberneticist (d. 2009)

== Deaths ==
- March 4 — Li Lianying, eunuch (b. 1848)
- April 27 — Lin Juemin, revolutionary (b. 1887)
- September 20 — Robert Hart, 2nd Inspector-General of the Chinese Maritime Customs Service (b. 1835)
- November 27 — Duanfang, politician, educator and collector (b. 1861)
- December 22 — Zhao Erfeng, official (b. 1845)
