= Cen (surname) =

Cen 岑
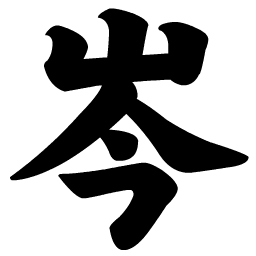
- Chinese character for surname Cen
- Pronunciation: [tsʰə̌n] (Mandarin) [sɐ̏m] (Cantonese) [gîm] (Hokkien)
- Language: Chinese

Origin
- Language: Old Chinese
- Origin: China
- Meaning: Steep hill, mountain

Other names
- Variant forms: Ts'en, Tsen, Sam, Shum, Sham, Sum, Sang, Gim, Khim, Chim

Cen is the Mandarin pinyin romanization of the Chinese surname written 岑 in Chinese character. It is romanized Ts'en in Wade–Giles, and variously as Sam, Sum, Sham, Shum in Cantonese, Gim, Khim, Chim in Taiwanese Hokkien and Chen in other pinyin forms. Cen is listed 67th in the Song dynasty classic text Hundred Family Surnames. As of 2008, it is the 235th most common surname in China, shared by 340,000 people. Cen is considered a rare surname. A person with a rare surname like Cen may be able to trace his or her origins to a single ancestral area.

== Notable people ==
- Cen Peng (岑彭; died 36 AD). Han dynasty general.
- Cen Hun (岑昏; died 280). Government Minister of Eastern Wu.
- Cen Derun (岑德潤; circa 5th - 6th century), Southern Dynasties poet.
- Cen Wenben (岑文本; 595–645). Viscount Xian of Jiangling, Tang dynasty chancellor.
- Cen Changqian (岑長倩; died 691), Tang dynasty chancellor, nephew of Cen Wenben.
- Cen Xi (岑羲; died 713), Tang dynasty chancellor, grandson of Cen Wenben.
- Cen Shen (岑參; 715–770), Tang dynasty poet.
- Cen Yuying (岑毓英; 1829–1889). Qing dynasty Governor-General of Yunnan-Guizhou, Minister of Defense.
- Cen Yubao (岑毓报; 1841–?). Qing dynasty Viceroy of Yunnan-Guizhou, younger brother of Cen Yuying.
- Cen Chunming (岑春蓂; 1868–1944). Qing dynasty Hankow Taotai. Later governor of Jiangxi, Guizhou and Hunan, son of Cen Yuying.
- Cen Guangyue (岑光樾; 1876–1960), artist
- Cen Zhongmian (岑仲勉; 1885–1961), historian
- Cen Qixiang (岑麒祥; 1903–1989). Linguist
- Cen Feilong (岑飛龍; 1905–1997). Painter and calligrapher
- Cen Kefa (岑可法; born 1935), physicist, academician of the Chinese Academy of Engineering
- Cen Zhangzhi (岑章志; born 1946), physicist, vice-president of Tsinghua University
- Cen Zeliu (岑泽鎏; 1912–1941), ace fighter pilot of Chinese Air Force during the War of Resistance-World War II, war hero and martyr
- John Shum or Cen Jianxun (born 1952). Hong Kong actor and film producer
- Cen Xu (born 1952), Vice Admiral of the PLA Navy
- Sam Hou Fai or Cen Haohui (岑浩輝, born 1962), President of the Court of Final Appeal of Macau
- Shum Kwok Pui or Cen Guopei (岑國培; born 1970), Hong Kong football player
- Harry Shum Jr. (岑勇康; born 1982), Costa Rica-born Chinese-American actor and dancer in Glee
- Cen Nanqin (born 1983), Female slalom canoer. Won gold medal in 2014 Asian Games in Woman's Slalom C-1 event.
- Eliza Sam (born 1984). Chinese-Canadian actress based in Hong Kong
- Yoyo Shum (岑寧兒; born 1984). Hong Kong singer, son of John Shum
- Lester Shum (岑敖暉), Former Deputy Secretary-general of the Hong Kong Federation of Students

== Cen clan of Guangxi ==
In Imperial China, large parts of Guangxi and Guizhou were ruled by the local tusis of the Cen clan, such as Tianzhou and the Sicheng native prefecture (Sicheng tufu). The Cens are ethnic Zhuang, but how and when they became Zhuang is unclear. Genealogies from the Ming and Qing dynasties state that their founding ancestor was Cen Zhongshu, the Song general from Zhejiang.

Prominent members include:

- Cen Zhongshu (岑仲淑; 1015–1077). Song dynasty general
- Cen Shumuhan (岑恕木罕; circa 1340), aka: Cen Numuhan. In 1340, he was granted hereditary control over the Sicheng region in Guangxi by the Mongolian Yuan Dynasty Emperor Toghon Temür. He was given the title of Khan. In Chinese he was known as and used the word Han (汗) which is a derivative of the word Khan, which means "Supreme Ruler" of his territory. He had a younger brother named Cen Tiemur (岑鐵木兒).
- Cen Boyan (岑柏颜; circa 1368), aka: Cen Bayan (岑百眼) or Cen Baiyan (岑百眼). He was known as and used the given name of the famous Mongolian generals named Bayan. In 1368, he surrendered to the advancing forces of the first Emperor of the Ming Dynasty, Zhu Yuanzhang, and as a route commander his command was changed to a prefecture and he was granted a seal and appointed a Tianzhou Prefectural Magistrate.
- Cen Tianbao (岑天保; circa 1368). In 1368, he surrendered to the first Emperor of the Ming Dynasty, Zhu Yuanzhang, and was made the Prefect of Tianzhou, Guangxi. He and the Cen clan had ancestors with Mongolian-style names due to their closed military, economic, social, and political ties with them
- Cen Meng (岑猛; 1496–1527). Chief of Tianzhou, Guangxi. Raised 100,000 man army of Han, Tang and Zhuang to defend area against Ming army colonization of Southern China.
- Cen Yidong (?–1789), Qing dynasty tusi of Tianzhou, Guangxi
- Cen Chunxuan (1861–1933), Qing dynasty Viceroy of Liangguang
- Cen Deguang (1897–1945), politician of the Wang Jingwei regime, son of Cen Chunxuan
