= Zhang Zhiwan =

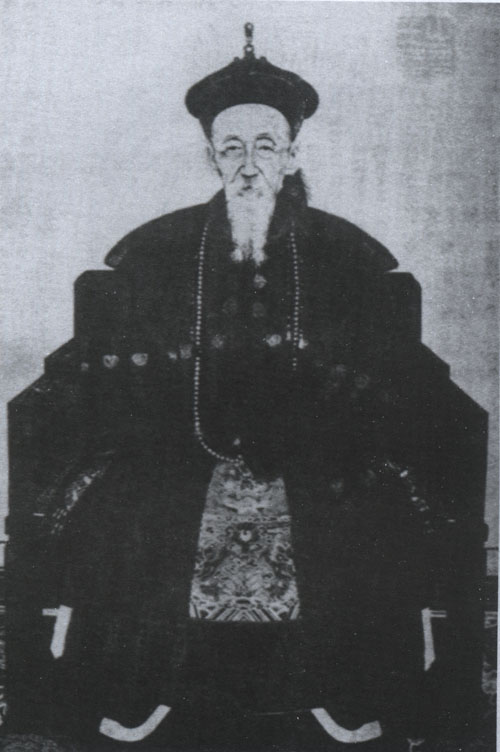

Grand Councilor
- In office 8 April 1884 – 16 November 1894

Grand Secretary of the Eastern Library
- In office 29 October 1892 – 20 October 1896

Grand Secretary of the Tiren Library
- In office 4 March 1889 – 29 October 1892

Assistant Grand Secretary
- In office 3 January 1886 – 4 March 1889

Minister of War
- In office 25 March 1882 – 13 February 1883
- Preceded by: Mao Changxi
- Succeeded by: Peng Yulin

Minister of Justice
- In office 13 February 1883 – 4 March 1889
- Preceded by: Pan Zuyin
- Succeeded by: Sun Yuwen

Viceroy of Min-Zhe
- In office 14 November 1871 – 19 November 1871
- Preceded by: Yinggui
- Succeeded by: Li Henian

Viceroy of Rivers and Waterways
- In office 11 June 1866 – 29 November 1870
- Preceded by: Wu Tang
- Succeeded by: Zhang Zhaodong

Viceroy of Eastern Rivers
- In office 13 May 1865 – 11 June 1866
- Preceded by: Zheng Dunjin
- Succeeded by: Su Tingkui

Governor of Jiangsu
- In office 29 November 1870 – 14 November 1871
- Preceded by: Zhang Zhaodong
- Succeeded by: He Jing

Governor of Henan
- In office 22 December 1862 – 13 May 1865
- Preceded by: Zheng Yuanshan
- Succeeded by: Wu Changshou

Personal details
- Born: 25 August 1811 Nanpi County, Henan, Qing Empire
- Died: 14 June 1897 (aged 85) Nanpi County, Henan, Qing Empire
- Relations: Zhang Zhidong (cousin)
- Education: Jinshi degree in the Imperial Examination
- Occupation: Politician
- Courtesy name: Ziqing (子青)
- Art name: Luanpo (鑾坡)
- Posthumous name: Wenda (文達)

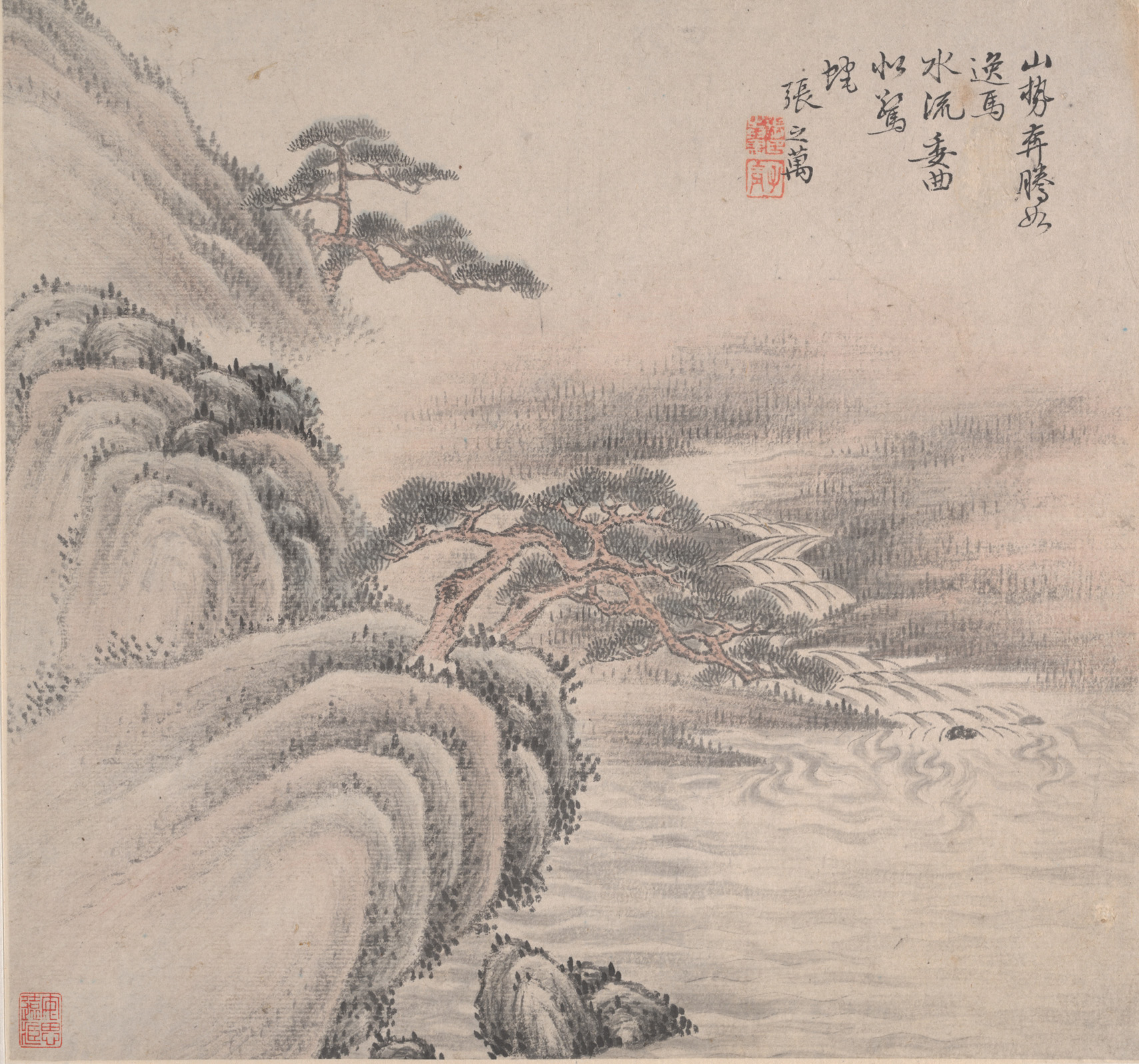
Painting by Zhang Zhiwan, Metropolitan Museum of Art

Zhang Zhiwan (Chinese: 張之萬, 25 August 1811 – 14 June 1897), courtesy name Ziqing (子青), art name Luanpo (鑾坡), was a Qing dynasty statesman and painter. He was the cousin of another prominent late Qing politician Zhang Zhidong.

== Life ==
Zhang Zhiwan was born into a prestigious local gentry family in Nanpi. His father Zhang Yuce served as a low rank official in Zhili.

Zhang's career as an official started after he passed the imperial examination as one of the three highest rank Jinshi. His first post, in the Hanlin Academy, was the compiler of chronicles. During the Taiping Rebellion, he worked as an advisor for the Qing court. Around the year of 1863, he defeated the peasants of Nian rebellion in Nanyang and Runan, at the time, he was under the military command of Sengge Rinchen. He was then moved to northern Jiangsu and was in charge of the defenses against Nian peasants until the end of the Nian rebellion.

Zhang Zhiwan held the post of viceroy of water transport between 1866 and 1870. In 1871, he served shortly as the viceroy of Minzhe before being promoted to the position of the minister of war.

In 1882, he was conferred the title of Secretary of Grand Secretariat. In 1884, he gained the access to the Grand Council and worked there for ten years. His colleague and superior in the council was Shiduo, Prince Li. Upon the touching off of the First Sino-Japanese War, he retired himself due to his old age. He died on 14 June 1897, aged 85. The imperial court bestowed the posthumous name Wenda (文達) on him. The title he held before his death was the grand secretary of the Eastern Library (東閣大學士).

== Family ==
Zhiwan had two sons

- Zhang Jiayin (1822–1882)
- Zhang Ruiyin (1867–1922)

and four grandchildren.

- Zhang Chongfu, spouse of Li Fuzeng
- Zhang Yuanji
- Zhang Kuizheng
- Zhang Baohua

Great Grandson

- Zhang Jigao
