= Zhang Houcan =

Chinese psychologist (1927–2022)

- 张厚粲
- Born: April 10, 1927; Beijing, China
- Died: December 24, 2022 (aged 95); Beijing, China
- Occupation: Psychologist

Zhang Houchuan (Chinese: 张厚粲, April 10, 1927 – December 24, 2022), from Nanpi, Hebei, was the granddaughter of Zhang Zhidong, a courtier of note in the late Qing Dynasty. She is a Chinese psychologist, and a professor at Beijing Normal University.

== Biography ==
Zhang Houchuan enrolled in Aurora University in Shanghai, China, after graduating from Bridgeman Girls' School in 1944. Zhang Houchuan returned to Beijing in 1945 as a result of the Japanese army's bombardment of Shanghai. She subsequently enrolled in the Department of Psychology at Fu Jen Catholic University, where she was instructed by Professor Lin Chuanding (Chinese: 林传鼎). She graduated from the university in 1948 with a B.S. degree in education, and remained at the university as an assistant professor. Subsequent to the nationwide restructuring of colleges and universities in 1952, the Department of Psychology at Fu Jen Catholic University was merged with the Department of Education at Beijing Normal University. She served as a visiting scholar at the University of Pittsburgh and the University of Pennsylvania in the United States from September 1981 to November 1982. She was the head of the Department of Psychology at Beijing Normal University from 1984 to 1986, where she introduced Wechsler Intelligence Scale for Children to China. She was also a visiting scholar at the University of Michigan from August 1986 to May 1987. She was designated as a Counselor of the State Council in 1988.

She was a member of the Social and Legal Affairs Committee and the Eighth National Committee of the Chinese People's Political Consultative Conference (CPPCC) from 1993 to 1997. In 1998, she was a member of the Ninth National Committee of the CPPCC and the Committee of Literature and Historical Materials. This lasted until 2002.

She died in Beijing on December 24, 2022, aged 95.
