= Xi Liang =

Xi Liang can refer to

- Western Liang:
  - Western Liang (Sixteen Kingdoms) (西涼) (400–421), one of the Sixteen Kingdoms located in modern Western China
  - Western Liang (555–587) (西梁), a state during the Southern and Northern Dynasties period, located in modern Central China
  - Liang Province in northwestern China
- Xiliang (official), an official in Qing China. Viceroy of several provinces.
