= Lime Crime =

American cosmetics brand

- Type: Public
- Industry: Cosmetics
- Founded: 2008
- Founder: Doe Deere
- Headquarters: Los Angeles, United States of America
- Owner: Stacy Panagakis
- Number of employees: 56
- Website: https://limecrime.com

Lime Crime is an American cosmetics brand that was founded and launched by Doe Deere. The brand is well known in the beauty community for its eccentric and colourful products, as well as the controversies surrounding Deere and the company. In addition, the brand was independently owned by Deere until its acquisition by Stacy Panagakis and the Tengram Capital Partners in 2018. Lime Crime is also certified as vegan and cruelty-free by both PETA and the Leaping Bunny. The brand is currently stocked at retailers such as ASOS, Revolve, Cult Beauty, Ulta and Bloomingdale's.

== Launch ==
In 2004, Doe Deere (previously Xenia Vorotova) initially launched Lime Crime as an original, handmade fashion line, which was exclusively sold from her eBay account. The brand was cofounded by her partner, Mark Dumbleton. Deere was 23 years old at the time of the launch. The original aesthetic of Lime Crime fashion was Lolita-inspired, presenting vibrant colours and abstract patterns. The official launch of Lime Crime Makeup was in October 2008, which featured a small collection of colourful glitters, loose pigments, brushes and blush. The original prices of these products ranged from US$12 to US$25.

== Products ==
As of 2026, Lime Crime exclusively sells hair dye products on its official website. 5

Previously, the brand offered makeup, hair products, and accessories across six categories: Lips, Eyes, Face, Hair, Bundles, and Accessories. Its range reportedly included 102 makeup products and 24 shades of hair dye.

== Marketing ==
Lime Crime utilises customer engagement, public relations and marketing strategies that revolve around creativity, individualism and uniqueness. Due to the fact that the brand could only be purchased online until recently, Lime Crime had to employ online marketing and develop a significant social media presence in order to highlight their products. Their products are positioned as tools for self-expression, especially as they encourage creativity through the consumer's creation of unique looks with their brightly coloured products. On social media, the brand actively encourages fans to post photographs of their makeup looks that utilise Lime Crime products. The brand reposts these pictures in order to simultaneously support their customers and whilst inspiring other followers to purchase these products and use them creatively. Additionally, the brand's motto is “makeup for unicorns”, which emphasises how the company believes in cosmetics as a method of self-empowerment and creative expression.

Lime Crime have been heavily marketed according to their cruelty-free, vegan brand ethos. In 2018, there were rumours circulating that the company was interested in expanding the distribution of their products to China. This is not surprising considering the fact that in 2017, the retail sales in the nation's cosmetics sector equated to US$36.4 million, with sales continuing to increase at an exponential rate. However, this expansion would be challenging to the ethos and image of the brand, as cosmetic products manufactured from foreign companies are required by law to undergo animal testing in order to sell in China. In order to retain the company's cruelty-free and vegan nature, Lime Crime sold their products through Revolve, who were able to ship to China directly from the United States of America and avoid the animal testing law. As a result of this, the previous Global General Manager of Lime Crime, Kim Walls, has stated that this method of sales in China has eliminated approximately 1,700 monthly listings from counterfeit e-retailers. Moreover, this has led to the confiscation and destruction of over US$2 million in product value in counterfeit goods from the previous year.

== Operations ==
Lime Crime was originally founded as an independent company by Doe Deere and her husband, Mark Dumbleton, in 2008. However, in 2018, the brand was purchased by Tengram Capital Partners, a private equity firm that aimed to develop Lime Crime as a conventional and commercially acceptable brand. Due to Tengram's acquisition of Lime Crime, Stacy Panagakis would replace Doe Deere as the chief executive officer. The brand's shift from an independently owned brand to a company that is supported by corporate funding would allow the brand to expand its market offerings and product distributions. Thus, Deere has joined the brand's board of directors and stepped down from the daily operations. Furthermore, Sasha Valentine, a long-time employee and Chief Creative Officer of Lime Crime, would continue to collaborate with Panagakis to succeed its growth prospects. In June, 2018, it was confirmed by a representative from Lime Crime that Kim Walls, the brand's Global General Manager had departed from the company.

== Controversies ==
=== Legal action against online critics ===
Lime Crime has threatened legal action against various influential bloggers who have given criticism to the brand and its products. These criticisms mostly revolved around the issue of repackaging wholesale pigments for a greater markup and the lack of transparency that Lime Crime provided to their customers regarding this issue. Due to this repackaging issue, many bloggers publicised the inconsistencies in product formulas, particularly in the colours and formulas of lipsticks, which were the same shade name.

A beauty blogger identified as Le Gothique claimed that she was legally warned by Lime Crime in 2009. She claimed that the brand insisted that she delete her negative review of her Lime Crime products and instead post their provided apology verbatim. A similar incident occurred in 2014, when Lime Crime sued blogger Michelle Jascynski on the basis of defamation of character and copyright infringement. Jascynski operated a blog entitled “Doe Deere Lies”, which was dedicated to exposing Lime Crime's alleged wrongdoings by providing evidence. This lawsuit totalled approximately US$250,000, but was later dismissed as it had no legal grounds. In addition to this, there are many unconfirmed claims from beauty influencers and bloggers that have stated that Lime Crime had sent them cease and desist letters. The brand has also been known for deleting critical or negative comments from their social media pages until late 2014, in an attempt to maintain their brand image.

=== "China Doll" palette and cultural appropriation ===
In early 2012, Lime Crime released a five-pan "China Doll" eyeshadow palette that sparked backlash from the makeup community due to its appropriation of Chinese culture. Consumers were displeased with the palette's advertising campaign, which showcased a caucasian model in a Japanese kimono despite the palette being based on 1920's Chinese women, believing it perpetuated the stereotype of the "Lotus Blossom" and orientalism. This cultural stereotype was further reiterated through the description of the palette:

“Don't let her milky skin, pouty mouth and flushed cheeks fool you, underneath the poised facade, there lies a heart of a tigress”.

Doe Deere issued an apology and justification of the "China Doll" advertising campaign on her blog, though many members of the beauty community felt that Deere made limited efforts to adjust the product and campaign.

=== Lime Crime's Cyber Security Leak ===
On 15 February 2015, Lime Crime reported on their Instagram account that their website had been infiltrated by credit card hackers. This security breach was active from 4 October 2014, to the date of the Instagram announcement, supposedly exposing customer data such as names, credit card details and addresses. However, many patrons of the site claimed that Lime Crime was responsible and that they dishonestly handled this credit card leak. Some claimed that the company had knowingly been using an expired SSL certificate in order to secure and store customers’ credit card information. Furthermore, the plaintiffs claimed that Lime Crime had been aware of these security breaches since November 2014, but have concealed this knowledge from consumers by ignoring early customer reports of the issue. The customer information that was exposed was further utilised to make international purchases for months. Although the majority of the victims lost approximately $200–300 USD through unauthorised international purchases, some customers reported fraud of up to US$10,000.

In December, 2017, Lime Crime faced continuous negotiations between counsel and mediation sessions with a retired judge before agreeing to a $110,000 class action settlement. This funding was to be allocated among qualifying Class Members who submitted timely and legitimate claims. The potential award for these Class Members was a payment of up to $44 as well as entitlement to a fifteen-percent discount off future purchases from Lime Crime makeup. This discount was redeemed through a coupon code, which was sent to each class member, and was valid for approximately one year. The victims of this cyber security leak responded negatively to this compensation as they no longer wanted to support the brand and its products.

=== FDA Scandal ===
On 29 July 2015, the U.S. Food and Drug Administration (FDA) reviewed the Velvetines Liquid Matte Lipsticks and issued an official warning letter for the shade “red velvet.” This letter stated that Lime Crime's use of ferric ferrocyanide and ultramarines in the formula of this particular lip stain violates the Federal Food, Drug, and Cosmetic Act. Lime Crime's social media pages articulated that this violation was because of a misprint on the product's packaging. Megan McSeveney, an FDA press officer, claims that the FDA investigation was launched as a result of receiving six complaints from consumers within a period of two months. The majority of those who complained were ignored by the brand or were simply blocked on social media platforms, such as Instagram and Twitter. Similarly to the security breach scandal, Lime Crime failed to email consumers when the FDA warning letter was released – addressing the issue through individual Instagram comments rather than by publishing a public declaration immediately. In November, 2015, Lime Crime published a FDA close-out letter on their website, which verified their corrections to the mislabelling on their product packaging.
