= Dalangdian Township =

Dalangdian Township 大浪淀乡
- Rural Township
- Dàlàngdiàn Xiāng
- Location in Hebei Location in China
- Coordinates: 38°07′06″N 116°49′27″E
- Country: People's Republic of China
- Province: Hebei
- Prefecture-level city: Cangzhou
- County: Nanpi

Area
  - Total: 110.1 km^{2} (42.5 sq mi)

Population (2010)
  - Total: 30,811
  - Density: 279.9/km^{2} (725/sq mi)
- Time zone: UTC+8 (China Standard)

Dalangdian Township (Chinese: 大浪淀乡; pinyin: Dàlàngdiàn Xiāng) is a rural township located in Nanpi County, Cangzhou, Hebei, China. According to the 2010 census, Dalangdian Township had a population of 30,811, including 15,739 males and 15,072 females. The population was distributed as follows: 5,671 people aged under 14, 22,321 people aged between 15 and 64, and 2,819 people aged over 65.

== See also ==
- List of township-level divisions of Hebei
