= Viceroy of the Three Eastern Provinces =

Regional viceroy in Qing Empire

Chinese name
- Traditional Chinese: 東三省總督
- Simplified Chinese: 东三省总督
Transcriptions
Standard Mandarin
- Hanyu Pinyin: Dōngsānshěng Zǒngdū

Governor-General of the Three Eastern Provinces and Other Local Areas, and in Charge of Managing the Generals of the Three Provinces and the Governor of Fengtian
- Traditional Chinese: 總督東三省等處地方兼管三省將軍、奉天巡撫事
- Simplified Chinese: 总督东三省等处地方兼管三省将军、奉天巡抚事
Transcriptions

Manchu name
- Manchu script: ᡩᡝᡵᡤᡳ ᡳᠯᠠᠨ ᡤᠣᠯᠣᡳ ᡠᡥᡝᡵᡳ ᡴᠠᡩᠠᠯᠠᡵᠠ ᠠᠮᠪᠠᠨ
- Romanization: dergi ilan goloi uheri kadalara amban

Jurisdiction of the Viceroy of the Three Eastern Provinces in 1911

The Viceroy of the Three Eastern Provinces, fully in Chinese as the Governor-General of the Three Eastern Provinces and Other Local Areas, and in Charge of Managing the Generals of the Three Provinces and the Governor of Fengtian, was one of eight regional Viceroys during the Qing dynasty. The Viceroy of the Three Eastern Provinces had jurisdiction of military, civil, and political affairs over then Fengtian Province, Jilin Province, and Heilongjiang Province (approx. nowadays Jilin, Heilongjiang and central and eastern part of Liaoning).

== History ==
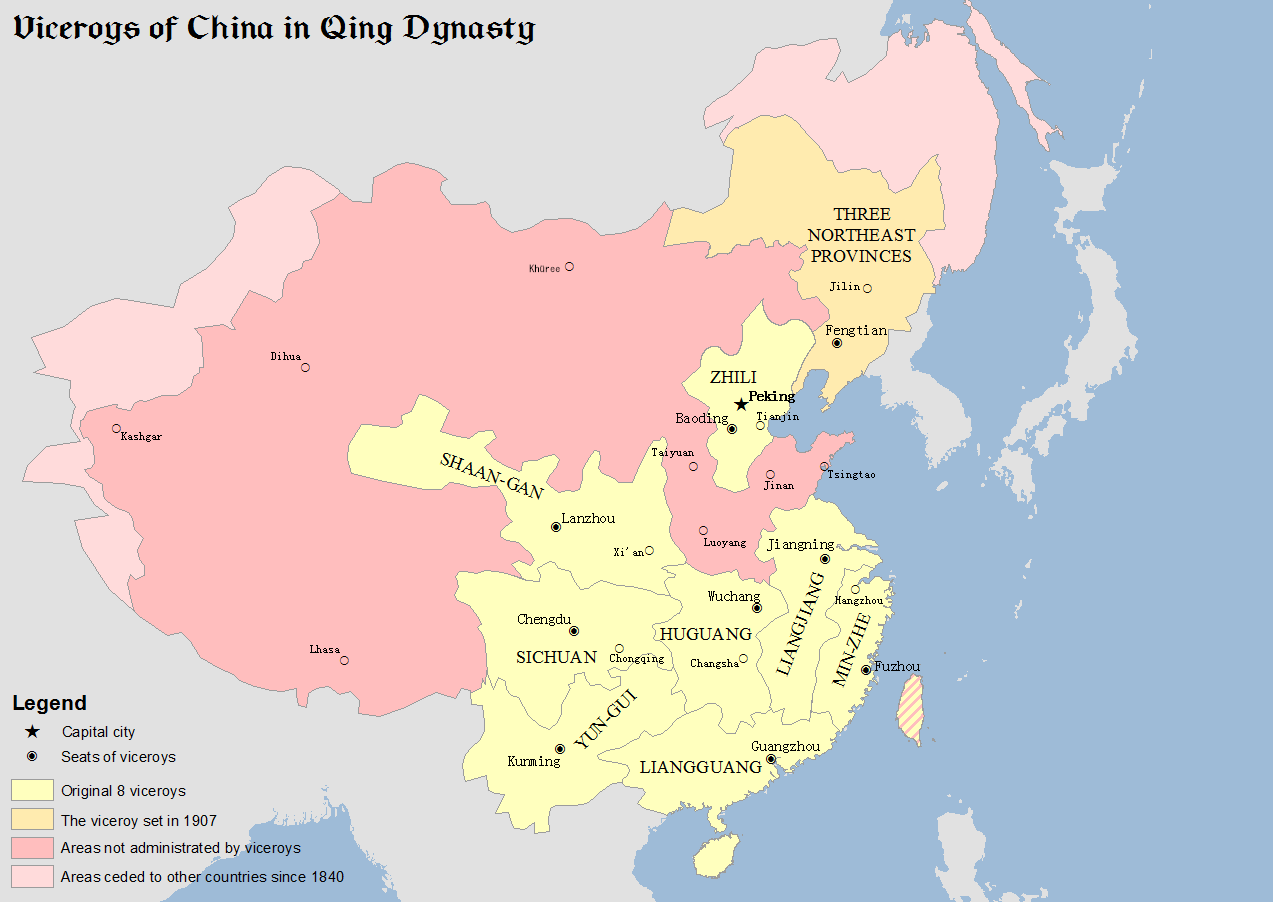
Map of viceroys in Qing Dynasty of China

The office of the Viceroy of the Three Eastern Provinces previously existed as the "General of Liaodong" (遼東將軍), which was created in 1662 during the reign of the Kangxi Emperor. The post was subsequently renamed to "General of Fengtian" (奉天將軍) and "General of Shengjing" (盛京將軍).

In 1858, the jurisdiction of the Viceroy of the Three Eastern Provinces was reduced significantly in Heilongjiang and Jilin following the Treaty of Aigun and Convention of Peking, which ceded over 1 million square kilometers of land to the Russian Empire.

In 1876, during the reign of the Guangxu Emperor, the General of Shengjing was given additional concurrent appointments as Secretary of Defence and Secretary of Justice and Prefect of Fengtian Prefecture (奉天府尹). He also gained honorary titles as a Viceroy, Secretary of Defence, and Right Censor-in-Chief of the Detection Branch. In 1907, the offices of General of Jilin, General of Heilongjiang and General of Shengjing were merged under a single office, Viceroy of the Three Eastern Provinces. The Viceroy also received an additional honorary title as an Imperial Commissioner.

From 1910 to 1911, the Viceroy concurrently held the appointment of Provincial Governor of Fengtian.

== List of Viceroys of the Three Eastern Provinces ==
#	Name	Portrait	Start of term	End of term	Notes
1	Yishan 奕山		1855	29 May 1860	
2	Xu Shichang 徐世昌		12 June 1907	8 February 1909	
3	Xiliang 錫良		8 February 1909	20 April 1911	
4	Zhao Erxun 趙爾巽		20 April 1911	12 February 1912	

== See also ==
- Manchuria under Qing rule
