= Qu Hongji =

- 瞿鴻禨
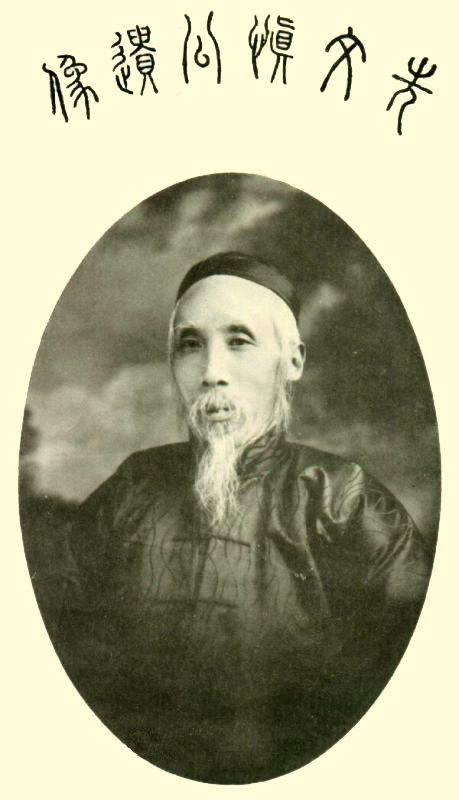

Grand Councilor
- In office 1901–1907

Assistant Grand Secretary
- In office 1906–1907

Minister of Foreign Affairs
- In office 14 November 1901 – 17 June 1907
- Monarch: Guangxu Emperor
- Preceded by: Yikuang (as minister of Zongli Yamen)
- Succeeded by: Lü Haihuan

Minister of Works
- In office 11 November 1900 – 14 November 1901 Serving with Songgui
- Monarch: Guangxu Emperor
- Preceded by: Chen Xuefen
- Succeeded by: Zhang Baixi

Personal details
- Born: 1850 Changsha, Hunan, Qing China
- Died: 1918 (aged 67–68) Shanghai, Jiangsu, Republic of China
- Education: Jinshi degree in the Imperial Examination

Qu Hongji (Chinese: 瞿鴻禨; 1850–1918), style name Zijiu (子玖), and art name Zhi'an (止庵), was a politician of the Chinese Qing Dynasty who served in several ministerial positions, most notably being the first Minister of Foreign Affairs.

== Biography ==
Qu Hongji was born in 1850 in a small town called Shanhua in the Changsha city area of Hunan Province. He passed the highest level of the Imperial Examinations (jinshi) in 1871 and went to the Hanlin Academy. During 1875 he took first place in the Daijiang Bachelor Examinations. He was promoted to Neige Bachelor in 1897, and organized Town Examinations of Fujian Province and Guangxi Province. He also supervised local government as Provincial Education Commissioner of Henan Province, Zhejiang Province and Sichuan Province. During the Sino-Japanese War of 1894-1895, Qu carried the Four Troops Assaults plan to the emperor. Then he followed the emperor's royal family when it went hunting in the west, and was raised to the position of the Minister of Work Department. Later when he returned to Beijing, he became Minister of the Military and Minister of Government Affairs. He changed the Imperial Examinations into discourses on politics, and added economy examinations. He simplified the Headquarters of All Countries Business Department into the Ministry of Foreign Affairs, and became the first Minister of Foreign Affairs. He was also a member of the Grand Council. He followed the Dowager Empress Cixi's imperial edict, and among other things proposed peace plans, was honoured by the Emperor with a gold jacket, and tutored the crown prince.

Qu Hongji was actively involved in the reform of the Imperial Examination system, and was a key proponent of the establishment of the Jinshi Bureau and reorganisation of the Hanlin Academy around 1901.

During the 'New Political Affair', government money was stolen by the 'Building School, Commercial Intercourse and encourage Jobs' organisation. Qu asked the Emperor to forbid this fraudulent group. During 1906, he worked with the Grand Secretary, to plan Provisional Constitutionalism, and nominated Ministers. During 1907 Cen Chunxuan, one of his allies, became Minister of Telecommunications, Cen took advantage of the Case of Yang Cuixi (a scandal involving the prince Zaizhen), and secretly impeached Zaizhen's father Prince Yikuang. Qu used 'Minister Slayer' Cen Chunxuan against his political enemy Yuan Shikai, which also made Prince Yikuang unhappy and he became jealous of Qu. The Empress Dowager Cixi was also becoming uncomfortable with Qu's blunt speaking and withdrew her support. Daijiang Bachelor Yun Yuding (惲毓鼎) impeached Qu for the reason that 'Qu grasps authority to form a despotic government', and the Emperor dismissed him from office and sent him back to his hometown. After the Revolution of 1911, Qu escaped to Shanghai, and he died there in 1918.

== Famous ==
Qu Hongji (瞿鸿禨) was famous not only because of his erudition, but also because his face looked like that of the Tongzhi Emperor, 10th emperor of Qing Dynasty who died in 1875.

== Publications of Authority ==
- 'Collections of Zhi An's Poems'《止庵诗文集》
- 'Annotations for Book of Han'《汉书笺识》
- 'Collections of Chaolan lou Library Poems'《超览楼诗稿》
- 'Handwriting by Duke Wenzhen of Qu'《瞿文慎公诗选遗墨》
- 'Diary of Serving Henan Province and Fujian Province'《使豫, 使闽日记》
- 'Love and Kindness History'《恩遇纪略》
- 'Old Anecdote History'《旧闻纪略》etc.

== Family ==
- Qu Xuanzhi (瞿宣治), his son, was a diplomat who served at the Chinese embassies in Switzerland and the Netherlands. He died in Marseille, France, in 1923.
- Qu Ruizhi (瞿兌之), his son, was a Chinese historian, writer, and painter.
- Qu Tongzu (瞿同祖), his grandson, was a historian known for his research on Chinese legal and social history.
- Zhu Qiqian (朱啟鈐), his nephew, was a Chinese politician, businessman, and historian of architecture.
