= Baoguantun =

Baoguantun 鲍官屯镇
- Town
- Bàoguāntún Zhèn
- Location in Hebei Location in China
- Coordinates: 38°00′05″N 116°58′14″E
- Country: People's Republic of China
- Province: Hebei
- Prefecture-level city: Cangzhou
- County: Nanpi

Area
  - Total: 97.79 km^{2} (37.76 sq mi)

Population (2010)
  - Total: 32,924
  - Density: 336.7/km^{2} (872/sq mi)
- Time zone: UTC+8 (China Standard)

Baoguantun (Chinese: 鲍官屯镇; pinyin: Bàoguāntún Zhèn) is a town located in Nanpi County, Cangzhou, Hebei, China. According to the 2010 census, Baoguantun had a population of 32,924, including 16,866 males and 16,058 females. The population was distributed as follows: 5,899 people aged under 14, 23,840 people aged between 15 and 64, and 3,185 people aged over 65.

== See also ==
- List of township-level divisions of Hebei
