= Fengjiakou =

Fengjiakou 冯家口镇
- Town
- Féngjiākǒu Zhèn
- Location in Hebei Location in China
- Coordinates: 38°09′44″N 116°44′28″E
- Country: People's Republic of China
- Province: Hebei
- Prefecture-level city: Cangzhou
- County: Nanpi

Area
  - Total: 96.92 km^{2} (37.42 sq mi)

Population (2010)
  - Total: 41,052
  - Density: 423.6/km^{2} (1,097/sq mi)
- Time zone: UTC+8 (China Standard)

Fengjiakou (Chinese: 冯家口镇; pinyin: Féngjiākǒu Zhèn) is a town located in Nanpi County, Cangzhou, Hebei, China. According to the 2010 census, Fengjiakou had a population of 41,052, including 20,936 males and 20,116 females. The population was distributed as follows: 7,819 people aged under 14, 29,895 people aged between 15 and 64, and 3,338 people aged over 65.

== See also ==
- List of township-level divisions of Hebei
