= Miss Chinese International Pageant 1995 =

- Date: January 22, 1995
- Presenters: Eric Tsang, Emil Chau, Law Ka-Ying
- Venue: TVB City, Hong Kong
- Broadcaster: TVB
- Entrants: 19
- Placements: 10
- Winner: Hsiang-Lin Ku 谷祥鈴; Taipei, Chinese Taipei
- Congeniality: Gloria Hui; Vancouver, Canada

Miss Chinese International Pageant 1995 was held on January 22, 1995, in Hong Kong. The pageant was organized and broadcast by TVB in Hong Kong. Miss Chinese International 1994 Saesim Pornapa Sui crowned Hsiang-Lin Ku of Taipei, Chinese Taipei as the winner.

== Pageant information ==
The theme to this year's pageant is "Worldly Beauty, Gathered in China" (世界艶影 薈萃中華). The Masters of Ceremonies were Eric Tsang, Emil Chau and Law Ka-Ying.

== Results ==
| Placement | Contestant | City Represented | Country Represented |
|---|---|---|---|
| Miss Chinese International 1995 | Hsiang-Lin Ku 谷祥鈴 | Taipei | Chinese Taipei |
| 1st Runner-Up | Darabhorn Bhakdeeratna 陳星光 | Bangkok | Thailand |
| 2nd Runner-Up | Edna Wei 韋以苓 | Los Angeles | USA |
| Top 5 Finalists | Linda Lai 黎秀蘭; Halina Tam 譚小環 | Johannesburg; Hong Kong | South Africa; Hong Kong |
| Top 10 Finalists | Liang Ni 倪亮; Angela Tong 湯盈盈; Anita Phang 范綺雯; Evan Chin 秦順薏; Elizabeth Lin 林儀 | Honolulu; Montréal; Ipoh; Kuala Lumpur; Singapore | USA; Canada; Malaysia; Malaysia; Singapore |

=== Special awards ===
- Miss Friendship: Gloria Hui 許家寶 (Vancouver)
- Miss Best in Swimsuit: Hsiang-Lin Ku 谷祥鈴 (Taipei)

== Crossovers ==
Contestants who previously competed or will be competing at other international beauty pageants:

Miss World

- 1994: Macau : Chen Ji-Min

Miss Universe

- 1995: Hong Kong: Halina Tam
