= Cen Deguang =

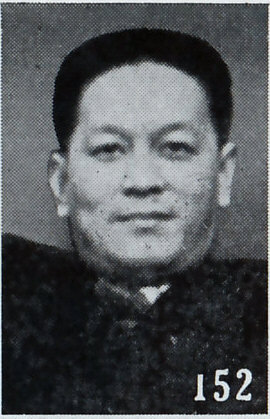
Cen Deguang as pictured in The Most Recent Biographies of Chinese Dignitaries

Cen Deguang (1897–?) was a politician of the collaborationist Wang Jingwei regime. He, along with Wang Jingwei, was considered by many Chinese to be a Hanjian, or traitor. Deguang claimed he was just following orders, since his friend Wang was his superior. He is from Guangxi, son of Cen Chunxuan.
