= Qin Hanzhang =

Chinese engineer and supercentenarian (1908–2019)

- Born: 15 February 1908; Wuxi, Jiangsu, Qing China
- Died: 15 August 2019 (aged 111 years, 181 days); Beijing, China
- Known for: Engineer; food scientist; wine scholar

Qin Hanzhang (Chinese: 秦含章; 15 February 1908 – 15 August 2019) was a Chinese engineer, scientist and supercentenarian. He was a pioneer in the field of food science and industrial fermentation and contributed to food industry development in China through nearly eight decades of work in food science technology. He was also a scholar in the wine industry.

== Biography ==
=== Early life ===
Qin was born on 15 February 1908 in Wuxi, Jiangsu, Qing dynasty. Qin was the youngest child in his family. His father, Qinru Yu (1867–1925), was a famous scholar who passed the Imperial examination at the age of 18. His mother, Su Shi (1868–1928) and father did not have a lot of money, only enough for food and clothing. Qin had been adopted by his uncle Yang Tongguan at the age of 3 and lived with them until his death. Qin was 9 years old at that time. He returned to his hometown and lived with his elder brother and his family. When Qin was 13 years old, he studied traditional Chinese medicine with his eldest brother Qin Liujiang (1892–1960). His other brother Qin Yunzhang (1906–2007), took part in the Cultural Revolution, and later became an economist.

=== Education ===
Qin went to his father's private school where he studied classics as "Three Character Classic", "Thousand Character Classic" and practiced calligraphy daily. Qin was not satisfied with reading of these "old classics" and in 1924 first encountered modern subjects such as English and mathematics. In 1925, Qin was admitted to Jiangsu University in Wuxi. After joining the school, Qin contracted dysentery and as Chinese and Western medicine practitioners could not cure him, he stayed at home.

In 1931, he graduated from Shanghai Jiao Tong University and later went to Belgium, France and Germany to study. He studied at Gembloux Agro Bio Tech University in Belgium, graduated in 1935 and received a doctoral candidate in engineering. From 1935 to 1936, he studied at Brussels University. In 1936, he entered the Institute of Chemistry and Fermentation at the University of Berlin.

=== Later life ===
In September 1936, Qin returned to China and started teaching in Jiangsu Institute of Education, in Fudan University in 1938, in Sichuan Provincial Educational College from 1939 to 1944 and in National Central University from 1944 to 1949. In 1948, he was hired by Wuxi Private Jiangnan University as the director and professor of the Department of Agricultural Production.

In 1950, Premier Zhou Enlai appointed Qin as a counselor of the Ministry of Food Industry and the Ministry of Light Industry. In 1960, the Food Industry Research Institute of the Ministry of Light Industry and the Fermentation Industry Research Institute of the Ministry of Light Industry merged to establish the Institute of Food Fermentation Industry of the Ministry of Light Industry. Qin was appointed as the first director.

In 1954, he was invited to participate in a food packaging conference in Czechoslovakia. In the early years of the Cultural Revolution, Qin's first wife, Yang Wenwei, committed suicide. One day, a group of rebels broke into Qin’s home and robbed him. In 1968, his second daughter was assigned to the Great Northern Wilderness team. The eldest daughter went to Jiaozuo, Henan after she graduated from Peking University. In 1975, he met Suo Ying, who later became his second wife.

Qin retired at the age of 82. His second wife, Suo Ying, died on 8 January 2016 at the age of 93. He lived with his daughter-in-law and grandson in Wu Dian Lu, Daxing District, Beijing. He died on 15 August 2019 at his home.
