= Postman (1995 film) =

- DVD cover
- Traditional Chinese: 郵差
- Simplified Chinese: 邮差
- Hanyu Pinyin: Yóuchāi
- Directed by: He Jianjun
- Written by: He Jianjun; You Ni
- Produced by: Tian Yan; Shu Kei
- Starring: Feng Yuanzheng; Liang Danni; Pu Quanxin; Huang Xing
- Cinematography: Wu Di
- Edited by: Liu Xiaojing
- Music by: Otomo Yoshihide
- Release date: March 21, 1995 (United States)
- Running time: 102 minutes
- Language: Mandarin

Postman (Original title: Yóuchāi) is a 1995 Chinese Mandarin drama film directed by He Jianjun and produced by Tian Yan, Shu Kei. It is the story of a shy mailman played by Feng Yuanzheng who steals and reads the letters of people on his route. The film is considered part of China's sixth generation movement.

During the making of Postman the director faced a ban and managed to release the film abroad only after smuggling print outs out of the country and completing the film abroad.

== Cast ==
- Feng Yuanzheng as Xiao Dou, postman
- Liang Danni as Xiao Dou's sister
- Zhixing Ge as Lao Wu, older postman
- Jue Chen as Chen Jie, writer
- Huang Jianxin as Yun Qing
- Zhizi Liu as Post Office Manager
- Pu Cunxin as Xiao sister's Boyfriend
- Tianwei Zheng as Wan Juan

== Plot ==
Xiao Dou (Feng Yuanzheng) is a shy and naive mailworker living in Beijing with his sister. When a coworker is fired for reading people's correspondences Xiao Dou takes over the same mail route. He soon finds himself indulging in the same curiosity, eventually developing an obsession. Xiao Dou chooses to spend time reading letters instead of socializing with friends or coworkers. As he becomes increasingly tied to the letters, he begins to intervene in the lives of those who write and receive the letters.

As Xiao Dou's amorality and detachment become more severe, his obsessions expand, as he engages in an incestuous relationship to his own sister. By the end of the film, Xiao Dou no longer considers the feelings of anyone else.

== Reception ==
Reception of Postman in the west was marked by shock and praise. Standing in contrast to many of the more polished filmmaking coming from China during the mid-1990s, such as Chen Kaige's Temptress Moon (1996) or Zhang Yimou's To Live (1994) and Raise the Red Lantern (1991), Postman was a contemporary snapshot of modern China. Scholars and critics alike grouped the film as part of the up-and-coming Sixth Generation movement that began with Zhang Yuan, Wang Xiaoshuai, and others. Today, Postman is considered one of the more important works to come out of the early years of the movement. China cinema scholar Shelly Kraicer referred to the film as "one of the most disturbing and important recent films out of China" in her review. Critics found the film "transgressive" in its satire and its unblinking depiction of homosexuality, prostitution, drug-use and adultery.

Further illustrating the film's reputation was its inclusion in the Harvard Film Archive's retrospective on the sixth generation in 2001, "The Urban Generation: Chinese Cinema and Society in Transformation."

=== Awards ===
- 1995 International Film Festival Rotterdam
  - Tiger Award (shared with: Kazama Shiori's Fuyu No Kappa and Bogdan Dumitrescu's Thalassa, Thalassa, Return To The Sea)
  - FIPRESCI Award
- 1995 International Thessaloniki Film Festival
  - Golden Alexander
- 1995 Singapore International Film Festival
  - Special Jury Prize
