= He Jianjun =

Chinese film director and screenwriter (born 1960)

- Born: 1960 (age 64–65); Beijing, China
- Occupation: Film director
- Awards: FIPRESCI Award; 1993 Red Beads (Rotterdam); 1995 Postman (Rotterdam); Golden Alexander; 1995 Postman; Rotterdam Tiger Award; 1995 Postman

Chinese name
- Traditional Chinese: 何建軍
- Simplified Chinese: 何建军
Transcriptions
Standard Mandarin
- Hanyu Pinyin: Hé Jiànjūn

He Jianjun (simplified Chinese: 何建军; traditional Chinese: 何建軍; pinyin: Hé Jiànjūn; born 1960 in Beijing ) is a Chinese film director and screenwriter. A graduate of the Beijing Film Academy, He is considered a leading voice in the so-called "Sixth Generation." He is occasionally credited under the name "He Yi."

== Career ==
He Jianjun began his film career like many of his contemporaries at the Beijing Film Academy, China's premiere film school. Upon graduating in 1990, he began an apprenticeship with some of the Fifth Generation's major figures, notably Zhang Yimou, Chen Kaige, and Tian Zhuangzhuang. He would serve as the assistant director in Zhang's Raise the Red Lantern (1992) and Tian's The Blue Kite, as well as a screenwriter for Chen Kaige's King of the Children (1987), before his debut film, Red Beads, was released in 1993 to strong reviews in the west. Filmed in only twelve days, Red Beads was based on the experiences of one of He's classmates, who had a psychotic break.

While Red Beads would win a FIPRESCI award in the 1993 International Film Festival Rotterdam, the film also caught the wrath of Chinese censors, who blacklisted He Jianjun in 1994 along with several other prominent filmmakers, including Tian Zhuangzhuang, Wang Xiaoshuai, Wu Wenguang, Zhang Yuan, and Ning Dai.

Because of the blacklisting, He Jianjun had to smuggle out his next film, Postman for post-production.

== Filmography ==
Year	English Title	Chinese Title	Notes
1994	Red Beads	悬恋	FIPRESCI Award (International Film Festival Rotterdam)
1995	Postman	邮差	Golden Alexander (International Thessaloniki Film Festival); Tiger Award (International Film Festival Rotterdam)
1999	Scenery	风景	
2001	Butterfly Smile	蝴蝶微笑	
2004	Pirated Copy	蔓延	
2008	River People	水上人家	
