= Sheng Tongsheng =

Chinese veterinarian

- Born: June 4, 1911; Changsha, Hunan, China
- Died: May 9, 1987 (aged 75); Nanjing, Jiangsu, China
- Education: Yali High School; Kiangsi Provincial No.2 High School; National Central University; Shanghai Medical College; LMU Munich; Humboldt University of Berlin
- Known for: a key founder of modern veterinary medicine in China
- Scientific career
- Fields: Veterinary medicine Microbiology

Sheng Tongsheng or Tung-sheng Sheng (Chinese: 盛彤笙; pinyin: Shèng Tóngshēng; Wade–Giles: Sheng T'ung-sheng) was a Chinese veterinary physician and microbiologist. Sheng was also made contribution to veterinary education, he was the first president of the first independent college of veterinary medicine in China, he is considered one of founders of modern Chinese veterinary medicine.

== Early life and education ==
Sheng was born at Changsha in 1911, while his ancestors came from Yongxiu, Jiangxi. He attended Yali High School at age 11. The Northern Expedition extended Changsha in 1926, thereafter he transferred to Kiangsi Provincial No.2 High School.

Sheng was enrolled at then National Central University in 1928, he entered Shanghai Medical College as a biology undergraduate in 1934. Later he won the full scholarship to study in German, after the first year at the Ludwig-Maximilians-Universität München (LMU), he transferred to the Humboldt University of Berlin, he obtained a Dr. Med. in 1936 there. Then he received his doctorate in veterinary medicine in 1938.

== Career ==
Sheng went back to China in 1938, at first he was a professor at Kiangsi Provincial Veterinary Academy (江西省立獸醫專科學校), then he went to National Northwest Associated University and worked there during 1939–41. He arrived in Chengdu, and taught at Animal Husbandry and Veterinary Medicine Department, National Central University until 1946. Meantime, Sheng overcame the rigours of research during the war, finished the paper "Virus Encephalomyelitis in Buffaloes" (Science 15 Mar 1946, Vol.103(2672), pp. 344–346).
