= Xing Qiyi =

Chinese organic chemist

- Born: 24 November 1911; Tianjin, Qing dynasty
- Died: 4 November 2002 (aged 90); Beijing, China
- Education: Fu Jen Catholic University; University of Illinois at Urbana–Champaign
- Known for: participant in the total synthesis of bovine insulin project
- Scientific career
- Fields: Organic synthesis Natural products
- Workplaces: Peking University
- Doctoral advisor: Roger Adams

Xing Qiyi (Chinese: 邢其毅; pinyin: Xíng Qíyì; Wade–Giles: Hsing Ch'i-i) was a Chinese organic chemist who contributed to the total synthesis of bovine insulin, Xing is still well-known nowadays in China as the main editor of a highly-influential organic chemistry textbook. He was a member of China Democratic League since 1952.

== Early life and education ==
Xing received Chinese traditional private education in his childhood. In 1933, he graduated from Fu Jen Catholic University with a diploma in Chemistry. Xing did his postgraduate work at University of Illinois at Urbana–Champaign under Roger Adams's guidance and obtained a doctorate degree in 1936. Later he went to the Ludwig-Maximilians-Universität München (LMU), conducting research on bufotoxins at Wieland's laboratory.

== Career ==
In 1937, Xing returned to China. He moved to Kunming since eastern China was occupied by Japanese invaders. There, he spent some efforts on the refining of Quinine. Then Xing joined the New Fourth Army as a teacher in its military medical school. Moreover, he assisted the army to product medicine.

In 1946, Xing went back to Beijing and accepted an appointment as a professor at Peking University.

In the 1950s, Xing designed a new method to synthesize the chloramphenicol.

During 1964–65, Xing participated in the total synthesis of bovine insulin project, co-operating with Shanghai Institutes for Biological Sciences.

In 1980, Xing was elected as an academician of the Chinese Academy of Sciences.

During 1981–87, Xing focused on the activation methods for the carboxyl group in the peptide synthesis, and developed related chemical reagents.

== Personal life ==
Xing enjoyed collecting crafts relevant the tortoise.

Xing's father Duan (Chinese: 邢端) was a member of Hanlin Academy in the Late Qing dynasty, he once studied in Japan and used to be an officer at the Beiyang government. Xing's mother, Zhang Xian (Chinese: 張嫻), was a housewife. Xing and his wife Qian Cunrou (simplified Chinese: 钱存柔; traditional Chinese: 錢存柔), a microbiologist, had two sons.
