= Cen Chunxuan =

Chinese politician

- 岑春煊
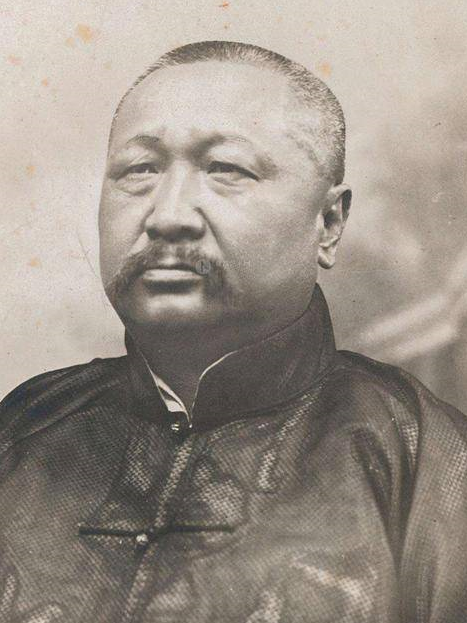

President of Constitutional Protection Junta
- In office 21 August 1918 – 23 October 1920
- Preceded by: Office established
- Succeeded by: Sun Yat-sen

Minister of Posts and Communications
- In office 3 May 1907 – 28 May 1907
- Monarch: Guangxu
- Preceded by: Lin Zhaonian
- Succeeded by: Chen Bi

Viceroy of Liangguang
- In office 18 April 1903 – 11 September 1906
- Preceded by: Tao Mo
- Succeeded by: Zhou Fu

Provincial Governor of Guangdong
- In office 23 July 1905 – 11 September 1906
- Preceded by: Zhang Renjun
- Succeeded by: Zhou Fu
- In office 3 July 1902 – 5 August 1902
- Preceded by: De Shou
- Succeeded by: Li Qingrui
Other political offices
Viceroy of Sichuan
In office 23 October 1911 – 29 October 1911
Preceded by	Zhao Erfeng
Succeeded by	Duanfang
In office 5 August 1902 – 18 April 1903
Preceded by	Guizun
Succeeded by	Xilang
Viceroy of Liangguang (not assumed office, Hu Shanglin acting)
In office 28 May 1907 – 12 August 1907
Preceded by	Zhou Fu
Succeeded by	Zhang Renjun
Viceroy of Yun-Gui
In office 11 September 1906 – 3 March 1907
Preceded by	Ding Zhenduo
Succeeded by	Xilang
Provincial Governor of Guizhou
In office 9 October 1905 – 3 September 1906
Preceded by	Lin Zhaonian
Succeeded by	Peng Xiongshu
Provincial Governor of Shanxi
In office 11 March 1901 – 3 July 1902
Preceded by	Xilang
Succeeded by	Ding Zhenduo
Provincial Governor of Shaanxi
In office 26 September 1900 – 11 March 1901
Preceded by	Duanfang (Acting)
Succeeded by	Duanfang (Acting)

Personal details
- Born: 2 May 1861 Xilin, Guangxi, Qing Empire
- Died: 27 April 1933 (aged 71) Shanghai, China
- Party: Kuomintang (KMT)
- Children: Cen Deguang
- Occupation: Politician

Military service
- Allegiance: Empire of China; Kuomintang; National Revolutionary Army; Republic of China

Cen Chunxuan
- Chinese: 岑春煊
Transcriptions
Standard Mandarin
- Hanyu Pinyin: Cén Chūnxuān
- Wade–Giles: Tsen Chun-hsuan

Yunjie (courtesy name)
- Traditional Chinese: 雲階
- Simplified Chinese: 云阶
Transcriptions
Standard Mandarin
- Hanyu Pinyin: Yúnjiē
- Wade–Giles: Yün-chieh

Cen Chunxuan (2 May 1861 – 27 April 1933), courtesy name Yunjie, was a Zhuang Chinese politician who lived in the late Qing dynasty and Republic of China.

== Early career ==
Cen was born in 1861 during the late Qing dynasty in Xilin, Guangxi. His father, Cen Yuying (岑毓英; 1829–1889), served as the Viceroy of Yunnan and Guizhou. He was very ill-behaved in his youth and was one of the "Three Notorious Youngsters in the Capital" (京城三惡少) alongside Ruicheng and Lao Ziqiao (勞子喬). In 1879, he first entered the civil service as a zhushi (主事). In 1885, he obtained the position of a juren (舉人) in the imperial examination and was appointed as a houren langzhong (候任郎中). When Cen Yuying died in 1889, the government took into consideration his service to the Qing Empire and decided to appoint Cen Chunxuan as a shaoqing (少卿; a fourth-grade official position) in the Taipusi (太僕寺), a government agency in charge of the imperial transport system.

In 1898, the Guangxu Emperor personally interviewed and tested Cen and was so impressed with his response that he made an exception by promoting Cen to the position of a buzhengshi (布政使; a second-grade official position) in Guangdong. While serving in Guangdong, Cen got into conflict with his superior, Tan Zhonglin, the Viceroy of Guangdong and Guangxi, hence he was reassigned to be a anchashi (按察使) in Gansu.

In 1900, when the forces of the Eight-Nation Alliance attacked Beijing to suppress the Boxer Rebellion, the Guangxu Emperor and Empress Dowager Cixi fled from the capital and headed towards Xi'an. Cen led military forces from Gansu to Xi'an to protect the emperor and empress dowager, and was awarded the Imperial Yellow Jacket and earned the favour of the Empress Dowager. He was promoted to the position of xunfu of Shaanxi but was later reassigned to be the xunfu of Shanxi. While in office, he set up the precursor of Shanxi University with the aid of the Welsh missionary Timothy Richard. In 1902, he was reassigned to be the xunfu of Guangdong. However, before he could assume office, he was ordered to go to Sichuan instead to replace Kuijun (奎俊) as the acting-Viceroy of Sichuan after the latter was dismissed from office for his failure to defeat Boxer rebels in Sichuan. While he was in Sichuan, he tightened and enforced government regulations strictly, set up a police force, and accused over 40 officials of corruption. He was nicknamed "Butcher of Officials" (官屠) – one of the "Three Butchers of the Late Qing Dynasty" (清末三屠) alongside "Butcher of Money" Zhang Zhidong and "Butcher of Scholars" Yuan Shikai.

== As the Viceroy of Guangdong and Guangxi ==
In 1903, Cen was appointed as the Viceroy of Guangdong and Guangxi. In the following two years, he wrote memorials to the Qing imperial court urging the Guangxu Emperor to establish a constitutional monarchy and abolish the imperial examination system. In 1906, he supported Zhang Jian and others in establishing a Shanghai-based society that advocated for the Qing Empire to be converted to a constitutional monarchy. He also sent his subordinate Zheng Xiaoxu to serve as the president of the society and became a prominent leader in the Constitutional Monarchy Movement (立憲運動).

As Cen had strong backing from Empress Dowager Cixi, he was direct in confronting corrupt officials and even wrote memorials to the imperial court to accuse them of corruption. There were two officials whom he dealt with that attracted particular attention: Pei Jingfu (裴景福) and Zhou Rongyao (周榮曜). In cracking down on corrupt officials, he offended Prince Qing, who supported the corrupt officials. He was also drawn into a political struggle when he allied with Qu Hongji, a Grand Councillor, against Prince Qing and Yuan Shikai.

== Political struggle of Dingwei ==
In 1906, using a rebellion in Pianma (片馬; in present-day Lushui County), Yunnan as an excuse, Prince Qing had Cen removed from his position as Viceroy of Guangdong and Guangxi and transferred to that of Viceroy of Yunnan and Guizhou. Cen refused to travel to Yunnan to assume his appointment, claimed that he was ill and needed to recuperate, and remained in Shanghai, where he continued to observe the situation quietly.

In early 1907, upon noticing that the odds were turning against Yuan Shikai, Cen seized the opportunity to travel to Beijing to meet Empress Dowager Cixi, who appointed him as the Minister of Posts and Communications and allowed him to remain in the capital. The balance of power thus shifted in favour of Cen and Qu Hongji. However, Prince Qing plotted against Cen and accused him of supporting Liang Qichao and trying to revive the Hundred Days' Reform, which was terminated by Empress Dowager Cixi and her faction. Cen fell out of the empress dowager's favour and was sent out of Beijing to be the Viceroy of Guangdong and Guangxi again. When he passed by Shanghai on his journey to Guangdong, he tried to delay assuming his appointment again by claiming that he was ill and needed to rest. However, Empress Dowager Cixi issued an order that dismissed Cen from office. The political struggle between Cen against Prince Qing and Yuan Shikai thus ended with a defeat for Cen.

The political struggle is known as the "political struggle of dingwei" (丁未黨爭) because it took place in the dingwei (丁未) year according to the Chinese calendar.

== Xinhai Revolution ==
On 15 September 1911, the imperial court sent an urgent order to Cen, who had been spending the past four years in Shanghai since his dismissal from office, ordering him to immediately leave Shanghai and join Zhao Erfeng in suppressing the anti-Qing rebellions. However, Cen sent a telegraph to the imperial court, suggesting that the Qing government take responsibility for its failure and become a constitutional monarchy to appease the rebels and preserve its existence. The imperial court was shocked and angered by Cen's suggestion. When Cen arrived in Wuchang, Hubei in late September, he met Ruicheng, discussed with him about the rebellion, and decided to resign from office upon learning that the Qing Empire was heading in a direction contrary to his personal ideals. The imperial court approved his resignation in early October. On the night of 9 October, when the Wuchang Uprising broke out, the rebels did not disturb Cen at all when they went around attacking Qing forces in Wuchang. On the morning of 10 October, Cen left Wuchang and travelled to Shanghai. On the way, he learnt that Li Yuanhong had been named the military leader of the rebels and the Xinhai Revolution was over.

== Life under the Republic of China ==
In 1913, when the Second Revolution broke out, Cen sent a telegraph from Shanghai to Yuan Shikai in Beijing, requesting that Yuan resolve his conflict with Sun Yat-sen and the revolutionaries in a peaceful manner, but Yuan ignored him. On 17 July 1913, the revolutionaries nominated Cen to be their grand marshal and issued a proclamation appointing him as the president of the Republic of China. After the failure of the Second Revolution, Cen became a fugitive when Yuan placed a price on his head, and was forced to flee from China to Southeast Asia.

The National Protection War broke out in 1915 when Yuan Shikai declared himself emperor and attempted to establish an Empire of China. Li Genyuan (李根源) sent a representative to Southeast Asia to invite Cen back to China to join the revolutionaries in their war against Yuan Shikai. On 4 January 1916, Cen returned to Shanghai, met Liang Qichao, and discussed with him how to deal with Yuan Shikai. He wrote letters to his former subordinates Lu Rongting and Long Jiguang, who were in control of Guangxi and Guangdong respectively, to declare independence from Yuan Shikai's regime. On 19 April 1916, Cen, along with Liang Qichao and Lu Rongting, met in Zhaoqing, Guangdong, where they established a National Protection Military Government. Cen was nominated to be commander-in-chief of the National Protection Army, with Liang Qichao as his chief of staff. Cen declared war against Yuan Shikai and proclaimed, "(...) If Yuan Shikai lives, I die; if Yuan Shikai dies, I live!"

In 1918, Cen became the leader of a military government in Guangzhou. Two years later, the military government was disbanded and was replaced by Sun's Nationalist government. Consequently, Cen announced his resignation in a telegraph and spent the rest of his life in retirement in Shanghai. He died in Shanghai on 27 April 1933.

== Relatives ==
- Tang Shaoyi: Tang's daughter is married to Cen's son, Cen Deguang.
- Cen Chunmin (1868 – 1944): Cen's younger brother.
- Yu Liqun: Cen's granddaughter. Chinese author, Guo Moruo's third wife.

Government offices
Preceded by Tao Mo	Viceroy of Liangguang; 1903–1906	Succeeded by Zhou Fu
