= Yuan Shuxun =

Chinese politician (1847–1915)

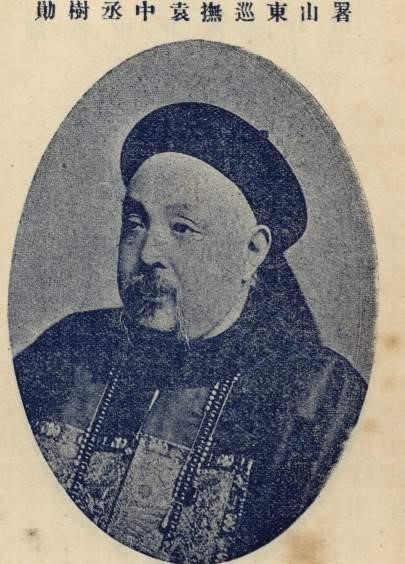
- Chinese: 袁樹勛
Transcriptions

Yuan Shuxun (1847–1915) was a Qing Dynasty official.

== Life ==
He was born in Xiangtan, Hunan Province. In 1877, he became magistrate for Gaochun County (now Gaochun District, Nanjing, Jiangsu Province). In 1882, he became magistrate for Tongshan County (now Tongshan District, Xuzhou, Jiangsu Province). He served as magistrate of Nanhui County (now Nanhui District) from 1886 and of Shanghai County (now Minhang District) in 1891 and 1892. In 1901, he served as acting circuit intendant of Shanghai. He was the Governor of Shandong province from 1908 to June 1909. He then served as viceroy of Liangguang.
