= 1920 in China =

- Decades: 1900s; 1910s; 1920s; 1930s; 1940s
- See also: Other events of 1920; History of China • Timeline • Years

Events in the year 1920 in China.

== Incumbents ==
- President: Xu Shichang
- Premier: Jin Yunpeng

== Events ==
- July 14–23 – Zhili–Anhui War
- December 16 – 1920 Haiyuan earthquake
- Second Guangdong–Guangxi War
- Alice Dollar incident
- Establishment of the Republic of China Air Force

== Births ==
- April 18 – Wang Zigan, papercutting artist (died 2000)
- May 3 – Xu Liangying, physicist (died 2013)
- August 20 – Jiang Zhuyun, revolutionary martyr (died 1949)
- September 30 – Eileen Chang, writer (died 1995)
- November 24 – Chao Kuang Piu, industrialist and philanthropist (died 2021)

== Deaths ==
- January 17 – Yang Changji, teacher, scholar and writer (born 1871)
- January 23 – Mao Yichang, farmer and grain merchant, father of Mao Zedong (born 1870)
- Li Ruiqing
- Li Chun
