= Pok Shau-fu =

Pok Shau-fu MLY
- 卜少夫

Member of the Legislative Yuan
- In office 1 February 1981 – 31 January 1987
- Constituency: District 2 (Hong Kong and Macau)

Personal details
- Born: 21 June 1909 Jiangsu, China
- Died: 4 November 2000 (aged 91) Wan Chai, Hong Kong
- Party: Kuomintang

Pok Shau-fu (Chinese: 卜少夫; 21 June 1909 – 4 November 2000) was a Chinese-born journalist and politician. He served in the Legislative Yuan from 1981 to 1987. He was a native of Jiangsu.

== Career ==
In the 1960s, Pok was the publisher of Newsdom, a magazine based in Hong Kong. He also served as a correspondent to the United Daily News. In 1968, Pok was awarded a Chia Hsin Award for journalism for reporting on the riots of the previous year. He was appointed to the Legislative Yuan as a representative of Hong Kong and Macau for the first time in 1980, and reappointed in 1983.

Shortly after the death of his wife in 1996, Pok was diagnosed with lung cancer. He and Liang Su-yung eulogized publisher Liu Shao-tang at Liu's funeral, held in Taipei in February 2000. Pok fell ill later that year and first sought treatment in France, and was later admitted to Ruttonjee Hospital in Hong Kong. On 3 November 2000, Pok removed himself from medical equipment and refused to eat or drink. He fell into a coma at 10:00 the next morning, and died soon after.
