= Xiliang (official) =

Qing Dynasty Governor

His Excellency Xiliang
- 錫良
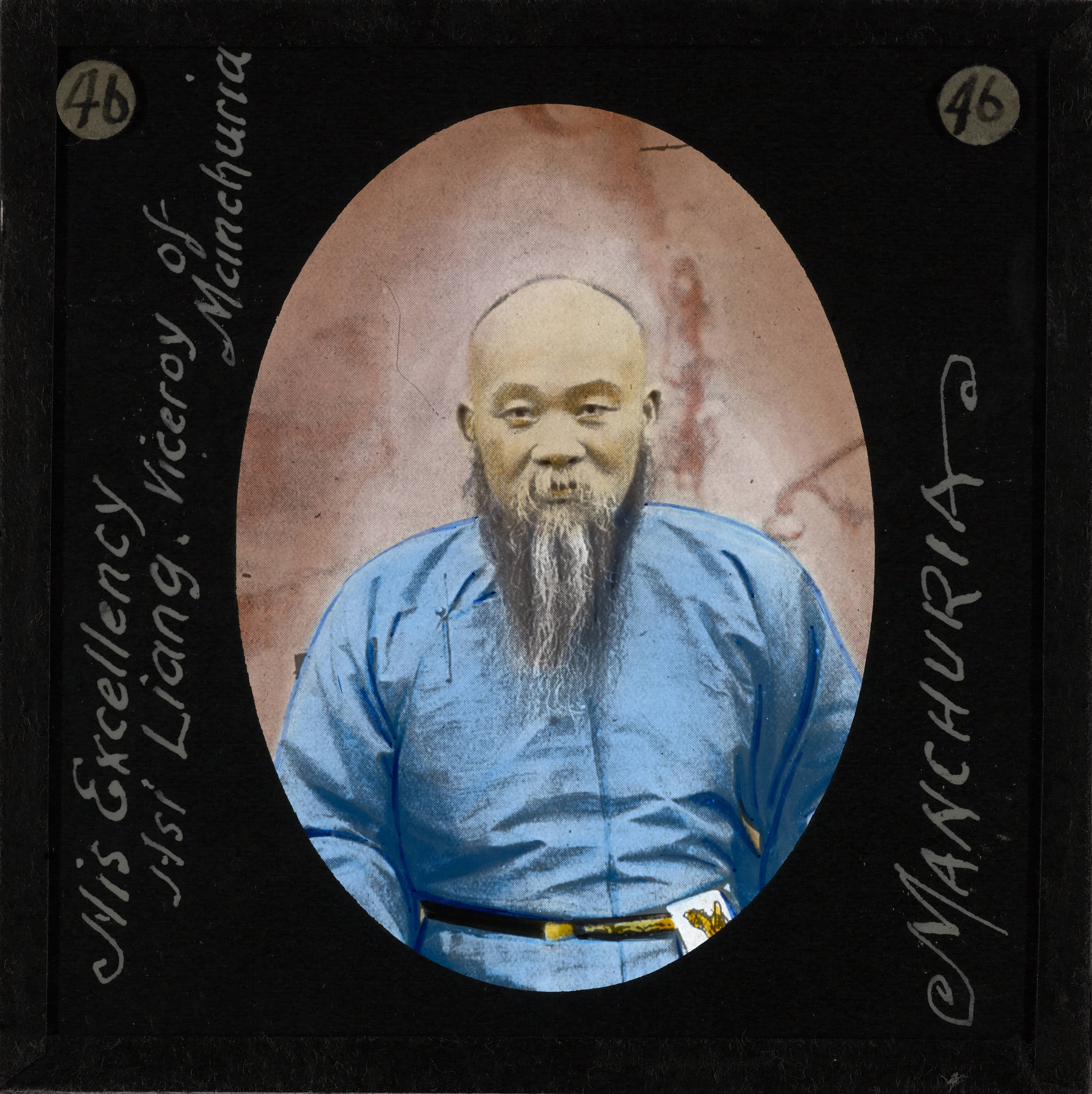
- Portrait of Xiliang as Viceroy of the Three Northeast Provinces

2nd Viceroy of the Three Northeast Provinces
- In office 9 February 1909 – 20 April 1911
- Monarch: Xuantong Emperor
- Preceded by: Xu Shichang
- Succeeded by: Zhao Erxun

90th Viceroy of Yun-Gui
- In office May 1907 – February 1909
- Monarchs: Guangxu Emperor; Xuantong Emperor
- Preceded by: Cen Chunxuan
- Succeeded by: Li Jingxi

93rd Viceroy of Sichuan
- In office April 1903 – May 1907
- Monarch: Guangxu Emperor
- Preceded by: Cen Chunxuan
- Succeeded by: Zhao Erfeng

Personal details
- Born: 1853 Outer Mongolia
- Died: 2 March 1918 (aged 64–65)

Military service
- Allegiance: Qing dynasty
- Branch/service: Imperial Chinese Army
- Years of service: 1894, 1900-1901

Xiliang (Note: Xiliang is his personal name. In Xiliang's time, most Manchu Bannerman did not use their family name.) (Chinese: 錫良; pinyin: Xīliáng; Wade–Giles: Hsi-liang; 1853 – 2 March 1918) was a Chinese official of Mongol heritage who served as the Viceroy of several provinces during the late Qing Dynasty. Xiliang was a Qing loyalist who supported moderate reforms and strongly opposed Western imperialism in China. He enthusiastically supported the Self-Strengthening Movement and the New Policies, but he opposed the spread of European culture and was sympathetic to the Boxer Rebellion. His efforts at reform saw mixed results. While generally praised by his superiors, Xiliang was also hampered by opposing factions in the Imperial Court and intervention by Western powers. His provincial administrations occasionally provoked popular unrest and accusations of corruption. During the final years of the Qing, Xiliang became an advocate of constitutional government. He ultimately failed to change Imperial policy in time to prevent the 1911 Revolution and retired from public life after the dynasty fell.

== Personal life and education ==
Although Xiliang's father was an official in the Bordered Blue Banner, he was raised in relative obscurity. By learning Chinese as well as his native Mongolian, he was able to achieve success through education in the Confucian classics. He was awarded the Jinshi in 1874 at the extremely young age of 21. Despite becoming the most prominent Mongol Bannerman in the Imperial administration during his career, he was heavily sinicized. His writings consistently reference Chinese cultural and historical themes and he was an enthusiastic patron of Chinese poetry.

== Career ==
Xiliang served in various roles in Shanxi from 1876 to 1894, during which time he gained a positive reputation for his handling of the Northern Chinese Famine and his energetic implementation of Governor Zhang Zhidong's Self-Strengthening reforms. He was transferred to Shandong in 1894 where he served in the military secretariat during the First Sino-Japanese War and later in various administrative posts, generally receiving strong praise from his superiors. China's defeat in the war, tension between peasants and Christian missionaries, and the German seizure of Jiaozhou Bay led Xiliang to develop nationalist and anti-foreign sentiments. He was also influenced in that direction by Shandong's Governor Li Bingheng, who would later commit suicide after being defeated by Western forces in the Boxer Rebellion. Nonetheless, Xiliang followed his Treaty obligations to protect missionaries and helped to capture and execute the remaining leaders of the anti-Christian Big Swords Society.

Xiliang aligned himself with Empress Dowager Cixi against Kang Youwei's reformers, who he saw as too extreme. By the time of the Boxer Rebellion Cixi had appointed Xiliang financial commissioner in Hunan. Xiliang was sympathetic to the Boxer's anti-foreign and anti-Christian positions. After Cixi requested support from the provinces, Viceroy Zhang Zhidong granted Xiliang permission to lead about 5,000 soldiers north to defend Beijing from the Eight-Nation Alliance. After helping serve as a rear-guard during Cixi's flight from Beijing, he was promoted to Governor of Shanxi. Xiliang's policy of militant resistance to Alfred von Waldersee's punitive expeditions originally won him Cixi's support, but he was eventually dismissed when he refused to back down after court policy changed. Through his British connections, Zhang Zhidong managed to pressure Cixi not to appoint Xiliang as Governor of Hubei.

In December 1901, Xiliang's political fortunes improved and he was sent to take up a position in Henan. Upon arrival he discovered that his post was a sinecure, and recommended that it be abolished as a waste of funds. His request was granted, and in appreciation Cixi soon promoted him to be Henan's Governor. In this role Xiliang made some progress towards rationalizing the bureaucracy and modernizing government services, but caused popular unrest by raising taxes to meet Henan's onerous contribution to China's indemnity payments.

In 1903, Xiliang was made Viceroy of Sichuan and tasked with implementing the "New Policies." In addition to some reforms in military and education, Xiliang's most ambitious project was constructing the Sichuan-Hankou Railway from Chengdu to Hankou (now Wuhan). A popular movement had begun among Sichuanese students that wanted to connect their province to the rest of China's rail network before the route could be monopolized by foreign interests. They sent a petition to Xiliang in 1904 proposing that he create a domestically controlled railroad company and promising to purchase shares. Xiliang accepted their proposal, and in 1905 the Sichuan-Hankou Railway. It was to be funded by selling shares to the public and a special 3% tax on harvests paid by landlords, who were also given share certificates. Foreigners could not buy shares, making it one of the first Chinese railroads to be entirely self-funded. In one way or another, much of the Sichuan gentry and merchant class became shareholders of the railway venture. By 1911, the company had raised 11,983,305 taels of silver of which 9,288,428 or 77.5% came from tax levies, 2,458,147 from public investments and 236,730 from government. The administrators Xiliang appointed proved to be corrupt, and mismanagement meant that construction efforts made little progress. In late 1906, Sichuanese merchants, supported by the students studying in Tokyo, demanded that they be allowed to take over management of the company. Xiliang responded by allowing shareholders to elect a board, but refused to allow them to replace the administrators he had appointed.

In May 1907, Xiliang was transferred to become Viceroy of Yun-Gui (the title being a contraction of the two provinces it oversaw, Yunnan and Guizhou). There he spent the majority of his term reforming the local military garrison and suppressing opium production (Yunnan was second only to Sichuan in opium production at the time, and it dominated the local economy). He oversaw construction of the Yunnan Military Academy, which was opened in 1909. In early 1908, Chinese revolutionary Sun Yat-sen launched a series of attacks into China from his base in French Indochina, hoping to gain a foothold in south China. After previous attempts in Guangxi and Guangdong were repulsed, Sun ordered a small group to attack Hekou, Yunnan. Xiliang was greatly alarmed when they managed to capture the town and kill the garrison commander, and he personally led a column of troops to drive the rebels out. After several weeks of fighting he succeeded, putting a final end to Sun's border-hopping strategy.

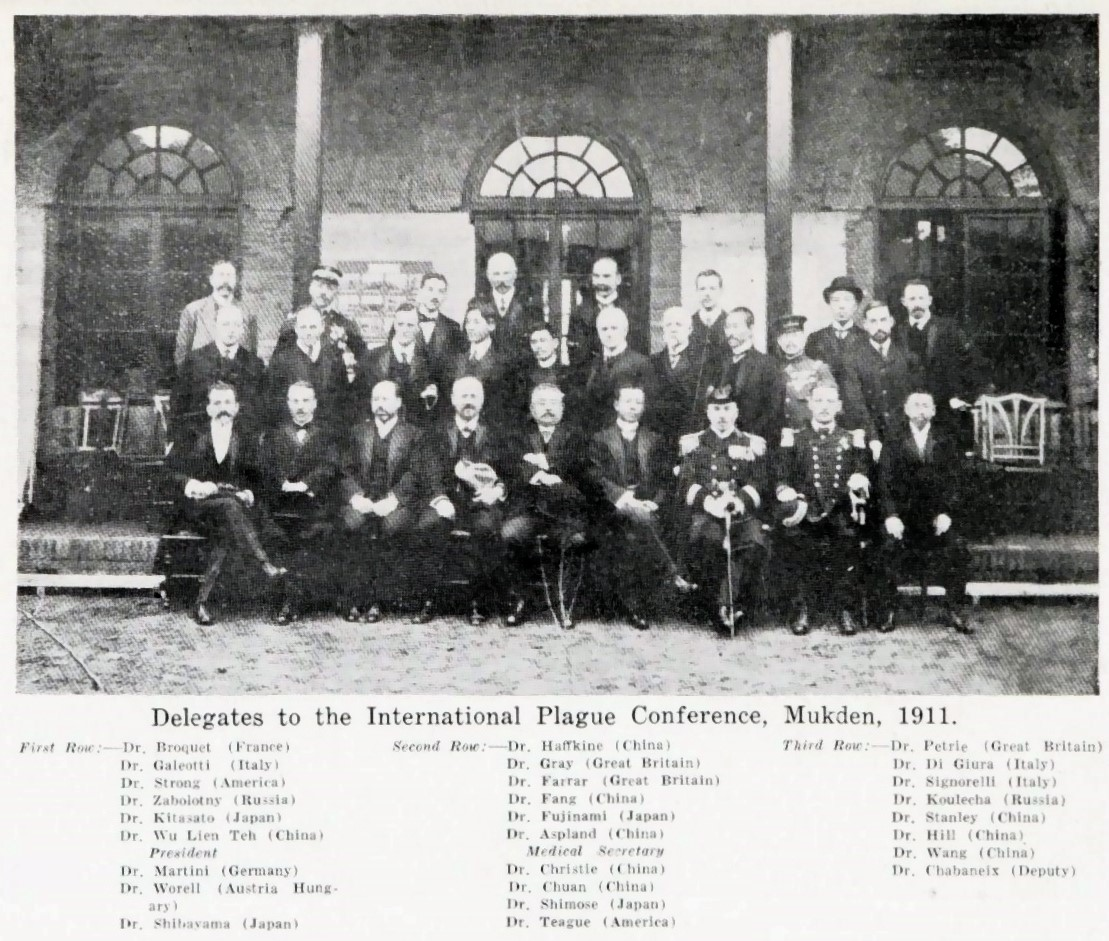
Photo of the delegates to the 1911 International Plague Conference in Mukden, hosted by Xiliang.

Impressed by his handling of the crisis, Emperor Puyi's regent Zaifeng promoted Xiliang to the more prestigious post of Viceroy of the Three Northeast Provinces in 1909. Japan's victory in the Russo-Japanese War had made Japanese imperialism by far the dominant issue facing Manchuria. In addition to diplomatic conflicts over concessions and the presence of thousands of Japanese troops in the South Manchuria Railway Zone, Japanese intervention in Korea had pushed numerous refugees across the border into Xiliang's new province. He attempted to take a hard diplomatic line against Japan and also to secure a loan from American financiers to build a non-Japanese railway, but was vetoed by Beijing in both cases. Xiliang's frustrations with Imperial policy led him to become increasingly reform-minded and sympathetic to popular discontent. In October 1910, he led 18 Governors and Viceroys in writing a telegram to the Court in support of the Advisory Council's call for a parliament and responsible cabinet. When Zaifeng continued to delay, Xiliang even allowed a delegation of eleven thousand protesters to go to Beijing and helped them write their petition. At this point, he was nearing sixty and making repeated requests to be allowed to retire. He was asked to remain to deal with one last crisis, an outbreak of pneumonic plague that swept Manchuria during the winter 1910–1911. Xiliang helped manage the investment of over one million Chinese dollars into public health infrastructure and hosted an International Plague Conference of epidemiologists considered "one of the first major international gatherings that visibly promoted a global perspective on human healthcare". Prominent Chinese physician Wu Lien-teh said of Xiliang and the other officials helping combat the plague, "no finer or more courteous types of gentlemen existed in China."

Following the end of the plague, Xiliang's retirement request was finally granted and he left office in April 1911. He was recalled by the Imperial Court in October for advice on how to deal with the Wuchang Uprising, but he finally returned home for good the same day that Puyi abdicated, February 12, 1912. He refused job offers from Yuan Shikai and offers of land from Zhang Zuolin, the latter of whom expressed deep admiration for Xiliang. He eschewed politics after his retirement. He died in 1917.

== Bibliography ==
- Meng, Xiangkun (2018). "Historical Origins of Military Sports in Yunnan Military Academy and Whampoa Military Academy" (PDF). 2nd International Conference on Innovations in Economic Management and Social Science.
- Wu, Yuzhang (2001). Recollections of the Revolution of 1911: A Great Democratic Revolution of China. Minerva Group.
- Gao, James Zheng (1997). Meeting Technology's Advance: Social Change in China and Zimbabwe in the Railway Age. Westport, CT: Greenwood Press. ISBN 9780313300950.
- Esherick, Joseph (1987). The Origins of the Boxer Uprising. Berkeley: University of California Press.
- Bays, Daniel H. (1978). China Enters the Twentieth Centruty: Chang Chih-tung and the issues of a new age, 1895-1909. Ann Arbor: University of Michigan.
- Wu, Yung (1936). Liu, K'un; Pruitt, Ida (eds.). The Flight of an Empress. New Haven: Yale University Press.
- Corsi, Michael (2017). "Identities in Crisis: Representations of Other and Self in Manchuria during the Plague Years of 1910–1911". World History Connected. 14 (3).
- Li, Chien-nung (1956). Tang, Ssu-yu; Ingalls, Jeremy (eds.). The Political History of China, 1840-1928. Princeton, NJ: D. Van Nord.
- Rhoads, Edward J. M. (2000). Manchus & Han: Ethnic Relations and Political Power in Late Qing and Early Republican China, 1861-1928. Seattle: University of Washington Press. ISBN 0-295-97938-0.
- Des Forges, Roger V. (1973). Hsi-Liang and the Chinese National Revolution. New Haven: Yale University Press. ISBN 0300016441.
- Brazelton, Mary Augusta (August 2020). "Viral Reflections: Placing China in Global Health Histories". J Asian Stud. 79 (3): 579–588. doi:10.1017/S0021911820002284. PMC 7556902. PMID 34191872.
- Zhao, Erxun (1928). Draft History of Qing (Qing Shi Gao) (in Chinese). Vol. 197–199.

Government offices
Preceded by Xu Shichang	Viceroy of the Three Northeast Provinces; 1909–1911	Succeeded by Zhao Erxun
Preceded by Cen Chunxuan	Viceroy of Yun-Gui; 1907–1909	Succeeded by Li Jingxi
Preceded by Cen Chunxuan	Viceroy of Sichuan; 1903–1907	Succeeded by Zhao Erfeng
