= Li Jingxi =

Qing Dynasty and Republic of China statesman

- 李經羲
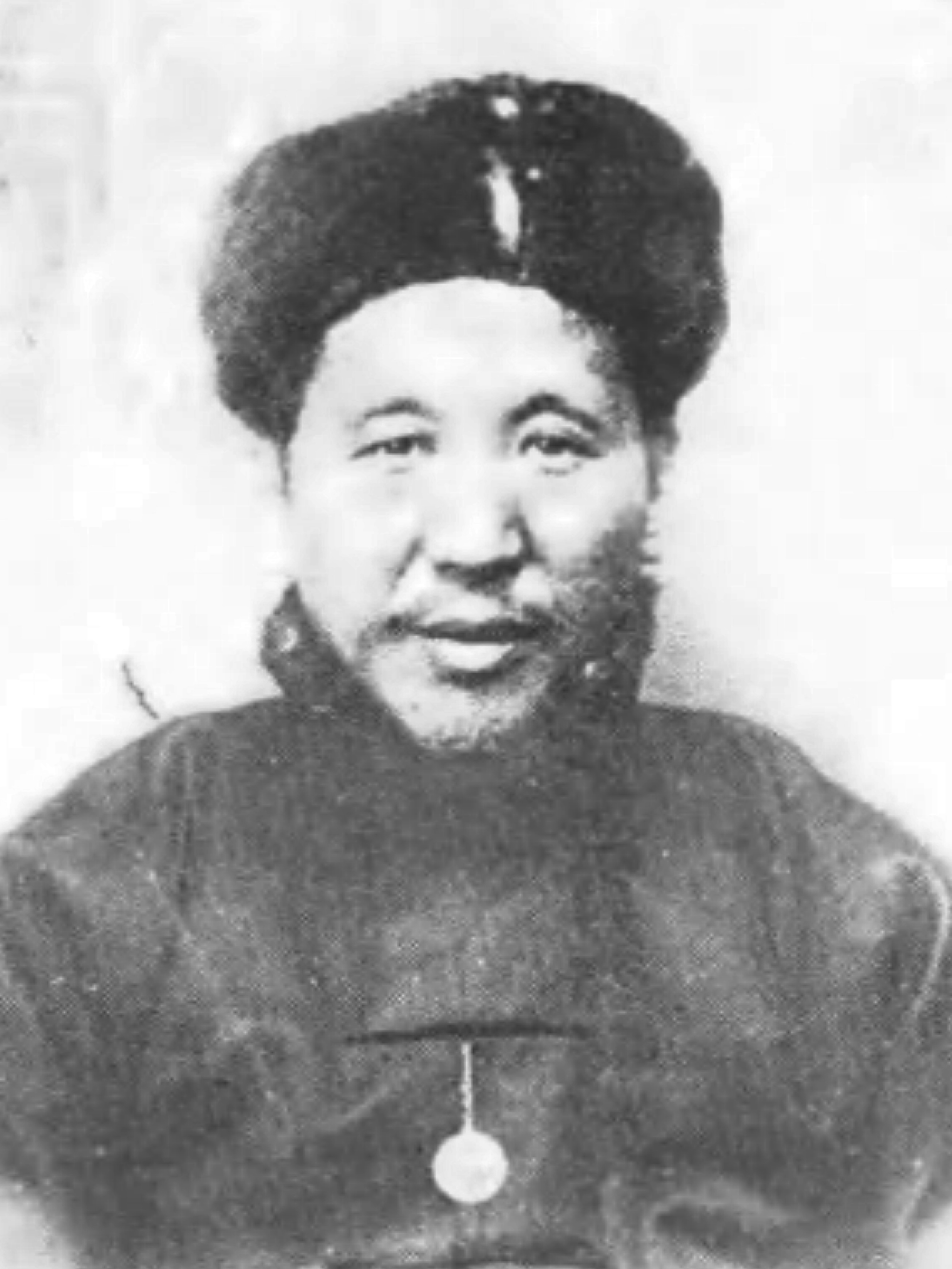

Premier of China
- In office 28 May 1917 – 1 July 1917
- President: Li Yuanhong
- Preceded by: Wu Tingfang
- Succeeded by: Duan Qirui

Minister of Finance
- In office May – 1 July 1917
- Premier: himself
- Preceded by: Li Sihao
- Succeeded by: Liang Qichao

Viceroy of Yun-Gui
- In office 9 February 1909 – 31 October 1911
- Preceded by: Xiliang
- Succeeded by: position abolished

Governor of Guangxi
- In office 30 May 1904 – 9 October 1905
- Preceded by: Ke Fengshi
- Succeeded by: Lin Shaonian
- In office 21 April – 21 May 1901
- Preceded by: Yu Yinlin
- Succeeded by: Ding Zhenduo

Governor of Guizhou
- In office 1902–1904
- Preceded by: Deng Huaxi
- Succeeded by: Cao Hongxun

Governor of Yunnan
- In office 1901–1902
- Preceded by: Ding Zhenduo
- Succeeded by: Lin Shaonian

Personal details
- Born: 1857 Hefei, Anhui
- Died: 18 September 1925 (aged 67–68) Shanghai
- Party: Progressive
- Relations: Li Hongzhang (uncle)

Li Jingxi (Chinese: 李經羲; pinyin: Li Jīngxī; Wade–Giles: Li Ching-hsi; 1857–18 September 1925) was a politician in the Qing Dynasty and Republic of China. He was born in Anhui and was the nephew of Li Hongzhang. He was the Premier of China in May–July 1917. During the Qing Dynasty, he was the last viceroy of Yun-Gui from 1909 to 1911.
