= Zhang Zhidong =

Chinese official and reformer (1837–1909)

- 張之洞
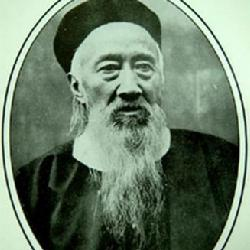

Grand Councillor
- In office 1907–1909

Grand Secretary of the Tiren Hall
- In office 1907–1909

Assistant Grand Secretary
- In office 1907–1907

Viceroy of Huguang
- In office 1904–1907
- Preceded by: Duanfang (acting)
- Succeeded by: Zhao Erxun
- In office 1898–1902
- Preceded by: Tang Jixun (acting)
- Succeeded by: Duanfang (acting)
- In office 1896–1898
- Preceded by: Tang Jixun (acting)
- Succeeded by: Tang Jixun (acting)

Viceroy of Liangjiang
- In office 1902 – 1903 (acting)
- Preceded by: Liu Kunyi
- Succeeded by: Wei Guangtao
- In office 1894–1896
- Preceded by: Liu Kunyi (acting)
- Succeeded by: Liu Kunyi (acting)

Viceroy of Liangguang
- In office 1884–1889
- Preceded by: Zhang Shusheng
- Succeeded by: Li Hanzhang

Personal details
- Born: 2 September 1837 Xingyi Prefecture, Guizhou Province, Qing Empire
- Died: October 4, 1909 (aged 72) Beijing, Qing Empire
- Relations: Zhang Zhiwan (cousin); Zhang Yanqing (son); Zhang Renli (son)
- Children: 10
- Occupation: Politician
- Known for: Founder of the Hanyang Arsenal

Zhang Zhidong
- Traditional Chinese: 張之洞
- Simplified Chinese: 张之洞
Transcriptions
Standard Mandarin
- Hanyu Pinyin: Zhāng Zhīdòng
- Wade–Giles: Chang^{1} Chih^{1}-tung^{4}
- IPA: [ʈʂáŋ ʈʂɻ̩́.tʊ̂ŋ]
Yue: Cantonese
- Jyutping: Zoeng^{1} Zi^{1}-dung^{6}

Zhang Zhidong (Chinese: 張之洞) (2 September 1837 – 4 October 1909) was a Chinese politician who lived during the late Qing dynasty. Along with Zeng Guofan, Li Hongzhang and Zuo Zongtang, Zhang Zhidong was one of the four most famous officials of the late Qing dynasty. Known for advocating controlled reform and modernization of Chinese troops, he served as the governor of Shanxi Province and viceroy of Huguang, Liangguang and Liangjiang, and also as a member of the Grand Council. He took a leading role in the abolition of the Imperial examination system in 1905.

== Other names ==
Zhang Zhidong was also known by other names. An older Wade–Giles form was Chang Chih-tung. His courtesy name was Xiaoda (孝達; 孝达; Xiàodá) or Xiangtao (香濤; 香涛; Xiāngtāo). His pseudonyms were Xiangyan (香岩; Xiāngyán), Hugong (壺公; 壶公; Húgōng), Wujing Jushi (無競居士; 无竞居士; Wújìng Jūshì) and Baobing (抱冰; Bàobīng). The posthumous name given to him by the Qing government was Wenxiang (文襄; Wénxiāng).

== Early life ==
Zhang was born in Xingyi Prefecture (興義府), Guizhou Province, but his ancestral roots were in Nanpi, Tianjin, Zhili Province. He was the cousin of Zhang Zhiwan. In 1852, he sat for the provincial-level imperial examination in Shuntian Prefecture (present-day Beijing) and achieved the top position as jieyuan (解元) in the juren class. In 1863, he sat for the palace-level examination and emerged as tanhua (探花), the third highest-ranked candidate of the jinshi class. He was then admitted to the Hanlin Academy as a bianxiu (編修; editor) before taking up other positions, including jiaoxi (教習), shidu (侍讀) and shijiang (侍講). In 1882, he was transferred as the xunfu (provincial governor) of Shanxi Province. Empress Dowager Cixi promoted him to Viceroy of Huguang in August 1889.

During the Dungan Revolt of 1862–1877, the Russian Empire occupied the Ili region in Xinjiang. After Qing imperial forces successfully crushed the Dungan Revolt, they demanded that the Russians withdraw from Ili, which led to the Ili Crisis.

After the incompetent negotiator Chonghou, who was bribed by the Russians, without permission from the Qing government, signed a treaty granting Russia extraterritorial rights, consulates, control over trade, and an indemnity, a massive uproar by the Chinese literati ensued, some of them calling for Chonghou's death. Zhang demanded for Chonghou's execution and urged the Qing government to stand up to Russia and declare the treaty invalid. He said, "The Russians must be considered extremely covetous and truculent in making the demands and Chonghou extremely stupid and absurd in accepting them... If we insist on changing the treaty, there may not be trouble; if we do not, we are unworthy to be called a state." The Chinese literati demanded the Qing government mobilize their armed forces against the Russians. The Qing government allocated important posts to officers from the Xiang Army, while British military officer Charles George Gordon advised the Chinese.

== First Sino-Japanese War ==
Zhang became involved in the First Sino-Japanese War, although not on the frontline. He initially advocated foreign aid from European forces near Tianjin in fighting the Japanese. In October 1894, he telegraphed Li Hongzhang, the Viceroy of Zhili, proposing the purchase of naval equipment, and loans from foreign banks. He further advocated this, and in addition the purchase of arms, alliance with European powers, and the "clear division of rewards and punishments" for troops, once the Japanese crossed the Yalu River into China in late October, threatening the northeastern provinces. In early 1895, the Japanese had begun an assault on Shandong, and Zhang telegraphed the governor Li Bingheng in an emergency that suggested fast civil recruitments, the building of strong forts, and the use of landmines, to prevent further Japanese advance. He had also sent arms and munitions to aid the campaign.

== Taiwan ==
Zhang held on a strong opinion on the issue of ceding Taiwan to the Japanese, per the 1895 Treaty of Shimonoseki that ended the First Sino-Japanese War. In late February 1895, he made his stance clear to the Qing government, and even offered ideas on how to prevent the loss of Taiwan. He suggested that they take huge loans from the British, who would in turn send their navy to defend Taiwan from the Japanese. In addition, he proposed giving mining rights to the British on Taiwan for about 10 to 20 years. In May 1895, the Qing government ordered all civil and military officials to evacuate Taiwan. Zhang also refused to provide aid to the remaining Qing forces in Taiwan, especially after the fall of Keelung and with Taipei as the sole remaining Qing stronghold in Taiwan. On 19 October 1895, the last of the Qing forces in Taiwan, led by Liu Yongfu, withdrew to Xiamen.

== Modernization of China's military ==
After China's defeat in the Sino-French War in 1885, Zhang was said to reflect on the events of the war and expressed his desire to establish a modern military to match up to that of the Western forces in a memorial to the throne. Upon Zhang's reflection, the weaknesses of traditional Chinese troops were identified in comparison with the Western troops, which had better firepower, mobility, and individual combat capability. When Zhang created the Guangdong Military Academy, also known as Guangdong Naval and Military Officers Academy, and the Guangdong Victorious Army (廣勝軍), he set physical admission standards high and hired German officers as instructors to address the weaknesses of the Chinese troops. Specifically, in modernizing the troops in Guangdong, Zhang made newly trained troops to be "the nucleus" of newer troops, passing the training unit to unit. In addition, Zhang synthesized Chinese traditional learning and Western military learning in Guangdong Military Academy under his guiding principle of tiyong (體用), which stresses Chinese traditional values and deems Western imports to be for practical uses only. Seeking to industrialize for the sake of China's defense, he ordered an iron-and-steel smelting plant from England. This came with issues as Zhang was not intimately familiar with the processes of metallurgy; Zhang was not previously aware of the availability of ores for said plant, nor was the plant located near a coal-mining area. The plant began production in 1894. The losses stemming from the misstep were substantial, leading to some political ridicule. Zhang also established the Hubei Military Academy (湖北學堂) in 1896, where he employed instructors from the Guangdong Academy. The majority of the staff were Chinese. He also hired some German officers as instructors.

While serving as the governor of Nanjing in 1894, Zhang invited a German training regiment of 12 officers and 24 warrant officers to train the local garrison into a modern military force. In 1896, acting under an imperial decree, Zhang moved to Wuchang to serve as the Viceroy of Huguang, an area comprising Hubei and Hunan provinces. Zhang drew on his experience in Nanjing to modernize the military forces under his command in Huguang. He additionally proposed construction of a railway from Hankou to near Beijing, of which he was appointed in charge of. The railway was not completed until 1906. Further advocating for the industrialization of China, he founded a mint, tanneries, tile and silk factories, as well as paper, cotton, and woolen mills, among other industries.

In Wuchang, Zhang effectively trained and equipped modern units of sappers, engineers, cavalry, police, artillery and infantry. Of the 60,000 men under his command, 20,000 men were directly trained by foreign officers, and a military academy was established in Wuchang in order to train future generations of soldiers. Zhang armed the troops with German Mauser rifles and other modern equipment. Foreign observers reported that, when their training was complete, the troops stationed in the Wuchang garrison were the equal of contemporary European forces.

During the Boxer Rebellion, Zhang, along with some other regional governors who commanded substantial modernized armies, refused to participate in the central government's declaration of war against the Eight-Nation Alliance. Zhang assured the foreigners during negotiations that he would do nothing to help the central government. He told this to Everard Fraser. This clique was known as The Mutual Protection of Southeast China.

Zhang's troops later became involved in politics. In 1911, the Wuchang garrison led the Wuchang Uprising, a coup against the local government that catalyzed the nationwide Xinhai Revolution. The Xinhai Revolution led to the collapse of the Qing dynasty and its replacement by the Republic of China.

== Involvement in reform ==
Zhang called for the adoption of Western ideas and technologies to strengthen China. Zhang said that while importing Western technology, China should keep its ethical, social, and political systems. He supported the principle of "Chinese knowledge as the foundation, Western knowledge for practical application."

Zhang Zhidong's reformist faction in the late Qing court was extremely influential. Yang Rui, one of the Six Martyrs, was Zhang's political informant in Beijing who carried out Zhang's instructions during Hundred Days' Reform of 1898. Chen Baozhen is another subordinate who shared Zhang's academic visions, and Chen coauthored a memorial to the court with Zhang to suggest the reform of Civil Service Exam. Zhang had a strong grasp of the progress of reforms as he had more temporary confidants and informants from other regions.

In the third month of 1898, Zhang published his work Exhortation to Study (勸學篇), which addresses the questions of educational reform. He insisted on a method of relatively conservative reform, summarized in his phrase "Chinese Learning as Substance, Western Learning for Application" (中學為體，西學為用). In Exhortation to Study (勸學篇), Zhang brought up reform methodology of implementing new schools at the expense of Buddhist and Taoist monasteries. While doing so, reservation of 30 percent of the monasteries and introduction of Confucianization were also part of the methodology to help the two religions subsist. Zhang Zhidong's reform on education is said not to eliminate religious institutions, but to better allocate resources.

Kang Youwei, another late Qing reformist, later expressed similar mode of thinking - he also advocated aiding modern education at the cost of temples. However, Kang Youwei is more radical as he envisions destruction of religions in comparison to Zhang's conservative approach. Zhang was supportive of Kang's vision of scholarly learning, but rejects Kang's proposal of Confucian religion. Historians commonly regard Zhang Zhidong's reform as an attempt to reconcile modernity and China's existing social fabric.

He succeeded Liu Kunyi as Viceroy of Liangjiang in 1901, and moved to Nanjing, where he laid the foundations for the modern University of Nanjing. Zhang Zhidong, along with Liu Kunyi and Wei Guangtao, were the founders of Sanjiang Normal College. Zhang espoused Japanese educational system and principles, and announced his plan to hire 12 Japanese teachers(教习) in a communication with Moriyoshi Nagaoka (長岡護美) before the establishment of the college.

== Later life ==
In 1900, he advocated the suppression of the Boxer Rebellion. When the Eight-Nation Alliance entered Beijing, Zhang, along with Li Hongzhang and others, participated in The Mutual Protection of Southeast China. He quelled local revolts and defeated the rebel army of Tang Caichang. He was appointed the Minister of Military Affairs in 1906, and worked in Beijing for the central government.

He was aware that a change in Chinese affairs was necessary, and at the same time realized that the Chinese officials and people clung with unyielding tenacity to their traditional ideas and institutions and penned his ideas in a book: China's only hope: An Appeal. The book was distributed to the Grand Council of State, Viceroys, Governors and Literary Examiners of China.

Zhang Zhidong had 13 sons, including Zhang Yanqing and Zhang Renli. Zhang Houcan, a Chinese psychologist, is his granddaughter.

Zhang died of illness in 1909 in Beijing at the age of 72. He was given the posthumous title Wenxiang (文襄). The Red Guards destroyed his tomb in 1966 during the Cultural Revolution. His remains were rediscovered in 2007 and reburied.

Government offices
Preceded by Zhang Shusheng	Viceroy of Liangguang; 1884-1889	Succeeded by Li Hanzhang
Preceded by Yulu	Viceroy of Huguang; 1889-1894	Succeeded by Tan Jixun
Preceded by Liu Kunyi	Viceroy of Liangjiang; 1894-1895	Succeeded by Liu Kunyi
Preceded by Tan Jixun	Viceroy of Huguang; 1896-1902	Succeeded by Duanfang
Preceded by Liu Kunyi	Viceroy of Liangjiang; 1902-1903	Succeeded by Wei Guangtao
Preceded by Duanfang	Viceroy of Huguang; 1904-1907	Succeeded by Zhao Erxun
