= Chen Kuilong =

Chinese politician (1857–1948)

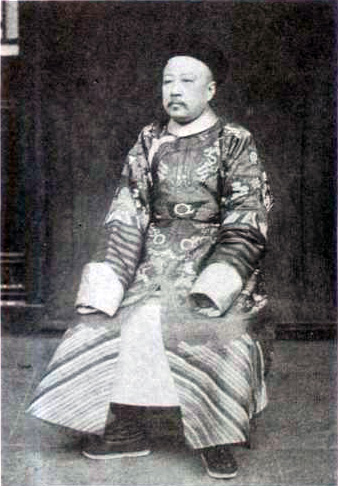

Minister for Advice
- In office July 1 – July 12, 1917 Serving with Zhao Erxun, Zhang Yinglin, Feng Xu
- Prime Minister: Zhang Xun

Viceroy of Zhili
- In office January 23, 1910 – February 3, 1912
- Preceded by: Cui Yong'an (acting)
- Succeeded by: Zhang Zhenfang (acting)

Viceroy of Huguang
- In office March 1908 – October 1909
- Preceded by: Zhao Erxun
- Succeeded by: Ruicheng (acting)

Viceroy of Sichuan
- In office September 5, 1907 – March 6, 1908
- Preceded by: Zhao Erxun
- Succeeded by: Zhao Erxun

Governor of Jiangsu
- In office 1906–1907
- Preceded by: Lu Yuanding
- Succeeded by: Zhang Cengyang

Governor of Henan
- In office 1903–1906
- Preceded by: Zhang Renjun
- Succeeded by: Ruiliang

Viceroy of Rivers and Waterways
- In office 1901–1903
- Preceded by: Enshou
- Succeeded by: Deshou

Personal details
- Born: 1857 Guiyang, Guizhou, Qing Empire
- Died: 1948 (aged 90–91) Shanghai, Republic of China

Chen Kuilong (陳夔龍) (1857–1948) was a Qing dynasty official. He also Viceroy of Sichuan from 1907 to 1908 and Viceroy of Huguang from March 1908 to October 1909. Then he was the penultimate Viceroy of Zhili serving from January 23, 1910, to February 3, 1912, when he left office due to illness.
