= Nanpi County =

Nanpi County 南皮县
- County
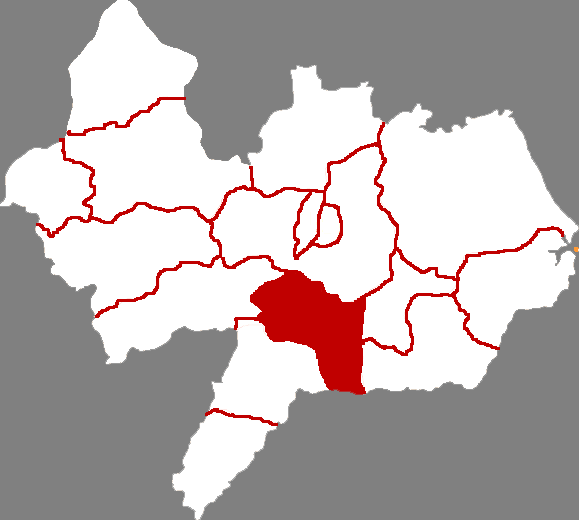
- Nanpi in Cangzhou

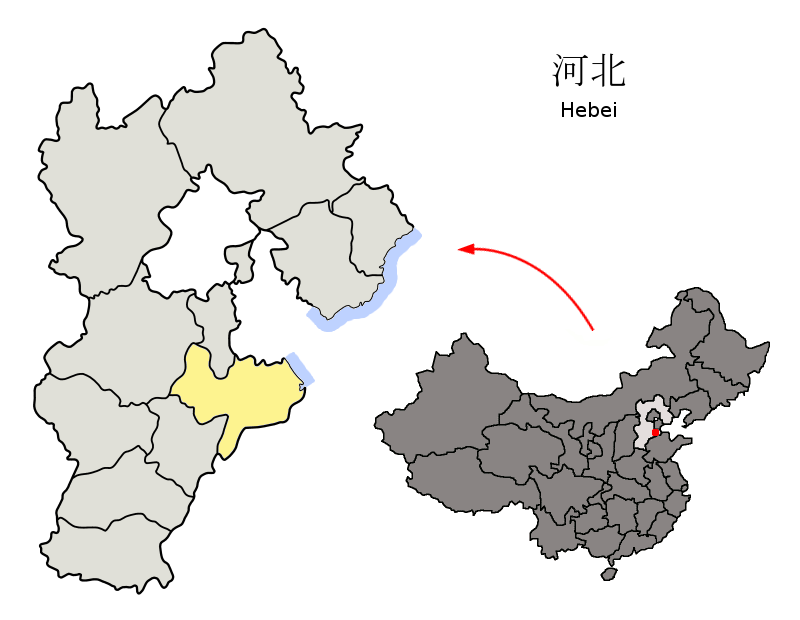
- Cangzhou in Hebei
- Coordinates: 38°02′20″N 116°42′29″E
- Country: People's Republic of China
- Province: Hebei
- Prefecture-level city: Cangzhou

Area
  - Total: 836 km^{2} (323 sq mi)
- Elevation: 11 m (36 ft)

Population (2020)
  - Total: 347,473
  - Density: 416/km^{2} (1,080/sq mi)
- Time zone: UTC+8 (China Standard)
- Postal code: 061500
- Area code: 0317

Nanpi (Chinese: 南皮; pinyin: Nánpí) is a county in the east of Hebei province, China, bordering Shandong province to the south. It is under the administration of the prefecture-level city of Cangzhou. As of 2020, it has a population of around 350,000 residing in an area of 836 km^{2} (323 sq mi).

== Administrative divisions ==
There are 6 towns and 3 townships under the county's administration.

Towns:

- Nanpi (南皮镇), Fengjiakou (冯家口镇), Zhaizi (寨子镇), Baoguantun (鲍官屯镇), Wangsi (王寺镇), Wumaying (乌马营镇)

Townships:

- Dalangdian Township (大浪淀乡), Liubali Township (刘八里乡), Luguan Township (潞灌乡)

== History ==
Nanpi in the history has been pretty famous due to its mention in the epic novel "Heroes in the marsh" (水滸傳) in Ming Dynasty. At that time the town was named Da Ming Fu and featured in the novel Water Margin (大名府).

It is also the home town of an important figure in late Qing Dynasty: Zhang ZhiDong (張之洞), who has been a governor to Hunan, Hubei, etc.

== Climate ==
Climate data for Nanpi, elevation 11 m (36 ft), (1991–2020 normals, extremes 1981–present)
Month	Jan	Feb	Mar	Apr	May	Jun	Jul	Aug	Sep	Oct	Nov	Dec	Year
Record high °C (°F)	16.2 (61.2)	22.3 (72.1)	30.5 (86.9)	32.5 (90.5)	40.0 (104.0)	40.9 (105.6)	41.7 (107.1)	37.4 (99.3)	35.7 (96.3)	31.8 (89.2)	24.9 (76.8)	17.7 (63.9)	41.7 (107.1)
Mean daily maximum °C (°F)	3.1 (37.6)	7.2 (45.0)	14.0 (57.2)	21.3 (70.3)	27.3 (81.1)	31.9 (89.4)	32.2 (90.0)	30.6 (87.1)	27.1 (80.8)	20.7 (69.3)	11.7 (53.1)	4.6 (40.3)	19.3 (66.8)
Daily mean °C (°F)	−2.8 (27.0)	0.9 (33.6)	7.4 (45.3)	14.6 (58.3)	20.8 (69.4)	25.7 (78.3)	27.3 (81.1)	25.8 (78.4)	21.1 (70.0)	14.2 (57.6)	5.8 (42.4)	−0.9 (30.4)	13.3 (56.0)
Mean daily minimum °C (°F)	−7.1 (19.2)	−3.8 (25.2)	2.0 (35.6)	8.7 (47.7)	14.7 (58.5)	19.9 (67.8)	22.9 (73.2)	21.7 (71.1)	16.2 (61.2)	9.1 (48.4)	1.4 (34.5)	−4.9 (23.2)	8.4 (47.1)
Record low °C (°F)	−18.5 (−1.3)	−17.5 (0.5)	−10.4 (13.3)	−3.2 (26.2)	4.4 (39.9)	9.0 (48.2)	16.2 (61.2)	13.4 (56.1)	3.5 (38.3)	−3.6 (25.5)	−14.7 (5.5)	−21.0 (−5.8)	−21.0 (−5.8)
Average precipitation mm (inches)	2.7 (0.11)	8.5 (0.33)	8.9 (0.35)	24.3 (0.96)	33.6 (1.32)	72.1 (2.84)	186.8 (7.35)	138.3 (5.44)	34.8 (1.37)	33.0 (1.30)	15.0 (0.59)	3.6 (0.14)	561.6 (22.1)
Average precipitation days (≥ 0.1 mm)	1.7	2.7	2.6	5.1	5.9	8.6	10.7	9.5	5.6	5.0	4.0	2.4	63.8
Average snowy days	2.4	2.7	1.0	0.2	0	0	0	0	0	0	1.1	1.7	9.1
Average relative humidity (%)	58	55	51	55	58	60	75	79	72	66	66	62	63
Mean monthly sunshine hours	183.2	185.7	241.3	250.9	281.1	246.0	215.8	212.7	214.2	207.6	171.1	169.6	2,579.2
Percentage possible sunshine	60	61	65	63	64	56	48	51	58	61	57	58	59
Source: China Meteorological Administration
