= Zhao Erxun =

Qing dynasty politician and historian (1844–1927)

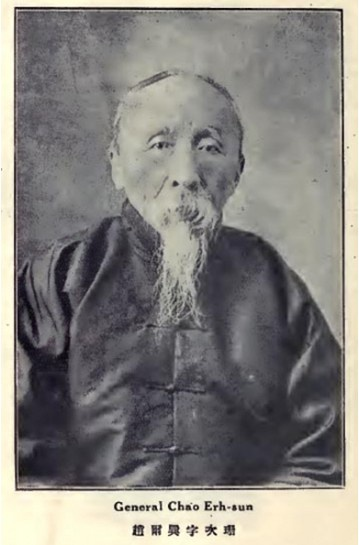

President of the Provisional National Council
- In office 30 July 1925 – 9 April 1926
- Prime Minister: Duan Qirui
- Deputy: Tang Yi
- Preceded by: position created
- Succeeded by: Li Yuanhong (as President of the National Council)

Minister for Advice
- In office 1 July – 12 July 1917 Serving with Chen Kuilong, Zhang Yinglin, Feng Xu
- Prime Minister: Zhang Xun

Viceroy of the Three Northeast Provinces
- In office 20 April 1911 – 12 February 1912
- Preceded by: Xiliang

Viceroy of Sichuan
- In office March 1908 – April 1911
- Preceded by: Chen Kuilong
- Succeeded by: Zhao Erfeng
- In office March 1907 – August 1907
- Preceded by: Xiliang
- Succeeded by: Zhao Erfeng

Viceroy of Huguang
- In office August 1907 – March 1908
- Preceded by: Zhang Zhidong
- Succeeded by: Chen Kuilong

Minister of Revenue
- In office 14 August 1904 – 7 May 1905 Serving with Rongqing
- Preceded by: Lu Chuanlin
- Succeeded by: Zhang Baixi

Governor of Hunan
- In office January 1903 – May 1904
- Preceded by: Yu Liansan
- Succeeded by: Lu Yuanding

Personal details
- Born: 23 May 1844
- Died: 3 September 1927 (aged 83) Beijing, Republic of China
- Relations: Zhao Erfeng (brother)
- Education: jinshi degree in the 1874 imperial examination

Zhao Erxun
- Traditional Chinese: 趙爾巽
- Simplified Chinese: 赵尔巽
Transcriptions
Standard Mandarin
- Hanyu Pinyin: Zhào Ěrxùn
- Wade–Giles: Chao Erh-hsün

Cishan (courtesy name)
- Chinese: 次珊
Transcriptions
Standard Mandarin
- Hanyu Pinyin: Cìshān

Wubu (pseudonym)
- Traditional Chinese: 無補
- Simplified Chinese: 无补
Transcriptions
Standard Mandarin
- Hanyu Pinyin: Wúbǔ

Zhao Erxun (23 May 1844 – 3 September 1927), courtesy name Cishan, art name Wubu, was a Chinese political and military officeholder who lived in the late Qing dynasty and early Republic of China. He served in numerous high-ranking positions under the Qing government, including Viceroy of Sichuan, Viceroy of Huguang, and Viceroy of the Three Northeast Provinces. After the fall of the Qing dynasty, he became a historian and was the lead editor of the Draft History of Qing (Qing Shi Gao).

== Life ==
=== Early career ===
Zhao's ancestral roots were in Tieling, Fengtian Province (present-day Liaoning Province). His family was under the Plain Blue Banner of the Han Chinese Eight Banners. He sat for the provincial-level imperial examination in 1867 and obtained the position of a juren. In 1874, he sat for the palace-level examination and emerged as a jinshi, after which he was admitted to the Hanlin Academy as a bianxiu (編修; compiler and editor).

The first position Zhao held was an assistant examiner for the provincial-level imperial examination in Hubei Province. Later, he was promoted to a Supervising Censor of the Ministry of Works. In 1893, he served as a prefect in Guizhou Province and was promoted to a daotai (道台; a type of military official). He was transferred to Guangdong Province later. He subsequently served as the anchashi (按察使; Provincial Judicial Commissioner) in Anhui and Shaanxi provinces, and later as the buzhengshi (布政使; Provincial Financial Commissioner) of Gansu, Shanxi and Xinjiang provinces.

In November 1902, Zhao was appointed as the xunfu (Provincial Governor) of Shanxi Province. A year later, he was made acting xunfu of Hunan Province. In August 1904, he was recalled to the imperial capital, Beijing, to serve as acting Secretary of Revenue. One year later, he was sent to Fengtian Province to serve as "General of Shengjing" (盛京將軍).

=== Activities in Tibet and as Viceroy of Sichuan and the Three Northeast Provinces ===
In March 1907, Zhao replaced Xiliang as the Viceroy of Sichuan but never assumed office. His brother, Zhao Erfeng, succeeded him as the Viceroy of Sichuan. Around August, when Zhang Zhidong was recalled to Beijing to serve on the Grand Council, Zhao was appointed as Viceroy of Huguang to replace Zhang. He was also given the honorary appointments of Secretary of Defence and Censor-in-Chief. During his tenure as Viceroy of Huguang, he set up the Hubei Law School (湖北法政學堂).

Zhao and his brother Zhao Erfeng extended Qing rule into Eastern Tibet (Kham) and sent an army to Lhasa in 1908. This initially worked with the restored 13th Dalai Lama but later drove him out after strong disagreements about a conflict between Lamas in Eastern Tibet and the Qing government in Sichuan. It has been suggested that this conflict, along with an increase in taxes, caused the September 1911 rebellion in Sichuan. Han Suyin takes a different view and says that the main issue in the conflict was control over a planned railway that would have linked Sichuan to the rest of China.

In March 1908, Zhao was reassigned to serve as the Viceroy of Sichuan again. Around April 1911, he was transferred to Manchuria to serve as the Viceroy of the Three Northeast Provinces (or Viceroy of Manchuria) and awarded an honorary title as an Imperial Commissioner. During his tenure, he established the Fengtian Military School (奉天講武堂) and promoted Zhang Zuolin to deputy military chief of the Fengtian Citizen Security Association. He served as Viceroy of the Three Northeast Provinces until the Xinhai Revolution overthrew the Qing dynasty in early 1912.

=== Under the Republic ===
In March 1912, the Provisional Assembly of the Republic of China passed a bill appointing Zhao as the Viceroy of Fengtian Province, giving him control over Manchuria just like when he was Viceroy of the Three Northeast Provinces. However, Zhao resigned on 3 November and returned to Beijing. In 1914, Yuan Shikai appointed Zhao as the director of the Qing History Bureau (清史館) to create a Draft History of Qing (Qing Shi Gao).

In March 1925, when Duan Qirui convened the Shanhou Conference (善後會議), he nominated Zhao to lead the conference. In June, when the Provisional National Council (臨時參政院) was established, Zhao was nominated to lead the council.

Zhao died in Beijing in 1927. His tomb is located at the north of Shenshan Village (神山村), Huaibei Town (懷北鎮), Huairou District, Beijing.
