= Duanfang =

Chinese politician (1861–1911)

- 端方
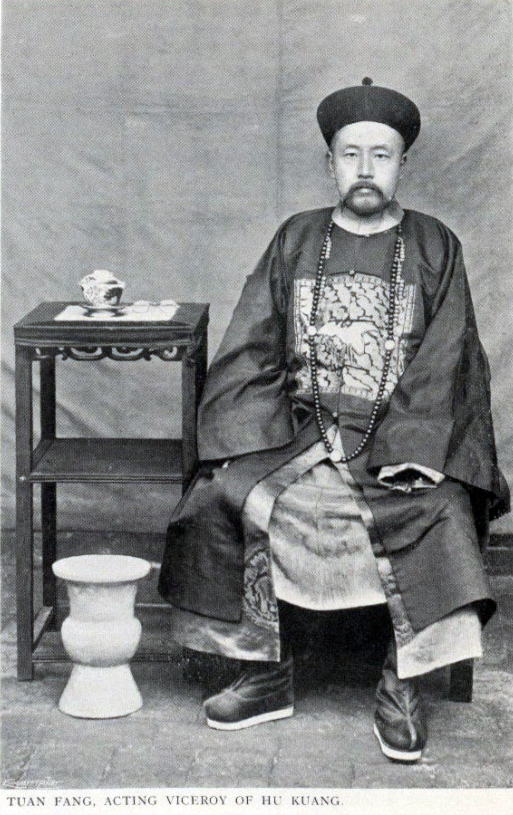
- Duanfang

Viceroy of Liangjiang
- In office 2 September 1906 – 28 June 1909
- Preceded by: Zhou Fu
- Succeeded by: Zhang Renjun

Viceroy of Huguang
- In office November 1902 – 1904
- Preceded by: Zhang Zhidong
- Succeeded by: Zhang Zhidong

Personal details
- Born: 20 April 1861
- Died: 27 November 1911 (aged 50) Zizhong County

Duanfang (Chinese: 端方; pinyin: Duānfāng; Wade–Giles: Tuan-fang; 20 April 1861 – 27 November 1911), courtesy name Wuqiao (simplified Chinese: 午桥; traditional Chinese: 午橋; pinyin: Wǔqiáo), was a Chinese politician, educator and collector. He was a member of the Tohoro surname (託濶羅 / 托活络)

== Life ==
Duanfang was allegedly Han Chinese even though he was under a Manchu banner. The Manchu White Banner were joined by some Zhejiang people with the family name Tao. Their last name was changed to the Manchu sounding "Tohoro". Duanfang was one of their descendants.

The Manchu bannermen typically used their first/personal name to address themselves and not their last name, while Han bannermen used their last name and first in normal Chinese custom. Duanfang followed the Manchu custom.

Duanfang passed the Imperial Examination in 1882 and then served as a yuanwailang (員外郎) before being promoted to langzhong (郎中). He supported the 1898 Hundred Days' Reform by Guangxu, but when it failed, he was protected by Ronglu and Li Lianying and was not implicated. The Qing government established the agriculture, commerce, and trade bureau in Beijing, and Duanfang was placed in charge of the bureau. Empress Dowager Cixi awarded Duanfang with an official cap of the third rank. Duanfang purchased a batch of animals from Germany for the Beijing Zoo.

Since then, Duanfang took the post of Ningpo city and Xi`an city provincial judge, administrative commissioner, and agent of the Shaanxi governor. In 1900, after Beijing was occupied by the forces of the Eight-Nation Alliance after the Battle of Beijing, Empress Dowager Cixi and the Guangxu Emperor fled to Shaanxi. Duanfang was transferred to a new post as Henan provincial administrative commissioner, and then to governor of Hubei. In 1902, Duanfang served as acting Viceroy of Liangjiang, Afterward, he was transferred to a new post as Governor of Hunan. In his successive posts, he encouraged students to study abroad, known as an enlightened person, "enthusiastic in experience in foreign and domestic affairs."

In 1905, Duanfang was recalled to Beijing, and was promoted to Viceroy of Min-Zhe, although when he took office, he was dispatched to do more important tasks. On September 24, because of the Constitutional Movement, the Qing government sent Duanfang along with Zaize, Dai Hongci, Xu Shichang, and Shao Ying to go one a diplomatic mission to the West to study constitutions in order to prepare the Qing constitution. When the five ministers embarked on that day, a revolutionary, Wu Yue, activated a suicide bomb at the Zhengyangmen train station in an assassination attempt, resulting in the postponement of the journey. Xu Shichang, Shaoying, and Li Shengduo were replaced by Shang Qiheng.

Duanfang wrote articles against footbinding in support of the Foot Emancipation Society.

On December 7, Duanfang and Dai Hongci departed in secrecy, with 33 official members on a warship from Qinhuangdao to Shanghai, and on December 19 in the afternoon transfer to an American cruise to Japan. They visited Japan, the United States, the United Kingdom, France, Germany, Denmark, Sweden, Norway, Austria, and Russia, returning in August the following year. After their return, Duanfang gave a summary of their inspection, advocating strongly that the main source of study should be on the Japanese Meiji Restoration, and as fast as possible formulate the Qing Empire's Constitution.

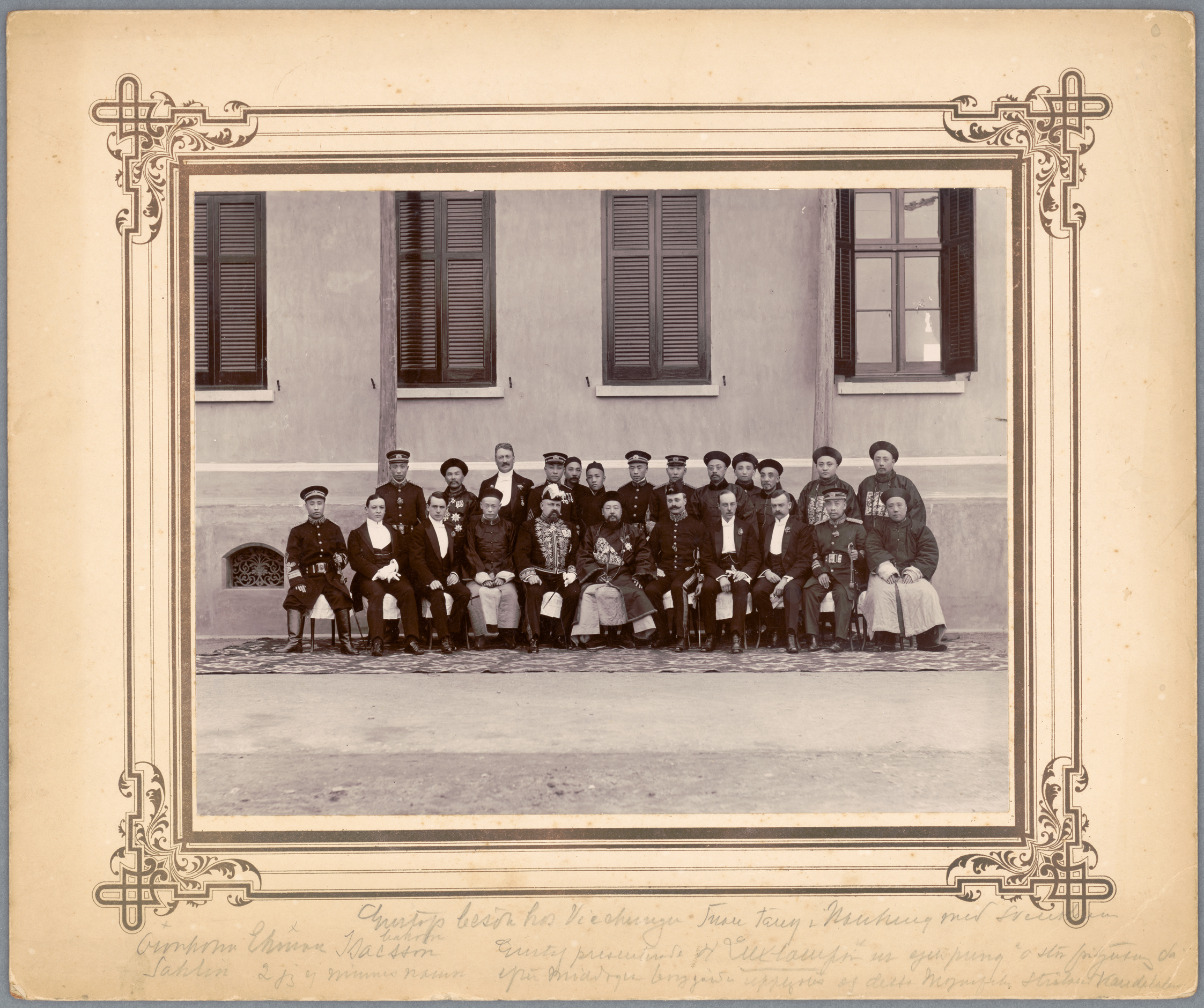
The Swedish envoy Gustaf Wallenberg visits the vice-king Tuan Fang in Nanking 1907

After returning to China, Duanfang served as Viceroy of Liangjiang. In 1909, he became Governor of Zhili. Due to photographs being taken at the funeral of Empress Dowager Cixi, Duanfang was dismissed from office.

The Nanyang industrial exposition took place while Duanfang was Nanyang chancellor (南洋大臣).

On May 18, 1911, Duanfang was appointed as the Chuanhan and Yuehan railroad's superintendent. The Railway Protection Movement erupted over the nationalization of local railroad construction and their transfer to foreign banks. Duanfang arrived in Hankou on July 14. On September 7, due to a murder in Chengdu, the situation of Sichuan spiraled out of control, eventually resulting in the Xinhai Revolution. On September 10, the Qing imperial court removed Zhao Erfeng as governor of Sichuan, and Duanfang became the acting governor, he led the Hubei New Army into Sichuan. The new army mutinied on November 27, and officer Liu Yifeng killed Duanfang, as part of a general wave of anti Manchu violence during the revolution.

== Educational achievements ==
Duanfang was one of the founders of China's modern education. While he was acting Viceroy of Liangjiang, he founded the Jinan Academy in Nanjing. As governor of Hubei and Hunan, he established the Teacher's College. While he was governor of Jiangsu, determined to get rid of bad habits, he ordered counties to refund red envelopes to send two local students to study abroad.

Duanfang was the founder of the first kindergarten in China and provincial libraries. He also sent more than 20 girls to Japan to study pedagogy. The Jiangnan Library was founded by Duanfang in Nanjing in 1907.

== Collection ==
Duanfang was a well-known collector of antiques, and maintained a good relationship with Paul Pelliot and others. During his inspection tours abroad, he also collected ancient Egyptian artifacts, becoming the first modern Chinese person to have a collection of foreign artifacts. After he died in Sichuan, his children lived in poverty, and in 1924 they sold his most famous collection, a set of Shang dynasty bronze artifacts, for about 20 million taels of silver to John Calvin Ferguson. The bronzes are now in the collection of the Metropolitan Museum of Art, New York City.
