= Zhang Renjun =

Chinese politician (1846–1927)

- 張人駿
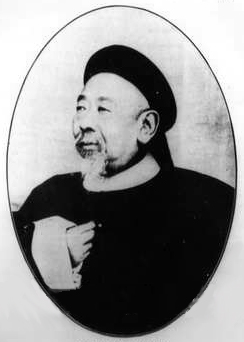

Viceroy of Liangjiang
- In office June 28, 1909 – January 23, 1912
- Preceded by: Fan Zengxiang
- Succeeded by: Zhang Xun

Viceroy of Liangguang
- In office August 12, 1907 – June 28, 1909
- Preceded by: Cen Chunxuan
- Succeeded by: Yuan Shuxun

Personal details
- Born: February 24, 1846
- Died: February 8, 1927 (aged 80)
- Education: Jinshi degree in the Imperial Examination (1868)
- Occupation: politician

Zhang Renjun (Chinese: 張人駿; February 24, 1846 – February 8, 1927) courtesy name Qianli (Chinese: 千里) was Viceroy of Liangguang from August 12, 1907, to June 28, 1909, and the last Viceroy of Liangjiang from June 28, 1909, until the overthrow of the Qing dynasty in the Xinhai Revolution and the establishment of the Republic of China on January 23, 1912.

Zhang is in-laws with Yuan Shikai. Eileen Chang, the novelist, is a cousin.

| Preceded by Cen Chunxuan | Viceroy of Liangguang; 1907–1909 | Succeeded by Yuan Shuxun |
