= 1996 in China =

- Decades: 1970s; 1980s; 1990s; 2000s; 2010s
- See also: Other events of 1996; History of China • Timeline • Years

The following lists events from 1996 in China.

== Incumbents ==
- Party General Secretary: Jiang Zemin
- President: Jiang Zemin
- Premier: Li Peng
- Vice President: Rong Yiren
- Vice Premier: Zhu Rongji

=== Governors ===
- Governor of Anhui Province – Hui Liangyu
- Governor of Fujian Province – Chen Mingyi then He Guoqiang
- Governor of Gansu Province – Zhang Wule then Sun Ying
- Governor of Guangdong Province – Zhu Senlin then Lu Ruihua
- Governor of Guizhou Province – Chen Shineng then Wu Yixia
- Governor of Hainan Province – Ruan Chongwu
- Governor of Hebei Province – Ye Liansong
- Governor of Heilongjiang Province – Tian Fengshan
- Governor of Henan Province – Ma Zhongchen
- Governor of Hubei Province – Jiang Zhuping
- Governor of Hunan Province – Yang Zhengwu
- Governor of Jiangsu Province – Zheng Silin
- Governor of Jiangxi Province – Shu Shengyou
- Governor of Jilin Province – Wang Yunkun
- Governor of Liaoning Province – Wen Shizhen
- Governor of Qinghai Province – Tian Chengping
- Governor of Shaanxi Province – Cheng Andong
- Governor of Shandong Province – Li Chunting
- Governor of Shanxi Province – Sun Wensheng
- Governor of Sichuan Province – Xiao Yang then Song Baorui
- Governor of Yunnan Province – Li Jiating
- Governor of Zhejiang Province – Wan Xueyuan

== Events ==
=== January ===
- January 27 – Miss Chinese International Pageant 1996 was held.

=== February ===
- February 14 –
  - Intelsat 708 was destroyed (day in China at the time).
  - Long March 3B launched its first flight.
- February 3 – 1996 Lijiang earthquake hit Lijiang City and left at least 322 killed, 3,925 serious injuries, and 13,000 injuries.

=== March ===
- March 23 –
  - The Republic of China presidential election took place. Lee Teng-hui was elected president and Lien Chan as vice president.
  - The Third Taiwan Strait Crisis ended.

=== April ===
- April 14 to October 27 – Chinese Jia-A League 1996 was held with Dalian Wanda winning the championship.

=== June ===
- June 24 – Hengda Enterprise Company founded by Xu Jiayi, as predecessor of conglomerate, mainly real estate business, Evergrande was founded in Shenzhen, Guangdong Province.

=== July ===
- July 19 to August 4 – China competed in the 1996 Summer Olympics with total of 294 athletes.

=== September ===
- September 27 to 29 – The first round of the 1996 FIVB World Grand Prix took place in Shanghai.

== Births ==
- January 2 — Xiaoyu Yu, figure skater
- January 3 — Liu Yao Yuan, actor
- January 7 — Fu Yuanhui, swimmer
- January 22 – Gao Shiyan, basketball player
- February 17 — Yan Xi, actor
- February 25 — Wang Ziqi, actor
- March 5 — Zhou Yan Chen, actor
- March 23 — Zhao Wenhao, actor
- March 31 — Chen Xingxu, actor
- May 4 – Richard Lin, actor
- June 10 - Jun (entertainer) (born Wen Junhui), singer, actor, member of Seventeen
- June 22 — Zhang Xiaoang, actor
- June 25 — Cai Yi Jia, actor
- July 8 — Zhang He Hao Zhen, actor
- July 24 — Zhang Mo Huai, actor
- August 27 — Wang Jian, long jumper
- September 20 — Leo Dong, actor
- October 4 — Lin Yiming, actor
- October 19 — Caesar Wu, actor
- October 29 — Chen Zheyuan, actor
- December 29 — Marcus Li, actor

== Deaths ==
- January 4 — Zhou Mingzhen, paleomammalogist and vertebrate paleontologist (b. 1918)
- January 17 — Zhu Xuefan, politician (b. 1905)
- January 20 — Lo Wei, Hong Kong film director and film actor (b. 1918)
- January 27 — Chen Chu, diplomat (b. 1917)
- February 2 — Li Peiyao, politician (b. 1933)
- February 8 — Li Guoping, mathematician (b. 1910)
- March 1 — Ng Wui, Hong Kong film director, writer and actor (b. 1913)
- March 14 — Wang Luobin, songwriter (b. 1913)
- March 19 — Chen Jingrun, mathematician (b. 1933)
- May 5 — Ai Qing, poet (b. 1910)
- May 9 — Lu Dingyi, politician (b. 1906)
- May 12 — Chiang Chao-shen, calligrapher, painter and seal engraver (b. 1925)
- June 24 — Zhao Lei, actor (b. 1928)
- June 28 — Kwan Tak-hing, Hong Kong martial artist and actor (b. 1905)
- August 25 — Dai Houying, novelist (b. 1938)
- September 13 — Wang Shoudao, politician (b. 1906)
- September 18 — Bai Yang, film and drama actress (b. 1920)
- September 26 — David Chan Yuk-cheung, prominent leader of the Baodiao movement in Hong Kong (b. 1950)
- September 27 — Lee Tit, director (b. 1913)
- September 29 — Li Qiang, revolutionary, military engineer, secret agent, radio scientist, diplomat and politician (b. 1905)
- October 1 — Deng Yuzhi, social activist (b. 1900)
- October 5 — Duanmu Hongliang, writer (b. 1912)
- October 21 — Wang Li, propagandist (b. 1922)
- November 2 — Yan Jici, physicist and politician (b. 1901)
- November 10 — Zhou Gucheng, politician (b. 1898)
- November 17 — Huo Shilian, politician (b. 1909)
- November 18 — Zhu Zuxiang, soil scientist and politician (b. 1916)
- December 13 — Cao Yu, playwright (b. 1910)
- December 17
  - Li Han-hsiang, film director (b. 1926)
  - Sun Yaoting, last imperial court eunuch of Chinese history (b. 1902)

== See also ==
- List of Chinese films of 1996
- List of Hong Kong films of 1996
- Category:1996 Establishments in China
- China at the 1996 Summer Olympics
- China at the 1996 Summer Paralympics
- China at the 1996 Asian Winter Games

== External sources ==
- China in 1996 :: The Economy -- Encyclopædia Britannica
