= 1994 in China =

- Decades: 1970s; 1980s; 1990s; 2000s; 2010s
- See also: Other events of 1994; History of China • Timeline • Years

The following lists events from 1994 in China.

== Incumbents ==
- General Secretary of the Communist Party: Jiang Zemin
- President: Jiang Zemin
- Premier: Li Peng
- Vice President: Rong Yiren
- Vice Premier: Zhu Rongji

=== Governors ===
- Governor of Anhui Province – Fu Xishou then Hui Liangyu
- Governor of Fujian Province – Jia Qinglin then Chen Mingyi
- Governor of Gansu Province – Zhang Wule then Sun Ying
- Governor of Guangdong Province – Zhu Senlin then Lu Ruihua
- Governor of Guizhou Province – Chen Shineng then Wu Yixia
- Governor of Hainan Province – Ruan Chongwu
- Governor of Hebei Province – Ye Liansong
- Governor of Heilongjiang Province – Shao Qihui then Tian Fengshan
- Governor of Henan Province – Ma Zhongchen
- Governor of Hubei Province – Jia Zhijie then Jiang Zhuping
- Governor of Hunan Province – Chen Bangzhu then Yang Zhengwu
- Governor of Jiangsu Province – Chen Huanyou then Zheng Silin
- Governor of Jiangxi Province – Wu Guanzheng
- Governor of Jilin Province – Gao Yan
- Governor of Liaoning Province – Yue Qifeng then Wen Shizhen
- Governor of Qinghai Province – Tian Chengping
- Governor of Shaanxi Province – Bai Qingcai (until December), Cheng Andong (starting December)
- Governor of Shandong Province – Zhao Zhihao
- Governor of Shanxi Province – Sun Wensheng
- Governor of Sichuan Province – Xiao Yang then Song Baorui
- Governor of Yunnan Province – Li Jiating
- Governor of Zhejiang Province – Wan Xueyuan

== Events ==
=== January ===
- January 23 — Miss Chinese International Pageant 1994 Finals took place.

=== April ===
- April 17 — Chinese Jia-A League 1994 was begun.

=== May ===
- May 3 — Some scientists at Anhui use the technology of Genetic engineering to successful improve Oryza sativa.

=== June ===
China Northwest Airlines Flight 2303 - crashed

=== July ===
- China Unicom, one of the world's leading mobile provider,

=== August ===
1994 Kenpeng mine disaster

=== September ===
- 1994 Hong Kong local elections took place on September 18. Martin Lee was elected Chairman of the Democratic Party.
- Tian Mingjian incident was a mass murder incident that took place on September 20, 1994, in Beijing.

=== November ===
- November 13 — Chinese Jia-A League 1994 was ended.
- November 27 – According to Chinese government and Liaoning province official confirmed report, a Fuxin Yiyuan Dance hall caught fire in Liaoning Province, 71 persons were safed, 233 persons were human fatalities.

=== December ===
- December 8 — The 1994 Karamay fire. It took 325 people dead and 130+ people injured. It took place in the town of Karamay.

=== Undated ===
- Sino-Pack, first packaging products exhibition is held.

== Births ==
- March 6 — Ayen Ho, singer, guitarist and songwriter
- April 2 — Yang Xuwen, actor
- April 11 — Zha Jie, actor and model
- May 18 — Wang Bowen, singer, actor and professional table tennis player
- June 16 — Liang Jie, actress
- June 19 — Xu Mengjie, singer and actress
- September 23 — Bai Lu, actress, model and Singer
- October 1 — Mao Buyi, singer and songwriter
- October 16 — Chen Ruoxuan, actor
- October 20
  - Xu Weizhou, actor, singer and songwriter
  - Wang Xiaoxue, professional association football player
- October 25 — Peng Yuchang, actor and singer
- October 31 — Chen Yao, actress
- December 28 — Xu Lu, actress and singer

== Deaths ==
- January 1 — Chi Jishang, geologist and petrologist (b. 1917)
- February 15 — Liu Ningyi, politician (b. 1907)
- February 28 — Pujie, Qing Dynasty imperial prince (b. 1907)
- March 2 — Yuan Hanqing, chemist (b. 1905)
- March 23 — Zhang Zhenhuan, general and political leader (b. 1915)
- March 24 — Jiang Yizhen, politician (b. 1915)
- March 29 — Jiang Zehan, mathematician and founder of China's topology (b. 1902)
- April 11 — Chu Tunan, politician (b. 1899)
- April 23 — Zhu Futang, pediatrician (b. 1899)
- June 1 — Huang Zuolin, film director (b. 1906)
- June 23 — Chang Shuhong, painter (b. 1904)
- June 29 — Liu Fangwu, nationalist general (b. 1898)
- July 19 — Han Xu, diplomat (b. 1924)
- August 7 — Liu Haisu, painter and noted art educator (b. 1896)
- October 18 — Li Qingwei, politician (b. 1920)
- October 25
  - Yang Dezhi, general and politician (b. 1911)
  - Hou Jingru, army officer and politician (b. 1902)
- December 11 — Yao Yilin, former Vice Premier of China (b. 1917)
- December 30 — Xu Yixin, associate of the 28 Bolsheviks (b. 1911)

== See also ==
- List of Chinese films of 1994
- List of Hong Kong films of 1994
- China at the 1994 Winter Olympics
- China at the 1994 Asian Games
- 1994 UFO sighting in China
