= 1998 in China =

- Decades: 1970s; 1980s; 1990s; 2000s; 2010s
- See also: Other events of 1998; History of China • Timeline • Years

The following lists events in the year 1998 in China.

== Incumbents ==
- Party General Secretary: Jiang Zemin
- President: Jiang Zemin
- Premier: Li Peng (until 17 March), Zhu Rongji (starting 17 March)
- Vice President: Rong Yiren (until March 12), Hu Jintao (starting March 15)
- Vice Premier: Zhu Rongji (until March 17) Li Lanqing (starting March 17)

=== Governors ===
- Governor of Anhui Province – Hui Liangyu then Wang Taihua
- Governor of Fujian Province – He Guoqiang
- Governor of Gansu Province – Sun Ying then Song Zhaosu
- Governor of Guangdong Province – Lu Ruihua
- Governor of Guizhou Province – Wu Yixia then Qian Yunlu
- Governor of Hainan Province – Ruan Chongwu then Wang Xiaofeng
- Governor of Hebei Province – Ye Liansong then Yue Qifeng
- Governor of Heilongjiang Province – Tian Fengshan
- Governor of Henan Province – Ma Zhongchen then Li Keqiang
- Governor of Hubei Province – Jiang Zhuping
- Governor of Hunan Province – Yang Zhengwu then Chu Bo
- Governor of Jiangsu Province – Zheng Silin then Ji Yunshi
- Governor of Jiangxi Province – Shu Shengyou
- Governor of Jilin Province – Wang Yunkun then Hong Hu
- Governor of Liaoning Province – Wen Shizhen (until January), Zhang Guoguang (starting January)
- Governor of Qinghai Province – Bai Enpei
- Governor of Shaanxi Province – Cheng Andong
- Governor of Shandong Province – Li Chunting
- Governor of Shanxi Province – Sun Wensheng
- Governor of Sichuan Province – Song Baorui
- Governor of Yunnan Province – Li Jiating
- Governor of Zhejiang Province – Chai Songyue

== Events ==
- 9th National People's Congress
- Launch of the Three Stresses campaign
- June–September — 1998 Yangtze River floods
- June 23 — Chenggu axe massacre
- November 11 — Tencent founded.
- November 19 — 1998 Ninglang earthquake
- In 1998, the Commission on Science, Technology, and Industry for National Defense (COSTIND) began the "national defence science and technology innovation project."

== Births ==
- January 10 — Xu Shilin, tennis player
- December 16 — Zhou Jieqiong, singer and actress, member of I.O.I and Pristin
- December 27 — He Jie, athlete

== Deaths ==
- January 10 — Deng Guangming, historian (b. 1907)
- January 28 — Lee Ya-Ching, film actress, pioneering aviator and philanthropist (b. 1912)
- February 22 — Han Youwen, Salar Muslim general and politician (b. 1912)
- March 13 — Ma Yueliang, Manchu teacher of Tai chi (b. 1901)
- April 9 — Lü Shuxiang, linguist, lexicographer and educator (b. 1904)
- April 12 — Xin Fengxia, pingju opera performer (b. 1927)
- May 3 — Xue Yue, Nationalist general (b. 1896)
- May 21 — Li Bo, phytoecologist (b. 1929)
- May 27 — Shu Tong, politician (b. 1905)
- May 28 — Chung-Yao Chao, theoretical physicist (b. 1902)
- June 27 — Tso-hsin Cheng, ornithologist (b. 1906)
- August 6 — Deng Zhaoxiang, naval officer (b. 1903)
- August 17 — Shi Zhe, military officer, diplomat, translator and interpreter (b. 1905)
- August 28 — Lu Dadong, communist revolutionary and politician (b. 1915)
- September 14
  - Yang Shangkun, 4th President of China (b. 1907)
  - Zhang Zongxun, general (b. 1908)
- October 7 — Ru Zhijuan, writer (b. 1925)
- October 8 — Zhang Chongren, sculptor (b. 1907)
- October 9 — Xiao Yang, politician (b. 1929)
- November 26 — M. T. Cheng, mathematician (b. 1917)
- December 5 — Cheung Tze-keung, notorious Hong Kong gangster (b. 1955)
- December 10 — Wang Ganchang, nuclear physicist (b. 1907)
- December 11 — Chen Puru, politician (b. 1918)
- December 13 — Liang Xiang, politician (b. 1919)
- December 19 — Qian Zhongshu, literary scholar and writer (b. 1910)
- December 28 — Wang Dezhao, physicist (b. 1905)

== Culture ==
- List of Chinese films of 1998

== Sport ==
- January 18–24 – 1998 Four Nations Tournament (women's football), in Guangzhou
- March 15–21 – 1998 IIHF Asian Oceanic Junior U18 Championship, in Harbin
- Chinese Jia-A League season: Chinese Jia-A League 1998
- China at the 1998 Asian Games
- China at the 1998 Winter Olympics won a total of 8 medals
