= 1999 in China =

- Decades: 1970s; 1980s; 1990s; 2000s; 2010s
- See also: Other events of 1999; History of China • Timeline • Years

Events in the year 1999 in China.

== Incumbents ==
- Party General Secretary – Jiang Zemin
- President – Jiang Zemin
- Premier – Zhu Rongji
- Vice President – Hu Jintao
- Vice Premier – Li Lanqing
- Congress Chairman – Li Peng
- Conference Chairman – Li Ruihuan

=== Governors ===
- Governor of Anhui Province – Wang Taihua
- Governor of Fujian Province – He Guoqiang then Xi Jinping
- Governor of Gansu Province – Song Zhaosu
- Governor of Guangdong Province – Lu Ruihua
- Governor of Guizhou Province – Qian Yunlu
- Governor of Hainan Province – Wang Xiaofeng
- Governor of Hebei Province – Yue Qifeng
- Governor of Heilongjiang Province – Tian Fengshan
- Governor of Henan Province – Li Keqiang
- Governor of Hubei Province – Jiang Zhuping
- Governor of Hunan Province – Chu Bo
- Governor of Jiangsu Province – Ji Yunshi
- Governor of Jiangxi Province – Shu Shengyou
- Governor of Jilin Province – Hong Hu
- Governor of Liaoning Province – Zhang Guoguang
- Governor of Qinghai Province – Bai Enpei then Zhao Leji
- Governor of Shaanxi Province – Cheng Andong
- Governor of Shandong Province – Li Chunting
- Governor of Shanxi Province – Sun Wensheng then Liu Zhenhua
- Governor of Sichuan Province – Song Baorui then Zhang Zhongwei
- Governor of Yunnan Province – Li Jiating
- Governor of Zhejiang Province – Chai Songyue

== Events ==
=== January ===
- January 4 – A pedestrian bridge in Qijiang, Chongqing collapsed and caused 40 people to die and 14 to be injured.

=== February ===
- February 24 – China Southwest Airlines Flight 4509 crashed on approach to Wenzhou Airport, killing 61 people.

=== April ===
- April 4 – Alibaba Group founded in Hangzhou
  - Key people: Jack Ma, Joseph Tsai
- April 15 – Korean Air Cargo Flight 6316 crashed in Xinzhuang, Shanghai after takeoff from Hongqiao Airport due to pilot's confusion between two units of measurement (feet and metres).

=== May ===
- May 8 – U.S. bombing of the Chinese embassy in Belgrade led to a series of anti-American protests in China.
  - Hu Jintao delivered a national televised speech

=== July ===
- July 22 – The Ministry of Civil Affairs declared Falun Gong as an illegal organization.

=== October ===
- October 1 – 50th anniversary of the founding of the People's Republic Parade and Speech by paramount leader Jiang Zemin.

=== November ===
- November 19 – Shenzhou 1 spacecraft launched.

=== December ===
- December 5 – Shenyang Haishi won Chongqing Longxin by 2-1 in the Chinese Jia-A League, which later led to a match-fixing controversy.
- December 19 and 20 – China assumed formal sovereignty over Macau from Portugal.

=== Full date unknown ===
- GRG Banking is founded in Guangzhou.

== Births ==
- February 10 – Tiffany Espensen, actress
- June 2 – Wei Yi, chess prodigy
- September 9 – Uudam, singer
- September 29 – Gu Haiyan, wheelchair fencer

== Deaths ==
- January 18 — Yuyan, calligrapher (b. 1918)
- February 3 — Yu Qiuli, army officer and politician (b. 1914)
- February 11 — Xiao Qian, essayist, editor, journalist and translator (b. 1910)
- February 28 — Bing Xin, writer (b. 1900)
- March 2 — Wang Heshou, Second Secretary of the Central Commission for Discipline Inspection (b. 1909)
- March 3 — Ling Zifeng, film director (b. 1917)
- March 21 — Willy Kan, Hong Kong apprentice jockey (b. 1978)
- April 15 — Roy Chiao, Hong Kong actor (b. 1927)
- April 18 — Ye Fei, Philippine-born Chinese military general and politician (b. 1914)
- April 21 — Su Xuelin, writer and scholar (b. 1897)
- April 27 — He Luting, composer (b. 1903)
- April 29 — Yao Xueyin, novelist (b. 1910)
- May 7 — Chen Yanyan, actress and film producer (b. 1916)
- May 8
  - The three reporters who died during the United States bombing of the Chinese embassy in Belgrade
  - Zhu Ying (b. 1971)
- June 10 — Chen Xilian, military officer and politician (b. 1915)
- August 15 — Liu Liankun, major general (b. 1933)
- August 16 — Regina Kent, Hong Kong actress (b. 1967)
- August 27 — Bai Guang, actress and singer (b. 1921)
- September 25 — Ding Sheng, general and politician (b. 1913)
- October 1 — Kuei Chih-Hung, filmmaker (b. 1937)
- October 19 — Zeng Liansong, designer of the national flag of the People's Republic of China (b. 1917)
- October 27 — Xie Fei, 12th Secretary of the Guangdong Provincial Committee of the Chinese Communist Party (b. 1932)
- November 9 — Huang Huoqing, politician (b. 1901)
- December 24 — Jiang Hua, 5th President of the Supreme People's Court of China (b. 1907)

== See also ==
- List of Chinese films of 1999
