= 1997 in China =

- Decades: 1970s; 1980s; 1990s; 2000s; 2010s
- See also: Other events of 1997; History of China • Timeline • Years

The following lists events in the year 1997 in China.

== Incumbents ==
- General Secretary of the Chinese Communist Party: Jiang Zemin
- President: Jiang Zemin
- Premier: Li Peng
- Vice President: Rong Yiren
- Vice Premier: Zhu Rongji

=== Governors ===
- Governor of Anhui Province – Hui Liangyu
- Governor of Fujian Province – He Guoqiang
- Governor of Gansu Province – Sun Ying then Song Zhaosu
- Governor of Guangdong Province – Lu Ruihua
- Governor of Guizhou Province – Wu Yixia
- Governor of Hainan Province – Ruan Chongwu then Wang Xiaofeng
- Governor of Hebei Province – Ye Liansong then Yue Qifeng
- Governor of Heilongjiang Province – Tian Fengshan
- Governor of Henan Province – Ma Zhongchen then Li Keqiang
- Governor of Hubei Province – Jiang Zhuping
- Governor of Hunan Province – Yang Zhengwu then Chu Bo
- Governor of Jiangsu Province – Zheng Silin then Ji Yunshi
- Governor of Jiangxi Province – Shu Shengyou
- Governor of Jilin Province – Wang Yunkun then Hong Hu
- Governor of Liaoning Province – Wen Shizhen
- Governor of Qinghai Province – Tian Chengping then Bai Enpei
- Governor of Shaanxi Province – Cheng Andong
- Governor of Shandong Province – Li Chunting
- Governor of Shanxi Province – Sun Wensheng
- Governor of Sichuan Province – Song Baorui
- Governor of Yunnan Province – Li Jiating
- Governor of Zhejiang Province – Wan Xueyuan (until April), Chai Songyue (starting April)

== Events ==
- January 21 – 1997 Jiashi earthquakes
- February 3 to 5 – Ghulja Incident
- February 25 – 1997 Ürümqi bus bombings
- April 29 – According to Chinese government official confirmed report, two passenger train collision on Rongjiawan Station, Hunan Province, 120 persons were fatalities with 230 persons were hurt.
- May 8 – China Southern Airlines Flight 3456
- July 1 – Transfer of sovereignty over Hong Kong
- August – Typhoon Winnie (1997)
- September 19 – Election of the 15th Politburo of the Chinese Communist Party
- November 8 – 1997 Manyi earthquake

== Culture ==
- 1997 Shanghai International Film Festival: The Woodlanders won the award for Best Feature Film
- List of Chinese films of 1997

== Sport ==
- December 5–14 – 1997 AFC Women's Championship, in Guangdong
- Chinese Jia-A League 1997
- China at the 1997 East Asian Games

== Births ==
- January - Fan Zhendong, Chinese professional table tennis player.
- April 3 - Zhao Xintong, Chinese professional snooker player.
- July 7 - Liu Yan (golfer)
- November - Xu Minghao, singer, member of Seventeen.

== Deaths ==
- January 14 — King Hu, film director based in Hong Kong and Taiwan (b. 1932)
- January 28 — Wong Shun-leung, Hong Kong martial artist (b. 1935)
- February 2 — Qin Jiwei, general (b. 1914)
- February 17 — Leonard Ho, Hong Kong film producer (b. 1925)
- February 19 — Deng Xiaoping, 3rd Paramount Leader of China (b. 1904)
- March 31 — Dorothy Liu, Hong Kong pro-Beijing politician (b. 1934)
- April 9 — Wu Zuoren, painter (b. 1908)
- April 11 — Wang Xiaobo, novelist and essayist (b. 1952)
- April 26 — Peng Zhen, 4th Chairman of the Standing Committee of the National People's Congress (b. 1902)
- May 6 — Wang You, biochemist (b. 1910)
- May 7 — Yip Hon, gambling tycoon (b. 1904)
- May 16 — Wang Zengqi, writer (b. 1920)
- May 25 — Luo Ergang, historian (b. 1901)
- June 6 — Liao Shantao, mathematician (b. 1920)
- June 10 — Zhou Lin, politician (b. 1912)
- June 27 — Joseph Zong Huaide, Roman Catholic Bishop of Roman Catholic Diocese of Shandong (b. 1917)
- June 28 — Yang Yichen, politician (b. 1914)
- June 30 — Su Bingqi, archaeologist and co-founder of Peking University's archaeology program (b. 1909)
- September 8 — Yu Jim-yuen, martial artist, actor, teacher and the master of China Drama Academy (b. 1905)
- September 22 — Chiang Wei-kuo, Nationalist general and adopted son of Chiang Kai-shek (b. 1916)
- September 23 — Lu Sheng, lieutenant general (b. 1911)
- October 7 — Wan Laiming, animator (b. 1900)
- October 17 – Fang Yi, former Vice Premier of China (b. 1916)
- October 20 — Li Ruishan, politician (b. 1920)
- October 26 — Teng Haiqing, military officer and politician (b. 1909)
- November 8 — Lam Ching-ying, Hong Kong stuntman, actor, martial artist and action director (b. 1952)
- November 9 — Wu Xiuquan, military officer and diplomat (b. 1908)
- December 4 — Ho Sin Hang, Hong Kong entrepreneur, philanthropist and financier (b. 1900)
- December 16 — Hu Ning, physicist and writer (b. 1916)
