= 2000 in China =

- Decades: 1980s; 1990s; 2000s; 2010s; 2020s
- See also: Other events of 2000; History of China • Timeline • Years

The following lists events that happened during 2000 in China.

== Incumbents ==
- Party General Secretary — Jiang Zemin
- President — Jiang Zemin
- Premier — Zhu Rongji
- Vice President — Hu Jintao
- Vice Premier — Li Lanqing
- Congress Chairman — Li Peng
- Conference Chairman — Li Ruihuan

=== Governors ===
- Governor of Anhui Province — Wang Taihua then Xu Zhonglin
- Governor of Fujian Province — Xi Jinping
- Governor of Gansu Province — Song Zhaosu
- Governor of Guangdong Province — Lu Ruihua
- Governor of Guizhou Province — Qian Yunlu
- Governor of Hainan Province — Wang Xiaofeng
- Governor of Hebei Province — Yue Qifeng
- Governor of Heilongjiang Province — Tian Fengshan then Song Fatang
- Governor of Henan Province — Li Keqiang
- Governor of Hubei Province — Jiang Zhuping
- Governor of Hunan Province — Chu Bo
- Governor of Jiangsu Province — Ji Yunshi
- Governor of Jiangxi Province — Shu Shengyou
- Governor of Jilin Province — Hong Hu
- Governor of Liaoning Province — Zhang Guoguang
- Governor of Qinghai Province — Zhao Leji
- Governor of Shaanxi Province — Cheng Andong
- Governor of Shandong Province — Li Chunting
- Governor of Shanxi Province — Liu Zhenhua
- Governor of Sichuan Province — Zhang Zhongwei
- Governor of Yunnan Province — Li Jiating (until June), Xu Rongkai (starting June)
- Governor of Zhejiang Province — Chai Songyue

== Events ==
=== January ===
- January 14 — 2000 Yunnan earthquake: An earthquake measuring 5.9 in magnitude occurred in the Yunnan province in southwest China, killing 7 people and injuring at least 2,528 more. Almost 41,000 homes were levelled by the earthquake.
- January — Baidu, an internet search engine, was founded.

=== October ===
- October 28 — Jiang Zemin berated Hong Kong journalist Sharon Cheung.

=== December ===
- December 25 — 2000 Luoyang Christmas fire: A shopping center fire at Luoyang, Henan, China kills 309.

== Births ==
- March 12 — Sabrina Man, Chinese-Filipina-Canadian actress, television host and commercial model.
- June 16 — Yifei Ye, racing driver
- July 25 — Zhang Hao, singer.
- November 4 - Sun Yingsha, table tennis player.

== Deaths ==
- January 5 — Xie Bingying, soldier and writer (b. 1906)
- January 8 — Ray Huang, historian and philosopher (b. 1918)
- January 21 — Ho Ying-chie, Hong Kong businessman and philanthropist (b. 1911)
- January 22 — Dai Suli, politician (b. 1919)
- February 2 — Li Zhun, novelist (b. 1928)
- February 10 — Ji Pengfei, 3rd Minister of Foreign Affairs of China (b. 1910)
- February 16
  - Wang Zigan, Shanghai-style paper-cutter (b. 1920)
  - Fung Fung, Hong Kong actor (b. 1916)
- March 4
  - Wu Ta-You, physicist (b. 1907)
  - Xie Xide, physicist (b. 1921)
- March 18 — Pei Lisheng, 2nd and 4th Governor of Shanxi (b. 1906)
- March 19 — Li Huanzhi, classical composer (b. 1919)
- March 21 — Bai Shouyi, ethnologist, historian, social activist and writer (b. 1909)
- April 10 — Angela Yu Chien, Hong Kong actress (b. 1942)
- April 16 — Ann Mui, Hong Kong singer and actress (b. 1959)
- April 29 — Chen Fangyun, electrical engineer (b. 1916)
- May 9 — Zheng Weishan, lieutenant general and politician (b. 1915)
- May 21 — Zhao Puchu, religious and public leader (b. 1907)
- June 3 — Ann Tse-kai, Hong Kong industrialist, legislator and sinologist (b. 1912)
- June 12 — Yun Bulong, 7th Chairman of the Government of Inner Mongolia Autonomous Region (b. 1937)
- June 16 — Jiang Weiqing, 4th Secretary of the Jiangxi Provincial Committee of the Chinese Communist Party (b. 1910)
- June 23 — Geng Biao, 5th Minister of National Defense of China (b. 1909)
- July 17 — Zhao Lirong, singer and film actress (b. 1928)
- July 23 — Kao Pao-shu, actress, producer, writer and film director (b. 1932)
- August 28 — Liao Zhigao, politician (b. 1913)
- September 14 — Cheng Kejie, 8th Chairman of the Government of Guangxi Zhuang Autonomous Region (b. 1933)
- September 18 — Chen Yuefang, basketball player (b. 1963)
- October 16 — Lu Xiaopeng, aircraft designer (b. 1920)
- November 4 — Pok Shau-fu, journalist and politician (b. 1909)
- November 5 — Hu Sheng, Marxist theorist and historian (b. 1918)
- November 11 — Wei Qiming, actor (b. 1926)
- November 27 — Lin Yaohua, sociologist and anthropologist (b. 1910)

== See also ==
- 2000 in Chinese film
- Hong Kong League Cup 2000–01
