= 1992 in China =

- Decades: 1970s; 1980s; 1990s; 2000s; 2010s
- See also: Other events of 1992; History of China • Timeline • Years

The following lists events from 1992 in China.

== Incumbents ==
- General Secretary of the Chinese Communist Party: Jiang Zemin
- President: Yang Shangkun
- Premier: Li Peng
- Vice President: Wang Zhen
- Vice Premier: Yao Yilin

=== Governors ===
- Governor of Anhui Province – Fu Xishou
- Governor of Fujian Province – Jia Qinglin
- Governor of Gansu Province – Jia Zhijie
- Governor of Guangdong Province – Zhu Senlin
- Governor of Guizhou Province – Wang Zhaowen
- Governor of Hainan Province – Liu Jianfeng
- Governor of Hebei Province – Cheng Weigao
- Governor of Heilongjiang Province – Shao Qihui
- Governor of Henan Province – Li Changchun
- Governor of Hubei Province – Guo Shuyan
- Governor of Hunan Province – Chen Bangzhu
- Governor of Jiangsu Province – Chen Huanyou
- Governor of Jiangxi Province – Wu Guanzheng
- Governor of Jilin Province – Wang Zhongyu then Gao Yan
- Governor of Liaoning Province – Yue Qifeng
- Governor of Qinghai Province – Jin Jipeng then Tian Chengping
- Governor of Shaanxi Province – Bai Qingcai
- Governor of Shandong Province – Zhao Zhihao
- Governor of Shanxi Province – Wang Senhao then Hu Fuguo
- Governor of Sichuan Province – Zhang Haoruo
- Governor of Yunnan Province – Li Jiating
- Governor of Zhejiang Province – Wan Xueyuan

== Events ==
=== January ===
- The Miss Chinese International Pageant 1992 was held on January 26 in Hong Kong.
- Deng Xiaoping's southern tour

=== February ===
- The Ürümqi bombings took place on February 5.
- China participated in the 1992 Winter Olympics. China had three teams win Olympics medals, all of them silver, in various speed skating events.

=== March ===
- March 9 – The People's Republic of China ratifies the Treaty on the Non-Proliferation of Nuclear Weapons.

=== July ===
- A major plane crash took place in China.

=== August ===
- At the 1992 Summer Olympics, China won 54 Olympic medals (16 Gold, 22 Silver, and 16 Bronze).
- see also:China at the 1992 Summer Olympics
- Typhoon Omar begins

=== September ===
- China competed at the 1992 Summer Paralympics.

=== October ===
- Chinese Student Protection Act of 1992 was in effect starting October 9. This strengthened the role of Executive Order 12711, which was signed by George H. W. Bush in 1990.

=== November ===
- China Southern Airlines Flight 3943 crash

== Births ==
- June 3 – Dilraba Dilmurat, actress, singer and model
- June 17 – Sun Yiwen, fencer
- June 25 —- Chu Chen

== Deaths ==
- January 15 — Zhang Dazhi, military officer and politician (b. 1911)
- February 18 — Wang Huayun, politician (b. 1908)
- March 11 — Liu Geping, Hui politician and communist revolutionary (b. 1904)
- March 16 — Wang Renzhong, politician (b. 1917)
- April 3 — Nie Fengzhi, general (b. 1913)
- April 16 — Gao Bo, actor (b. 1918)
- April 22 — Kang Keqing, politician and 4th wife of Zhu De (b. 1911)
- May 14 — Nie Rongzhen, military leader (b. 1899)
- May 28 — Bai Hong, actress and singer (b. 1920)
- June 13 — Qu Wu, military officer and politician (b. 1898)
- June 21 — Li Xiannian, 3rd President of China (b. 1909)
- June 28 — Qian Sanqiang, nuclear physicist (b. 1913)
- July 11 — Deng Yingchao, 4th Chairman of the Chinese People's Political Consultative Conference and wife of Zhou En Lai (b. 1904)
- August 3 — Wang Hongwen, Vice Chairman of the Chinese Communist Party (b. 1935)
- August 20 — Liu Zhen, general (b. 1915)
- August 28 — Tan Qixiang, geographer and historian (b. 1911)
- September 5 — Zhou Wennan, communist revolutionary and judge (b. 1910)
- September 27 — Zhang Leping, comic artist (b. 1910)
- September 28 — Hu Qiaomu, sociologist, marxist philosopher and politician (b. 1912)
- October 10 — Sha Menghai, great master of calligraphy (b. 1900)
- October 14 — Qin Mu, educator and writer (b. 1919)
- November 8 — He Cheng, lieutenant general (b. 1901)
- November 17 — Lu Yao, novelist (b. 1949)
- Dates unknown
  - Zhao Xiu, politician (b. 1921)

== See also ==
- List of Chinese films of 1992
- China at the 1992 Winter Olympics
- Chinese Taipei at the 1992 Summer Olympics
