= 2015 in China =

- Decades: 1990s; 2000s; 2010s; 2020s
- See also: Other events of 2015; History of China • Timeline • Years

The following lists events that happened during 2015 in China.

== Incumbents ==
- General Secretary of the Chinese Communist Party – Xi Jinping
- President – Xi Jinping
- Vice President – Li Yuanchao
- Premier – Li Keqiang
- Congress chairman – Zhang Dejiang
- Consultative Conference chairman – Yu Zhengsheng

=== Governors ===
- Governor of Anhui Province – Wang Xuejun (until June), Li Jinbin (starting June)
- Governor of Fujian Province – Su Shulin (until November), Yu Weiguo (starting November)
- Governor of Gansu Province – Liu Weiping
- Governor of Guangdong Province – Zhu Xiaodan
- Governor of Guizhou Province – Chen Min'er (until October), Sun Zhigang (starting October)
- Governor of Hainan Province – Jiang Dingzhi (until January), Liu Cigui (starting January)
- Governor of Hebei Province – Zhang Qingwei
- Governor of Heilongjiang Province – Lu Hao
- Governor of Henan Province – Xie Fuzhan
- Governor of Hubei Province – Wang Guosheng
- Governor of Hunan Province – Du Jiahao
- Governor of Jiangsu Province – Li Xueyong (until November), Shi Taifeng (starting November)
- Governor of Jiangxi Province – Lu Xinshe
- Governor of Jilin Province – Jiang Chaoliang
- Governor of Liaoning Province – Li Xi (until May), Chen Qiufa (until May)
- Governor of Qinghai Province – Hao Peng
- Governor of Shaanxi Province – Lou Qinjian
- Governor of Shandong Province – Guo Shuqing
- Governor of Shanxi Province – Li Xiaopeng
- Governor of Sichuan Province – Wei Hong
- Governor of Yunnan Province – Chen Hao
- Governor of Zhejiang Province – Li Qiang

== Events ==
- Expected launch of Chang'e 4
- Earliest date for the first flight of Long March 5

=== January ===
- January 3 – The six-century-old Gongchen Tower in Weishan, Yunnan is destroyed by a fire.
- January 12 – In Xinjiang, Chinese police kill six militants.

=== February ===
- February 17
  - Chinese prosecutors say that former top Chinese Communist Party official Su Rong is under investigation for alleged corruption.
  - Chinese authorities also announce the indictment of former Guangdong official Zhu Mingguo, former Jinan CPC party chief Wang Min, and former Taiyuan party chief Chen Chuanping, all on charges of corruption.
- February 28
  - The municipal intermediate people's court for the eastern city of Dongying convicts Ni Fake, former Vice-Governor of Anhui in China, on charges of bribery and "amassing wealth of unclear origin", and sentences him to seventeen years in prison.
  - The Chinese People's Political Consultative Conference removes disgraced senior official Ling Jihua from the office of vice-chairman and also strips him of his ordinary delegate status.

=== March ===
- March 6 – At least two knife-wielding attackers injure nine people at a train station in Guangzhou. The police fatally shoot one of the suspects.

=== May ===
- May 4 – Meeting between General Secretary of the Chinese Communist Party Xi Jinping and Kuomintang Chairman Eric Chu in Beijing.
- May 19 – Chinese Wikipedia is blocked in China.

=== June ===
- June 1 – The Dong Fang Zhi Xing capsizes on the Yangtze River in Jianli County, Hubei during severe weather.

=== July ===
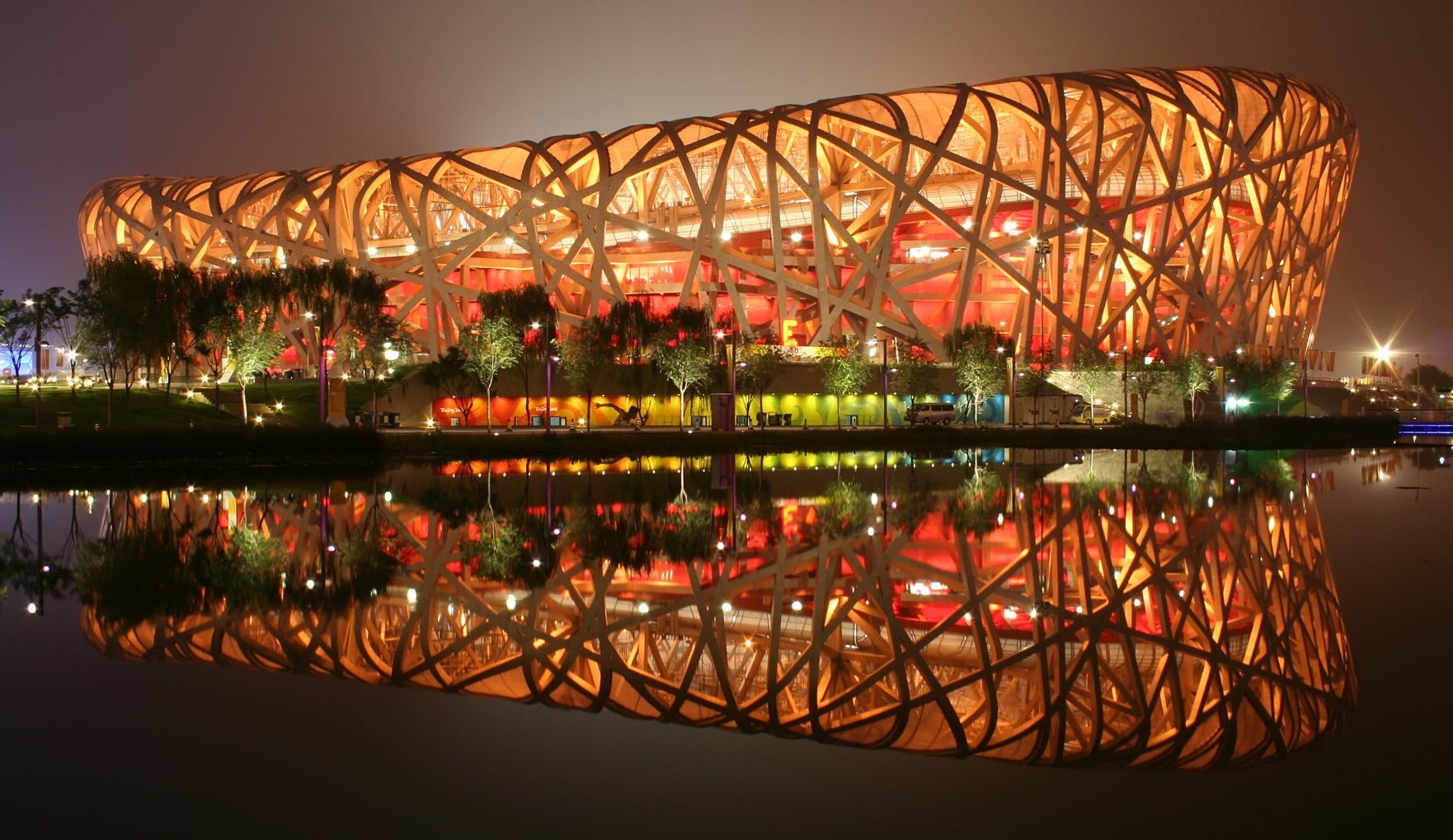
The Beijing National Stadium at night

- July 10 – Wu Xieyu murders his mother Xie Tianqin in Fuzhou, Fujian. Wu Xieyu would go on to defraud relatives and friends of 1.44 million yuan under false pretenses surrounding his mother.
- July 31 – International Olympic Committee selects Beijing as the host city of the 2022 Winter Olympics beating Almaty.

=== August ===
- August 12 – More than two explosions occurred within 30 seconds of each other at a container storage station at the Port of Tianjin in the Binhai New Area of Tianjin. Over 100 were killed and hundreds are injured. There were at least 700 tonnes of highly toxic sodium cyanide stored at the site. By August 15, local authorities ordered an evacuation.
- August 31 – A chemical explosion occurred in Dongying, Shandong, killing 5 people.

=== September ===
- September 3 – China's Victory over Japan Day 70th Anniversary Parade held in Beijing, the first military parade to commemorate Victory over Japan Day in the history of the People's Republic of China. Around 12,000 troops from the People's Liberation Army and more than 1,000 troops from 17 nations participated in the parade.
- September 7 – Explosion at Nanming Chemical Co Ltd's plant in Lishui, Zhejiang – the fourth since Tianjin, this time caused by ignited methanol. No reported casualties.
- September 30 – 17 Explosions at Liucheng County, Guangxi. Police reported 7 deaths, 51 injuries and 2 missing. Terrorism was ruled out, while speculation centered on fast delivery packages. One suspect was detained.

=== October ===
- October 26 to 29 – The Fifth Plenum of the 18th CPC National Congress held in Beijing. The plenum discusses about the thirteenth Five-year plans of China.

=== November ===
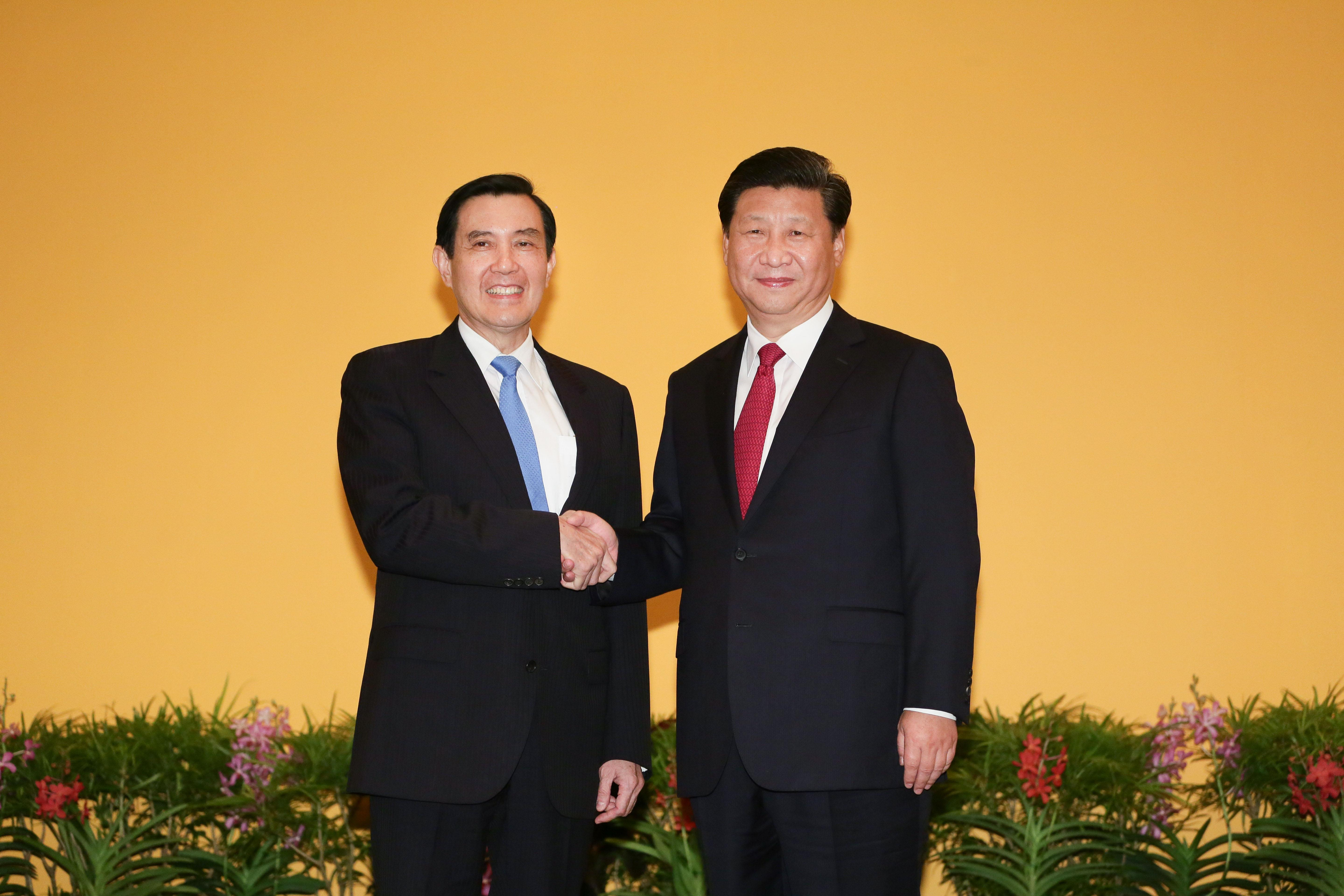
Ma Ying-jeou and Xi Jinping shaking hands at the First Ma–Xi meeting

- November 7 – Ma Ying-jeou and Xi Jinping met in Singapore, the first such meeting between the leaders of the two sides of the Taiwan Strait since the end of the Chinese Civil War.

=== December ===
- December 13 – National Memorial Day commemorating the 78th anniversary of the Nanking Massacre
- December 20 – a landslide happened in Guangming New Industrial Zone, Shenzhen, Guangdong. It has caused 7 deaths and about 75 to be missing, 16 are hospitalized. It is reported as man-made accident.
- December 28 – China approves an anti-terrorism law. US Government criticizes that China would use it as an excuse to corrupt its religious, company, speech and various freedom.
- December 31 – The PLA's Leader Department of Land Army, Rocket Army and Strategic Supportive Force established. Central Military Commission Chairman Xi Jinping masters the establishment ceremony.

== Culture ==
- List of Chinese films of 2015

== Sport ==
=== Association football ===
- Chinese Super League season: 2015 Chinese Super League
- China League One season: 2015 China League One
- China League Two season: 2015 China League Two
- Chinese FA Cup season: 2015 Chinese FA Cup

== Deaths ==
- January 14 – Zhang Wannian, general (b. 1928)
- February 10 – Deng Liqun, politician (b. 1915)
- March 15 – Xu Caihou, Former Vice Chairman of the Central Military Commission of the Chinese Communist Party (b. 1943)
- April 8 – Rayson Huang, Chinese chemist, vice-chancellor of the University of Hong Kong (1972–1986) (b. 1920)
- April 9 – Tsien Tsuen-hsuin, Chinese-born American sinologist, professor, and librarian (b. 1910)
- April 10 – Jin Youzhi, last surviving sibling of Puyi, the final ruler of the Qing Dynasty and last Emperor of China (b. 1918)
- May 27 – Zhang Jieqing, politician and writer (b. 1912)
- June 14 – Qiao Shi, 6th Chairman of the Standing Committee of the National People's Congress (b. 1924)
- July 15 – Wan Li, 5th Chairman of the Standing Committee of the National People's Congress (b. 1916)
- August 21 – Wang Dongxing, military commander and politician (b. 1916)
- September 3 – Zhang Zhen, general (b. 1914)
- September 6 – Gao Zheng, actor (b. 1922)
- October 9 – Du Runsheng, Chinese reformer and economist (b. 1913)
- December 4 – Xu Ming, Chinese entrepreneur and billionaire (b. 1971)
- December 6 – Liu Juying, Chinese politician and army general (b. 1917)

== Other ==
- September 25, 2014 – March 22, 2015 – 2014–2015 Chinese Short Track Speed Skating League
- January 4–10 – 2015 Shenzhen Open
- March 23–29 – 2015 World Figure Skating Championships, in Shanghai
- April 6–12 – 2015 IIHF Women's World Championship Division I Group B
- April 24 – November 1 – 2015 China F4 Championship season
- April 26–3 May – 2015 World Table Tennis Championships, in Suzhou
- 5–10 May – 2015 Archery World Cup first leg, in Shanghai
- August 22–30 – 2015 World Championships in Athletics, in Beijing
- 2015 Archery World Cup
- 2015 EAFF East Asian Cup
- 2015 FIBA Asia Championship for Women
- 2015 IAAF World Cross Country Championships, in Guiyang
- 2015 Sudirman Cup, in Dongguan

== See also ==
- List of Chinese films of 2015
