= 2005 in China =

- Decades: 1980s; 1990s; 2000s; 2010s; 2020s
- See also: Other events of 2005; History of China • Timeline • Years

Events in the year 2005 in China.

== Incumbents ==
- Party General Secretary – Hu Jintao
- President – Hu Jintao
- Premier – Wen Jiabao
- Vice President – Zeng Qinghong
- Vice Premier – Huang Ju
- Congress Chairman – Wu Bangguo
- Conference Chairman – Jia Qinglin

=== Governors ===
- Governor of Anhui Province – Wang Jinshan
- Governor of Fujian Province – Huang Xiaojing
- Governor of Guangdong Province – Lu Hao
- Governor of Guizhou Province – Huang Huahua
- Governor of Hainan Province – Shi Xiushi
- Governor of Hebei Province – Wei Liucheng
- Governor of Henan Province – Ji Yunshi
- Governor of Hunan Province – Zhou Bohua
- Governor of Jiangsu Province – Li Chengyu
- Governor of Jiangxi Province – Liang Baohua
- Governor of Jilin Province – Wang Min
- Governor of Liaoning Province – Zhang Wenyue
- Governor of Qinghai Province – Song Xiuyan
- Governor of Shaanxi Province – Chen Deming
- Governor of Shandong Province – Han Yuqun
- Governor of Shanxi Province – Song Xiuyan
- Governor of Sichuan Province – Zhang Baoshun (until July), Yu Youjun (starting July)
- Governor of Yunnan Province – Xu Rongkai
- Governor of Zhejiang Province – Lü Zushan

== Events ==
=== March ===
- Protests in Huashui: environmental protests ran through March and April.
- March 14 – Anti-Secession Law: The People's Republic of China ratifies an anti-secession law, aimed at preventing Taiwan from declaring independence even though it had been independent since 1949.

=== April ===
- April 11 – Anti-Japanese demonstrations in China: 20,000 protesters marching in two cities in southern Guangdong province objecting to a recently amended Japanese schoolbook which allegedly glosses over Japan's imperialist past.
- April 15 - 2005 anti-Japanese demonstrations: Mass demonstrations against Japan took place.
- April 18 – 2005 anti-Japanese demonstrations: Sino-Japanese relations worsen after a meeting between Chinese State Councilor Tang Jiaxuan, Foreign Minister Li Zhaoxing, and Japanese Foreign Minister Nobutaka Machimura in Beijing. China continues to refuse an apology for the increasing number of anti-Japanese protests, and further accuses Japan for handling the issues of history and Taiwan "incorrectly".

=== June ===
- June 11 – Shengyou–Guohua Dingzhou Power Plant dispute: six are killed in a land dispute in a village in Hebei.

=== August ===
- August 12 – The State Council releases the Opinions on Encouraging, Supporting, and Guiding the Development of Individual Businesses, Private Firms, and Other Parts of the Non-State Economy (commonly known as the 36 Articles). The 36 Articles characterize the state-owned economy as the country's "mainstay" while stating that the private sector should also be guided and developed. The 36 Articles also established the principle of equal treatment for state-owned enterprises and private enterprises ion areas where both could operate, although many of these reforms were not thoroughly implemented.
- August 18 – Peace Mission 2005, the first joint China–Russia military exercise, begins its 8-day training on the Shandong peninsula.

=== October ===
- October 12 – The second Chinese spacecraft, Shenzhou 6, is launched, carrying Fei Junlong and Nie Haisheng for 5 days in orbit.
- October 15 – Qinghai-Tibet Railway is completed in China.

=== November ===
- November 13 – Jilin chemical plant explosions 2005: a series of explosions occurred in a chemical Plant in Jilin City. The explosions killed six, injured dozens, and caused the evacuation of tens of thousands of residents. During the incident a large discharge of nitrobenzene went into the Songhua River. Levels of the carcinogen were so high that the entire water supply to Harbin city (pop 3.8M) was cut off for five days between November 21, 2005 and November 26, 2005.
- November 26 – SM City Jinjiang, the second SM Mall in mainland China was opened.

=== Other ===
- Broad & Bright law firm is founded.
- China passed its Renewable Energy Law in 2005.

== Deaths ==
- January 3 — Koo Chen-fu, Taiwanese businessman, diplomat and film producer (b. 1917)
- January 5 — Xu Huizi, general (b. 1932)
- January 6 — Hui Cheung-ching, member of the Legislative Council of Hong Kong (b. 1942)
- January 8 — Song Renqiong, general (b. 1909)
- January 13 — Sun Daguang, politician (b. 1917)
- January 17 — Zhao Ziyang, 3rd Premier of China and 2nd General Secretary of the Chinese Communist Party (b. 1919)
- January 29
  - Zhang Zhenglang, historian (b. 1912)
  - Zhang Taiheng, general (b. 1931)
- February 6 — Duan Xuefu, mathematician (b. 1914)
- February 12 — Shi Yuxiao, general (b. 1933)
- February 18 — Lim Por-yen, Hong Kong industrialist (b. 1914)
- February 19 — Li Baohua, 5th Governor of the People's Bank of China (b. 1909)
- February 23
  - Li Guohao, structural engineer (b. 1913)
  - Feng Yidai, author, editor and translator (b. 1913)
- April 10 — Chen Yifei, classic-style painter, art director and film director (b. 1946)
- April 20 — Joseph Liu Yuanren, Catholic Bishop of the Diocese of Jiangsu (b. 1923)
- April 21 — Zhang Chunqiao, Former Vice Premier of China (b. 1917)
- April 24 — Fei Xiaotong, pioneering Chinese researcher and professor of sociology and anthropology (b. 1910)
- May 11 — Wu Yee-sun, Hong Kong entrepreneur (b. 1900)
- May 26 — Israel Epstein, Polish-born Chinese journalist and author (b. 1915)
- June 4 — Yin Shun, Buddhist monk and scholar (b. 1906)
- June 5 — Rui Xingwen, politician (b. 1927)
- June 30 — Qigong, calligrapher, artist, painter, connoisseur and sinologist (b. 1912)
- July 2 — Gu Yue, actor (b. 1937)
- July 6 — Huang Kun, a well-known Chinese physicist (b. 1919)
- July 9 — Lu Wenfu, contemporary writer (b. 1927)
- July 20 — Yan Wenjing, writer (b. 1915)
- July 22 — Xue Muqiao, economist and politician (b. 1904)
- July 25 — Chen Xinren, diplomat (b. 1915)
- July 28 — Cheng Siyuan, politician (b. 1908)
- August 7 — Li Lili, film actress (b. 1915)
- August 18 — Gao Xiumin, comedy actress (b. 1959)
- August 21 — Li Wei, actor (b. 1919)
- August 24
  - Guo Zhenqing, actor (b. 1927)
  - Liu Baiyu, writer (b. 1916)
- August 30 — Fu Biao, actor (b. 1963)
- September 9 — Xiong Xianghui, high-ranking official in diplomacy and intelligence (b. 1919)
- October 17 — Ba Jin, writer (b. 1904)
- October 26 — Rong Yiren, 5th Vice President of China (b. 1916)
- December 23 — Yao Wenyuan, politician (b. 1931)
- December 24 — Wang Daohan, 2nd Mayor of Shanghai (b. 1915)

== See also ==
- List of Chinese films of 2005
- Chinese Super League 2005
- Hong Kong League Cup 2005–06
