= 2017 in China =

- Decades: 1990s; 2000s; 2010s; 2020s
- See also: Other events of 2017; History of China • Timeline • Years

Events from the year 2017 in China.

== Incumbents ==
- General Secretary of the Chinese Communist Party – Xi Jinping
- President – Xi Jinping
- Vice President – Li Yuanchao
- Premier – Li Keqiang
- Congress chairman – Zhang Dejiang
- Consultative Conference chairman – Yu Zhengsheng

=== Governors ===
- Governor of Anhui Province – Li Guoying
- Governor of Fujian Province – Yu Weiguo (until 2 January), Tang Dengjie (starting 2 January)
- Governor of Gansu Province – Lin Duo (until 11 April), Tang Renjian (starting 11 April)
- Governor of Guangdong Province – Tang Renjian
- Governor of Guizhou Province – Shen Yiqin
- Governor of Hainan Province – Shen Xiaoming
- Governor of Hebei Province – Zhang Qingwei (until March), Xu Qin (starting March)
- Governor of Heilongjiang Province – Lu Hao
- Governor of Henan Province – Chen Run'er
- Governor of Hubei Province – Wang Xiaodong
- Governor of Hunan Province – Xu Dazhe
- Governor of Jiangsu Province – Shi Taifeng (until April), Wu Zhenglong (starting April)
- Governor of Jiangxi Province – Liu Qi (politician, born 1957)
- Governor of Jilin Province – Liu Guozhong
- Governor of Liaoning Province – Chen Qiufa (until October), Tang Yijun (starting October)
- Governor of Qinghai Province – Wang Jianjun
- Governor of Shaanxi Province – Hu Heping
- Governor of Shandong Province – Guo Shuqing (until February), Gong Zheng (starting April 11)
- Governor of Shanxi Province – Lou Yangsheng
- Governor of Sichuan Province – Yin Li
- Governor of Yunnan Province – vacant
- Governor of Zhejiang Province – Che Jun (until April), Yuan Jiajun (starting April)

== Events ==
=== January ===
- 2 January to 8 January – 2017 Shenzhen Open
- 6 January - Fuzhou Metro Line 1 Phase 1 was opened
- 9 January - The state science and technology awarding meeting of the People's Republic of China for 2016 was held

=== June ===
- 16 June – Chinese, Indian, and Bhutanese border tensions skyrocket over the construction of a road in Doklam, a disputed region between Bhutan and China. See Doklam Standoff for more.
- 28 June – The 2017 FIBA 3x3 U18 World Cup begins.

=== July ===
- 2 July – The 2017 FIBA 3x3 U18 World Cup ends.
- 17 July – Chinese internet censors has banned Winnie the Pooh for its alleged resemblance to Xi Jinping.
- 7 July to 6 August – 2017 FIVB Volleyball World Grand Prix

=== August ===
- 8 August:
  - 2017 Jiuzhaigou earthquake, according to Sichuan province government offiocial document report, a Richer Scale 6.5 earthquake hit in Jiuzhaigou County, Sichuan Province, killing 25 persons and injuring 525 persons.
  - According to Sichuan province government official confirmed report, a landslide hit in Puge County, Sichuan Province, 25 person were human fatalities and 4 persons were hurt.
- 28 August:
  - End of the Doklam Standoff as India and China move troops off the border to their original positions.
  - China Guodian Corporation and Shenhua Group were merged, new form name China Energy Investment has start,

=== October ===
- October – start of elections for the 13th National People's Congress
- 18 October to 24 October – 19th National Congress of the Chinese Communist Party
- 26 October to 29 October – 2017 WGC-HSBC Champions

== Deaths ==
- January 14 - Zhou Youguang, developer of Hanyu Pinyin (b. 1906)
- January 15 – Han Peixin, politician (b. 1921)
- February 12 – Ren Xinmin, aerospace engineer (b. 1915)
- February 20 — Huang Feili, conductor and musical educator (b. 1917)
- May 18 — Dai Zijin, aviator (b. 1916)
- June 4 – Zhang Tianfu, agronomist and tea expert. (b. 1910)
- July 4 — Shen Panwen, chemist (b. 1916)
- July 13 - Liu Xiaobo, writer, literary critic, human rights activist and Nobel Peace Prize laureate. (b. 1955)
- October 15 - Deng Ken, politician and younger brother of former paramount leader Deng Xiaoping. (b. 1911)

== See also ==
- List of Chinese films of 2017
