= 1989 in China =

- Decades: 1960s; 1970s; 1980s; 1990s; 2000s
- See also: Other events of 1989; History of China • Timeline • Years

Events in the year 1989 in the People's Republic of China.

== Incumbents ==
- General Secretary of the Chinese Communist Party - Zhao Ziyang until June 24, Jiang Zemin
- President – Yang Shangkun
- Premier – Li Peng
- Vice President – Wang Zhen
- Vice Premier – Yao Yilin
- Congress Chairman - Wan Li
- Conference Chairman - Li Xiannian

=== Governors ===
- Governor of Anhui Province – Li Rongling then Fu Xishou
- Governor of Fujian Province – Wang Zhaoguo
- Governor of Gansu Province – Jia Zhijie
- Governor of Guangdong Province – Ye Xuanping
- Governor of Guizhou Province – Wang Zhaowen
- Governor of Hainan Province – Liu Jianfeng
- Governor of Hebei Province – Yue Qifeng
- Governor of Heilongjiang Province – Hou Jie then Shao Qihui
- Governor of Henan Province – Cheng Weigao
- Governor of Hubei Province – Guo Zhenqian
- Governor of Hunan Province – Xiong Qingquan then Chen Bangzhu
- Governor of Jiangsu Province – Gu Xiulian then Chen Huanyou
- Governor of Jiangxi Province – Wu Guanzheng
- Governor of Jilin Province – He Zhukang then Wang Zhongyu
- Governor of Liaoning Province – Li Changchun
- Governor of Qinghai Province – Song Ruixiang then Jin Jipeng
- Governor of Shaanxi Province – Hou Zongbin
- Governor of Shandong Province – Jiang Chunyun then Zhao Zhihao
- Governor of Shanxi Province – Wang Senhao
- Governor of Sichuan Province – Zhang Haoruo
- Governor of Yunnan Province – Li Jiating
- Governor of Zhejiang Province – Shen Zulun

== Events ==
=== May ===
- May 13 — Mikhail Gorbachev visits China, the first Soviet leader to do so since the 1960s.
- May 19 — Tiananmen Square protests of 1989: Zhao Ziyang meets the demonstrators in Tiananmen Square.
- May 20 — Tiananmen Square protests of 1989: The Chinese government declares martial law in Beijing.
- May 30 — Tiananmen Square protests of 1989: The 10 m (33 ft) high Goddess of Democracy statue is unveiled in Tiananmen Square by student demonstrators.

=== June ===
- June 4 — Tiananmen Square massacre takes place in Beijing on the army's approach to the square, and the final stand-off in the square is covered live on television.
  - Hardliners: Li Peng (4th Premier of the People's Republic of China), Jiang Zemin, Chen Yun (2nd Chairman of the Central Advisory Commission & Eight Elders), Yang Shangkun (4th President of the People's Republic of China & Eight Elders), Li Xiannian (3rd President of the People's Republic of China & Eight Elders), Bo Yibo (Eight Elders), Yao Yilin (5th First Vice Premier of the People's Republic of China), Chi Haotian (Vice Chairman of the Central Military Commission), Liu Huaqing (Vice Chairman of the Central Military Commission), Li Ximing (CCP Beijing Committee Secretary), Chen Xitong (Mayor of Beijing), Deng Xiaoping (paramount leader), Hu Jintao.
  - Moderates: Zhao Ziyang (General Secretary of the Chinese Communist Party), Wan Li (Eight Elders), Tian Jiyun, Wu Xueqian, Xi Zhongxun (Eight Elders), Wen Jiabao.
  - Intellectuals: Liu Xiaobo (Nobel Peace Prize laureate), Dai Qing (adopted daughter of Ye Jianying).
    - Student leaders: Wang Dan, Wu'erkaixi, Chai Ling, Shen Tong, Liu Gang, Feng Congde, Li Lu, Wang Youcai.
- June 24 — Jiang Zemin becomes General Secretary of the Chinese Communist Party.

== Births ==
- January 18 — Li Huzhao, Paralympic athlete
- January 21 — Zhang Shuai, professional hockey player
- February 20 — Zhang Yangyang, mountain hopper
- March 18 — Lü Zhiwu, swimmer
- July 12 — Wang Xinnan, rower
- December 21 — Fang Yuting, archer

== Deaths ==
- January 11 — Hai Deng, Buddhist monk, martial artist and 32nd Abbot of Shaolin Monastery (b. 1902)
- January 28 — Choekyi Gyaltsen, 10th Panchen Lama (b. 1938)
- February 22 — Zhu Liangcai, general in the People's Liberation Army (b. 1900)
- March 3 — Dong Qiwu, general in the People's Liberation Army (b. 1899)
- March 20 — Huang Wei, Nationalist military general (b. 1904)
- March 26 — Hai Zi, poet (b. 1964)
- March 28 — Fang Chih, high-ranking Nationalist official (b. 1895)
- March 29 — Xiao Jingguang, military leader (b. 1903)
- April 15 — Hu Yaobang, 7th General Secretary of the Chinese Communist Party (b. 1915)
- April 23 — Hu Die, Chinese actress (b. 1908)
- April 24 — Li Jingquan, 1st Secretary of the Sichuan Provincial Committee of the Chinese Communist Party (b. 1909)
- May 11 — Xiao Wangdong, lieutenant general in the People's Liberation Army (b. 1910)
- June 9 — Huang Yan, 2nd Governor of Anhui (b. 1912)
- June 14 — Wei Guoqing, government official, military officer and political commissar (b. 1913)
- July 8 — Hui Yuyu, 2nd Governor of Jiangsu (b. 1909)
- July 28 — Fu Zhong, general in the People's Liberation Army (b. 1900)
- July 31 — Zhou Yang, literary theorist, translator and Marxist thinker (b. 1908)
- August 17 — Lin Tie, 1st Secretary of the Hebei Provincial Committee of the Chinese Communist Party (b. 1904)
- August 27 — Burhan Shahidi, Chinese Tatar politician (b. 1894)
- September 20 — Chen Boda, Chinese Communist political theorist (b. 1904)
- October 11 — Zeng Xianzhi, revolutionary and politician (b. 1910)
- November 12 — Mao Yisheng, structural engineer and social activist (b. 1896)
- November 29 — Yam Kim-fai, Cantonese opera actress (b. 1913)
- December 5 — Li Keran, a renowned contemporary Chinese painter (b. 1907)
- December 10 — Huang Zhen, politician (b. 1909)
- December 24 — Song Peizhang, 4th Governor of Anhui (b. 1919)

== See also ==
- 1989 in Chinese film
