= 2003 in China =

- Decades: 1980s; 1990s; 2000s; 2010s; 2020s
- See also: Other events of 2003; History of China • Timeline • Years

Events in the year 2003 in China.

== Incumbents ==
- Party General Secretary - Hu Jintao
- President – Jiang Zemin to March 15, Hu Jintao
- Premier – Zhu Rongji to March 16, Wen Jiabao
- Vice President – Hu Jintao to March 15, Zeng Qinghong
- Vice Premier – Li Lanqing to March 6, Huang Ju
- Congress Chairman - Li Peng to March 15, Wu Bangguo
- Conference Chairman - Li Ruihuan to March 14, Jia Qinglin

=== Governors ===
- Governor of Anhui Province – Wang Jinshan
- Governor of Fujian Province – Lu Zhangong
- Governor of Gansu Province – Lu Hao
- Governor of Guangdong Province – Lu Ruihua then Huang Huahua
- Governor of Guizhou Province – Shi Xiushi
- Governor of Hainan Province – Wang Xiaofeng then Wei Liucheng
- Governor of Hebei Province – Ji Yunshi
- Governor of Heilongjiang Province – Song Fatang then Zhang Zuoji
- Governor of Henan Province – Li Keqiang then Li Chengyu
- Governor of Hubei Province – Luo Qingquan
- Governor of Hunan Province – Zhang Yunchuan then Zhou Bohua
- Governor of Jiangsu Province – Liang Baohua
- Governor of Jiangxi Province – Huang Zhiquan
- Governor of Jilin Province – Wang Min (until December), Han Changfu (starting December)
- Governor of Liaoning Province – Bo Xilai
- Governor of Qinghai Province – Song Xiuyan
- Governor of Shaanxi Province – Jia Zhibang
- Governor of Shandong Province – Zhang Gaoli then Han Yuqun
- Governor of Shanxi Province – Liu Zhenhua
- Governor of Sichuan Province – Zhang Zhongwei
- Governor of Yunnan Province – Xu Rongkai
- Governor of Zhejiang Province – Xi Jinping (until January), Lü Zushan (starting January)

== Events ==
=== January ===
- January 7 to January 8 – Hefei student protests occur, which were described as the largest student protests since the Tiananmen Square protests of 1989.

=== February ===
- February 24 – 2003 Bachu earthquake: An earthquake measuring 6.3 in magnitude occurred in the Xinjiang Autonomous Region in northwest China, killing 191 people and 291 hospitalised. Almost 10,000 homes were leveled by the earthquake.

=== March ===
- March 14 – A smartphone and portable audio player brand, Meizu was founded by Jack Wong in Zhuhai, Guangdong Province.
- March 15 – Hu Jintao becomes President of the People's Republic of China, replacing Jiang Zemin.

=== June ===
- June 1 – The People's Republic of China begins filling the lake behind the massive Three Gorges Dam, raising the water level near the dam over 100 meters.

=== October ===
- October 15 – China successfully launches Shenzhou 5, their first crewed space mission, becoming the third country in the world to have independent human spaceflight capability after the Soviet Union and the United States.

=== December ===
- December 23 - A PetroChina Chuandongbei natural gas field explosion in Chongqing, 234 people lives.

== Births ==
- 6 March – Long Daoyi, Chinese diver

== Deaths ==
- January 12 — Wang Tieya, jurist (b. 1913)
- January 22 — Tan Qilong, politician (b. 1913)
- February 11
  - Ma Sanli, comedian (b. 1914)
  - Luke Chia-Liu Yuan, physicist (b. 1912)
- March 15 — Li Xuefeng, 2nd Secretary of the Beijing Municipal Committee of the Chinese Communist Party (b. 1907)
- March 17 — Su Buqing, mathematician, educator and poet (b. 1902)
- April 1 — Leslie Cheung, Hong Kong singer and actor (b. 1956)
- April 9 — Wu Zuguang, playwright, film director and social critic (b. 1917)
- April 16 — Long Shujin, 3rd Chairman of Xinjiang (b. 1910)
- May 31 — Li Lin, physicist (b. 1923)
- June 17 — Zheng Wenguang, science fiction author (b. 1929)
- July 5 — Zhang Aiping, 6th Minister of National Defense of China (b. 1910)
- October 23 — Soong Mei-ling, political figure and wife of Chiang Kai-shek (b. 1898)
- October 25 — Yao Guang, diplomat, foreign ambassador (born 1921)
- November 15 — T. Y. Lin, Chinese-born civil engineer (born 1912)
- November 16 — Richard Lam, Cantopop lyricist (b. 1948)
- November 19 — Shi Zhecun, essayist, poet and short story writer (b. 1905)
- November 24 — Saifuddin Azizi, 4th Secretary of the Xinjiang Uyghur Autonomous Regional Committee of the Chinese Communist Party (b. 1915)
- November 25 — Zhang Honggen, international football player and coach (b. 1935)
- December 9 — Blackie Ko, Taiwanese film director, producer, stuntman, singer and actor (b. 1953)
- December 10 — Oswald Cheung, Hong Kong barrister (b. 1922)
- December 13 — Xie Tian, actor and director (b. 1914)
- December 27 — Ying Ruocheng, actor, director and playwright (b. 1929)
- December 30 — Anita Mui, Hong Kong singer and actress (b. 1963)

== See also ==
- List of Chinese films of 2003
- Hong Kong League Cup 2003–04
