= 2006 in China =

- Decades: 1980s; 1990s; 2000s; 2010s; 2020s
- See also: Other events of 2006; History of China • Timeline • Years

Events in the year 2006 in China.

== Incumbents ==
- Party General Secretary – Hu Jintao
- President – Hu Jintao
- Premier – Wen Jiabao
- Vice President – Zeng Qinghong
- Vice Premier – Huang Ju
- Congress Chairman – Wu Bangguo
- Conference Chairman – Jia Qinglin

=== Governors ===
- Governor of Anhui Province – Wang Jinshan
- Governor of Fujian Province – Huang Xiaojing
- Governor of Gansu Province – Lu Hao (until this year)
- Governor of Guangdong Province – Huang Huahua
- Governor of Guizhou Province – Shi Xiushi then Lin Shusen
- Governor of Hainan Province – Wei Liucheng
- Governor of Hebei Province – Ji Yunshi then Guo Gengmao
- Governor of Heilongjiang Province – Zhang Zuoji
- Governor of Henan Province – Li Chengyu
- Governor of Hubei Province – Luo Qingquan
- Governor of Hunan Province – Zhou Bohua then Zhou Qiang
- Governor of Jiangsu Province – Liang Baohua
- Governor of Jiangxi Province – Huang Zhiquan
- Governor of Jilin Province – Wang Min (until December), Han Changfu (starting December)
- Governor of Liaoning Province – Zhang Wenyue
- Governor of Qinghai Province – Song Xiuyan
- Governor of Shaanxi Province – Chen Deming then Yuan Chunqing
- Governor of Shandong Province – Han Yuqun
- Governor of Shanxi Province – Yu Youjun
- Governor of Sichuan Province – Zhang Zhongwei
- Governor of Yunnan Province – Xu Rongkai
- Governor of Zhejiang Province – Lü Zushan

== Events ==
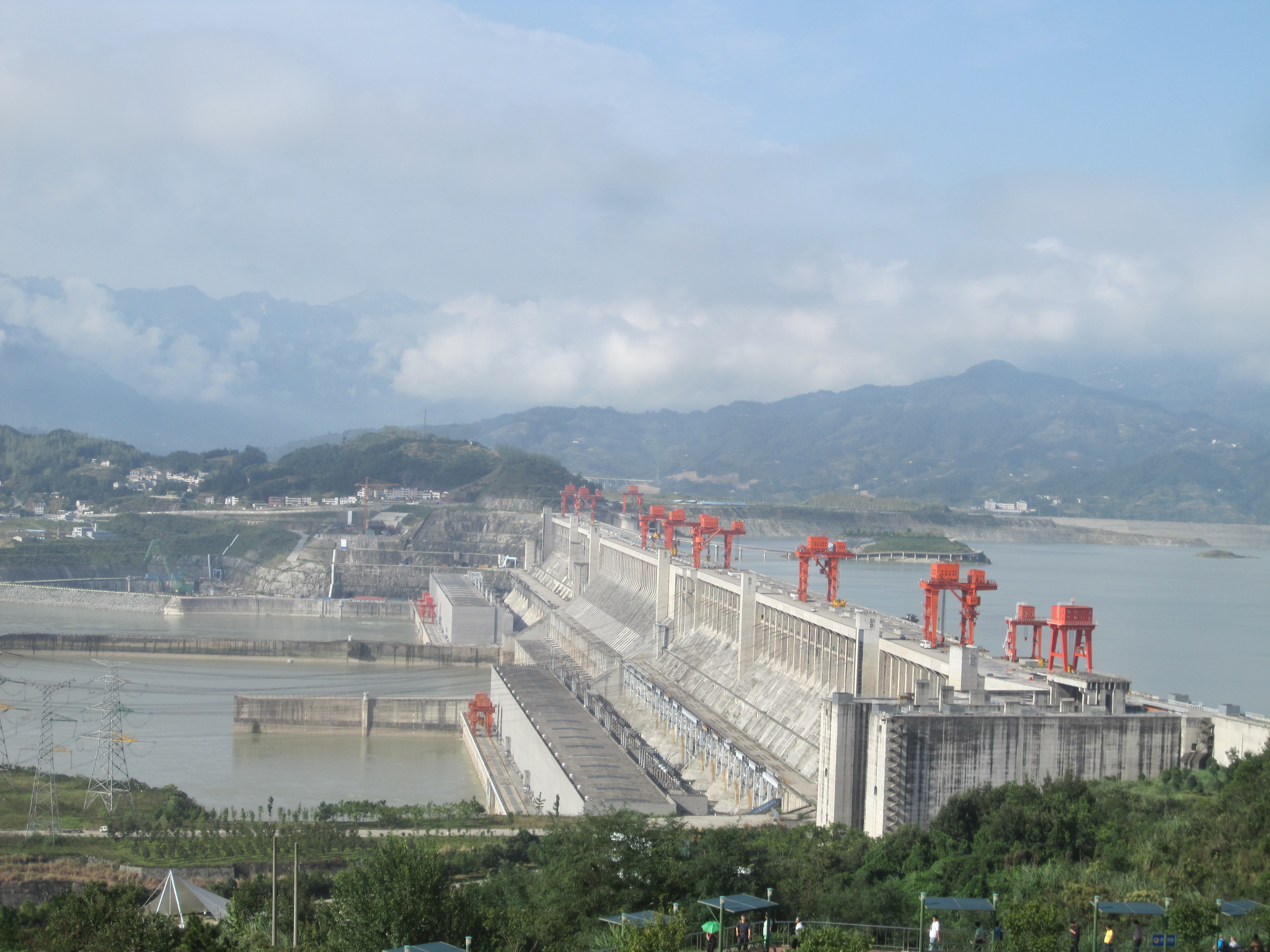
The construction of the Three Gorges Dam wall, the largest dam in the world, is completed

=== March ===
- March 3: The 2006 Chinese People's Political Consultative Conference opens in Beijing.

=== April ===
- April 14: A man disfigured in a bear attack becomes the first in China to have a face transplant.
- April 30: 24 miners killed in a mine explosion in the Chinese province of Shaanxi.

=== May ===
- May 11: Baidu Baike, a Chinese collaborative online encyclopedia, is launched in People's Republic of China by Baidu.com, modelled on Wikipedia but heavily self censored. Wikipedia is largely inaccessible without a proxy in China.
- May 20: The construction of the Three Gorges Dam wall, the largest dam in the world, is completed in the People's Republic of China.

=== July ===
- July 1: The Qingzang railway launches a trial operation, making Tibet the last province-level entity of China to have a conventional railway.
- July 6: The Nathula Pass between India and China, sealed during the Sino-Indian War, re-opens for trade after 44 years.
- July 7: An explosion in the village of Dongzhai village in Shanxi province in north China kills 43 people.
- July 11: Liu Xiang of China sets a new World Record for the 110 metres hurdles at the Super Grand Prix in Lausanne with a time of 12.88 seconds.
- July 22: July 2006 Yunnan earthquake: An earthquake measuring 5.1-5.2 in magnitude hits a mountainous region of Yunnan Province in south China killing at least 18-19 people and injuring at least 60 more.
- July 27: More than 80 people dead and missing as a result of Typhoon Kaemi.

=== August ===
- August 10: More than 1.5 million Chinese evacuate while Super Typhoon Saomai, the strongest to land in China in 50 years, makes landfall in Wenzhou, Zhejiang.

=== November ===
- November 13: Nanshan Colliery disaster: A colliery explosion in Shanxi province in northern China kills at least 24 miners.

== Births ==
- May 24 — Zeng Liqi, professional golfer

== Deaths ==
- February 13 — Wang Xuan, computer scientist (b. 1937)
- February 22 — Bill Tung, Hong Kong actor and horse racing commentator (b. 1933)
- February 25 — Liang Lingguang, 11th Governor of Guangdong (b. 1916)
- March 6 — Ruth Weiss, Austrian-Chinese educator and journalist (b. 1908)
- March 11 — Liu Zhijian, lieutenant general (b. 1912)
- March 17 — Yuan Baojing, billionaire (b. 1966)
- May 12 — Huang Xinting, lieutenant general (b. 1913)
- September 14 — Rao Shoukun, lieutenant general (b. 1915)
- September 27 — Guan Xuezeng, actor (b. 1922)
- October 5 — Liao Hansheng, politician (b. 1911)
- October 13 — Wang Guangmei, politician, philanthropist and wife of Liu Shaoqi (b. 1921)
- October 28 — Henry Fok, Hong Kong entrepreneur and politician (b. 1923)
- November 20 — Hong Xuezhi, general and politician (b. 1913)
- November 23 — Chen-Lu Tsou, biochemist (b. 1923)
- December 11 — Lo Tak-shing, former President of Law Society of Hong Kong (b. 1935)
- December 20 — Ma Ji, actor (b. 1934)

== See also ==
- List of Chinese films of 2006
- Chinese Super League 2006
- Hong Kong League Cup 2006–07
