= 2001 in China =

- Decades: 1980s; 1990s; 2000s; 2010s; 2020s
- See also: Other events of 2001; History of China • Timeline • Years

Events in the year 2001 in China.

== Incumbents ==
- Party General Secretary – Jiang Zemin
- President – Jiang Zemin
- Premier – Zhu Rongji
- Vice President – Hu Jintao
- Vice Premier – Li Lanqing
- Congress Chairman – Li Peng
- Conference Chairman – Li Ruihuan

=== Governors ===
- Governor of Anhui Province – Xu Zhonglin
- Governor of Fujian Province – Xi Jinping
- Governor of Gansu Province – Song Zhaosu then Lu Hao
- Governor of Guangdong Province – Lu Ruihua
- Governor of Guizhou Province – Qian Yunlu then Shi Xiushi
- Governor of Hainan Province – Wang Xiaofeng
- Governor of Hebei Province – Niu Maosheng
- Governor of Heilongjiang Province – Song Fatang
- Governor of Henan Province – Li Keqiang
- Governor of Hubei Province – Jiang Zhuping then Zhang Guoguang
- Governor of Hunan Province – Chu Bo then Zhang Yunchuan
- Governor of Jiangsu Province – Ji Yunshi
- Governor of Jiangxi Province – Shu Shengyou then Huang Zhiquan
- Governor of Jilin Province – Hong Hu
- Governor of Liaoning Province – Zhang Guoguang then Bo Xilai
- Governor of Qinghai Province – Zhao Leji
- Governor of Shaanxi Province – Cheng Andong
- Governor of Shandong Province – Zhang Gaoli then Han Yuqun
- Governor of Shanxi Province – Liu Zhenhua
- Governor of Sichuan Province – Zhang Zhongwei
- Governor of Yunnan Province – Li Jiating (until June), Xu Rongkai (starting June)
- Governor of Zhejiang Province – Chai Songyue

== Events ==
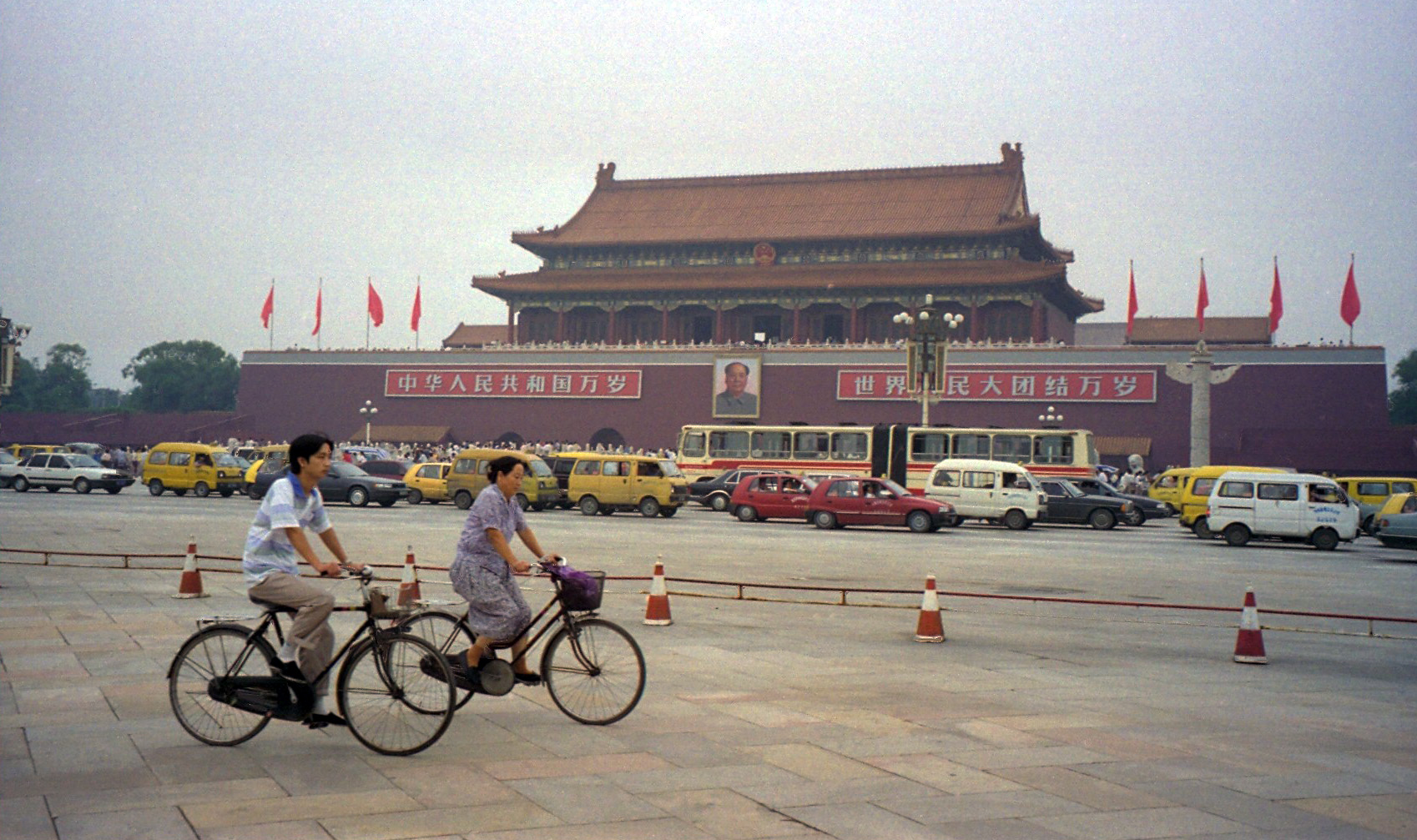
Tiananmen Square

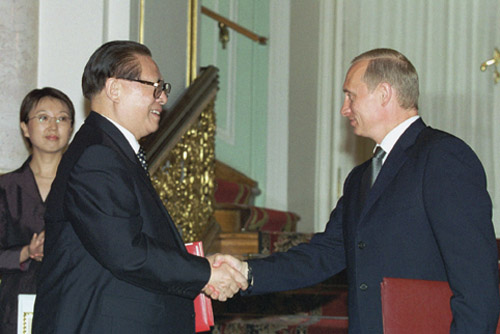
Jiang Zemin and Vladimir Putin after signing the Treaty of Good-Neighborliness and Friendly Cooperation

=== January ===
- January 9 – Shenzhou 2, an unmanned Chinese spacecraft, was launched.

=== March ===
- March 16 – Shijiazhuang bombings

=== April ===
- April 1 – Hainan Island incident: a mid-air collision between an EP-3E United States Navy spyplane and a People's Liberation Army Navy People's Liberation Army J-8II interceptor fighter jet 70 miles (110 km) away from the PRC-controlled island of Hainan. The collision caused the death of a PRC pilot, while the EP-3 was forced to make an unauthorized emergency landing at Lingshui airfield. The incident results in an international dispute between the United States and the People's Republic of China.
- April 11 – Hainan Island incident: The detained crew of a United States EP-3E aircraft that landed in Hainan, People's Republic of China, after a collision with an F-8 fighter, is released.

=== July ===
- July 13 – The International Olympic Committee awards the 2008 Summer Olympics to Beijing, People's Republic of China
- July 16 – The People's Republic of China and the Russian Federation sign the Treaty of Good-Neighborliness and Friendly Cooperation.

=== December ===
- December 13 - SM City Xiamen, the first SM Mall in mainland China was opened.
- December 27 – The People's Republic of China is granted permanent normal trade status with the United States.

=== Full date unknown ===
- Xiao-i (Shanghai Xiaoi Robot Technology Co. Ltd), an artificial intelligence company is founded.

== Births ==
- February 21 - Yang Peiyi, singer
- March 12 – Shi Cong, gymnast
- November 22 – Zhong Chenle, singer

== See also ==
- List of Chinese films of 2001
- Hong Kong League Cup 2001–02
