= 2004 in China =

- Decades: 1980s; 1990s; 2000s; 2010s; 2020s
- See also: Other events of 2004; History of China • Timeline • Years

Events in the year 2004 in China.

== Incumbents ==
- General Secretary of the Chinese Communist Party – Hu Jintao
- President – Hu Jintao
- Premier – Wen Jiabao
- Vice President – Zeng Qinghong
- Vice Premier – Huang Ju
- National People's Congress Chairman – Wu Bangguo
- Conference Chairman – Jia Qinglin

=== Governors ===
- Governor of Anhui Province – Wang Jinshan
- Governor of Fujian Province – Lu Zhangong then Huang Xiaojing
- Governor of Guangdong Province – Lu Hao
- Governor of Guizhou Province – Huang Huahua
- Governor of Hainan Province – Shi Xiushi
- Governor of Hebei Province – Wei Liucheng
- Governor of Henan Province – Ji Yunshi
- Governor of Hunan Province – Zhou Bohua
- Governor of Jiangsu Province – Li Chengyu
- Governor of Jiangxi Province – Huang Zhiquan
- Governor of Jilin Province – Hong Hu then Wang Min
- Governor of Liaoning Province – Bo Xilai (until February), Zhang Wenyue (starting February)
- Governor of Qinghai Province – Zhao Leji then Yang Chuantang
- Governor of Shaanxi Province – Jia Zhibang (until October), Chen Deming (starting October)
- Governor of Shandong Province – Han Yuqun
- Governor of Shanxi Province – Liu Zhenhua (until January), Zhang Baoshun (starting January)
- Governor of Sichuan Province – Zhang Zhongwei
- Governor of Yunnan Province: Xu Rongkai
- Governor of Zhejiang Province – Lü Zushan

== Events ==
In 2004, China signed the UNESCO Convention for the Safeguarding of the Intangible Cultural Heritage.

=== February ===
- February 15 – Two fires sweep through China, one in a shopping center and the other in a temple, killing at least 90 and injuring 71.

=== March ===
- China amends its Constitution.

=== April ===
- April 13 – Shanghai modifies its interpretation of the People's Republic of China's One Child Policy, allowing all divorced residents who remarry to have a second child without penalty.

=== September ===
- September 19 - Hu Jintao becomes Chairman of the Central Military Commission.

=== October ===
- October 21 – In Xinmi, China, a gas explosion in a coal mine kills 62 people; 86 are still missing.

=== November ===
- November 1 – Martial law is imposed in parts of China's Henan province after fighting between Hui and Han Chinese ethnic groups kills between 7 and 148 people.
- November 26 – A man kills eight and injures four people with a knife at a Chinese high school in Ruzhou, Henan.
- November 28 – A coal mine explosion in China kills over 150.

=== December ===
- December 3 – The People's Republic of China launches a new long-range nuclear submarine and an accompanying class of ballistic missiles, with a range in excess of 7,400 km (4,600 mi), developed by the People's Liberation Army.

== Deaths ==
- February 14 – Yang Chengwu, Chinese military strategist
- March 23 – Chen Zhongwei, Chinese physician. One of the pioneers of the process of reattaching severed limbs.

== See also ==
- List of Chinese films of 2004
- Chinese Super League 2004
- Hong Kong League Cup 2004–05
