= Ge Hongsheng =

Chinese politician (1931–2020)

Ge Hongsheng (Chinese: 葛洪升; pinyin: Gě Hóngshēng; 1931 – 30 January 2020) was a politician of the People's Republic of China, and the former Governor of Zhejiang.

== Early life ==
In 1931, Ge was born in Jü County, Shandong Province, China.

== Career ==
Ge joined the Chinese Communist Party in 1948. In 1988, he was elected the vice secretary of Zhejiang Provincial Committee of the Chinese Communist Party. In November, 1990, Ge was appointed as vice governor and the acting governor of Zhejiang. He was confirmed as governor in March 1991 and served in this post till February 1993. In March 1998, Ge was elected vice director of Finance and Economic Committee of 9th National People's Congress.

Ge was an alternate member of 13th Central Committee of the Chinese Communist Party, and a standing committee member of 9th National People's Congress.

He died on 30 January 2020 at age 88.

Political offices
Preceded by Shen Zulun	Governor of Zhejiang; 1990–1991	Succeeded by Wan Xueyuan
