= Broad & Bright =

Corporate law firm headquartered in Beijing, China

- Headquarters: Beijing, China
- No. of offices: 6
- No. of employees: Approximately 50 lawyers
- Major practice areas: General practice
- Key people: Liu Hongchuan (Managing partner)
- Date founded: 2005 (Beijing)
- Website: Broad & Bright

Broad & Bright is a corporate law firm headquartered in Beijing, China. It currently has offices in Beijing, Shanghai, Guangzhou, Hong Kong, Tokyo and Los Angeles.

== History ==
Broad & Bright was founded in Beijing in 2005 by Yuan Changchuan, Liu Hongchuan, Ji Jun and Feng Yao.

In January 2011, Broad & Bright hired a team of nine partners and associates from the Shanghai office of Run Ming.

Broad & Bright joined the international multidisciplinary professional services network MSI Global Alliance in March 2012, becoming the only China-based member.

== Main practice areas ==
Broad & Bright's main practice areas include:

- capital markets;
- corporate;
- employment;
- financial services regulation;
- insurance;
- intellectual property;
- litigation and dispute resolution;
- mergers and acquisitions;
- real estate;
- restructuring and insolvency; and
- tax.

== See also ==
- List of largest Chinese law firms
- Legal History of China
- Chinese law
