= 1916 in China =

- Decades: 1890s; 1900s; 1910s; 1920s; 1930s
- See also: Other events of 1916; History of China • Timeline • Years

Events in the year 1916 in China.

== Incumbents ==
- President: Yuan Shikai (until 6 June), Li Yuanhong (from 7 June)
- Vice President: Feng Guozhang
- Premier: Lu Zhengxiang (until 22 March), Xu Shichang (from 22 March to 23 April), Duan Qirui (from 23 April)

== Events ==
- National Protection War
- 22 March – Disestablishment of the Empire of China (1915–16)
- 21 September – Establishment of the Vicariate Apostolic of Eastern Honan
- 30 October – Vice-presidential election

== Births ==
=== January ===
- January 9 — Wang Dongxing, military commander and politician (d. 2015)
- January 21 — Xiao Hua, general (d. 1985)

=== February ===
- February 26 — Fang Yi, communist revolutionary, diplomat, and high-ranking politician (d. 1997)

=== March ===
- March 10 — Xu Jiatun, politician and dissident (d. 2017)
- March 26 — Dai Zijin, aviator (d. 2017)

=== April ===
- April 6 — Zhuo Lin, third and last wife of Deng Xiaoping (d. 2009)
- April 15 — Ren Jiyu, philosopher (d. 2009)

=== May ===
- May 1 — Rong Yiren, 5th Vice President of China (d. 2005)
- May 4 — Li Desheng, general (d. 2011)

=== June ===
- June 6 — Ruan Posheng, politician (d. 2017)

=== July ===
- July 16 — Sudono Salim, Indonesian banker and businessman (d. 2012)

=== September ===
- September 7 — Shen Panwen, chemist (d. 2017)

=== October ===
- October 1 — Liu Huaqing, revolutionary and an admiral of the People's Liberation Army Navy (d. 2011)
- October 6
  - Chiang Wei-kuo, Nationalist army general and adopted son of Chiang Kai-shek (d. 1997)
  - Xie Xuegong, politician (d. 1993)

=== December ===
- December 1 — Wan Li, 5th Chairman of the Standing Committee of the National People's Congress (d. 2015)
- December 5 — Lin Hujia, politician (d. 2018)

=== Date unknown ===
- Wan Xiaotang, politician (d. 1966)
- Chen Weida, politician and educator (d. 1990)

== Deaths ==
- March 15 — Wei Guangtao, Qing dynasty politician (b. 1837)
- April 27 — Sheng Xuanhuai, tycoon, politician and educator (b. 1844)
- May 18 — Chen Qimei, revolutionary activist and key figure of the Green Gang (b.1878)
- June 6 — Yuan Shikai, general and statesman (b.1859)
- October 31 — Huang Xing, revolutionary leader and politician (b.1874)
- November 8 — Cai E, revolutionary leader and general (b.1882)
