= 2012 in China =

- Decades: 1990s; 2000s; 2010s; 2020s
- See also: Other events of 2012; History of China • Timeline • Years

Events in the year 2012 in China.

== Incumbents ==
- General Secretary of the Chinese Communist Party – Xi Jinping (from 15 Nov)
- President – Hu Jintao
- Premier – Wen Jiabao
- Vice President – Xi Jinping
- Vice Premier – Li Keqiang
- Congress Chairman – Wu Bangguo
- Conference Chairman – Jia Qinglin

=== Governors ===
- Governor of Anhui Province – Li Bin
- Governor of Fujian Province – Su Shulin
- Governor of Gansu Province – Liu Weiping
- Governor of Guangdong Province – Zhu Xiaodan
- Governor of Guizhou Province – Zhao Kezhi (until December), Chen Min'er (starting December)
- Governor of Hainan Province – Jiang Dingzhi
- Governor of Hebei Province – Zhang Qingwei
- Governor of Heilongjiang Province: – Wang Xiankui
- Governor of Henan Province – Guo Gengmao
- Governor of Hubei Province – Wang Guosheng
- Governor of Hunan Province – Xu Shousheng
- Governor of Jiangsu Province – Li Xueyong
- Governor of Jiangxi Province – Lu Xinshe
- Governor of Jilin Province – Wang Rulin (until December), Bayanqolu (starting December)
- Governor of Liaoning Province – Chen Zhenggao
- Governor of Qinghai Province – Luo Huining
- Governor of Shaanxi Province – Zhao Zhengyong (until December), Lou Qinjian (starting December)
- Governor of Shandong Province – Jiang Daming
- Governor of Shanxi Province – Wang Jun (until December), Li Xiaopeng (starting December)
- Governor of Sichuan Province – Jiang Jufeng
- Governor of Yunnan Province: Li Jiheng
- Governor of Zhejiang Province – Xia Baolong (until December), Li Qiang (starting December)

== Events ==
=== January ===
- January 15 - 2012 Guangxi cadmium spill
- January 17 – Wanggang village rally
- January 22 – Kong Qingdong comment and Early 2012 Hong Kong protests
- January 30 – Ganzhou Ningdu County riot with 5000 citizens

=== February ===
- February 1 - Guizhentang Pharmaceutical company IPO controversy
- February 8 -
  - Chongqing public security bureau head Wang Lijun seek political asylum in US consulate.
  - Cross-strait language database introduced by both sides of strait.
- February 11 - Elections in Wukan following the Protests of Wukan
- February 22 - Chinese coast guard opens fire on Vietnamese ships at Paracel Islands with no casualties reported.
- February 28 - Terrorists kill 15 people in Yecheng, Xinjiang.

=== March ===
- March 1 –
  - Guangdong National Language Regulations
  - Hong Kong mainland China driving scheme
- March 14 - Amendments to the Criminal Procedure Law of the PRC was passed by the National People's Congress.
- March 15 - Bo Xilai was removed from his post as Chongqing Party Secretary.

=== April ===
- April 8 – 10 – The Philippine Navy spotted Chinese fishermen fishing on the disputed Scarborough Shoal and attempted to detain the fishermen on April 10 but was blocked by the Chinese maritime surveillance ship which led to a diplomatic standoff over the shoal and the further severance of Chinese ties with the Philippines.
- April 10 - The Chinese Communist Party suspends the Politburo membership of former senior official Bo Xilai, while his wife Gu Kailai is named as a suspect in the murder of a British businessman.
- April 19 - In golf, 13-year-old Chinese Guan Tian-lang becomes the youngest player to compete on the PGA European Tour when he bogeys at the Volvo China Open.
- April 28 - Blind Chinese human rights activist Chen Guangcheng – who fled from house arrest – reportedly takes refuge in the U.S. embassy in Beijing.

=== May ===
- May 7 - South Korea seizes thousands of smuggled capsules from Northeastern People's Republic of China filled with powdered human flesh.
- May 11 - Chinese scientists use quantum teleportation to transmit photons over a distance of 97 kilometres (60 mi) – a world record for quantum teleportation.
- May 13 -
  - Torrential rainfall and flooding in China's Hunan Province destroys a bridge and 3,500 homes, leading to the evacuation of 28,000 people in Pingjiang County.
  - Chinese security tsar and Politburo Standing Committee member Zhou Yongkang reportedly transfers his security-related duties to Minister of Public Security Meng Jianzhu, following the Bo Xilai scandal.
- May 16 - China Central Television Headquarters in Beijing is completed, a decade after its design by OMA.
- May 19 - At least 20 people are killed in an explosion in a road tunnel being constructed in central China.
- May 20 - Two women in Jieyang, Guangdong, PRC, are executed for counterfeiting nearly 300 million yuan RMB.

=== June ===
- June 16 – 22 - 4th Straits Forum
- June 24 - China successfully carries out its first manual docking of a spacecraft between the Shenzhou 9 capsule and Tiangong-1 station.
- June 29 - Tianjin Airlines Flight GS7554 from Hotan Airport, Embraer E-190, to Ürümqi Diwopu International Airport, passengers and crew members thwart an attempt to hijack a plane in the western Chinese province of Xinjiang, local authorities say.
- June 30 - Fire breaks out in a mall in Ji County, Tianjin, killing 10 people, all of which are female. Many netizens accuse the authority of a cover-up and believe, based on unconfirmed reports, that hundreds may have perished during the fire.

=== July ===
- July 21 - Flash flooding in Beijing and northern Hebei kills 79 people in the worst-ever storm to hit the Beijing area.

=== August ===
- August 19 - Massive anti-Japanese protest takes place in many Chinese cities, following the landings of several Hong Kong and Japanese activists on the disputed Senkaku Islands.

=== September ===
- September 7 - Twin earthquake on the border between Yunnan and Guizhou kills at least 81 people, mostly in Yiliang, Zhaotong.
- September 15 – 19 - Second wave of anti-Japanese protests erupts in at least 19 cities in China. Xi Jinping re-appears after a two-week absence.

=== October ===
- October 4 - Landslide buries at least 19 people in the Southwestern province of Yunnan

=== November ===
- November 8 – 14 - The 18th National Congress of Chinese Communist Party is held in the Great Hall of the People in Beijing. On November 15, Xi Jinping is chosen as the new General Secretary of the Chinese Communist Party. He now also leads the Central Military Commission after Hu Jintao hands over the chairmanship to Xi.

=== December ===
- December 14
  - 23 children and an elderly woman were injured during a stabbing incident.
  - SM City Chongqing, the sixth SM Mall in mainland China was opened.
