= Li Guoping =

Chinese mathematician

Li Guoping (Chinese: 李国平; November 15, 1910 – February 8, 1996) was a Chinese mathematician. He was a member of the Chinese Academy of Sciences.
