= Duan Xuefu =

Chinese mathematician (1914–2005)

Duan Xuefu (Chinese: 段学复; July 29, 1914 – February 6, 2005) was a Chinese mathematician, who was a member of the Chinese Academy of Sciences.
