= Sino-Pack =

Annual packaging product exhibition in China

Sino-Pack is an exhibition of packaging products held in China annually.

== History ==
The exhibition was initially held in 1994. It has always been one of the most influential packaging exhibitions in China. In 2008, more than 200 internationally reputable exhibitors from 14 countries and regions participated in the show, which occupied an exhibition area of 11,000 square meters and lead to business prospects for more than 13,000 professional visitors from 54 countries and regions.

== Sino-Pack & China Drinktec 2009 ==
The 16th China International Exhibition on Packaging Machinery & Materials (Sino-Pack 2009) along with the 13th China International Exhibition on Beverage, Brewery and Wine Technology (China Drinktec 2009) was held on 3 – 6 March 2009 in Guangzhou, People's Republic of China. It occupied 20,000 sq.m. Exhibition area, and had 500 exhibitors.

The exhibitions were organized by China Foreign Trade Centre (Group), Adsale Exhibition Services Ltd, and the relevant eindustry associations.
