= Shengyou–Guohua Dingzhou Power Plant dispute =

Deadly dispute between Shengyou Village and Guohua Dingzhou Power Plant

Image from Niu's video of the confrontation on 11 June 2005

In 2003–2005, a dispute arose between residents of Shengyou Village in Dingzhou, Baoding, Hebei, China, and Guohua Dingzhou Power Plant, a state-owned project demanding 67 acres of the land.

Two deadly confrontations occurred in 2005 after farmers refused to surrender the property. The dispute was described by The Guardian as "one of the worst incidences of rural unrest in the country in recent years".

== Background ==
Shengyou is a farming village located 70 miles south of Beijing. In 2003, local officials planned to seize 67 acres of the land to build an ash storage facility for Guohua Dingzhou Power Plant. As of 2005, the entire project extended across thirteen villages and two townships. Shengyou was the only village to refuse a deal, with their reasoning being that they were not shown any contracts or official documents.

After officials demanded that the villagers surrender the land, they refused, and beginning on 9 July 2004, the locals camped out on the property and dug foxholes and trenches to prevent the land from being seized.

== First incident ==
At 2:30 a.m. on 20 April 2005, twenty young men attacked residents of the village. One of the men, Zhu Xiaorui, was captured during the incident and held hostage by the villagers until June. Zhu confessed that he was hired in Beijing and paid 100 yuan to "come to the village and beat people up".

== Second incident ==
At 4:30 a.m. on 11 June, three hundred hired thugs ransacked the village, killing six (Note: Some sources claim that seven were killed.) and injuring forty-eight. The young men arrived in five buses and were armed with rifles, shotguns, swords, clubs, and sharpened pipes. The confrontation lasted approximately one hour.

50-year-old farmer Niu Zhanzong videotaped the battle, showing armed attackers shouting "Kill!" and charging the villagers. The video circulated online and was broadcast by media outlets worldwide. Initially, Chinese media spoke little of the incident, with a spokesman for the provincial government telling The Washington Post: "So far, we've been ordered not to issue any information about it."

== Aftermath ==
Following the second attack, there was a large police presence surrounding the village. On 13 June, a journalist was smuggled into Shengyou and was shown a field "littered with abandoned weapons, spent shell casings and bloody rags". Over two hundred suspects were detained in the case, as well as the Dingzhou party chief, He Feng, and one of his subordinates. Farmers continued to control the land and occupied the local Communist Party headquarters, where they placed the bodies of dead villagers and a white flag with the word "injustice" hanging on the entrance.

On 21 July, state media reported that officials had quit their plans to use the land after it was concluded that the villagers did not receive proper compensation. Additionally, each of the deceased victims' families was promised $25,000, which they did not receive as of September 2007. During a protest over the compensation in December 2005, at least three villagers were shot dead by police.

In December 2005, He Feng and twenty-six others went to trial for their roles in the attacks. He Feng, who had ordered them, was fired and charged with "intentionally inflicting injuries upon others", as were all of the other defendants.

In February 2006, He was sentenced to life imprisonment, and four other defendants were sentenced to death.

== See also ==
- Forced evictions in China
