= Zhang Wule =

Chinese politician

Zhang Wule (born 1937) is a People's Republic of China politician. He was born in Anxin County, Hebei. He was governor of Gansu from 1986 to 1993. He was a delegate to the 8th National People's Congress (1993–1998).

Preceded by Yan Haiwang	Governor of Gansu; 1986–1993	Succeeded by Sun Ying
