= Yuan Hanqing =

Chinese scientist

- 袁翰青
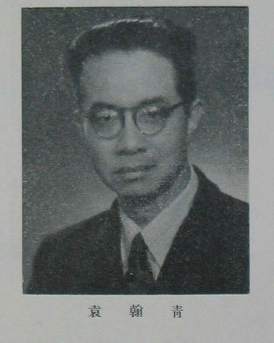
- Born: 7 September 1905; Nantong, Jiangsu, China
- Died: 2 March 1994 (aged 88)

Yuan Hanqing (Chinese: 袁翰青; September 7, 1905 – March 2, 1994) was a Chinese chemist, who was a member of the Chinese Academy of Sciences.
