= Zhang Tianfu =

- Born: 21 September 1910; Shanghai, Jiangsu, China
- Died: 4 June 2017 (aged 106); Fuzhou, Fujian, China
- Education: Fukien Christian University; University of Nanking
- Occupation: agronomist
- Known for: Pioneering modern tea processing, especially oolong tea production

Zhang Tianfu (Chinese: 張天福; pinyin: Zhāng Tiānfú; Wade–Giles: Chang T'ien-fu, 21 September 1910 – 4 June 2017) was a Chinese agronomist and expert in tea processing, known for promoting processing of oolong. He was also a tea connoisseur.

== Biography ==
Zhang was born to a Christian family on 21 September (the 18th day of the 8th lunar month), 1910. Both of his parents were doctors who worked at a mission hospital in Shanghai. In 1911, the family moved to Fuzhou, Fujian. He was sent to a local private primary school at the age of 7, he then attended Ko-Chih High School at the age of 13. Despite his father's objections, Zhang sought to transfer to Shanghai, spending the last year of high school in there. Soon afterwards he was admitted to Fukien Christian University. After completing his first year, he transferred to Faculty of Agriculture, University of Nanking.

Upon graduation Zhang returned to Fukien Christian University as a lecturer. Supported by the university, he surveyed tea cultivation and processing in Japan and then Taiwan under Japanese rule between 1934 and 1935. Later, he established and headed a vocational college of agriculture along with a tea intensive breeding base in Fu'an. In 1936, he introduced the tea processing machines from Japan, facilitating the automation of the domestic tea industry. From 1942 to 1944, he resumed teaching at Fukien Christian University. Then he took over the leadership of the National Tea Research Institute in Chong'an county.

== Personal life ==
In the 1950s, Zhang was transferred to Fuzhou. He was targeted at the start of the Anti-Rightist Movement and subsequently was exiled to Chong'an until 1962. The Cultural Revolution followed, and Zhang was exiled to Shouning. Despite his exile, Zhang continued scientific research. He was rehabilitated in 1980. He finished a monograph on oolong by the 1990s.

Zhang's first wife died in the early 1990s. He married an acrobat, Zhang Xiaohong, in February 2010.
