= Dai Zijin =

Chinese aviator

- Born: 26 March 1916; Shanghai, China
- Died: 18 May 2017 (aged 101); Shanghai, China
- Military career
- Branch: Republic of China Air Force Fourteenth Air Force of USAF
- Service years: 1938 – 51
- Rank: Major
- Units: 2nd PS/1st PG, Chinese-American Composite Wing
- Conflicts: Second Sino-Japanese War

Dai Zijin (Chinese: 戴自瑾; pinyin: Dài Zìjǐn; Wade–Giles: Tai Tzu-Chin; 26 March 1916 – 18 May 2017) was a Chinese aviator who served in World War II. He was one of the last surviving members of the Fourteenth Air Force's Chinese-American Composite Wing. He was referred to as a member of the Flying Tigers, but that was a nickname taken over by the Fourteenth Air Force after the disbanding of the original Flying Tigers of the American Volunteer Group.

Born into an affluent family, Dai spent his early life in Shanghai. He enlisted in the military after the outbreak of the Second Sino-Japanese War. In 1938 he trained as a cadet in Southwest China. After training in the US and India under American instructors from 1942 to 1943, he became a Air Force pilot.

In 1944, Dai and the rest of the crew was tasked with bombing campaign against the Zhengzhou Yellow River Bridge. They managed to do that at minimum altitude. After the end of the war, Dai was transferred to pilot transport planes. Later, he became a special aviator for aircraft carrying senior generals and moved to Taiwan when the Kuomintang lost the Chinese Civil War.

Dai had long been considered a participant of Shi Dianwen's defection to the mainland in 1951. However, according to Lianhe Wanbao, Dai did not defect on his own accord. Instead, he was shot in the chest and left arm by Shi. He became a motorcycle coach at a club in Shanghai from 1956 to 1979.

Dai died on 18 May 2017 in Shanghai, at the age of 101.
