= 1910 in China =

- Decades: 1890s; 1900s; 1910s; 1920s; 1930s
- See also: Other events of 1910; History of China • Timeline • Years

Events in the year 1910 in China.

== Incumbents ==
- Emperor: Xuantong Emperor (1st year)
- Regent: Empress Dowager Longyu

== Events ==
=== February ===
- February 14 — Establishment of the Vicariate Apostolic of Central Chi-Li.

=== April ===
- April 16 — Wang Jingwei and Luo Shixun were arrested separately. They were arrested for conspiracy to assassinate and kill Prince Chun in Beijing.

=== June ===
- June 5 — The Nanyang industrial exposition opens.

=== July ===
- July 7 — Establishment of Chin Woo Athletic Association.
- July 27 — On July 27, Qing Dynasty Government approved the loans from the foreign banks. (Shanghai rubber stock market crisis)

=== October ===
- October 3 — first National Assembly of China convenes, urges Prince Chun to increase constitutional reforms.
- October 18 — At Nanking, Establishment of the Chinese Olympic Committee. (Chinese National Games)

=== November ===
- November 13 — 1910 Penang conference.
- November 29 — The closing of Nanyang industrial exposition.

== Births ==
- January 9 — Zhang Aiping, 6th Minister of National Defense (d. 2003)
- January 28 — Li Kwoh-ting, economist and politician (d. 2001)
- February 1 — Ngapoi Ngawang Jigme, former Vice Chairman of the Chinese People's Political Consultative Conference (d. 2009)
- February 2 — Ji Pengfei, 3rd Minister of Foreign Affairs (d. 2000)
- April 3 — Lai Chuanzhu, general in the People's Liberation Army (d. 1965)
- April 8 — Liu Yalou, general in the People's Liberation Army (d. 1965)
- April 26 — Ruan Lingyu, silent film actress (d. 1935)
- April 27 — Chiang Ching-kuo, politician of the Republic of China (d. 1988)
- April 28 — Deng Hua, general in the People's Liberation Army (d. 1980)
- September 20 — He Zizhen, soldier, revolutionary and politician who was the third wife of Chairman Mao Zedong (d. 1984)
- September 21 – Zhang Tianfu, agronomist and tea expert (d. 2017)
- September 24 — Cao Yu, playwright (d. 1996)
- October 20 — Chen Liting, playwright, drama and film director, screenwriter and film theorist (d. 2013)
- November 2
  - Li Zhaolin, founder and leader of the 3rd Route Army of the Northeast Anti-Japanese United Army (d. 1946)
  - Fei Xiaotong, anthropologist and sociologist (d. 2005)
- November 10 — Zhang Leping, comic artist (d. 1992)
- November 12 — Hua Luogeng, mathematician and politician (d. 1985)
- November 17 — Huang Yongsheng, general in the People's Liberation Army (d. 1983)
- November 21
  - Qian Zhongshu, literary scholar and writer (d. 1998)
  - Long Shujin, major general in the People's Liberation Army and politician (d. 2003)

== Deaths ==
- September 14 — Huo Yuanjia, martial artist and co-founder of the Chin Woo Athletic Association (b. 1868)
- October — Wu Jianren, writer (b. 1866)
