= 1913 in China =

- Decades: 1890s; 1900s; 1910s; 1920s; 1930s
- See also: Other events of 1913; History of China • Timeline • Years

Events in the year 1913 in China.

== Incumbents ==
- President of the Republic of China — Yuan Shikai
- Vice President of the Republic of China — Feng Guozhang, Li Yuanhong
- Premier of the Republic of China —
  - Zhao Bingjun
  - Duan Qirui
  - Xiong Xiling

== Events ==
- Republic of China national football team established
- May 29 — The Republican Party (China) is dissolved
- July 1913 — The Second Revolution was launched when seven southern provinces rebelled against Yuan Shikai
- October 6 — The British Foreign Ministry recognized the Republic of China's Beiyang government and established the Embassy of the Republic of China in the United Kingdom of Great Britain and Ireland in the capital of London (in 1927, the country of change was the United Kingdom of Great Britain and Northern Ireland) and sent a minister.
- October 6–7 — Yuan Shikai surrounded the Parliament with thousands of military and police impersonating ''Citizens League'' and forced him to elect himself as the official president, while Li Yuanhong as the Vice President.
- November — Second Revolution is crushed by Yuan's government and KMT members go into exile abroad

== Births ==
- January 1 — Shih Kien, Hong Kong actor and martial artist (d. 2009)
- January 3 — Lee Tit, film director (d. 1996)
- January 25 — Huang Hua, 5th Minister of Foreign Affairs (d. 2010)
- January 30 — Han Xianchu, general in the People's Liberation Army (d. 1986)
- February 2 — Hong Xuezhi, politician and general in the People's Liberation Army (d. 2006)
- February 4 — Yam Kim-fai, Cantonese opera actress (d. 1989)
- February 5 — Wu De, Communist revolutionary and politician (d. 1995)
- March 15 — Ching Miao, Taiwanese actor (d. 1989)
- March 28 — Qiao Guanhua, 4th Minister of Foreign Affairs (d. 1983)
- April 13 — Li Guohao, structural engineer and bridge engineering expert (d. 2005)
- May 13 — Bai Fangli, Pedicab driver and philanthropist (d. 2005)
- August 24 — Lan Jen Chu, Chinese-born American electrical engineer (d. 1973)
- September 2 — Wei Guoqing, government official, military officer and political commissar of Zhuang ethnicity (d. 1989)
- September 7 — Nie Fengzhi, general in the People's Liberation Army Air Force (d. 1992)
- October 15 — Xi Zhongxun, Communist revolutionary and politician (d. 2002)
- October 16
  - Qian Sanqiang, nuclear physicist (d. 1992)
  - Shen Chang-huan, Taiwanese politician and diplomat (d. 1998)
- October 28 — Yang Yong, general in the People's Liberation Army (d. 1983)
- November 7 — Ding Sheng, general and politician (d. 1999)
- November 10 — Sun Yun-suan, Taiwanese engineer and politician (d. 2006)
- November 21 — Zhang Lixiong, politician, military officer and supercentenarian (d. 2024)
- December 28 — Wang Luobin, songwriter (d. 1996)

=== Dates unknown ===
- Jin Yunying, Manchu princess (d. 1992)
- Ly Singko, Singaporean writer and journalist (d. 1996)
- Wang Mintong, Manchu noblewoman (d. 2003)

== Deaths ==
- February 22 — Empress Dowager Longyu, last Empress dowager of the Qing dynasty and regent to Emperor Xuantong, the last Emperor of China (b. 1868)
- March 22 — Song Jiaoren, republican revolutionary, political leader and founder of the Kuomintang (b. 1882)
- June 9 — Shen Jiaben, Late Qing politician and jurist (b. 1840)
