= Shen Panwen =

Chinese chemist (1916–2017)

- 申泮文
- Born: 7 September 1916; Jilin City, Jilin, China
- Died: 4 July 2017 (aged 100); Tianjin, China
- Education: Nankai High School
- Alma mater: Nankai University; National Southwestern Associated University
- Scientific career
- Fields: Inorganic chemistry
- Institutions: Chinese Academy of Sciences (CAS)

Shen Panwen (Chinese: 申泮文; pinyin: Shēn Pànwén; 7 September 1916 – 4 July 2017) was a Chinese chemist.

Shen was born in September 1916 in Jilin City, Jilin, with his ancestral home in Conghua, Guangzhou and studied chemistry at National Southwestern Associated University.

He taught at Nanjing University and was named an academician of the Chinese Academy of Sciences in 1980.

== Death ==
Shen died at the age of 100 on 4 July 2017.
