= Huang Feili =

- 黄飞立
- Born: 17 June 1917; Guangzhou, Guangdong, China
- Died: 20 February 2017 (aged 99); Beijing, China
- Occupation(s): Conductor and Professor

Huang Feili (simplified Chinese: 黄飞立; traditional Chinese: 黃飛立; pinyin: Huáng Fēilì; Wade–Giles: Huang Fei-li) was a Chinese conductor and musical educator. He was the founder of the first conducting department in China.

Huang was born into a family of intellectuals with faith in Christianity and attended Pui Ching primary school before moving to Shanghai when he was 10. His initial thought was to be a physician, so he applied for admission to Department of Biology, University of Shanghai as pre-medical education.

Huang graduated in 1941, but fled to Fujian during the Japanese invasion of China, working as a violin teacher at National Fukien Conservatory of Music from 1943 until 1945. Meanwhile, he taught himself to play the piano and translated foreign textbooks.

Huang enrolled at Yale University for further musical education in 1948. Studying under Paul Hindemith, he played the violin well enough to join the New Haven Symphony.

Huang returned to China in 1951 and taught at the Central Conservatory of Music, and subsequently directed the newly established Conducting Department beginning in 1956. He became a respected teacher at the CCM and one of the most prominent conductors in China. In the mid-1980s, he was invited to direct a student ensemble that later became one of the finest professional orchestras in mainland China: the Beijing Symphony.

After Huang retired at age 70, he still kept enthusiasm for music and trained several orchestras with young ensembles.

Huang's wife, Zhao Fangxing (simplified Chinese: 赵方幸; traditional Chinese: 趙方幸), was his student; they met in Fujian and married in 1946. Zhao was also a musician; she predeceased him in 2012.
