= 1919 in China =

- Decades: 1890s; 1900s; 1910s; 1920s; 1930s
- See also: Other events of 1919; History of China • Timeline • Years

Events in the year 1919 in China.

== Incumbents ==
- President of the Republic of China — Xu Shichang
- Warlord Era

== Events ==
=== May ===
- May 4 — May Fourth Movement, student protests over government's failure in Paris Peace Conference.

=== August ===
- August 9 — Jin Yunpeng served as the Premier of the Republic of China.

=== October ===
- October 10 — The Chinese Revolutionary Party resurrected to the Kuomintang of China (中國國民黨).

== Births ==
- May 12 — Wu Wenjun, mathematician, historian and writer (d. 2017)
- August 8 — Hau Pei-tsun, Taiwanese general and politician (d. 2020)
- August 11 — Jiang Ying, opera singer and music teacher (d. 2012)
- August 29 — Wu Guanzhong, painter (d. 2010)
- September 12 — Yang Yi, translator (d. 2023)
- October 5 — Yan Huizhu, opera singer (d. 1966)
- October 17 — Zhao Ziyang, 3rd Premier of China (d. 2005)

== Deaths ==
- April 24 — Zhan Tianyou, railroad engineer (b. 1861)
- November 20 — Liu Shipei, philologist, anarchist and revolutionary activist (b. 1884)
- December 28 — Feng Guozhang, general and politician (b. 1859)
