= 1918 in China =

- Decades: 1890s; 1900s; 1910s; 1920s; 1930s
- See also: Other events of 1918; History of China • Timeline • Years

Events in the year 1918 in China.

== Incumbents ==
- President of the Republic of China — Feng Guozhang until 10 October, Xu Shichang
- Warlord Era

== Events ==
=== January ===
- January 17 — USS Monocacy incident was an attack on the American gunboat Monocacy in January 1918 by Chinese soldiers along the Yangtze River. It was one of many incidents at the time involving armed Chinese firing on foreign vessels.

=== February ===
- February 13 — 1918 Shantou earthquake occurred in Shantou, Kwangtung, Republic of China. It also caused some damage in what was then British Hong Kong.

=== March ===
- March 8 — Wang Yitang and Xu Shuzheng established the Anfu Club.
- March 23 — Duan Qirui resigns as Premier of the Republic of China.

=== August ===
- August 12 — Wang Yitang elect Xu Shichang to the presidency in the 1918 presidential election. (1918 Republic of China National Assembly election)

=== October ===
- October 10 — Duan Qirui left as Premier of the Republic of China.

== Births ==
=== January ===
- January 11 — Hu Sheng, Marxist theorist and historian (d. 2000)

=== February ===
- February 18 — Lim Goh Tong, prominent wealthy Malaysian Chinese businessman and entrepreneur (d. 2007)

=== March ===
- March 18
  - Nan Huai-Chin, Buddhist monk, religious scholar and writer (d. 2012)
  - Lin Haiyin, Taiwanese writer and editor (d. 2001)

=== April ===
- April 9 — Zhang Tingfa, 4th Commander of the People's Liberation Army Air Force (d. 2010)
- April 18 — Jusup Mamay, Kyrgyz artist and narrator of Epic of Manas (d. 2014)

=== May ===
- May 1 — Li Yaowen, admiral in the People's Liberation Army (d. 2018)

=== June ===
- June 15 — Zhang Ruifang, film and theatre actress (d. 2012)
- June 25 — Ray Huang, Chinese American historian and philosopher (d. 2000)

=== August ===
- August 3 — Cheng Kaijia, nuclear engineer and nuclear physicist (d. 2018)

=== September ===
- September 14 — Jin Moyu, educator and last surviving Manchu princess (d. 2014)

=== November ===
- November 5 — Su Yiran, revolutionary and politician (d. 2021)
- November 30 — Lan Yinong, politician (d. 2008)

=== December ===
- You Taizhong, 5th Secretary of the Inner Mongolia Autonomous Regional Committee of the Chinese Communist Party (d. 1998)

=== Dates unknown ===
- Zhou Hui, 6th Secretary of the Inner Mongolia Autonomous Regional Committee of the Chinese Communist Party (d. 2004)

== Deaths ==
- February 26 — Cheng Biguang, admiral who served in the Beiyang Fleet and the Republic of China Navy (b. 1861)
- March 2 — Xiliang, 2nd Viceroy of the Three Northeast Provinces (b. 1853)
- April 25 — Qu Hongji, politician of the Qing dynasty (b. 1850)
- May 2 — Su Manshu, writer, poet, painter, revolutionist and translator (b. 1884)
- May 3 — Charlie Soong, businessman (b. 1863)
- June 14 — Lu Jianzhang, general of the late Qing dynasty and the early period of the Republic of China (b. 1862)
- September 1 — Tang Hualong, politician of the Republic of China (b. 1874)
- November 24 — Ma Anliang, Chinese Muslim general during the Qing dynasty and the early period of the Republic of China (b. 1855)
- November 29 — Ren Fuchen, Chinese member of the Bolshevik Party and a commander of a Chinese regiment of the Soviet Red Army (b. 1884)
