= Zhang Guoguang =

Chinese politician

Zhang Guoguang (born April 1945) was the former governor of Liaoning Province, serving in 1998–2001, as well as the former governor of Hubei Province, serving in 2001–2002. He was born in Suizhong in 1945.

Political offices
Preceded by Wen Shizhen	Governor of Liaoning; 1998–2001	Succeeded by Bo Xilai
