= Wan Xueyuan =

Chinese politician

Wan Xueyuan (Chinese: 万学远; born January 1941) is a politician of the People's Republic of China. He currently serves as the vice director of foreign affairs committee of 11th Chinese People's Political Consultative Conference (CPPCC).

Born in Huanggang, Hubei Province, Wan joined the Chinese Communist Party in June, 1961. He graduated from the department of naval dynamics of Shanghai Jiao Tong University in 1964.

Wan served as the secretary-general of the government of Shanghai. In September 1992, Wan became the vice governor of Zhejiang. From January, 1993 to April, 1997, he served as the Governor of Zhejiang. Between 1997 and 2006, he served as Vice-Minister of Human Resources and Social Security.

Political offices
Preceded by Ge Hongsheng	Governor of Zhejiang; 1991–1997	Succeeded by Chai Songyue
