= 1917 in China =

- Decades: 1890s; 1900s; 1910s; 1920s; 1930s
- See also: Other events of 1917; History of China • Timeline • Years

Events in the year 1917 in China.

== Incumbents ==
- President: Li Yuanhong
- Vice President:
  - Feng Guozhang (June 7, 1916 – July 1)
  - position abolished on July 1st
- Premier: Duan Qirui

== Events ==
- Warlord Era
  - July 1–12 — Manchu Restoration: An attempt by monarchist general Zhang Xun to restore the Qing Dynasty

== Births ==
=== January ===
- January 1 — Cheng Gwan-min, Hong Kong TVB actor (d. 1994)
- January 3 — Liu Zhonghua, military officer in the People's Liberation Army (d. 2018)
- January 6 — Koo Chen-fu, Taiwanese businessman, diplomat and film producer (d. 2005)

=== February ===
- February 1 — Zhang Chunqiao, political theorist, writer and politician (d. 2005)
- February 9 — Sanggyai Yexe, 1st Chairman of Tibet Autonomous Region (d. 2008)

=== March ===
- March 10 — Ling Zifeng, film director (d. 1999)
- March 31 — Liu Fuzhi, politician (d. 2013)

=== April ===
- April 13 — Shen Shanjiong, microbiologist and geneticist (d. 2021)
- April 14 — Li Rui, politician, historian and dissident (d. 2019)
- April 24 — Song Ping, Communist revolutionary and high-ranking politician (d. 2026)
- April 26 — Ieoh Ming Pei, main architect of the Louvre Pyramid (d. 2019)

=== June ===
- June 17 — Huang Feili, conductor and musical educator (d. 2017)
- June 18 — Tang Ti-sheng, Cantonese opera playwright, screenwriter and film director (d. 1959)
- June 29 — Ling Yun, politician (d. 2018)

=== July ===
- July 6 — Wang Da-hong, Taiwanese architect (d. 2018)

=== August ===
- August 9 — Jao Tsung-I, Hong Kong sinologist, calligrapher, historian and painter (d. 2018)

=== September ===
- September 6 — Yao Yilin, former Vice Premier of China (d. 1994)
- September 10 — Ren Rong, general and politician (d. 2017)
- September 24 — Lee Huan, Taiwanese politician (d. 2010)

=== November ===
- November 3 — Chung Sze-yuen, Hong Kong politician and businessman (d. 2018)
- November 28 — Xiang Shouzhi, general and revolutionist (d. 2017)
- November 29 — Hou Baolin, xiangsheng performer (d. 1993)

=== December ===
- December 2 — Ye Qun, military officer and politician (d. 1971)
- December 20 — Li Pei, linguist and professor of English (d. 2017)

== Deaths ==
- January 9 — Liu Yongfu, commander of the Black Flag Army (b. 1837)
- January 28 — Yikuang, Manchu noble and politician of the Qing Dynasty (b. 1838)
- February 3 — Liang Cheng, former ambassador to the United States during the Qing dynasty (b. 1864)
