= Song Baorui =

Chinese politician (1937–2022)

- 宋宝瑞

Governor of Sichuan
- In office February 1996 – June 1999
- Preceded by: Xiao Yang
- Succeeded by: Zhang Zhongwei

Personal details
- Born: December 1937 Shunyi County, Beijing, China
- Died: 20 September 2022 (aged 84) Chengdu, Sichuan, China
- Party: Chinese Communist Party
- Education: Tsinghua University

Chinese name
- Simplified Chinese: 宋宝瑞
- Traditional Chinese: 宋寶瑞
Transcriptions
Standard Mandarin
- Hanyu Pinyin: Sòng Bǎoruì

Song Baorui (Chinese: 宋宝瑞; December 1937 – 20 September 2022) was a politician of the People's Republic of China. He served as Governor of Sichuan from 1996 to 1999.

== Biography ==
Song Baorui was a native of Shunyi County (now Shunyi District), Beijing. He was born in December 1937 and joined the Chinese Communist Party in December 1958. From 1957 to 1963 he studied metallurgy at Tsinghua University in Beijing, and completed a graduate program at the metallurgy department of Tsinghua in 1966.

From 1968 to 1975 Song worked as a technician at the Dongfang Boiler Factory and China Welding Material Company in Zigong, Sichuan province, rising through the ranks to become Chief Engineer in 1975 and General Manager in 1982.

From 1983 to 1986 Song Baorui was the Deputy Communist Party Chief and then Communist Party Chief of Zigong City. He was transferred to the Sichuan provincial government in 1986 and became Deputy Party Chief of Sichuan in 1989, concurrently serving as Party Chief of provincial capital Chengdu from 1992 to 1993. In 1996 he was promoted to Governor of Sichuan province. As governor he actively promoted Sichuan's opening up.

Song was an alternate member of the 14th Central Committee of the Chinese Communist Party, and a full member of the 15th Central Committee.

Political offices
Preceded by Xiao Yang	Governor of Sichuan; 1996–1999	Succeeded by Zhang Zhongwei
