= Sun Ying =

Chinese politician (1936–2025)

Sun Ying (November 1936 – 6 July 2025) was a Chinese politician. He was born in Baodi District, Tianjin. Sun graduated from Shanxi Normal University in 1958. He was Chinese Communist Party Committee Secretary of Taiyuan, Shanxi from 1987 to 1992. Sun was governor (1996–1998) and Communist Party Committee Secretary (1998–2001) of Gansu. He died in Beijing on 6 July 2025, at the age of 88.

Preceded by Wang Maolin	Party Secretary of Taiyuan; 1987–1992	Succeeded by
Preceded by Zhang Wule	Governor of Gansu; 1996–1998	Succeeded by Song Zhaosu
Preceded by Yan Haiwang	Party Secretary of Gansu; 1998–2001	Succeeded by Song Zhaosu
