= 1915 in China =

- Decades: 1890s; 1900s; 1910s; 1920s; 1930s
- See also: Other events of 1915; History of China • Timeline • Years

Events in the year 1915 in China.

== Incumbents ==
- President: Yuan Shikai
- Vice President: Feng Guozhang
- Premier: Xu Shichang (until December 22), Lu Zhengxiang (starting December 22)

== Events ==
- January 8 — Imperial Japanese government issues the Twenty-One Demands to the Chinese
- May 15–21 – The Far Eastern Championship Games take place in Shanghai.
- May 25
  - Treaty of Kyakhta (1915)
  - the Yuan government accepts four out of the five set of demands issued in the Twenty-One Demands
- December 12 — Empire of China (1915–1916)
- December 25 — beginning of the National Protection War

== Births ==
- Nien Cheng or Zheng Nian (January 28, 1915 – November 2, 2009) is the pen name of Yao Nien-Yuan[1] (Chinese: 姚念媛; pinyin: Yáo Niànyuán). She was a Chinese author who recounted her harrowing experiences during the Cultural Revolution in her memoir Life and Death in Shanghai.
- Peter Zhang Bairen (February 14, 1915 – October 12, 2005) was the unofficial Bishop of Hanyang, China
- Yang Huimin (simplified Chinese: 杨惠敏; traditional Chinese: 楊惠敏; pinyin: Yáng Huìmǐn; March 6, 1915 - March 9, 1992) was a Girl Guide during the 1937 Battle of Shanghai who supplied a Republic of China flag and brought supplies to besieged defenders of the Sihang Warehouse
- Wang Daohan (Chinese: 汪道涵; pinyin: Wāng Dàohán), (27 March 1915 – 24 December 2005) was the former president of the Association for Relations Across the Taiwan Straits (ARATS)
- Sylvia Wu (24 October 1915 – 29 September 2022) was a Chinese-born American restaurateur
- Jiao Ruoyu (7 November 1915 – 1 January 2020) was a Chinese Communist Party politician and diplomat who was Mayor of Beijing
- Hu Yaobang (20 November 1915 – 15 April 1989) was a high-ranking official of the People's Republic of China
- Ren Xinmin (5 December 1915 – 12 February 2017) was a Chinese aerospace engineer
- Ke Hua (19 December 1915 – 1 January 2019) was a Chinese diplomat
- Wu Teh Yao (1915–17 April 1994) was an educator and a specialist in Confucianism and political science

=== Other countries ===
- Israel Epstein (20 April 1915 – 26 May 2005) was a naturalized Chinese journalist and author. He was one of the few foreign-born Chinese citizens of non-Chinese origin to become a member of the Chinese Communist Party
- Sidney Shapiro (Chinese: 沙博理; pinyin: Shā Bólǐ) (December 23, 1915 – October 18, 2014) was an American-born Chinese translator, actor and author who lived in China from 1947 to 2014. He was one of very few naturalized citizens of the PRC
