= Vice President of China =

Largely ceremonial office in China

Vice President of the People's Republic of China
- 中华人民共和国副主席
- National Emblem of China

- Flag of China

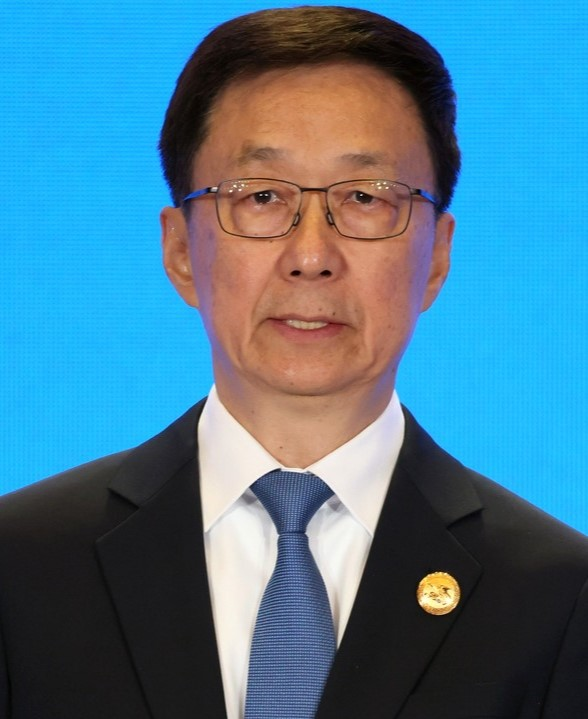
- Incumbent; Han Zheng since 10 March 2023
- Style: Mr. Vice President (副主席) (informal); His Excellency (阁下) (diplomatic)
- Type: Deputy state representative
- Status: Deputy national-level official
- Residence: Zhongnanhai
- Seat: Zhongnanhai West Building, Beijing
- Nominator: Presidium of the National People's Congress
- Appointer: National People's Congress
- Term length: Five years, renewable
- Constituting instrument: Constitution of China
- Inaugural holder: Li Yuanhong (Republican era); Zhu De (current form)
- Formation: 1 January 1912; 114 years ago (Republican era); 27 September 1954; 71 years ago (current form)
- Abolished: Between 1975 and 1982
- Unofficial names: State Vice Chairman

Vice President of China
- Simplified Chinese: 中华人民共和国副主席
Transcriptions
Standard Mandarin
- Hanyu Pinyin: Zhōnghuá Rénmín Gònghéguó Fùzhǔxí

Alternative Chinese name
- Simplified Chinese: 国家副主席
Transcriptions
Standard Mandarin
- Hanyu Pinyin: Guójiā Fùzhǔxí

The vice president of the People's Republic of China is the deputy to the president of the People's Republic of China, the state representative of China. Similar to the Chinese president, the vice president is a ceremonial office and has no real power in China's political system. (Note: According to the Constitution, most of the presidential powers require the approval or confirmation of the National People's Congress. Constitution of the People's Republic of China, Article 80. (The president of the People's Republic of China, pursuant to decisions of the National People's Congress and the National People's Congress Standing Committee...).) The premier is the second-highest ranking official in China.

The office originated in the Republican era when Li Yuanhong became the provisional vice president of China after the founding of the Republic following the 1911 Revolution. It was abolished in 1917, but restored in 1947, with the adoption of the Constitution of the Republic of China. The ROC post has continued to exist in Taiwan following the government's retreat to the island. The vice presidency in the People's Republic of China was first established with the adoption of the Constitution in 1954 by the National People's Congress (NPC), with the official English-language translation of "state vice chairman". The post of vice chairman was abolished under the Constitution of 1975 together with the chairman, then reinstated in the Constitution of 1982. Since 1982, the title's official English-language translation has been "vice president", although the Chinese title remains unchanged. The new constitution stipulated that the vice president could not serve more than two consecutive terms; the term limits were removed in 2018.

Under the current constitution, the vice president is elected by the National People's Congress, the country's supreme organ of state power, and serves at its pleasure. According to the constitution, the principal duty of the vice president is assisting the president in their duties. The vice president may exercise part of the functions and powers of the president on the president's behalf when so entrusted by the president. The vice president assumes the presidency in case the office becomes vacant until a new president is elected by the NPC. The importance of the vice presidency has varied with the officeholders; some vice presidents have been members of the Chinese Communist Party (CCP)'s Politburo or Politburo Standing Committee. The vice president has also generally assumed a more major role in China's foreign relations, and has usually served as a member of CCP's Central Foreign Affairs Commission and Central Leading Group on Hong Kong and Macau Affairs. The incumbent vice president of China is Han Zheng, who took office in 10 March 2023.

== History ==
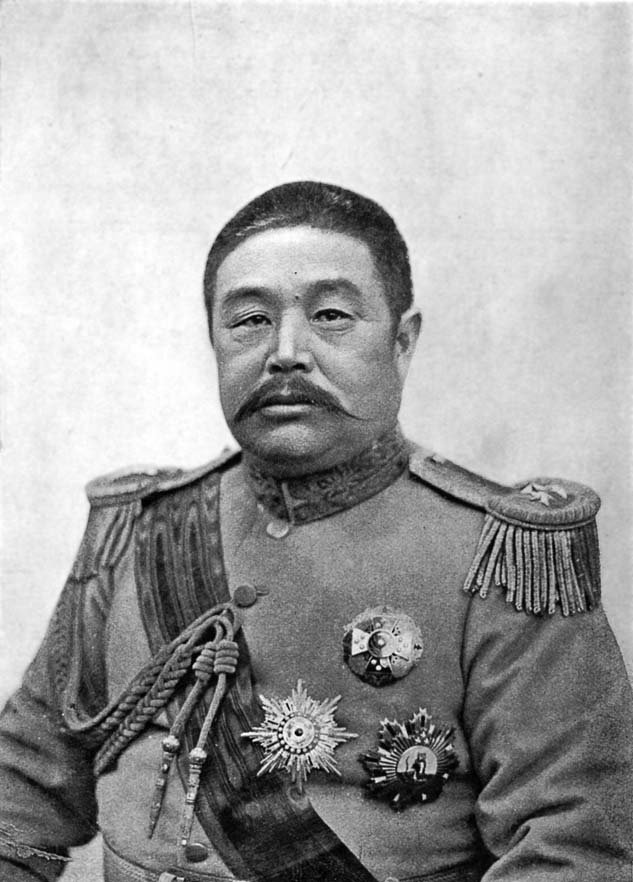
Li Yuanhong, the first vice president in Chinese history.

The office was first established under the Beiyang government when Li Yuanhong became the first vice president of the country when the Republic was founded in 1912. The post was abolished in 1917, but it was restored after the end of the Nationalist government as Li Zongren became the first modern vice president under the 1947 Constitution of the Republic of China. The office of the vice president along with the government of the Republic of China, was relocated to Taiwan in 1949, where it exists today.

The PRC post, which began as the state vice chairman was first established under the 1954 Constitution, together with the chairman. It was, along with the state chairman, abolished in the new Constitution adopted by the 4th National People's Congress (NPC) in 1975. The office, now called the vice president, was restored in the 1982 constitution together with the presidency. The new constitution mandated term limits for the office, stipulating the president and vice president could not serve more than two consecutive terms. On March 11, 2018, the first session of the 13th National People's Congress, by a vote of 2,958 in favor, two opposed and three abstaining, passed a constitutional amendment that removed the previous term limits for the president and the vice president.

== Selection ==
=== Eligibility ===
Article 79 of the Constitution sets three qualifications for being elected for the vice presidency. To serve as president, one must:

- be a Chinese citizen;
- have the right to vote and stand for election;
- be at least 45 years old.

=== Election ===
According to the Organic Law of the National People's Congress (NPC), constitutionally China's supreme organ of state power, the vice president is nominated by the NPC Presidium, the Congress's executive organ. However, the nomination is effectively made by the Chinese Communist Party, with the decisions being made among Party leaders. Candidates for top positions including the vice president are first approved first by the CCP's Politburo Standing Committee, and then by its Politburo, then approved in a special plenary session the Central Committee just before the NPC session for election by the Congress, with the Presidium presenting the nominee during the NPC session. Although the Presidium could theoretically nominate multiple candidates for the presidency, leading the election to be competitive, it has always nominated a single candidate for the office.

After the nomination, the vice president is elected by the NPC, which also has the power to remove the vice president and other state officers from office. Elections and removals are decided by majority vote. The length of the vice president's term of office is the same as the NPC, which is 5 years. Since 2018, the vice president is required to recite the constitutional oath of office before assuming office.

== Powers ==
The vice president's duties constitutionally include assisting the president. The vice president may exercise part of the functions and powers of the president on the president's behalf when so entrusted by the president. The vice president also becomes the president in case the office becomes vacant until a new president is elected by the NPC. In case the vice presidency becomes vacant, the NPC elects a new vice president.

In practice, the position of the vice president is mostly ceremonial; Vice presidents Hu Jintao, Zeng Qinghong and Xi Jinping have been members of the Politburo Standing Committee of the Chinese Communist Party (CCP) and the Central Secretariat, the country's main decision making bodies; these three served concurrently as the first-ranking member of the CCP Secretariat, in charge of party affairs. Since 2018, the vice presidency has been held by a former member of the Politburo Standing Committee.

The vice president may play a major role in foreign affairs. For instance, the vice president generally sits on the Central Foreign Affairs Commission, a policy coordination body of the CCP. The vice president has also typically sits on the Central Leading Group on Hong Kong and Macau Affairs. Therefore, while the vice president may not actually have substantive powers as defined in the Constitution, the office nonetheless carries significance and prestige. The holders of the office have all been individuals with a degree of political clout.

== List of vice presidents ==
Generations of leadership

First Administration Second Administration Third Administration Hu–Wen Administration Xi–Li Administration/General secretaryship of Xi Jinping

=== Central People's Government (1949–1954) ===
Vice Chairmen of the Central People's Government
(co-serving, 1 October 1949 – 27 September 1954)

1. Zhu De
2. Liu Shaoqi
3. Song Qingling
4. Li Jishen
5. Zhang Lan
6. Gao Gang (until his suicide on 17 August 1954)

=== The 1st Constitution (1954–1975) ===
Vice Chairmen of the People's Republic of China
| Portrait | Name (Birth–Death) Constituency | | Term of office | | NPC | Chairman |
|---|---|---|---|---|---|---|
| 1 | Zhu De 朱德 (1886–1976); Sichuan at-large | | 27 September 1954 | 27 April 1959 | I | Mao Zedong |
| 1 | Zhu De 朱德 (1886–1976); Sichuan at-large | | The first vice chairman of the People's Republic of China. | | | |
| 2 | Song Qingling 宋庆龄 (1893–1981); Shanghai at-large | Dong Biwu 董必武 (1886–1975); Hubei at-large | 27 April 1959 | 17 January 1975 | II · III | Liu Shaoqi |
| 2 | Song Qingling 宋庆龄 (1893–1981); Shanghai at-large | Dong Biwu 董必武 (1886–1975); Hubei at-large | Served jointly as Vice Chairmen. | | | |
Vacancy by ascension and post abolished

=== The 4th Constitution (1982–present) ===
Vice President of the People's Republic of China
| Portrait | Name (Birth–Death) Constituency | Term of office | | NPC | President |
|---|---|---|---|---|---|
| 3 | Ulanhu 乌兰夫 (1906–1988); Inner Mongolia at-large | 18 June 1983 | 8 April 1988 | VI | Li Xiannian |
| 3 | Ulanhu 乌兰夫 (1906–1988); Inner Mongolia at-large | An ethnic Mongol and former Chairman of Inner Mongolia, Ulanhu served as the first vice president under the 4th Constitution of the People's Republic of China. | | | |
| 4 | Wang Zhen 王震 (1908–1993); Xinjiang at-large | 8 April 1988 | 12 March 1993 | VII | Yang Shangkun |
| 4 | Wang Zhen 王震 (1908–1993); Xinjiang at-large | Wang Zhen, a Communist military leader, was perhaps best known for leading the People's Liberation Army into Xinjiang at the foundation of the People's Republic. In 1988 Wang assumed the title of vice-president in an honorary capacity, after his failed effort to put the conservative Deng Liqun in the position of General Secretary. Wang was the second vice president under the 4th Constitution of the People's Republic of China. He died in office. | | | |
| 5 | Rong Yiren 荣毅仁 (1916–2005); Shanghai at-large | 12 March 1993 | 15 March 1998 | VIII | Jiang Zemin |
| 5 | Rong Yiren 荣毅仁 (1916–2005); Shanghai at-large | A member of the China National Democratic Construction Association, a recognized non-Communist political party in China, Rong served as the third vice president under the 4th Constitution of the People's Republic of China. | | | |
| 6 | Hu Jintao 胡锦涛 (born 1942); Guizhou at-large | 15 March 1998 | 15 March 2003 | IX | Jiang Zemin |
| 6 | Hu Jintao 胡锦涛 (born 1942); Guizhou at-large | Hu, the former party chief of Guizhou province and the Tibet Autonomous Region, served as the fourth vice president under the 4th Constitution of the People's Republic of China. In his capacity as vice-president, Hu was probably best known for handling the aftermath of the United States bombing of the Chinese embassy in Belgrade. Hu was the first member of the Politburo Standing Committee to assume the post since the adoption of the 1982 constitution. In 2003, Hu became the first vice president to become president. | | | |
| 7 | Zeng Qinghong 曾庆红 (born 1939); Jiangxi at-large | 15 March 2003 | 15 March 2008 | X | Hu Jintao |
| 7 | Zeng Qinghong 曾庆红 (born 1939); Jiangxi at-large | Zeng Qinghong, who had come to prominence as a political aide to Jiang Zemin, served as the fifth vice president under the 4th Constitution of the People's Republic of China. Also a member of the Politburo Standing Committee, Zeng received an unusually high number of votes against him during his election for the vice-presidency. | | | |
| 8 | Xi Jinping 习近平 (born 1953); Shanghai at-large | 15 March 2008 | 14 March 2013 | XI | Hu Jintao |
| 8 | Xi Jinping 习近平 (born 1953); Shanghai at-large | Xi, the former party chief of Zhejiang, then Shanghai, became the sixth vice president under the 4th Constitution of the People's Republic of China and the second vice president to become president. Also a member of the Politburo Standing Committee. | | | |
| 9 | Li Yuanchao 李源潮 (born 1950); Jiangsu at-large | 14 March 2013 | 17 March 2018 | XII | Xi Jinping |
| 9 | Li Yuanchao 李源潮 (born 1950); Jiangsu at-large | Li, the former party chief of Jiangsu, became the seventh vice president under the 4th Constitution of the People's Republic of China. A member of the Politburo. In his capacity as vice-president, Li represented China at numerous international events of symbolic significance, such as the State Memorial Service of Nelson Mandela, and the state funeral of Lee Kuan Yew. | | | |
| 10 | Wang Qishan 王岐山 (born 1948); Hunan at-large | 17 March 2018 | 10 March 2023 | XIII | Xi Jinping |
| 10 | Wang Qishan 王岐山 (born 1948); Hunan at-large | Wang, a retired member of the Politburo Standing Committee and the former secretary of the Central Commission for Discipline Inspection – China's top anti-corruption enforcer, was selected for the vice president post ostensibly for his experience in foreign affairs. Wang's assuming the post again made the vice-presidency a highly relevant office. | | | |
| 11 | Han Zheng 韩正 (born 1955); Shanghai at-large | 10 March 2023 | Incumbent | XIV | Xi Jinping |
| 11 | Han Zheng 韩正 (born 1955); Shanghai at-large | Han, a retired member of the Politburo Standing Committee and the former first-ranked Vice-Premier of the State Council, was selected for the vice president post. | | | |

== See also ==
- Order of precedence in China
- List of current vice presidents and designated acting presidents
