= 1991 in China =

- Decades: 1970s; 1980s; 1990s; 2000s; 2010s
- See also: Other events of 1991; History of China • Timeline • Years

The following lists events in the year 1991 in China.

== Incumbents ==
- General Secretary of the Communist Party: Jiang Zemin
- President: Yang Shangkun
- Premier: Li Peng
- Vice President: Wang Zhen
- Vice Premier: Yao Yilin

=== Governors ===
- Governor of Anhui Province – Fu Xishou
- Governor of Fujian Province – Jia Qinglin
- Governor of Gansu Province – Jia Zhijie
- Governor of Guangdong Province – Ye Xuanping then Zhu Senlin
- Governor of Guizhou Province – Wang Zhaowen
- Governor of Hainan Province – Liu Jianfeng
- Governor of Hebei Province – Cheng Weigao
- Governor of Heilongjiang Province – Shao Qihui
- Governor of Henan Province – Li Changchun
- Governor of Hubei Province – Guo Shuyan
- Governor of Hunan Province – Chen Bangzhu
- Governor of Jiangsu Province – Chen Huanyou
- Governor of Jiangxi Province – Wu Guanzheng
- Governor of Jilin Province – Wang Zhongyu then Gao Yan
- Governor of Liaoning Province – Yue Qifeng
- Governor of Qinghai Province – Jin Jipeng then Tian Chengping
- Governor of Shaanxi Province – Bai Qingcai
- Governor of Shandong Province – Zhao Zhihao
- Governor of Shanxi Province – Wang Senhao then Hu Fuguo
- Governor of Sichuan Province – Zhang Haoruo
- Governor of Yunnan Province – Li Jiating
- Governor of Zhejiang Province – Ge Hongsheng (until March), Wan Xueyuan (starting March)

== Events ==
- 1991 Sino-Soviet Border Agreement
- Eastern China flood of 1991
- September 24 – According to Shanxi Province government official confirmed reported, a human stampede occur ongoing to Lantern festival, Yingze Park, Yingze District, Taiyuan, Shanxi, as resulting to 105 persons were crushing to death, 108 persons were hurt.
- December 26 – The Soviet Union is dissolved into 15 independent states leaving China as the world's last major communist state.

== Culture ==
- List of Chinese films of 1991

== Births ==
- July 20 – Merxat, actor
- August 16 – G.E.M., singer
- October 7 – Lay Zhang, entertainer (Exo)

== Deaths ==
- January 4 — Sanmao, Taiwanese writer and translator (b. 1943)
- January 27 — Zheng Dongguo, Nationalist general (b. 1903)
- February 18
  - Liu Chi-Sheng, pilot who fought in WWII, the Second Sino-Japanese War and the Chinese Civil War (b. 1914)
  - Zhang Wenjin, diplomat (b. 1914)
- March 30 — Cheng Zihua, politician and military general (b. 1905)
- April 2 — Cheng Shewo, journalist, publisher and educator (b. 1898)
- April 10 — Wu Yin, film and drama actress (b. 1909)
- April 16 — Qin Benli, journalist, newspaper editor and commentator (b. 1918)
- May 4 — Sun Xiaocun, politician (b. 1906)
- May 14 — Jiang Qing, fourth wife of Mao Zedong and one of the members of the Gang of Four (b. 1914)
- May 18 — Hoàng Văn Hoan, Pro-Chinese Vietnamese Politician (b. 1905)
- July 27 — Xu Shijie, politician (b. 1920)
- July 28 — Wang Ming-Dao, Protestant pastor (b. 1900)
- August 7 — Bai Xiangguo, military officer and general (b. 1918)
- August 12 — Lin Fengmian, painter (b. 1900)
- September 14 — Liu Dagang, chemist (b. 1904)
- September 17 — Song Shilun, general (b. 1907)
- September 23 — Yue-Kong Pao, Hong Kong businessman (b. 1918)
- October 10 — Chen Xuezhao, writer and journalist (b. 1906)
- October 15 — Han Ying-chieh, Hong Kong actor (b. 1927)
- October 16 — Barry Wong, Hong Kong screenwriter, film producer and actor (b. 1946)
- November 14 — Zeng Xueming, wife of Ho Chi Minh (b. 1905)
- November 19
  - Xian Henghan, lieutenant general (b. 1911)
  - Hu Zi'ang, politician (b. 1897)
- November 28 — Lu Gwei-djen, biochemist and historian (b. 1904)

== Sport ==
- Chinese Jia-A League 1991
- November 16–30 – 1991 FIFA Women's World Cup
