= 1993 in China =

- Decades: 1970s; 1980s; 1990s; 2000s; 2010s
- See also: Other events of 1993; History of China • Timeline • Years

The following lists events from 1993 in China.

== Incumbents ==
- General Secretary of the Communist Party: Jiang Zemin
- President: Yang Shangkun (until 27 March), Jiang Zemin (starting 27 March)
- Premier: Li Peng
- Vice President: Wang Zhen (until 5 March), Rong Yiren (starting 12 March)
- Vice Premier: Yao Yilin (until 5 March), Zhu Rongji (starting 25 March)

=== Governors ===
- Governor of Anhui Province – Fu Xishou
- Governor of Fujian Province – Jia Qinglin
- Governor of Gansu Province –
  - until January: Jia Zhijie
  - January–September: Yan Haiwang
  - starting September: Zhang Wule
- Governor of Guangdong Province – Zhu Senlin
- Governor of Guizhou Province – Wang Zhaowen then Chen Shineng
- Governor of Hainan Province – Liu Jianfeng then Ruan Chongwu
- Governor of Hebei Province – Cheng Weigao then Ye Liansong
- Governor of Heilongjiang Province – Shao Qihui
- Governor of Henan Province – Li Changchun then Ma Zhongchen
- Governor of Hubei Province – Guo Shuyan then Jia Zhijie
- Governor of Hunan Province – Chen Bangzhu
- Governor of Jiangsu Province – Chen Huanyou
- Governor of Jiangxi Province – Wu Guanzheng
- Governor of Jilin Province – Gao Yan
- Governor of Liaoning Province – Yue Qifeng
- Governor of Qinghai Province – Tian Chengping
- Governor of Shaanxi Province – Bai Qingcai
- Governor of Shandong Province – Zhao Zhihao
- Governor of Shanxi Province – Hu Fuguo then Sun Wensheng
- Governor of Sichuan Province – Zhang Haoruo then Xiao Yang
- Governor of Yunnan Province – Li Jiating
- Governor of Zhejiang Province – Wan Xueyuan

== Events ==
=== January ===
- January 10 — Miss Chinese International Pageant 1993 took place.
- January 9 — Shanghai Pudong Development Bank was founded.
- January 31 — According to Chinese government official confirmed report, a passenger train smash into a passenger bus in level crossing in Liaoning Province, kills 66 person, 29 person were hurt.

=== February ===
- February 14 — Linxi department store catches fire in Guye District, Tangshan, Hebei, killing 79 people.

=== April ===
- April 6 — China Eastern Airlines Flight 583.
- April 22 — The China National Space Administration is established.

=== May ===
- China competed at the East Asian Games from May 9 to May 18.

=== June ===
- Typhoon Koryn (1993) was formed on June 13 and hit China.

=== August ===
- August 27 — Gouhou Dam in Qinghai Province collapses killing at least 257.

=== October ===
- 1993 Shanghai International Film Festival took place from October 7 to 14.

=== Undated ===
- Antelope Enterprise Holdings business is founded in Jinjiang city, Fujian province.

== Deaths ==
- January 23
  - Kong Fei, politician (b. 1911)
  - Li Ziming, martial arts expert (b. 1902)
- February 3 — Tan Shaowen, politician (b. 1929)
- February 4 — Hou Baolin, Xiangsheng performer (b. 1917)
- February 5 — Huang Zhizhen, politician (b. 1920)
- February 13 — Song Xilian, Nationalist general (b. 1907)
- February 22 — Feng Zhi, writer and translator (b. 1905)
- February 27 — Zhao Zengyi, politician (b. 1920)
- March 3 — Xie Xuegong, politician (b. 1916)
- March 12 — Wang Zhen, 4th Vice President of China (b. 1908)
- March 22 — Sun Meiying, international table tennis player (b. 1931)
- April 6 — Chen Zaidao, general (b. 1909)
- May 4 — Wang Xianghao, mathematician (b. 1915)
- May 7 — Zhao Boping, politician (b. 1902)
- May 10 — Peng Mingzhi, general and diplomat (b. 1905)
- May 11 — Zhao Cangbi, official (b. 1916)
- June 2 — Mo Wuping, contemporary classical composer (b. 1958)
- June 30 — Wong Ka Kui, Hong Kong musician, singer and songwriter (b. 1962)
- July 12 — Li Da, general (b. 1905)
- July 25 — Gan Ku, politician (b. 1924)
- July 31 — Fang Zhichun, politician (b. 1905)
- August 17 — Feng Kang, mathematician (b. 1920)
- October 8 — Gu Cheng, poet, essayist and novelist (b. 1956)
- October 25 — Danny Chan, singer, songwriter and actor (b. 1958)
- November 24 — Zhou Peiyuan, theoretical physicist and politician (b. 1902)
- November 28 — Huang Oudong, politician (b. 1905)
- December 24 — Yen Chia-kan, chemist and nationalist politician, 2nd President of the Republic of China (b. 1905)
