= 1978 in China =

- Decades: 1950s; 1960s; 1970s; 1980s; 1990s
- See also: Other events of 1978; History of China • Timeline • Years

Events in the year 1978 in the People's Republic of China.

== Incumbents ==
- Paramount leader - Hua Guofeng → Deng Xiaoping
- Chairman of the Chinese Communist Party – Hua Guofeng
- Premier of China – Hua Guofeng
- Chairman of the Standing Committee of the National People's Congress – Ye Jianying
- Chairman of the Chinese People's Political Consultative Conference – Deng Xiaoping

=== Governors ===
- Governor of Anhui Province – Song Peizhang then Wan Li
- Governor of Fujian Province – Liao Zhigao
- Governor of Gansu Province – Song Ping
- Governor of Guangdong Province – Wei Guoqing
- Governor of Guizhou Province – Ma Li
- Governor of Hebei Province – Liu Zihou
- Governor of Heilongjiang Province – Yang Yichen
- Governor of Henan Province – Liu Jianxun then Duan Junyi
- Governor of Hubei Province – Zhao Xinchu then Chen Pixian
- Governor of Hunan Province – Mao Zhiyong
- Governor of Jiangsu Province – Xu Jiatun
- Governor of Jiangxi Province – Jiang Weiqing
- Governor of Jilin Province – Wang Enmao
- Governor of Liaoning Province – Zeng Shaoshan (until September), Ren Zhongyi (starting September)
- Governor of Qinghai Province – Tan Qilong
- Governor of Shaanxi Province – Wang Renzhong (until December), Wang Renzhong (starting December)
- Governor of Shandong Province – Bai Rubing
- Governor of Shanxi Province – Wang Qian
- Governor of Sichuan Province – Zhao Ziyang
- Governor of Yunnan Province – An Pingsheng
- Governor of Zhejiang Province – Tie Ying

== Events ==
The PRC passed its 1978 constitution.

=== December ===
- December 18 to 22 — 3rd Plenary Session of the 11th Central Committee of the Communist Party was held. The conference marked the beginning of the "Reform and Opening Up" policy.

=== Undated ===
- SIUI (Shantou Institute of Ultrasonic Instruments Co., Ltd) – ultrasound manufacturer is founded.

== Deaths ==
- January 17 — Wu Mi, one of the founders of Chinese comparative literature, critic, redologist, educator and poet (b. 1894)
- February 2 — Tang Chun-i, philosopher (b. 1909)
- February 3 — Jiang Lifu, mathematician and educator (b. 1890)
- March 27 — Li Jinxi, linguist and educator (b. 1890)
- April 20 — Lo Hsiang-lin, one of the most renowned researchers in Hakka language and culture (b. 1906)
- April 25 — Peng Shaohui, general of the People's Liberation Army (b. 1906)
- May 15
  - Shang Zhen, general of the National Revolutionary Army (b. 1888)
  - Ouyang Qin, politician (b. 1900)
- June 12 — Guo Moruo, author, poet, historian, archaeologist, and government official (b. 1892)
- June 30 — Yuan Muzhi, actor and director (b. 1909)
- August 3 — Luo Ruiqing, politician, army officer and general of the People's Liberation Army (b. 1906)
- December 1 — Lu Kanru, scholar of classical Chinese literature (b. 1903)

== See also ==
- 1978 in Chinese film
