= 1899 in China =

- Decades: 1870s; 1880s; 1890s; 1900s; 1910s
- See also: Other events of 1899; History of China • Timeline • Years

Events from the year 1899 in China.

== Incumbents ==
- Guangxu Emperor

=== Viceroys ===
- Viceroy of Zhili — Yulu
- Viceroy of Min-Zhe — Xu Yingkui
- Viceroy of Huguang — Zhang Zhidong
- Viceroy of Shaan-Gan — Tao Mo then Wei Guangtao
- Viceroy of Liangguang — Tan Zhonglin then Deshou
- Viceroy of Yun-Gui — Songfan
- Viceroy of Sichuan — Kuijun
- Viceroy of Liangjiang — Liu Kunyi

== Events ==
- October 18 - Battle of Senluo Temple, a clash between members of the "Militia United in Righteousness" (義和團) better known as the "Boxers") and Qing government troops that took place on October 18, 1899, near a temple located on the western edge of Pingyuan County in northwestern Shandong.
- November 13 - Hunan province opens to foreign trade for the first time.
- Chinese oracle bones from the former capital site of Yinxu are identified by academic Wang Yirong as carrying Shang dynasty writing.

== Births ==
- January 29 - Qu Qiubai, writer, poet and political activist
- August 21 - Fang Zhimin, military and political leader
- November 6 - Feng Zhanhai, military leader and government official
- November 18 - Li Lisan, politician
