= 1979 in China =

- Decades: 1950s; 1960s; 1970s; 1980s; 1990s
- See also: Other events of 1979; History of China • Timeline • Years

Events in the year 1979 in the People's Republic of China.

== Incumbents ==
- Chairman of the Chinese Communist Party – Hua Guofeng
- Premier of China – Hua Guofeng
- Chairman of the National People's Congress – Ye Jianying
- Chairman of the Chinese People's Political Consultative Conference – Deng Xiaoping
- Vice Premier of China – Deng Xiaoping

=== Governors ===
- Governor of Anhui Province – Wan Li then Zhang Jingfu
- Governor of Fujian Province – Liao Zhigao then Ma Xingyuan
- Governor of Gansu Province – Song Ping then Li Dengying
- Governor of Guangdong Province – Wei Guoqing then Xi Zhongxun
- Governor of Guizhou Province – Ma Li (until unknown)
- Governor of Hebei Province – Liu Zihou
- Governor of Heilongjiang Province – Yang Yichen then Chen Lei
- Governor of Henan Province – Duan Junyi then Liu Jie
- Governor of Hubei Province – Chen Pixian then Han Ningfu
- Governor of Hunan Province – Mao Zhiyong then Sun Guozhi
- Governor of Jiangsu Province – Xu Jiatun then Hui Yuyu
- Governor of Jiangxi Province – Jiang Weiqing then Bai Dongcai
- Governor of Jilin Province – Wang Enmao
- Governor of Liaoning Province – vacant
- Governor of Qinghai Province – Tan Qilong then Zhang Guosheng
- Governor of Shaanxi Province – Wang Renzhong then Yu Mingtao
- Governor of Shandong Province – Bai Rubing then Su Yiran
- Governor of Shanxi Province – Wang Qian then Luo Guibo
- Governor of Sichuan Province – Zhao Ziyang then Lu Dadong
- Governor of Yunnan Province – An Pingsheng then Liu Minghui
- Governor of Zhejiang Province – Tie Ying then Li Fengping

== Events ==
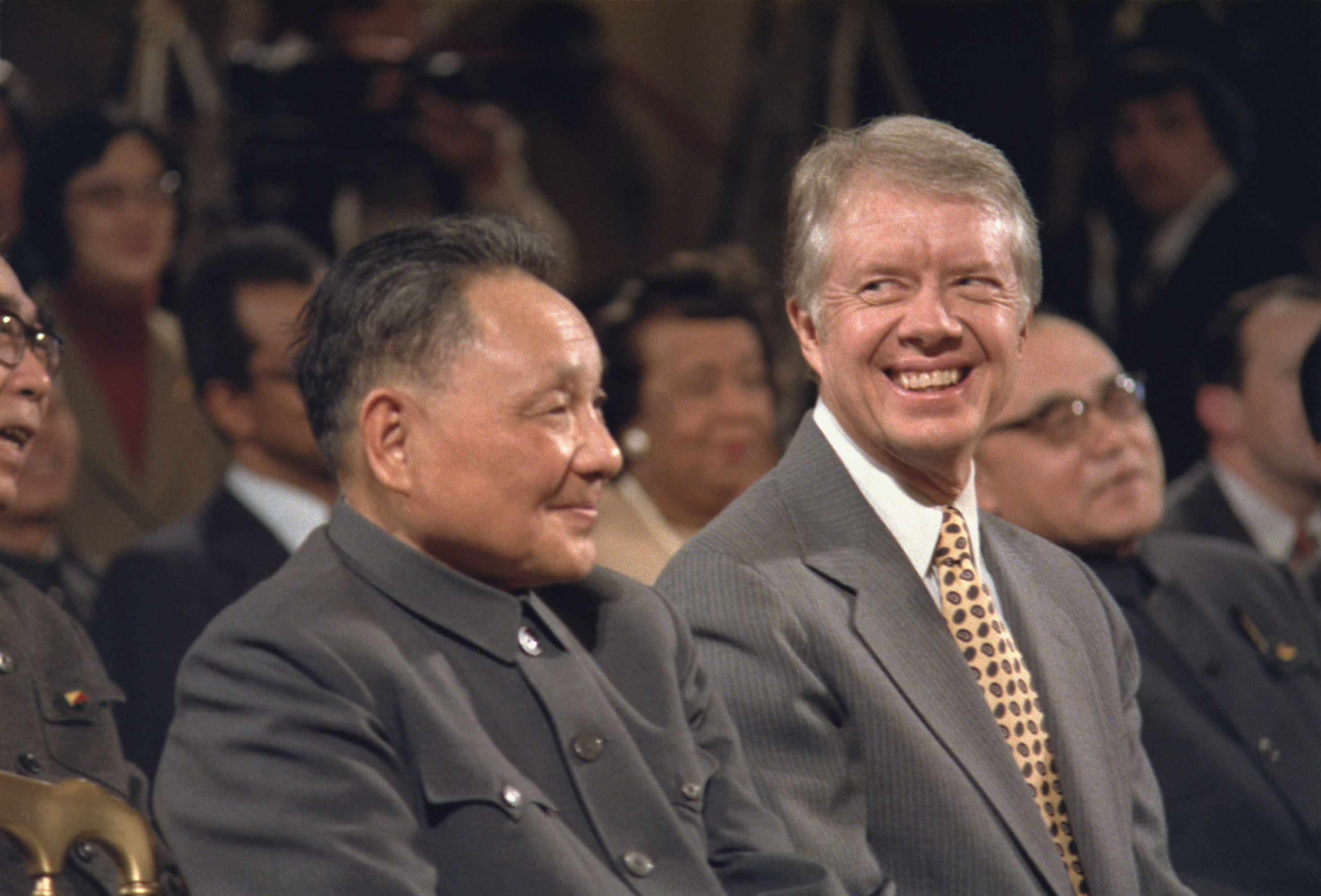
Vice Premier Deng Xiaoping with U.S. President Jimmy Carter, 31 January 1979

=== January ===
- January 1 — The United States broke diplomatic relations with Republic of China, and established diplomatic relations with the People's Republic of China.
- January - The One Child Policy is announced and implemented (est.)

=== February ===
- February 17 – The People's Republic of China invades northern Vietnam, launching the Sino-Vietnamese War.

=== March ===
- March 5 – Zhuhai County was upgraded to Zhuhai City.
- March 14 – In China, a Hawker Siddeley Trident crashes into a factory near Beijing, killing at least 260.

=== September ===
- September 27 – Stars Art Exhibition, the first independent art exhibition, takes place in Beihai Park, Beijing

== Births ==
- January 13 – Yang Wei, Badminton player
- February 9 – Zhang Ziyi, film actress
- February 17 – Xu Yunlong, footballer
- March 5 – Tang Gonghong, Chinese weightlifter
- March 12 – Liu Xuan, Gymnast
- March 14 – Gao Ling, badminton player
- May 15 – Li Yanfeng, discus thrower
- April 19 – Zhao Junzhe, footballer
- June 14 – Ma Ning, association football referee
- June 20 – Li Yi, footballer
- July 19 – Mo Huilan, gymnast
- August 15 – Tong Jian, pair skater
- August 27 – Tian Liang, diver
- September 18 – Bobo Chan, Musical artist
- October 5 – Gao Yuanyuan, actress and model
- October 7 – Tang Wei, actress
- December 10 – Yang Jianping, archer
- December 24 – Pang Qing, figure skater
- December 27 – Sa Dingding, folk singer and songwriter

== Deaths ==
- January 15 — Yang Zhongjian, vertebrate paleontologist (b. 1897)
- February 7
  - Su Zhenhua, general and politician (b. 1912)
  - Cui Wei, film director and actor (b. 1912)
- March 7 — Lei Chen, Taiwanese politician and dissident (b. 1897)
- March 12 — Zheng Xiaocang, writer, translator, and educator (b. 1892)
- March 30 — Tong Dizhou, embryologist (b. 1902)
- May 27 — Yao Zhe, lieutenant general of the People's Liberation Army (b. 1906)
- June 30 — Zhou Shidi, general of the People's Liberation Army (b. 1900)
- July 1 — Huang Minlon, organic chemist and pharmaceutical scientist (b. 1898)
- July 4 — Lee Wai Tong, Hong Kong and Chinese international association football player, head coach and former Vice President of FIFA (b. 1905)
- August 1 — Li Ji, influential archaeologist (b. 1896)
- August 14 — Wang Yun-wu, scholar of history and political science (b. 1888)
- August 27 — Shi Jianqiao, assassin of the Warlord Sun Chuanfang (b. 1905)
- September 25 — Zhou Libo, novelist and translator (b. 1908)
- October 13 — Chang Kia-ngau, banker, politician and scholar (b. 1889)
- December 3 — Zhang Guotao, revolutionary, founding member of the Chinese Communist Party and a rival to Mao Zedong (b. 1897)

== See also ==
- 1979 in Chinese film
