= 1905 in China =

- Decades: 1880s; 1890s; 1900s; 1910s; 1920s
- See also: Other events of 1905; History of China • Timeline • Years

Events from the year 1905 in China.

== Incumbents ==
- Guangxu Emperor (31st year)

=== Viceroys ===
- Viceroy of Zhili — Yuan Shikai
- Viceroy of Min-Zhe — Wei Guangtao then Shengyun then Songfan then Duanfang
- Viceroy of Huguang — Zhang Zhidong
- Viceroy of Shaan-Gan — Songfan then Shengyun
- Viceroy of Liangguang — Cen Chunxuan
- Viceroy of Yun-Gui — Ding Zhenduo
- Viceroy of Sichuan — Xiliang
- Viceroy of Liangjiang — Duanfang

== Events ==
- May 10 — Chinese Boycott of 1905 begins, it is a large-scale boycott of American goods in China in reaction to a string of anti-Chinese events in the United States.
  - The boycott originated when the Chinese Consolidated Benevolent Association of San Francisco called upon the people of China to pressure the United States into treating the Chinese immigrants in America better.
- Tibetan rebellion of 1905 in Yunnan province began with a series of attacks on Christian missionaries and converts and ended with the imperial Chinese government re-asserting control of the province.
- August 20 — Tongmenghui, a secret society and underground resistance movement, is founded by Sun Yat-sen, Song Jiaoren, and others in Tokyo, Japan

== Births ==
- February 13 — Yang Jingyu, communist, military commander and political commissar (d. 1940)
- February 28 — Xu Shiyou, general of the People's Liberation Army (d. 1985)
- March 5 — Dai Wangshu, poet, essayist and translator (d. 1950)
- March 15 — Zuo Quan, general in the Chinese Red Army and senior staff officer of the Eighth Route Army (d. 1942)
- April 26 — Xie Jinyuan, nationalist military officer (d. 1941)
- May 26 — Wang Shusheng, general, strategist and revolutionary (d. 1974)
- June 13
  - Chen Yun, revolutionary leader and one of the most influential leaders of China in the 1980s and 1990s (d. 1995)
  - Xian Xinghai, composer (d. 1945)
- September 17 — Feng Zhi, writer and translator (d. 1993)
- September 25 — Mao Zetan, younger brother of Mao Zedong (d. 1935)
- September 26 — Juliana Koo, Chinese-born American diplomat and supercentenarian (d. 2017)
- October — Zeng Xueming, Chinese wife of Ho Chi Minh (d. 1991)
- October 16 — Lee Wai Tong, association football player and head coach (d. 1979)
- October 25 — Gao Gang, leader of the Chinese Communist Party during the Chinese Civil War (d. 1954)
- December 11 — Jiao Juyin, director, translator and theater theorist (d. 1975)

== Deaths ==
- April 3 — Zou Rong, Chinese nationalist and revolutionary (b. 1885)
- June 3 — Hudson Taylor, protestant christian missionary (b. 1832)
- August 23 — Liu Bingzhang, scholar-official and general (b. 1826)
- December 8 — Chen Tianhua, revolutionary (b. 1875)
