= 1904 in China =

- Decades: 1880s; 1890s; 1900s; 1910s; 1920s
- See also: Other events of 1904; History of China • Timeline • Years

The following lists events that happened during 1904 in China.

== Incumbents ==
- Guangxu Emperor (30th year)

=== Viceroys ===
- Viceroy of Zhili — Yuan Shikai
- Viceroy of Min-Zhe — Li Xingrui then Wei Guangtao
- Viceroy of Huguang — Duanfang then Zhang Zhidong
- Viceroy of Shaan-Gan — Songfan
- Viceroy of Liangguang — Cen Chunxuan
- Viceroy of Yun-Gui — Ding Zhenduo
- Viceroy of Sichuan — Xiliang
- Viceroy of Liangjiang — Wei Guangtao then Li Xingrui

== Events ==
=== January ===
- January 13 — Zhang Zhidong and other advisers propose ending the civil service examinations.

=== February ===
- February 25 - Huang Xing and Song Jiaoren establish the revolutionary Society for the Revival of the Chinese Nation in Changsha.

=== March ===
- March — The Shanghai radical paper The Alarm Bell is shut down under German pressure
- March 31 - The British Indian Army and the Qing dynasty garrison troops in charge of Qumei Xingu exchanged fire. The British Indian Army slaughtered more than 700 people with machine guns and artillery.

=== April ===
- In mid-April - the British Indian Army entered the Gyantse County. In the face of the strong fortifications of Gyangzong Zongshan, the British army transferred more than 4,000 reinforcements and eight cannons from India and a large number of advanced armor-piercing projectiles.

=== June ===
- June 12 - the “Eastern Times“ was published in Shanghai, and was published by Japanese journalist Kotarō Munakata. The actual founder was Di Chuqing (狄楚青). At the beginning of the publication, Kang Youwei's student Luo Xiaogao served as the chief editor, and the newspaper became an important mouthpiece of Kang Youwei and Liang Qichao.
- June 21 — A special Imperial pardon is extended to all reformers of 1898, except Sun Yat-sen, Liang Qichao, and Kang Youwei
- Guangxi revolt of a Heaven and Earth Society (underway since 1902)
- June 24 — The Guangxi rebels take Liucheng

=== July ===
- July 7 - the British Indian Army captured Gyantse County, Zongshan.
- July 31 — The Imperial Court orders the governors of south China to suppress the Guangxi revolt after the rebels take Yishan

=== August ===
- August 3 - Lhasa was occupied by the British Indian Army, and the 13th Dalai Lama fled to Mongolia via Qinghai.
- August 24 — Imperial troops defeat the rebels at Yishan

=== September ===
- September 23 - October 5 — The Guangxi rebels briefly take Loshing

=== October ===
- October 17 - Zhang Boling founded Tianjin Nankai High School.

=== Nov / Dec ===
- November — The leader of the Guangxi revolt is captured by Imperial forces
- Nov / Dec — The secret ‘Restoration Society’ is established in Shanghai by revolutionary intellectuals (see 1910)
- 1904 — Sun Yat-sen publishes his manifesto Summary of the Revolution.

== Births ==
- August 22 — Deng Xiaoping, in Sichuan Paramount Leader of China (died 1997)
- November 28 — Zhao Zongyu, Chinese chemist and academician (died 1989)

== Deaths ==
- April 13 - Imperial Noble Consort Shushen, a consort of the Tongzhi Emperor of the Qing dynasty (b. 1859).
- Qiu Yufang, revolutionary, writer and feminist (b. 1871)
