= 1914 in China =

- Decades: 1890s; 1900s; 1910s; 1920s; 1930s
- See also: Other events of 1914; History of China • Timeline • Years

Events in the year 1914 in China. 1914年6月28日

== Incumbents ==
- President: Yuan Shikai
- Vice President: Feng Guozhang
- Premier: Xiong Xiling (until 12 February), Sun Baoqi (from 12 February to 1 May), Xu Shichang (from 1 May)

== Events ==
- Bai Lang Rebellion
- April 6 — Establishment of the Vicariate Apostolic of Kiaotsu, in Guangdong
- Siege of Tsingtao
- Simla Accord
- Establishment of the Zhongshan Park, in Shanghai
- Establishment of the Sin Hua Bank, in Beijing
- The capital of Guangxi Province is moved from Guilin to Nanning.

== Births ==
- January 4 — Chen Tingru, World War II army officer (d. 2017)
- January 8 — Li Tianyou, general in the People's Liberation Army (d. 1970)
- January 10 — Yu Kuo-hwa, Taiwanese economist (d. 2000)
- February 22 — Liu Chi-Sheng, pilot who fought in WWII, the Second Sino-Japanese War and the Chinese Civil War (d. 1991)
- March 5 — Jiang Qing, actress, leader of the Gang of Four and fourth wife of Mao Zedong (d. 1991)
- March 31 — Yang Yichen, politician (d. 1997)
- April 16 — Qiu Huizuo, lieutenant general of the People's Liberation Army (d. 2002)
- April 24 — Li Zuopeng, general in the People's Liberation Army (d. 2009)
- May 29 — Dong Xiwen, painter (d. 1973)
- June 6 — Zhang Jingfu, 5th Minister of Finance (d. 2015)
- June 12 — Go Seigen, Japanese Chinese master of game of Go (d. 2014)
- June 22 — Mei Zhi, children's author and essayist (d. 2004)
- September 28 — Gu Mu, former Vice Premier of China (d. 2009)
- October 5 — Zhang Zhen, former Vice Chairman of the Central Military Commission of the Chinese Communist Party (d. 2015)
- October 10 — Gong Peng, wartime spokeswoman for the Chinese Communist Party (d. 1970)
- October 22 — Zhang Guohua, 1st Secretary of the Tibet Autonomous Regional Committee of the Chinese Communist Party (d. 1972)
- October 27 — Yang Chengwu, revolutionary and general in the People's Liberation Army (d. 2004)
- November 15 — Yu Qiuli, politician, army officer and general in the People's Liberation Army (d. 1999)
- November 16 — Qin Jiwei, 7th Minister of National Defense (d. 1997)

== Deaths ==
- January 10 — Xia Ruifang, publisher (b. 1871)
- February 27 — Zhao Bingjun, 3rd Premier of the Republic of China (b. 1859)
