= Sichuan delegation to the National People's Congress =

Sichuan Delegation to the National People's Congress
- 全国人民代表大会四川省代表团
- Delegation for the National People's Congress
- Map showing the location of Sichuan Province
- Electoral unit: Sichuan Province
- Population: 83,674,866

Current Delegation
- Created: 1954
- Seats: 147
- Head of delegation: Wang Xiaohui
- Provincial People's Congress: Sichuan Provincial People's Congress

The Sichuan delegation to the National People's Congress is a delegation composed of deputies representing Sichuan Province within the National People's Congress (NPC), the supreme organ of state power of the People's Republic of China. NPC deputies from the Sichuan Province are officially elected by the Sichuan Provincial People's Congress.

== List of deputies ==
Year	NPC sessions	Deputies	Number of deputies	Ref.
1954	1st	Ding Daoheng, Yu Jiangzhen, Ba Jin, Wang Wending, Wang Yuhui, Wang Daozhou, Wang Weizhou, Tian Han, Wu Xiuquan, Zhu De, Ai Wu, Dan Maoxin, Wu Yuzhang, Wu Yuheng, Song Yuhe, Li Yimang, Li Dazhang, Li Bozhao, Li Chuli, Li Jieren, Li Zonglin, Li Xiaoting, Li Fudu, Sha Ting, Zhou Qinyue, Zhou Zezhao, Shao Quanlin, Hou Wailu, Shi Fuliang, Hu Feng, Fan Zhenhui, Xia Kangnong, Sun Zhiyuan, Xu Boxin, Xu Chonglin, Sangji Yuexi, Suo Guanying, Neng Hai, Yuan Zhixian, Zhang Wenzhi, Zhang Xiushu, Zhang Sizhou, Zhang Jingwu, Zhang Jichun, Zhang Lan, Liang Hua, Zhang Naiqi, Guo Moruo, Chen Wengui, Chen Gang, Chen Xiaolan, Chen Li, Peng Shaonong, Peng Dixian, Cheng Zijian, Tong Shaosheng, Hua Ergongchenglie, He Cheng, Yang Hansheng, Huang Jiqing, Huang Yumen, Yang Daidi, Yang Yiping, Jia Peizhi, Liao Jingdan, Liao Suhua, Xiong Kewu, Xiong Shangyuan, Pei Changhui, Zhao Shilan, Zhao Chaogou, Liu Wenhui, Liu Chengzhao, Pan Dakui, Deng Fangzhi, Deng Xihou, Lu Zihe, Xiao Longyou, Yan Hongyan, Sa Kongliao, Sa Fujun, Xie Lihui, Zhong Tigan, Lan Tian, Luo Wencai, Luo Shifa, Su Xin: By-election on July 16, 1955: Chen Shufang; By-election on June 29, 1957: Ke Zhao, Hou Guangjiong, Zeng Shufan, Gu Zhibiao, Lang Yuxiu	89	
1959	2nd	Wang Wenbin, Wang Shoucai, Wang Haimin, Wang Daozhou, Wang Weizhou, Deng Xiaoping, Deng Fangzhi (female), Deng Xihou, Ba Jin, Wazhamuji, Niguguoguo (female), Lu Zihe, Tian Yiping, Tian Han, Tian Jingqi, An Dengyin, Liu Wenhui, Liu Xiyuan (female), Liu Chengzhao, Liu Ang (female), Liu Xingyuan, Yang Hansheng, Ai Wu, Zhu De, Wu Wencai, Ren Baige, Hua Ergong, Cheng Lie, Sha Ting, Su Xin, Li Dazhang, Li Bozhao (female), Li Zonglin, Li Chuli, Li Jieren, Li Sizhi, Chen Wengui, Chen Xinren, Chen Shufang (female), Chen Xiaolan, Chen Pengnian, Wu Yuzhang, Wu Yuheng, Yu Qiuli, Gu Zhibiao, Cheng Xiaofa, He Ju, He Yuanhai, Dan Maoxin, Zheng Shaowen, Lin Jiayong, Zhang Wenzhi, Zhang Wenjin, Zhang Weijiong, Zhang Tianyi, Zhang Jichun, Zhang Lizhen (female), Zhang Xiushu, Zhang Sizhou, Zhang Jingwu, Awang Jiacuo, Ahou Lumuzi, Shao Quanlin, Guojimugu, Luo Wencai, Luo Shifa, Luo Ruiqing, Jin Xiru, Zhou Qinyue, Zhou Zezhao, Shi Fuliang, Zhao Erlu, Rong Ke, Hu Zi'ang, Ke Zhao, Jiangyang Bomu (female), Hou Wailu, Hou Guangjiong, Hou Defeng, Lang Yuxiu (female), Suo Guanying, Yuan Zhixian, Xia Kedaodeng, Xia Kangnong, Sangji Yuexi, Xu Boxin, Neng Hai, Guo Moruo, Xiao Longyou, Xiao Songli, Xiao Zeke, Tong Xiaopeng, Tong Shaosheng, Feng Xuan, Peng Dixian, Huang Jiqing, Huang Rongchang, Huang Yumen, Cheng Zijian, Cheng Shaojiong, Lei Congmin, Lan Tian, Yang Kaiqu, Liao Jingdan, Liao Shigang, Liao Zhigao, Liao Suhua (female), Pei Changhui, Xiong Kewu, Xiong Shangyuan, Lai Jifa, Yan Hongyan, Xie Lihui, Zhong Tigan, Nie Rongzhen, Sa Kongliao, Tan Wenbin, Gong Yinbing	117	
1964	3rd	Ma Like, Ma Yunwu, Ma Jianyou, Wang Wenbin, Wang Zhaocheng, Wang Liang, Wang Shouchang, Wang Dingyi, Wang Shaonan, Wang Yanli, Wang Haimin, Wang Suzhen, Wang Weizhou, Wang Daozhou, Wazhamuji, Renqin Duoji, Deng Fangzhi, Deng Zugen, Feng Tianming, Gan Cisen, Gan Tang, Ai Wu, Zuo Liliang, Zuo Jingjian, Shi Jianyuan, Shi Pu, Tian Yiping, Tian Jiaying, Tian Jingqi, Le Yicheng, Situ Yuwang, Jiang Qingfen, An Dengyin, Liu Wenhui, Liu Yunbo, Liu Huanyu, Liu Ang, Liu Jianxi, Liu Chengzhao, Liu Xingyuan, Liu Emming, Zhuang Tao, Mi Jianshu, Xu Deji, Bi Dexian, Zhu Baocui, Zhu De, Wu Wencai, Hua Ergongchenlie, Xiang Guangdi, Mu Zexian, Sun Ziquan, Sun Ziqiang, Shama Wuzhi, Sha Yunhe, Sha Ting, Min Enze, Kela Mentai, Su Xin, Du Qiongshu, Li Dazhang, Li Kaizhen, Li Jingquan, Li Shaoyan, Li Bozhao, Li Zonglin, Li Tangbin, Li Peigen, Li Bin, Li Sizhi, Li Dequan, Yang Wanxuan, Yang Yunkui, Yang Xingye, Yang Mo, Yang Kunchao, Yang Shangkun, Yang Hongzu, Li Guguoge, Wu Yuzhang, Wu Shiying, Wu Quanheng, Wu Yingqi, Wu Zukai, Wu Xue, Wu Ruijing, Wu Xiying, Yu Qiuli, Gu Zhibiao, Qiu Jinyun, He Wenjun, He Yuxing, He Guangjiu, He Yinglin, He Qifang, He Zhongxiao, He Ju, Dan Maoxin, Zhang Zifu, Zhang WenzhiZhang Wenjin, Zhang Weijiong, Zhang Tianyi, Zhang Yunxiang, Zhang Pingjiang, Zhang Rubin, Zhang Lianhua, Zhang Lizhen, Zhang Xiushu, Zhang Jichun, Zhang Sizhou, Zhang Qi, Zhang Jingwu, Zhang Binwu, Zhang Lirong, Zhang Shaofang, Lu Huansheng, Awang Jiacuo, Ahou Lumuzi, Chen Zhichang, Chen Wengui, Chen Shufang, Chen Xinren, Chen Yuping, Chen Xiaolan, Chen Li, Chen Hu, Chen Daochong, Chen Pengnian, Chen Manyuan, Shao Quanlin, Zheng Lanhua, Zheng Shou, Zheng Yanfen, Zheng Peiliang, Zheng Ying, Lang Yuxiu, Lada, Fan Minglang, Lin Tian, Lin Keqin, Guojimugu, Ming Zongxiu, Luo Wencai, Luo Shifa, Luo Qingchang, Luo Chenglie, Luo Jiahui, Jin Xiru, Zhou Tongbi, Zhou Zezhao Zhou Guoquan, Zhou Qinyue, Zhou Huiruo, Zhou Xude, Jiangyang Bomu, Hong Hui, Luorang Zenggen, Shi Fuliang, Xiang Zhaba Songdian, Zhao Shilan, Zhao Xianhai, Zhao Cangbi, Hu Ziang, Hu Yunsheng, Hu Jiwei, Hu Daoji, Hu Yaobang, Ke Zhao, Zhong Fuguang, Hou Wailu, Hou Guangjiong, Hou Ceming, Hou Defeng, He Changqun, Hai Naishigu, Jing Hua, Gao Dehou, Guo Moruo, Tang Qingquan, Tang Pu, Suo Guanying, Yuan Zhixian, Jin Chuan, Nie Rongzhen, Xiaode Zhaxi Lacuo, Xia Gengfang, Xia Kangnong, Gu Kangle, Ni Bing, Xu Zhongshu, Xu Boxin, Xu Xi, Sangji Yuexi, Xiao Zeke, Xiao Huaqing, Sakongliao, Cao Zhongliang, Cao Huiwen, Gong Yinbing, Da Yuanlun, Wen Shaohe, Tong Xiaopeng, Tong Shaosheng, Zeng Yifan, Zeng Mian, Xie Lihui, Peng Shiyi, Peng Guangwei, Peng Jiucheng, Peng Dixian, Huang Jiqing, Huang Kewei, Huang Yumen, Huang Rongchang, Huang Yin, Jiang Daojiang, Jiang Mingqian, Jiang Jintao, Gu Maozhi, Han Huiqing, Shui Xiheng, Cheng Zijian, Cheng Shifu, Cheng Shaojiong, Fu Wenqi, Lu Bo, Lei Congmin, Pu Yunde, Lan Tian, Liao Zhigao, Liao Suhua, Tan Wenbin, Pei Changhui, Xiong Kewu, Xiong Shangyuan, Xiong Jiguang, Miao Hailing, Pan Qingzhou, Fan Peilu	140	
1975	4th	Yu Liwen, Feng Guiqiong, Wang Yongshen, Wang Maoquan, Wang Jie, Wang Shusheng, Wang Guiyuan, Wang Xiqing, Wang Xialing, Wang Yaoxian, Zhaxi Zeren, Mao Chunfa, Deng Hua, Deng Fangzhi, Shi Guangqian, Tian Shufang, Tian Jingqi, Dai Huiming, Feng Bigui, Si Laigong, Ji Niu Buha, Zhu De, Ren Xiande, Xiang Renhou, Xiang Tingxiao, Liu Yizhen, Liu Dayong, Liu Wenqin, Liu Zhengbin, Liu Xingyuan, Liu Yuanquan, Liu Guomin, Liu Bingwen, Liu Rongcheng, Liu Zhendong, Liu Shubi, Su Jiashaqie, Du Xinyuan, Du Qiongshu, Wu Fang'an, Li Dazhang, Li Shaoyan, Li Zhongyi, Li Shibi, Li Jun, Li Xiuyun, Li Linzhi, Li Jianxiu, Li Hongcai, Li Zhen Li Li, Li Zhigui, Li Fuyuan, Yang Changsheng, Yang Bangrun, Yang Lunxuan, Yang Rudai, Yang Yunlie, Yang Zhicheng, Yang Baoqian, Yang Dinglun, Yang Shuncai, Yang Fushan, Yang Futian, Wu Congke, Wu Dongshui, Wu Shaowen, Wu Zhuhui, Wu Sengxiao, Qiu Xianzong, He Yunfeng, Dan Kunrong, Yu Guangmei, Zou Qingrong, Zhang Yuhua, Zhang Guangming, Zhang Xinghua, Zhang Xingqun, Zhang Li, Zhang Yingxiang, Zhang Huchen, Zhang Jiazhen, Aden, Chen Xianying, Chen Changfu, Chen Nengkuan, Chen Shenzhai, Lin Shouyi, Lin Maosen, Shang Junfang, Guo Jimugu, Luo Changhua, Luo Junguo, Luo Chongzhen, Yue Shuiqing, Yue Lin, Suodeng, Zhou Yuqing, Zhou Junnan, Zhou ZhongxuZhou Qinyue, Zhou Jiayu, Zhou Yinping, Pang Delan, Zheng Bangguo, Zheng Hongli, Zewang, Jiangyang Bomu, Hu Fengtian, Hu Zhifang, Ke Zhao, Zhong Yingui, Zhong Shuhua, Zhong Jiayu, Juelolamen, Ao Renliang, Yuan Banglian, Geng Deyuan, Qian De, Xu Rongjiang, Gao Fengming, Gao Mingping, Guo Wanju, Guo Wenxuan, Tang Kebi, Tang Zhenrong, Tao Zhengxiu, Huang Yongxi, Huang Huaqing, Huang Rongchang, Huang Lian, Cao Zhongliang, Chang Changle, Liang Boying, Liang Sulan, Liang Suzhen, Peng Dixian, Peng Jiazhi, Jiang Rongfu, Jiang Ximing, Jiang Dewen, Han Shiliang, Han Renyu, Yu Jing, Hei Chunfang, Ranba Zhaxi, Tong Shaosheng, You Shouxing, Lai Hongde, Cai Fuying, Pei Changhui, Xiong Guoqing, Yan Lunyang, Xue Xiangde	157	
1978	5th	Ding Changhe, Ding Xuesong, Ma Changsheng, Ma Yunwu, Wang Yichun, Wang Daigui, Wang Zhaocheng, Wang Xing, Wang Huaiwen, Wang Liangmei, Wang Xianshu, Wang Yanli, Wang Bingwan, Wang Meiyu, Wang Ganchang, Wang Tengbo, Wang Lizhi, Wang Depeng, Mao Sufang, Wen Subsequent, Yin Xuejin, Deng Jincai, Ai Wansheng, Ye Yufu, Tian Jingqi, Feng Tianming, Feng Guangzhen, Feng Jinzhang, Feng Zhenwu, Feng Demin, Lan Zhenyou, Ji Niu Buha, Zhu Dahong, Zhu Guangyi, Zhu Kaijun Zhu Yunze, Zhu Xuezhen, Ren Mingdao, Ren Zhiwei, Duo Quzhen, Liu Dajun, Liu Yunbo, Liu Yunzhong, Liu Yongxiang, Liu Xingbiao, Liu Guomin, Liu Bingwen, Liu Xueyuan, Liu Shubi, Liu Fuyin, Mi Jianshu, Jiang Xinhua, Tang Fulin, Xu Guangfu, Xu Zhongzhi, Ji Tingqiong, Xu Tengba, Que Guixiang, Yan Jinqing, Yan Huizhen, Su Yihai, Su Jiashaqie, Du Xinyuan, Du Qiongshu, Wu Fang'an, Li Shaoyan, Li Renshu, Li Zhengchuan, Li Shihui, Li Dongyun, Li Shih-bi, Li Yong-xun, Li Xian-ming, Li Zhao-liang, Li Xuan, Li Ying - jie, Li Lin-zhi, Li Guo - chao, Li Bing-dong, Li Bao-shu, Li Shi -fen, Li Xiang- shan, Li Zhen, Li Zhi-gui, Yang Yi-xi, Yang Bang-run, Yang Lun -xuan, Yang Guo -xiang, Yang Guo-shun, Yang Shun-cai, Yang Chao, Yang Fu-tian, Wu Yong - qun, Wu Xiu-ling, Wu Ming- fa, Wu Shao-wen, Wu Zu-kai, Wu Zhu - hui, He Da-guang, He Tian-chong, He Zhong-ming, He Guo-ying, He Gui-yi, He Gao-qing, He Fu-xiang, Gu Zhi-biao, Zou Qing-rong, Sha Yun - he, Song Ren-qiong, Song Xi - yuan, Zhang Yun-xiang, Zhang Zheng - tao, Zhang Xing - hua, Zhang Xiu - shu, Zhang Hu-chen, Zhang Bing-hua, Zhang Jia-zhen, Zhang Juan, Zhang Yan, A- deng Chen Shufang, Chen Qingyuan, Chen Chuiwan, Chen Gengyun, Lin Shouyi, Guo Jimugu, Luo Zhuoli, Luo Qingchang, Luo Xuecheng, Luo Chenglie, Luo Tongda, Suo Deng, Jin Fuzhong, Jin Xiru, Zhou Qinyue, Zhou Gendi, Zhou Lirong, Zhou Yinping, Zhou Ying, Zhou Delong, Zheng Fang, Meng Dongbo, Jiang Yangbomu, Zhao Qingzhi, Zhao Ziyang, Hu Ziang, Hu Zhifang, Hu Jiwei, Rufuyi, Ke Zhao, Hou Guangjiong, Yu Qianli, Shi Jiaming, Rongmuta, Yuan Banglian, Geng Deyuan, Nie Ronggui, Nie Junqing, Jin Chuan, Jia Guanghou, Qian Wuhuang, Qian Xueying, Qian De, Xu Boxin, Xu Xi, Gao Weilong, Guo Moruo, Tang Kebi, Jing Hua, Tao ZhengxiuHuang Kaihua, Huang Kai, Huang Rongchang, Huang Senrong, Cao Chunchang, Cao Zhongliang, Chang Changle, Cui Yaoou, Kang Zhisheng, Liang Boying, Liang Sulan, Peng Xinlian, Peng Yaoji, Peng Xiuying, Peng Youqing, Peng Xianqing, Peng Dixian, Jiang Zhiquan, Jiang Rongfu, Han Yonghong, Shui Xiheng, Tong Shaosheng, Zeng Delin, Xie Junqing, Lai Hongde, Lei Zhonghui, Lei Mingxiu, Lei Lei Guwa, Pei Changhui, Liao Xuecheng, Liao Shiquan, Liao Hourong, Xiong Fu, Fan Peilu, Pan Chuanxian, Pan Daochong, Xue Wancai, Wei Wenfu	208	
1983	6th	Ding Weishu, Ding Houchang, Ma Like, Ma Yunwu, Ma Shitu, Wang Ziping, Wang Wenbin, Wang Xianhua, Wang Xianjun, Wang Xianqi, Wang Ruquan, Wang Huaiwen, Wang Yanli, Wang Ao, Wang Ganchang, Wang Qian, Wang Tengbo, Wang Degong, Wang Deli, Fang Jiqian, Yin Xueming, Yin Siming, Ai Lianyue, Gu Gengyu, Shi Wenying, Shi Shengzhong, Shi Lei, Pingcuo Wangjie, Ye Yinting, Tian Yiping, Tian Weizhi, Tian Jingqi, Shi Zhiyi, Bai Ren, Bai Shangwu, Feng Tianming, Feng Guoliang, Feng Zhongyi, Feng Demin, Jiyue Shagemo, Ren Mingdao, Liu Yunbo, Liu Yunzhong, Liu Er, Liu Xingbiao, Liu Jichang, Liu Yingming, Liu Changmo, Liu Yingqun, Liu Heng Yu, Jiang Yongjing, Jiang Hongshu, Jiang Xiaofang, Tang Kuancong, Xu Ning, Sun Xianyu, Sun Chuanqi, Ke Fei, Su Keming, Du Xinyuan, Du Qiongshu, Wu Fang'an, Li Shaoyan, Li Shijie, Li Jun, Li Bingdong, Li Baoshu, Li Yizhang, Li Zhen, Li Zhenbang, Li Yuan, Li Defen, Li Zuanren, Yang Feng, Yang Bangrun, Yang Xizong, Yang Guopan, Yang Xuejun, Yang Xingliang, Yang Guiyuan, Yang Chao, Yang Ruxian, Xiao Ying, Wu Dacheng, Wu Zhuhui, Wu Shengju, Cen Zhongquan, He Wanzhong, He Tianchong, He Yuxing, He Youjin, He Zhongming, He Haoju, He Guiyi, He Xiaoqing, Zou Haitao, Wang Changhui, Song Kaiyuan, Song Tingxiu, Zhang YunxiangZhang Fengtai, Zhang Dongqin, Zhang Tinghan, Zhang Anju, Zhang Canming, Zhang Xianwen, Zhang Shaoxian, Zhang Yaobi, Zhang Suzhen, Zhang Ping, Zhang Xijun, Aga Yueqie, Azeng Naimo, Chen Shufang, Chen Lifen, Chen Gang, Chen Xiankun, Chen Huahua, Chen Haosu, Chen Zongbai, Chen Chengzhi, Chen Zuxiang, Chen Weifu, Chen Hu, Chen Linzhang, Gou Wenbin, Fan Yuping, Guojimugu, Luo Pingya, Luo Zhuoli, Luo Chenglie, Luo Xiangwen, Luo Ming, Luo Qiong, Luo Zhetan, Jin Xiru, Suodeng, Zhou Yanchun, Zhou Qinyue, Zhou Ying, Zhou Dexing, Pang Xue, Zheng Fang, Ze Rong, Qu Quanpiao, Jiang Yangbomu, Zhao Minguang, Zhao Yuqiao, Zhao Deqing, Hu Jiwei Ke Zhao, Erjia, Ese, Hou Guangjiong, Shi Jiaming, He Fengchen, Rongmuta, Nie Ronggui, Suo Guantao, Xia Wanjie, Xia Yubing, Xia Zongming, Qian Wuhuang, Qian De, Xu Zhongshu, Xu Shiqun, Xu Shangzhi, Xu Mingguo, Xu Chonglin, Xu Xi, Gao Qingshi, Gao Hongen, Gao Sufang, Tang Congguo, Tang Changxiang, Jing Hua, Huang Quanchun, Huang Xingrong, Huang Weilu, Huang Xianxiu, Huang Rongchang, Cao Jianyou, Cao Huiwen, Kang Zhisheng, Zhang Zengrong, Liang Wulin, Sui Demei, Peng Dixian, Han Yonghong, Lu Chongyi, Zeng Tianhua, Zeng Xianyu, Zeng Xiangwen, Zeng Fanwei, Xie Guifang, Zang Dihua, Pei Changhui, Zhai Wenrong, Xiong Fu, Fan Peilu, Pan Da Kui	202	
1988	7th	Ding Weishu, Yu Hanqing, Ma Like, Ma Yongli, Ma Shitu, Wang Dade, Wang Ziping, Wang Renjun, Wang Yaping, Wang Shuwen, Wang Mijun, Wang Yanli, Wang Ao, Wang Liwen, Wang Xianji, Wang Yuanfeng, Wang Fuxing, Wang Huicai, Wang Degong, Wang Deli, Mujia Buzhi, Wazhamuji, Shuipu Laomao, Mao Zilin, Renzhen Wangxiu, Deng Xianghui, Ai Lianyue, Gu Gengyu, Pingcuo Wangjie, Lu Tiecheng, Lu Daocai, Danke, Ye Yinting, Ye Junmei, Bai Zailin, Bai Shangwu, Feng Xiyao, Feng Demin, Jijue Ajia, Zhu Shengke, Zhu Yumin, Hua Dejun, Xiang Deke, Liu Yunbo, Liu Wenke, Liu Shuming, Liu Jichang, Liu Yingming, Liu Yingjie Liu Bingyao, Liu Jinlong, Liu Yuren, Liu Shibai, Liu Shifu, Liu Shaoxian, Liu Xiaoping, Jiang Yongjing, Jiang Zejia, Xu Ning, Mou Ling, Mou Xuheng, Yan Shenggui, Su Keming, Du Qiongshu, Li Shaoyan, Li Lemin, Li Yumao, Li Keguang, Li Yingjie, Li Songwang, Li Guoda, Li Zhenbang, Li Peiquan, Yang Feng, Yang Dongqiao, Yang Daidi, Yang Rulan, Yang Kezong, Yang Songying, Yang Lingduoji, Yang Guiyuan, Yang Meifen, Yang Chao, Xiao Guangcheng, Xiao Yang, Wu Dacheng, Wu Zhuhui, Wu Qunmei, Qiu Guobin, He Wanzhong, He Yuxing, He Haoju, She Guohua, Xin Zhesheng, Wang Changhui, Song Rufen, Zhang Yunxiang, Zhang Renliang, Zhang Fengtai, Zhang WenkangZhang Wencheng, Zhang Yongyan, Zhang Tinghan, Zhang Qingshou, Zhang Anju, Zhang Xianwen, Zhang Xiaoling, Zhang Haoruo, Zhang Xijun, Lu Zhengqun, Adiluoqu, Chen Shufang, Chen Chengzhi, Chen Dengfa, Chen Jingju, Shao Qichang, Fan Yuping, Lin Shizheng, Lin Jianchun, Yi Mingjun, Luo Pingya, Luo Zhetan, Jin Yiyu, Jin Hairun, Zhou Yong, Zhou Chengmei, Zhou Gengxin, Zhou Ying, Zhou Dian'ao, Zerong, Jiangyang Bomu, Zhao Shibi, Zhao Ermi, Zhao Minguang, Hao Zhenxian, Hu Daiguang, Hu Xingxiang, Hu Jiwei, Hu Maozhou, Hu Yaobang, Ke Zhao, Zhong Xinyuan, Xianggen Badengduoji, Hou Guangjiong, Hou Tonghe, Zhu Youli, Fei Ziwen, He Fang, He Fengchen Rou Luo, Qin Dengtian, Suo Guantao, Xia Wanjie, Xia Zongming, Chai Yunzhen, Qian Wuhuang, Qian Shangjie, Qian Min, Qian De, Ni Heling, Xu Shangzhi, Xu Chonglin, Xu Xi, Ling Luoda, Gao Xianhua, Gao Sufang, Guo Yan, Xi Yifang, Tang Changxiang, Tang Zhangjin, Jing Hua, Tu Yongfu, Huang Yongguang, Huang Qizhao, Huang Jiren, Huang Jiafu, Cao Xiuqing, Cao Jianyou, Sheng Xiuying, Chang Siqie, Kang Zhenhuang, Liang Shangquan, Xu Junhai, Peng Dixian, Peng Shaoqing, Peng Jian, Jiang Yiwei, Jiang Dengfu, Han Chunhua, Cheng Yiju, Fu Jianzhang, Zeng Pingjiang, Zeng Henghua, Xie Taifeng, Pu Zequan, Lei Hengshun, Cai Shugen, Zang Dihua, Pei Changhui, Zhai WenrongXiong Fu, Pan Da Kui, Wei Wen Yan	203	
1993	8th	Yu Hanqing, Tudeng Nima, Ma Kaiming, Ma Lin, Wang Wende, Wang Kezhi, Wang Chongweng, Wang Xingpu, Wang Rucen, Wang Shuwen, Wang Jinxiang, Wang Zhoulong, Wang Rongxuan, Wang Ao, Wang Jiafu, Wang Hongju, Wang Yuanfeng, Wang Jialing, Shui Pu Laomao, Deng Yangzhong, Zuo Mingzhong, Shi Wanjian, Lu Daocai, Danke, Ye Junmei, Ye Yushan, Dai Xianlu, Bai Shize, Bai Shangwu, Bai Meiqing, Feng Kexu, Feng Bohe, Feng Chongtai, Ni Mei, Jimukeda, Zhu Yu, Zhu Shengke, Zhu Yumin, Wu Jinghua, Ren Zuoying, Ren Shaohui, Xiang Zhonghuai, Wu Hequan, Liu Wenke, Liu Yunsheng, Liu Jiazan, Liu Jibai, Liu Peng, Qi Linshan, Xu Junjian Sun Tongchuan, Sun Changqiong, Mou Xuheng, Yan Shenggui, Yan Rugao, Su Keming, Li Dingyi, Li Taiyin, Li Fangzheng, Li Yuxiang, Li Lemin, Li Dachang, Li Keguang, Li Boyong, Li Songwang, Li Zhiyin, Li Juncong, Li Zhenbang, Li Du, Li Shenkuan, Yang Feng, Yang Daidi, Yang Rulan, Yang Rudai, Yang Zhiming, Yang Xizong, Yang Songying, Yang Zongyi, Yang Meifen, Yang Zhenzhong, Yang Tonglan, Yang Mali, Xiao Yang, Wu Yinyi, Wu Weixin, Wu Guofen, Wu Zhuhui, He Wanzhong, He Tianrong, He Tianxiang, He Haoju, He Qinggui, He Xuerong, He Luwei, She Guohua, Zou Jiahua, Xin Zhesheng, Wang Linlin, Shen Zhiyun, Shen QinZhang Wanquan, Zhang Shan, Zhang Wenbin, Zhang Yongyan, Zhang Anju, Zhang Qishao, Zhang Yuren, Zhang Yanning, Zhang Meihui, Abu Niuhei, Acheng, Chen Dapeng, Chen Zisheng, Chen Guangguo, Chen Changzhi, Chen Mingqiong, Chen Chengzhi, Chen Xianchuan, Chen Aimin, Chen Kuanjin, Lin Xianze, Ouyang Cheng, Luo Kaizhong, Luo Tongda, Ji Yingzhu, Yue Longfang, Zhou Shiyong, Zhou Xianlan, Zhou Guanglong, Zhou Deqin, Zenizu, Lang Sanqing, Qu Kuning, Jing Fuqian, Zhao Wenxin, Zhao Ermi, Zhao Zhongyu, Zhao Chunmei, Zhao Minguang, Hao Shiwei, Hu Min, Hu Dezhong, Hu Maozhou, Liu Enmei, Zhong Shuliang, Xianggen Badengduoji, Zhong Mingzhao, Fei Ziwen, Yao Wuding, He Fang, Qin Wanxiang, Yuan Changyu, Yuan Jingkui, Suo Guantao, Qian Shangjie, Ni Heling, Xu Shangzhi, Xu Zongjun, Xu Jing, Xu Xi, Gao Xianhua, Gao Sufang, Guo Daiyi, Xi Yifang, Tang Ning, Tang Fachun, Tan Tingfeng, Tao Xihui, Huang Yufang, Huang Yongguang, Huang Xuequn, Huang Jiren, Huang Jiafu, Huang Yinkui, Huang Jinhua, Cao Qingze, Kang Zhenhuang, Liang Dabi, Liang Shugao, Peng Fusheng, Ge Shaokang, Dong Deming, Jiang Fuchen, Jiang Dengfu, Han Xingwang, Han Guobin, Yu Dengrong, Fu Shiting, Zeng Pingjiang, Zeng Xiaoping, Zeng Henghua, Zeng Xianlin, Xie Taifeng, Xie Shijie, Xie Mingdao, Pu Zequan, Lei Hengshun, Lei Fuquan, Cai Shugen, Zang DihuaPei Xiangfu, Tan Xijin, Xiong Zhonglan, Teng Chuanli, Wei Wenyan	205	
1998	9th	Yu Mingqiang, Tudeng Nima (Tibetan), Ma Kaiming (Yi), Ma Guizhen (Yi), Wang Li, Wang Kezhi, Wang Chongweng (Tibetan), Wang Ande, Wang Rucen, Wang Yushun (Tibetan), Wang Jinxiang, Wang Zhizhong, Wang Shiwen (Tibetan), Wang Rongxuan, Wang Jiafu, Wang Jingrong, Shuipu Laomao (Yi), Yin Zhijun, Deng Jian, Lu Daocai, Jiadeng Luorong Xiangba (Tibetan), Tian Jiwan, Shi Youzuo (Yi), Dai Xianlu, Nimei (Tibetan), Zhu Tiankai, Zhu Wenming, Zhu Zu Liang, Zhu Shengke, Wu Jinghua (Yi ethnic group), Ren Zhenglong, Ren Zuoying, Liu Yunsheng, Liu Youlin, Liu Yingming, Liu Qishan (Miao ethnic group), Liu Changjie, Liu Xiaofeng, Liu Xiaofeng, Xu Junjian, Mou Xuheng (Tujia ethnic group), Ji Jinshan, Du Yuanyao, Du Jiang, Du Dinghui, Li Zhixia, Li Fangzheng, Li Pingwei, Li Lemin, Li Dachang, Li Keming, Li Jiashun, Li Jikai, Li Dunbo, Li Meng, Yang Zhanchang, Yang Likang, Yang Ganggang, Yang Rulan, Yang Zhiwen, Yang Xizong, Yang Songying (Qiang ethnic group) Yang Zongyi, Yang Jie (Yi ethnicity), Yang Chonghui, Yang Min, Yang Lu, Xiao Chiquan, Wu Yinyi, Wu Xiaoping, Wu Dengchang, He Chengli, He Mingfen, He Qingrui, He Qiongying, He Biying, She Guohua, Yu Daquan, Zou Guangyan, Zou Jiahua, Zou Chaobi, Song Hesheng, Song Baorui, Zhang Zhongwei, Zhang Anju, Zhang Zuoha (Yi ethnicity), Zhang Yingwen, Zhang Lin, Zhang Guohui, Zhang Juping, Zhang Huiguo, Zhang Zhaorong, Chen Dapeng, Chen Dafen, Chen Guangzhi, Chen Dejing, Gou Yanyun, Fan YuanLin Zuoming, Ouyang Cheng, Zhou Yongkang, Zhou Weilian, Zebazu (Tibetan), Meng Junxiu, Zhao Ping, Zhao Zongzheng (Bai), Zhao Minguang, Hu Xianchun, Hu Huachao, Hu Min, Niu Xiaoming, Duan Weiyi, Fei Ziwen, Yao Zhongyi, He Xiaoping (Buyi), Yuan Jingkui, Suo Guantao (Tibetan), Xia Honghui, Yan Yuqing, Xu Songnan, Xu Jing, Gao Xianming, Tang Ning, Tan Tingfeng, Tao Wuxian, Tao Xihui, Huang Yongguang, Huang Xuejiu, Huang Xuemei, Huang Yinkui, Huang Jinhua, Cao Qingze, Liang Dabi, Liang Derong, Ge Liaoyuan, Jiang Shizhong (Hui), Shu Weishuang, Pu Tianying (Yi), Zeng Xiaoping, Zeng Xianlin, Xie Tiangang, Xie Shijie, Xie Mingdao, Lan Xinguo, Pei Juan, Zhai Wenrong, Fan Shiying, Teng Yuhe, Teng Caiyuan, Heng Yufang	151	
2003	10th	Yu Wei, Tuden Nima (Tibetan), Ma Li (female, Qiang), Ma Zonghui (female, Hui), Wang Tianxi (Yi), Wang Ping, Wang Ning, Wang Hua, Wang Jin, Wang Yingfan, Wang Guochun, Wang Shiwen (female, Tibetan), Wang Rongxuan, Wang Hongzhang, Wang Xinqiong (female), Muji Yibu (Yi), Mao Lanzhen (female, Yi), Fang Xiaofang, Deng Xinmin, Gan Daoming, Shi Bi, Lu Renjiang, Jiadeng Luorong Xiangba (Tibetan), Tian Jiwan, Tian Weizhao (Tujia), Yao Sidan (Tibetan), Qumu Shiha (Yi), Zhu Kaiyou, Zhu Changlin, Ren Zhenglong, Ren Dejian, Liu Shanzai, Liu Jin, Liu Yingming, Liu Canglong, Liu Xiaofeng, Liu Jie, Liu Zhen, Qi Wenchao, Jiang Shanming, Sun Chuanmin, Sun Chun, Sun Yanfang, Sun Hongbo (female), Mou Xuheng (Tujia), Ji Jinshan, Du Guanghui, Du Jiang, Li Weiguo (Qiang), Li Lemin, Li Xiangzhi, Li Yanghui (female), Li Chuncheng, Li Jiashun, Li Jikai, Yang Likang, Yang Chengxue (Yi), Yang Zhiwen, Yang Quanming, Yang Jie (female, Yi), Yang Min (female), Yang Lu, Xiao Tianren, Xiao Helian (female), Wu Yinyi, Wu Quanyi, Wu Ailing (female), Wu Xinchun (female), He Chengli, He Mingfen (female), He Qiongying (female), Yu Daquan, Yu Bin, Yu Xinmin, Zou Guangyan, Leng Rong, Wang Zhengfang (female), Wang Junlin, Shen Guojun, Song Yuhua (female), Zhang Zhongwei, Zhang Dongsheng (Tibetan), Zhang Ning (Yi), Zhang Ruquan, Zhang Xuezhong, Zhang Jianfei, Zhang Chongming, Zhang Zhaorong, Chen Wenguang, Chen Wenqing, Chen Zhikun (female)Chen Fang, Chen Xiaoci, Chen Zhilin, Lin Hong (female, Tibetan), Yi Minli, Luo Linshu, Luo Zezhong, Luo Chunmei (female, Yi), Zhou Yongkang, Zhou Ping (female), Zhou Xiaoyan (female), Zheng Shunmin, Zebazu (Tibetan), Hu Huachao, Hu Deping, Ke Zunping, Niu Xiaoming (female), Duan Weiyi, Hou Zerou (female), Jiang Yuekai, Zhu Peter, Qin Yizhi, Nie Ronggui, Xia Honghui, Xia Chaojia, Ni Wenyuan, Xu Shiqun, Weng Weixiang, Gao Jun (female) (Tibetan), Gao Xianming, Guo Yongxiang, Xi Yifang, Tang Yueming (female), Tang Yanzi (female), Huang Xiaoxiang, Huang Mingquan, Huang Xuejiu, Huang Yanrong (female), Huang Yinkui, Cui Fuhua (female), Jiang Jufeng, Cheng Jiahua, Fu Zhikang, Fu Yonglin, Tong Ruochun (female), Xie Shijie, Xie Bing (female), Xie Mingdao, Yan Liangzhong, Lan Xinguo, Galacha (female, Tibetan), Xiong Guanglin, Xiong Fangqiu (female), Pan Minzhi, Dai Hong (female), Wei Fusheng	147	
2008	11th	Ma Yuanzhu, Ma Hua (Tibetan), Ma Zonghui (female, Hui), Wang Ji, Wang Zhengrong, Wang Dongzhou, Wang Zaiyin, Wang Hua, Wang Yukun, Wang Zuoming (Hui), Wang Huaichen, Wang Jin, Wang Mingrong (female, Miao), Wang Mingwen (female, Yi), Wang Shiwen (female, Tibetan), Wang Jianjun, Wang Pinsheng, Wang Hailin, Wang Minghui, Wang Lin (female), Wang Yu, Wang Qi (female), Mao Jinfang (female, Yi), Deng Chuan, Gan Daoming, Zuo Wanjun, Jiadeng Luorong Xiangba (Tibetan), Bai Yun (Yi), Tong Jie, Zhu Yizhuang, Qiao Tianming, Ren Zhenglong, Liu Yushun, Liu Chengming, Liu Shoupei, Liu Jin, Liu Bozhong, Liu Canglong, Liu Qibao, Liu Xiaoguang (female), Liu Xiaohua, Qi Wenchao, Jiang Shanming, Sun Chuanmin, Sun Chun, Hua Xin, Yan Junbo, Li Changchun, Li Weiguo (Qiang), Li Yaping, Li Changping (Tibetan), Li Mingchang, Li Jianhua, Li Chuncheng, Li Zhuo, Li Xiaohua (female), Li Jiaming, Li Jing (female), Yang Bangjie, Yang Xingping, Yang Zhiwen, Yang Xiuying (female, Yi), Yang Hongbo, Yang Juan (female), Yang Mei (female), Yang Cuifang (female), Xiao Helian (female), Wu Guanglai, Wu Zegang (Tibetan), Wu Xiaohua, Wu Xinchun (female), He Yehui (female), Yu Zisu, Leng Gang, Wang Junlin, Shen Guangming, Song Lianghua (female), Zhang Zhitie (Yi), Zhang Zhongwei, Zhang Zhenggui, Zhang Ning, Zhang Zuoha (Yi), Zhang Yudong, Zhang Guofu, Zhang Xuezhong, Zhang Shuping, Zhang Chongming, Zhang Beibei (female, Yi), Alai (Tibetan), Chen Wuyi (Tujia), Chen Wenhua, Chen Jiagui, Chen Zhilin, Wu Bin (female), Yingcuo (female, Tibetan), Lin Hong (female, Tibetan), Yi MinliLuo Chunmei (female, Yi ethnicity), Luo Qiang, Luo Qinhong, Luo Yiping, Shi Jun, Zhou Yuan, Zheng Xiaoxing, Zhao Lingying (female), Hu Changsheng, Hu Shuxiang, Ke Zunhong, Hou Yiping, Hou Yibin, Hou Xiongfei, Hou Rong (female), Jiang Xiaoting, Luo Longsen, Mo Wenxiu (female), Xia Ji'en, Xu Xuemin, Gao Xianhai, Guo Yongxiang, Guo Hongmei (female), Xi Yifang, Tang Limin, Tang Qiao, Tang Yanzi (female), Tu Wentao, Huang Xiaoxiang, Huang Shunfu, Huang Yanrong (female), Huang Jinsheng, Cao Jiafu, Cui Fuhua (female), Kang Yongheng, Liang Xiyang, Liang Huixing, Peng Xianjue, Peng Yu, Ge Honglin, Jiang Jufeng, Han Zhongxin, Fu Yonglin, Tong Ruochun (female), Xie Kaihua, Xie Tianyou, Xie Bing (female), Lei Hongjin, Liao Jikang, Wei Hong, Wei Qin (female)	148	
2013	12th	Yu Wei, Wang Yihong, Wang Shaoxiong, Wang ~~Dongming~~, Wang Dongzhou, Wang Ning, Wang Anlan (female, Qiang), Wang Jin, Wang Mingrong (female, Miao), Wang Mingwen (female, Yi), Wang Xiaozhou, Wang Hailin, Wang Haiping (female), Wang Fei, Wang Bin, Wang Minghui, Wang Qi (female), Deng Chuan, Deng Quanzhong, Gan ~~Daoming~~, Zuo Wanjun, Shi Minjia (female), Shi Ke, Jiadeng Luorong Xiangba (Tibetan), Bao Hui (female), Cheng Su, Ren Yongchang, Yang Xie (female), Xiang Dong, Liu Yushun, Liu Yonghao, Liu Shoupei, Liu Qibao, Liu Gexin, Liu Jie, Liu Daoping, Liu Qiang, Jiang Shanming, Xu Jiannan (female), Sun Chuanmin, Sun Ming (female), ~~Sun Zhentian~~, Su Zelin, Li Guangyuan, Li ~~Yi~~, Li Xu (female, Yi), Li Xiaohua (female), Li Jiaming, Li Jia (female), Yang Bang Jie, Yang Songbai, Yang Jiapeng (female), Xiao Fenghe, Wu Yinglu, Wu Zegang (Tibetan), Wu Xinchun (female), ~~He Huazhang~~, He Xuebin (female), He Junming, He Jian, Yu Kaiyuan, Wang Qide, Song Lianghua (female), Song Chaohua, Zhang Zhenggui, Zhang Dongsheng (Tibetan), Zhang Kejian, Zhang Zuoha (Yi), Zhang Yudong, Zhang Guofu, Zhang Shuping, Zhang Yan, Zhang Chonghe, Zhang Deming, Alai (Tibetan), Chen Wenhua, Chen Yueliang, Chen Zhilin, Chen Xinyou, Chen Yan (female), Yingcuo (female, Tibetan), Lin Shucheng, Lin Hong (female, Tibetan), Yi Jiaxiang, Luo Chunmei (female, Yi), Luo Yan (female), Luo Liangqing (Yi), ~~Luo Qinhong~~, Luo Xia (female), Jin Gang, Zhou Xiaoqiang, Zhou Xi'an, Zheng Xiaoxing, Zhao Xiangge, Zhao Yong, Zhao Aiwu (female), Zhao Ping(Female), Ke Zunhong, Liu Binjie, Zhong Mian, Zhong Qinjian, Hou Yiping, Hou Yibin, Hou Xiaochun, Hou Rong (female), Hong Jiansheng, Yao Yixian, Luo Yunlian (female, Yi), Qin Furong, Geng Funeng, Mo Wenxiu (female), ~~Li Dongsheng~~, Xu Jin, Xu Jianqun (female), ~~Gao Xianhai~~, Gao Xiang, Guo Hongmei (female), Tang Li, Tang Limin, Tang Qiao, Tang Qunrong (female), Yixi Dawa (Tibetan), Tu Wentao, Huang Guangwei, Huang ~~Shunfu~~, Huang Yanrong (female), Huang Runqiu, Huang Xinchu, Kang Yongheng, Peng Lin, Peng Yu, Ge Honglin, Jiang Jufeng, Jiang Renfu, Jiang Fuyi, Cheng Bingqiang, Fu Yonglin, Zeng Shengquan, Xie Kaihua, Xie Heping, Pu Li (female), Lai Dafu, Jian Qin, Guan Aiguo, Fan Ping (female), Pan Chengying (female, Yi), ~~Wei Hong~~, Wei Qin (female)	148	
2018	13th	Wang Yang, Cao Jianming, Du Yubo, Danzhu Angben (Tibetan), Li Jiayang, Zhao Xiangeng, Jidi Maga (Yi), Xu Yanhao, Gao Hongwei, Zhang Ping, He Hong, Yu Huiwen (Manchu), Ma Hua (Tibetan), Wang Ning, Wang Zhao (female), ~~Wang Bo~~, Wang Ying (female), Wang Qi (female), Wang Yihong, Wang Fengchao, Wang Dongming, Wang Yonglan (female, Yi), Wang Quanxing, Wang Anlan (female, Qiang), Wang Shujiang, Wang Xiaomei (female), Wang Yanfei, Mao Zhenfang (female, Yi), Yin Li, Gan Huatian, Shi Yudong, Ye Zhuang, Jiadeng Luorong Xiangba (Tibetan), Feng Jian, Jike Shiwu (female, Yi), Yao Dezhong, Zhu Shihong, Zhu Hexin, Qiao Jinshuangmei (female, Yi), Ren Xiaochun, Liu Zhong, Liu Chao, Liu Qiang, Liu Hanyuan, Liu Ting'an, Liu Xuguang, Liu Shoumin, Liu Zuoming, Jiang Yong, Jiang Jicun (Tibetan), Xu Zhou, Xu Weilin, Su Gaerbu (Yi), Du ~~Ziping~~, Li Jun, Li Biao, Li Weimin, Li Shulin, Li Haiying, Li Shuguang, Yang Wei, Yang Keng, Yang Xianong, Yang Zili, Yang Xingping, Yang Kening (Tibetan), Yang Jiande, Yang Bangwu, Xiao Youcai (Tibetan), Wu Xu (female), Wu Xiaoyi (female), Wu Hongying (female), Wu Guihua (female), Wu Qungang, Li Zan, He Ping, He Min (female), He Xuebin (female), He Shuping, Yu Dong, Yu Bin (Yi), Yu Shaorong (female, Qiang), Zou Jin, Zou Zijing, Wang Qide, Zhang Tong, Zhang Weiren, Zhang Guofen (female), Lu Wenjun, Alai (Tibetan), Chen Lang (female), Chen Lin (female), Chen Wenhua,~~Chen Jiming~~Chen Guangzhi, Chen Zhangming~~Chen Xinyou~~Gou Xinglong, Fan Bo, Fan Ruiping, Yi Jiaxiang, Luo Qiang, Luo Xia (female), Luo Liangjuan (female), Luo Jiaming, Luo Chaoyun, Zhou Zhongrong, Zhou Xiaoqiang, Zheng Jianying (female), Zheng Xiaoxing, Zong Yongxiang, Jiang Chu (Tibetan), Zhao Yong, Zhao Ping (female), Zhao Hui, Zhao Dachun, Zhao Sixue (female), Cha Yuchun (female), Hou Rong (female), Jiang Ximeng, He Guangyu (female), Geng Xincui (female), Geng Funeng, Xu Ping (female), Xu Jiuping, Guo Hengxiao, Tang Yan (female), Tang Chuanping, Tao Xunhua (female), Huang Bo, Huang Yi, Huang Xiaojun, Cui Peng, Cui Xingguo, Fu Yuhang (female), Tuo Qingming, Liang Yijian, Peng Chuanxin, Jiang Xiaosong, Jiang Weiping (Bai), Jiang Liying (female), Cheng Bingqiang, Zeng Na (female), Zeng Qing, Xin Jiadanzhen (Tibetan), Cai Guangjie (female), Wei Qin (female), Wei Xuefeng .	148	
2023	14th	Zhao Leji, Li Ji, Song Rui, Tian Xuejun, Du Hangwei, Du Jiang, Xi Zhengping, Zhong Zhihua, Liu Zhenfang, Zhang Xingmin, Zheng Gongcheng, Ma Kui, Ma Guibang, Wang Fengchao, Wang Ning, Wang Yonglan, Wang Li, Wang Lin, Wang Cheng, Wang Shujiang, Wang Shuming, Wang Xiaohui, Wang Xiaomei, Wang Haifeng, Wang Ying, Wang Yanfei, Wang Qi, Wen Shaomu, Deng Longjiang, Lu Jun, Jiadeng Luorongxiangba, Shi Hongping, Bao Hui, Feng Fagui, Feng Yuan, Jilie Ziri, Yao Dezhong, Lü Zuyan, Zhu Yongfan, Qiao Jinshuangmei, Ren Min, Liu Cangli, Liu Hanyuan, Liu Chengan, Liu Guangqiang, Liu Tingan, Liu Chuanjian, Liu Huiying, Liu Zhong, Liu Zheng Liu Yanying, Liu Suying, Jiang Jicun, Xu Qiang, Yan Weidong, Yan Baoyu, Li Yun, Li Yunze, Li Dan, Li Yumei, Li Shiliang, Li Jun, Li Jie, Li Shulin, Li Xueping, Li Hui, Yang Xinping, Yang Zhenglin, Yang Xingping, Yang Wuyun, Yang Juan, Wu Zhongyue, Wu Hao, Wu Qungang, Wu De, Li Zan, He Yanzheng, Yu Xianhe, Yu Xiaoqi, Yu Shaorong, Yu Dechun, Zou Ming, Wang Qide, Zhang Yong, Zhang Zutao, Zhang Daoping, Ashilabi, Chen Shuping, Chen Guanghao, Chen Zhangming, Chen Bairong, Gou Xinglong, Ouyang Mei, Shang Liping, Luo Xiangang, Luo Chunmei, Luo Zhenhua, Luo Qiang, Zheng Bei, Zheng Wangchun, Zheng ZhexuanZhao Bo, Hu Xiaoling, Liu Jiang, Zhong Bo, Zhong Chenglin, Hou Rong, Shi Xiaolin, Jiang Tao, Geng Funeng, Geshe Wangmu, Yan Luzuo, Xu Zhiwen, Gao Pengling, Tang Chengfeng, Tang Anbin, Tang Lijun, Tao Xunhua, Huang He, Huang Yi, Cao Tianlan, Tuo Qingming, Liang Wei, Peng Chuanxin, Peng Yingmei, Peng Qinghua, Ge Xiaoyan, Dong Weimin, Dong Wei, Dong Li, Han Xiaojun, Yu Yu, Shi Yongshou, Zeng Congqin, Zeng Hongyang, Zeng Na, Zeng Daoqun, Meng Yuan, Yu Ping, Xin Jiadanzhen, Liao Wenbin, Liao Jianyu, Zhai Gang, Dai Xuebin, Wei Yanyu, Wei Qin	147	
