= 1903 in China =

- Decades: 1880s; 1890s; 1900s; 1910s; 1920s
- See also: Other events of 1903; History of China • Timeline • Years

The following lists events that happened during 1903 in China.

== Incumbents ==
- Guangxu Emperor (29th year)

=== Viceroys ===
- Viceroy of Zhili — Yuan Shikai
- Viceroy of Min-Zhe — Xu Yingkui then Xiliang then Li Xingrui
- Viceroy of Huguang — Duanfang
- Viceroy of Shaan-Gan — Songfan
- Viceroy of Liangguang — Deshou then Cen Chunxuan
- Viceroy of Yun-Gui — Ding Zhenduo
- Viceroy of Sichuan — Cen Chunxuan then Xiliang
- Viceroy of Liangjiang — Wei Guangtao

== examination ==
- Zhuangyuan: Wang Shoupeng

== Events ==
=== May ===
- Zhang Shizhao was hired as the chief editor of the Su Bao

=== July ===
- July 1 - Shanghai Municipal Police transferred six people, including Zhang Binglin, to the public for review. (zh:蘇報案)
- July 14 - the Dongqing Railway was opened to traffic.
- July 15 - the first public hearing. (zh:蘇報案)
- July 21 - The second public hearing was held, but due to the Qing court was busy with extradition, so the plaintiff’s lawyer requested a rescheduling at the beginning of the trial. (zh:蘇報案)

=== August ===
- August 13 - Tsar Nicolas II appointed Alexeyev as viceroy in charge of all civil and military authority over Russian possessions in the Far East, including Russian-occupied Manchuria, the Liaodong Peninsula, and Russia Amur Military District (present day Primorsky Krai).

=== December ===
- December 3 - The trial was officially held for a total of four days. (zh:蘇報案)

== Births ==
- October 10 - Bei Shizhang, Chinese biologist. (d. 2009)
- October 21 - K. C. Wu, Chinese political figure and historian. (d. 1984)
- November 4 - Watchman Nee, Chinese church leader and Christian teacher. (d. 1972)
- December 28 – Tang Yunsheng, opera singer in Peking. (d. 1971)
- Gan Siqi
- Lu Kanru
- Hua Gang
- Li Shuoxun
- Chen Geng

== Deaths ==
- Zhu Shaowen
- April 11 - Ronglu was a Manchu political and military leader of the late Qing dynasty. (born in April 1836)
- Zhang Peilun
