= 1975 in China =

- Decades: 1950s; 1960s; 1970s; 1980s; 1990s
- See also: Other events of 1975; History of China • Timeline • Years

Events in the year 1975 in the People's Republic of China.

== Incumbents ==
- Paramount leader — Mao Zedong
- Chairman of the Chinese Communist Party — Mao Zedong
- Premier of the People's Republic of China — Zhou Enlai
- Chairman of the Standing Committee of the National People's Congress — Zhu De
- Chairman of the Chinese People's Political Consultative Conference — Zhou Enlai

=== Governors ===
- Governor of Anhui Province – Song Peizhang
- Governor of Fujian Province – Liao Zhigao
- Governor of Gansu Province – Xian Henghan
- Governor of Guangdong Province – Zhao Ziyang → Wei Guoqing
- Governor of Guizhou Province – Lu Ruilin
- Governor of Hebei Province – Liu Zihou
- Governor of Heilongjiang Province – Liu Guangtao
- Governor of Henan Province – Liu Jianxun
- Governor of Hubei Province – Zhao Xinchu
- Governor of Hunan Province – Hua Guofeng
- Governor of Jiangsu Province – Peng Chong
- Governor of Jiangxi Province – Jiang Weiqing
- Governor of Jilin Province – Wang Huaixiang
- Governor of Liaoning Province – Zeng Shaoshan
- Governor of Qinghai Province – Liu Xianquan
- Governor of Shaanxi Province – Li Ruishan
- Governor of Shandong Province – Bai Rubing
- Governor of Shanxi Province – Xie Zhenhua → Wang Qian
- Governor of Sichuan Province – Liu Xingyuan → Zhao Ziyang
- Governor of Yunnan Province – Zhou Xing → Jia Qiyun
- Governor of Zhejiang Province – Tan Qilong

== Events ==
- January 5 — Mao Zedong propose Deng Xiaoping as Vice Chairman of the Central Military Commission and Chief of the General Staff of the PLA.
- January 9 — Li Fuchun, Vice Premier of China, dies at 75.
- January 13–17 — The first session of the 4th National People's Congress was opened. The office of the President of China, Vice President of China and Procurator-General of the Supreme People's Procuratorate were abolished.
- January 17 — The second constitution of the People's Republic of China is adopted, replacing the 1954 constitution.
- February 4 — An earthquake hit the city of Haicheng in Liaoning Province at 19:36 CST.
- April 2 — Dong Biwu, acting President of China, dies at 89.
- April 5 — Chiang Kai-shek, the last leader who ruled the Republic of China in the Mainland from 1928 to 1949 and the island of Taiwan from 1949 to 1975, dies in Taipei, Taiwan at the age of 88.
- July 5 — The Baoji–Chengdu railway was electrified.
- August 8 — The Banqiao Dam in China's Henan Province, fails after Typhoon Nina; over 200,000 people perish.
- November 26 — The Counterattack the Right-Deviationist Reversal-of-Verdicts Trend was launched against Vice Premier Deng Xiaoping's anti Cultural Revolution program.
- December 16 — Kang Sheng, the Vice Chairman of the Chinese Communist Party, dies at 77.

== Deaths ==
- January 9 — Li Fuchun, Vice Premier of China (b. 1900)
- March 2 — Rao Shushi, politician (b. 1903)
- April 2 — Dong Biwu, acting President of China (b. 1886)
- April 5 — Chiang Kai-shek, nationalist leader who led Mainland China from 1928 to 1949 and Taiwan from 1949 to 1975 (b. 1887)
- May 26 — Kurban Tulum, Uyghur farmer and electrician, promoted as a symbol of unity between the Uyghurs and Han Chinese (b. 1883)
- July 31 — Ma Bufang, prominent Chinese Muslim warlord of the Ma clique (b. 1903)
- December 16 — Kang Sheng, Vice Chairman of the Chinese Communist Party (b. 1898)
