= Minzhe =

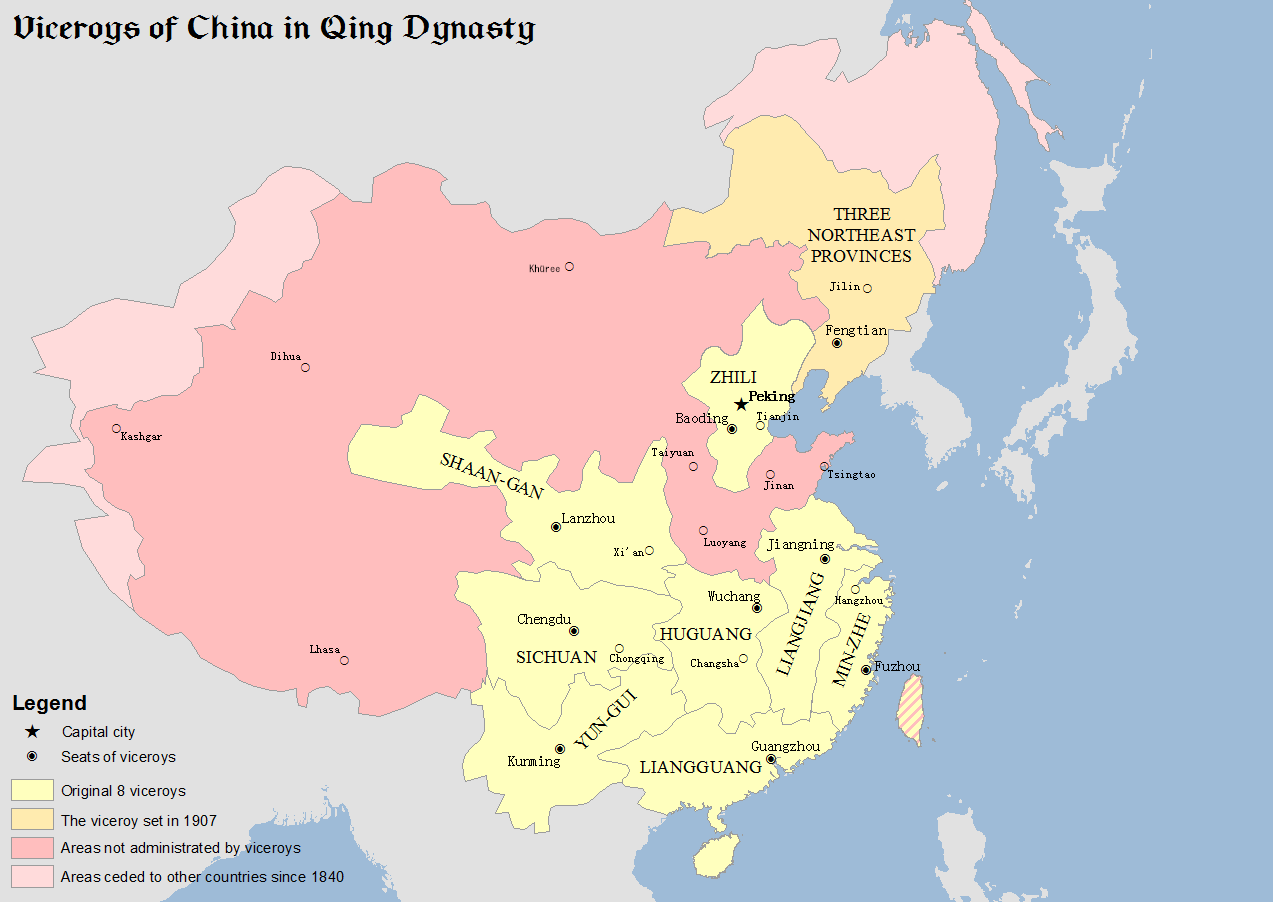
Min-Zhe is located in Southeastern China and consisted of Min (Fujian and Taiwan) and Zhe (Zhejiang).

Minzhe (Chinese: 閩浙) was a geographic and political area of the Qing dynasty in southeastern China. It included the modern-day areas of Fujian, Taiwan, and Zhejiang. The Governor of Minzhe was known as the viceroy of Minzhe in the English language. Its administrative centre was located in Fuzhou.
