= Feng Yuanjun =

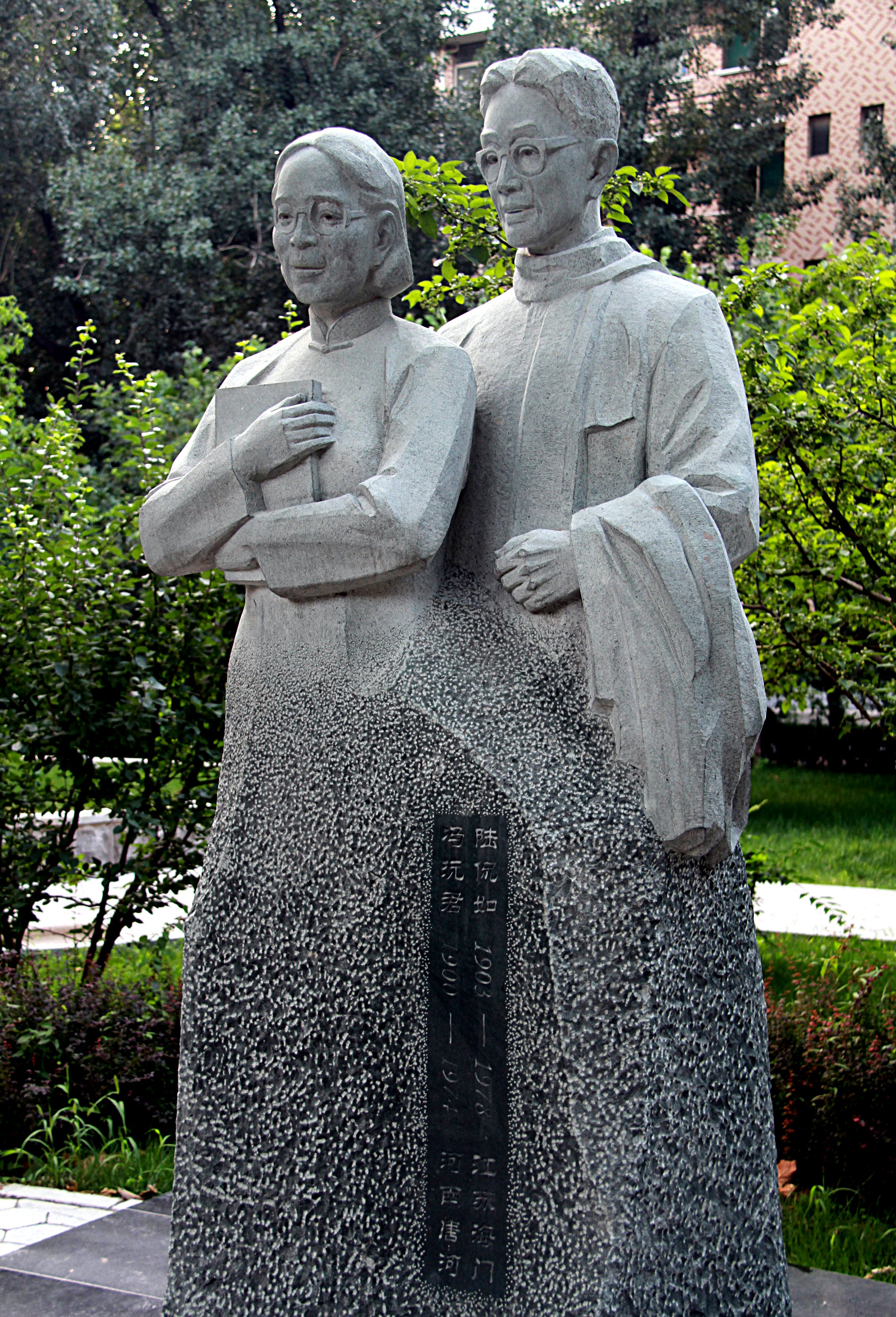
Statue of Feng Yuanjun and her husband Lu Kanru on the Central Campus of Shandong University

Feng Yuanjun (Chinese: 冯沅君, September 4, 1900 – June 17, 1974) was a writer and scholar of Chinese classical literature and literary history. She was married to fellow literary scholar Lu Kanru with whom she coauthored several literary works.

Feng Yuanjun was the younger sister of philosopher Feng Youlan and the aunt of writer Zong Pu (Feng Youlan's daughter).

== Life ==
Feng Yuanjun was born into a family of wealthy literati.

She was educated at the Women's Higher Normal School in Beijing from 1917 to 1922 and participated in the May Fourth Movement during this time. After her graduation from the Women's School, she entered Peking University as a graduate student of classical Chinese literature. She graduated from Peking University with an M.A. degree in 1925.

After that, she held teaching appointments at Jinling University in Nanjing and Zhongfa University in Beijing. In 1930, she was appointed as one of the first female professors at Peking University. From 1932 to 1935, she worked on a doctoral thesis on classical Chinese literature at the Universite de Paris in France. During the Second Sino-Japanese War, Feng Yuanjun and her husband Lu Kanru lived and worked in various locations in southern and south-western China. After the war, she returned with Dongbei University to Shenyang. In 1946, she joined Shandong University, then located in Qingdao, and later moved with the university to Jinan. She held her appointment with Shandong University until the end of her career and eventually served as a vice principal of the university. During the Cultural Revolution, she was prosecuted as a "reactionary scholar".

She died of colon cancer in 1974, before the end of the Cultural Revolution.
