= Suchang =

Qing dynasty official

Suchang (蘇昌; died 1768) was a Qing dynasty official of the Irgen Gioro clan and a member of the Plain Blue Banner. He held senior offices including Governor of Guangdong, Viceroy of Huguang, Viceroy of Liangguang, Viceroy of Min-Zhe, and acting Minister of Works.

== Biography ==
A grandson of the Banner commander Mampi, Suchang entered official service during the reign of the Kangxi Emperor and was promoted through censorial and administrative ranks. During the Qianlong era, he became known for his work in provincial administration, land-reclamation policies, and anti-corruption efforts. As Viceroy of Liangguang, he investigated major judicial cases and exposed wrongful convictions; the Qianlong Emperor commended him, and he was granted the honorary title of Taizi Taibao (太子太保, "Grand Protector of Crown Prince"). In 1764 he was transferred to the post of Governor-General of Min-Zhe and, in the following year, directed the suppression of an Indigenous uprising in Tamsui, Taiwan. Suchang died in 1768 while in Beijing and was posthumously granted the honorary name Keqin (恪勤, "Conscientious and Diligent").

His younger brother Mingshan (明山) and son Fugang (富綱) both later served as viceroys.
