= Li Shuaitai =

Li Shuaitai 李率泰
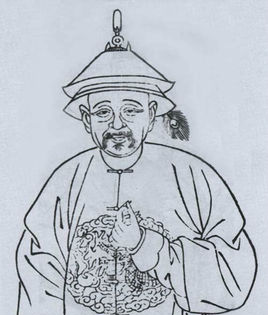

Grand Secretary of the Palace Academy for the Advancement of Literature
- In office 1651

Viceroy of Liangguang
- In office 12 July 1653 – 16 March 1656
- Preceded by: Tong Yangjia
- Succeeded by: Wang Guoguang

Viceroy of Min-Zhe
- In office 1656–1658
- Preceded by: Tuntai
- Succeeded by: Zhao Guozuo

Viceroy of Fujian
- In office 1658–1664
- Preceded by: Himself (As Viceroy of Minzhe)
- Succeeded by: Zhu Changzuo

Personal details
- Born: Li Yanling (李延齡); Unknown
- Died: 1666
- Parent: Li Yongfang (father)

Military service
- Allegiance: Qing Empire
- Branch/service: Han Chinese Plain Blue Banner
- Battles/wars: Transition from Ming to Qing

Li Shuaitai (Chinese: 李率泰; d. 1666), originally named Li Yanling (李延齡), courtesy names Shouchou (壽疇) and Shuda (叔達), posthumous name Zhongxiang (忠襄), was a military commander and official of China's Qing dynasty. He served as the Viceroy of Liangguang between 1653 and 1656, then as the Viceroy of Min-Zhe from 1656 to its partition in 1658, after which he continued as Viceroy of Fujian until 1664.

His father, Li Yongfang, was a Ming general who defected to the Qing.

Government offices
Preceded by (Vacant)	Viceroy of Liangguang; 1653–1656	Succeeded by Wang Guoguang
Preceded by Tuntai	Viceroy of Min-Zhe; 1656–1658	Succeeded by (Partitioned)
Preceded by Himself (As Viceroy of Minzhe)	Viceroy of Fujian; 1658–1664	Succeeded by Zhu Changzuo
