= 1901 in China =

- Decades: 1880s; 1890s; 1900s; 1910s; 1920s
- See also: Other events of 1901; History of China • Timeline • Years

The following lists events that happened during 1901 in the Empire of the Great Qing.

== Incumbents ==
- Guangxu Emperor (22nd year)

== Events ==
- August - Eight-legged essay in imperial examinations is abolished
- September 7 - Boxer Protocol

== Births ==
- April 13 - Zhao Shiyan, Communist revolutionary
- August 26 - Chen Yi, general and politician
- November 6 - Yang Kaihui, wife of Mao Zedong

== Deaths ==
- November 7 - Li Hongzhang
