= Yingze Park =

Park in Taiyuan, Shanxi, China

Coordinates: 37°51′18″N 112°33′44″E

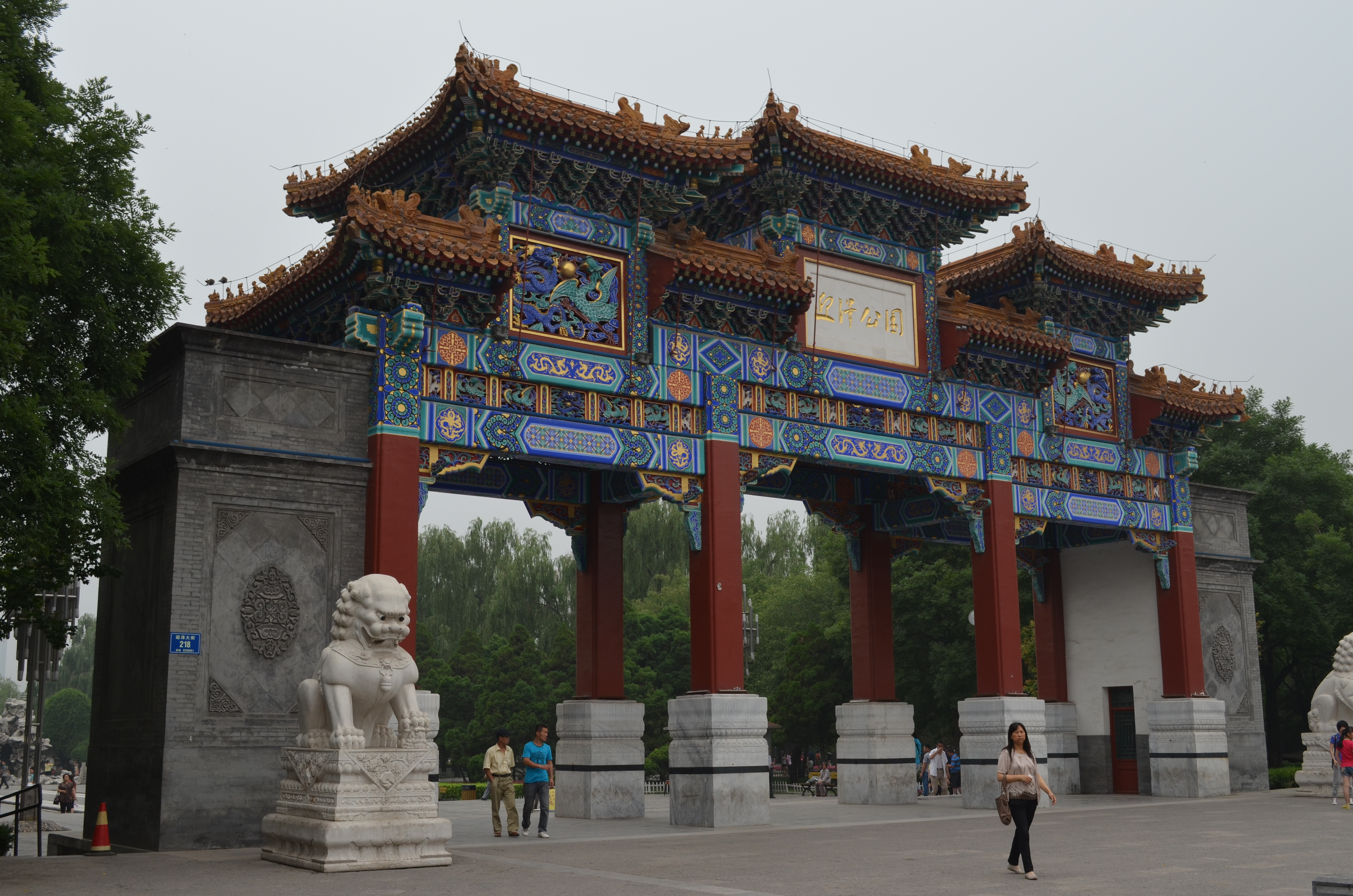
Yingze Park

Yingze Park is located in downtown Taiyuan, Shanxi, China. It was opened to the public on June 1, 1957 and covers 63.28 hectares including its lake. It has over 390,000 ornamental plants in more than 10 gardens. Near the east gate is the Jin Merchant Museum, in the style of an ancient guild hall. In the park's center is the Cangjing Building, an 800-year-old structure transported from the Dongda Temple in Taigu. The north gate of the park features an ornate archway called "Beauty of Taiyuan" based on the style of the Yonghe Lama Temple in Beijing. The park also has recreational boating, arcade games, and children's playgrounds.
