= Liu Dagang (chemist) =

Chinese chemist (1904–1991)

Liu Dagang (Chinese: 柳大纲; February 8, 1904 – September 14, 1991) was a Chinese chemist, who was a member of the Chinese Academy of Sciences.
