= Mo Wuping =

Chinese composer (1958–1993)

Mo Wuping (Chinese: 莫五平; pinyin: Mò Wǔpíng; 5 September 1958, Hengyang, Hunan – 2 June 1993, Beijing) was a Chinese contemporary classical composer. He entered the Central Conservatory of Music in Beijing to study composition with Luo Zhongrong in 1983. In 1990 he went to France and study with Yoshihisa Taira in École Normale de Musique de Paris. He became a member of SACEM in 1992. He died in Beijing in 1993.

Mo's son Mo Mo is a cellist.
