= SIUI =

- Type: Limited
- Industry: Medical Devices/NDT instruments/Medical and NDT probes/Wedge
- Founded: Shantou, China (1978)
- Headquarters: Shantou, China
- Key people: Li Delai, President
- Products: ultrasound imaging systems, medical X-Ray imaging products, non-destructive testing instruments.
- Number of employees: 500-1000
- Website: SIUI.com

Shantou Institute of Ultrasonic Instruments Co., Ltd (SIUI) is China's biggest manufacturing base of ultrasound with longest history. SIUI goes through a technology development of A-B-C-D-E. Each step has driven the industry progress in China. A: A mode ultrasound equipment. B:B mode ultrasound imaging equipment. C:Color Doppler. In 1997, SIUI manufactured its first color Doppler system Apogee 800.D:Real-time 3D/4D ultrasound. In 2008, SIUI developed the real-time 3D/4D technology, and released a series of real-time 3D/ 4D color Doppler systems. E: Elastography.

SIUI develops and manufactures a variety of ultrasound imaging systems and accessories for both human and veterinary use, and NDT equipment including phased-array ultrasonic flaw detector, conventional flaw detector, thickness gauge, probes and accessories. The company is currently organized into three product category divisions: ultrasound imaging systems, medical X-Ray imaging products, and non-destructive testing instruments. SIUI has been certified by ISO9001 Certification, European CE Marking and the U.S. Food and Drug Administration (FDA).

In addition to its facilities in and around Shantou, SIUI maintains more 20 offices around China and around the world.

The Ultrasound Imaging Systems division develops and manufactures a complex medical ultrasound imaging solution including B/W, color Doppler, volume 4D imaging & veterinary ultrasound products.

The Non Destructive Testing Products division provides phased-array ultrasonic flaw detector, conventional flaw detector, thickness gauge, probes and accessories serving in machinery, metallurgy, railway, shipbuilding, aircraft and building. SIUI is the member of the following professional societies: American Society for Nondestructive Testing, The Chinese Society of NDT, JSNDI and British Institute of Non-Destructive Testing.
