= 1898 in China =

- Decades: 1870s; 1880s; 1890s; 1900s; 1910s
- See also: Other events of 1898; History of China • Timeline • Years

Events from the year 1898 in China (戊戌).

== Incumbents ==
- Guangxu Emperor (24th year)

=== Viceroys ===
- Viceroy of Zhili — Wang Wenshao then Ronglu then Yuan Shikai then Yulu
- Viceroy of Min-Zhe — Bian Baoquan then Xu Yingkui
- Viceroy of Huguang — Zhang Zhidong
- Viceroy of Shaan-Gan — Tao Mo
- Viceroy of Liangguang — Tan Zhonglin
- Viceroy of Yun-Gui — Songfan
- Viceroy of Sichuan — Yulu then Kuijun
- Viceroy of Liangjiang — Liu Kunyi

== Events ==
- March 9 Kiautschou Bay concession leasing Qingdao to German Empire "on 6 March 1898 the German Empire retreated from outright cession of the area and accepted a leasehold of the bay for 99 years, or until 1997"
- March 27 Convention for the Lease of the Liaotung Peninsula or Pavlov Agreement for Russian Dalian
- May 29 Lease of Guangzhouwan to France
- June 9 - Convention between England and China Respecting an Extension of Hong Kong Territory, the New Territories leased to England for 99 years
- June 11-September 21 - Hundred Days' Reform
- June 11, Emperor Guangxu promulgated the decree of Clear Instructions for Important Affairs of State
- July 1 Lease of Weihaiwei under British rule
- Imperial University of Peking (now Peking University) founded

== Births ==
- March 5 - Zhou Enlai
- May - Wang Zuo
- June - Zhang Tailei
- October - Yuan Wencai
- October 24 - Peng Dehuai
- November 24 - Liu Shaoqi
- Tong Linge

== Deaths ==
- September 28 - Tan Sitong, Lin Xu, Kang Guangren (brother of Kang Youwei), Yang Shenxiu, Yang Rui (reformer) and Liu Guangdi
