= Battle of Senluo Temple =

1899 battle of the Boxer Rebellion

- Part of Boxer Rebellion
Date	October 18, 1899
Location	Senluo Temple in Pingyuan County, Shandong, China
Result	Qing victory

Belligerents
Boxer movement	Qing dynasty

Strength
1,000 – 1,500 rebels	3,950 – 4,690 soldiers

Casualties and losses
27+ killed	Light

The Battle of Senluo Temple was a clash between members of the "Militia United in Righteousness" (simplified Chinese: 义和团; traditional Chinese: 義和團; pinyin: Yìhètuán; better known as the "Boxers") and Qing government troops that took place on October 18, 1899, near a temple located on the western edge of Pingyuan County in northwestern Shandong. The Boxers were armed with swords, spears and a few hunting rifles. In a first skirmish they inflicted a few casualties on Qing troops and forced them to retreat, but the Qing army won the battle in a counterattack during which at least 27 Boxers were killed. After the Shandong authorities caught and executed the Boxer leaders in the following months, the Boxer movement died off in the immediate area, partly because local peasants could see that the Boxers' invulnerability rituals did not work. However, thanks to its non-centralized organization and driven by widespread support for its anti-Christian activities, the Boxer movement continued to spread quickly, culminating in the Boxer Rebellion that engulfed northern China in the spring and summer of 1900.

The Battle of Senluo Temple was a "watershed" in the history of the Boxer movement and marked its "final maturation." For the first time, the Boxers called themselves the "Militia United in Righteousness" instead of "Boxers [or "Fists": 拳, pinyin: quán] United in Righteousness," hoping to use their new name to distance themselves from proscribed martial arts sects and to give themselves the legitimacy of a group that defended orthodoxy. The battle was also the first time the Boxers' slogan of "Support the Qing, destroy the foreign" (simplified Chinese: 扶清灭洋; traditional Chinese: 扶清滅洋; pinyin: fú Qīng miè yáng)--by which they announced their intention to support the reigning dynasty and get rid of foreign influence—gained prominence. Finally, the clash attracted the support of influential officials and Manchu princes at the imperial court, who started to see the Boxers as possible allies against the increased imperialist activities that had been triggered by the Juye Incident two years earlier.

== Bibliography ==
- Buck, David D. (1987), Recent Studies of the Boxer Movement, New York: M.E. Sharpe.
- Cohen, Paul (1997), History in Three Keys: The Boxers as Event, Experience, and Myth, New York: Columbia University Press, ISBN 0-231-10651-3.
- Elleman, Bruce A. (2001), Modern Warfare in China, 1795-1989, London and New York: Routledge, ISBN 0-415-21474-2.
- Esherick, Joseph W. (1987), The Origins of the Boxer Uprising, Berkeley and Los Angeles: University of California Press, ISBN 0-520-06459-3.
