= Sun Xiaocun =

Chinese politician

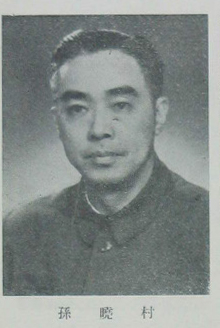
Sun Xiaocun

Sun Xiaocun (Chinese: 孙晓村; November 11, 1906 – May 4, 1991) was a Chinese male politician, who was the vice chairperson of the Chinese People's Political Consultative Conference.
