= Zhao Zongyu =

Chinese chemist

- 赵宗燠
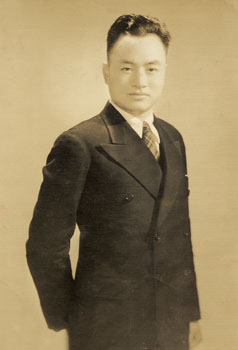
- Zhao Zongyu in 1935 in Shanghai
- Born: 28 November 1904; Rongchang County, Sichuan, Qing China
- Died: 10 October 1989 (aged 84); Beijing, China
- Education: National Central University; Technische Universität Berlin
- Spouse: Wang Yingming
- Scientific career
- Fields: Chemical engineering

Chinese name
- Simplified Chinese: 赵宗燠
- Traditional Chinese: 趙宗燠
Transcriptions
Standard Mandarin
- Hanyu Pinyin: Zhào Zōngyù

Zhao Zongyu (28 November 1904 – 10 October 1989) was a Chinese chemist and an academician of the Chinese Academy of Sciences. He has been hailed as "father of man-made oil in China".

== Biography ==
Zhao was born in Rongchang County (now belongs to Chongqing), Sichuan, on 28 November 1904, to Zhao Yunqu (赵云渠), a military officer and industrialist. After graduating from the Department of Chemistry, National Central University (now Nanjing University) in 1928, he stayed at the university and worked as assistant.

After the Mukden Incident, he participated in amateur military training classes and the Counter Japanese "Ten People's Regiment" (抗日十人团). In 1932, the January 28 incident broke out. He joined the student volunteer army and served as the captain of the 4th Brigade. He led 32 team members to deliver ammunition and food to front-line soldiers to support the 19th Route Army. The Empire of Japan's aggression made him realize that "science saves the country" and "industry saves the poor". He arrived in Germany in 1935 to begin his education at the Institute of Chemical and Process Engineering at the Technische Hochschule in Berlin.

He returned to China after graduation in 1939 and worked as factory manager of Beibei Synthetic Gasoline Plant (北碚合成汽油厂) in Chongqing.

At the beginning of 1946, he was ordered by the Resources Committee to lead several technicians to take part in the reception of the industrial legacy of the Japanese in the northeast China, where he served as director and chief engineer of Shenyang Chemical Plant (沈阳化工厂) in 1947. Soon after he was transferred to Tianjin and appointed general manager and chief engineer of Tianjin Chemical Industry Company (天津化学工业公司). He was chief engineer of Production Technology Department of Ministry of Petroleum Industry in 1955, and held that office until 1964. He was chief engineer of the Research Institute of Chemical Industry, Ministry of Petroleum Industry and the Research Institute of Chemical Industry of China Petrochemical Corporation since 1965. He joined the Communist Party in 1984.

On 10 October 1989, he died of illness in Beijing, aged 84.

He was a member of the 3rd National Committee of the Chinese People's Political Consultative Conference and a member of the 4th, 5th and 6th Standing Committee of the Chinese People's Political Consultative Conference.

== Personal life ==
He married Wang Yingming (王应明).

== Honours and awards ==
- 1957 Member of the Chinese Academy of Sciences (CAS)
