= Chen Tingru =

- Born: January 1914; Lianshui, Jiangsu, China
- Died: April 27, 2017 (aged 103); Suzhou, Jiangsu, China
- Military career
- Allegiance: China
- Branch: People's Liberation Army
- Service years: 1939–1981
- Conflicts: Second Sino-Japanese War Chinese Civil War: Huaihai Campaign
- Awards: 3rd Class Order of Liberation; 3rd Class Order of Independence and Freedom; Honor Merit Medal of Independence

Chen Tingru (Chinese: 陳廷儒; pinyin: Chén Tíngrú; January 1914 – 27 April 2017) was a Chinese veteran. During the 2015 China Victory Day Parade, he was well known for sitting in the first row of veterans as the most senior veteran present.

Chen was born in Lianshui, Jiangsu. He graduated from a normal school and became the principal of a primary school. During the Second Sino-Japanese War, his students scattered after the county was captured by the Imperial Japanese Army, forcing him to quit his position. Influenced by local guerrillas, Chen joined them in 1939. Based in northern Jiangsu province, he began spreading propaganda against the invaders and joined the Chinese Communist Party in 1942.

Later, Chen was promoted to a middle-ranking officer in charge of administrative and political work. He retired in 1981 and was invited to parade on Victory Day in 2015 as a surviving soldier.

Chen died on April 27, 2017, in Suzhou, Jiangsu.
