= Antelope Enterprise Holdings =

Chinese ceramic company

Antelope Enterprise Holdings Limited
- Formerly: China Ceramics Co., Ltd.
- Type: Public
- Traded as: Nasdaq: AEHL
- Industry: General Building Materials
- Founded: 1993; 33 years ago
- Headquarters: Jinjiang city, Fujian province, China
- Key people: Jia Dong Huang (CEO and director) (2012.12)
- Products: Fiber reinforced plastics and plastic composites
- Website: www.cceramics.com

Antelope Enterprise Holdings (formerly China Ceramics Co., Ltd.) was founded in 1993 and now based in Jinjiang city, Fujian province of China. China Ceramics involves in the market of ceramic tiles. These ceramic tiles are sold domestically and worldwide, used for exterior siding and interior flooring of residential and commercial buildings. The company engages in partnership with about 40 exclusive distributors domestically. It has 2 facilities in Jinjiang, Fujian Province and Gaoan, Jiangxi Province.

== History ==
1993.9, China Ceramics incorporated Hengda
1999, The company's products obtained certification of both ISO 9002 quality management system and product quality. In 2002.7, it received ISO 9001:2000 accreditation. In 2005.8, it received certification of GB/T24001-2004IDT ISO14000﹕2004 environment management system.
2007.3, the company joined "Drafting Committee of the Ceramic Industrial Standard Association".
2009.11, in order to become a company listed in US market, China Ceramics merged with China Holdings Acquisition Corp. Further, in 2010.10, China Ceramics acquired Gaoan facility.

In October 2020 the company changed its name from "China Ceramics Co., Ltd" to "Antelope Enterprise Holdings Limited".

== Products & Services ==
China Ceramics owns four famous band, namely Hengda (HD), Hengdeli (HDL), TOERTO, WULIQIAO and Pottery Capital of Tang Dynasty and largely six product categories, namely porcelain tiles, glazed tiles, glazed porcelain tiles, rustic tiles, ultra-thin tiles, and polished glazed tiles.

== Operations ==
=== Managerial Practices ===
- Jia Dong Huang Chief Executive Officer, Director
- Man Edmund Hen Chief Financial Officer
- Wei Feng Su General Legal Counsel, Corporate Secretary, Director
- Pei Zhi Su Sales Deputy General Manager, Director
- Paul K. Kelly Non-Executive Independent Chairman of the Board
- Yan Davis Cheng Independent Director
- Paul K. Kelly Independent Director
- Bill Stulginsky Audit Committee Chairman

On Nov 4, 2013, China Ceramics appointed Mr. Shen Cheng Liang as an independent member of the Company's Board of Directors, to replace Mr. Ding Wei Dong, who resigned from the Board of Directors for health reasons.

=== Research and development ===
The production process for ceramic tiles includes mainly six steps: inspecting, mixing and grinding preparation, spray drying, molding, glazing for pressed tiles, firing to add clay and minerals and finally packaging.

China Ceramics owns four utility model patents and eleven design patents (2012.12.31). Its R&D team engages in the environment sustainable products and has developed over 2,000 different outcomes, such as ultra thin, light weight tiles.

== Awards ==
China Ceramics’ products enjoy the reputation of many awards, such as “Asia's 500 Most Influential Brands of 2010” and “National Inspection-Free Product”.
The company was honored "China Ceramic Industry Famous Brand Product" and "China Building Ceramic Well-Known Brand" by China Building Ceramic Industry Association for two consecutive years of 2007 and 2008.
2006.3, The company was awarded the "Environmentally-Friendly Building Materials" by China building materials association.
