= Liu Chi-Sheng =

Chinese pilot (1914–1991)

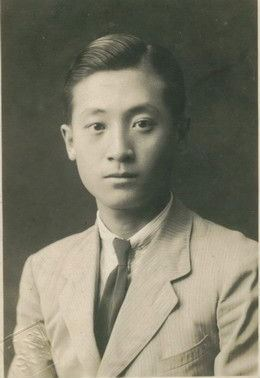
- Liu Chi-Sheng, 1930's

Personal details
- Born: 22 February 1914 Baoding, Hebei, Republic of China
- Died: February 18, 1991 (aged 76) Scarborough, Ontario, Canada

Liu Chi-Sheng, also known as Liu Zhesheng (22 February 1914 - 18 February 1991) was a Chinese pilot that fought in World War II, the Second Sino-Japanese War and the Chinese Civil War.

== Early life ==
Liu was born in 1914, in Baoding, which at the time was part of the Republic of China, modern day People's Republic of China.

== Military service ==
Since his father was a career officer, in 1931, Liu followed his footsteps when he entered the Central Officer Academy due to the Japanese invasion of Manchuria. In 1934 he changed to the Central Aviation School, and graduated from the fifth class on October 12 1936, with excellent records. He had his military formation at the Whampoa Military Academy.

At the start of the Second Sino-Japanese War, Liu Chi-Sheng was serving in the 21st PS of the 4th PG.

Liu Chi-Sheng has achieved 10 individual and 2 team victories.

== Life after the war ==
In 1963 he left the service with the rank of brigadier general. After his retirement, he settled in Taiwan.

== Last days and death ==
At the end of 1990, he visited his relatives in Canada, where he suffered a intracerebral hemorrhage as a result of which he died on February 18, 1991.

== Awards and decorations ==
- Star Medal, 9th Class
- Star Medal, 8th Class
- Star Medal, 7th Class
- Star Medal, 6th Class
- Star Medal, 5th Class
- Star Medal, 4th Class
- Star Medal, 3rd Class
- Star Medal, 2nd Class
- Star Medal, 1st Class
- Pilot Badge
