= Feng Zhi =

Chinese writer and translator

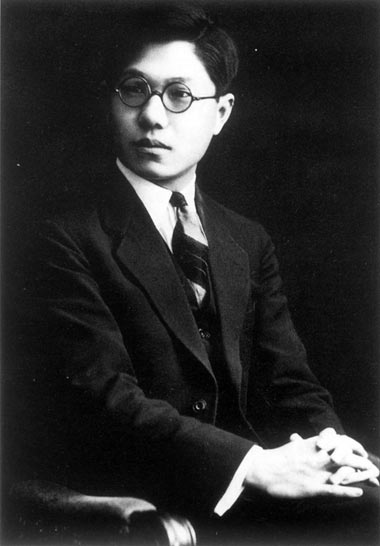
- Born: 17 September 1905; Zhuozhou, Qing China
- Died: 22 February 1993 (aged 87); Beijing, China
- Education: Peking University; Heidelberg University
- Writing career
- Language: Mandarin
- Notable awards: Goethe Medal

Feng Zhi (Chinese: 馮至; pinyin: Féng Zhì; Wade–Giles: Feng Chih; 17 September 1905 – 22 February 1993) was a Chinese writer and translator. He was also the director and then honorary director of the Institute of Foreign Literature, Chinese Academy of Social Sciences since 1964.

Feng published several collections of poems, including Songs of Yesterday and Northern Journey and Other Poems, in his early life. Then he went to Germany and introduced the poetry of Rilke, Goethe, Heine, along with Novalis afterwards, thus he was bestowed Goethe Medal in the 1980s. He was also a scholar of Du Fu.
