= 1902 in China =

- Decades: 1880s; 1890s; 1900s; 1910s; 1920s
- See also: Other events of 1902; History of China • Timeline • Years

Events from the year 1902 in China.

== Incumbents ==
- Guangxu Emperor (23rd year)

== Events ==
- signing of the Mackay Treaty — a sixteen article treaty signed by the governments of Great Britain and the Chinese Qing dynasty on 5 September 1902. Under the terms of the treaty, the likin system of taxation was abolished and the first moves made to abolish extraterritoriality for foreign nationals.

== Births ==
- 7 May — Guo Tianmin (郭天民), general in the People's Liberation Army of the People's Republic of China from Hubei (d. 1970)
- 25 June — Li Ziming ( (李子鳴), martial artist (d. 1993)
