= Lu Kanru =

Lu Kanru 陆侃如
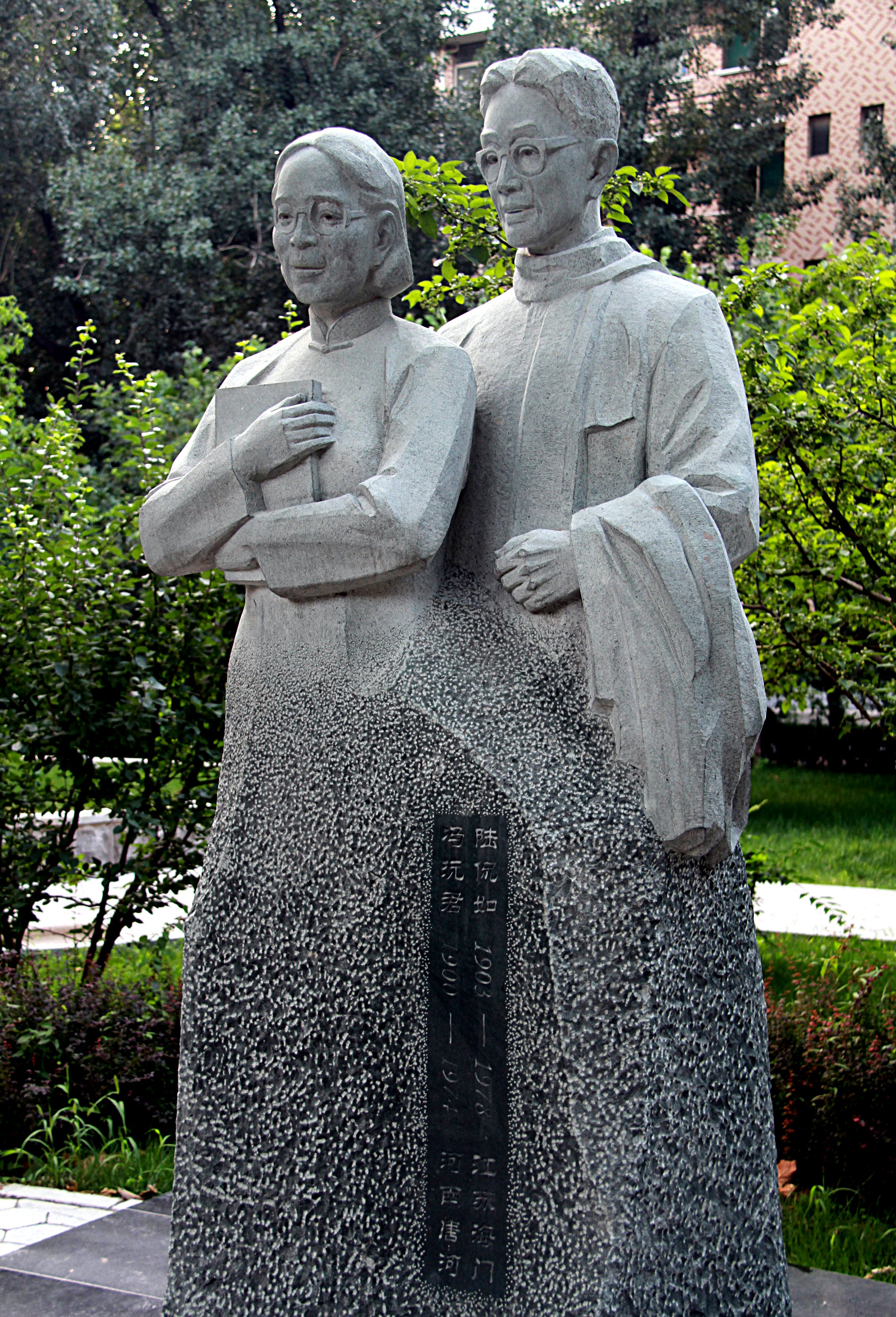
- Statue of Lu Kanru and his wife Feng Yuanjun on the Central Campus of Shandong University
- Born: 陸侃; 16 November 1903; Haimen, Jiangsu, Qing
- Died: 1 December 1978 (aged 75)
- Other name: 衍庐
- Education: Peking University
- Occupation: scholar
- Spouse: Feng Yuanjun (1929–1974, her death)
- Parent: 陆措宜 (father)

Lu Kanru (Chinese: 陸侃如; November 16, 1903 – December 1, 1978) was a scholar of classical Chinese literature and a lifelong collaborator of his wife Feng Yuanjun. Like his wife, he worked at Shandong University for most of his career.

In the preface to their You Guo'en, Lu described his and Feng's work thusly:

It should be understood that ‘questioning antiquity’ is our stance, while textual research is our method. (Note: 当知疑古是我们的主张，考证是 我们的方法。)
