= Hu Zi'ang =

Chinese politician

Hu Zi'ang (Chinese: 胡子昂; March, 1897 – November 19, 1991) was a Chinese male politician, who served as the vice chairperson of the Chinese People's Political Consultative Conference.
