= 1906 in China =

- Decades: 1880s; 1890s; 1900s; 1910s; 1920s
- See also: Other events of 1906; History of China • Timeline • Years

Events from the year 1906 in China.

== Incumbents ==
- Guangxu Emperor (32nd year)

=== Viceroys ===
- Viceroy of Zhili — Yuan Shikai
- Viceroy of Min-Zhe — Duanfang then Zhou Fu then Ding Zhenduo
- Viceroy of Huguang — Zhang Zhidong
- Viceroy of Shaan-Gan — Shengyun
- Viceroy of Liangguang — Cen Chunxuan then Zhou Fu
- Viceroy of Yun-Gui — Ding Zhenduo then Cen Chunxuan
- Viceroy of Sichuan — Xiliang
- Viceroy of Liangjiang — Duanfang

== Events ==
- April 27 - Chinese representative Tang Shaoyi and the British Ambassador to China, Ernest Mason Satow, formally signed the Convention Between Great Britain and China Respecting Tibet. Britain agreed not to occupy Tibet and not to interfere in Tibetan politics.

== Births ==
- Fei Mu - October 10, 1906
- Aisin Gioro Puyi
