= Xu Yingkui =

Qing dynasty politician (1830–1903)

- 許應騤
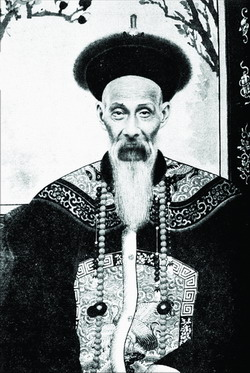

Viceroy of Min-Zhe
- In office 1898–1903

Personal details
- Born: 1830 Yuexiu, Guangzhou, Guangdong, Qing Dynasty
- Died: 22 July 1906 (aged 75–76) Panyu, Guangzhou, Guangdong, Qing Dynasty

Chinese name
- Traditional Chinese: 許應騤
- Simplified Chinese: 许应骙
Transcriptions
Standard Mandarin
- Hanyu Pinyin: Xǔ Yīngkuí
- Wade–Giles: Hsü^{3} Ying^{1}-k'uei^{2}
Wu
- Wugniu: Shiu^{5} In^{1}-guae^{2}
Hakka
- Pha̍k-fa-sṳ: Hí Yin-khúi
Yue: Cantonese
- Jyutping: Heoi^{2} Jing^{1}-kwai^{4}
Southern Min
- Hokkien POJ: Khó͘ Eng-kúi

First-rank court official Xu Yingkui (Chinese: 許應騤; Wade–Giles: Hsu Ying-k'uei, 1830– 22 July 1906), courtesy names Jun'an (筠庵) and Changde (昌德), was a 19th-century Qing dynasty politician who served as Viceroy of Min-Zhe, Governor of Fuzhou and General of Fujian from 1898 to 1903. He was one of the two Chinese representatives who signed the Convention for the Extension of Hong Kong Territory, the other being Li Hongzhang. During Kang Youwei's Hundred Days' Reform, Xu opposed the reform and personally filed a complaint against Kang's conduct and political orientations.

== Family ==
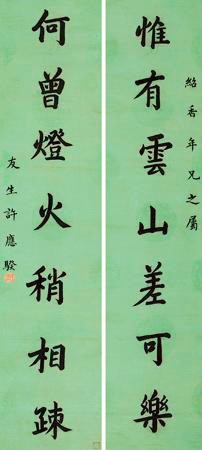
Antithetical couplet by Xu Yingkui as a gift for his friend

Xu was born in a prestigious gentry family from Guangzhou, Guangdong province, historically Panyu county of Guangzhou prefecture. His grandfather Xu Baiting was a salt trader who acquired the status of gentry with the grace of the Jiaqing Emperor. His uncle Xu Xiangguang supported and financed Hong Kong's military resistance against the British empire as well as the construction of Kowloon Walled City.

Hong Kong actor Benz Hui was one of Xu Yingkui's great grandsons.

== Viceroy of Min-Zhe ==
During the Boxer Rebellion, Xu was the viceroy of Minzhe. Xu, along with Li Hongzhang, viceroy of Liangguang, Liu Kunyi, viceroy of Liangjiang, Zhang Zhidong, viceroy of Huguang, Sheng Xuanhuai, director of the Court of Judicature and Revision, and Yuan Shikai, governor of Shandong, signed the Mutual Protection of Southeast China agreement, openly defying the proclamation of war declared by the imperial court in Beijing against Britain, the United States, France, Germany, Italy, Japan, and Russia, with the aim of preserving peace in their provinces.

As a viceroy, Xu Yingkui was aware of the weaknesses of China when it faces the outer world. He accepted the suggestion of an American diplomat and established the Gulangyu International Settlement. Under the circumstances of a potential Japanese occupation of the island of Gulangyu, Xu started negotiations with the British who were interested in the military value of Gulangyu. To counterbalance the Japanese, Xu was willing to yield the island as an international public settlement. The British government wanted complete separation of the island from Chinese administration, whereas China hoped to maintain nominal sovereignty of the island. The disagreement was eventually taken to the viceroy. Xu waived the sovereignty conditionally, obliging every country which partook in the settlement to provide military protection for the city of Xiamen. The Qing imperial court reviewed his proposal and deleted the article concerning Xiamen, fearing it would open the gates of Xiamen to the foreign powers. On 10 January 1902, the constitution of Gulangyu International Settlement was signed by China, Japan, Britain, the U.S., Germany, France, Spain, Netherlands, Sweden and Norway.

After his retirement, Xu intended to construct a large and luxurious private garden in Guangzhou but died before the plan was carried out.
