= Wei Guangtao =

- 魏光燾
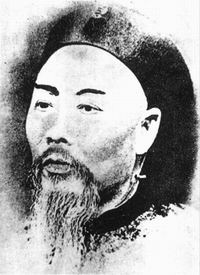

Governor of Xinjiang
- In office 1889–1892
- Monarch: Guangxu
- Preceded by: Liu Jintang
- Succeeded by: Wen Shilin

Viceroy of Yun-Gui
- In office 1900–1902
- Preceded by: Songfan
- Succeeded by: Ding Zhenduo

Viceroy of Shaan-Gan
- In office 1899 (As Acting Governor until 1900) – 1900
- Preceded by: Tao Mo
- Succeeded by: Songfan

Viceroy of Liangjiang
- In office December 5, 1902 – September 4, 1904
- Preceded by: Zhang Zhidong
- Succeeded by: Li Xingrui

Viceroy of Min-Zhe
- In office 1904–1905
- Preceded by: Li Xingrui
- Succeeded by: Shengyun

Personal details
- Born: November 27, 1837 Shaoyang County, Baoqing Mansion, Hunan, Qing China
- Died: March 15, 1916 (aged 78)

Military service
- Allegiance: Qing Dynasty
- Branch: Xiang Army
- Years of service: 1856 — 1905
- Battles/wars: Taiping Rebellion; First Sino-Japanese War; Dungan Revolt

Wei Guangtao (November 27, 1837 – March 15, 1916), courtesy name Wuzhuang was a Chinese politician who was the Governor of Xinjiang, Viceroy of Yun-Gui, Viceroy of Shaan-Gan, Viceroy of Liangjiang, and Viceroy of Min-Zhe. He was also notable for his military service during the First Sino-Japanese War and Dungan Revolt.

== Biography ==
Wentong worked in the Jiangxi military camp to choose from Jiupin in 1859. In 1860, Guangtao was sent to Cheng County regardless of double single month selection with employment under Lan Ling. In 1861, Guangtao was selected for prestigious county selection and from 1861 until 1863 as a Hualing. In 1863, Guangtao decided to stay Zhejiang for supplementary use. He was exempt from the class in 1864 but still stayed and made up the time by producing vaccines. In 1865, Guangtao followed Taoist beliefs and in 1866, spent his time working in salt transport. In 1867, Guangtao was promoted to Circuit Officer and nominated for first class. In 1883, he was appointed the chief ambassador of Gansu from 1884-1885. Guangtao would then begin to be assigned to be viceroy of several viceroys across China as starting from 1889-1892 he was chief ambassador of Xinjiang, then to Viceroy of Jiangxi in 1896, Viceroy of Yun-Gui from 1900 to 1902, Governor of Shaanxi from 1900, Viceroy of Liangjiang from December 5, 1902 – September 4, 1904 and finally as Viceroy of Min-Zhe from 1904 to 1905. He was supposed to be Viceroy of Huguang in 1911 but was never assumed office.

During the First Sino-Japanese War, Wei Guangtao, then the Xinjiang feudal commander, led the Wuwei Army's 6th Battalion with 3,300 people in the Battle of Niuzhuang. With the aid of Li Guangjiu, the Japanese army was outnumbered for a whole day and night, and the remaining troops broke through.

=== Family ===
His grandson Wei Rongje was a Chinese scientist, academician of Chinese Academy of Sciences and a professor at Nanjing University.

== Bibliography ==
- From the Founding of Sanjiang Normal University to Wei Guangtao and Li Ruiqing Wei Rongjue
- Zhao Weixi. From Frontier Officials to Frontier Officials: A Biography of Wei Guangtao. Beijing: China Social Sciences Press. 2018. ISBN 978-7-5203-2395-6
