= Viceroy of Min-Zhe =

Qing-era administrator of Zhejiang and Fujian

Chinese name
- Traditional Chinese: 閩浙總督
- Simplified Chinese: 闽浙总督
Transcriptions
Standard Mandarin
- Hanyu Pinyin: Mǐnzhè Zǒngdū
- Wade–Giles: Min-Che Tsung-tu

Governor-General of Min-Zhe Provinces and Other Local Areas, in Charge of Military Affairs, Food and Wages and Governor Affairs (full title)
- Traditional Chinese: 总督闽浙等处地方提督军务、粮饟兼巡抚事
- Simplified Chinese: 总督闽浙等处地方提督军务、粮饷兼巡抚事
Transcriptions

Manchu name
- Manchu script: ᡶᡠᡤᡳᠶᠠᠨ ᠵᡝᡤᡳᠶᠠᠩ ᠨᡳ ᡠᡥᡝᡵᡳ ᡴᠠᡩᠠᠯᠠᡵᠠ ᠠᠮᠪᠠᠨ
- Romanization: fugiyan jegiyang ni uheri kadalara amban

Jurisdiction of the Viceroy of Min-Zhe in 1894

The Viceroy of Min-Zhe, fully in Chinese as the Governor-General of Min-Zhe Provinces and Other Local Areas, in Charge of Military Affairs, Food and Wages and Governor Affairs, was one of eight Viceroys during the Qing dynasty. The Viceroy of Min-Zhe had jurisdiction of military, civil, and political affairs over then Fujian Province, Zhejiang Province, and Taiwan Province (approx. nowadays Fujian, Zhejiang, and Taiwan).

Taiwan was under the Viceroy's jurisdiction since the establishment of the office in 1645 until the Qing-Japan Treaty of Shimonoseki in 1895.

== History ==
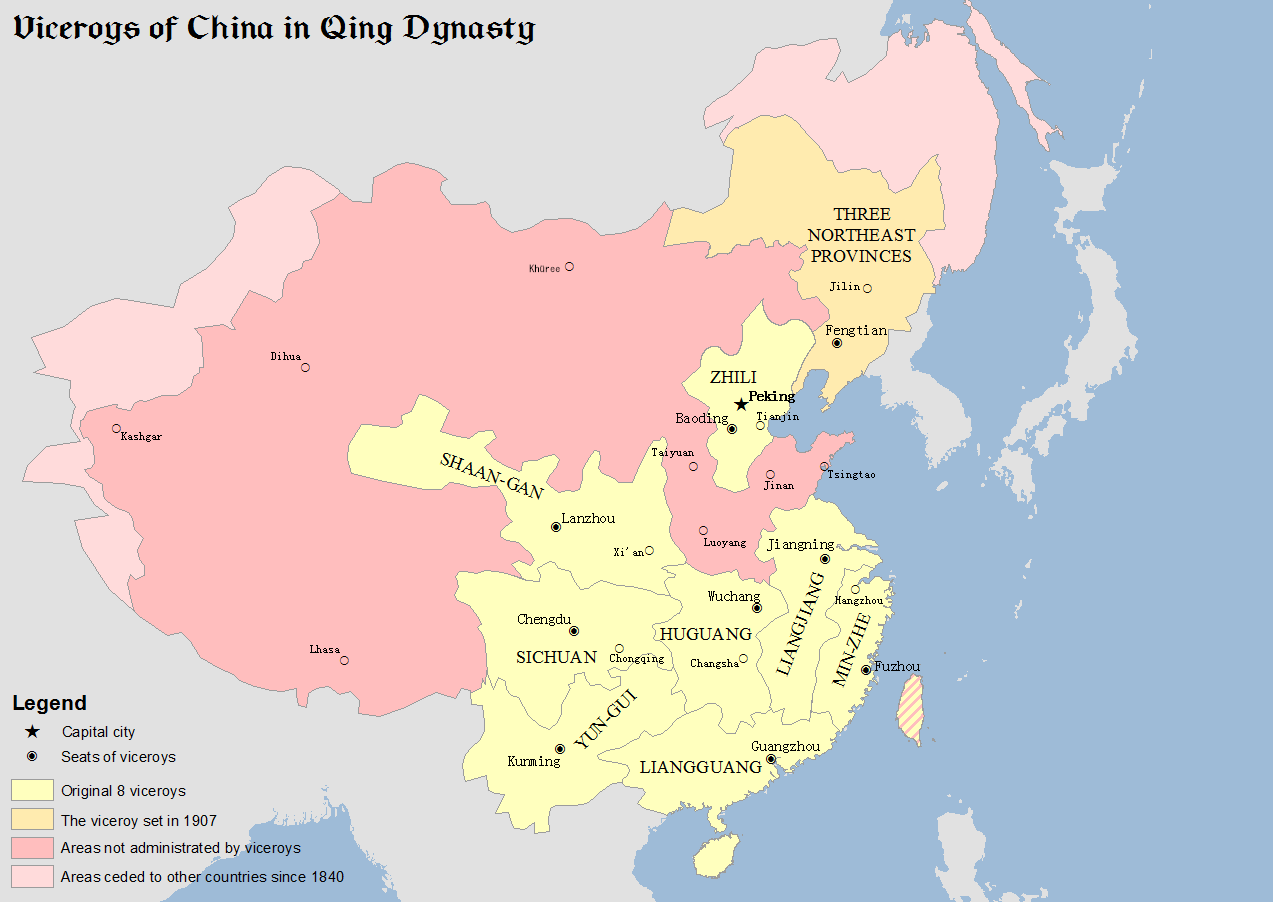
Map of viceroys in Qing Dynasty of China

The office of Viceroy of Min-Zhe was created under the name "Viceroy of Zhe-Min" in 1645 during the reign of the Shunzhi Emperor. At the time of its creation, its headquarters were in Fuzhou, Fujian Province. In 1648, the headquarters shifted to Quzhou, Zhejiang Province. About 10 years later, the office split into the Viceroy of Fujian and Viceroy of Zhejiang, which were respectively based in Zhangzhou and Wenzhou.

In 1672, during the reign of the Kangxi Emperor, the office of the Viceroy of Fujian shifted from Zhangzhou back to Fuzhou. In 1687, the Viceroy of Fujian was renamed "Viceroy of Min-Zhe".

In 1727, the Yongzheng Emperor specially appointed Li Wei as Viceroy of Zhejiang. The Viceroy of Min-Zhe, on the other hand, was in charge of only Fujian. The two offices were merged under "Viceroy of Min-Zhe" in 1734.

In 1736, the Qianlong Emperor restored the earlier system by appointing Ji Zengyun (嵇曾筠) as the Viceroy of Zhejiang, managing only Zhejiang. Hao Yulin (郝玉麟), the Viceroy of Min-Zhe, was in charge of only Fujian. These changes were reversed in 1738 after the Qianlong Emperor recalled Ji Zengyun back to the imperial capital, leaving Hao Yulin in charge of both Zhejiang and Fujian.

In 1885, during the reign of the Guangxu Emperor, the office of Provincial Governor of Fujian was merged into the office of the Viceroy of Min-Zhe.

In 1911, the last Viceroy of Minzhe Songshou was overthrown and killed by soldiers in mutiny during the Xinhai revolution.

== List of Viceroys of Min-Zhe ==
#	Name	Portrait	Start of term	End of term	Notes
Viceroy of Zhe-Min (1645–1658)
1	Zhang Cunren 張存仁		1645	1647	
2	Chen Jin 陳錦		1647	1652	
3	Liu Qingtai 劉清泰		1652	1654	
4	Tuntai 屯泰		1654	1656	
5	Li Shuaitai 李率泰		1656	1658	
Viceroy of Zhejiang (1658–1687)
6	Zhao Guozuo 趙國祚		1658	1661	
7	Zhao Tingchen 趙廷臣		1661	1669	
8	Liu Zhaoqi 劉兆麒		1669	1673	
9	Li Zhifang 李之芳		1673	1682	
10	Shi Weihan 施維翰		1682	1683	
11	Wang Guo'an 王國安		1684	1684	
Viceroy of Fujian (1658–1687)
6	Li Shuaitai 李率泰		1658	1664	
7	Zhu Changzuo 朱昌祚		1664	1665	
8	Zhang Chaolin 張朝璘		1666	1667	
9	Zu Zepu 祖澤溥		1667	1669	
10	Liu Dou 劉斗		1670	1672	
11	Fan Chengmo 范承謨		1672	1674	
12	Lang Tingzuo 郎廷佐		1674	1676	
13	Lang Tingxiang 郎廷相		1676	1678	
14	Yao Qisheng 姚啟聖		1678	1683	
15	Shi Weihan 施維翰		1683	1684	
16	Wang Guo'an 王國安		1684	1687	
Viceroy of Min-Zhe (1687–1911)
17	Wang Xinming 王新命		1687	1688	
18	Wang Zhi 王騭		1688	1689	
19	Xing Yongchao 興永朝		1689	1692	
20	Zhu Hongzuo 朱宏祚		1692	1695	
21	Guo Shilong 郭世隆		1695	1702	
22	Jin Shirong 金世榮		1702	1706	
23	Liang Nai 梁鼐		1706	1710	
24	Fan Shichong 范時崇		1710	1715	
25	Gioro-Mamboo 覺羅滿保		1715	1725	
26	Gao Qizhuo 高其倬		1725	1729	
27	Shi Yizhi 史貽直		1729	1730	
28	Gao Qizhuo 高其倬		1730	1730	
29	Liu Shiming 劉世明		1730	1732	
30	Hao Yulin 郝玉麟		1732	1739	
Viceroy of Zhejiang (1727–1734, 1736–1738) (coexisted with the Viceroy of Min-Zhe)
	Li Wei 李衛		1727	1732	
	Cheng Yuanzhang 程元章		1732	1734	
	Ji Zengyun 嵇曾筠		1736	1738	
Viceroy of Min-Zhe (1687–1911)
31	Depei 德沛		1739	1742	
32	Nasutu 那蘇圖		1742	1744	
33	Martai 馬爾泰		1744	1746	
34	Ka'erjishan 喀爾吉善		1746	1757	
35	Yang Yingju 楊應琚		1757	1759	
36	Yang Tingzhang 楊廷璋		1759	1764	
37	Suchang 蘇昌		1764	1768	
38	Cui Yingjie 崔應階		1768	1770	
39	Zhongyin 鍾音		1770	1778	
40	Yang Jingsu 楊景素		1778	1779	
41	Sanbao 三寶		1779	1780	
42	Fuming'an 富明安		1780	1781	
43	Chen Huizu 陳輝祖		1781	1782	
44	Fulehun 富勒渾		1782	1785	
45	Yade 雅德		1785	1786	
46	Fugang 富綱		1786	1786	
47	Changqing 常青		1786	1787	
48	Li Shiyao 李侍堯		1787	1788	
49	Fuk'anggan 福康安		1788	1789	
50	Ulana 伍拉納		1789	1795	
51	Fuk'anggan 福康安		1795	1796	
52	Kuilun 魁倫		1796	1799	
53	Shulin 書麟		1799	1799	
54	Gioro-Changlin 覺羅長麟		1799	1800	
55	Yude 玉德		1800	1806	
56	Alinbao 阿林保		1806	1809	
57	Fang Weidian 方維甸		1809	1810	
58	Wang Zhiyi 汪志伊		1810	1817	
59	Dong Jiaozeng 董教增		1817	1820	
60	Qingbao 慶保		1820	1822	
61	Zhao Shenzhen 趙慎畛		1822	1825	
62	Sun Erzhun 孫爾准		1825	1832	
63	Cheng Zuluo 程祖洛		1832	1836	
64	Zhong Xiang 鍾祥		1836	1839	
65	Zhou Tianjue 周天爵		1839	1839	
66	Guiliang 桂良		1839	1839	
67	Deng Tingzhen 鄧廷楨		1839	1840	
68	Yan Botao 顏伯燾		1840	1841	
69	Yang Guozhen 楊國楨		1841	1842	
70	Yiliang 怡良		1842	1843	
71	Liu Yunke 劉韻珂		1843	1850	
72	Yutai 裕泰		1850	1851	
73	Ji Zhichang 季芝昌		1851	1852	
74	Wu Wenrong 吳文鎔		1852	1853	
75	Huicheng 慧成		1853	1853	
76	Wang Yide 王懿德		1854	1859	
77	Qingrui 慶端		1859	1862	
78	Qiling 耆齡		1862	1863	
79	Zuo Zongtang 左宗棠		1863	1866	
80	Wu Tang 吳棠		1866	1867	
81	Ma Xinyi 馬新貽		1867	1868	
82	Yinggui 英桂		1868	1871	
83	Zhang Zhiwan 張之萬		1871	1871	
84	Li Henian 李鶴年		1871	1876	
85	Wenyu 文煜		1876	1876	
86	He Jing 何璟		1876	1884	
87	Yang Changjun 楊昌濬		1884	1888	
88	Bian Baodi 卞寶第		1888	1892	
89	Tan Zhonglin 譚鍾麟		1892	1894	
90	Bian Baoquan 邊寶泉		1894	1898	
91	Xu Yingkui 許應騤		1898	1903	
92	Xiliang 錫良		1903	1903	
93	Li Xingrui 李興銳		1903	1904	
94	Wei Guangtao 魏光燾		1904	1905	
95	Shengyun 升允		1905	1905	
96	Songfan 嵩蕃		1905	1905	
97	Duanfang 端方		1905	1906	
98	Zhou Fu 周馥		1906	1906	
99	Ding Zhenduo 丁振鐸		1906	1907	
100	Songshou 松壽		1907	1911	

== Related topics ==
- History of Taiwan
- History of Fujian
- History of Zhejiang
