= Industry in Tianjin =

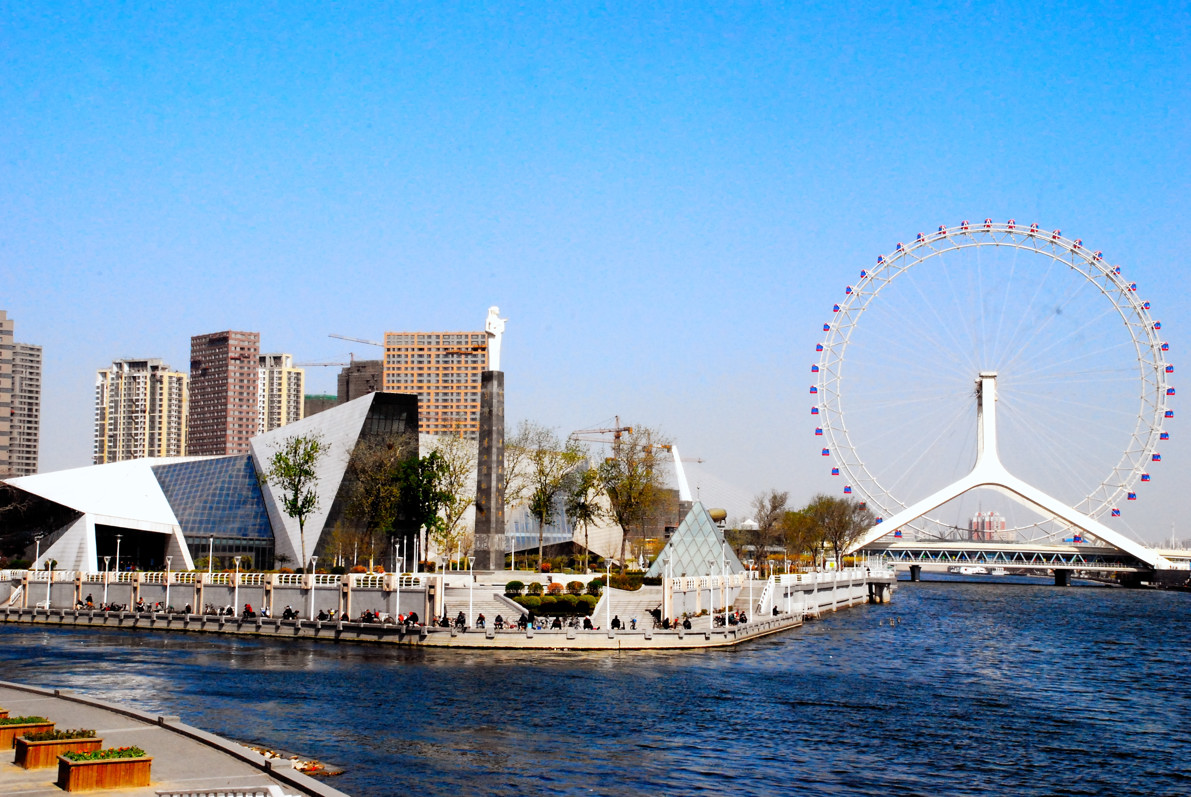
The Tianjin Museum of Modern Industry and The Tientsin Eye

The city of Tianjin considers itself the original home or birthplace of Chinese industrial revolution. Modern industry started there with Tianjin Machine Factory which was established by the Qing government during the Self-Strengthening Movement. Afterwards, Yuan Shikai promoted new policies in Tianjin. Numerous modern industrial enterprises mushroomed in Hebei New District in the northern bank of the Hai River. Including Zhou Xuexi, many industrialists established large enterprise groups that were managed by merchant and supervised by the government. By the beginning of the 20th century, Chinese private enterprises were booming. Among them is the most representative Yongli Alkali Factory which won the gold award and certificate in Philadelphia, the U.S. in 1926 by the sodium carbonate it produced. The factory was praised as "the symbol of developing important chemical industry of the Republic China". The development of Tianjin's modern industrial and the establishment of the Concessions in Tianjin contributed to the rapid expansion of modern Tianjin to become the biggest city and center of industry and commerce in northern China, as well as the second biggest city of industry, finance and trade in China. The development of Tianjin modern industry mainly went through four stages: initial period, evolution period, booming period and occupied period. Because of the industrial boom of Tianjin modern industry, the government of Tianjin built The Tianjin Museum of Modern Industry in Divergence estuary for commemoration.

== Initial Period ==
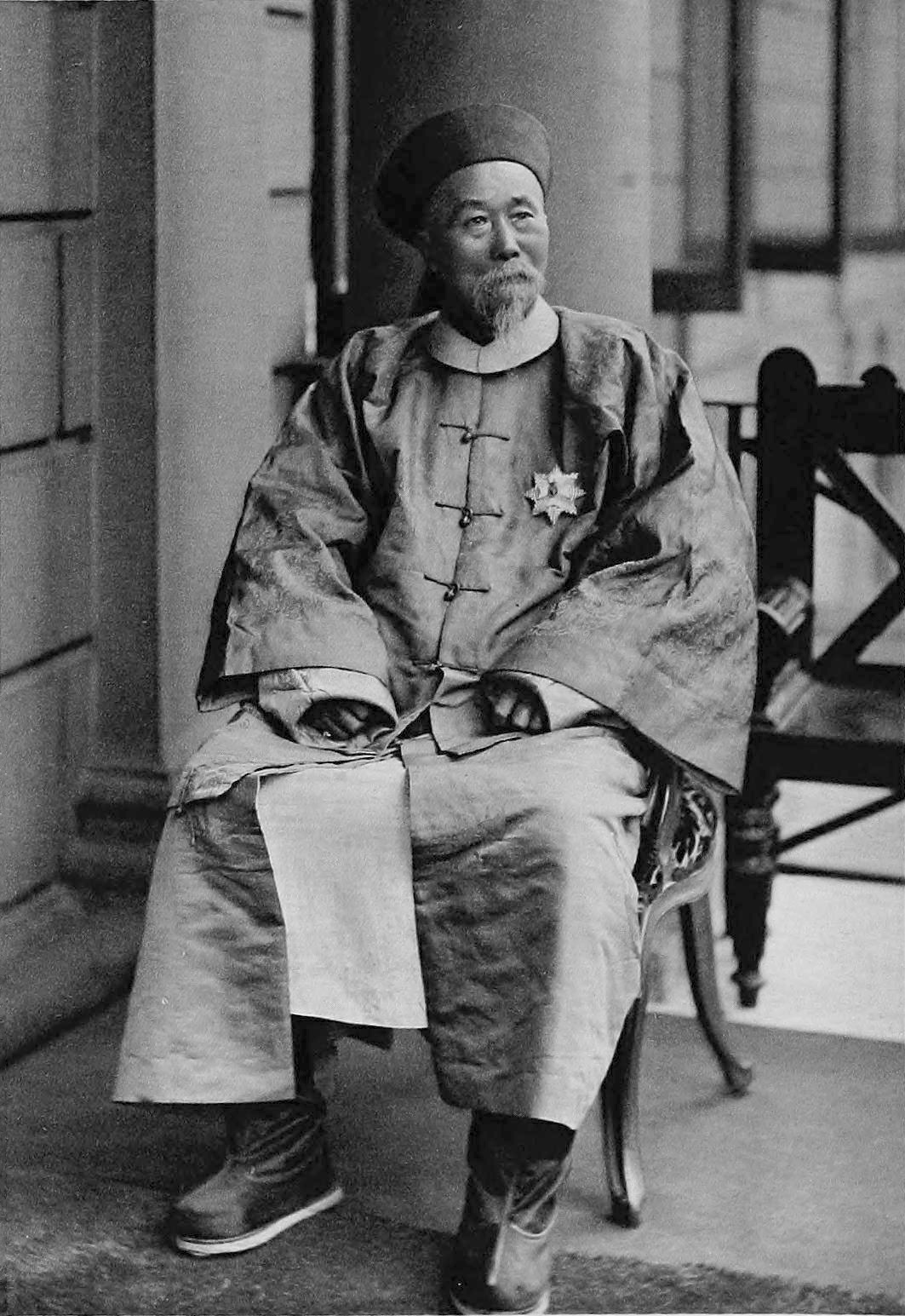
One of the core leading figures in Tianjin Self-Strengthening Movement: Li Hongzhang

The initial period of Tianjin modern industry refers to the Self-Strengthening Movement after its port opening. Under the influence of Self-Strengthening Movement, from 1866, the Qing government gradually established a wide range of military industries in Tianjin and its surrounding areas. In order to deal with foreign trade, the Qing government also set a position of Sankou Trading Minster (changed into North Trading Minster in 1870, post held by Viceroy of Zhili ). Tianjin then became the core area of Li Hongzhang's northern base, and this period is the initial period of Tianjin modern industry development.

=== The military industries established by the Westernization Group ===
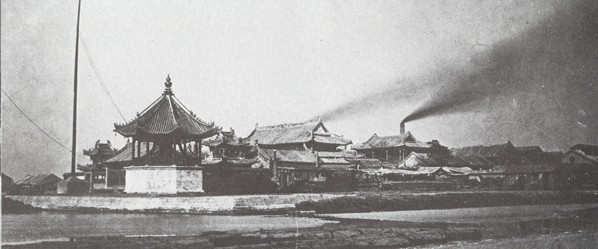
Full view of Haiguang temple and the western department of Tianjin Machine Factory

After the Second Opium War, the Self-Strengthening Movement in the Qing Dynasty began to flourish, and the "Westernization Group" started to establish government-sponsored industries, with focus on military industry. In 1867, a North Trading Minster called Chong Hou gained a land of 22 hectares near Jiajia Gu Dao located 18 kilometers from the old town of Tianjin. He entrenched and constructed a 4950-meter-long wall to build the eastern department of Tianjin Machine Factory. This gunpowder plant of the factory, often been called "Dong Ju Zi", was the earliest and biggest military industry of China at that time. This department provided northern provinces with guns and cartridges for military use, and also offered military materials for the Northern Fleet after the establishment of Beiyang Fleet. After Chong Hou, Viceroy of Zhili and North Trading Minster Li Hongzhang took over the Tianjin Machine Factory, it saw rapid development and became a large-scale military industrial factory covering machine manufacturing, metal refining, casting, hot working, basic chemistry, ship repair, etc. The eastern department of Tianjin Machine Factory gained the reputation of "One of the biggest machine factories in the world" at that time.

In order to enhance coastal defense, the Qing government assigned Li Hongzhang to establish Beiyang Fleet Dagu shipyard in Tianjin in 1880. Dagu shipyard is the first shipyard in the North of modern China, and is called one of "the three major bases of Beiyang Fleet" with Lüshun Military Harbor and Weihai Liugong Island. Its purpose was repairing the warships of the Beiyang Fleet, and it started producing munitions from 1890.

=== The establishment of "government-supervised and merchant-managed" enterprises ===
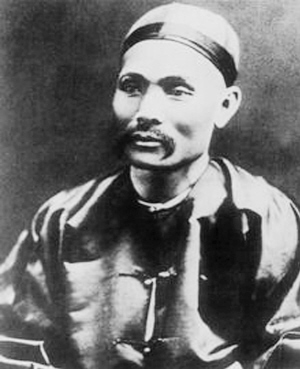
One of representatives of Self-Strengthening Movement: Tong King-sing

In order to cooperate with the development of military industry, in Tianjin, the Qing government built the earliest telegraph circuit, China's first autonomous standard railway, Kaiping Railway Company and Chinese Engineering and Mining Company. Chinese Engineering and Mining Company is the earliest large-scale mechanized coal-mining factory which offered military industries energies and materials. In 1878, Li Hongzhang was assigned to purchase Chinese Engineering and Mining Company that was established by Tong King-sing. At first, it was supposed to be government-managed, but later on because of the lack of funding, the Qing government made it government-supervised and merchant-managed. In the year of 1879, the telegraph circuit starting from Zhili Supervising Bureau, crossing the eastern department of Tianjin Machine Factory, Zizhulin concession, Chinese Merchants Steamship Company, to Taku Forts and Beitang military camp, is the earliest telegraph circuit in China. After that, the Tianjin-Shanghai telegraph circuit was constructed. Then the government established Tianjin Telegraph Headquarters in Tianjin, accompanied by the east subsidiary, the north subsidiary and the south subsidiary three subsidiaries. Although Tianjin Telegraph Group was "government-supervised and merchant-managed", all the "top official telegraphs" about foreign and military affairs would be sent in an order of "government first".

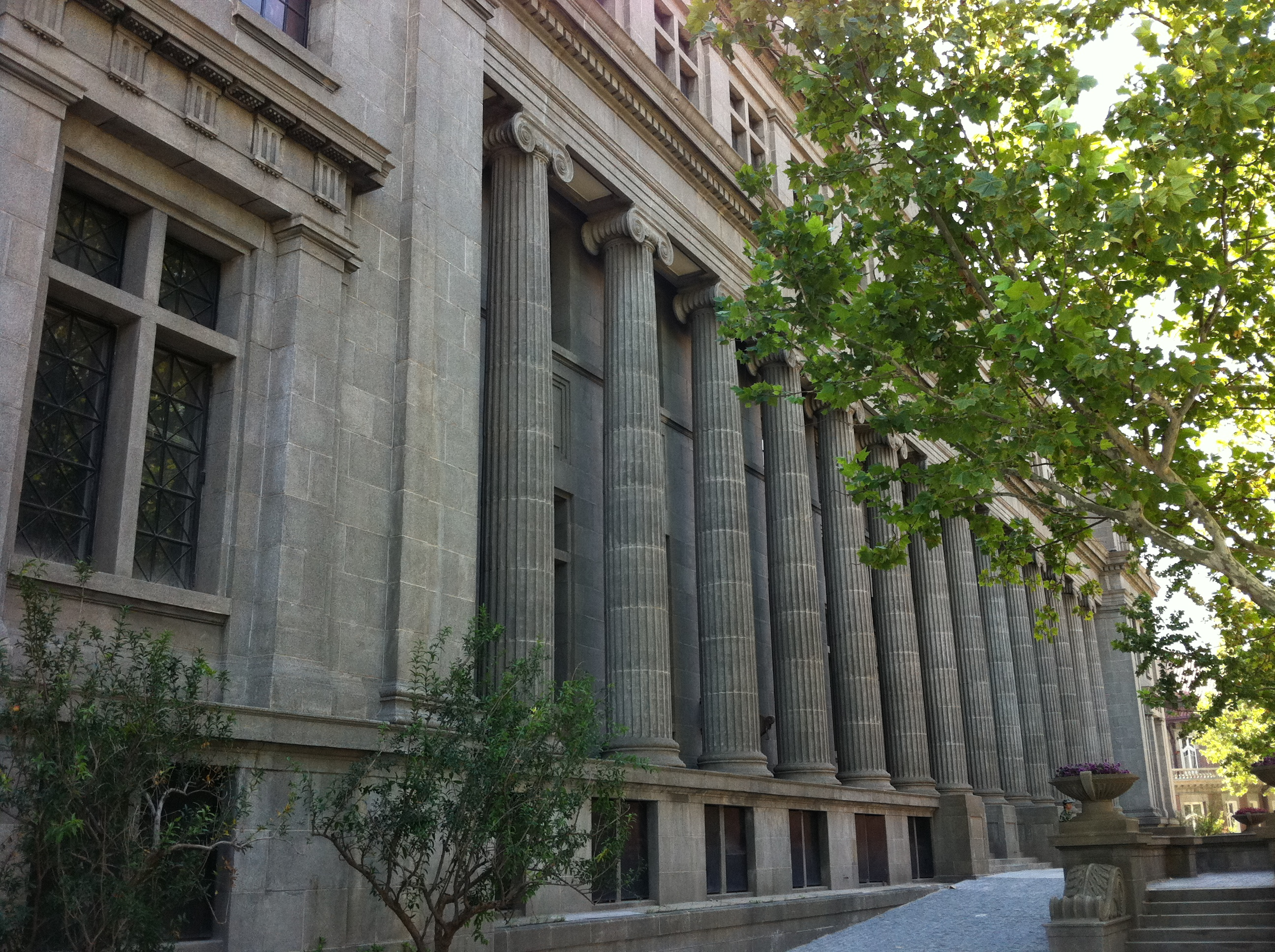
The former site of Kailuan Mining Headquarters

Established in 1880, the Tangshan-Xuegezhuang railway was suggested by Li Hongzhang to extend to Dagu and Tianjin for transporting Kaiping coals and munitions by Beiyang military forces. In 1887, Li Hongzhang changed the name of Kaiping Railway Company into Tianjin Railway Company (also Jingu Railway Company). After the construction of Jintang railway was completed, concerning about the defense of Beiyang, Li Hongzhang initiated the construction of railway from Tianjin to Shanhai Pass which was centered in Tianjin. Besides, in order to boost the trade contacts between the North and the South, Li Hongzhang established China Merchants Steamship Navigation Company as early as 1872. Its headquarter was in Shanghai, and Tianjin branch company was located in South Zizhuulin in Tianjin.

=== Early Foreign-funded enterprises ===
The earliest foreign-run modern enterprise was Dagu Barge Company, a British company in 1874. This company, however, was later than the China Merchants Steamship Navigation Company that established by Li Hongzhang. Foreign capital was permitted to input in Tianjin for barge transport, and the time limit was settled by the Qing government. In May 1874, the British-invested Dagu Barge Company was established, with total capital of 33,000 dollars. In September 1889, Dagu Barge Company reshuffled into a limited liability company, and the total capital was 500,000 Liang. By 1900, there were totally 19 foreign-funded enterprises in Tianjin, among which 16 were run by Britain and Germany. These enterprises were mostly foreign trade companies, among then there were 11 packaging companies. Besides, other early foreign-capitalized companies were mostly small-scale civil industries.

=== The establishment of private capital enterprises ===
Compared to foreign capital enterprises, private capital enterprises in Tianjin was lagging behind. Yilaimu Machine Mill, established by Zhu Qi'ang in 1878, symbolized the beginning of private capital enterprises in Tianjin. Before 1900, the annual income of Yilaimu Machine Mill was 6,000 to 7,000 liang. Thereafter, private capital was continuously invested in and few mills were established, which could still sustain an income of 6,000 to 7,000 liang per mill per year. This proved that Yilaimu was in a rapidly expanding market. Although there is lack of historical record, it has been proved that among these newly established machine mills during the 1990s were three that had been recorded: Dalaisheng Machine Mill, Tianlihe Machine Mill and South Gate Ruichenghe Machine Mill.

Daide Machine Factory, established by a Cantonese merchant Luo Sanyou in 1884, was the first private capital ironworks in Tianjin. In the aspects of machine manufacturing, Tianjin also had Wanshun Ironworks which was established in the British concession in Tientsin in 1886. Besides, Taide and Wanshun were all located in Taku Road area (also Dagu Road today) that is near the concessions in Tianjin. In the beginning of the 20th century, there also existed an ironworks named Zhichang. Therefore, the industry was keeping its pace with the development of concessions in Tianjin, and the Taku Road was the birthplace of Tianjin early private capital machine manufacturing. In addition to above, early private capital machine processing industries include Jinjucheng Ironworks which was built in 1897 in Santiaoshi Road. Other industries, such as Tianjin Water Supply Company in 1886, Beiyang Cashmere Factory in 1897, and Beiyang Tannery in 1898, were all sponsored by a famous comprador Wu Kuiding. These companies were the earliest in the peer companies in Tianjin and even in the Northern part of China.

There were over 30 enterprises in the initial stage of Tianjin modern industry, among them were 19 foreign enterprises. In other 17 private industries, 6 of them were government-supervised or government-supervised and merchant-managed. These 6 enterprises were mostly related to military services, although they were government-supervised and merchant-managed in nature, in reality they were controlled by the government. Private enterprises had later investment, smaller scale and fewer types. In Tianjin, early modern industries were specialized in military industry, and were large-scale, and they ranked highly in China in many fields and were equipped with pioneering value. For instance, the first modern powder mill in China — the eastern department of Tianjin Machine Factory; China's first industrial technology school — Beiyang Telegraph School; the first autonomous standard railway and first telegraph circuit — “Beitang-Taku-Tianjin” military telegraph circuit; the first shipyard in North China, etc. All these are closely related to Tianjin.

== Evolution period ==
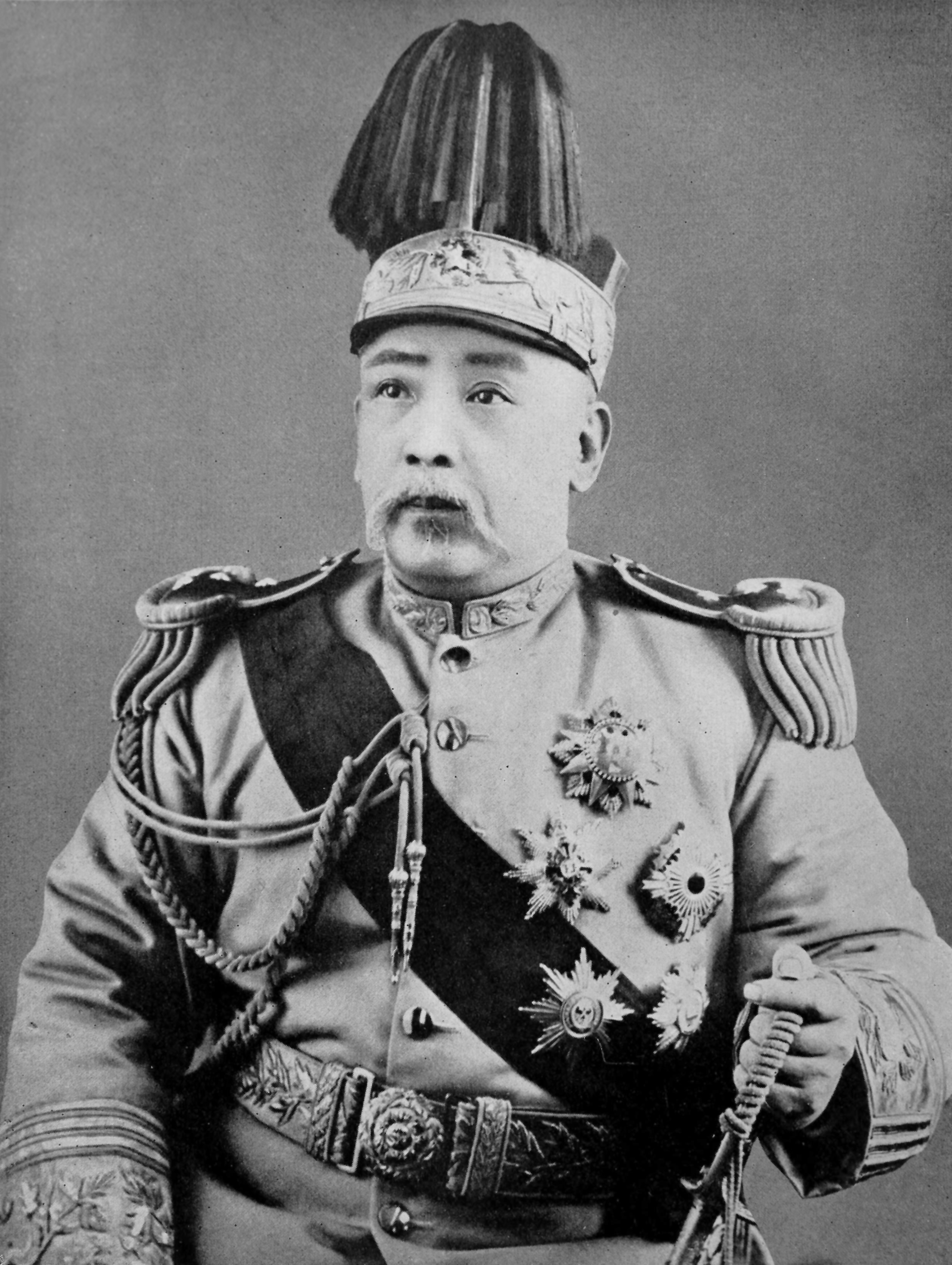
The advocate of Hebei New District: Yuan Shikai

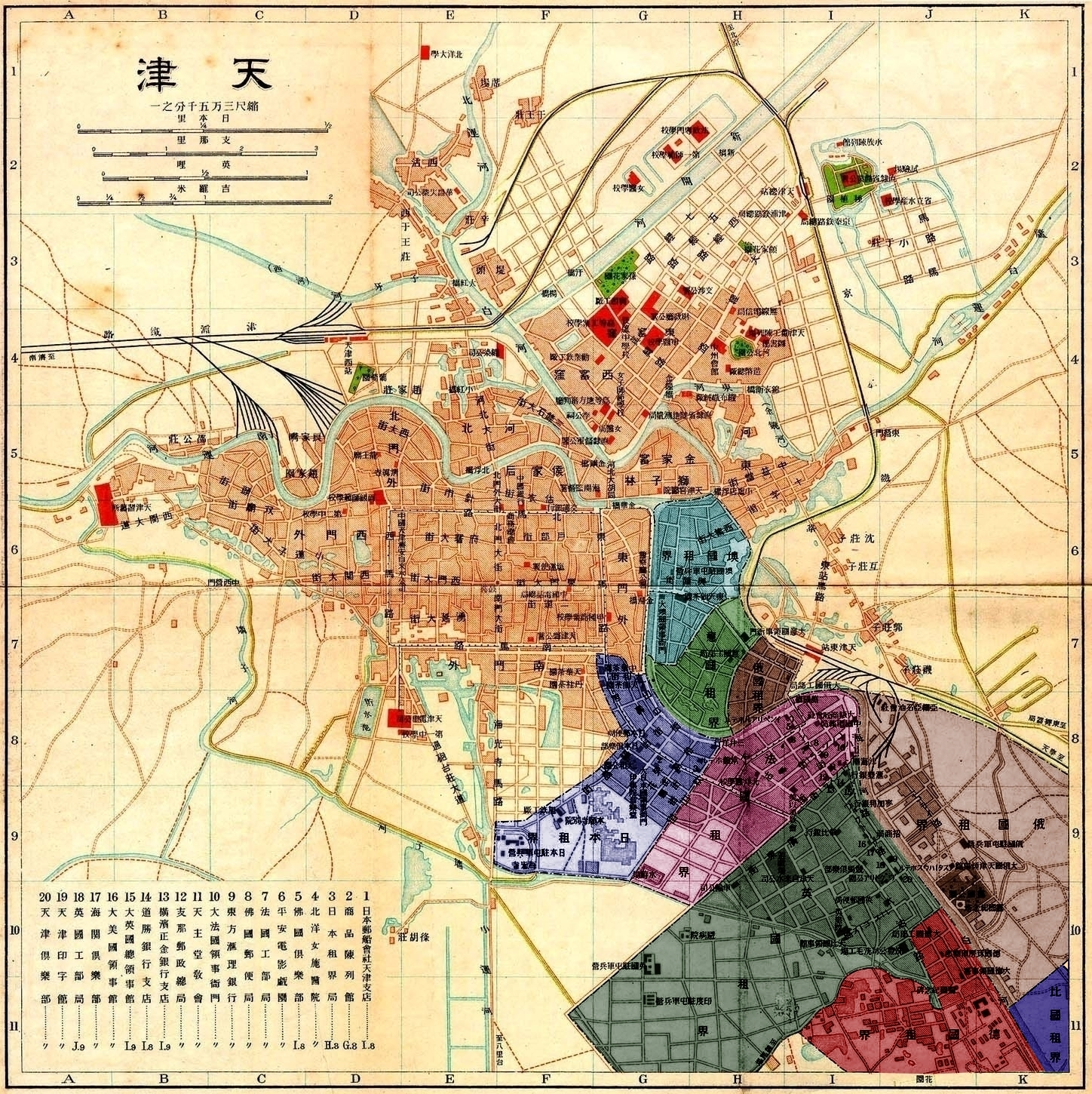
A map of Tianjin showing the construction of Hebei New District (North)

The evolution period of Tianjin modern industry began with the "New Policy" promoted within Tianjin by Yuan Shikai, until the establishment of Republic of China. In around 1902, the Viceroy of Zhili and Beiyang Commerce Minister Yuan Shikai, promoted his "New Policy" in Tianjin. The initial period of the establishment of Republic of China represents the evolution period of Tianjin modern industry, which concentrated on the constructing Hebei New District, thriving education on modern industry, and developing private capital enterprises.

=== The development of "government-supervised and merchant-managed" industries ===
The "New Policy" which was promoted by Yuan Shikai in the 20th century had brought about new opportunities for Tianjin modern industry. In 1902, Zhou Xuexi was assigned by Yuan Shikai to establish Beiyang Silver Dollar Company. By this success, in 1906, Zhou established some important government-supervised and merchant-managed companies like Beiyang Quanye Iron Factory, which made Hebei New District a significant industrial zone. Meanwhile, Hebei New District also established Zhili College of Industry, Craftmanship Factory, Apprentice Factory and other educational institutions, which made it an important educational base.

Zhou Xuexi took over Qixin Cement Company in Tangshan which had been closed down due to poor-quality products. Before its bankrupt, the company was Tangshan Fine Cotton Soil Company that was established by Tang Tingshu in 1889 and capitalized by private capital by Li Hongzhang. After taking over this company, Zhou Xuexi introduced contemporary most advanced cement production equipment—dry-process rotary cement kiln from Smith Company in Denmark—to produce high-quality products, which was a remarkable pioneering in China's cement production industry.

=== The transformation of military industry ===
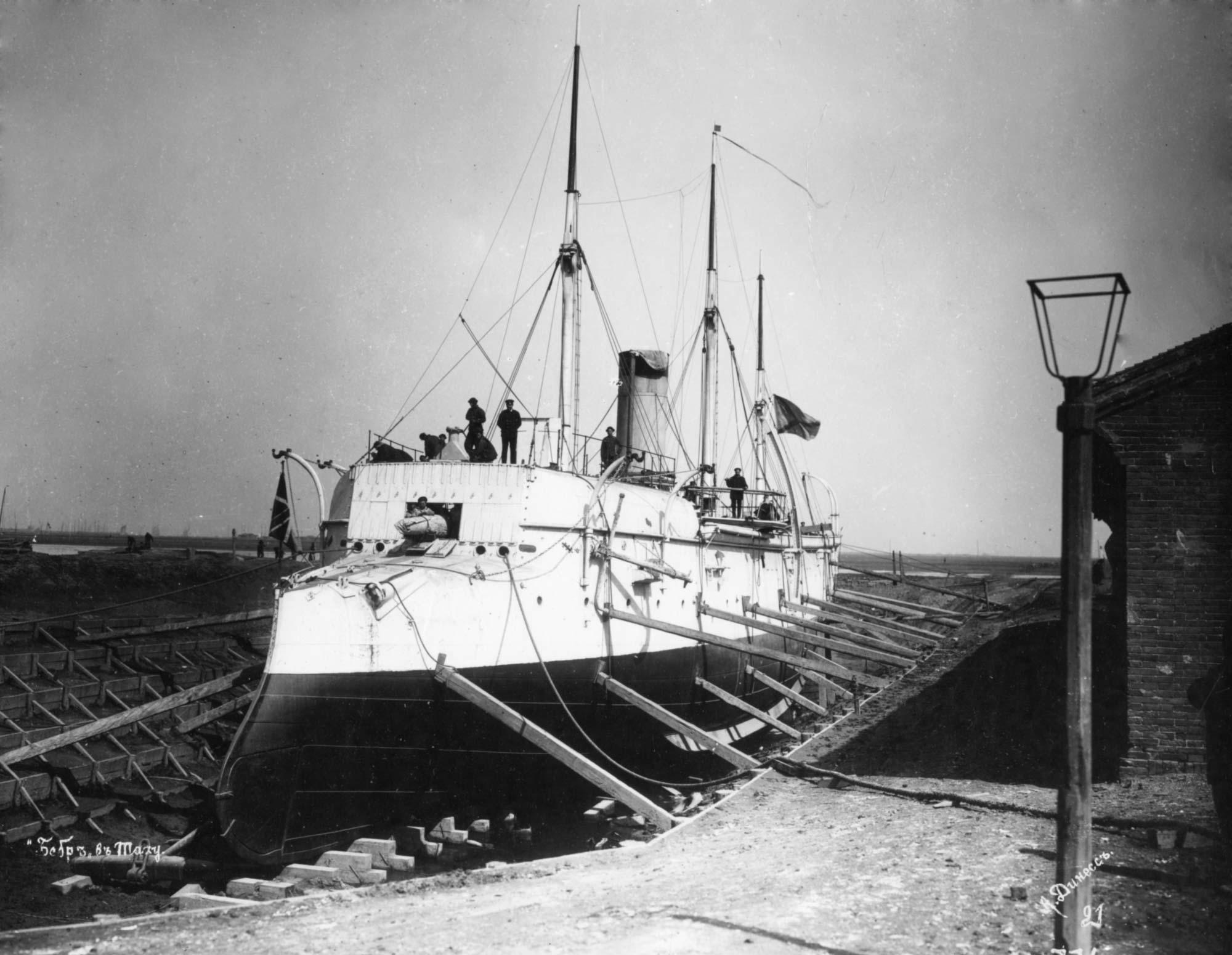
Russian warship on the shore of Dagu shipyard

In 1900, after Eight-Nation Alliance invaded China, large-scale government-managed industries in Tianjin were severely disrupted. The eastern department of Tianjin Machine Factory was occupied by the Eight-Nation Alliance and was then used as French military camp, while the western department, Haiguang Temple Machine Factory, was completely destroyed. In 1907 it was occupied by Japanese army, and then functioned as Japanese military camp. Beiyang Fleet Dagu Shipyard had been suffering a two-year occupation by Russia during 1900 and 1902. In 1906, Dagu shipyard came into service as a branch of Beiyang Quanye Iron Factory, and its powder factory was using as a school of military policemen. Since then, Dagu shipyard had been becoming a government-sponsored and merchant-managed enterprise.

=== The development of merchant-managed industries ===
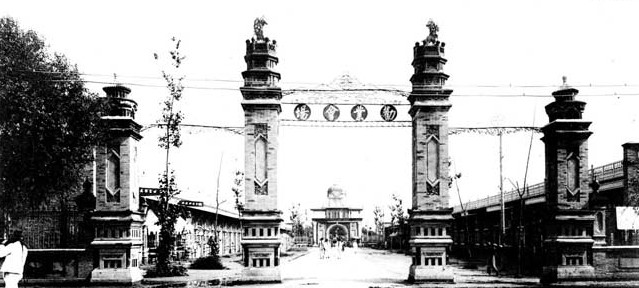
Tianjin Bazaar which was displaying industrial crafts of Tianjin

The private capital in Tianjin was accumulated in the ear of "New Policy", the construction of Hebei New District, Tianjin Currency Production Company, Zhili Craft Headquarter, and Beiyang Quanye Iron Factory were completed successively. In addition, the machine industry in Tianjin had already had its own merits and advantages, Santiaoshi Road area gradually formed the center of machine manufacturing industry. At the same time, the scope of this industrial zone expended from Hebei New District towards the west end of the Old Town of Tianjin. From 1902 to 1911, there were 139 industrial companies that had emerged in this city, covering mining industry, cement production, machine manufacturing, textile industry, food industry, etc. Among them, textile industry ranked top with the amount of 41, chemical industry (including the manufacture of matchsticks, leather, cosmetics and oil) ranked second with the amount of 31, food industry (including tobacco) ranked third with the amount of 20. Owing to these, Tianjin's pillar industries began to form. Many outstanding companies had been emerging at that time. For example, there are Tianjin Soap Factory which was established in 1905 near the Big Red Bridge, and tobacco company which was established by Ji Jufen in 1908. The steady development paved the way for afterward industrial prosperity of private capital enterprises in the period of Xinhai Revolution.
