= Chow Chung-cheng =

Chinese artist (1908–1996)

- Born: July 20, 1908
- Died: August 31, 1996 (aged 88)
- Education: Nankai University; Sciences Po
- Occupations: Artist author
- Years active: 1936–1996

Chow Chung-cheng (Chinese: 周仲铮; pinyin: Zhōu Zhòngzhēng; July 20, 1908 in Yanping, Fujian – August 31, 1996 in Bonn, Germany) was a Chinese artist known for her finger painting and autobiographical books.

== Early life and education ==
Zhou was born the 4th child in a family of two girls and three boys (2 boys died young). Her father, Zhou Xuehui, the youngest son of Zhou Fu, was a successful businessman who ran many of his brother Zhou Xuexi's enterprises. She was born Zhou Lianquan (Chinese 周莲荃 or 周莲全), but later changed her name to Zhongzheng.

Zhou was home schooled initially. When her demand to attend public school like her brothers and male cousins was denied, she seized the opportunity when her grandfather Zhou Fu died in 1921 in Tianjin, to ran away to Beijing. After three months negotiation with her parents openly, she returned home after they agreed that she and her sister were allowed to both attend public school and have the freedom to choose their husbands.

She attended Beiyang Women Normal School (now Hebei Normal University) and then Nankai University for three years. As a junior, she left Nankai for Europe on September 21, 1926. Her destination was England to studying medicine but she enrolled at Sciences Po in Paris, obtaining PhD degree in political science in 1933.

== Career ==
In 1936 Zhou returned to China with her husband. They settled in Beijing but Zhou soon returned to Paris and remarried a German in 1940.

She taught at Leiden University for 3 years. When World War II broke out the couple moved to Berlin. To make a living after the war, she studied painting from 1951 to 1953 under Prof. Alfred Mahlau at the Hochschule für bildende Künste Hamburg (University of Fine Arts in Hamburg). She had exhibitions of her paintings in West Germany, France, Italy, Spain and China. Most of her paintings were donated to Tianjin Art Museum (Chinese: 天津艺术博物馆).

Her first book Kleine Sampan was translated into English, French, Italian and Dutch.

== Publications ==
Zhou published several books in Germany, among them:

- 1957 (first edition), Kleine Sampan by Verlag Sauerländer; OCLC Number: 73297188
- 1960, Zehn Jahre des Glücks, by Verlag Sauerländer; ISBN 3-7941-1649-6
- 1967, Der König des Baumes, Reutlingen
- 1968, Die kleinen bunten Fische, Reutlingen
- 1970, Kraniche, Bonn- Bad Godesberg (zusammen mit Ellen Schmidt-Bleibtreu)
- 1973, Aber ein Vogel gehört zum Himmel und ein Fisch gehört zum Wasser, Opladen
- 1974, Slave Gold Flower, by Opladen; ISBN 9783920337241
- 1983, Rot, rot muß es sein! Rund, rund muß es sein!, Stuttgart- Bad Cannstatt
