= Premier Sun =

Premier Sun may refer to:

- Sun Baoqi (1867–1931), Acting Premier of the Republic of China
- Sun Fo (1891–1973), 2nd Premier of the Republic of China
- Sun Yun-suan (1913–2006), 10th Premier of the Republic of China
