= Nora Hsiung Chu =

Chinese educator

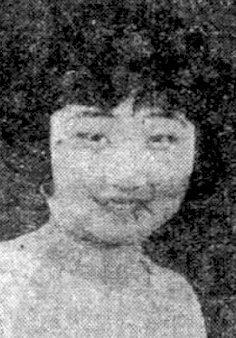
- Nora Hsiung as a young student, from a 1923 newspaper
- Born: 1902; Hunan, Qing
- Died: 1977 (aged 74–75)
- Other names: Tze Hsiung Chu, Chih Hsiung, Chu Hsiung-chih, N. T. H. Chu, Xiong Zhi, Nora Xiong
- Education: Barnard College (BA); Columbia University (MA)
- Occupation: educator
- Children: 5
- Parent: Xiong Xiling

Nora Tze Hsiung Chu (1902 – 1977) was a Chinese educator. As secretary general of the National Association for Refugee Children in the 1940s, she oversaw dozens of orphanages and programs for child refugees in China.

== Early life ==
Hsiung was born in Hunan province in 1902 (some sources give 1900 as the date), the daughter of Chinese philanthropist and politician Hsiung Shi-ling (Xiong Xiling). Her mother, Chu Ch'i-hui (Zhu Qihui), was a leader of women's and charitable organizations. After her mother died in 1931, her father married Mao Yen-wen (1898–1999).

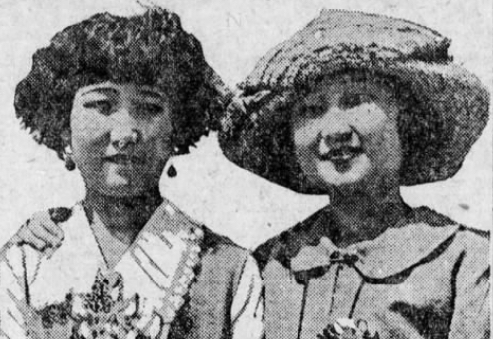
Nora and Rose Hsiung, from a 1922 newspaper.

Nora Hsiung and her sister Rose were educated in the United States. Nora attended Mount Ida School, Mount Holyoke College and Barnard College. While in Boston, she was in the cast of two short plays produced by Chinese students to benefit Chinese relief work. While she was in New York City, she was photographed doing carpentry ahead of the 1925 Oriental Bazaar, a benefit for the Cathedral of St. John the Divine. She received a bachelor's degree at Barnard in 1926; she also earned a master's degree in 1927 from Teachers College Columbia University.

== Career ==
On her return to China, Nora Hsiung Chu served on the staff of the National College of Rural Reconstruction. She toured European and American child welfare programs and gave a series of lectures in China about what she found, and how Western ideas might be adapted for Chinese use.

In 1942, Chu became secretary general of the National Association for Refugee Children, an organization directed by Soong Mei-ling and based in Chongqing during and after World War II. Chu was responsible for overseeing dozens of orphanages, schools, and programs for child refugees. She was described as "the leading Chinese child-welfare specialist" after she chaired a national conference in Shanghai in 1946. She went to the United Kingdom on a United Nations fellowship in 1949.

Chu was living in Taiwan when she served on the United Nations Commission on the Status of Women when it met in Geneva, Switzerland in 1956. Later that year, she crossed the United States, visiting educators in New York City, Washington, D.C., Cincinnati, West Lafayette, Berkeley, and Seattle along the way. In 1967, Chu attended the World Girl Guide Association meeting in Canada. She participated in the Regional Meeting of Teacher Educators in Asia, held in The Philippines in 1969.

== Personal life ==
Nora Hsiung married Chu Ling (also known as Lynn Chu), a Chinese air force officer. They had five children; four of their children lived their adult lives in the United States, and the fifth lived in Taiwan. Her husband was director of the Astronautical Society of the Republic of China, and was involved in international meetings on the "peaceful uses of space". She died in 1977, aged 75 years.

Her younger sister, Rose Hsiung, married British author Robert Payne in 1942; they divorced in 1951. Her granddaughter Linda Hsiung Dech was a founder of the Minnesota Breastfeeding Coalition, and in 2019 became executive director of the Minnesota Milk Bank for Babies.
