= Kaiping Mines =

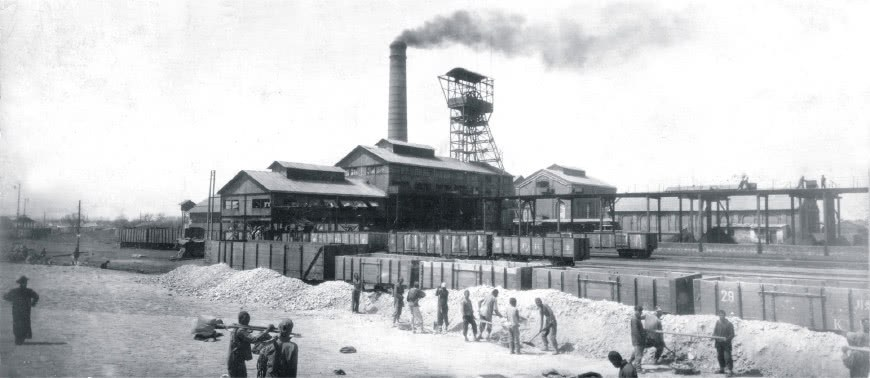
Tangshan Mine

The Kaiping Mines (开平煤矿 "Kaiping Coal Mine") was one of the first modern mining companies in Zhili, China. It was founded by Li Hongzhang and production began in 1881. During this period of the mines (1881-1912) at times the annual coal production reached 1,400,000 tons. One of the principals was Zhou Xuexi and the chief engineer was Herbert Hoover.

During the course of the Boxer Rebellion, to protect them from foreign occupation, and with the cooperation of Hoover and British financial interests, the mines passed to the Anglo-Belgian Chinese Engineering & Mining Company. The Luanzhou (Lanchou, Lanchow) Mining Company was formed in 1908 under Yuan Shikai to pressure the British to come to terms and return the mines to Chinese control. However the Chinese Engineering & Mining Company emerged on top during the ensuing price war and in 1912 the two companies would agree to the formation of the Kailan (Kailuan) Mining Administration to manage the mines on behalf of both companies.

The Kailan Mines were seen by Matsunaga Yasuzaemon in 1918. Today it's called Kailuan Group.
