= William Orr Leitch =

Scottish civil engineer involved with building the Peking-Mukden railway

William Orr Leitch FRSE FRSGS MICE (d.1948) was a Scottish civil engineer responsible for building sections of the Peking-Mukden railway and consequently serving as both its Chief Engineer and Manager. He was involved in the Mukden Incident of 1931.

== Life ==
Little is known of his early life other than that he was "from Edinburgh".

In 1937 he was elected a Fellow of the Royal Society of Edinburgh. His proposers were Gilbert MacIntyre Hunter, Douglas Guthrie, Alfred Henry Roberts, and Sir Thomas Hudson Beare.

He died on 27 January 1948.

== Family ==
He married Katherine MacIntyre, sister of Major Hugh Ross MacIntyre DSO Mc and bar.

== Publications ==
- Railway Construction in North China (1905)
