= Zhou Fu =

Chinese politician (1837–1921)

- 周馥

Assistant Grand Secretary
- In office July 4, 1917 – July 12, 1917
- Monarch: Xuantong Emperor
- Prime Minister: Zhang Xun

Viceroy of Liangguang
- In office 1906–1907
- Monarch: Guangxu Emperor
- Preceded by: Cen Chunxuan
- Succeeded by: Zhang Renjun

Viceroy of Liangjiang
- In office 1904–1906
- Monarch: Guangxu Emperor
- Preceded by: Li Xingrui
- Succeeded by: Duanfang

Governor of Shantung Province
- In office 1902–1904
- Monarch: Guangxu Emperor

Personal details
- Born: December 16, 1837 Anhui
- Died: September 21, 1921 (aged 83) Tianjin
- Citizenship: Qing Empire
- Relations: Zhou Shutao (grandchildren)
- Children: Zhou Xuexi (fourth son)

Zhou Fu (Chinese: 周馥; Wade–Giles: Chou Fu, also romanised as Chow Fuh; 20 December 1837 – 21 October 1921) was a Han Chinese official of the late Qing dynasty. He was Viceroy of Liangjiang in 1904–1906 and Viceroy of Liangguang in 1906–1907, respectively.

He began his career as an army secretary at Li Hongzhang's camp (Huai Army) in Anqing, Anhui province during the Taiping Rebellion, who served Li the longest, from 1860 to Li's death in 1901. In 1902 he became governor of Shantung Province. The New York Times described him as "able and progressive" and noted his "pro-foreign views".
