= Kailuan Group =

Chinese coal mining company

The Kailuan (Group) Co., Ltd. (Chinese: 开滦(集团)有限责任公司) is a major Chinese coal mining company. The Chinese Engineering and Mining Company was its predecessor.

In 2009, Kailuan Group planned to build a coal reserve base on the northeast coast to store 50 million tonnes of the fossil fuel. As one of the world's largest coal consumers and producers, it has set up four to six coal reserve bases, each with a storage capacity of more than 20 million tonnes, in eastern Shandong province to help cope with future supply shocks. The base planned by Kailuan would be located in the Caofeidian area of Hebei province and would cost an estimated 2 billion yuan ($294 million). No timeframe has been provided.

The state-run coal mining group is the parent of Kailuan Energy Chemical (SSE: 600997).

In 2012, Kailuan Group announced a 30% stake in a joint venture steel project with Jingtang United Iron & Steel from Tangshan. However, the deal collapsed.

== See also ==
- Coal power in China
- Zhou Xuexi
