= Zhou Shutao =

Chinese book collector and industrialist

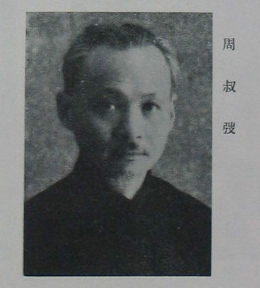
Zhou Shutao

Zhou Shutao (Chinese: 周叔弢; July 18, 1891, Yangzhou – February 14, 1984, Tianjin) was a collector of rare books, an industrialist, and the deputy mayor of Tianjin.

== His names ==
Zhou was born Zhou Mingyang (周明扬), then changed to Zhou Mingxian (周名暹). Shutao was his courtesy name (字), that he primarily used. He also used an alternate name taken at older art name (晚号): Shuweng (弢翁).

== Early life ==
Zhou was home schooled since 5 years-old in Yangzhou, and collected books from 1912 until 1984.

== Private life ==
He was the major figure and shareholder in his uncle Zhou Xuexi's Business empire. A successful industrialist in his own right, he managed Huzxin Textile Co. (华新纺织公司) and Qixin Cement Co. (Wade–Giles: Chee Hsin; Chinese: 启新洋灰).

== Public life ==
Due to his favorable view of the communist party and cooperation, he was appointed the first deputy mayor of Tianjin municipality in 1950. Since then, he was elected or appointed to numerous organizations that included:

- Vice-Chairman of the CPPCC Committee (政协委员会副主席)
- Standing Committee of the National People's Congress (全国人民代表大会常务委员会委员)
- Vice-Chairman of the National Federation of Industry (全国工商业联合会副主席)
- Director of CITIC Group Tianjin (天津市国际信托投资公司董事)

== Book collection ==
He began to collect books in 1912 and to donate in 1949. He accumulated more than 37,000 books, of which 2,672 were rare. He collected Chinese and foreign, dating back to Song dynasty. He donated the entire rare book collection (善本书) to National Library of China in 1952. His other books, Chinese and foreign, thread - bound (线装) to Tianjin Library and Nankai University.

== Publications ==
- 1984, Selected donated seals of Zhou Shutao, Zhou Shutao xian sheng juan xian xi yin xuan (周叔弢先生捐献玺印选; Tianjin yi shu bo wu guan)
- 1985, Index of his rare book Zi zhuang yan kan shanben shumu (自庄严堪善本书目) Tianjin: Guji Chubanshe; #17330.1

== Family ==
Zhou had three wives and ten children. He's the younger brother of M. D. Chow.
