= Kaiping Tramway and Imperial Railways of North China =

Early Chinese railway

The first 1,435 mm (4 ft 8 1/2 in) standard gauge railway to be built and survive in China was the Kaiping (開平) colliery tramway located at Tangshan in Hebei province. However, this was not the very first railway in China. An earlier attempt to introduce railways had been made in 1876 when the short Shanghai to Wusong 762 mm (2 ft 6 in) narrow gauge line known as the "Woosung Road Company" was built but then pulled up within less than two years because of Chinese government opposition.

== History ==
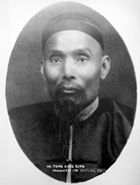
Tong King-sing

Cantonese merchant Tong King-sing (唐景星 a.k.a. Tang Ting-shu 唐廷樞) was a Hong Kong Government interpreter who later became Jardine Matheson & Company’s head comprador at Shanghai. In 1878 Tong, who was then Director-General of the China Merchants' Steam Navigation Company, commenced coal mining operations in the Kaiping district with the backing of the powerful Viceroy of Zhili Li Hongzhang.

The first shaft was sunk at Tongshan in 1879 by the new Chinese Engineering and Mining Company (CEMC) under the direction of English mining engineer Robert Reginald Burnett, MICE. To transport coal from the mine to ships on the river at Beitang entailed carrying it a distance of nearly 30 miles; Tong King Sing attempted to gain permission to build a railway for this purpose, but was not able .

=== The Lutai Canal ===
Initially a canal was constructed from Lutai (Note: Chinese: 蘆台/芦台; pinyin: Lutai) on the river to Hsukochuang (Note: simplified Chinese: 胥各庄; traditional Chinese: 胥各莊; pinyin: Xugezhuang; Wade–Giles: Hsukochuang) the furthest point that the canal could physically extend. The CEMC's Managing Director, Tong, eventually received permission for the last seven miles to the Tongshan colliery to be covered by a mule-pulled “tramway”, and English civil engineer Claude William Kinder was employed for its construction, which was completed in 1881.

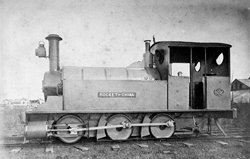
The Rocket of China

Kinder insisted on building the tramway to the international Standard gauge of 1,435 mm (4 ft 8 1/2 in), to make sure the tramway could be turned into a full railway. He also set about constructing a steam locomotive using the boiler and other parts from a portable steam winding engine borrowed from the colliery. After word had leaked out about its construction, the engine had to be concealed for several weeks until Viceroy Li Hung Chang gave word for the construction to continue. The result of Kinder's efforts came to fruition on 9 June 1881 when the home-made 2-4-0 tank engine christened “Rocket of China” entered service on the tramway.

=== The first imported locomotives ===
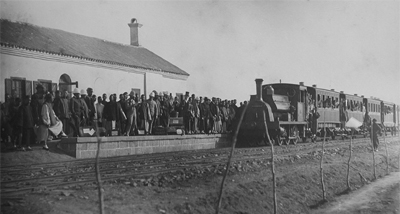
Stevenson tank locomotive No. 3 with train near Xugezhuang station c. 1882

The introduction of “Rocket” was highly successful and in June 1882 two 0-6-0 tank locomotives were ordered from Robert Stephenson & Co., Newcastle. They arrived in October and were given running numbers 2 and 3. These were the first two standard gauge locomotives imported into China. While some sources claim that an 0-4-0 engine numbered “0” now preserved in the Beijing Locomotive Museum was the first engine imported into China, this is unlikely to be accurate.

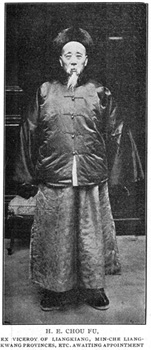
Chou Fu

=== The first extension to Lutai ===
While the Kaiping mine railway maintained operations, the Imperial Court's opposition to railway development in China prevented any further development for several years. But because the canal would become covered with ice during the winter months, the mining company succeeded in 1886 in gaining permission to extend the tramway all the way to Lutai. The extension was carried out by a newly formed Kaiping Railway Company (Kaiping Tiehlu Gongsi 開平鐵路公司 s:开平铁路公司), separately funded from the mining company, chaired by the Tientsin Taotai (Tianjin daotai 天津 道台) Chou Fu (Zhou Fu 周馥). The managing director was Wu Tingfang, who had studied law in England and was also interpreter and secretary to Li Hung Chang.

Assisted by the young American-educated student engineer (a Yung Wing mission student), Kwang King Yang (Kuang Jingyang 鄺景揚 s: 邝景扬 ) also known as K.Y. Kwong and Kuang Sunmou, Kinder supervised the building of the extension which was completed in April 1887. Imported German Krupp rails were used, as well as a ten-wheeled 2-6-2 saddle-tank locomotive from the Grant Locomotive Works of New Jersey (No.4), and forty 10-ton coal wagons.

=== Second extension to Dagu and Tianjin ===
Soon afterward, Viceroy Li pressed for a further extension to Beitang and Taku for military purposes. Kinder was called upon to survey the route. Li had to overcome opposition in the Imperial Court but gained sanction for the line to be extended 50 miles to Tianjin. Kinder, as Chief Engineer of the now newly named China Railway Company, was then permitted to secure the services of several more foreign engineers which included Resident Engineers A.W.H. Bellingham and W. Watson. The whole project was completed within fourteen months, with limited train services commencing in August 1888. This period of railway development was not smooth sailing, and there was continued opposition to the railway on a number of fronts. At various times there were organized riots against the railway and in one instance thousands of dollars' worth of damage was done to mining equipment at the Tongshan colliery when a violent feud erupted between Cantonese and northern Chinese workers. Another severe blow was China's first-recorded serious train accident on 25 March 1889 when there was a head-on collision between two trains at Chung Liang Cheng (Junliangcheng 軍糧城 s: 军粮城). English train driver, M. Jarvis, had waited a long time in the station passing loop and impatiently entered the next section of single track before the arrival of an oncoming train. As a result of the collision, four carriages caught fire and several injured people were burned alive. Driver Dawson survived but the offending driver, Jarvis, one fireman and seven passengers died in the crash, while more died several days later from their burns and injuries. It was alleged by junior staff that Jarvis had been drinking heavily before the crash. Further troubles came weeks later, in April 1888, when a newly completed steel bridge across the Pei Ho river (today's Haihe 海河) in the heart of Tientsin, connecting with the foreign settlements, caused unrest with local boatmen fearful that the railway would harm their interests. Li ordered the destruction of the bridge by dynamite, causing the company a loss of £8000 and many months work.

=== Towards Beijing and Shanhaiguan ===
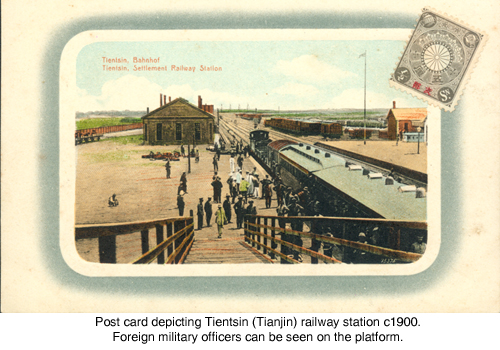
Tiantsin railway station with foreign military officers at 1900

Shortly after the completion of the Tientsin section pressure was exerted for permission to build extensions westwards to Beijing and northeastwards towards the Great Wall. Imperial Court opposition prevented the western extension but the northern extension was sanctioned and reached Guye in late 1890, Lanchou in 1892 and Shanhaiguan in 1893, during which period the line was transferred to the control of a newly formed Imperial Chinese Railway Administration.

During this period of expansion, Jeme Tien Yow joined the railway company in 1888 as a cadet engineer under Kinder's supervision. Kinder appreciated the talents of this Yale-graduated engineer and Jeme was soon promoted first to resident and then district engineer. In all, Jeme spent 12 years working on various sections of this railway. He later achieved international recognition as the Engineer-in-Chief who built the Imperial Peking-Kalgan Railway without any foreign assistance.

=== Further northwards into Manchuria ===
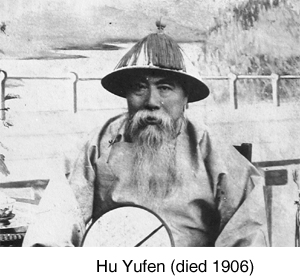
Hu Yufen

Plans to continue the railway North-eastwards beyond Shan Hai Kuan (Shanhaiguan) to Jinzhou, Shenyang and Jilin were prevented by lack of funds and because of war between Japan and China (August 1894 to March 1895). By 1896 the rails had only reached Chung Ho So (pinyin: Zhonghesuo 中河所), some 40 miles beyond Shan Hai Kuan. China's loss of the war with Japan brought about Li Hung Chang's disgrace and virtual removal from power, and with this came new management. After a short power struggle between rival factions Sheng Hsuan Huai (pinyin: Sheng Xuanhuai succeeded in gaining control of this new organization and appointed his own supporters to the directorate of whom the most prominent of these was Hu Yu-fen who was appointed Director-General and made responsible for the all sections of the “Northern” Railway and the name evolved yet again in 1897 into “Imperial Railways of North China”

=== A Peking (Beijing) terminus at Ma Chia Pu (Majiabao) ===
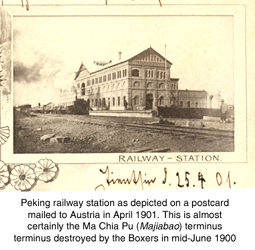
Ma Chia Pu terminus before June 1900

During the period 1898-9 a British loan of £2,300,000 was negotiated and an issue of bonds raised in London for the purpose of extending this line northwards to Xinmin and a branch line from Koupangtzu to Yingkou. The loan was arranged by the British and Chinese Corporation, a joint venture and front for the Hongkong and Shanghai Banking Corporation and Jardine Matheson and Company. In spite of objections from the Russians — who were themselves busy grabbing control of Chinese territory in Manchuria (incl. the Chinese Eastern Railway) — the line to Chinchou was eventually completed in 1899. Back at the western end of the railway the line had reached Fengtai and shortly afterwards a new Ma Chia Pu terminus outside Peking in 1897 from where a Siemens built electric tramway was laid to the city's South Gate, or Yongdingmen, which opened for service in 1899.

=== Boxer Destruction ===
The next set-back for the railway was the Boxer Uprising of 1900 which brought a complete halt to railway construction progress and also resulted in large sections of the existing railway in around Peking and Tientsin being totally wrecked by the Boxers. This included the killing of the railway's recently appointed new Managing-Director, Hsu Ching Cheng (pinyin: Xu Jingcheng 許景澄) who was dragged out of his office and executed by pro-Boxer Court hardliners for being “too pro foreign”. Hsu had replaced the previous Director, Hu Yu-fen in early 1899 after a palace coup in late 1898 which saw the Empress Dowager Cixi suppress the reformist young Guangxu Emperor and grab power back into her own hands.

=== Foreign military administration 1900 - 1902 ===
Following the relief of the besieged foreign legations in Peking by an international allied expeditionary force the Chinese government lost control of what remained of the badly damaged railway system for a two-year period of allied foreign occupation. British and other foreign military units repaired the line between Tientsin and Peking (1900–1902) and the railway was also extended from the Ma Chiu Pu terminus to new Peking stations. The first was adjacent to the Temple of Heaven and a gap was made in the outer city wall for this purpose next to the Yung Ting Men gatehouse.

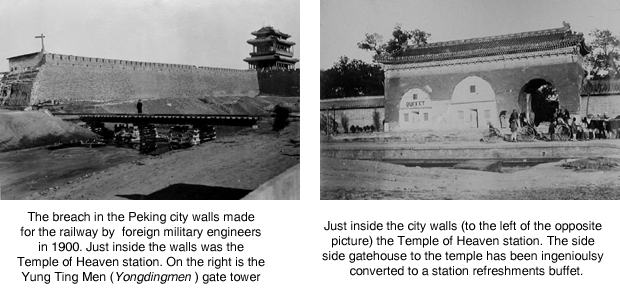

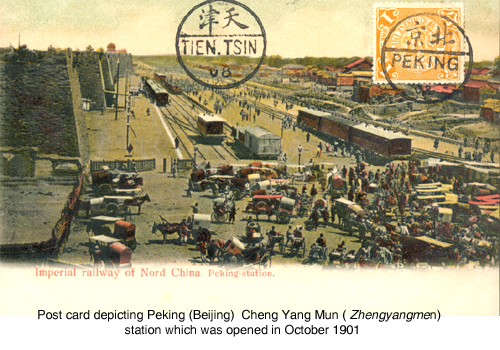
Cheng Yang Mun station

A few months later the foreign military authorities decided to take the railway even closer to central Peking and extended the line to near the front gate of the Tartar city at Zhengyangmen as well as the addition of a branch line eastwards to Tongzhou. Also during this period of foreign military control a small port was developed at Qinhuangdao with a six-mile branch line joining the main line a few miles southwest of Shan Hai Kuan at Tangho. This port, which had been used for landing allied military personnel and supplies, was later turned over to and further developed by the Chinese Engineering & Mining Co.

For two years (1900–1902) the railway was placed under the overall command of a British army “Royal Engineers” contingent which used the name “British Railway Administration” (BRA) for the purposes of operating the line as far north as Shan Hai Kuan. From this point the Russians retained control of the line northwards until the whole line was handed back to the Imperial Chinese authorities on 29 September 1902. During the BRA period the railway operated a travelling post office train and a special overprinted Chinese postal stamp was introduced for mailing letters carried by the BRA's express mail trains.

=== Return to Chinese control 1902 ===
After civilian control of the railway was resumed in late 1902, Claude Kinder was reinstated as Chief Engineer and also given additional and more powerful responsibilities as General Manager. Strongman Yuan Shikai had himself appointed as Director-General of Railways and Kinder's former boss, Hu Yu-fen, who had been ousted in 1899, came back to power as the Assistant Director-General. The Chinese railway administration also had the services of a bright Western-educated new Secretary, returned Chinese Educational Mission student Liang Ju Hao (pinyin: Liang Ruhao 梁汝浩), better known to Europeans as M.T. Liang.

=== Reaching Mukden (Shenyang) ===
During the spring of 1903 construction on the Manchurian extension resumed and by the autumn had reached Hsin Min Tung (Xinming) which initially served as the IRNC's northern terminus for Mukden (Shenyang). During the Russo-Japanese War of 1904-5 the Japanese laid a military narrow gauge line from Hsin Min Tung to Mukden in their bid to oust the Russians. In 1907 this extension was purchased by Imperial Railways of North China and in 1909 the line up-graded to standard gauge with Japanese assistance. The IRNC terminus was later moved to Mukden proper and eventually shared the impressive Shenyang railway terminus which was constructed 1909–1910 by the Japanese South Manchuria Railway. By this time the railway was generally referred to as the ‘Peking-Mukden Railway’

=== Claude William Kinder 1852 - 1936 (Engineer-in-Chief) ===
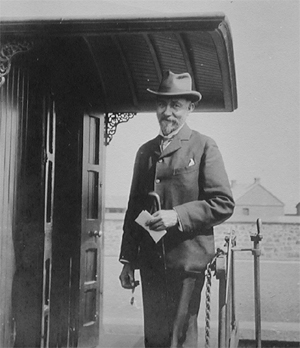

Claude William Kinder does not receive very much mention in Chinese historic sources, perhaps because of China's intense sensitivity to the part played by foreigners in China during this period. Kinder, however, played a crucial role in the early development of this first railway. He detested the power struggles and political squabbles between the numerous railway's directors that he worked under but from the point of view of being a reliable and steady man at the helm on the ground, he got on with the job of building and operating the railway while his superiors jostled for power and “played musical chairs”. Kinder worked for the Chinese railway for 31 years as Engineer-in-Chief and also later General Manager of the progressively developing IRNC before resigning in May 1909 following a difference of opinion with a new Director-General.

Hu Yu-fen, with whom Kinder had in later years enjoyed a cordial relationship, died in 1906 and this led to the appointment in 1907 of a Yuan Shi Kai's protégé, Liang Shi Yi as the head of a newly created Chief Railway Bureau. Liang in turn appointed independent directors for each of China's different railway lines, which included the IRNC. Within months Kinder had huge differences of opinion with Liang and in particular over the engagement and dismissal of foreign engineers. Unable to reconcile these differences, Kinder submitted his resignation in October 1908 following the termination of three foreign engineers without Liang even consulting Kinder. Kinder left China on retirement in 1909 and never returned.

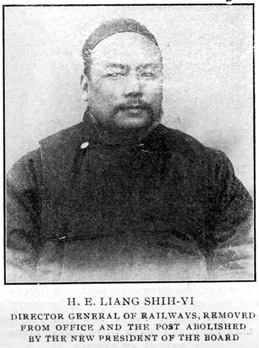

Kinder was appointed C.M.G. by the British in 1900 and in 1905 was created a “Mandarin of the Red Button” (Chinese Official Rank of the Second Class) for meritorious service by the Imperial Chinese Government. He was also awarded the “Order of the Double Dragon” (Shuang long bao xing 雙龍寶星s: 双龙宝星). In a display of growing local nationalism, Liang also snubbed Kinder's recommendation for his Deputy Chief Engineer (Alex Cox) to be promoted as his replacement and chose instead Englishman A. Harvey Bellingham who was then Municipal Engineer for Tientsin. Bellingham, however, died suddenly before taking up the appointment, whereupon Liang leap-frogged a more junior engineer over the head of Cox, as a continuing snub to Kinder.

There was much public criticism in the foreign press about Kinder's supposedly shabby treatment by Liang, and Kinder retired to England a bitter man having been given no customary “golden handshake” for thirty years service. He was also denied payment for some 18 months in unpaid leave pay accumulated over many years. He was eventually offered a compensatory position of engineering adviser, resident in England but declined the offer. He died in Churt, England on August 9, 1935. The railway that Kinder and Tong Kong Sing had started however continued to prosper and after the fall of the Imperial Qing dynasty in 1911, the railway formed part of “Chinese National Railways”
