= Rocket of China (locomotive) =

Rocket of China 中国火箭号
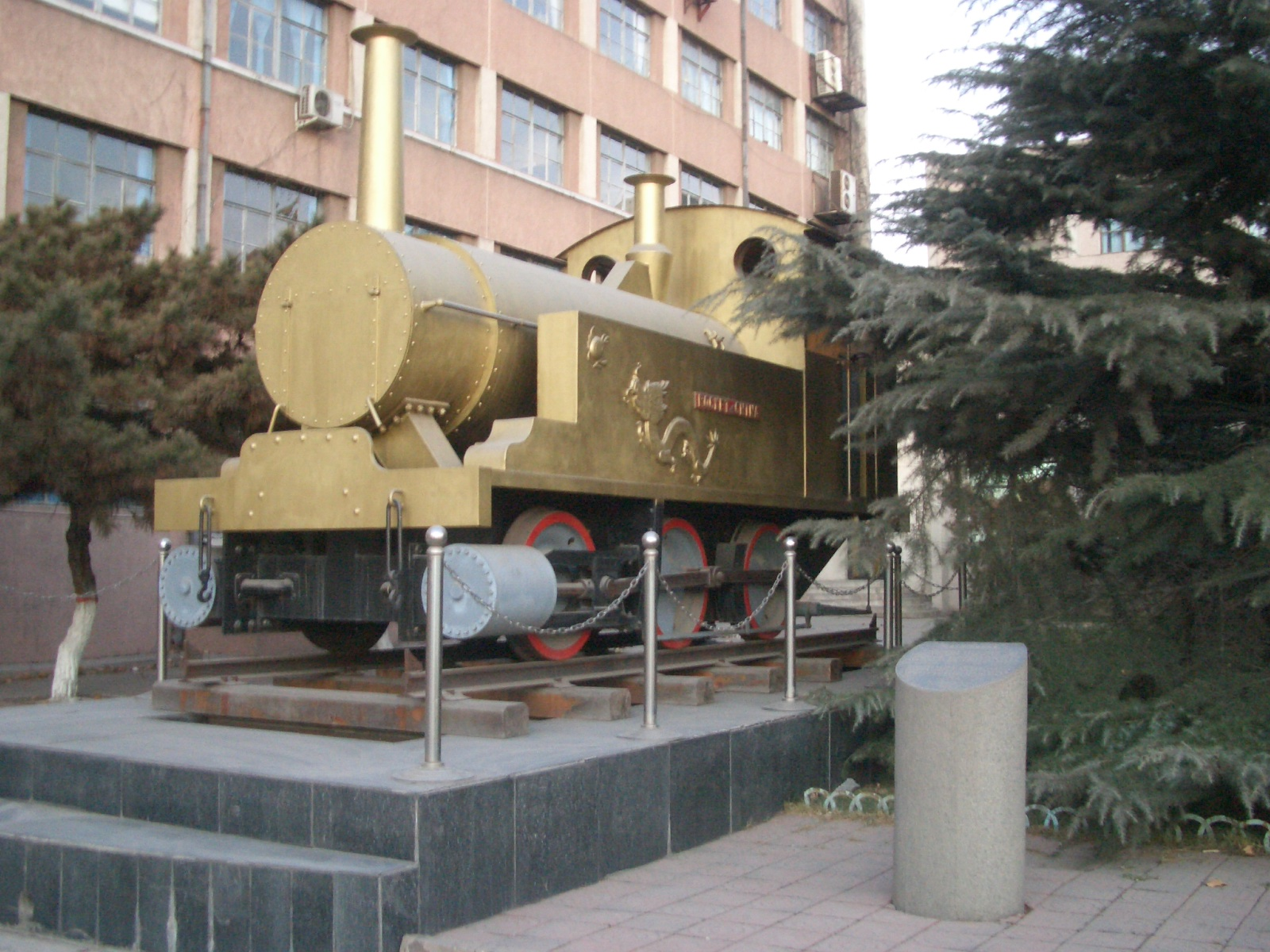
- A replica of the "China Rocket" steam locomotive at the Tangshan Locomotive and Rolling Stock Works
Type and origin
- Power type: Steam
- Designer: Claude W. Kinder
- Builder: Xugezhang Works
- Build date: 1882
Specifications
- Configuration
  - Whyte: 2-4-0T
- Gauge: 1,435 mm (4 ft 8 1/2 in)
- Length: 5,700 mm (220 in)
Performance figures
- Maximum speed: 32 km/h (20 mph)
Career
- Nicknames: Dragon Locomotive
- Disposition: Lost in war

The Rocket of China (Chinese: 中国火箭号) was one of the earliest steam locomotives built by Chinese railways, and is sometimes considered the first domestically-built steam locomotive in China. Because of the metal dragon pattern inlaid on the body of the locomotive, it is also called the "Dragon Locomotive".

== Design and history ==
In 1882, the coal production of the Kaiping Coal Mines increased sharply, and mules and horses struggled to transport loads efficiently, so large quantities were left in stockpiles. In order to solve the problem of traction power, the Xugezhuang Works, according to the locomotive plans provided by Claude W. Kinder, used a Portable winding engine boiler and steel materials used in mine development to assemble China's first steam locomotive under the guidance of Kinder. The wife of R.R. Burnett, the British chief engineer of the Kaiping Mining Bureau, named this locomotive "Rocket of China" after the Rocket designed by George Stephenson in 1829. According to historical records, this locomotive was 18 feet 8 inches (about 5.7 meters) long, with only three pairs of driving wheels, but no guide wheels or trailing wheels. Because both sides of the locomotive were inlaid with a five-clawed flying dragon engraved in brass, representing the Qing Dynasty, this locomotive was also called the "Dragon Locomotive".

The fate of the original locomotive is disputed by several sources. According to Colin Garratt, Kinder buried the locomotive after it was found out by the Chinese authorities, who had sent a commission to investigate. On another account, Rocket of China was later placed in a museum and disappeared after 1937, during the onset of the Second Sino-Japanese War.

== Gallery ==
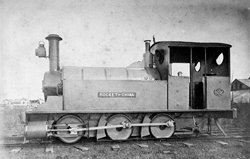
The "Rocket of China" in 1881

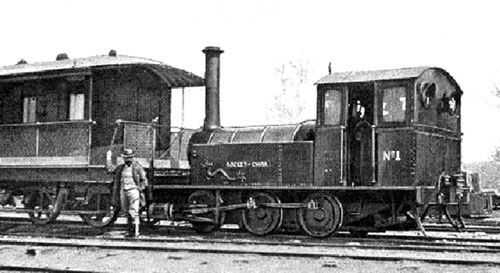
Claude W. Kinder poses with the "China Rocket" steam locomotive

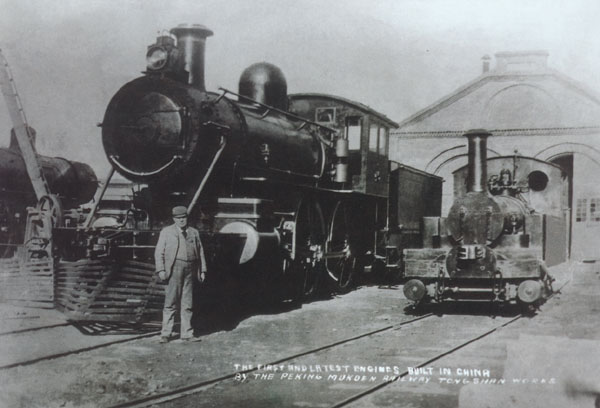
At the end of the 19th century, Jinda took a photo with the China Railways AM2 (left) and the Chinese Rocket (right) in the Xugezhuang repair factory.
