= Red Revenue =

Chinese stamps of the Qing Dynasty

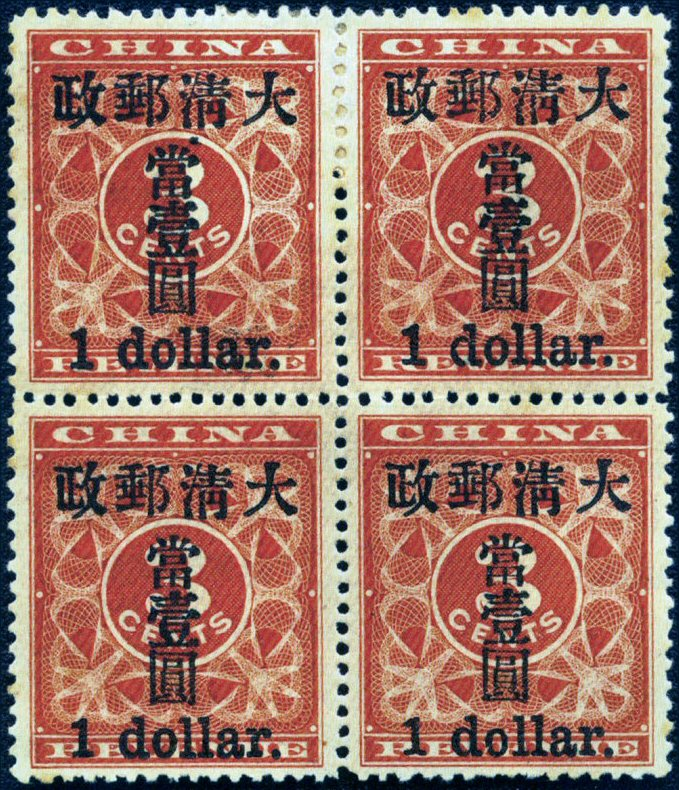
- Country of production: Chinese Qing dynasty
- Location of production: London
- Printer: Waterlow and Sons
- Face value: 3 cents (overprinted in five denominations)

Red Revenue
- Traditional Chinese: 紅印花郵票
- Simplified Chinese: 红印花邮票
- Literal meaning: red tax-stamp postage stamp
Transcriptions
Standard Mandarin
- Hanyu Pinyin: hóng yìnhuā yóupiào

The Red Revenues (Chinese: 紅印花郵票) are Qing dynasty Chinese revenue stamps that were overprinted (surcharged) to be used as postage stamps in 1897. Their limited number, fine design and the intaglio process made the stamps in this series some of the most sought after in the world.

There are several varieties of Red Revenue stamps, with the "Small One Dollar" being the rarest and most valuable. It has been called "China's rarest regularly issued stamp". In a 2013 Hong Kong auction, a single stamp was sold for HK$6.9 million. Another was sold in a 2013 Beijing auction for 7.22 million yuan. A block of four, considered the "crown jewel" of Chinese philately, was reportedly sold in 2009, together with a different stamp, for 120 million yuan (US$18.8 million).

== History ==
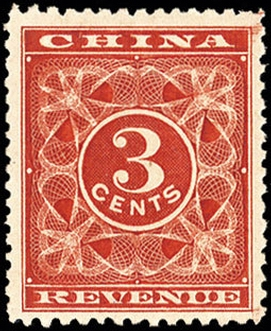
An original 3¢ Red Revenue stamp without the overprint

In January 1896, Censor Chen Pi of the Qing government petitioned the Guangxu Emperor to issue revenue stamps. The proof was submitted to Sir Robert Hart, the Inspector General of Customs, for approval. Of the revenue stamps ordered from England, only a portion of the 3¢ stamps was printed and shipped to China. They were stored in the Shanghai Customs Department. The 3¢ red revenue stamps were printed by Waterlow & Sons in London. The red symbolizes good luck and fortune in Chinese tradition.

On March 20, 1896, the Qing government approved the plan to establish a national postal service, under the supervision of the Customs Department. At the inauguration of the postal service in February 1897, the Coiling Dragon stamps ordered from Japan failed to arrive on time, hence the idling 3¢ red revenue stamps were overprinted to meet demand. There are five overprinted denominations: 1¢, 2¢, 4¢, $1 and $5.

== Small One Dollar ==
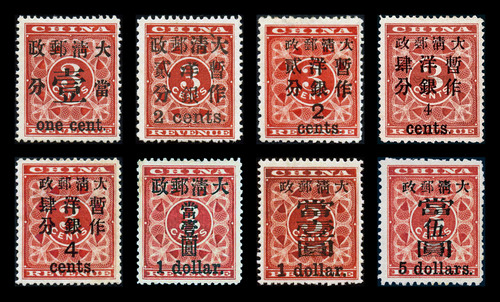
There are eight different overprints (in five denominations) on Red Revenue stamps.

Of the overprinted denominations, the $1 was made first. Because of complaints that the size of the overprinted Chinese characters was too small, only two panes (each with 25 stamps) were made before they were changed to larger characters. Owing to their rarity, the "Small One Dollar" stamps have become some of the most valuable stamps in the world. Only 32 are known to exist.

The crown jewel of the 32 surviving "Small One Dollar" stamps is the block of four, originally owned by R. A. de Villard who took it directly from the customs where he worked. M. D. Chow bought it from Villard's widow in 1927 for CN$3,500. It was sold to Allan Gokson (郭植芳) in 1947 for US$20,000, and Hong Kong banker and philatelist Lam Manyin (林文琰) bought it from Gokson's estate in 1982 for US$280,000. Shanghai real estate magnate Ding Jingsong (丁劲松) reportedly bought it from Lam in 2009, together with a Large Dragon stamp, for 120 million yuan (US$18.8 million).

== See also ==
- List of most expensive philatelic items
- Postage stamps and postal history of China
