= Mao Tse-tung: Ruler of Red China =

Book by Robert Payne

- First edition
- Author: Robert Payne
- Language: English
- Genre: Biographies
- Publisher: Henry Schuman
- Publication date: 1950
- Media type: Print (hardback book)
- ISBN: 978-1-4437-2521-7

Mao Tse-tung: Ruler of Red China is a book written by Robert Payne and published by Henry Schuman, New York in 1950, shortly after Mao Zedong (here his name is transliterated as Mao Tse-tung) came to power. Fifteen years before the Cultural Revolution, Payne anticipated Mao's wider interests:

Mao holds all the arts of China in his hands. Lenin had neither the learning nor the inclination to assume the role of transformer of culture. Mao, far more widely read and with a comparable subtlety of mind, has clearly determined to accept the position thrust on him, and no one can foresee the changes in the basic structure of Chinese culture which will derive ultimately from his will.

Though lacking some of the documents and details that were available in later years, the book discusses the party's history, including its foundation, in detail. In chapter three, Payne explains how Pravda in 1920 had wrongly reported the formation of the Chinese Communist Party. This was actually a conference consisting of a mixed bag of anarchists and non-Leninist socialists which “ended in a fiasco”.

A revised and updated edition was published in 1961 as Portrait of a Revolutionary: Mao Tse-tung. The original edition has been republished several times in recent years: as a paperback in 2007, as a hardback in 2008 and on Kindle in 2011.

== See also ==
- Mao Zedong
- Luding Bridge
- Chinese Communist Party
- Cultural Revolution
