= Robert Payne (author) =

English biographer and historian

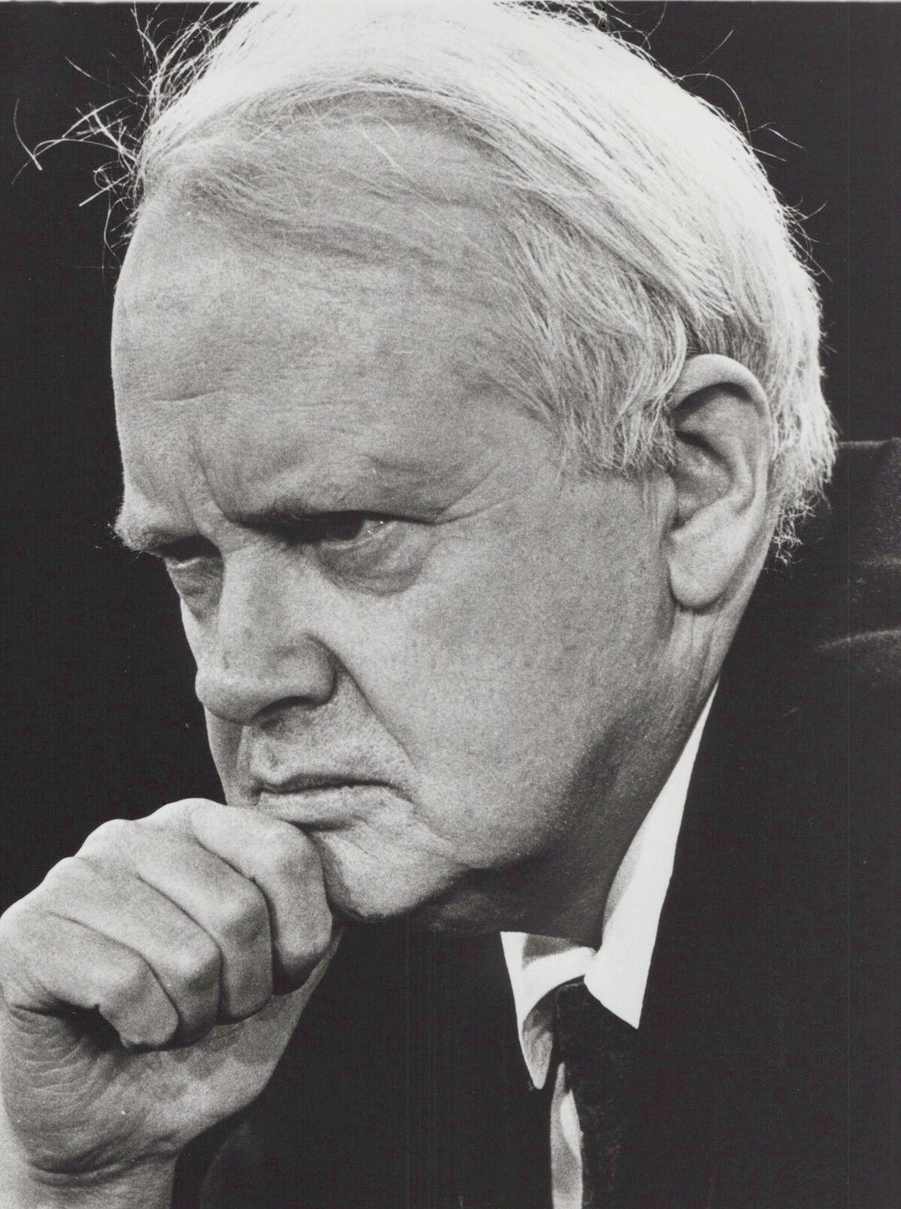
Payne in 1973

Pierre Stephen Robert Payne (4 December 1911 – 18 February 1983) was an English-born author, known principally for works of biography and history, although he also wrote novels, poetry, magazine articles and many other works. After working in Singapore and China, he moved to the United States in 1946 and became a professor of English literature. From 1954 onwards he lived as a writer in New York.

A prolific author, Payne is best known for his biographies of prominent historical figures, such as Leonardo da Vinci, Hitler, Stalin, Karl Marx, Lenin, Mao Zedong and Mahatma Gandhi, several of which were selected for Book of the Month Club. These works are praised for their readability and literary power, although not always for their historical rigour.

== Biography ==
=== Early life ===
Payne was born on 4 December 1911, at Saltash, Cornwall. He was the son of Stephen Payne, an English naval architect, and Mireille Louise Antonia (Dorey) Payne, originally from France. He was educated at St. Paul's School in London, the Diocesan College at Rondebosch and the University of Cape Town in South Africa, the University of Liverpool and the Ludwig-Maximilians-Universität München, and the University of Paris.

=== Career ===
As a young man Payne worked as a shipwright in England and then at the Singapore Naval Base, where he transferred to Army Intelligence. He worked in China between 1941 and 1946, as cultural attaché to the British Embassy and as a teacher at Fuhtan University at Chongqing and at Lianda University, Kunming. While in China he became a friend of Joseph Needham. In 1946, Payne met and interviewed Mao Zedong in Yenan, providing background for his 1950 work Mao Tse-tung: Ruler of Red China. During the interview, Mao correctly predicted that it would take only a year and half for the Communist forces to conquer China after the armistice with Chiang Kai-shek and his followers was broken.

Payne moved to the United States in 1946 and from 1949-54 was Professor of English and author in residence at Alabama College, Montevallo. He became a US citizen in 1953 and settled in New York City in 1954, devoting himself to writing and shifting his focus in part from novels and poetry to biography. He was chairman of the Translation Committee of PEN International, and in 1976 co-founded the Translation Center at Columbia University. He edited The Russian Library series for Washington Square Press. He died in Bermuda on 18 February 1983.

=== Marriages ===
Payne married Rose Hsiung, daughter of Hsiung Hse-ling, a former prime minister of China, in 1942. They divorced in 1951. He married Sheila Lalwani in 1981.

== Writing ==
Early writing by Payne included two novels, The War in the Marshes and The Mountain and the Stars. He also reported for newspapers on the Spanish Civil War and from China on the war with Japan. While in China he also wrote autobiographical works, historical novels, and worked on The White Pony, a compilation of Chinese poetry.

A "workaholic" who often produced several books within a year, Payne wrote over 100 published books, including novels, histories and biographies. He was best known for the biographies, which included studies of Charlie Chaplin, Greta Garbo, Hitler, Lenin, Stalin, Trotsky, Gandhi, Albert Schweitzer, Dostoyevsky, Ivan the Terrible, Chiang Kai-shek, Karl Marx, Mao Zedong, Sun Yat-sen, André Malraux, Shakespeare, Alexander the Great, the White Rajahs of Sarawak and General George C. Marshall. Some of his works were Book of the Month Club selections: these were The Life and Death of Adolf Hitler and The Life and Death of Lenin as Main Selections; The Gold of Troy as a Dual Selection; The Life and Death of Mahatma Gandhi and The World of Art as Alternate Selections, and The Rise and Fall of Stalin and The Dream and the Tomb as other selections.

Payne's biographies were sometimes informed by his personal encounters with his subjects. Payne had actually met Hitler in 1937 in Munich at the Hotel Vierjahreszeiten at the invitation of Rudolf Hess. As Payne recounted in his book "Eyewitness", Hitler offered him a strawberry cream cake. Payne also dined and had long conversations with Mao Zedong in 1946.

As a novelist, Payne used the pseudonyms Richard Cargoe, John Anthony Devon, Howard Horne, Valentin Tikhonov, and Robert Young. In 1954, he published a pastiche novella, The Deluge, as Leonardo da Vinci; the book was mostly Payne's writing, incorporating "fragmentary da Vinci notes." He also performed translations into English from many languages, including works by Pasternak and Kierkegaard.

Payne contributed many articles to leading magazines including The New York Times Magazine, United Nations World and Saturday Review. The New York Times and Saturday Review frequently featured book reviews by him.

Many of Payne's better-known works have been re-published in digital form by the British publisher Endeavour Press. World rights to all works by Payne are handled by David Higham Associates, London, U.K.

Francis Ford Coppola, who was the co-screenwriter of the award-winning 1970 film Patton, lifted almost verbatim the last words of the film from the first paragraph of Payne's book The Roman Triumph, ending with the phrase, "all glory is fleeting." Payne received no screen credit for this contribution.

=== Critical reaction ===
Payne was described in 1947 as "a poet and a believer in the permanent power of beauty", and as a "young English author whose versatility and prolific output have astonished the literary world". The New York Times in 1950 called him "the most versatile writer of the year". Orville Prescott, book reviewer for the New York Times, claimed that "No man alive can write more beautiful prose than Robert Payne."

Payne's biography of Hitler was seen as attempting to "humanize the inhuman Hitler". The American critic Christopher Lehmann-Haupt wrote that the effect of this approach was "interesting and terrifying". The historian Alan Bullock commented that Payne's focus on Hitler's personal life resulted in a good account of Hitler's earlier years, but proved less productive for his later life when he "becomes absorbed in politics". The Biography Book recognised the "narrative and imaginative power" of Payne's account, while stating that "it incorporates speculation as fact". One example of this was the book's acceptance of claims by Bridget Dowling (Hitler's sister-in-law) and others that Hitler had spent time in Liverpool before 1914, a claim later - and, in view of Payne's personal meeting in Munich with Hitler in 1937, albeit speculatively - described as "conclusively disproved".

Payne was said to be "a firm adherent to the conspiracy theory of politics" and among biographies of Lenin, Payne's book was described as "the easiest to read ... also the easiest to forget". The Los Angeles Times commented on the Leonardo biography that "Payne makes a persuasive case ... The biography is ... a rendering of respect and admiration for the man."

== Bibliography ==
=== Biographies ===
- Sun Yat-Sen: a Portrait, Asia Press (1946).
- Mao Tse-tung: Ruler of Red China (1950). Revised editions published as Portrait of a revolutionary: Mao Tse-tung (1961) and Mao Tse-tung (1969). All editions include an historical account of China from the Taiping Rebellion, but are centered around Mao's life and philosophy.
- The Marshall Story: A Biography of General George C. Marshall, Prentice-Hall (1951); republished as General Marshall: A Study in Loyalties, William Heinemann, Ltd. London (1952).
- The Great God Pan: A Biography of the Tramp Played by Charles Chaplin, Heritage House (1952); republished as The Great Charlie, Deutsch (1952).
- The Three Worlds of Albert Schweitzer, Thomas Nelson & Son (1957); republished as Schweitzer, Hero of Africa Hale (1958).
- The Life and Death of Lenin, Simon and Schuster (1964) (no ISBN).
- The Rise and Fall of Stalin, Simon and Schuster (1965).
- Marx, Simon and Schuster (1968). Library of Congress Catalog number 68-11014.
- The Life and Death of Mahatma Gandhi, E.P. Dutton (1969).
- Chiang Kai-shek, New York, Weybright and Talley (1969)
- A Portrait of André Malraux, Prentice-Hall (1970).
- The Life and Death of Adolf Hitler, Praeger (1973) LCCN 72-92891.
- Ivan the Terrible (co-authored with Nikita Romanoff), Crowell-Collier (1975). ISBN 0-690-00582-2.
- The Great Garbo, Praeger (1976).
- The Life and Death of Trotsky, McGraw-Hill (1977) (no ISBN).
- Leonardo (1978), a biography of Leonardo da Vinci in which Payne asserts that the Mona Lisa is a portrait of Isabella of Aragon and that the traditional chalk self-portrait of da Vinci is actually a portrait of his father.

=== Novels ===
- The Mountains and the Stars, William Heinemann, London (1938), published under the pseudonym Valentin Tikhonov.
- The War In The Marshes, Faber and Faber, London (1938), published under the pseudonym Robert Young. A political allegory influenced by Rex Warner.
- Love and Peace, William Heinemann, London (1945), the first of a series of novels describing the life of a Chinese family from 1908 to the present day; republished as Torrents of Spring, Dodd, Mead (1946).
- The Loard Comes: A Novel on the Life of Buddha, publisher W. Heinemann (1948).
- The Lovers, William Heinemann, London (1951), the second of a series of novels describing the life of a Chinese family from 1908 to the present day.
- Alexander the God, Wyn (1954); an abridged version was republished as Alexander and the Camp Follower, Elek (1961).
- Brave Harvest, Ballantine Books (1954), published under the pseudonym Richard Cargoe; republished as Harvest, William Heinemann, London (1955).
- A House in Peking, Doubleday (1956); republished as Red Jade, William Heinemann, London (1957).
- O Western Wind, Putnam, (1957), published under the pseudonym John Anthony Devon.
- The Barbarian and the Geisha, New American Library (1958) — Novelization of the screenplay by Ellis St. Joseph
- The Tormentors, Hillman (1959), original hardcover published under the pseudonym Richard Cargoe by William Sloane.
- The Back of the Tiger, Belmont Books (1961), published under the pseudonym Richard Cargoe.
- The Lord Jesus, Abelard-Schuman (1964).
- Caravaggio, A Novel, published by Little Brown and Company (1968). Library of Congress number 68-17272.
- The Tortured and The Damned, Horizon Press (1977).

=== History ===
- The Fathers of the Western Church, Viking (1951).
- Ancient Greece: The Triumph of a Culture, Norton (1964); also published as The Triumph of the Greeks, Hamish Hamilton (1964).
- The Christian Centuries: From Christ to Dante, W.W. Norton (1966).
- The Horizon Book of Ancient Rome, American Heritage Publishing Company (1966); republished as Ancient Rome, American Heritage Press (1970).
- Fortress, Simon and Schuster (1967).
- Massacre (The Tragedy of Bangladesh & the Phenomenon of Mass Slaughter Throughout History), Thompson Press (1973).
- The Dream and the Tomb A history of the Crusades. Cooper Square Press, originally published New York: Stein and Day (published posthumously in 1984).
- The Fathers of the Eastern Church, Dorset (1957) (ISBN 0-88029-404-3).

=== Other works ===
- Forever China (Dodd, Mead 1945) (Diaries 1941-44, includes Chungking Diary published by W. Heinemann (London, Toronto) (1945) (no ISBN)).
- The Granite Island, and other poems (Jonathan Cape, 1945)
- China Awake (Dodd, Mead 1947) Diaries continued.
- The Wanton Nymph: A Study of Pride published by William Heinemann, Ltd. London (1951) (no ISBN).
- Zero - The story of Terrorism published by Windgate London/New York in 1951.
- Red Lion Inn published by Prentice-Hall in 1951.
- The Deluge, Twayne 1954 (as Leonardo da Vinci) (no ISBN).
- A House in Peking Doubleday (1956) (no ISBN).
- The Holy Fire: The Story of the Early Centuries of the Christian Church in the Near East Harper, New York (1957)(ISBN 0-913836-61-3).
- The Splendor of Persia Knopf (New York), 1957.
- The Holy Sword Harper & Brothers (published in 1957; republished in 1987 under the title The History of Islam).
- The Gold of Troy - The story of Heinrich Schliemann and the buried cities of ancient Greece Funk & Wagnalls, NY (1959) Library of Congress catalog number 58-11361.
- Hubris: A Study of Pride Harper Torch Books NY (1960) (no ISBN), with an introduction by Sir Herbert Read, a revised paperback version of The Wanton Nymph: A Study of Pride (1951).
- The Splendour of Greece published by Hale (London) (1961) (no ISBN).
- Trumpet in the Night, London: Robert Hale (1961), 188pp.
- Lawrence of Arabia: a Triumph published by Pyramid Books (1962).
- The Civil War in Spain, 1936-1939. Gathered and annotated by Robert Payne. NY: Putnam, 1962.
- The Splendour of Israel Robert Hale, London (1963).
- Eyewitness: A Personal Account of a Tumultuous Decade, 1937-1946 Doubleday (1972) (no ISBN).
- The Corrupt Society: From Ancient Greece to Present-Day America Praeger (1975) ISBN 0-275-51020-4.
