= Luanzhou Mining =

Chinese coal mining company

The Luanzhou Mining Company (Lan-chou; Chinese: 滦州矿务公司) was a coal mining company in Luanzhou, Hebei Province, China. It was created by Zhou Xuexi in 1908 to compete with Kaiping Mines. The production began toward end of 1908.
