= Sun Baoqi =

Qing dynasty and Republic of China politician (1867–1931)

Sun Baoqi 孫寶琦
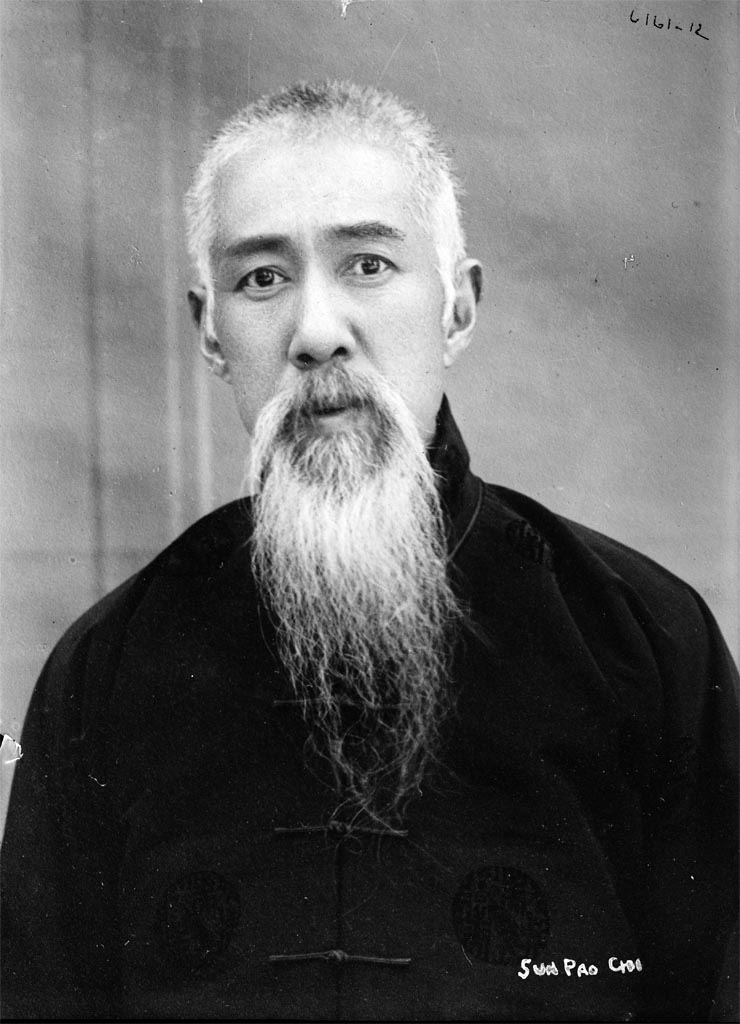
- Sun as the Premier of ROC, 1924

Premier of China
- In office 12 January 1924 – 2 July 1924
- President: Cao Kun
- Preceded by: Gao Lingwei (acting)
- Succeeded by: V.K. Wellington Koo (acting)

Minister of Finance
- In office 23 April 1916 – 20 May 1916
- President: Yuan Shikai
- Premier: Duan Qirui
- Preceded by: Zhou Xuexi
- Succeeded by: Zhou Ziqi (acting)

Acting Premier of China
- In office 12 February 1914 – 1 May 1914
- President: Yuan Shikai
- Preceded by: Xiong Xiling
- Succeeded by: Xu Shichang

Minister of Foreign Affairs
- In office 11 September 1913 – 27 January 1915
- President: Yuan Shikai
- Premier: Xiong Xiling; Himself (acting); Xu Shichang
- Preceded by: Lu Zhengxiang
- Succeeded by: Lu Zhengxiang

Governor of Shandong
- In office 28 June 1909 (Note: 11 May in Chinese calendar.) – 17 December 1911 (Note: 27 November in Chinese calendar.)
- Preceded by: Yuan Shuxun
- Succeeded by: Hu Jianshu

Personal details
- Born: 26 April 1867 Qiantang, Hangzhou, Zhejiang, China
- Died: 3 February 1931 (aged 63) Shanghai, China

Sun Baoqi (simplified Chinese: 孙宝琦; traditional Chinese: 孫寶琦; pinyin: Sūn Bǎoqí; Wade–Giles: Sun Pao-ch´i; 26 April 1867 – 3 February 1931) was a government official, foreign minister, and premier of the China. His courtesy name was Mu-han (慕韓)

== Biography ==
Sun was born in the subdivision Qiantang, Hangzhou, in 1867, the eldest son of Sun Yijing, a tutor. He received a classical Chinese education and was awarded the title of second grade yinsheng. He then married a relative of Yikuang. In 1886, Sun became a junior secretary of the Board of Punishments, a post he held until 1895. He was listed for assignment to a foreign post in 1898, but his appointment was delayed because of the Boxer Rebellion. In 1902, he briefly served as secretary of legation in Vienna, Berlin, and Paris, was then appointed Minister to France. Sun returned to China in 1906 and became chief secretary of the Grand Council, which was tasked with reorganizing the country's administrative system. In 1907, he became Minister to Germany. In January 1909, Sun was appointed assistant director of the Tianjin-Pukou railroad, and in June of that year he was appointed governor of Shandong Province. Sun was a supporter of constitutional government for China. In 1910, he urged the imperial authorities that a cabinet system be established, and in 1911 he recognized the independence of Shandong from Sun's rule. However, after Yuan Shikai secured power, Sun was forced to retract this declaration and resign.

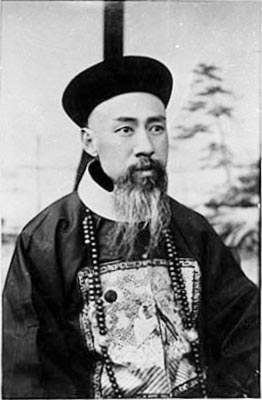
Sun Baoqi as Governor of Shandong

After the end of the Qing regime in 1912, Sun briefly entered a private business enterprise with Yikuang, but was quickly drawn back into government as co-director general and later acting director general of the Customs Administration. In June 1913, Sun visited Japan as a envoy by Yuan. On September 11, 1913, he was appointed to Premier Xiong Xiling's cabinet, and negotiated an agreement with Russia by which Russia recognized China's suzerainty over Outer Mongolia and China recognized Outer Mongolia's autonomy. When Xiong resigned in mid-February 1914, Sun became acting Premier until Xu Shichang assumed office in May. Sun served as minister of foreign affairs until January 1915, until he resigned in protest of Japan's Twenty-One Demands.

From this point on, Sun occupied primarily economic posts, as opposed to his previous foreign policy work. In January 1916, Sun became director of the bureau of audit, and in April minister of finance. In 1917 he was appointed director general of the Customs Administration and in 1920 became director of the economic administration bureau. He then became chairman and later director general of the famine relief bureau, as well as vice-chairman of the Yangtze River commission. In January 1924, Sun briefly became premier a second time, but resigned in July after friction with finance minister Wang Komin. After stepping down, Sun became chairman of the foreign affairs committee and refused several other postings before becoming president of the Hanyeping iron and steel complex and the China Merchants' Steam Navigation Company. In 1926, he was appointed general director of Sino-French University, and in 1928 he retired to Dairen when the Northern Expedition reached Peking in 1928. In 1929, Sun traveled to Hong Kong for treatment for a chronic intestinal disorder, and traveled to Shanghai and Hangzhou in 1930. His illness worsened soon after and he died on February 3, 1931.

== See also ==
- Who's who in China, Biographies of Chinese 中國名人錄，published by The China Weekly Review, 4th edition, 1931
- Who's who in modern China, Published in Hong Kong, 1954
