= Xiong Xiling =

Chinese philanthropist and politician

- 熊希齡
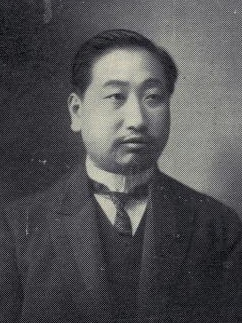

Premier of China
- In office 31 July 1913 – 12 February 1914
- President: Yuan Shikai
- Preceded by: Duan Qirui (acting)
- Succeeded by: Sun Baoqi (acting)

Minister of Finance
- In office September 1913 – February 1914
- Premier: Himself
- Preceded by: Zhou Xuexi
- Succeeded by: Zhou Ziqi
- In office March 1912 – July 1912
- Premier: Tang Shaoyi; Lu Zhengxiang
- Preceded by: Office established
- Succeeded by: Zhao Bingjun (acting); Zhou Xuexi

Personal details
- Born: 23 July 1870 Fenghuang, Xiangxi, Hunan, Qing Empire
- Died: 25 December 1937 (aged 67) British Hong Kong
- Party: Progressive
- Relations: Chu Chi Fui
- Children: Nora Hsiung Chu

Xiong Xiling, or Hsiung Hsi-ling (Chinese: 熊希齡; pinyin: Xióng Xīlíng; Wade–Giles: Hsiung^{2} Hsi^{1}-ling^{2}); 23 July 1870 – 25 December 1937) was a Chinese philanthropist and politician, who served as premier of the China from July 1913 to February 1914.

== Biography ==
Born in Fenghuang, Xiangxi prefecture of Hunan, China, Xiong was also a Chinese scholar.

In July 1913, Xiong was appointed by Yuan Shikai as the Premier and Finance Minister. However, after a few months, the relationship between Xiong and Yuan began to deteriorate, triggered by their conflicting views on governance. In February 1914, Xiong resigned from the government.

After he left politics, Xiong became involved in some educational and charitable institutions to help the needy of Beijing and Shanghai. In 1937, Xiong was in Shanghai, helping the refugees during the Battle of Shanghai. After Shanghai fell, he went to Hong Kong, dying there on 25 December 1937. He was honored with a state funeral.

His daughter Nora Hsiung Chu became an educator and expert on child welfare.

Preceded by Duan Qirui	Premier of China; 1913–1914	Succeeded by Sun Baoqi
