= M. D. Chow =

M. D. Chow (1878 – February 13, 1949 Shanghai), also known by the Chinese names Zhou Jinjue (Chinese: 周今覺) and Zhou Mingda (Chinese: 周明达), was a Chinese philatelist and mathematician. He was nicknamed the "king of Chinese philately".

== Names ==
Having multiple names was the custom during the Republic era. He was also known as Zhou Meiquan (周美权 or 周梅泉), Zhou Jinjue (周今觉; formerly romanised Chow Chin Tso).

== Early life ==
He was born into a salt merchant family in Yangzhou, Jiangsu and moved to Shanghai in 1912. He was home schooled.

== Philately ==
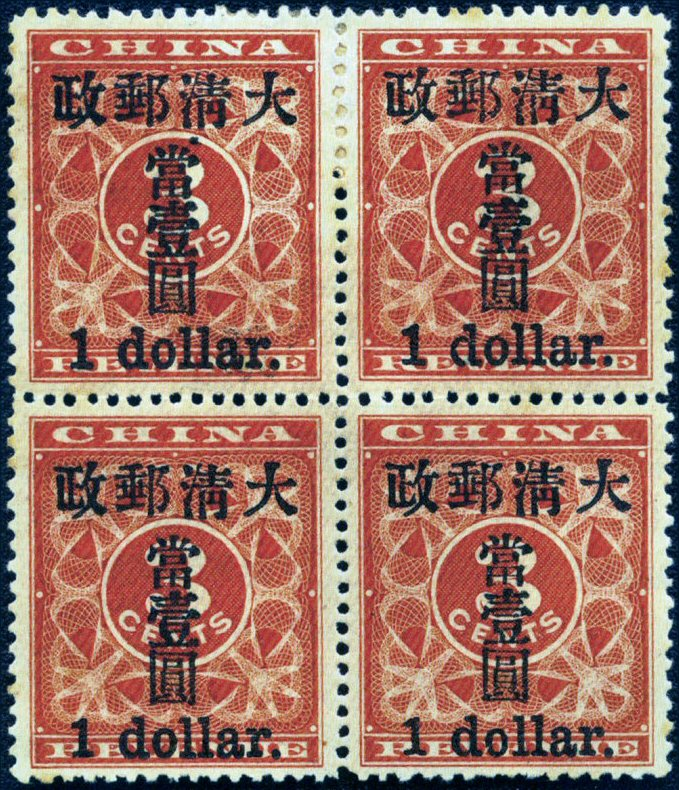
The block of four of the Small One Dollar Red Revenues; now owned by Ding Jinsong (丁勁松)

He was most noted as the founding father of Chinese philately and was crowned the King of Chinese Stamps after his acquisition of the rarest stamp, the block of four Red Revenue stamps from the original owner R. A. de Villard in 1927. He championed the study of the Red Revenues.

To entertain his sick son Wei-Liang Chow in 1923, he brought home many colorful foreign stamps during his recuperation. Soon they both caught the bug and began learning and collecting stamps. He found Chinese Philatelic Society on November 15, 1925. His bi-lingual Philatelic Bulletin won a Special Bronze Medal at the International Philatelic Exhibition in New York in 1926. Chinese stamps eventually became a gold medal contender in 1927 at the Strasbourg International Exhibition in France. He's the first Chinese to be granted a fellow of F.R.P.S.L., the Royal Philatelic Society London.

== Math clubs ==
In Yangzhou in 1900, he created Zhixin Math Club (知新算社) with Bao Mofen (包墨芬) and Yu Yudong (余雨东). As one of the finest mathematicians in China, he was highly praised by Japanese scholars. In the 1920s, he created Science Society of China (中国科学社) with Ren Hongjuan (任鸿隽) and Hu Mingxia (胡明夏), and was named co-honorary president with Zhang Jian.

== Awards and honors ==
His bi-lingual Philatelic Bulletin won a Special Bronze Medal at the International Philatelic Exhibition in New York in 1926.
