= Tong King-Sing =

Tang Jingxing
- 唐景星
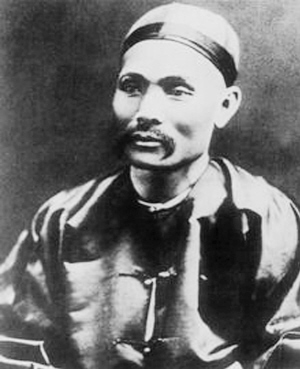
- Born: May 19, 1832
- Died: October 7, 1892 (aged 60)
- Occupations: comprador, interpreter, and businessman

Tang Jingxing (1832 – 1892; Chinese: 唐景星; pinyin: Táng Jǐngxīng; Wade–Giles: T'ang^{2} Ching^{3}-hsing^{1}), also known as Tang Tingshu (traditional Chinese: 唐廷樞; simplified Chinese: 唐廷枢; pinyin: Táng Tíngshū; Wade–Giles: T'ang^{2} T'ing^{2}-shu^{1}), was a Chinese comprador, interpreter, and businessman during the late Qing dynasty. Born in Xiangshan, Guangdong province, he studied in Robert Morrison's missionary schools as a boy and his classmates included Yung Wing. Because of the knowledge of English he obtained employment in the Hong Kong colonial government between 1851–57 and 1857–61, he served the Chinese Maritime Customs Service as interpreter and chief secretary. In 1861, he joined the Jardine Matheson Company, initially as a travelling salesman, visiting the various Yangtze River ports. In 1863 he was promoted and appointed Jardine Mathesion's Compradore in Shanghai. He was so successful in developing the company's trade he was soon made Chief Compradore responsible for all the company's compradores in other Chinese ports. Tang authored the work The Chinese Instructor, a six-volume series of dialogues, published in 1862.

Tang is mainly known for his participation in a number of officially sponsored commercial projects during the last decades of the Qing dynasty, collectively known as enterprises under "official supervision and merchant management" (官督商辦). Between 1873 and 1884 he served as the general manager of China Merchants' Steam Navigation Company in Shanghai, after which he worked in the coalmines in Kaiping in Zhili until his death in 1892. In Tangshan near Kaiping he was also a promoter of the Kaiping Tramway.

== Sources ==
- Carlson, Ellsworth C. The Kaiping Mines, 1877-1912. 2d ed. Cambridge, MA: East Asian Research Center, 1971.
