= Chinese Engineering and Mining Company =

Former Chinese mining company

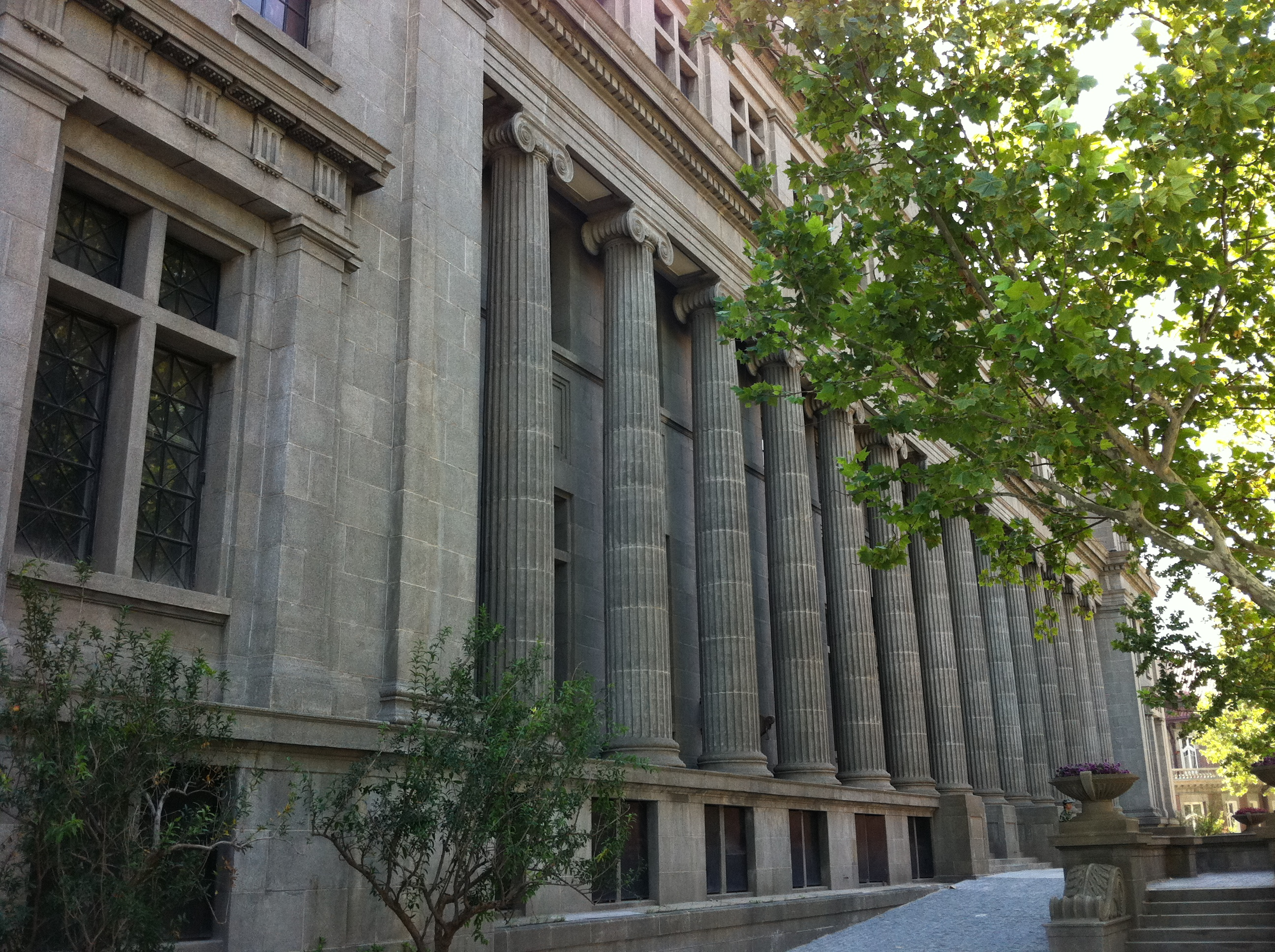
Former building of the Chinese Engineering and Mining Company in Tianjin

The Chinese Engineering and Mining Company, Limited, was established with foreign capital around 1879 to mine coal for the steamships of the Chinese Merchants' Steam Navigation Company and the Imperial Chinese Navy. English mining engineer Robert Reginald Burnett, MICE, directed the first shaft at Kaiping near Tangshan, Hebei Province, in 1879. The tram line between the mine and its canal to the Hai He eventually developed into the Imperial Railway of North China and the modern Jingha Railway, the civil engineering partnership Sir John Wolfe-Barry and Lt Col Arthur John Barry being appointed Joint Consulting Engineers to the Company at the end of the nineteenth century.

At various times there were organized riots against the railway; in one instance, thousands of dollars' worth of damage was done to mining equipment at the Tongshan colliery when a violent feud erupted between Cantonese and northern Chinese workers.

The company was formally chartered in 1900 and then reformed in 1912 as a public company listed in London. Together with the Lanchow Mining Company, it formed the Kailuan Mining Administration to oversee its coal mines, which were producing about 4.5 million tons annually during the 1920s. The company's activities were completely halted by the victory of the Communists in the Chinese Civil War and it was finally dissolved in 1984.

Its records between 1900 and 1951 are stored at the London Metropolitan Archives.

The rest of the company became the Kailuan Group at Tangshan, which is one of the largest coal mining companies in Mainland China.

== See also ==
- Kaiping Tramway
