= Zhou Xuexi =

Qing dynasty person

- 周学熙
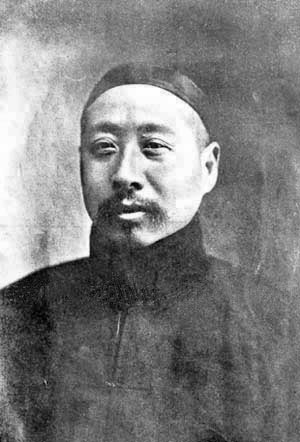

Minister of Finance of the Republic of China
- In office March 1915 – April 1916
- Preceded by: Zhou Ziqi
- Succeeded by: Sun Baoqi
- In office August 1912 – September 1913
- Preceded by: Xiong Xiling; Zhao Bingjun (acting)
- Succeeded by: Xiong Xiling

Personal details
- Born: 12 January 1866 Nanking
- Died: 26 September 1947 (aged 81) Peking
- Parent: Zhou Fu (father)
- Relatives: M. D. Chow, Zhou Shutao (nephews)

Zhou Xuexi (Chinese: 周学熙; Wade–Giles: Chou Hsüeh-hsi, January 12, 1866 in Jinling – September 26, 1947 in Beijing) was an industrialist of northern China who served as the Minister of Finance for the Beiyang Government of Republic of China from July 1912 to May 1913, and from January 1915 to March 1916. He was closely associated with Yuan Shikai and by Yuan's death in 1916 Zhou was the most important financier and industrialist in northern China.

He founded and/or led the following institutions/companies:

- 1901, Shandong University
- 1903, Hebei University of Technology
- Beiyang Bureau of Industry
- Kaiping Mines - merged with Luanzhou in 1912, renamed Kailuan
- 1906, Chee Hsin (Qixin) Cement Co.
- 1907, Luanzhou Mining
- Tientsin Official Bank
- 1908 Jingshi Water Works (now Beijing Water Works)
- 1916, Hua Hsin (Wah Hsing; Hua Xing) Cotton Spinning and Weaving Co.
- 1919, National Industrial Bank of China
- 1921, Pu Yu Machinery Co.
- 1923, Hua Hsin Bank

Zhou Xuexi was the fourth son of Zhou Fu, a late Qing high-ranking official.
