= Politics of Hainan =

The politics of Hainan Province in the People's Republic of China is structured in a dual party-government system like all other governing institutions in mainland China.

The Governor of Hainan is the highest-ranking official in the People's Government of Hainan. However, in the province's dual party-government governing system, the Governor has less power than the Hainan Chinese Communist Party Provincial Committee Secretary, colloquially termed the "Hainan CCP Party Chief".

== List of the CCP Hainan committee secretaries ==
Image	Name (English)	Name (Chinese)	Tenure begins	Tenure ends	Note
	Xu Shijie	许士杰	April 1988	June 1990	
	Deng Hongxun	邓鸿勋	June 1990	January 1993	
	Ruan Chongwu	阮崇武	January 1993	February 1998	
	Du Qinglin	杜青林	February 1998	August 2001	
	Bai Keming	白克明	August 2001	November 2002	
	Wang Qishan	王岐山	November 2002	April 2003	
	Wang Xiaofeng	汪啸风	April 2003	December 2006	
	Wei Liucheng	卫留成	December 2006	August 2011	
	Luo Baoming	罗保铭	August 2011	April 2017	
	Liu Cigui	刘赐贵	March 2017	November 2020	
	Shen Xiaoming	沈晓明	November 2020	March 2023	
	Feng Fei	冯飞	March 2023	Incumbent	

== List of governors of Hainan ==
1. Liang Xiang: 1988–1989
2. Liu Jianfeng (刘剑峰): 1989–1993
3. Ruan Chongwu: 1993–1998
4. Wang Xiaofeng: 1998–2003
5. Wei Liucheng: 2003–2007
6. Luo Baoming: 2007 – August 2011
7. Jiang Dingzhi: August 2011 – January 2015
8. Liu Cigui: January 2015 – April 2017
9. Shen Xiaoming: April 2017 – December 2020
10. Feng Fei: December 2020 – April 2023
11. Liu Xiaoming: April 2023 – present

== List of chairmen of Hainan People's Congress ==
1. Xu Shijie (许士杰): 1988–1992
2. Deng Hongxun (邓鸿勋): 1992–1993
3. Du Qinglin: 1993–2001
4. Bai Keming: 2001–2002
5. Wang Qishan: January 2003 – April 2003
6. Wang Xiaofeng: February 2004 – December 2006
7. Wei Liucheng: February 2007 – 2011
8. Luo Baoming: August 2011 – April 2017
9. Liu Cigui: April 2017 – November 2020
10. Shen Xiaoming: December 2020 – present

== List of chairmen of CPPCC Hainan Committee ==
1. Yao Wenxu (姚文绪): 1988–1996
2. Chen Yuyi (陈玉益): 1996–2003
3. Wang Guangxian (王广宪): 2003–2007
4. Zhong Wen (钟文): 2007–2011
5. Yu Xun (于迅): 2011–2018
6. Mao Wanchun (毛万春): 2018–present

== List of chairmen of the Hainan National Supervisory Commission ==
1. Lan Fo'an (蓝佛安): 2018–2021
2. Chen Guomeng (陈国猛): 2021–present
