= Hainan Free Trade Port =

Hainan Free Trade Port 海南自由贸易港
- Free-Trade Port
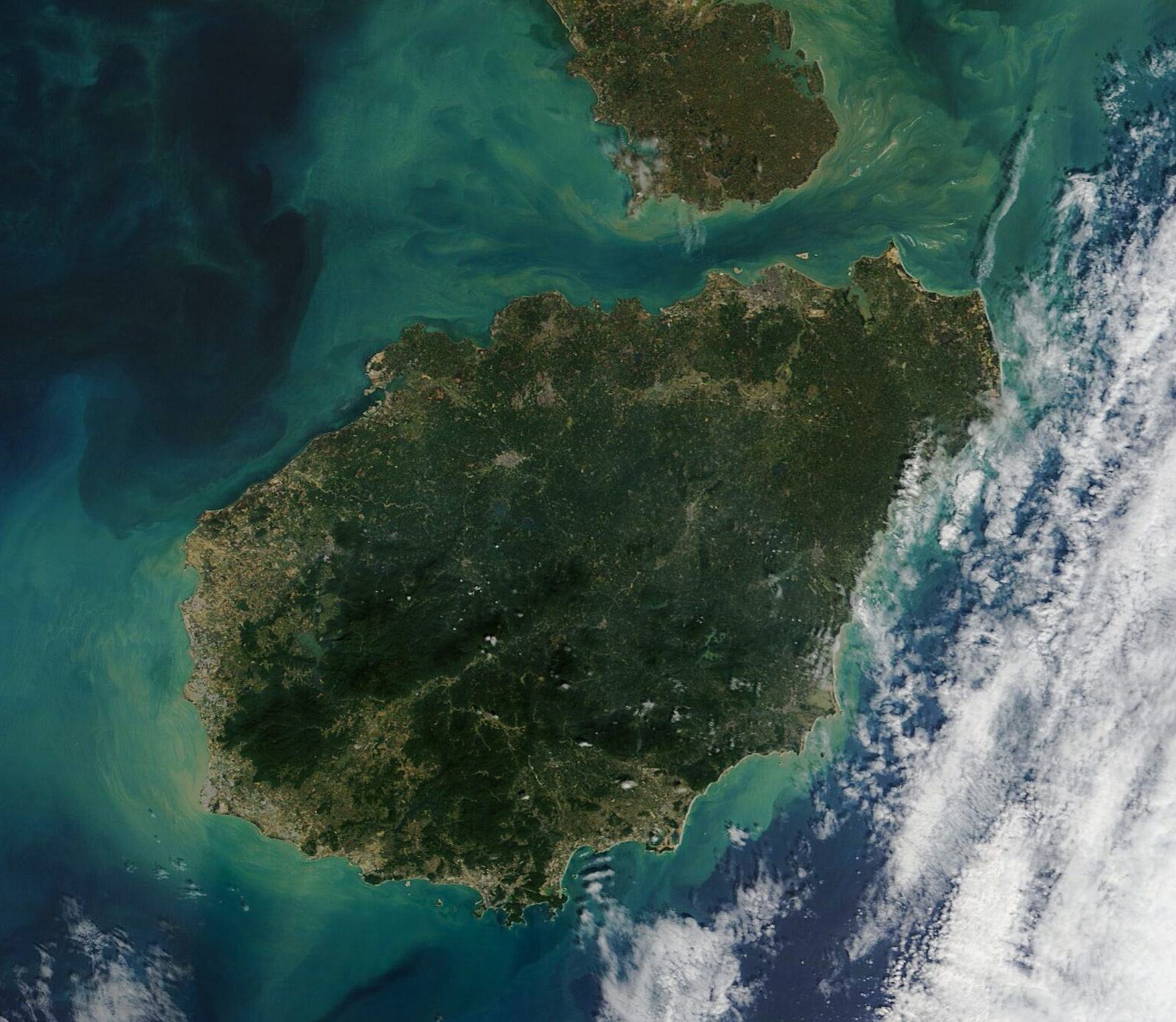
- Satellite photo of Hainan
- Country: China
- Province: Hainan
- Official launch: 18 October 2018
- Customs closure: 18 December 2025

Government
  - Body: Office of the Hainan Provincial Party Committee for the Hainan Free Trade Port

Area
  - Total: 35,354 km^{2} (13,650 sq mi)

Population (2020)
  - Total: 10,081,232
  - Density: 285.15/km^{2} (738.54/sq mi)
- Time zone: UTC+8 (China Standard)
- Website: www.hnftp.gov.cn

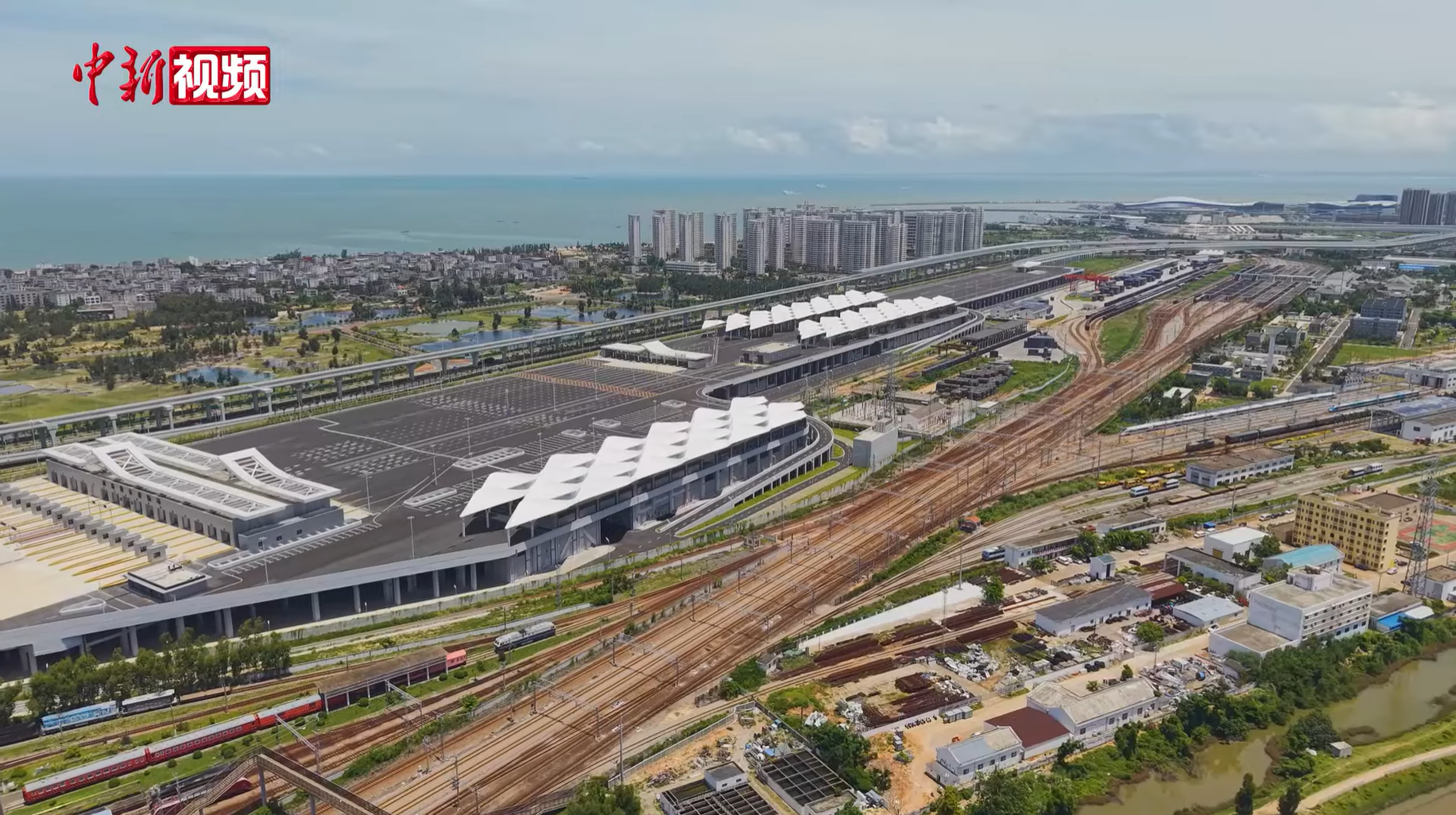
Xinhai Harbour, Hainan Free Trade Port

Hainan Free Trade Port refers to the designation of the entire island of Hainan, China, as a special economic development area and free-trade zone. It is the largest special economic zone in the People's Republic of China (PRC).

The Hainan Free Trade Port was announced by Chinese Communist Party (CCP) general secretary Xi Jinping in 2018, which was followed by the approval of the port's establishment by the State Council of China. In 2021, the Standing Committee of the National People's Congress passed the Law of the People's Republic of China on the Hainan Free Trade Port. Beginning in 2023, Hainan launched its customs closure operations (Chinese: 封关作业), adopting a "supervision of goods, not people" model. The Free Trade Port completed the customs closure and commenced full operation on 18 December 2025.

The Hainan Free Trade Port covers the entire province of Hainan. The Hainan Provincial People's Government operates under direct guidance from officials dispatched by central ministries and commissions under the State Council, including the National Development and Reform Commission, the Ministry of Finance, the Ministry of Commerce, the People's Bank of China, and the General Administration of Customs. The Law on the Hainan Free Trade Port outlines reforms related to changes in resident rights within the Free Trade Port, immigration and entry–exit policies, and customs closure procedures, representing a deepening of reform, innovation, and openness. Following authorization, Hainan is permitted to exercise a significant degree of local autonomy under the guidance of the central government. In addition to reforms and self-governance in customs, investment, and taxation, the province is expected to have distinct arrangements in major policies, administrative management, and visa systems from those of mainland China.

== History ==
On April 13, 2018, Xi Jinping, General Secretary of the Chinese Communist Party, announced on behalf of the CCP Central Committee at a conference celebrating the 30th anniversary of Hainan Province. General Secretary Xi Jinping required that Hainan should focus on supply-side structural reform and build a free trade port with Chinese characteristics. On October 16, 2018, the State Council approved the establishment of the Hainan Free Trade Zone and issued the "Overall Plan for the China (Hainan) Pilot Free Trade Zone".

September 16, 2019 Hainan Provincial Party Committee Secretary Liu Cigui: Free Trade Port Law is on the legislative agenda

On June 1, 2020, the CCP Central Committee and the State Council of the People's Republic of China issued the "Overall Plan for the Construction of Hainan Free Trade Port", proposing the principles of zero tariffs and low tax rates, increasing the off-island duty-free shopping quota to 100,000 yuan per person per year, and expanding the types of duty-free goods.

On June 3, 2020, 11 key parks held a ceremony to mark their opening. Among them, the key modern service industry parks include Haikou Jiangdong New Area, Haikou Comprehensive Bonded Zone, Sanya Central Business District, and Boao Lecheng International Medical Tourism Pilot Zone; the high-tech industrial parks include Yangpu Economic Development Zone (Dongfang Lingang Industrial Park, Lingao Gold Medal Port Development Zone), Haikou National High-tech Industrial Development Zone, Sanya Yazhou Bay Science and Technology City, Wenchang International Aerospace City, Hainan Ecological Software Park, and Fuxing City Internet Information Industry Park; the tourism industry parks include Lingshui Li'an International Education Innovation Experimental Zone.

June 8, 2020 Lin Nianxiu, deputy director of the National Development and Reform Commission: Hainan Free Trade Port will not have an impact on Hong Kong

On June 30, 2020, the Ministry of Finance and the State Taxation Administration issued the "Notice on Preferential Corporate Income Tax Policies for Hainan Free Trade Port" and the "Notice on Personal Income Tax Policies for High-end and Shortage Talents in Hainan Free Trade Port". The "Notice on Preferential Corporate Income Tax Policies for Hainan Free Trade Port" proposed that enterprises in encouraged industries registered and operated in Hainan Free Trade Port shall be subject to a reduced corporate income tax rate of 15%. Enterprises in the tourism, modern service and high-tech industries established in Hainan Free Trade Port shall be exempted from corporate income tax on income from new foreign direct investment. The "Notice on Personal Income Tax Policies for High-end and Shortage Talents in Hainan Free Trade Port" proposed that talents who meet the conditions for tax reduction and exemption working in Hainan Free Trade Port shall be exempted from the portion of their actual personal income tax burden exceeding 15%.

On August 24, 2020, Hainan published the 2020 Hainan Free Trade Port Investment Guide in Chinese and English, providing policy support for international institutions and individual investors. On September 13, 2020, the third batch of Hainan Free Trade Port construction projects started construction. On November 8, 2020, the ninth batch of institutional innovation cases for the Free Trade Port was released, involving matters such as “one-stop service” for ship registration and the reduction of approval procedures for low-altitude flights. On December 1, 2020, the first zero-tariff commodity list of Hainan Free Trade Port was officially implemented. On December 25, the second zero-tariff commodity list was released.

June 8, 2020 Hainan Provincial Party Committee Secretary: Hainan cannot become a real estate processing factory

On December 31, 2020, China's National Development and Reform Commission and the Ministry of Commerce released the 2020 version of the negative list for foreign investment access to the Hainan Free Trade Port, which abolished the prohibition on foreign investment in the exploration, mining and beneficiation of rare earths, radioactive minerals and tungsten in the mining industry.

On March 4, 2021, the Ministry of Finance, the General Administration of Customs and the State Administration of Taxation jointly issued the "Notice on the "Zero Tariff" Policy for Self-Used Production Equipment in Hainan Free Trade Port", which stipulates that enterprises registered in Hainan Free Trade Port and with independent legal person status will be exempt from customs duties, import value-added tax and consumption tax on imported production equipment for their own use, except for goods that are clearly not exempted from tax by laws and regulations and relevant provisions, goods prohibited from import by national regulations, and equipment listed in the "Negative List of "Zero Tariff" Self-Used Production Equipment in Hainan Free Trade Port" attached to the notice.

On 10 June 2021, the 29th meeting of the Standing Committee of the 13th National People's Congress passed the Hainan Free Trade Port Law of the People's Republic of China, which determined to establish and improve the Hainan Free Trade Port customs supervision special zone system with closed-off customs operations on the entire island. On the basis of effective supervision in accordance with the law, a goods trade management system with free entry and exit, safety and convenience will be established, and service trade management measures will be optimized to achieve trade liberalization and facilitation.

From September 2021, the Hainan Free Trade Port International Ship Regulations will be officially implemented. On 26 July 2021, the "Special Administrative Measures for Cross-border Trade in Services in Hainan Free Trade Port (Negative List) (2021 Edition)" was released. This is the first negative list released by China in the field of cross-border trade in services. On 29 September 2021, the 30th meeting of the Standing Committee of the 6th Hainan Provincial People's Congress reviewed and approved the Hainan Free Trade Port Fair Competition Regulations and the Hainan Free Trade Port Anti-Consumer Fraud Regulations. On 20 November 2022, the first foreign-invested enterprise cluster in Hainan Free Trade Port serving foreign-invested enterprises was unveiled in Qiongshan District, Haikou, and six foreign-invested enterprises signed letters of intent to move in at the same time.

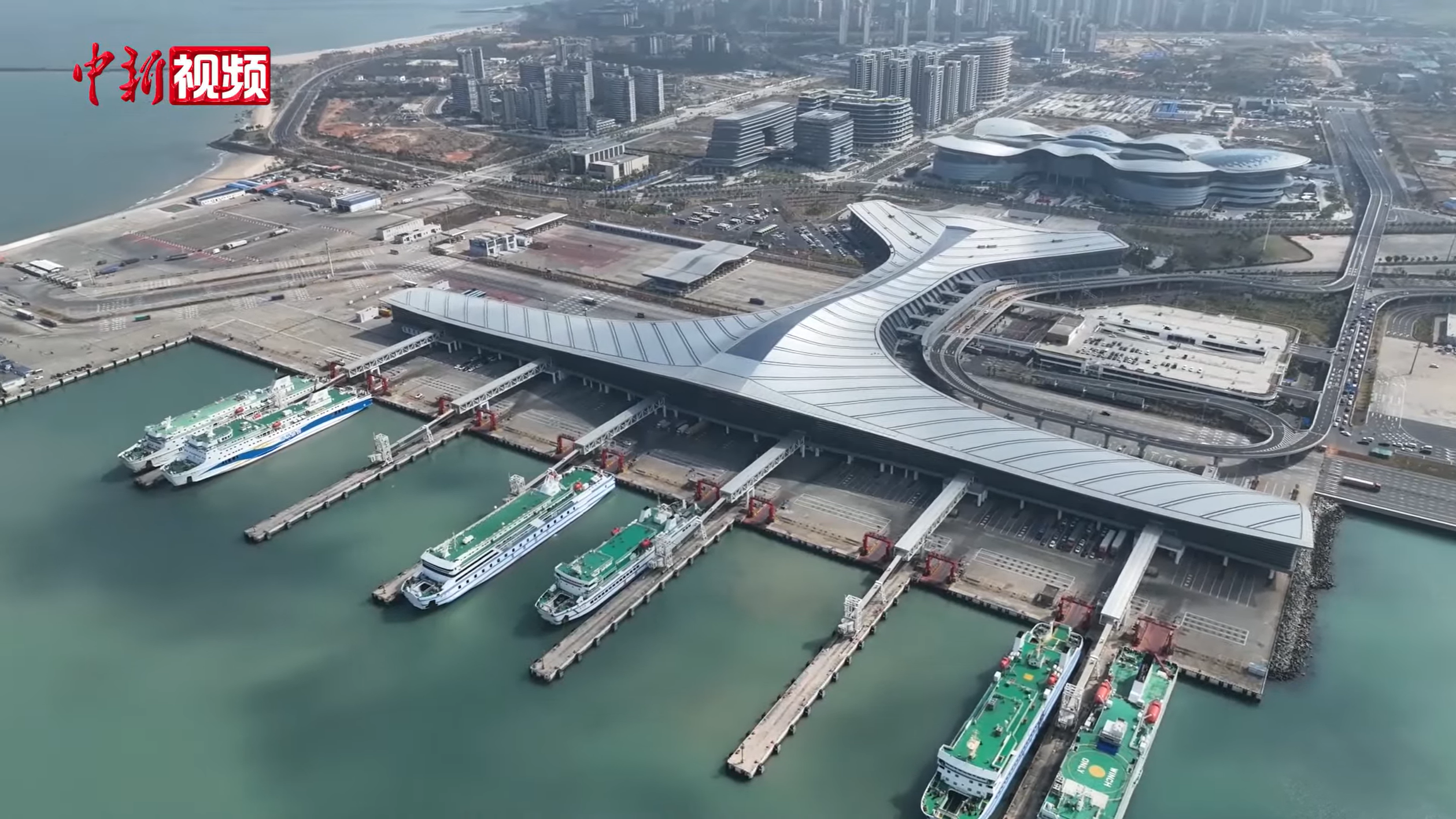
Xinhai Harbour, Hainan Free Trade Port

On 29 June 2023, the second batch of construction projects for the Hainan Free Trade Port in 2023 officially broke ground. A total of 180 projects were launched, with a total investment of 36.6 billion yuan. On 1 December 2023, the port's first intercontinental cargo charter route to North America was inaugurated.

On 5 January 2024, the inspection area for railway freight trains at Huairou South railway station—the first railway customs clearance project of the Hainan Free Trade Port, built by the China Railway 25th Bureau Group—was completed. On 17 April 2024, the port's first direct container shipping route to the Middle East was launched, with its maiden voyage successfully completed on 28 April 2024. On 6 May 2024, the Administrative Measures for Multi-Functional Free Trade Accounts of the Hainan Free Trade Port came into effect. On 6 December 2024, construction began on Phase III of Macun Port, one of the port's key infrastructure projects.

In October 2025, the fourth plenary session of the 20th Central Committee of the Chinese Communist Party adopted the proposals for the 15th Five-Year Plan, which explicitly called for the "high-standard development of the Hainan Free Trade Port." In November 2025, General Secretary Xi Jinping visited Sanya, stating that "the strategic goal of building the Hainan Free Trade Port is to make it a vital gateway for China's new era of opening to the outside world." On December 18, 2025, the Hainan Free Trade Port implemented island-wide customs closure, formally establishing Hainan Island as a special customs supervision zone.

== Politics ==
Hainan Free Trade Port is not a port in the usual sense, as the entire Hainan Island is regarded as a special economic development area. In addition to reforms and self-governance in customs, investment, and taxation, the province is expected to have distinct arrangements in major policies, administrative management, and visa systems from those of mainland China.

=== Legislative and executive powers ===
The Hainan Free Trade Port Law of the People's Republic of China grants the Hainan Provincial People's Congress and its Standing Committee the power to legislate on certain matters. Based on the laws and regulations of Hainan Province and the legislative power of the Special Economic Zone, the Hainan Free Trade Port can exercise laws and regulations that are different from those of other regions in mainland China and local government regulations; it can establish relatively independent and reform-oriented local laws based on the national laws. The laws that have been introduced so far involve environmental protection, anti-smuggling, big data development and application, Special Economic Zone Lawyers Regulations, Special Economic Zone Certified Public Accountants Regulations, Special Economic Zone Anti-Drug Regulations, and laws on the quick and simple review of company registrations.

The Hainan Provincial People's Congress and its Standing Committee have the power to independently formulate and implement Hainan Free Trade Port regulations in accordance with the Hainan Free Trade Port Law of the People's Republic of China. Local regulations and commercial dispute mechanisms will become the core of resolving and building the free trade port countermeasure system. The plan also allows Hainan Province to participate in international commercial arbitration and mediation in compliance with the provisions of the Constitution and current national laws and policies.

=== Big data social governance system ===
Hainan Province will establish a centralized provincial government data center and a unified "government cloud" across the province, using public networks, data centers, and software and hardware resource services as carriers to provide big data governance policy support to the government. Five basic databases will be built, including population database, legal person database, spatial geographic database, electronic certificates, and credit information. In order to realize the social governance system of big data, Hainan Province has established a statutory body, the Big Data Management Bureau, which has implemented an enterprise-based and market-oriented system and is responsible for the construction and operation of the province's e-government infrastructure, public platforms and common platforms. In May 2018, Hainan Province designated the "Hainan Province Public Information Resources Management Measures" to regulate the management of public information resources from cataloguing, collection, sharing, application, opening, information security and supervision. In July and September 2019, it issued the "Hainan Province Public Information Resources Safe Use Measures" and the "Hainan Province Big Data Development and Application Regulations" respectively.

=== Free Trade Port Administration ===
Leaders of the Free Trade Port Administration and Related Institutions
| Consulate General | State Council | Hainan Provincial Committee of the Chinese Communist Party (Secretary of the Provincial Committee: Feng Fei) | | Hainan Provincial People's Government |
| Free Trade Port Institutions | Department of Regional Coordination and Development National Development and Reform Commission | Comprehensively Deepening Reform Committee (with Deepening Reform Office under it) | Free Trade Port Working Committee (with the Free Trade Port Working Committee Office) | Hainan Provincial People's Government |
|---|---|---|---|---|
| Institutional leaders | Guo Lanfeng (Director) | Bater (Director) | Shen Danyang, Bater, Ni Qiang (Directors) | Liu Xiaoming (Governor) |
| Related positions held by leaders | Not applicable | Member of the Standing Committee of Hainan Provincial Committee of the Chinese Communist Party Secretary-General of Hainan Provincial Committee of the CCP Director of the General Office of Hainan Provincial Committee of the CCP | Shen Danyang Member of the Standing Committee of Hainan Provincial Party Committee, Vice Governor of Hainan Ni Qiang, Vice Governor of Hainan | Deputy Secretary of Hainan Provincial Party Committee |
| State Council deliberative and coordinative agencies | Ministry of Foreign Affairs; Ministry of Education; Ministry of Science and Technology; Ministry of Industry and Information Technology; Ministry of Finance; Ministry of Human Resources and Social Security; Ministry of Natural Resources; Ministry of Ecology and Environment; Ministry of Transport; Ministry of Agriculture and Rural Affairs; Ministry of Commerce; Ministry of Culture and Tourism; National Health Commission; People's Bank of China; State Administration for Market Regulation; State Drug Administration; State Intellectual Property Office; Civil Aviation Administration of China; General Administration of Customs; State Administration of Taxation; State Financial Supervision and Administration Bureau; Securities and Futures Commission; State Administration of Foreign Exchange; State-owned Assets Supervision and Administration Commission of the State Council | | | |
| Hainan Province related institutions | Party and government organs: General Office of the Hainan Provincial Committee of the Chinese Communist Party; Legislative body: Hainan Provincial People's Congress (and its Standing Committee ); Administrative organ: General Office of the Hainan Provincial People's Government (and its subordinate departments, directly affiliated special agencies, directly affiliated agencies, departmental management agencies and municipal and county governments); Judicial organ: Hainan Provincial High People's Court; Supervisory authority: Hainan Provincial Supervisory Committee; Political consultation body: Hainan Provincial Committee of the Chinese People's Political Consultative Conference; Procuratorial organ: Hainan Provincial People's Procuratorate; Hainan Branch of the People's Bank of China; Hainan Free Trade Port Construction Expert Advisory Committee; China (Hainan) Pilot Free Trade Zone (Free Trade Port) Advisory Committee; Hainan Provincial Big Data Administration; Hainan Provincial Government State-owned Assets Supervision and Administration Commission | | | |

== Hainan preferential visa policy ==
In July 2019, the Ministry of Public Security and National Immigration Administration further expanded the visa-free entry options for foreign nationals in Hainan. Besides tourism, foreign citizens could now enter visa-free for various purposes, including business, trade, visiting, family reunification, medical treatment, conferences and exhibitions, and sports competitions (excluding work and study) for up to 30 days.

=== Eligible countries ===
- European Union member states^{*}
- Albania^{*}
- Argentina^{*}
- Australia^{*}
- Belarus^{*}
- Bosnia and Herzegovina^{*}
- Brazil^{*}
- Brunei^{*}
- Canada^{*}
- Chile^{*}
- Iceland^{*}
- Indonesia
- Japan^{*}
- Kazakhstan^{*}
- Kyrgyzstan
- Malaysia^{*}
- Mexico
- Monaco^{*}
- Montenegro^{*}
- New Zealand^{*}
- North Macedonia^{*}
- Norway^{*}
- Philippines
- Qatar^{*}
- Russia^{*}
- Serbia^{*}
- Singapore^{*}
- South Korea^{*}
- Switzerland^{*}
- Thailand^{*}
- Ukraine
- United Arab Emirates^{*}
- United Kingdom^{*1}
- United States
- Vietnam

_{* – Visa-exempt in general (except nationals of the Czech Republic and Lithuania, who are visa-exempt only for Hainan).}

_{1 – For British citizens only.}

== Transportation ==
=== Shipping ===
On September 28, 2020, the first intercontinental route of Hainan Free Trade Port was opened to fill the gap in shipping routes with the Philippines and Australia

In order to connect with the Hainan Free Trade Port, on 1 January 2017, the construction of Xuwen Port in Zhanjiang, Guangdong officially started. The port includes 16 5,000-ton passenger ro-ro berths and 1 5,000-ton hazardous goods dedicated ro-ro berth. The first phase of the Xuwen Port project has a designed throughput capacity of 3.2 million vehicles and 17.28 million passengers. It became a major maritime and passenger transport hub connecting the two sides of the Qiongzhou Strait. At the same time, the port is the world's largest existing passenger ro-ro ferry terminal, and the ferry time from Zhanjiang to Haikou would be shortened to one hour. On September 28, 2020, Hainan Free Trade Port's first intercontinental transoceanic route (Yangpu-South Pacific-Australia) was opened.

=== Aviation hub ===
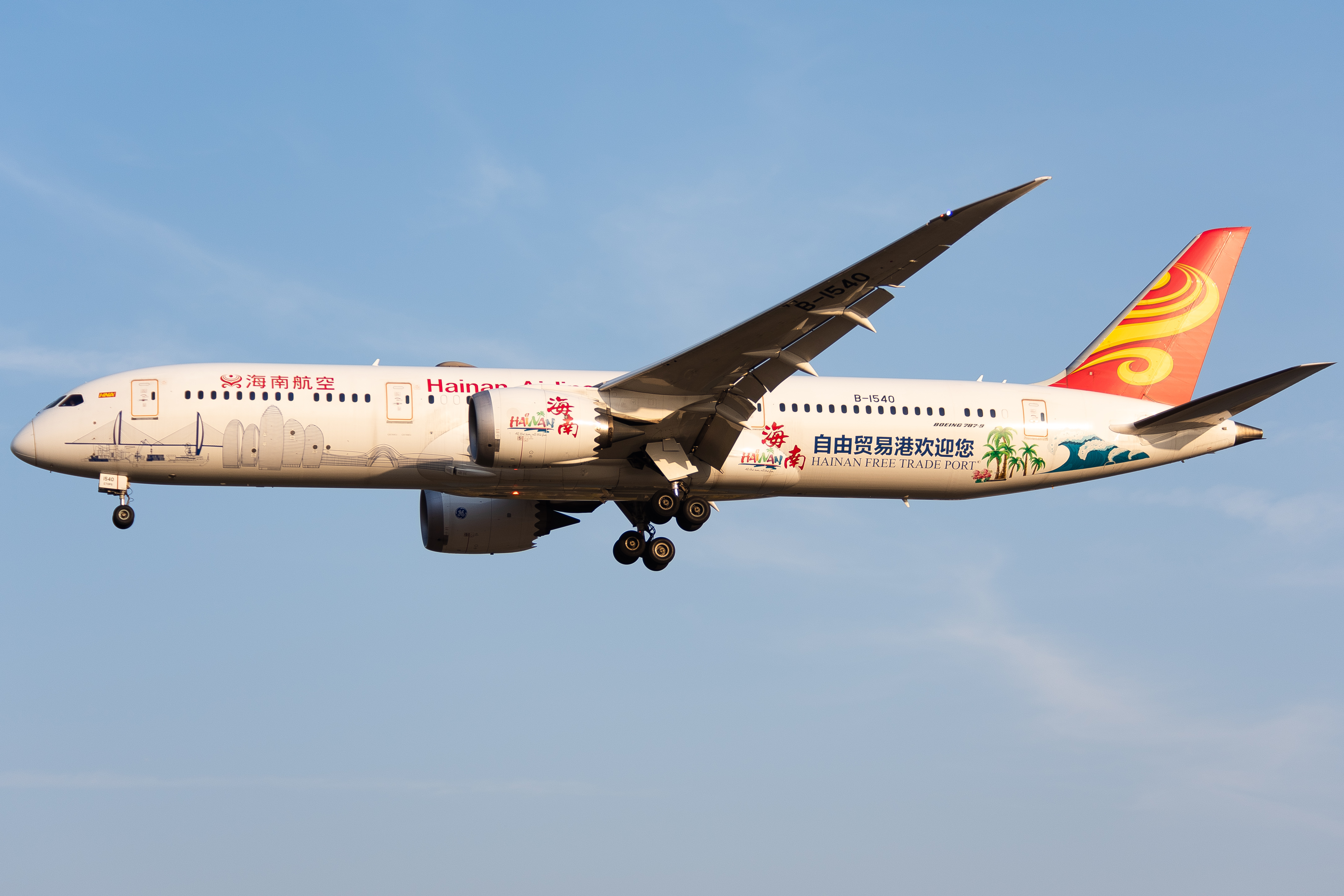
Hainan 7704 from Shenzhen, with Hainan Free Trade Port livery

According to the Hainan Free Trade Port policy, Hainan Aviation Hub can enjoy the seventh freedom and the fifth freedom. The Haikou Meilan International Airport launched its second phase expansion project after the release of the Free Trade Port policy. The airport is located in Haikou Jiangdong New District. The new airfield is rated 4F, with a 3,600-meter runway, two parallel taxiways and 61 parking stands, including 35 close parking stands and 36 jet bridges. The new T2 terminal has an area of approximately 296,000 square meters and is equipped with the largest airport duty-free commercial area in mainland China.

=== Infrastructure construction ===
Hainan is currently building a series of transverse roads on the island, including the GS360 Wenchang to Lingao Highway. On the basis of the existing three ring roads around the island, the highways from Wanning to Yangpu, Wenchang to Lingao, Danzhou to Baisha, and Wuzhishan through Baoting to Sanya Haitang Bay will be expanded to form an island ring road and city-linking transportation network, integrating the industrial chain and trade transportation roads; this series of projects is also one of the 10 billion-level key projects of Hainan Free Trade Port.

In addition, Hainan also plans to build a regional tourism route called the "National Coastal Scenic Road No. 1", which will build a coastal expressway based on the east–west expressway on Hainan Island to provide infrastructure support for tourist areas across Hainan Island.

== Economy ==
On March 27, 2021, the first regular intercontinental cargo route of Hainan Free Trade Port was launched

Hainan Free Trade Port mainly focuses on 12 industries in four categories, namely tourism, modern service industry, high-tech industry and natural resource mining and trade industry.

=== Special tax regime ===
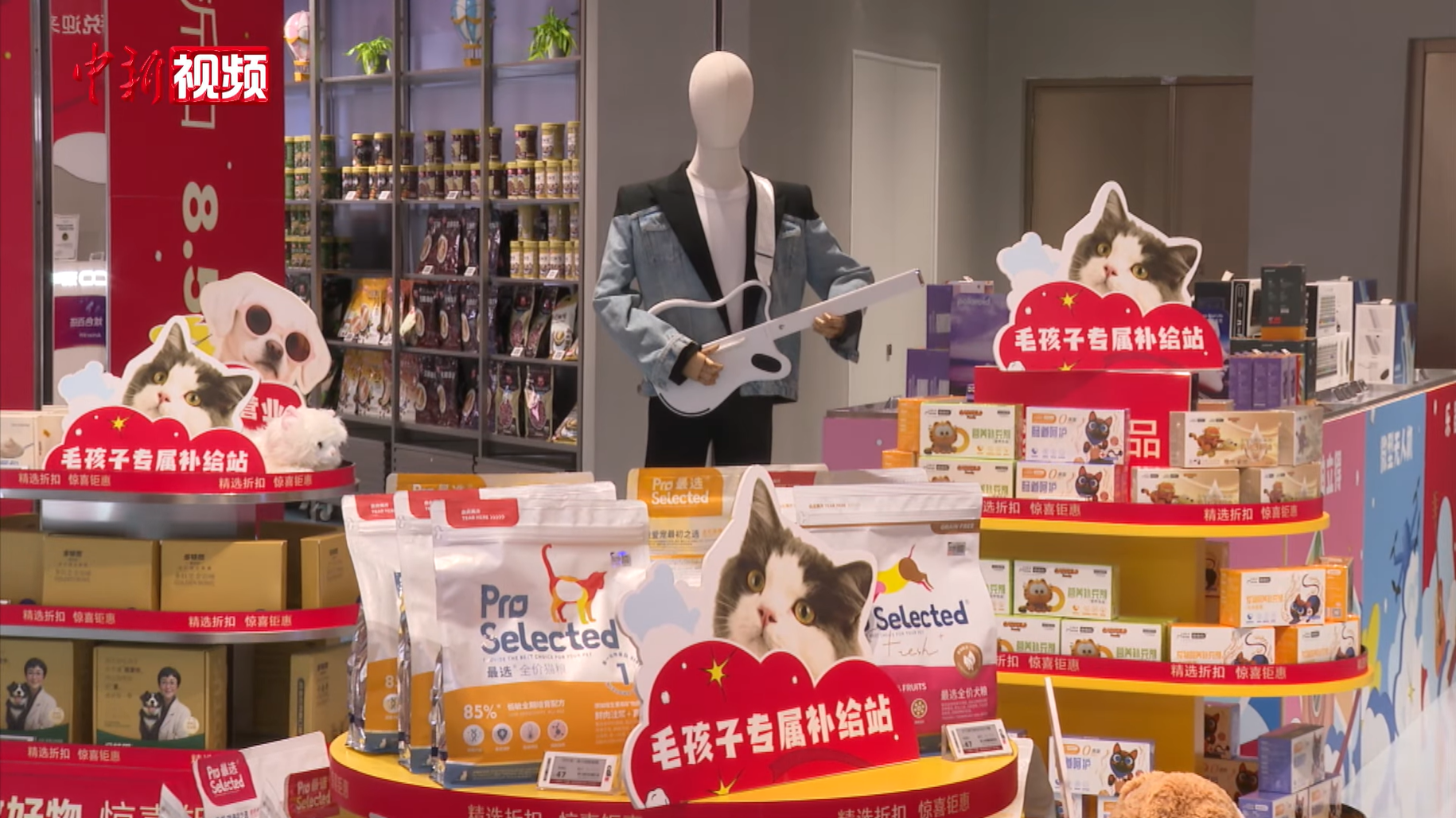
In November 2025, pet food was included in Hainan's offshore duty-free shopping policy for departing travelers.

Per the plan, Hainan will have a maximum personal income tax rate of 15% for qualified talents until 2027, compared to a maximum of 45% nationally. It will also have a 15% corporate income tax rate for encouraged industries, compared to 25% in the rest of China. The plan states that there will be an exemption from import tariffs, import-stage value-added tax and consumption tax on: production equipment imported for self-use by enterprises, imported operational transport vehicles, yachts, imported raw and auxiliary materials for production, and imported goods purchased by residents within the island.

Newly added foreign direct investment (FDI) projects in the tourism, modern services, and high-tech industries before 2025 are exempt from corporate income tax Exhibited foreign goods imported and sold during trade fairs are tax-exempt. Goods originating from Hainan, or those with over 30% value added using imported materials, are exempt from import tariffs when entering mainland China. Export tax rebates are granted for domestically built vessels registered in Yangpu Port and engaged in international transport.

=== Introduction of foreign talent and tourism policies ===
Foreign nationals are permitted to serve as legal representatives of statutory bodies, public institutions, and state-owned enterprises. A negative list management system is applied for work permits issued to foreign personnel. To enhance internationalization, the port facilitates full internet access for foreign tourists and businesspeople, and allows consumption via overseas credit cards

=== Offshore financial system ===
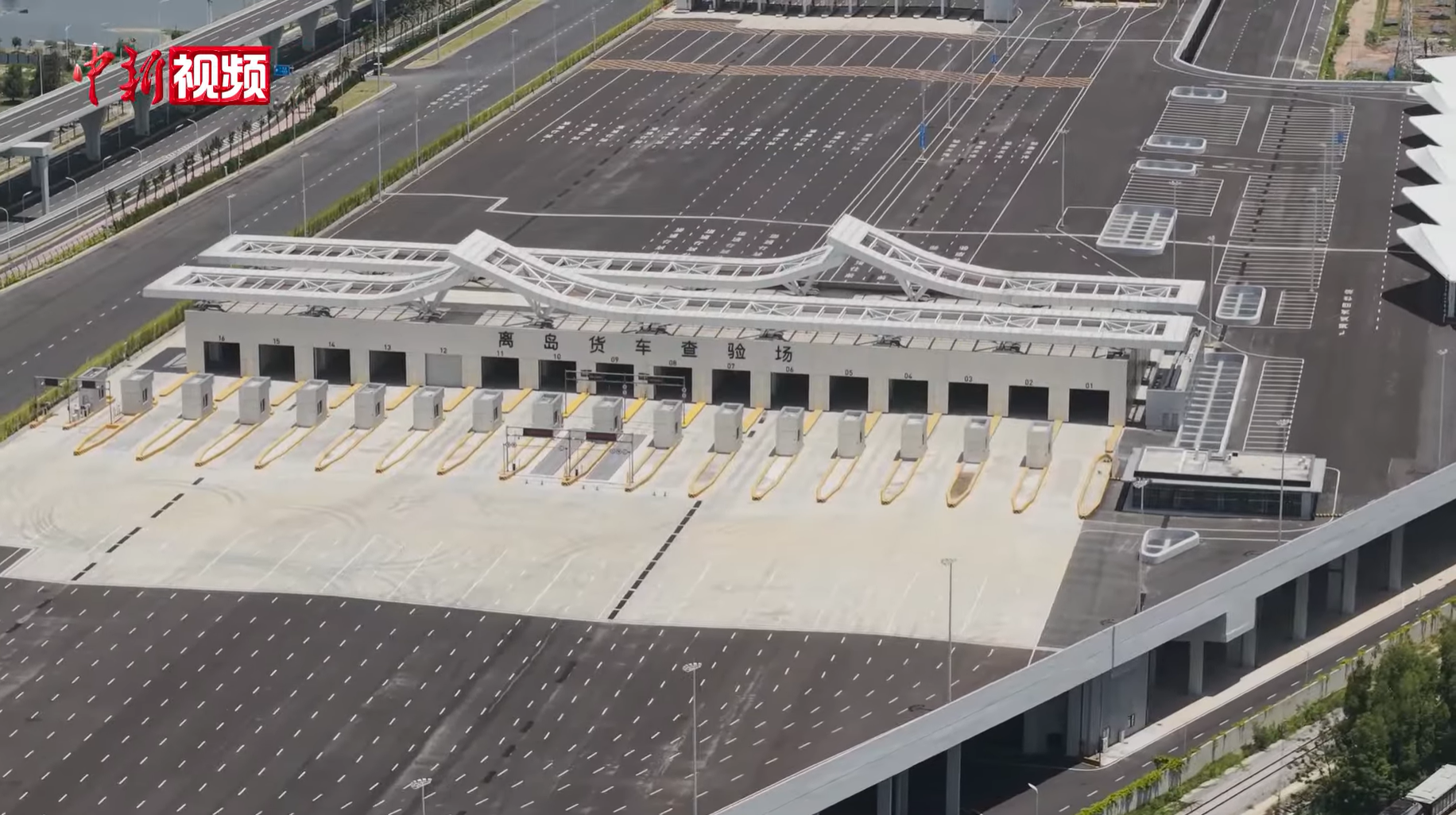
Off-island cargo truck inspection facility in Xinhai Harbour, Hainan Free Trade Port

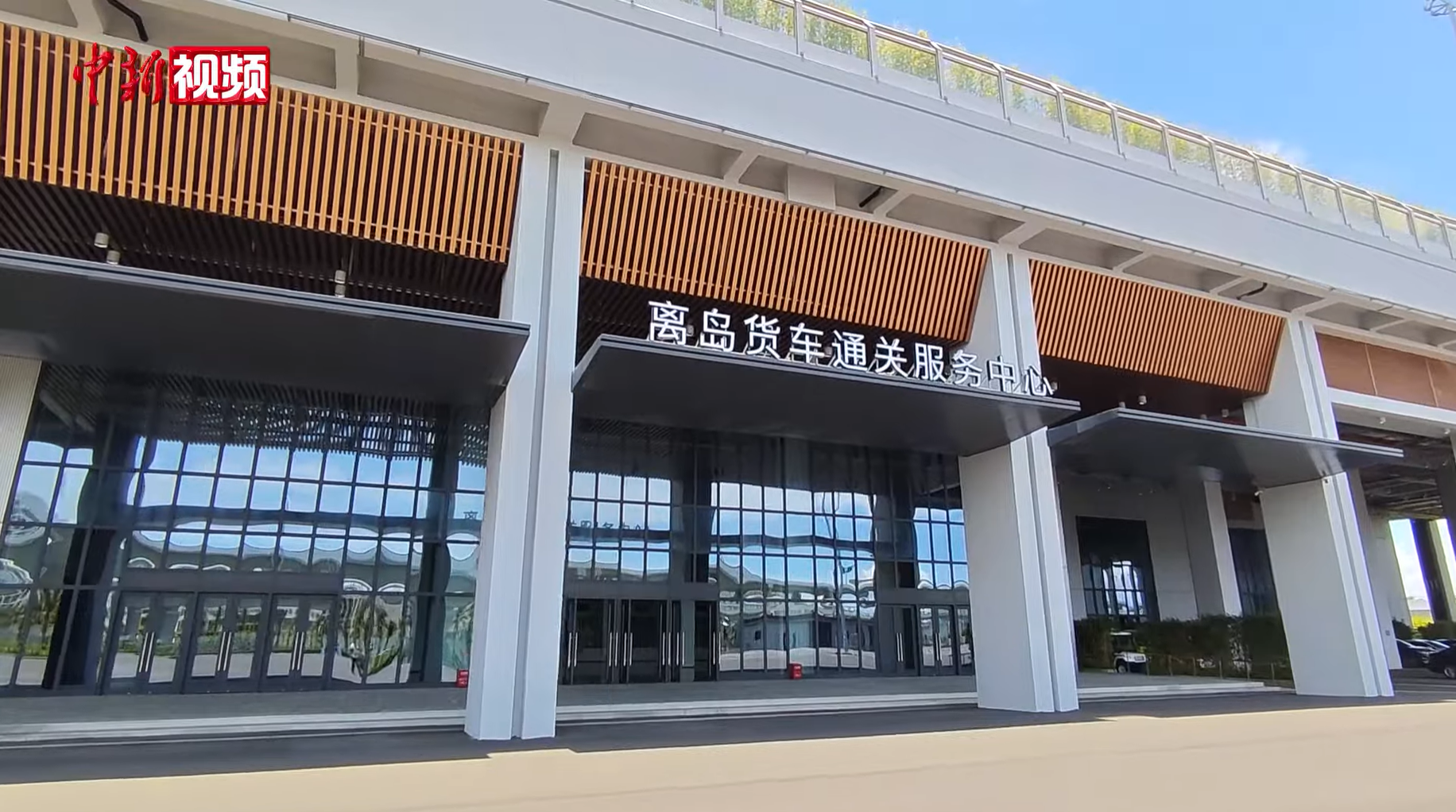
Off-island Cargo Truck Customs Clearance Service Center in Xinhai Harbour, Hainan Free Trade Port

The plan includes a removal of restrictions on offshore financing for ships and aircraft, authority for corporate foreign debt filing and registration delegated to Hainan, expansion of the scope for cross-border asset transfers, and priority support for enterprises seeking overseas listings. Enterprises may handle foreign exchange registration for overseas listings directly at banks. It entails support for the establishment of wholly foreign-owned or joint-venture financial institutions by overseas securities, fund, and futures firms. It also includes encouragement for the establishment of property insurance, life insurance, reinsurance, mutual insurance, and captive insurance companies. There will be a development of trading venues for international energy, shipping, property rights, and equity, promotion of over-the-counter derivatives business, development of cross-border asset management operations, creation of a multi-functional free trade account system, and Implementation of the "commitment to access upon declaration" market entry mechanism.

=== Key Free Trade Port zones ===
Yangpu Economic Development Zone (Chinese: 洋浦经济开发区) — A bonded port area and National Economic and Technological Development Zone focusing on petrochemicals, oil and gas storage, bulk commodity and international energy trading, international shipping logistics, and marine equipment industries. It has an oil and gas storage capacity exceeding ten million cubic meters, making it the second-largest commercial petroleum reserve base in China.

Boao Lecheng Pilot Zone of International Medical Tourism (Chinese: 博鳌乐城国际医疗旅游先行区) — China's first national pilot zone featuring international medical tourism, low-carbon ecological communities, and international institutional clusters. It is located adjacent to the permanent site of the Boao Forum for Asia.

Haikou Jiangdong New Area (Chinese: 海口江东新区) — A provincial-level new district located on the eastern coast of Haikou, designed as the city's central business and airport economic zone, focusing on headquarters economy, entrepreneurship, finance, education, and the aviation industry.

Haikou Integrated Free Trade Zone (Chinese: 海口综合保税区) — Located in Haikou and approved by the State Council, this customs special supervision area has full administrative authority under Haikou City. It integrates port, logistics, and processing functions and is one of the province's two customs supervision zones, being the only comprehensive bonded zone in Hainan.

Haikou National High-Tech Industrial Development Zone (Chinese: 海口国家高新技术产业开发区) — Established in 1991 with State Council approval, it is the only national high-tech industrial development zone in Hainan Province. Situated in central Haikou, it forms part of the city's mid-west development strategy, focusing on pharmaceuticals and medical devices, advanced low-carbon manufacturing, intelligent sensors, and information technology.

Sanya Yazhou Bay Science and Technology City (Chinese: 三亚崖州湾科技城) — Located in Sanya, it is planned under the Master Plan of Sanya Yazhou Bay Science and Technology City (2018–2035) as a new national deep-sea marine industrial zone, featuring the Deep-Sea Science City and Deep-Sea Innovation Center. It consists of five main components: Nanfan Science and Technology City, Deep-Sea Science City, University Town, Nanshan Port, and the Global Animal and Plant Germplasm Transit Base.

Sanya Central Business District (Chinese: 三亚中央商务区) — Located in Sanya, this zone focuses on headquarters business offices and large-scale consumer commercial areas, emphasizing headquarters services, free trade services, cultural and creative consumption, and design consulting. It comprises four sub-areas: Dong'an, Yuechuan, Phoenix Coast, and Hailuo, and oversees the development of Sanya's headquarters economy and the cruise and yacht industrial park.

Wenchang International Aerospace City (Chinese: 文昌国际航天城) — Located in Wenchang, it is an aerospace industrial cluster centered around the Wenchang Space Launch Site, focusing on launch and support services, high-end aerospace R&D and manufacturing, space data development and applications, international cooperation, and related "Aerospace+" industries.

Hainan Resort Software Community (Chinese: 海南生态软件园) — Located in Laocheng, Hainan, it serves as a national digital service export base, recognized as a national-level technology business incubator and a demonstration base for new industrialization. Major projects such as Tencent Ecological Village and Baidu Ecological Village, each worth billions of yuan.

Fullsing Town Internet Innovation Park (Chinese: 海口复兴城互联网信息产业园) — Located in Haikou, developed by Hainan Fullsing Industrial Park Investment & Management Co., Ltd., it aims to create a hub for the digital economy, an international offshore innovation and entrepreneurship base, and focuses on smart connectivity, digital trade, technology finance, and offshore innovation industries.

=== Other zones ===
Lingshui Li'an International Education Innovation Pilot Zone, located in Lingshui Li Autonomous County.

== See also ==
- Guangdong–Hong Kong–Macao Greater Bay Area
- Special Economic Zones of China
