= Hainan Provincial People's Government =

Provincial-level government in China

Hainan Provincial People's Government 海南省人民政府
- Established: April 26, 1988; 38 years ago

Leadership
- Governor: Liu Xiaoming; 2 April 2023
- Parent body: Central People's Government; Hainan Provincial People's Congress
- Elected by: Hainan Provincial People's Congress

Website
- www.hainan.gov.cn

The Hainan Provincial People's Government is the local administrative agency of Hainan. It is officially elected by the Hainan Provincial People's Congress and is formally responsible to the Hainan Provincial People's Congress and its Standing Committee. Under the country's one-party system, the governor is subordinate to the secretary of the Hainan Provincial Committee of the Chinese Communist Party. The Provincial government is headed by a governor, currently Liu Xiaoming.

== History ==
In April 1949, the government of the Republic of China established the Hainan Special Administrative Region as a provincial-level administrative region in Hainan. The Hainan Special Administrative Region has the Hainan Special Administrative Region Chief Executive Office.

In 1949, the Commissioner's Office of Qiongya Special District was established. On May 26, 1950, after the PLA entered the entire island of Hainan, the Hainan Military and Political Committee of the Chinese People's Liberation Army was established. On April 22, 1951, the Hainan Administrative Office was adjusted and established, and it was under the jurisdiction of Guangdong Province. On April 5, 1968, the Hainan Administrative Office was changed to the Hainan Administrative Region Revolutionary Committee, which was led by the Guangdong Provincial Revolutionary Committee. On January 1, 1980, the Hainan Administrative Region Office was restored and was still managed by Guangdong Province. On October 1, 1984, the Hainan Administrative Region People's Government was formally established at the vice-provincial level.

On April 13, 1988, the First Session of the Seventh National People's Congress decided to establish Hainan Province. On April 26, 1988, the Hainan Provincial People's Government was formally established.

== Organization ==
The organization of the Hainan Provincial People's Government includes:

- General Office of the Hainan Provincial People's Government

=== Component Departments ===
- Hainan Provincial Development and Reform Commission
- Hainan Provincial Business Environment Construction Department
- Hainan Provincial Department of Natural Resources and Planning
- Hainan Provincial Department of Tourism, Culture, Radio, Television and Sports
- Hainan Provincial Department of Ecology and Environment
- Hainan Provincial Department of Agriculture and Rural Affairs
- Hainan Provincial Department of Industry and Information Technology
- Hainan Provincial Department of Commerce
- Hainan Provincial Department of Science and Technology
- Hainan Provincial Department of Finance
- Hainan Provincial Department of Human Resources and Social Security
- Hainan Provincial Department of Education
- Hainan Provincial Health Commission
- Hainan Provincial Public Security Department
- Hainan Provincial Department of Justice
- Hainan Provincial Department of Civil Affairs
- Hainan Provincial Ethnic and Religious Affairs Committee
- Hainan Provincial Department of Housing and Urban-Rural Development
- Hainan Provincial Department of Transportation
- Hainan Provincial Audit Office
- Hainan Provincial Foreign Affairs Office
- Hainan Provincial Water Resources Department
- Hainan Provincial Department of Veterans Affairs
- Hainan Provincial Emergency Management Department

=== Directly affiliated special institution ===
- State-owned Assets Supervision and Administration Commission of Hainan Provincial People's Government

=== Organizations under the government ===
- Hainan Provincial Administration for Market Regulation
- Hainan Provincial Medical Insurance Bureau
- Hainan Provincial Bureau of Statistics
- Hainan Forestry Bureau
- Hainan Provincial Rural Revitalization Bureau

=== Departmental management organization ===
- Hainan Provincial Grain and Material Reserve Bureau, managed by the Provincial Development and Reform Commission
- Hainan Provincial Prison Administration Bureau (Hainan Provincial Drug Rehabilitation Administration Bureau), managed by the Provincial Department of Justice
- Hainan Provincial Drug Administration, managed by the Provincial Market Supervision Administration
- Hainan Provincial Intellectual Property Office, managed by the Provincial Market Supervision Administration

=== Directly affiliated statutory bodies ===
- Hainan Provincial Big Data Administration
- Hainan International Economic Development Bureau

=== Directly affiliated institutions ===
- Hainan Provincial Geological Bureau
- Hainan Provincial Supply and Marketing Cooperative
- Hainan Provincial Social Insurance Service Center

=== Dispatching Agency ===
- Yangpu Economic Development Zone Management Committee
- Hainan Provincial People's Government Office in Beijing
- Hainan Provincial People's Government Office in Guangzhou

== See also ==
- Politics of Hainan
  - Hainan Provincial People's Congress
  - Hainan Provincial People's Government
    - Governor of Hainan
  - Hainan Provincial Committee of the Chinese Communist Party
    - Party Secretary of Hainan
  - Hainan Provincial Committee of the Chinese People's Political Consultative Conference
