= Ni Qiang =

Chinese politician

- 倪强

Secretary-General of the Hainan Provincial Committee of the Chinese Communist Party
- In office November 2023 – 25 June 2025
- Preceded by: Bater
- Succeeded by: TBA

Vice Governor of Hainan
- In office March 2021 – November 2023
- Governor: Feng Fei

Personal details
- Born: May 1966 (age 60) Yangzhong County, Jiangsu, China
- Party: Chinese Communist Party (1987-2026, expelled)
- Education: Dalian Mariner Transport School; Shanghai College of Economic Management Cadres; Shanghai Business School; East China Normal University; Tianjin University

Chinese name
- Simplified Chinese: 倪强
- Traditional Chinese: 倪強
Transcriptions
Standard Mandarin
- Hanyu Pinyin: Ní Qiáng

Ni Qiang (Chinese: 倪强; born May 1966) is a former Chinese executive and politician. He was investigated by the Central Commission for Discipline Inspection in June 2025. Previously, he served as secretary-general of the CCP Hainan Provincial Committee and vice governor of Hainan. He was a delegate to the 12th and 14th National People's Congress.

== Early life and education ==
Ni was born in Yangzhong County, Jiangsu, in May 1966, and graduated from Dalian Mariner Transport School, Shanghai College of Economic Management Cadres, Shanghai Business School, East China Normal University, and Tianjin University.

== Career ==
Ni entered the workforce in January 1987, and joined the Chinese Communist Party (CCP) in May 1991. He worked in Shanghai Ocean Shipping Company before being assigned to COSCO Shipping Development Co., Ltd..

Ni got involved in politics in August 2008, when he was appointed deputy secretary of the Working Committee and director of the Management Bureau of Yangpu Economic Development Zone.

In March 2013, Ni was named acting mayor of Haikou, capital of south China's Hainan province, confirmed in July of the same year. He was made secretary-general of Hainan Provincial People's Government in February 2018, concurrently serving as director of the Provincial Government Office and director of the Provincial Coastal Defense and Port Office. He rose to become vice governor in March 2021, in addition to serving as director of the Provincial Government Office and director of the Office of the Provincial Free Trade Port Working Committee. In October 2023, he was admitted to standing committee member of the CCP Hainan Provincial Committee, the province's top authority. In November of that same year, he became secretary-general of the CCP Hainan Provincial Committee, director of the Provincial Party Committee Office, director of the Office of the Hainan Provincial Party Committee Comprehensive Deepening Reform Commission, and director of the Office of the Hainan Provincial Party Committee Free Trade Port Working Committee.

== Downfall ==
On 25 June 2025, Ni was suspected of "serious violations of laws and regulations" by the Central Commission for Discipline Inspection (CCDI), the party's internal disciplinary body, and the National Supervisory Commission, the highest anti-corruption agency of China. Ni was expelled from the party and dismissed from the public office on 6 February 2026.

Government offices
| New title | Director of the Management Bureau of Yangpu Economic Development Zone; 2010–2013 | Succeeded by Zhang Lei |
| Preceded by Ji Wenlin | Mayor of Haikou; 2013–2018 | Succeeded by Ding Hui |
| Preceded by Lu Zhiyuan | Director of the Office of the Hainan Provincial People's Government; 2018–2021 | Succeeded by Fu Xuanchao |
| Preceded by Lu Zhiyuan | Secretary-General of Hainan Provincial People's Government; 2018–2021 | Succeeded by Fu Xuanchao |
Party political offices
| Preceded by Bater | Secretary-General of the Hainan Provincial Committee of the Chinese Communist Party; 2023–2025 | Succeeded by TBA |
