= Luo Baoming =

Chinese politician

- 罗保铭

Party Secretary of Hainan
- In office 1 April 2017 – 25 August 2021
- Preceded by: Wei Liucheng
- Succeeded by: Liu Cigui

Chairman of the Hainan Provincial People's Congress
- In office 13 February 2012 – 7 April 2017
- Preceded by: Wei Liucheng
- Succeeded by: Liu Cigui

Governor of Hainan
- In office 9 February 2007 – 30 August 2011
- Preceded by: Wei Liucheng
- Succeeded by: Jiang Dingzhi

Personal details
- Born: October 26, 1952 (age 73) Tianjin, China
- Party: Chinese Communist Party (1971–2025; expelled)
- Education: Nankai University

Chinese name
- Simplified Chinese: 罗保铭
- Traditional Chinese: 羅保銘
Transcriptions
Standard Mandarin
- Hanyu Pinyin: Luó Bǎomíng

Luo Baoming (Chinese: 罗保铭; born October 1952) is a Chinese politician who spent his career in Tianjin and Hainan province. Until 2021, Luo served as the Communist Party Secretary of Hainan province; prior to that he served as governor of Hainan between 2007 and 2011.

== Early life and education ==
Luo was born in October 1952 in Tianjin. During the Cultural Revolution, Luo went to work for a military production corps in Inner Mongolia. He joined the Chinese Communist Party (CCP) in 1971. He pursued higher education at Tianjin Normal College after the Cultural Revolution, after which he entered the Communist Youth League organization in his native Tianjin, working as a youth organizer. Then he worked briefly in 1984 as head of the municipal research office.

== Career ==
In 1985, Luo was named head of the Communist Youth League organization of Tianjin. Between 1991 and 1994, he earned a part-time master's degree in Ming and Qing Dynasty history from Nankai University. In 1997, Luo was named to the Tianjin municipal Party Standing Committee, then head of the municipal party committee's Publicity Department. In 2001, Luo was named deputy party chief of the island province of Hainan; he then served several months concurrently as the province's propaganda chief, before relinquishing that role and continuing serving as the 'full-time' deputy party chief. He would stay in this position until 2007. Luo was first elected governor of Hainan by the Hainan People's Congress in February 2007. He was re-elected governor by the People's Congress on January 29, 2008. In August 2011 Luo was promoted to Communist Party Chief of Hainan and was succeeded by Jiang Dingzhi as governor.

In 2017, Luo left his post as party chief of Hainan, and was made a vice chair of the National People's Congress Overseas Chinese Affairs Committee.

Luo was an alternate member of 15th and 16th Central Committees of Chinese Communist Party, and is a full member of 17th and 18th Central Committees of CCP.

== Downfall ==
On 25 July 2024, Luo surrendered himself to the Central Commission for Discipline Inspection (CCDI), the party's internal disciplinary body, and the National Supervisory Commission, the highest anti-corruption agency of China.

On 24 January 2025, Luo was expelled from the CCP. On June 11, he was indicted on suspicion of accepting bribes by the Shanghai Municipal People's Procuratorate. On 9 December, Luo was sentenced to 15 years for bribery in 113 million yuan.

Party political offices
Preceded by Luo Yuanpeng	Head of the Publicity Department of Tianjin Municipal Committee of the Chinese Communist Party; 1997–2001	Succeeded by Xiao Huaiyuan
Preceded by Cai Changsong	Specifically-designated Deputy Party Secretary of Hainan; 2001–2007	Succeeded by Yu Xun
Preceded by Hong Shouxiang	Head of the Publicity Department of Hainan Provincial Committee of the Chinese Communist Party; 2002	Succeeded by Zhou Wenzhang
Preceded by Wei Liucheng	Party Secretary of Hainan; 2011–2017	Succeeded by Liu Cigui
Government offices
Preceded by Wei Liucheng	Governor of Hainan; 2007–2011	Succeeded by Jiang Dingzhi
Assembly seats
Preceded by Wei Liucheng	Chairman of the Hainan Provincial People's Congress; 2012–2017	Succeeded by Liu Cigui
