= Wei Liucheng =

Chinese businessman and politician

Wei Liucheng (Chinese: 卫留成; pinyin: Wèi Liúchéng born August 1946) is a Chinese businessman and politician. He is the former Governor and Chinese Communist Party Committee Secretary of Hainan province. In August 2011, Wei became one of the deputy chairs of the Committee on the Economy and Finance in the National People's Congress.

== Biography ==
Born in Biyang County, Henan, Wei graduated from Beijing Petroleum Institute then worked in China's petroleum industry for more than 30 years. In 1982 he joined the China National Offshore Oil Corporation and in 1998 was appointed general manager.

Wei moved to Hainan in October 2003, and was appointed Governor of Hainan in February 2004. He served in that position until February 2007 when he was appointed as secretary of the Hainan Provincial Committee of the Chinese Communist Party. He was re-elected by the Hainan People's Congress on January 29, 2008.

Wei was an alternate of 16th Central Committee of the Chinese Communist Party, and is a current member of 17th Central Committee.

Political offices
Preceded by Wang Xiaofeng	Governor of Hainan; 2004–2007	Succeeded by Luo Baoming
Preceded by Wang Xiaofeng	Chairman of Hainan People's Congress; 2007–2012	Succeeded by Luo Baoming
Party political offices
Preceded by Wang Xiaofeng	Party Secretary of Hainan; 2006–2011	Succeeded by Luo Baoming
