= Wang Xiaofeng (politician) =

Chinese politician

Wang Xiaofeng (Chinese: 汪啸风; pinyin: Wāng Xiàofēng; born October 1944) is a retired Chinese politician. He was born in Cili County, Hunan. Wang graduated from the China University of Mining and Technology and joined the Chinese Communist Party in May 1965. He has served as the deputy Party Committee Secretary of Changde. Wang was then elevated to the positions of Hunan Provincial Planning Committee director, Vice-Governor, and Deputy Party Committee Secretary.

Wang was then transferred to Hainan Province, where he successively served as Deputy Party Secretary in charge of party affairs, Vice-Governor, acting Governor, Governor, Party Secretary, and Chairman of the Provincial People's Congress. In 2007, Wang became the chief of the office of the Three Gorges Dam project (minister-level), a position he served at until 2010. In 2008, Wang was then named a member of the standing committee of the Chinese People's Political Consultative Conference, where he was also vice-chairman of the Population, Resources, and Environment Committee. He served one term on the body and then retired from politics in 2013.

Political offices
Preceded by Ruan Chongwu	Governor of Hainan; 1998–2003	Succeeded by Wei Liucheng
Preceded by Wang Qishan	Chairman of Hainan People's Congress; 2004–2006	Succeeded by Wei Liucheng
Party political offices
Preceded by Wang Qishan	Party Secretary of Hainan; 2003–2006	Succeeded by Wei Liucheng
