= Deng Hongxun =

Chinese politician and engineer (1931–2019)

- 邓鸿勋

Party Secretary of Hainan
- In office June 1990 – January 1993
- Preceded by: Xu Shijie
- Succeeded by: Ruan Chongwu

Personal details
- Born: January 1931 Wuxi, Jiangsu, China
- Died: December 21, 2019 (aged 88) Wuxi, Jiangsu, China
- Party: Chinese Communist Party
- Education: Jiangnan University

Deng Hongxun (Chinese: 邓鸿勋; January 1931 – 21 December 2019) was a Chinese politician and engineer. He served as the Party Secretary of Hainan Province from June 1990 to January 1993, and prior to that, as CCP Committee Secretary of his native city Wuxi and Deputy Party Chief of Jiangsu Province. His tenure in Hainan was marked by his fierce clash with Governor Liu Jianfeng.

== Early life and career ==
Deng was born in January 1931 in Wuxi, Jiangsu Province. He joined the Chinese Communist Party (CCP) in 1947 while a student at Kunshan High School, and participated in underground CCP activities. He entered Jiangnan University in 1949 and graduated in 1952 with a degree in industrial management and engineering.

After graduating from university, he was sent to Northeast China to work as an engineer and cadre, first at the Anshan Iron and Steel Company and after 1955, at the Benxi Iron and Steel. During the Cultural Revolution, he was sent to perform manual labour in Dafeng County, Jiangsu from 1967 to 1972.

He was transferred to the Zhenjiang Coking Plant in 1972, and later became its general manager. He was appointed Mayor of Zhenjiang City in 1983, and a year later, Communist Party Chief of Wuxi City. In 1989, he was promoted to Deputy Party Secretary of Jiangsu Province.

== Hainan and later career ==
In the aftermath of the 1989 Tiananmen Square protests and massacre, the top leaders of Hainan Province, Xu Shijie and Liang Xiang, were dismissed because Liang was an ally of the reformist national leader Zhao Ziyang and Xu supported Liang's policies. In June 1990, Deng was appointed Party Chief of Hainan to replace Xu, ostensibly because of his "rich experience in party and government leading positions" and "his familiarity with economic work", but it is commonly believed that his promotion was linked to his relationship with the central government leaders Jiang Zemin and Qiao Shi, the latter reportedly a close friend of his.

Deng was expected to bring his advanced experience in economic work to the fledgling province of Hainan, as he had worked in Southern Jiangsu, whose economy had been growing rapidly since the late 1970s. However, instead of focusing on economic reform, Deng emphasized "cadre building", citing Mao Zedong's quotations as justification. He brought to Hainan many of his followers and friends from Jiangsu, and forbade local cadres to build their own private houses. These acts alienated native officials and earned him a reputation for being anti-Hainan.

Moreover, Deng proved unable to work with Governor Liu Jianfeng, an associate of Premier Li Peng. From 1990 to 1992, the two top officials of Hainan clashed fiercely, hindering the province's development. By the end of 1992, Deng and Liu were trying to drive each other out of the province. A high-ranking official, Li Shanyou, accused Liu of visiting a prostitute. Li was imprisoned after the accusation was proven false, and Liu launched a counter-investigation to find the instigator, rumoured to be Deng. Their infighting became an embarrassment to the central government, which transferred both of them to Beijing in January 1993, and replaced them with a single official, Ruan Chongwu.

In Beijing, Deng served as Deputy Director of the Development Research Center of the State Council from 1994 to 1998. He was an alternate member of the 13th Central Committee of the Chinese Communist Party, and a full member of the 14th Central Committee. He also served as a member of the Standing Committee of the 9th Chinese People's Political Consultative Conference.

Deng retired in April 1998. He died on 21 December 2019 in Wuxi, aged 88.
