= Party Secretary of Hainan =

Provincial government position in China

Secretary of the Hainan Provincial Committee of the Chinese Communist Party
- 中国共产党海南省委员会书记
- Emblem of the Chinese Communist Party

- Flag of the Chinese Communist Party

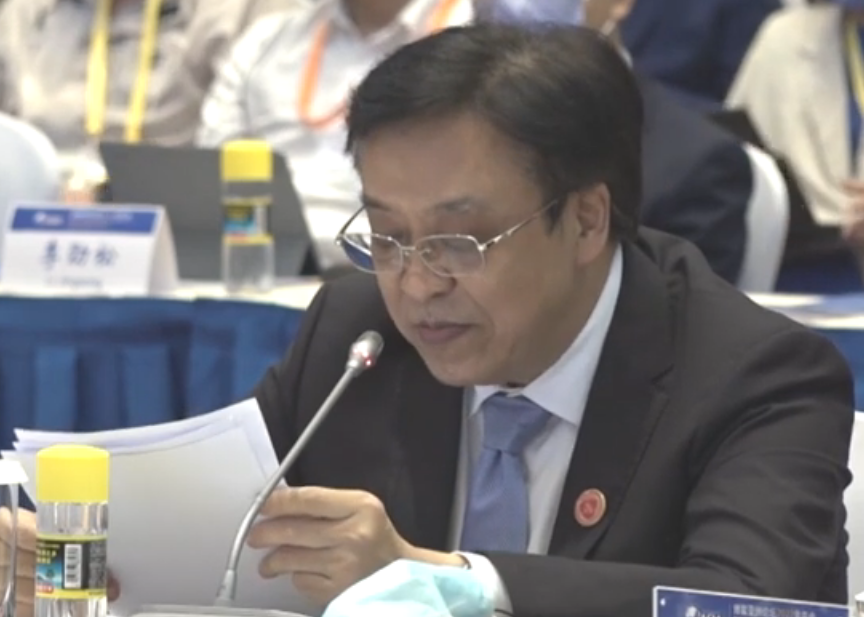
- Incumbent; Feng Fei since 14 March 2023
- Hainan Provincial Committee of the Chinese Communist Party
- Type: Party Committee Secretary
- Status: Provincial and ministerial-level official
- Member of: Hainan Provincial Standing Committee
- Nominator: Central Committee
- Appointer: Hainan Provincial Committee; Central Committee
- Inaugural holder: Xu Shijie
- Formation: April 1988
- Deputy: Deputy Secretary; Secretary-General

The secretary of the Hainan Provincial Committee of the Chinese Communist Party is the leader of the Hainan Provincial Committee of the Chinese Communist Party (CCP). As the CCP is the sole ruling party of the People's Republic of China (PRC), the secretary is the highest ranking post in Hainan.

The secretary is officially appointed by the CCP Central Committee based on the recommendation of the CCP Organization Department, which is then approved by the Politburo and its Standing Committee. The secretary can be also appointed by a plenary meeting of the Hainan Provincial Committee, but the candidate must be the same as the one approved by the central government. The secretary leads the Standing Committee of the Hainan Provincial Committee, and is usually a member of the CCP Central Committee. The secretary leads the work of the Provincial Committee and its Standing Committee. The secretary is outranks the governor, who is generally the deputy secretary of the committee.

The current secretary is Feng Fei, who took office on 14 March 2023.

== List of party secretaries ==
Image	Name (English)	Name (Chinese)	Tenure begins	Tenure ends	Note
	Xu Shijie	许士杰	April 1988	June 1990	
	Deng Hongxun	邓鸿勋	June 1990	January 1993	
	Ruan Chongwu	阮崇武	January 1993	February 1998	
	Du Qinglin	杜青林	February 1998	August 2001	
	Bai Keming	白克明	August 2001	November 2002	
	Wang Qishan	王岐山	November 2002	April 2003	
	Wang Xiaofeng	汪啸风	April 2003	December 2006	
	Wei Liucheng	卫留成	December 2006	August 2011	
	Luo Baoming	罗保铭	August 2011	April 2017	
	Liu Cigui	刘赐贵	March 2017	November 2020	
	Shen Xiaoming	沈晓明	November 2020	March 2023	
	Feng Fei	冯飞	March 2023	Incumbent	
