= Wang Qishan =

Vice President of China from 2018 to 2023

- 王岐山
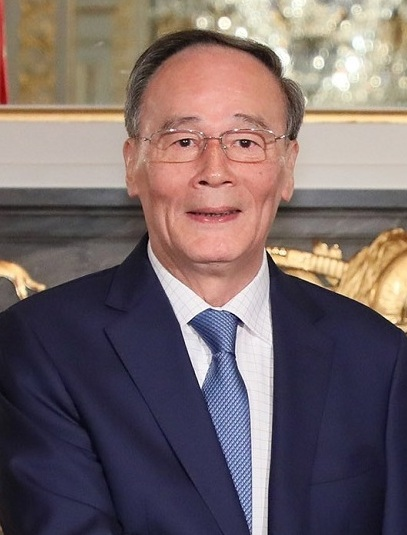
- Wang in 2019

Vice President of China
- In office 17 March 2018 – 10 March 2023
- President: Xi Jinping
- Preceded by: Li Yuanchao
- Succeeded by: Han Zheng

Secretary of the Central Commission for Discipline Inspection
- In office 15 November 2012 – 25 October 2017
- Deputy: Zhao Hongzhu; others
- Preceded by: He Guoqiang
- Succeeded by: Zhao Leji

Leader of the Central Leading Group for Inspection Work
- In office 15 November 2012 – 25 October 2017
- Deputy: Zhao Leji; Zhao Hongzhu
- Preceded by: He Guoqiang
- Succeeded by: Zhao Leji

Vice Premier of China
- In office 17 March 2008 – 16 March 2013 Serving with Li Keqiang, Hui Liangyu, Zhang Dejiang
- Premier: Wen Jiabao
- Portfolio: Finance, Commerce, others

Mayor of Beijing
- In office 20 April 2003 – 30 November 2007
- Preceded by: Meng Xuenong
- Succeeded by: Guo Jinlong

Personal details
- Born: 19 July 1948 (age 78) Qingdao, Shandong, Republic of China
- Party: Chinese Communist Party (1973–)
- Children: Anita Yiu Suen (adopted daughter)
- Relatives: Yao Yilin (father-in-law)
- Education: Northwest University

Wang Qishan
- "Wang Qishan" in Chinese characters
- Chinese: 王岐山
Transcriptions
Standard Mandarin
- Hanyu Pinyin: Wáng Qíshān
- Wade–Giles: Wang Ch'i-shan
- IPA: [wǎŋ tɕʰǐ.ʂán]

Wang Qishan (/wɑːŋ tʃiːˈʃɑːn/; Chinese: 王岐山; Wade–Giles: Wang Ch'i-shan; born 19 July 1948) is a retired Chinese politician who was one of the leading members of the Chinese Communist Party (CCP).

Wang gained prominence in China's financial sector in the late 1980s. In 1994, Wang became the governor of the China Construction Bank. Wang then successively served in three regional roles: vice governor of Guangdong, Party secretary of Hainan, and Mayor of Beijing. Wang then served as vice premier in charge of finance and commercial affairs under Premier Wen Jiabao from March 2008 to March 2013, during which he also gained a seat on the Politburo.

Between 2012 and 2017, Wang had served as the secretary of the Central Commission for Discipline Inspection, the CCP's internal control and anti-corruption body, and a member of the CCP's Politburo Standing Committee. He has been instrumental in carrying out General Secretary Xi Jinping's anti-corruption campaign since 2013, and is considered to be among Xi's closest political allies. From 2018 to 2023, he served as the vice president of China, when he was one of the leading figures behind China's foreign affairs.

== Early life ==
Wang Qishan was born in Qingdao, Shandong, but his ancestral hometown is considered Tianzhen, Shanxi. After graduating high school, Wang worked as a sent-down youth in the countryside, performing manual labour with peasants on a commune in the revolutionary heartland of Yan'an, where he met and befriended Xi Jinping. In 1973, Wang was admitted as a "Worker-Peasant-Soldier student" at Northwest University in Xi'an, where he studied history and graduated in 1976.

Wang met Yao Mingshan (姚明珊), the daughter of Yao Yilin, in Yan'an and the two later wed.

After graduation, Wang worked in the Chinese Academy of Social Sciences, researching late imperial Chinese history (1800s onwards) and Republican era (1912–1949) history.

In 1982, Yao Yilin became an alternate member of the Central Secretariat, and Wang was elevated to the Secretariat's office on rural policy research. This marked the beginning of Wang's political career.

== Career in finance ==
From 1982 to 1988, Wang worked in various posts in policy research. In 1988, Wang was transferred to become the chief executive of the Agricultural Investment Trust of China. A year later he became Vice Governor at China Construction Bank. Wang became Governor of the China Construction Bank in 1994 and served until 1997. During this time, Wang facilitated cooperation with U.S. investment bank Morgan Stanley, and was instrumental in the founding of China's first investment bank, the China International Capital Corp (CICC), and served as its first executive chairman.

In 1997, Wang was transferred to Guangdong to become its Executive Vice Governor, one of the highest posts in the provincial government. At the height of the Asian Financial Crisis, Wang assisted then Guangdong Party Secretary Li Changchun in managing non-performing loans of various state-owned enterprises in the province. In 2000, Wang was transferred back to Beijing. Since then, Wang developed a reputation for being a "financial specialist" in Premier Zhu Rongji's cabinet. Next, Wang served as the General Office chief of the State Economic Structural Reform Commission (国家经济体制改革委员会). After Hu Jintao became General Secretary in November 2002, Wang Qishan was transferred to Hainan and became Party Secretary of the province.

== Mayor of Beijing and Vice Premiership ==
Wang took over from disgraced Beijing mayor Meng Xuenong when SARS struck the city in spring 2003, at which time he had only served as the Party Secretary in Hainan for five months. After arriving in Beijing, Wang took an open approach to the release of information about SARS to the public. In contrast to the lack of transparency during the administration of his predecessor, Wang called for a daily press release on the latest information about SARS.

Wang was confirmed as Mayor of Beijing in early 2004. As mayor, Wang also served as the executive chair of the Beijing Organizing Committee for the Olympic Games (BOCOG). In March 2005, during a local radio show, Wang apologized on air to the Beijing public for an ongoing natural gas supply shortage in the city. The action won praise in the media and was said to have decreased the perceived distance between government officials and the public. Wang was known to be frank and responsible. But it was reported that during Wang Qishan's mayorship, he did not get along with Liu Qi, then Party Secretary of Beijing and a member of Politburo.

In 2007, after the 17th Party Congress, he was appointed as a member of the 17th Politburo of the Chinese Communist Party; in 2008, he was named a Vice Premier of the State Council within Wen Jiabao government, in charge of finance and commerce. In 2009, Wang was appointed by President Hu Jintao as his special representative to chair the Economic Track of the U.S.-China Strategic and Economic Dialogue for the Chinese side.

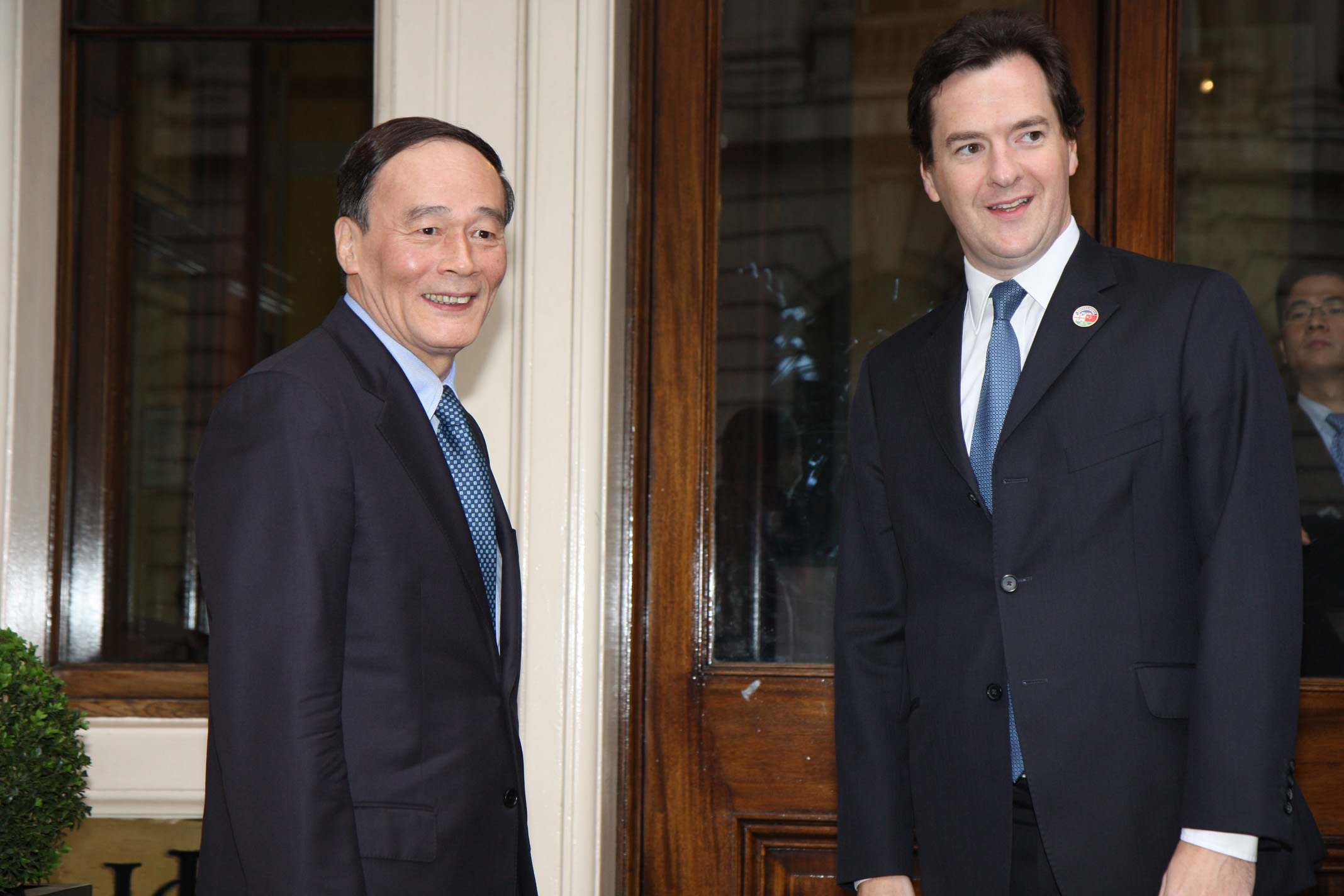
George Osborne with Wang Qishan outside the Institute of Directors in London, 8 September 2011

Wang was named as one of the most influential people in the world in the 2009 Time 100 list.

== Politburo Standing Committee and anti-corruption ==
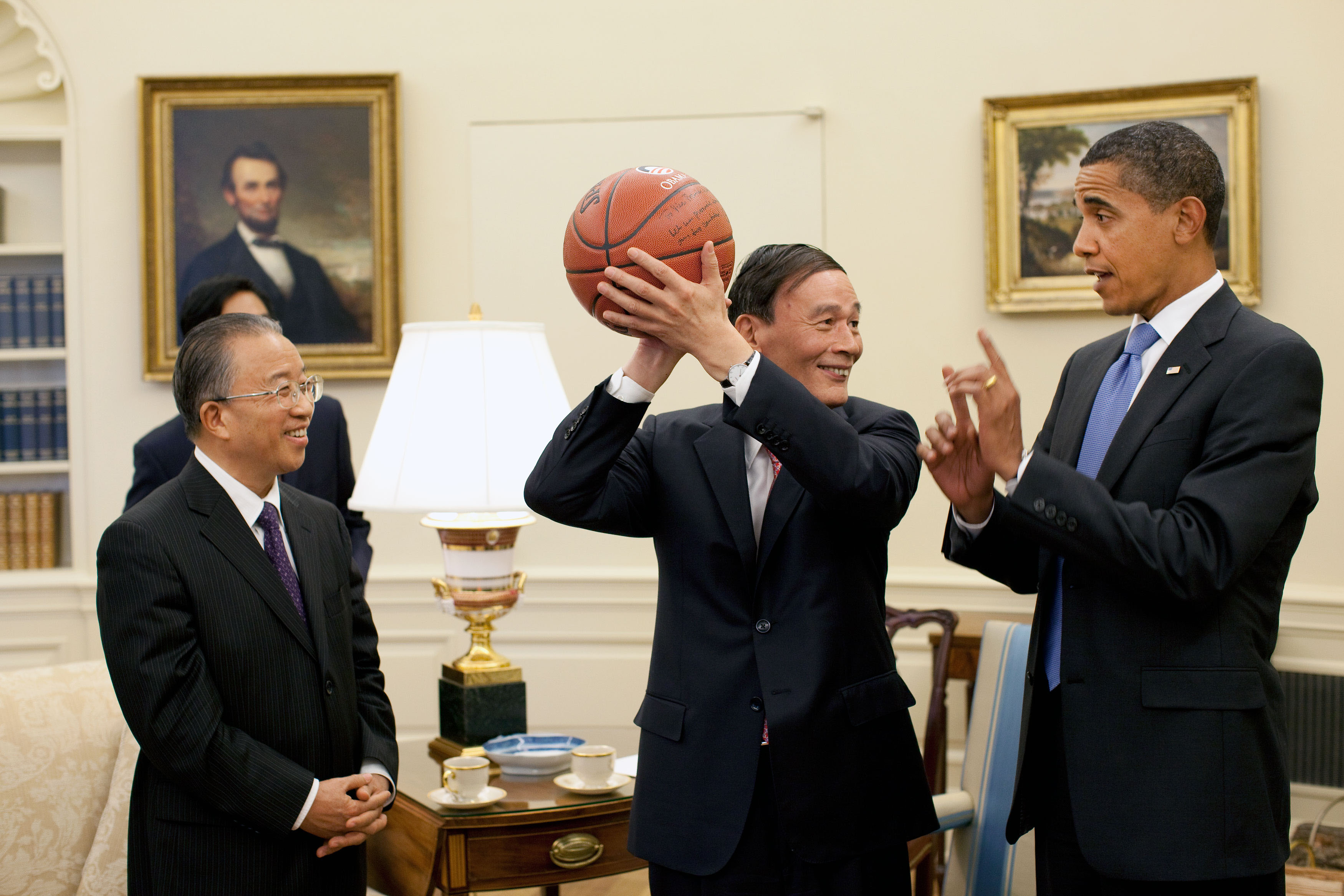
Then Vice Premier Wang Qishan and former State Councilor Dai Bingguo holding a basketball in the Oval Office with U.S. President Barack Obama (2009)

In the lead-up to the 18th National Congress of the Chinese Communist Party in 2012, Wang was seen by observers as a rising political star, with a diverse political pedigree spanning the realms of high finance, regional government, and policy development and execution. Wang ultimately entered the ranks of the Politburo Standing Committee, considered the pinnacle of power in China, at the 18th Party Congress, taking on the job of the Secretary of the Central Commission for Discipline Inspection, the party's top anti-graft body. Xi Jinping became General Secretary of the Chinese Communist Party at the same Congress. The appointment was unexpected given Wang's experience in the economic realm; he was seen as a more likely candidate for executive Vice Premier. The decision to hand Wang the disciplinary portfolio seemed to have come as a surprise even to Wang himself: in video footage of a leaked CCDI conference after taking the helm of the body, Wang said of the decision, "you can go look at media reports before the 18th Congress, who knew Wang Qishan was going to become secretary of the CCDI?... That's how things work. You do what the party tells you to do."

Wang's assuming the leading anti-corruption post was believed to be at least partly owing to his relationship with Xi Jinping. Wang was friends with Xi beginning in their youth, they shared a bunk when they were both performing manual labour in Shaanxi province during the Cultural Revolution, and Wang lent Xi books related to economics; Wang also had dealings with Xi during the latter's time as a regional official in Fujian.

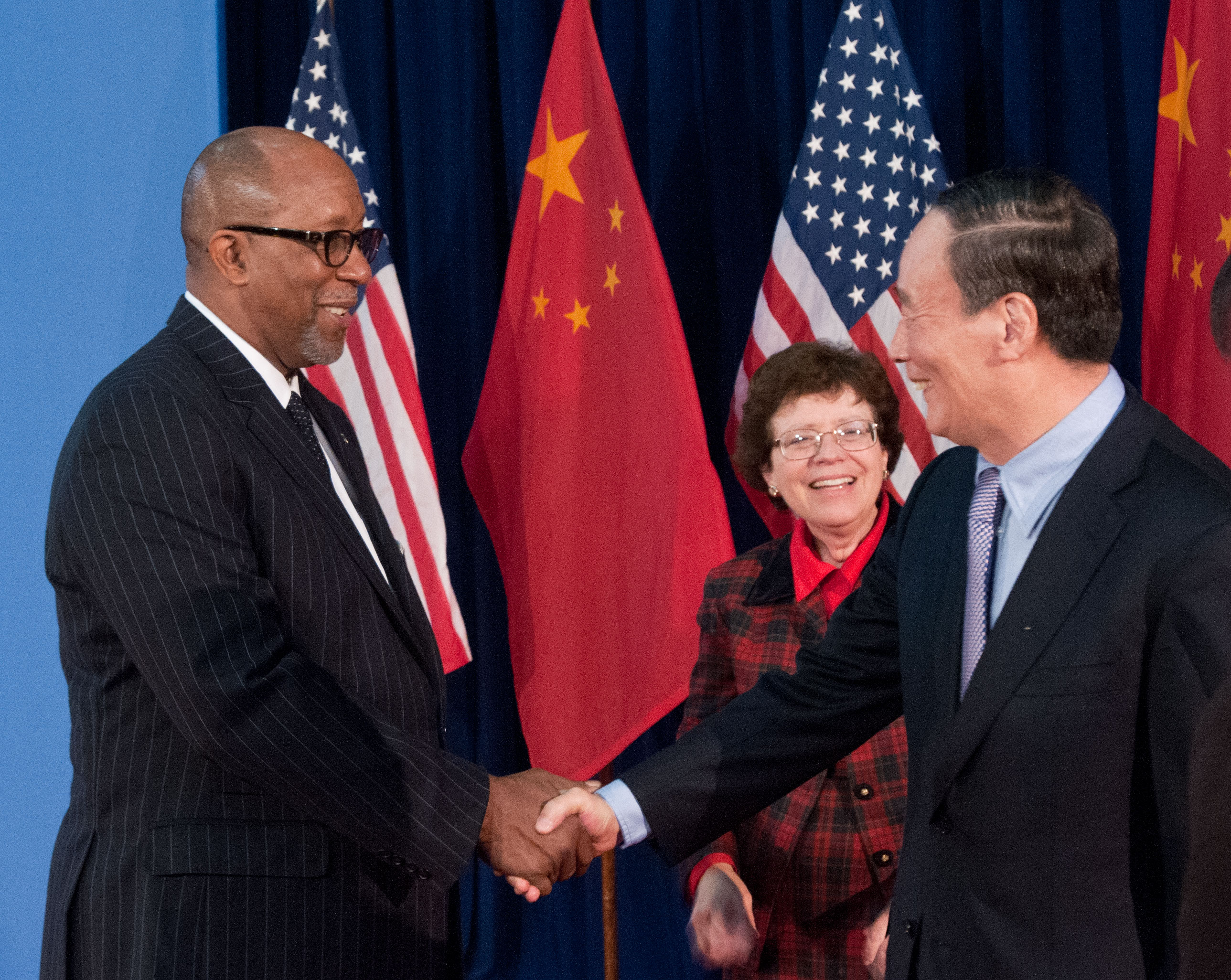
Wang Qishan meeting with U.S. Trade Representative Ron Kirk, and Acting U. S. Commerce Secretary Rebecca Blank at the Andrew W. Mellon Auditorium in Washington, D.C., on December 19, 2012

Beginning in late 2012, Wang emerged as the public face of Xi Jinping's anti-corruption campaign, the most far-reaching campaign of its sort since the founding of the PRC in 1949, and was instrumental for its implementation. He also became the Leader of the Central Leading Group for Inspection Work, responsible for dispatching teams to the provinces and state-owned enterprises with the goal of rooting out corruption. Following the 18th Party Congress, Wang was often considered the second most powerful man in China, second only to Xi, the Party General Secretary (paramount leader). Notable officials that were investigated under Wang's tenure include former Politburo Standing Committee member Zhou Yongkang, former CCP General Office Director Ling Jihua, former Central Military Commission Vice Chairmen Xu Caihou and Guo Boxiong, and Politburo member Sun Zhengcai.

Wang became a favourite of the media. In October 2015, the CCDI under Wang's leadership released a new and complete set of regulations on party disciplinary procedures and rules on party member conduct, a document aimed at institutionalizing the party's ability to discipline its members and reduce corruption. Additionally, Wang introduced for the first time a set of disciplinary procedures for party disciplinary officials themselves. Wang's anti-corruption work gained him accolades within the party leadership, with many calling for an extension of his term at the 19th Party Congress in 2017.

As Chief of the commission, Wang strengthened the chain of command and insulated local branches of the commission from local party leaders. Since 2017, local branches of the commission must simultaneously report investigative activities to both the local party committee and the higher-level discipline inspection commission, which became authorized to arbitrate jurisdictional conflicts in matters of disciplinary supervision.

== Vice President ==
Wang left the Politburo Standing Committee and CCDI after the 19th Party Congress in October 2017. In March 2018, he became the Vice President of China, and he is the first vice president without any other job titles in the party since 1998.

During Wang Qishan's term as vice president, he took part in diplomatic activities. Wang attended the inauguration ceremony of South Korean president Yoon Suk-yeol, Filipino president Bongbong Marcos, and Brazilian president Lula da Silva. He also attended the funeral of Elizabeth II.

Wang Qishan retired from politics in March 2023, after Han Zheng succeeded him as Vice President of China.

== Post-retirement ==
On 10 October 2024, he was succeeded by Han Zheng as the honorary president of the Red Cross Society of China. In October 2024, he succeeded Zhu Rongji as the honorary chairman of the advisory board of the Tsinghua University School of Economics and Management.

== Personal life ==
Wang is married to Yao Mingshan, daughter of former first Vice Premier of China Yao Yilin; Wang and Yao do not have children. He is sometimes considered a "princeling" through his marriage.

Yao Mingshan's sister is Yao Mingduan, whose husband is Meng Xuenong, former mayor of Beijing, former governor of Shanxi, and former member of the Standing Committee of the National Committee of the Chinese People's Political Consultative Conference.

U.S. Secretary of the Treasury Henry Paulson said that Wang is "decisive and inquisitive" and "an avid historian, enjoys philosophical debates and has a wicked sense of humor". Paulson writes, "He is a Chinese patriot, but he understands the U.S. and knows that each of our two countries benefits from the other's economic success. And he is bold — he takes on challenges, does things that have never been done before and succeeds. Wang managed the largest bankruptcy restructuring in China's history in 1998 and thereby prevented a banking crisis that could have crippled the country's growth."

Wang is a fan of the American television series House of Cards, and has frequently alluded to the show during anti-corruption conferences; he has said that he was especially fascinated by the role of the party whip. He has also said that he has watched some Korean dramas. Wang said, "Korea dramas are ahead of us, yet the core and soul of Korean dramas [represents] an advancement from [art forms seen] in traditional Chinese culture."

Party political offices
Preceded by Bai Keming	Party Secretary of Hainan; 2002–2003	Succeeded by Wang Xiaofeng
Preceded by He Guoqiang	Secretary of the Central Commission for Discipline Inspection; 2012–2017	Succeeded by Zhao Leji
Assembly seats
Preceded by Bai Keming	Chairman of Hainan People's Congress; 2003	Succeeded by Wang Xiaofeng
Government offices
Preceded by Meng Xuenong	Mayor of Beijing; 2003–2007	Succeeded by Guo Jinlong
Preceded by Li Yuanchao	Vice President of China; 2018–2023	Succeeded by Han Zheng
