= Governor of Hainan =

Governor of the Hainan Provincial People's Government
- 海南省人民政府省长
- National Emblem of China

- Flag of China

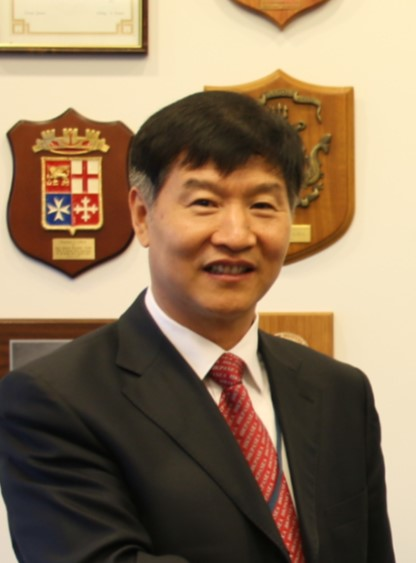
- Incumbent; Liu Xiaoming since 2 April 2023
- Hainan Provincial People's Government
- Type: Governor
- Status: Provincial and ministerial-level official
- Reports to: Hainan Provincial People's Congress and its Standing Committee
- Nominator: Presidium of the Hainan Provincial People's Congress
- Appointer: Hainan Provincial People's Congress
- Term length: Five years, renewable
- Inaugural holder: Liang Xiang
- Formation: September 1988
- Deputy: Deputy Governors; Secretary-General

The governor of Hainan, officially the Governor of the Hainan Provincial People's Government, is the head of Hainan Province and leader of the Hainan Provincial People's Government.

The governor is elected by the Hainan Provincial People's Congress, and responsible to it and its Standing Committee. The governor is a provincial level official and is responsible for the overall decision-making of the provincial government. The governor is assisted by an executive vice governor as well as several vice governors. The governor generally serves as the deputy secretary of the Hainan Provincial Committee of the Chinese Communist Party and as a member of the CCP Central Committee. The governor is the second highest-ranking official in the province after the secretary of the CCP Hainan Committee. The current governor is Liu Xiaoming, who took office on 2 April 2023.

== List of governors ==
=== People's Republic of China ===
No.	Officeholder	Term of office		Party	Ref.
No.	Officeholder	Took office	Left office	Party	Ref.
Governor of the Hainan Provincial People's Government
1	Liang Xiang (1919–1998)	September 1988	September 1989	Chinese Communist Party	
2	Liu Jianfeng (born 1936)	September 1989	February 1993	Chinese Communist Party	
3	Ruan Chongwu (born 1933)	February 1993	February 1998	Chinese Communist Party	
4	Wang Xiaofeng (born 1944)	February 1998	October 2003	Chinese Communist Party	
5	Wei Liucheng (born 1946)	28 February 2004	10 January 2007	Chinese Communist Party	
6	Luo Baoming (born 1952)	9 February 2007	30 August 2011	Chinese Communist Party	
7	Jiang Dingzhi (born 1954)	August 2011	December 2014	Chinese Communist Party	
8	Liu Cigui (born 1955)	4 January 2015	7 April 2017	Chinese Communist Party	
9	Shen Xiaoming (born 1963)	7 April 2017	2 December 2020	Chinese Communist Party	
10	Feng Fei (born 1962)	2 December 2020	2 April 2023	Chinese Communist Party	
11	Liu Xiaoming (born 1964)	2 April 2023	Incumbent	Chinese Communist Party	
