= Xu Shijie =

Chinese Communist revolutionary and politician (1920–1991)

- 许士杰

Party Secretary of Hainan
- In office April 1988 – June 1990
- Preceded by: New office
- Succeeded by: Deng Hongxun

Personal details
- Born: 29 November 1920 Chenghai County, Guangdong, China
- Died: 27 July 1991 (aged 70)
- Party: Chinese Communist Party

Xu Shijie (Chinese: 许士杰; Wade–Giles: Hsü Shih-chieh; 29 November 1920 – 27 July 1991) was a Chinese Communist revolutionary and politician. He held many positions in his native province of Guangdong, including as Chinese Communist Party Committee Secretary of the provincial capital Guangzhou. He came out of retirement in 1988 to serve as the inaugural CCP Committee Secretary of the newly established province and special economic zone of Hainan. In Hainan he worked closely with Governor Liang Xiang to implement reformist policies, but they were both dismissed in the aftermath of the 1989 Tiananmen Square protests and massacre and the fall of the liberal leader Zhao Ziyang. He died soon afterwards in 1991.

== Early life ==
Xu was born on 29 November 1920 in Chenghai County, Guangdong Province. His father died when he was 13, but he continued to receive an education thanks to financial support from his overseas relatives. When Japan invaded China in 1937, he joined the anti-Japanese resistance, and the Chinese Communist Party the following year.

== Career in Guangdong ==
After the founding of the People's Republic of China in 1949, Xu became the first party secretary of Chenghai County. He then served as deputy director of the Guangdong Policy Research Institute, deputy director of the Rural Department of the Guangdong Provincial Party Committee, and party chief of Xinhui County. In 1964, he was transferred to the Hainan Administrative Area (then part of Guangdong Province) to serve as deputy party secretary. He worked there until 1971. In 1981 he was promoted to party chief of Guangzhou, the capital of Guangdong Province, and a member of the Provincial Party Standing Committee of Guangdong. He was known as an inflexible and cautious leader in Guangzhou with regard to reforms. He retired in 1986.

== Career in Hainan ==
In 1987, the national government, led by Zhao Ziyang, Hu Yaobang, and Deng Xiaoping, approved the proposal to establish Hainan Island as a separate province, and the entire province would be a special economic zone (SEZ). In September, Xu Shijie and Liang Xiang, two former Guangdong officials, were taken out of retirement to lead the preparatory committee for the new province. Xu was chosen likely because he had years of experience in Hainan, while Liang had been the successful leader of the Shenzhen SEZ and was a close ally of Zhao.

When Hainan Province was officially established in April 1988, Xu was appointed Chinese Communist Party Committee Secretary, and Liang the first governor. Xu was mainly in charge of party affairs, and Liang took more important initiatives in the province's development. Although Xu had a reputation for being a conservative, in Hainan he was fully supportive of Liang's reforms. He made essential contributions in winning support from local cadres for the new policies, and became one of the few officials from the mainland officials to gain the support of the Hainanese.

Despite his former reputation as a conservative official, in Hainan Xu became one of the most liberal provincial party chiefs in the country. He proclaimed that "The policies [of the central government] only prohibit us from doing a few things, whereas we can do everything else. We in Hainan have the power to do everything not proscribed." He also wrote that state-owned enterprises could be leased out, turned into joint-stock companies, accept foreign investors, or even sold.

However, in the aftermath of the 1989 Tiananmen Square protests and massacre, Liang Xiang was dismissed for being an ally of the fallen liberal leader Zhao Ziyang. He was disciplined in September 1989 and almost went to jail. Although Xu was not close to Zhao, he also had to leave his post in June 1990 because he had supported Liang's policies. He held on to the post of Chairman of the Hainan Provincial People's Congress, but died soon afterwards in July 1991.

Liang and Xu were replaced by Liu Jianfeng and Deng Hongxun, respectively. The two new leaders of Hainan not only did not share the vision of their predecessors, they were so antagonistic to each other that they weakened the position of the fledgling province, and the national government's focus of reforms shifted to Shanghai after 1992.

== Personal life ==
Xu was also a writer and poet, and began publishing in 1945 under the pen names Yajie (亚杰) and Huichui (灰槌). He became a member of the China Writers Association in 1988, and served as vice-president of the China Poetry Association. He published several collections of his poems and essays.
