= Li Boyong =

Chinese politician

- 李伯勇

Minister of Labor
- In office March 1993 – March 1998
- Premier: Li Peng
- Preceded by: Ruan Chongwu
- Succeeded by: Zhang Zuoji

Personal details
- Born: May 1932 (age 94) Harbin, Heilongjiang, Manchukuo
- Party: Chinese Communist Party
- Education: Harbin Institute of Technology; Zhukovsky Air Force Engineering Academy

Li Boyong (Chinese: 李伯勇; pinyin: Lǐ Bóyǒng; born May 1932) is a Chinese politician who served as minister of labor from 1993 to 1998.

He was a member of the 14th Central Committee of the Chinese Communist Party. He was a member of the Standing Committee of the 9th National People's Congress.

== Biography ==
Li was born in Harbin, Heilongjiang, Manchukuo, in May 1932, while his ancestral home in Tianjin. In 1948, he enrolled at Harbin Institute of Technology and before long he became an interpreter in the People's Liberation Army Air Force. He joined the Chinese Communist Party (CCP) in February 1957. In 1958, he went on to the Zhukovsky Air Force Engineering Academy, where he majored in airplane engine. After graduation, he was despatched to the 3rd Design Department of the 1st Branch of the 5th Academy of the Ministry of National Defense and was reassigned to the 7th Ministry of Machinery Industry in 1973. In 1984, he was appointed president of the China Academy of Launch Vehicle Technology, in addition to serving as chief engineer of the Ministry of Aerospace Industry. During his term in office, hr presided over the development of the Long March rockets engines. In 1986, he became vice minister of labor, rising to minister in 1993. He also served as deputy party secretary and vice governor of Sichuan from 1990 to 1993. In March 1998, he took office as vice chairperson of the National People's Congress Law Committee.

Government offices
Preceded by Ruan Chongwu	Minister of Labor; 1993–1998	Succeeded by Zhang Zuoji
