= Yang Yuanyuan =

Chinese pilot, aviation executive, regulator, and politician

- 杨元元

Director of the Civil Aviation Administration of China
- In office May 2002 – December 2007
- Preceded by: Liu Jianfeng
- Succeeded by: Li Jiaxiang

Personal details
- Born: August 1950 (age 76) Heyang County, Shaanxi, China
- Party: Chinese Communist Party
- Education: CAAC Senior Flight Institute

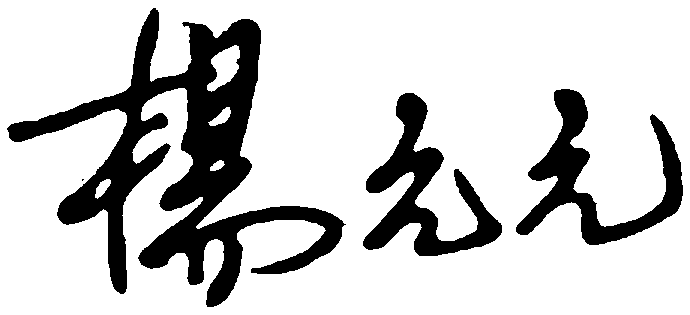
Yang Yuanyuan's signature

Yang Yuanyuan (Chinese: 杨元元; born August 1950) is a Chinese retired pilot, aviation executive, aviation and safety regulator, and politician. He served as Director of the Civil Aviation Administration of China (CAAC) from 2002 to 2007 and deputy director of the State Administration of Work Safety from 2007 to 2015. He was awarded the Lifetime Achievement Award from the Flight Safety Foundation in 2006 for the significant reduction in China's aviation accident rate under his leadership.

== Biography ==
Yang was born August 1950 in Heyang County, Shaanxi Province. He is the son of Yang Yindong, a former director of the Taiwan Affairs Office of the Central Committee of the Chinese Communist Party. He joined the People's Liberation Army (PLA) in September 1966, and the Chinese Communist Party in February 1968.

He graduated from the CAAC Advanced Flight Institute (now Civil Aviation Flight University of China) in 1969, and is a first-grade pilot. He then worked as a flight instructor in both the PLA Air Force and the CAAC.

After 1981, he worked for the CAAC as a flight inspector and pilot. In December 1989, he became the deputy chief pilot of the CAAC Guangzhou Regional Administration, the predecessor of China Southern Airlines. He became deputy chief pilot of China Southern Airlines in 1993, and chief pilot in 1996. In April 1998, he became vice-president of China Southern Airlines.

In March 1999, Yang was appointed deputy director of the CAAC, and in May 2002, he succeeded Liu Jianfeng as director. He served in the position for more than five years until December 2007. During his tenure, China's civil aviation grew at an unprecedented rate. Its commercial air fleet almost tripled, yet its aviation accident rate plummeted from 2.5 accidents per million flight hours to 0.5. Consequently, Yang was awarded the Lifetime Achievement Award from the Flight Safety Foundation-Boeing Aviation Safety in 2006. To strengthen safety, he mandated the consolidation of state-owned airlines into the "big three", so that each airline would have a larger pool of technical specialists. He also established the CAAC Flight Standards Training Center and the CAAC Civil Aviation Safety Academy.

In December 2007, he was appointed a minister-level deputy director of the State Administration of Work Safety. He served in that position for eight years until December 2015, when he reached the age of 65.

Yang was a member of the 16th and the 17th Central Committee of the Chinese Communist Party.
