= Jiang Dingzhi =

Chinese politician

- 蒋定之
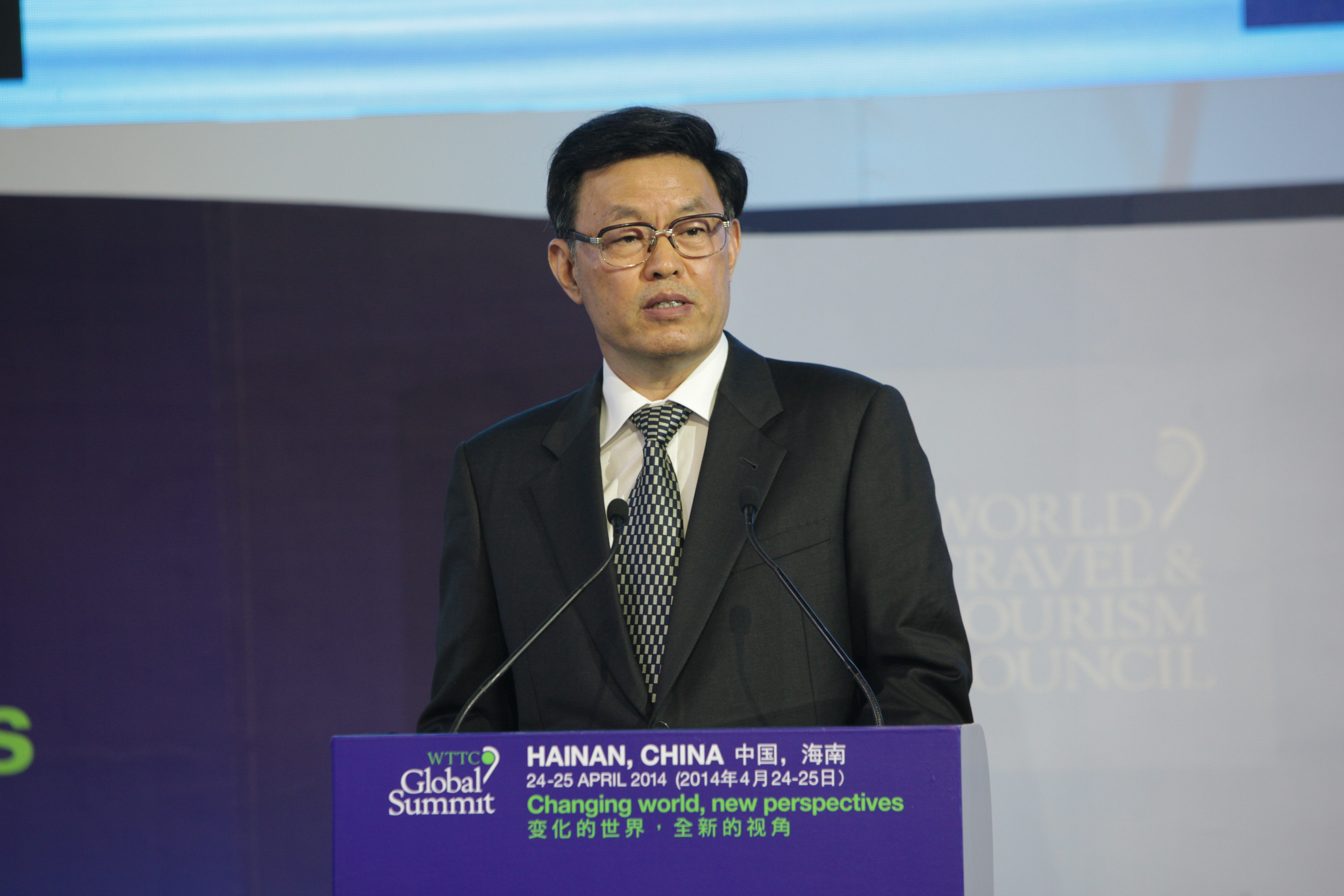

Governor of Hainan
- In office August 2011 – December 2014
- Preceded by: Luo Baoming
- Succeeded by: Liu Cigui

Personal details
- Born: September 1954 (age 72) Liyang, Jiangsu, China
- Party: Chinese Communist Party
- Education: Nanjing University of Science and Technology

Jiang Dingzhi (Chinese: 蒋定之; born September 1954) is a Chinese politician and current Chairman of the Jiangsu People's Political Consultative Conference (zhengxie). He holds a master's degree in Engineering from Nanjing University of Science and Technology.

Jiang has successively served as the Party Secretary of the city of Wuxi, Vice Governor of Jiangsu province, Vice Chairman of the China Banking Regulatory Commission, Governor of Hainan province, and, since December 2014, Vice-Chairman of the Jiangsu Provincial People's Congress.

== Career ==
Jiang Dingzhi was born in September 1954 in Liyang, Jiangsu. He joined the Chinese Communist Party in July 1978. He spent most of his career in his native Jiangsu province, serving as the Party Secretary of the county-level city of Yangzhong from 1994 to 1996. From 2000 to 2003 he was the Party Chief of Wuxi, a major prefecture-level city near Shanghai. In February 2003 he was promoted to Executive Vice Governor of Jiangsu, and a member of the provincial Party Standing Committee.

In November 2005 Jiang was transferred to the national government to become the Vice Chairman of the China Banking Regulatory Commission. He held the position until December 2010, when he was transferred to southern Hainan province to serve as a Vice Governor. He was promoted to acting governor in August 2011, and was officially elected Governor by the Hainan Provincial People's Congress in February 2012, in addition to taking on the role of deputy party chief and member of the provincial Party Standing Committee.

Following the Third Plenum of the 18th Central Committee held in late 2013, Jiang disappeared from public view for several weeks. Chinese-language media speculated that he was implicated in the Zhou Yongkang case; he delegated some of his tasks as governor to Executive Vice Governor Tan Li (Tan himself was detained and investigated several months later). In December 2014, Jiang left his post as Governor of Hainan to take on the office of Vice-Chairman of the Jiangsu Provincial People's Congress; this was seen as a demotion, though some sources suggested he went home to recover from illness. In 2017, he became Chairman of the Jiangsu People's Political Consultative Conference, a largely symbolic advisory body.

Jiang is a member of the 18th Central Committee of the Chinese Communist Party.

Political offices
Preceded by Luo Baoming	Governor of Hainan; 2011–2014	Succeeded by Liu Cigui
Party political offices
Preceded by Hong Jinxin	Party Secretary of Wuxi; 2000–2003	Succeeded by Wang Rong
