= Ruan Chongwu =

Chinese politician

- 阮崇武

Party Secretary of Hainan
- In office January 1993 – February 1998
- Preceded by: Deng Hongxun
- Succeeded by: Du Qinglin

Governor of Hainan
- In office February 1993 – February 1998
- Preceded by: Liu Jianfeng
- Succeeded by: Wang Xiaofeng

Minister of Labor
- In office 1989–1993
- Premier: Li Peng
- Preceded by: Luo Gan
- Succeeded by: Li Boyong

Minister of Public Security
- In office 6 September 1985 – 11 April 1987
- Premier: Zhao Ziyang
- Preceded by: Liu Fuzhi
- Succeeded by: Tao Siju

Personal details
- Born: May 1933 (age 93) Huai'an County, Hebei, China
- Party: Chinese Communist Party
- Education: Moscow Automotive College

Ruan Chongwu (Chinese: 阮崇武; pinyin: Ruǎn Chóngwǔ; born May 1933 in Huai'an County, Hebei) is a politician of the People's Republic of China. He is the son of Ruan Muhan.

== Biography ==
He graduated from the Mechanical Engineering Department of Moscow Automotive College in 1957.

He was the Minister of Public Security from September 1985 to March 1987, the Minister of Labor from 1989 to 1993, and the Governor of Hainan from 1993 to 1998.

Ruan was the member of the 13th and 14th Central Committee of the Chinese Communist Party from 1987 to 1997.

Government offices
Preceded by Liu Fuzhi	Minister of Public Security; 1985–1987	Succeeded by Wang Fang
Preceded by Luo Gan	Minister of Labor; 1989–1993	Succeeded by Li Boyong
Political offices
Preceded by Liu Jianfeng	Governor of Hainan; 1993–1998	Succeeded by Wang Xiaofeng
Preceded by Deng Hongxun	Party Secretary of Hainan; 1993–1998	Succeeded by Du Qinglin
