= Bai Keming =

Chinese politician

Bai Keming (Chinese: 白克明; pinyin: Bái Kèmíng; born October 1943 in Jingbian County, Yulin, Shaanxi) graduated from the department of missile engineering at Harbin Institute of Military Engineering. He joined the Chinese Communist Party (CCP) in 1975, and was a member of the central committee of the 16th CCP National Congress. He was the chief officer of the People's Daily newspaper. He formerly served as the secretary of the CCP Hainan Committee and Hebei Committee. He was a member of the standing committee of the 11th National People's Congress, and he is the former director of the commission of education, science, culture and health of the NPC.

== Political experience ==
=== Early years ===
Bai Keming is the son of Bai Jian, a former vice minister of First Ministry of Mechanics. During the Cultural Revolution, between 1968 and 1970, he was transferred to the "Five Seven Cadre School" in the Heilongjiang military region. Later he was assigned to the science and technology office in the bureau of metallurgy and geology in Heilongjiang Province. In 1970, he was transferred to the second department at Ha'erbin Institute of Naval Engineering and became a lecturer. He returned to Shaanxi in 1973, and served in the scientific study department at the national defense engineering office as well as the second bureau of mechanics in Shaanxi. During the period February 1977 to May 1978 he worked in the second ministry of mechanics.

=== Retirement ===
Political offices
Preceded by Du Qinglin	Secretary of the CCP Hainan Committee; 2001–2002	Succeeded by Wang Qishan
