= Liu Jianfeng (PRC) =

Chinese engineer and politician

- 刘剑锋

Director of the Civil Aviation Administration of China
- In office June 1998 – May 2002
- Preceded by: Chen Guangyi
- Succeeded by: Yang Yuanyuan

Governor of Hainan
- In office September 1989 – January 1993
- Preceded by: Liang Xiang
- Succeeded by: Ruan Chongwu

Personal details
- Born: June 1936 (age 90) Tianjin, China
- Party: Chinese Communist Party
- Education: Kiev Polytechnic Institute

Liu Jianfeng (Chinese: 刘剑锋; born June 1936) is a retired Chinese engineer and politician. From 1989 to 1993 he was Governor of Hainan Province, where he had a highly antagonistic relationship with the Chinese Communist Party Committee Secretary Deng Hongxun. He also served as Director of the Civil Aviation Administration of China and Vice-Minister of the Ministry of Electronics Industry.

== Early life and career ==
Liu was born in June 1936 in Tianjin. In 1956, he joined the Chinese Communist Party. In 1961 he graduated from the radio engineering department of the Kiev Polytechnic Institute in Ukraine, USSR. After returning to China he began working for the Fourth Ministry of Machine Building.

From 1981 to 1984 he was director of the No. 1425 Research Institute of the Fourth Ministry of Machine Building. In 1984, he was appointed vice-minister of the Ministry of Electronics Industry and became associated with Li Peng, then a vice-premier whose portfolio included the electronics industry.

== Governor of Hainan ==
In the aftermath of the Tiananmen Square protests of 1989, the top leaders of Hainan Province, Xu Shijie and Liang Xiang, were dismissed because Liang was an ally of the reformist national leader Zhao Ziyang and Xu supported Liang's policies. Liu was selected to replace Governor Liang Xiang on the recommendation of Premier Li Peng. He was formally appointed governor on 14 September 1989, but effectively took over the position before that. In a meeting of provincial party leaders on 4 September, he emphasized that provincial cadres should implement the policy of the central government "to the letter".

However, Liu was unable to work together with the Chinese Communist Party Committee Secretary of Hainan, Deng Hongxun, who was associated with the central leaders Jiang Zemin and Qiao Shi. From 1990 to 1992, the two top officials of Hainan clashed fiercely, hindering the young province's development. By the end of 1992, Deng and Liu were trying to drive each other out of the province. A high-ranking official, Li Shanyou, accused Liu of visiting a prostitute. Li was imprisoned after the accusation was proven false, and Liu launched a counter-investigation to find the instigator, rumoured to be Deng. Their infighting became an embarrassment to the central government, which transferred both of them to Beijing in January 1993, and replaced them with a single official, Ruan Chongwu.

== Later career ==
After leaving Hainan, Liu again served as vice-minister of the Ministry of Electronics Industry from 1993 to 1998. After a brief stint as vice-minister of the Ministry of Industry and Information Technology from March to June 1998, he was appointed Director of the Civil Aviation Administration of China. He served in that position until May 2002, when he reached retirement age and was replaced by Yang Yuanyuan. From 2003 to 2008, he served as Subcommittee Chairman of Foreign Affairs of the Chinese People's Political Consultative Conference (CPPCC).

Liu was a member of the 14th and the 15th Central Committee of the Chinese Communist Party.
