= Liu Cigui =

Chinese politician

- 刘赐贵
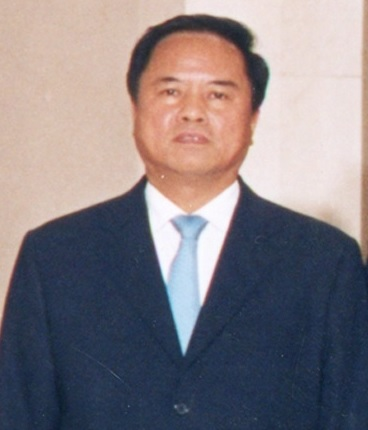

Party Secretary of Hainan
- In office 1 April 2017 – 30 November 2020
- Preceded by: Luo Baoming
- Succeeded by: Shen Xiaoming

Governor of Hainan
- In office 4 January 2015 – 7 April 2017
- Preceded by: Jiang Dingzhi
- Succeeded by: Shen Xiaoming

Personal details
- Born: September 18, 1955 (age 70) Hui'an County, Fujian, China
- Party: Chinese Communist Party

Liu Cigui (Chinese: 刘赐贵; Pe̍h-ōe-jī: Lâu Sù-kùi; born 18 September 1955) is a Chinese politician. He was the Party Secretary of Hainan from 2017 to 2020. His former positions include Governor of Hainan, Director of the State Oceanic Administration and China Coast Guard and Mayor of Xiamen and Longyan in Fujian province.

== Life and career ==
Liu Cigui was born on 18 September 1955 in Hui'an County, Quanzhou, Fujian province. In 1973, during the late Cultural Revolution, he worked as a sent-down youth (zhiqing) in Shaowu County's Hongdun Commune.

Starting in October 1976, Liu worked at various levels of government in Fujian, first as the Communist Youth League secretary of Hongdun Commune and then rising to deputy Communist Party chief of Shaowu in 1983. He became the deputy party chief of Guangze County in February 1986 and party chief in October 1988. In March 1993, Liu became the deputy secretary of the Communist Youth League of Fujian. From 1997 to 2000, he worked in the prefecture-level city of Putian, serving as its executive deputy mayor starting in August 1998. He was appointed director of the province's Oceanic and Fishery Bureau in March 2000, studying oceanography at the graduate school of Xiamen University from September 2000 to July 2002 while on the job. In May 2002, Liu was appointed acting mayor and then mayor of Longyan. From 2007 to 2011, he served as mayor of the sub-provincial city of Xiamen.

On 1 February 2011, Liu Cigui was appointed Director of the State Oceanic Administration, part of the Ministry of Land and Resources. In December 2014, he was appointed deputy party chief of Hainan province and, on 4 January 2015, he was appointed Acting Governor of Hainan, replacing the outgoing governor Jiang Dingzhi.

On 1 April 2017, Liu Cigui was appointed as the Party Secretary of Hainan.

Liu was a member of the 18th Central Commission for Discipline Inspection (CCDI) and the 19th Central Committee of the Chinese Communist Party.

Political offices
Preceded by Jiang Dingzhi	Governor of Hainan; 2015–2017	Succeeded by Shen Xiaoming
Party political offices
Preceded by Luo Baoming	Party Secretary of Hainan; 2017– 2020	Succeeded by Shen Xiaoming
