= Hainan Provincial Committee of the Chinese People's Political Consultative Conference =

Hainan Provincial Committee of the Chinese People's Political Consultative Conference 中国人民政治协商会议海南省委员会
- 8th
- Emblem of the Chinese People's Political Consultative Conference

Type
- Type: United front organ Constitutional convention (Historical); Legislature (Historical) of Chinese People's Political Consultative Conference

History
- Founded: August 1988; 37 years ago
- Preceded by: Hainan Provincial People's Congress Consultative Committee

Leadership
- Chairperson: Li Rongcan

Website
- www.hainanzx.gov.cn

Chinese name
- Simplified Chinese: 中国人民政治协商会议海南省委员会
- Traditional Chinese: 中國人民政治協商會議海南省委員會
Transcriptions
Standard Mandarin
- Hanyu Pinyin: Zhōngguó Rénmín Zhèngzhì Xiéshāng Huìyì Hǎinánshěng Wěiyuánhuì

Abbreviation
- Simplified Chinese: 海南省政协
- Traditional Chinese: 海南省政協
- Literal meaning: CPPCC Hainan Provincial Committee
Transcriptions
Standard Mandarin
- Hanyu Pinyin: Hǎinánshěng Zhèngxié

The Hainan Provincial Committee of the Chinese People's Political Consultative Conference (Chinese: 中国人民政治协商会议海南省委员会) is the advisory body and a local organization of the Chinese People's Political Consultative Conference in Hainan, China. It is supervised and directed by the Hainan Provincial Committee of the Chinese Communist Party.

== History ==
The Hainan Provincial Committee of the Chinese People's Political Consultative Conference was founded in August 1988, while Hainan was upgraded to a province.

== Term ==
=== 1st ===
- Term: August 1988–January 1993
- Chairperson: Yao Wenxu
- Vice Chairpersons: Zhang Jintao, Zhou Zheng, Wang Yuefeng, Zhou Song, Chen Kegong, Hu Kai, Li Mingtian, Lin Hongzao, Chen Hong, Zou Erkang, Wang Huifeng
- Secretary-General: Huang Zigui

=== 2nd ===
- Term: January 1993–April 1998
- Chairperson: Yao Wenxu (January 1993–February 1993) → Chen Yuyi (February 1993–April 1998)
- Vice Chairpersons: Wang Yuefeng (April 1991–February 1996), Zhou Song, Hu Kai, Li Mingtian, Lin Hongzao, Chen Hong, Wang Huifeng, Lin Mingyu, Wang Jiaxian
- Secretary-General: Lin Mingyu (concurrently)

=== 3rd ===
- Term: April 1998–January 2003
- Chairperson: Chen Yuyi
- Vice Chairpersons: Wang Guangxian, Zhou Song, Xiao Ceneng, Li Mingtian, Wang Huifeng, Lin Anbin, Kang Tiebao, Fu Qihao, Lin Qifeng, Chen Jiayue, Hong Shouxiang
- Secretary-General: Chen Quanyi

=== 4th ===
- Term: January 2003–January 2008
- Chairperson: Wang Guangxian
- Vice Chairpersons: Hong Shouxiang, Li Mingtian, Wu Kuiguang, Wang Huifeng, Lin Anbin, Kang Tiebao, Fu Qihao, Lin Qifeng, Xiao Ruohai
- Secretary-General: Qiu Guohu

=== 5th ===
- Term: January 2008–February 2012
- Chairperson: Zhong Wen (January 2008–February 2011) → Yu Xun (February 2011–February 2012)
- Vice Chairpersons: Zhang Haiguo, Qiu Dequn, Zhang Lifu (January 2008–February 2011), Zhao Lisha, Wang Lu, Shi Yiyun, Chen Li (January 2010–February 2012), Wang Yutian (January 2010–February 2012), Wang Yingji (February 2011–February 2012)
- Secretary-General: Li Yingji

=== 6th ===
- Term: February 2012–January 2018
- Chairperson: Yu Xun
- Vice Chairpersons: Chen Cheng (February 2012–January 2016), Lin Fanglue (February 2012–September 2016), Zhao Lisha (February 2012–February 2017), Shi Yiyun, Chen Li, Wang Yutian (February 2012–April 2016), Wang Yingji, Ding Shangqing, Chen Ci (February 2015–July 2016), Wang Yong (January 2016–January 2018), Li Fulin (February 2017–January 2018)
- Secretary-General: Li Yanjing (February 2012–February 2017) → Wang Xiong (February 2017–January 2018)

=== 7th ===
- Term: January 2018–January 2023
- Chairperson: Mao Wanchun
- Vice Chairpersons: Ma Yongxia (–January 2022), Li Guoliang, Shi Yiyun, Wang Yong (–August 2020), Wu Yanjun, Chen Malin, Meng Xiaoling, Hou Maofeng, Liu Dengshan (January 2021–January 2023), Xiao Yingzi (January 2022–January 2023)
- Secretary-General: Wang Xiong (January 2018–August 2020) → Chen Chao (January 2021–January 2023)

=== 8th ===
- Term: January 2023–2028
- Chairperson: Li Rongcan
- Vice Chairpersons: Xiao Yingzi, Li Guoliang, Chen Malin, Meng Xiaoling, Hou Maofeng, Yuan Guangping, Luo Qingming, Liu Yanling, Yang Xiaohe (January 2024–)
- Secretary-General: Luo Shixiang
