= Shen Xiaoming =

Chinese politician

- 沈晓明
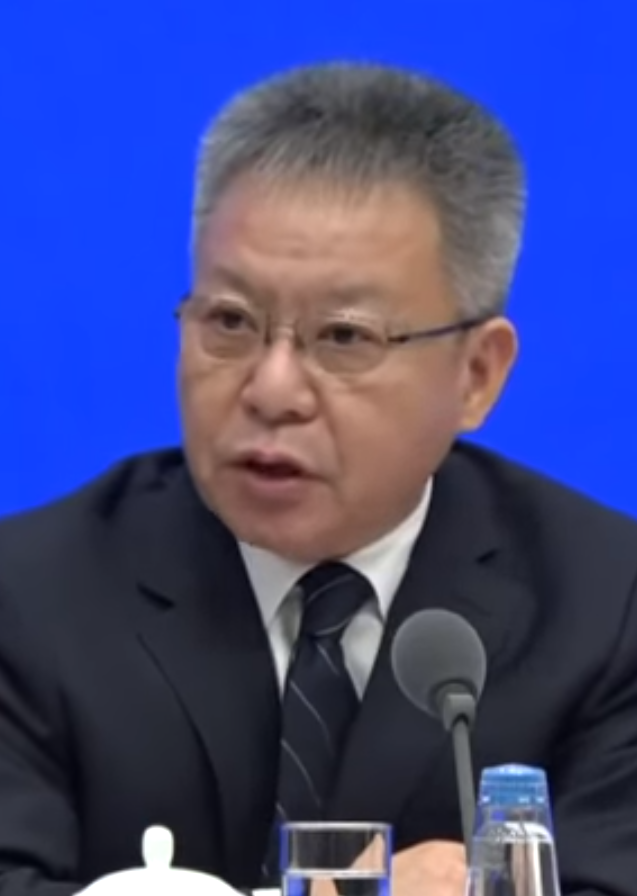
- Shen in 2019

Party Secretary of Hunan
- In office 14 March 2023 – 24 October 2026
- Deputy: Mao Weiming (governor)
- Preceded by: Zhang Qingwei
- Succeeded by: Wang Zhijun

Party Secretary of Hainan
- In office 1 December 2020 – 14 March 2023
- Deputy: Feng Fei (Governor)
- Preceded by: Liu Cigui
- Succeeded by: Feng Fei

Governor of Hainan
- In office 7 April 2017 – 2 December 2020
- Preceded by: Liu Cigui
- Succeeded by: Feng Fei

Party Secretary of Pudong New Area
- In office May 2013 – September 2016
- Preceded by: Xu Lin
- Succeeded by: Weng Zuliang

Personal details
- Born: May 1963 (age 63) Shangyu County, Zhejiang
- Party: Chinese Communist Party

Shen Xiaoming (Chinese: 沈晓明; born May 1963) is a Chinese politician who is previously served as the Chinese Communist Party Committee Secretary of Hunan.

A pediatrician by training, Shen rose through the ranks in the health and education bureaucracy of Shanghai. He successively served as party chief of Pudong and vice minister of education. From 2017 to 2020, he served as the Governor of Hainan, and as Hainan's party secretary from 2020 to 2023.

== Life and career ==
Shen was born in Shangyu County, Zhejiang Province. He attended Wenzhou Medical College and obtained a degree in pediatrics. He then attended Shanghai Jiaotong University and obtained a doctoral degree in pediatric medicine. After graduating he became the deputy head and then head of the Xinhua Hospital, then president of the Second Medical University of Shanghai, then executive vice president of Shanghai Jiaotong University. He then entered the commission on education and health of Shanghai.

In January 2008, he was named vice mayor of Shanghai. In May 2013, he was named party chief of Pudong, joining the municipal Standing Committee two months later. On April 8, 2015, he succeeded Ai Baojun to become head administrator of the Shanghai Free-Trade Zone.

In October 2016, Shen was appointed as the Deputy Minister of Education. Shen was appointed as the acting Governor of Hainan in April 2017. In December 2020, Shen was appointed as the Party Secretary of Hainan.

In March 2023, Shen was appointed as the Party Secretary of Hunan. He was stepped down the post due to reaching the retiring age on October 24, 2026. On 6 November 2026, he was appointed as the vice chairman of the National People's Congress Social Development Affairs Committee at the 25th meeting of the Standing Committee of the 14th National People's Congress.

Political offices
Preceded by Liu Cigui	Governor of Hainan; 2017–2020	Succeeded by Feng Fei
Party political offices
Preceded by Xu Lin	Party Secretary of Pudong; 2013–2016	Succeeded by Weng Zuliang
Preceded by Liu Cigui	Party Secretary of Hainan; 2020–2023	Succeeded by Feng Fei
Preceded by Zhang Qingwei	Party Secretary of Hunan; 2023–2026	Succeeded by Wang Zhijun
