= Hainan Provincial Committee of the Chinese Communist Party =

Hainan Provincial Committee of the Chinese Communist Party 中国共产党海南省委员会

Overview
- Type: Highest decision-making organ when Hainan Provincial Congress is not in session
- Elected by: Hainan Provincial Congress
- Length of term: Five years
- Term limits: None
- First convocation: October 1921; 103 years ago

Leadership
- Secretary: Feng Fei
- Executive organ: Standing Committee
- Inspection organ: Commission for Discipline Inspection

Hainan Provincial Committee of the Chinese Communist Party
- Simplified Chinese: 中国共产党海南省委员会
- Traditional Chinese: 中國共產黨海南省委員會
Transcriptions
Standard Mandarin
- Hanyu Pinyin: Zhōngguó Gòngchǎndǎng Hǎinánshěng Wěiyuánhuì

Abbreviation
- Chinese: 中共海南省委
- Literal meaning: CCP Hainan Provincial Committee
Transcriptions
Standard Mandarin
- Hanyu Pinyin: Zhōnggòng Hǎinánshěng Wěi

The Hainan Provincial Committee of the Chinese Communist Party is the provincial committee of the Chinese Communist Party (CCP) in Hainan, China, and the province's top authority. The committee secretary is the highest ranking post in the province. The current secretary is Feng Fei.

== Organizations ==
The organization of the Hainan Provincial Committee includes:

- General Office

=== Functional departments ===
- Organization Department
- Publicity Department
- United Front Work Department
- Political and Legal Affairs Commission

=== Offices ===
- Policy Research Office
- Office of the Cyberspace Affairs Commission
- Office of the Foreign Affairs Commission
- Office of the Deepening Reform Commission
- Office of the Institutional Organization Commission
- Office of the Military-civilian Fusion Development Committee
- Taiwan Work Office
- Office of the Leading Group for Inspection Work
- Bureau of Veteran Cadres

=== Dispatched institutions ===
- Working Committee of the Organs Directly Affiliated to the Hainan Provincial Committee

=== Organizations directly under the Committee ===
- Hainan Party School
- Hainan Daily Newspaper Group
- Hainan Institute of Socialism
- Party History Research Office
- Hainan Provincial Archives

=== Organization managed by the work organization ===
- Confidential Bureau

== Leadership ==
=== Party Committees ===
The 8th Provincial Committee (April 2022–)

- Secretary: Shen Xiaoming (until March 2023), Feng Fei (from March 2023)
- Deputy Secretaries: Feng Fei (until March 2023), Xu Qifang (until October 2022), Liu Xiaoming (from April 2023), Shen Danyang (June 2023–September 2024)
- Standing Committee members: Shen Xiaoming (until March 2023), Feng Fei, Xu Qifang (until October 2022), Chen Guomeng, Shen Danyang, Feng Zhonghua (until June 2024), Zhou Hongbo (until December 2024), Wang Bin, Luo Zengbin (until December 2024, investigated for suspected serious violations of discipline and law), Yang Xiaohe (until January 2024), Miao Yanhong (until June 2024), Bater, Wang Peijie (from June 2022), Liu Xiaoming (from April 2023), Ni Qiang (October 2023), Na Yunde (from August 2024), Yin Libo (from September 2024), Wang Qiyang (from December 2024), Fan Shaojun (from January 2025)

== See also ==
- Politics of Hainan
