= Feng Fei (politician) =

Chinese politician

- 冯飞
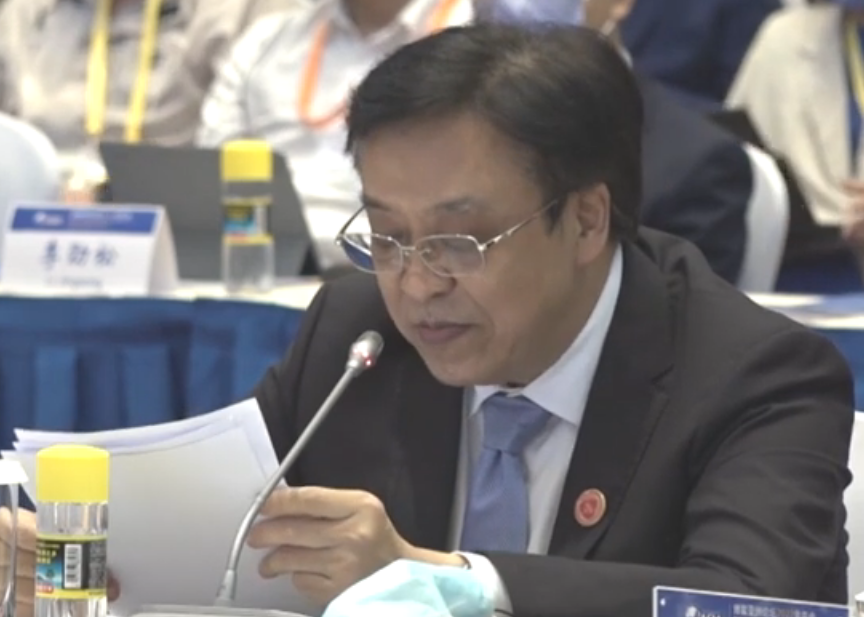

Party Secretary of Hainan
- Incumbent
- Assumed office 14 March 2023
- Preceded by: Shen Xiaoming

Chairman of the Standing Committee of the Hainan Provincial People's Congress
- Incumbent
- Assumed office May 2023
- Preceded by: Shen Xiaoming

Governor of Hainan
- In office 2 December 2020 – 2 April 2023
- Preceded by: Shen Xiaoming
- Succeeded by: Liu Xiaoming

Personal details
- Born: December 1962 (age 63) Duchang County, Jiangxi, China
- Party: Chinese Communist Party
- Education: Tianjin University

Chinese name
- Simplified Chinese: 冯飞
- Traditional Chinese: 馮飛
Transcriptions
Standard Mandarin
- Hanyu Pinyin: Féng Fēi

Feng Fei (Chinese: 冯飞, born December 1962) is a Chinese politician, serving as the Party Secretary of Hainan since 2023. He was the former governor of Hainan from 2020 to 2023. He serves as the chairman of the Standing Committee of the Hainan Provincial People's Congress, director of the Provincial Financial Committee, and first secretary of the Party Committee of the Hainan Military District. He is a member of the 20th Central Committee of the Chinese Communist Party.

== Biography ==
Feng was born in December 1962 in Duchang County, Jiangxi Province. He commenced his studies at Tianjin University in 1981, specializing in power systems and automation within the Department of Electrical Power and Automation Engineering. Upon finishing his undergraduate studies in 1985, he pursued postgraduate education at Tianjin University, obtaining a master's degree in 1988 and a doctorate in engineering in 1991.

In October 1993, he commenced his tenure at the Development Research Center, where he occupied various roles during the subsequent decade. He first held the position of assistant researcher at the Department of Technological Economics and was then elevated to associate researcher in 1994. From 1995 until 1997, he held the position of deputy director of the Second Research Office within the Department of Technological Economics. In 1997, he was elevated to the position of Director of the same office at the division level, while also serving as an associate researcher. From 1998 to 2004, he shifted to industrial economics, ultimately holding the positions of deputy director and subsequently Director of the Department of Industrial Economics at the DRC. From 2004 to January 2014, Feng served as the Director of the Department of industry Economics, overseeing policy research and providing counsel on industry development and restructuring plans.

In January 2014, Feng was designated as the Director-General of the Department of Industrial Policy within the Ministry of Industry and Information Technology (MIIT). In October 2015, he was elevated to Vice Minister of MIIT and appointed as a member of the ministry's Party Leadership Group.

In August 2016, Feng was reassigned to Zhejiang Province, where he assumed the role of vice governor. In April 2017, he was appointed to the Standing Committee of the Zhejiang Provincial Committee of the Chinese Communist Party while concurrently serving as Vice Governor, acquiring expertise in provincial governance and economic strategy.

In November 2020, Feng was designated as the Deputy Party Secretary of Hainan Province. In December 2020, he was appointed Acting Governor of Hainan and Secretary of the Provincial Government Party Leadership Group. He was officially elected governor in January 2021.

Feng held the position of Governor of Hainan until March 2023, when he was designated as Party Secretary of Hainan, the highest political office in the province. In April 2023, he was chosen Chairman of the Standing Committee of the Hainan Provincial People's Congress.

Government offices
Preceded by Yuan Jiajun	Executive Vice Governor of Zhejiang; 2017–2020	Succeeded by Chen Jinbiao
Preceded by Shen Xiaoming	Governor of Hainan; 2020–2023	Succeeded by Liu Xiaoming
Party political offices
Preceded by Shen Xiaoming	Party Secretary of Hainan; 2023–present	Incumbent
