= Liu Xiaoming (politician) =

Chinese politician

- 刘小明
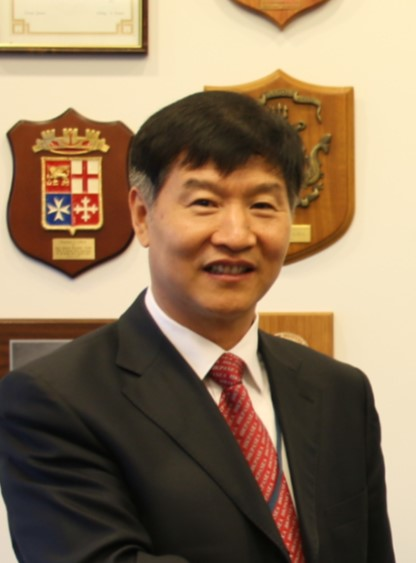
- Liu in 2011

Governor of Hainan
- Incumbent
- Assumed office 2 April 2023
- Party Secretary: Feng Fei
- Preceded by: Feng Fei

Deputy Party Secretary of Guangxi
- In office March 2021 – April 2023
- Party Secretary: Liu Ning
- Preceded by: Sun Dawei

Personal details
- Born: September 1964 (age 61) Yangzhong County, Jiangsu, China
- Party: Communist

Chinese name
- Simplified Chinese: 刘小明
- Traditional Chinese: 劉小明
Transcriptions
Standard Mandarin
- Hanyu Pinyin: Liú Xiǎomíng

Liu Xiaoming (Chinese: 刘小明; born September 1964) is a Chinese politician who has been the Governor of Hainan since 2023, after initially serving in an acting role. Prior to his tenure as governor he was a member of the Beijing Municipal Transportation Commission and Ministry of Transport. He has been a member of the Chinese Communist Party's committees in Guangxi and Hainan.

== Early life and education ==
Liu Xiaoming was born in Yangzhong, China, in September 1964. He is Han Chinese.

== Career ==
Xiaoming became an assistant to the president of Beijing University of Technology and retained that position as of 2021. In 2000, he became vice president of the Beijing University of Technology.

Xiaoming joined the Beijing Municipal Transportation Commission in 2003, and served as deputy director and as a member of the party leadership group before becoming director and party secretary in 2008. Xiaoming joined the Ministry of Transport in 2014, and became vice minister in 2016.

On 26 March 2021, Xiaoming was appointed as deputy secretary of the Guangxi Zhuang Autonomous Regional Committee of the Chinese Communist Party. He was a delegate to the 20th National Congress of the Chinese Communist Party and was one of 205 members of the 20th Central Committee of the Chinese Communist Party.

In 2023, Xiaoming became deputy secretary of the Hainan Provincial Committee of the Chinese Communist Party. On 2 April 2023, he was appointed as acting Governor of Hainan. He was elected governor by the Seventh People's Congress of Hainan on 31 May.

Government offices
Preceded by Feng Fei	Governor of Hainan; 2023–present	Incumbent
Party political offices
Preceded by Sun Dawei	Deputy Party Secretary of Guangxi; March 2021–April 2023	Succeeded by TBA
