= Liang Xiang =

Chinese politician (1919–1998)

Liang Xiang (Chinese: 梁湘; pinyin: Liáng Xiāng; 1919 – 13 December 1998) was a politician of the People's Republic of China. He was originally from the city of Kaiping, in Guangdong province. He graduated from Beijing Normal University, and was a representative in the fifth, sixth, and seventh National People's Congresses.

== Biography ==
Liang joined the Chinese Communist Party in 1936 at the age of 17. He then served as the deputy director of the Central Party School of the Chinese Communist Party. He served as the CCP Committee Secretary of Xi'an County in Jilin province. He rose first to the position of head of Xi'an county, and then to the CCP committee secretary of the Chaoyang city region. From January 1955 to August 1964, he served as the vice-mayor of Guangzhou. After leaving his post there, Liang served as the CCP Deputy Committee Secretary for the central committee of Shaoguan city until November 1972. From then until June 1977, he served as the deputy Party secretary of the third People's Congress of Guangzhou. From 1977 to 1981, Liang was a member of the Guangdong provincial People's Congress, and the Second Secretary of Guangzhou city. In 1981, Liang served briefly as the First Secretary of Shenzhen. He then became a citizen of the city, and a member and secretary of the standing committee to create its Special Economic Zone. Once the government was founded, he served as the mayor of Shenzhen. He continued to serve as mayor and Party secretary of the city's central committee until August 1985, when he gave up the position of mayor. He continued to serve as Party secretary of the central committee until 1986. From 1986 to 1987, he served as the deputy director of the Guangdong People's Consultative Committee.

From 1987 to 1988, Liang was the deputy organization minister during the founding of Hainan province. In February 1988, he became the deputy secretary of the central working committee of the new province. From March 1988 to September 1989, he served concurrently as the deputy secretary of the Hainan central committee and as the first governor of the province. In the wake of the 1989 Tiananmen Square protests and massacre, Liang Xiang allowed many of the protest leaders to flee the country through Hainan. As a result, he was purged in September on trumped up charges of corruption and misuse of power. In that same year, Liang lost his status as a representative at the 7th National People's Congress. On 13 December 1998, Liang Xiang died due to illness in Guangzhou.

Political offices
Preceded by —	Governor of Hainan; 1988 – 1989	Succeeded by Liu Jianfeng
