= Politics of Jiangxi =

Politics of a province of China

The politics of Jiangxi Province in the People's Republic of China is structured in a dual party-government system like all other governing institutions in mainland China.

The Governor of Jiangxi is the highest-ranking official in the People's Government of Jiangxi. However, in the province's dual party-government governing system, the Governor has less power than the Jiangxi Chinese Communist Party (CCP) Provincial Committee Secretary, colloquially termed the "Jiangxi CCP Party Chief".

== List of Jiangxi CCP Party secretaries ==
Image	Name (English)	Name (Chinese)	Term start	Term end	Ref.
	Chen Zhengren	陈正人	June 1949	November 1952	
	Yang Shangkui	杨尚奎	1952	1966	
	Cheng Shiqing	程世清	1966	1971	
	Jiang Weiqing	江渭清	1971	1982	
	Bai Dongcai	白栋材	1982	1985	
	Wan Shaofen	万绍芬	1985	1988	
	Mao Zhiyong	毛致用	1988	1995	
	Wu Guanzheng	吴官正	April 1995	April 1997	
	Shu Huihuo	舒惠国	April 1997	April 2001	
	Meng Jianzhu	孟建柱	April 2001	November 2007	
	Su Rong	苏荣	November 2007	March 2013	
	Qiang Wei	强卫	March 2013	June 2016	
	Lu Xinshe	鹿心社	June 2016	March 2018	
	Liu Qi	刘奇	March 2018	October 2021	
	Yi Lianhong	易炼红	October 2021	December 2022	
	Yin Hong	尹弘	December 2022	Incumbent	

== List of the governors of Jiangxi ==
The Governor is the second highest-ranking official in Jiangxi after the CCP Party Secretary. The governor is responsible for all provincial matters related to economics, personnel, the environment, politics and foreign policy.

1. Shao Shiping (邵式平): 1949–1965
2. Fang Zhichun (方志纯): 1965–1967
3. Cheng Shiqing (程世清): 1968–1972
4. She Jide (佘积德): 1972–1974
5. Jiang Weiqing (江渭清): 1974–1979
6. Bai Dongcai (白栋材): 1979–1982
7. Zhao Zengyi (赵增益): 1982–1985
8. Ni Xiance (倪献策): 1985–1986
9. Wu Guanzheng (吴官正): 1986–1995
10. Shu Shengyou (舒圣佑): 1995–2001
11. Huang Zhiquan (黄智权): 2001–2007
12. Wu Xinxiong (吴新雄): January 2007 – June 2011
13. Lu Xinshe: June 2011 – July 2016
14. Liu Qi (刘奇): July 2016 – August 2018
15. Yi Lianhong (易炼红): August 2018 – October 2021
16. Ye Jianchun(叶建春): October 2021 – present

== List of chairmen of Jiangxi People's Congress ==
1. Yang Shangkui (杨尚奎): 1979–1983
2. Ma Jikong (马继孔): 1983–1985
3. Wang Shufeng (王书枫): 1985–1988
4. Xu Qin (许勤): 1988–1993
5. Mao Zhiyong (毛致用): 1993–1998
6. Shu Huiguo (舒惠国): 1998–2001
7. Meng Jianzhu: 2001–2008
8. Su Rong: 2008–2013
9. Qiang Wei: 2013–2016
10. Lu Xinshe: 2016–2018
11. Liu Qi: 2018 – 2022
12. Yi Lianhong: 2022–2023
13. Yin Hong: 2023–present

== List of chairmen of CPPCC Jiangxi Committee ==
1. Yang Shangkui (杨尚奎): 1955–1967, 1978–1979
2. Fang Zhichun (方志纯): 1979–1983
3. Wu Ping (吴平): 1983–1993
4. Liu Fangren (刘方仁): 1993–1994
5. Zhu Zhihong (朱治宏): 1994–2003
6. Zhong Qihuang (钟起煌): 2003–2007
7. Fu Kecheng (傅克诚): 2007–2012
8. Zhang Yijiong: 2012
9. Huang Yuejin (黄跃金): 2012–2018
10. Yao Zengke (姚增科): 2018–2023
11. Tang Yijun (唐一军): 2023–2024
12. Song Fulong (宋福龙): 2025–present
