= Jiangxi Military District =

- 中国人民解放军江西省军区
- Founded: 1949; 77 years ago
- Country: China
- Allegiance: Chinese Communist Party
- Type: Military district
- Role: Command and control
- Part of: People's Liberation Army
- Headquarters: Nanchang, Jiangxi

Commanders
- Commander: Major general (shaojiang) Huang Wenhui
- Political Commisar: Major general (shaojiang) Bao Zemin

Chinese name
- Simplified Chinese: 中国人民解放军江西省军区
- Traditional Chinese: 中國人民解放軍雲南省軍區
Transcriptions
Standard Mandarin
- Hanyu Pinyin: Zhōngguó Rénmín Jiěfàngjūn Jiāngxīshěng Jūnqū

The Jiangxi Military District (Chinese: 中国人民解放军江西省军区; full name People's Liberation Army Jiangxi Military District or PLA Jiangxi Military District) is a military district of the National Defense Mobilization Department of the Central Military Commission in China.

== History ==
Jiangxi Military District was established in 1949.

== Leaders ==
=== Commanders ===
Name (English)	Name (Chinese)	Tenure begins	Tenure ends	Note
Chen Qihan	陈奇涵	June 1949	February 1954	
Xiao Yuanli	肖元礼	February 1954	March 1955	
Deng Keming	邓克明	March 1955	December 1963	
Wu Ruishan	吴瑞山	March 1964	July 1967	
Yang Dongliang	杨栋梁	August 1967	June 1972	
Chen Changfeng	陈昌奉	November 1972	August 1975	
Xin Junjie	信俊杰	September 1975	May 1983	
Wang Baotian	王保田	May 1983	August 1988	
Zhang Chuanshi	张传诗	April 1989	June 1993	
Feng Jinmao	冯金茂	June 1993	June 2002	
Hao Jingmin	郝敬民	June 2002	November 2006	
Wang Ning	王宁	November 2006	November 2007	
Peng Shuigen	彭水根	November 2007	April 2010	
Zheng Shuicheng	郑水成	April 2010	July 2013	
Xiong Andong	熊安东	July 2013	March 2014	
Zhang Xiaoming	张晓明	March 2014	August 2016	
Wu Yafei	吴亚非	August 2017	April 2022	
Zhang Gong	张弓 (将领)	April 2022	July 2023	
Huang Wenhui	黄文辉	July 2023		

=== Political commissars ===
Name (English)	Name (Chinese)	Tenure begins	Tenure ends	Note
Chen Zhengren	陈正人	June 1949	January 1953	
Xiao Yuanli	肖元礼	February 1952	January 1953	Second Political Commissar
Yang Shangkui	杨尚奎	January 1953	January 1965	
Xiao Yuanli	肖元礼	January 1953	June 1954	
Tang Guanghui	汤光恢	August 1961	April 1964	Second Political Commissar
Fang Zhichun	方志纯	January 1965	July 1967	First Political Commissar
Lin Zhongzhao	林忠照	June 1965	August 1967	
Cheng Shiqing	程世清	July 1967	June 1972	First Political Commissar
Zheng Guo	郑国	November 1969	December 1973	Second Political Commissar
Zhang Zhiyong	张志勇	November 1972	March 1979	
Jiang Weiqing	江渭清	December 1974	October 1982	First Political Commissar
Zhang Lixong	张力雄	June 1975	December 1980	
Zhang Chuangchu	张闯初	July 1979	September 1982	
Song Changgeng	宋长庚	October 1981	May 1983	
Bai Dongcai	白栋材	October 1982	August 1985	First Political Commissar
Wang Guande	王冠德	May 1983	April 1989	
Wei Chang'an	魏长安	April 1989	June 1990	
Zhang Yujiang	张玉江	June 1990	February 1992	
Zheng Shichao	郑仕超	May 1992	June 1999	
Chen Lijiu	陈礼久	June 1999	June 2004	
Wei Liang	魏亮	June 2004	October 2004	
Li Guangjin	李光金	October 2004	September 2005	
Wang Qingbao	王清葆	September 2005	October 2009	
Zhu Zhengping	朱争平	October 2009	July 2010	
Tao Zhengming	陶正明	July 2010	November 2013	
Ma Jiali	马家利	November 2013	March 2015	
Yang Xiaoxiang	杨笑祥	March 2015	October 2018	
Bao Zemin	鲍泽敏	November 2021		
