= Shanghai Municipal Committee of the Chinese People's Political Consultative Conference =

Shanghai Municipal Committee of the Chinese People's Political Consultative Conference 中国人民政治协商会议上海市委员会
- 14th
- Emblem of the Chinese People's Political Consultative Conference

Type
- Type: United front organ Constitutional convention (Historical); Legislature (Historical) of Chinese People's Political Consultative Conference

History
- Founded: May 12, 1955; 70 years ago
- Preceded by: Shanghai Municipal People's Congress Consultative Committee

Leadership
- Chairperson: Hu Wenrong

Website
- www.shszx.gov.cn

Chinese name
- Simplified Chinese: 中国人民政治协商会议上海市委员会
- Traditional Chinese: 中國人民政治協商會議上海市委員會
Transcriptions
Standard Mandarin
- Hanyu Pinyin: Zhōngguó Rénmín Zhèngzhì Xiéshāng Huìyì Shànghǎishì Wěiyuánhuì

Abbreviation
- Simplified Chinese: 上海市政协
- Traditional Chinese: 上海市政協
- Literal meaning: CPPCC Shanghai Municipal Committee
Transcriptions
Standard Mandarin
- Hanyu Pinyin: Shànghǎishì Zhèngxié

The Shanghai Municipal Committee of the Chinese People's Political Consultative Conference (Chinese: 中国人民政治协商会议上海市委员会) is the advisory body and a local organization of the Chinese People's Political Consultative Conference in Shanghai, China. It is supervised and directed by the Shanghai Municipal Committee of the Chinese Communist Party.

== History ==
The Shanghai Municipal Committee of the Chinese People's Political Consultative Conference traces its origins to the Shanghai Municipal People's Congress Consultative Committee (上海市各界人民代表会议协商委员会), founded in 1949.

=== Anti-corruption campaign ===
On 12 July 2023, Dong Yunhu was put under investigation for alleged "serious violations of discipline and laws" by the Central Commission for Discipline Inspection (CCDI), the party's internal disciplinary body, and the National Supervisory Commission, the highest anti-corruption agency of China. On 28 August 2024, he was sentenced to life imprisonment for taking bribes worth 148 million yuan.

== Term ==
=== 1st ===
- Term of Office: May 1955– October 1958
- Chairperson: Ke Qingshi
- Vice Chairpersons: Liu Jiping, Sheng Pihua, Hu Juwen, Jin Zhonghua, Liu Shuzhou, Shen Zhiyuan, Li Zhaohuan
- Secretary-General: Liu Shuzhou

=== 2nd ===
- Term of Office: November 1958– July 1962
- Chairperson: Chen Pixian
- Vice Chairpersons: Liu Jiping, Liu Shuzhou, Liu Jingji, Shen Tilan, Jin Zhonghua, Chen Wangdao, Hu Juwen, Shu Xincheng, Li Zhaohuan, Wei Wenbo
- Secretary-General: Wang Zhizhong

=== 3rd ===
- Term of Office: July 1962– September 1964
- Chairperson: Chen Pixian
- Vice Chairpersons: Liu Shuzhou, Liu Jingji, Chen Tongsheng, Chen Wangdao, Shen Tilan, Jin Zhonghua, Zhou Gucheng, Meng Xiancheng, Li Zhaohuan
- Secretary-General: Wang Zhizhong

=== 4th ===
- Term of Office: September 1964– December 1977
- Chairperson: Chen Pixian
- Vice Chairpersons: Shi Ximin, Jin Zhonghua, Chen Wangdao, Chen Tongsheng, Shen Tilan, Liu Jingji, Li Zhaohuan, Meng Xiancheng, Zhou Gucheng, Wang Zhizhong, Wu Ruoan, Lu Yudao
- Secretary-General: Wu Ruoyan

=== 5th ===
- Term of Office: December 1977– April 1983
- Chairperson: Peng Chong → Wang Yiping (December 1979–)
- Vice Chairpersons: Zhao Xingzhi, Zhang Chengzong, Liang Guobin, Su Buqing, Ba Jin, Li Gancheng, Zhao Zukang, Huang Chibo, Feng Depei, Liu Jingji, Wu Ruoan, Wang Zhizhong, Zhou Gucheng, Lu Yudao, Song Richang, Jing Renqiu, Long Yue, Yang Xuanwu, Tan Jiazhen, Liu Liangmo, Xu Wensi, Tang Junyuan
- Secretary-General: Wu Ruoyan

=== 6th ===
- Term of Office: April 1983– April 1988
- Chairperson: Li Guohao
- Vice Chairpersons: Zhang Chengzong, Song Richang, Mei Jiasheng, Yang Shifa, Jing Renqiu, Lu Yudao, Zhao Chaogou, Xu Yifang, Long Yue, Ye Shuhua, Liu Liangmo, Tang Junyuan, Dong Yinchu, Wu Wenqi, Mao Jingquan, Yang Kai, Zhou Bi, Zhang Ruifang, Yang You, Yan Dongsheng
- Secretary-General: Fan Zhengfu

=== 7th ===
- Term of Office: April 1988– February 1993
- Chairperson: Xie Xide
- Vice Chairpersons: Mao Jingquan, Wang Xing, Zhao Chaogou, Xu Yifang, Tang Junyuan, Dong Yinchu, Zhang Ruifang, Yang You, Yan Dongsheng, Wu Zengliang, Chen Mingshan, Zheng Lizhi, Zhao Xianchu, Chen Haozhu
- Secretary-General: Chen Fugen

=== 8th ===
- Term of Office: February 1993– February 1998
- Chairperson: Chen Tiedi
- Vice Chairpersons: Mao Jingquan, Shi Zhusan, Liu Jingji, Xu Yifang, Yang You, Zheng Lizhi, Chen Haozhu, Zhao Dingyu, Liu Hengchuan, Guo Xiuzhen, Wang Shenghong, Xie Lijuan, Chen Zhengxing, Li Wuwei
- Secretary-General: Ma Songshan, Wu Hanmin

=== 9th ===
- Term of Office: February 1998– February 2003
- Chairperson: Wang Liping
- Vice Chairpersons: Zhu Daren, Huang Yuejin, Song Yiqiao, Wang Shenghong, Xie Lijuan, Zheng Lizhi, Chen Haozhu, Liu Hengchuan, Zuo Huanchen, Chen Zhengxing, Yu Yunbo, Huang Guancong, Shi Sizhen
- Secretary-General: Wu Hanmin

=== 10th ===
- Term of Office: February 2003– January 2008
- Chairperson: Jiang Yiren
- Vice Chairpersons: Song Yiqiao, Huang Yuejin, Wang Shenghong, Xie Lijuan, Zuo Huanchen, Yu Yunbo, Huang Guancong, Shi Sizhen, Wang Ronghua, Wang Xinkui, Shen Hongguang
- Secretary-General: Wu Hanmin → Yang Qiqing

=== 11th ===
- Term of Office: January 2008– January 2013
- Chairperson: Feng Guoqin
- Vice Chairpersons: Zhu Xiaoming, Wu Zhiming, Zhou Taitong, Wang Xinkui, Li Liangyuan, Qian Jinglin, Wu Youying, Zhou Hanmin, Cai Wei, Gao Xiaomei, Jiang Liang
- Secretary-General: Chen Haigang

=== 12th ===
- Term of Office: January 2013– January 2018
- Chairperson: Wu Zhiming
- Vice Chairpersons: Zhou Taitong (–January 2016), Li Liangyuan (–January 2016), Zhou Hanmin, Cai Wei, Gao Xiaomei, Jiang Liang (–January 2017), Fang Huiping, Wang Zhixiong, Zhang Endi, Li Yiping (January 2016–), Xu Yibo (January 2016–), Jiang Ping (January 2017–), Zhao Wen (January 2017–)
- Secretary-General: Bei Xiaoxi

=== 13th ===
- Term of Office: January 2018– January 2023
- Chairperson: Dong Yunhu
- Vice Chairpersons: Fang Huiping (–January 2021), Zhao Wen (–January 2020), Zhou Hanmin, Wang Zhixiong (–January 2021), Zhang Endi, Li Yiping, Xu Yibo (–January 2021), Jin Xingming, Huang Zhen, Yu Lijuan (January 2021–), Wu Xinbao (January 2021–), Shou Ziqi (January 2021–), Qian Feng (January 2021–)
- Secretary-General: Bei Xiaoxi (–January 2022) → Huang Guoping (January 2022–)

=== 14th ===
- Term of Office: January 2023– 2028
- Chairperson: Hu Wenrong
- Vice Chairpersons: Zhang Endi (–January 2024), Chen Qun, Xiao Guiyu, Jin Xingming, Huang Zhen, Yu Lijuan, Wu Xinbao, Shou Ziqi, Qian Feng, Shao Zhiqing (January 2024–)
- Secretary-General: Huang Guoping (–September 2024) → Zhou Ya (January 2025–)
