= Jiangxi Provincial People's Government =

Government of Jiangxi

Jiangxi Provincial People's Government 江西省人民政府
- Established: June 16, 1949; 77 years ago

Leadership
- Governor: Chen Yongqi (Acting); 11 November 2026
- Parent body: Central People's Government; Jiangxi Provincial People's Congress
- Elected by: Jiangxi Provincial People's Congress

Website
- www.jiangxi.gov.cn

The Jiangxi Provincial People's Government is the local administrative agency of Jiangxi. It is officially elected by the Jiangxi Provincial People's Congress and is formally responsible to the Jiangxi Provincial People's Congress and its Standing Committee. Under the country's one-party system, the governor is subordinate to the secretary of the Jiangxi Provincial Committee of the Chinese Communist Party. The Provincial government is headed by a governor, currently is Chen Yongqi since 11 November 2026.

== History ==
On June 16, 1949, the Jiangxi Provincial People's Government was established. In February 1955, it was reorganized into the Jiangxi Provincial People's Committee. In January 1968, it was reorganized into the Jiangxi Provincial Revolutionary Committee. In December 1979, it was renamed the Jiangxi Provincial People's Government.

In October 2015, the Jiangxi Provincial Administrative Center was established in Jiulong Lake, with the address at 999 Wolong Road, Hongjiaozhou, Honggutan New District, Nanchang City. In November, the Jiangxi Provincial People's Government agencies began to relocate one after another. After the Spring Festival in February 2016, the old site of the Jiangxi Provincial People's Government at 69 Beijing West Road, Donghu District, Nanchang City was officially closed.

== Organization ==
The organization of the Jiangxi Provincial People's Government includes:

- General Office of the Jiangxi Provincial People's Government

=== Component Departments ===
- Jiangxi Provincial Development and Reform Commission
- Jiangxi Provincial Department of Education
- Jiangxi Provincial Department of Science and Technology
- Jiangxi Provincial Department of Industry and Information Technology
- Jiangxi Provincial Public Security Department
- Jiangxi Provincial Department of Civil Affairs
- Jiangxi Provincial Department of Justice
- Jiangxi Provincial Department of Finance
- Jiangxi Provincial Department of Human Resources and Social Security
- Jiangxi Provincial Department of Natural Resources
- Jiangxi Provincial Department of Ecology and Environment
- Jiangxi Provincial Department of Housing and Urban-Rural Development
- Jiangxi Provincial Department of Transportation
- Jiangxi Provincial Water Resources Department
- Jiangxi Provincial Department of Agriculture and Rural Affairs
- Jiangxi Provincial Department of Commerce
- Jiangxi Provincial Department of Culture and Tourism
- Jiangxi Provincial Health Commission
- Jiangxi Provincial Department of Veterans Affairs
- Jiangxi Provincial Emergency Management Department
- Jiangxi Provincial Audit Office
- Foreign Affairs Office of Jiangxi Provincial People's Government

=== Directly affiliated special institution ===
- State-owned Assets Supervision and Administration Commission of Jiangxi Provincial People's Government

=== Organizations under the government ===
- Jiangxi Forestry Bureau
- Jiangxi Provincial Market Supervision Administration
- Jiangxi Provincial Radio and Television Bureau
- Jiangxi Provincial Ethnic and Religious Affairs Bureau
- Jiangxi Provincial Sports Bureau
- Jiangxi Provincial Bureau of Statistics
- Jiangxi Provincial Civil Air Defense Office
- Jiangxi Provincial Rural Revitalization Bureau
- Jiangxi Provincial Medical Insurance Bureau
- Jiangxi Provincial People's Government Research Office
- Jiangxi Provincial Government Affairs Bureau

=== Departmental management organization ===
- The Jiangxi Provincial Government Service Management Office is managed by the General Office of the Provincial Government.
- The Jiangxi Provincial Bureau of Grain and Material Reserves is managed by the Provincial Development and Reform Commission.
- The Jiangxi Provincial Energy Bureau is managed by the Provincial Development and Reform Commission.
- The Jiangxi Provincial Prison Administration Bureau is managed by the Provincial Department of Justice.
- The Jiangxi Provincial Drug Rehabilitation Administration is managed by the Provincial Department of Justice.
- The Jiangxi Provincial Administration of Traditional Chinese Medicine is managed by the Provincial Health Commission.
- The Jiangxi Provincial Drug Administration is managed by the Provincial Market Supervision Administration.
- The Jiangxi Provincial Geological Bureau is managed by the Provincial Department of Natural Resources.

=== Directly affiliated institutions ===
- Jiangxi Province Machinery Industry Management Office
- Jiangxi Light Industry Management Office
- Jiangxi Provincial Coal Industry Management Office
- Jiangxi Provincial Local Chronicles Compilation Committee Office
- Jiangxi Provincial Intellectual Property Office
- Jiangxi Institute of Economic Management
- Jiangxi Academy of Sciences
- Jiangxi Academy of Social Sciences
- Jiangxi Academy of Agricultural Sciences
- Jiangxi Academy of Forestry Sciences
- Nanchang Nonferrous Metallurgy Design and Research Institute
- Jiangxi Provincial Supply and Marketing Cooperative
- Jiangxi Provincial Urban Development Service Center
- Jiangxi Provincial Institute of Geological Survey and Exploration

=== Dispatched agency ===
- Jiangxi Ganjiang New District Management Committee
- Ganzhou Economic and Technological Development Zone Management Committee
- Yichun Economic and Technological Development Zone Management Committee
- Jiangxi Provincial People's Government Office in Beijing

== See also ==
- Politics of Jiangxi
  - Jiangxi Provincial People's Congress
  - Jiangxi Provincial People's Government
    - Governor of Jiangxi
  - Jiangxi Provincial Committee of the Chinese Communist Party
    - Party Secretary of Jiangxi
  - Jiangxi Provincial Committee of the Chinese People's Political Consultative Conference
