= Hu Youtao =

Chinese politician (born 1955)

- 胡幼桃

Vice Chairman of the Jiangxi Provincial Committee of the Chinese People's Political Consultative Conference
- In office January 2015 – January 2018
- Chairman: Huang Yuejin

Vice Governor of Jiangxi
- In office February 2012 – July 2017
- Governor: Lu Xinshe; Liu Qi

Personal details
- Born: April 1955 (age 71) Pingxiang County, Jiangxi, China
- Party: Chinese Communist Party (1986-2025, expelled)
- Education: Jiangxi University of Finance and Economics

Hu Youtao (Chinese: 胡幼桃; pinyin: Hú Yòutáo; born April 1955) is a former Chinese politician who spent his entire career in his home-province Jiangxi. He was investigated by China's top anti-graft agency in June 2025. He has been retired for 7 years. Previously he served as vice chairman of the Jiangxi Provincial Committee of the Chinese People's Political Consultative Conference.

== Early life and education ==
Hu was born in Pingxiang County, Jiangxi, in April 1955, and graduated from Jiangxi University of Finance and Economics.

== Career ==
Hu entered the workforce in February 1971, and joined the Chinese Communist Party (CCP) in June 1986. Starting in August 1983, he served in several posts in Jiangxi Provincial Planning Commission (now Jiangxi Provincial Development and Reform Commission), including staff member, principal staff member, deputy director, and director. He was eventually promoted to deputy head in April 2002. He was head of the Jiangxi Provincial Finance Department in February 2003, in addition to serving as party branch secretary of the Jiangxi Provincial Local Taxation Bureau and director of the Office of the Leading Group for Jiangxi Provincial Rural Tax and Fee Reform (Rural Comprehensive Reform). He rose to become assistant governor of Jiangxi in April 2008 and subsequently vice chairman of the Jiangxi Provincial Committee of the Chinese People's Political Consultative Conference in January 2010. He took up the post of vice governor of Jiangxi which he held only from February 2012 to July 2015, although he remained vice chairman of the Jiangxi Provincial Committee of the Chinese People's Political Consultative Conference until January 2018.

== Investigation ==
On 19 June 2025, Hu was placed under investigation for "serious violations of laws and regulations" by the Central Commission for Discipline Inspection (CCDI), the party's internal disciplinary body, and the National Supervisory Commission, the highest anti-corruption agency of China. In December 2025, he was expelled from the CCP.

On 12 October 2026, Hu was sentenced to 13 years and fined 3 million yuan at Wenzhou Intermediate People's Court, for taking bribes in 43.64 million yuan.

Government offices
Preceded by Yong Zhongcheng	Head of the Jiangxi Provincial Finance Department; 2003–2010	Succeeded by Hu Qiang
