= Jiangxi Provincial Committee of the Chinese People's Political Consultative Conference =

Jiangxi Provincial Committee of the Chinese People's Political Consultative Conference 中国人民政治协商会议江西省委员会
- 13th
- Emblem of the Chinese People's Political Consultative Conference

Type
- Type: United front organ Constitutional convention (Historical); Legislature (Historical) of Chinese People's Political Consultative Conference

History
- Founded: January 1955; 71 years ago
- Preceded by: Jiangxi Provincial People's Congress Consultative Committee

Leadership
- Chairperson: Song Fulong

Website
- jxzx.jxnews.com.cn

Chinese name
- Simplified Chinese: 中国人民政治协商会议江西省委员会
- Traditional Chinese: 中國人民政治協商會議江西省委員會
Transcriptions
Standard Mandarin
- Hanyu Pinyin: Zhōngguó Rénmín Zhèngzhì Xiéshāng Huìyì Jiāngxīshěng Wěiyuánhuì

Abbreviation
- Simplified Chinese: 江西省政协
- Traditional Chinese: 江西省政協
- Literal meaning: CPPCC Jiangxi Provincial Committee
Transcriptions
Standard Mandarin
- Hanyu Pinyin: Jiāngxīshěng Zhèngxié

The Jiangxi Provincial Committee of the Chinese People's Political Consultative Conference (Chinese: 中国人民政治协商会议江西省委员会; abbreviation CPPCC Jiangxi Provincial Committee) is the provincial advisory body and a local organization of the Chinese People's Political Consultative Conference in Jiangxi, China. It is supervised and directed by the Jiangxi Provincial Committee of the Chinese Communist Party.

== History ==
The Jiangxi Provincial Committee of the Chinese People's Political Consultative Conference traces its origins to the Jiangxi Provincial People's Congress Consultative Committee (江西省各界人民代表会议协商委员会), founded in August 1950.

=== Anti-corruption campaign ===
On 2 April 2024, Tang Yijun was suspected of "serious violations of laws and regulations" by the Central Commission for Discipline Inspection (CCDI), the party's internal disciplinary body, and the National Supervisory Commission, the highest anti-corruption agency of China.

== Term ==
=== 1st ===
- Term: January 1955–July 1959
- Chairperson: Yang Shangkui
- Vice Chairpersons: Mo Xun, Huang Zhizhen, Liu Yifeng, Liu Zhigang, Xu Deyuan, Fu Xiaoxian, Yu Hongshen (May 1957–December 1959), Guo Guangzhou (May 1957–December 1959), Pan Shiyan (May 1957–December 1959), Wang Deyu (May 1957–December 1959)
- Secretary-General: Yu Hongshen (January 1955–May 1957) → Li Yiping

=== 2nd ===
- Term: July 1959–October 1964
- Chairperson: Yang Shangkui
- Vice Chairpersons: Guo Guangzhou, Luo Mengwen, Huang Lin, Mo Xun, Huang Zhizhen, Pan Zhenya, Yu Hongshen, Liu Zhigang, Gu Jiguang, Fu Xiaoxian, Pan Shiyan, Wang Deyu
- Secretary-General: Li Yiping

=== 3rd ===
- Term: October 1964–1966
- Chairperson: Yang Shangkui
- Vice Chairpersons: Guo Guangzhou, Huang Zhizhen, Luo Mengwen, Huang Lin, Mo Xun, Pan Zhenya, Yu Hongshen, Liu Zhigang, Gu Jiguang, Pan Shiyan, Wang Deyu, Ping Rong
- Secretary-General: Li Yiping

=== 4th ===
- Term: February 1978–April 1983
- Chairperson: Yang Shangkui (February 1978–December 1979) → Fang Zhichun (December 1979–April 1983)
- Vice Chairpersons: Luo Mengwen, Gan Zuchang, Liang Dashan, Pan Zhenya, Li Shizhang, Hu Delan, Liu Huping, Zhong Ping, Lai Shaorao, Gu Jiguang, Pan Shiyan, He Shikun, Lu Xiaopeng, Shen Hanqing, Ma Jikong (December 1979–April 1983), Zhu Kaiquan (December 1979–April 1983), Wu Zhenfeng (December 1979–April 1983), Li Huafeng (December 1979–April 1983), Ni Nanshan (December 1979–April 1983), Liu Jianhua (December 1979–April 1983)
- Secretary-General: Liu Kun (February 1978–December 1979), He Heng (December 1979–April 1983)

=== 5th ===
- Term: May 1983–January 1988
- Chairperson: Wu Ping
- Vice Chairpersons: Li Huafeng, Li Shizhang, Gu Jiguang, He Shikun, Lu Xiaopeng, Shen Hanqing, Liu Jianhua, Lu Liang, Zhu Danhua, Guo Qingfan, Li Shanyuan, Wu Yongle, Yang Yongfeng (May 1984–), Wu Tiyu (May 1984–), Jin Liqiang (May 1984–), Wu Yunzhong (July 1985–)
- Secretary-General: Liu Yurui

=== 6th ===
- Term: January 1988–January 1993
- Chairperson: Wu Ping
- Vice Chairpersons: Yang Yongfeng, Lu Xiaopeng, Shen Hanqing, Li Shanyuan, Wu Yongle, Jin Liqiang, Liao Yanxiong, Li Peirao, Dai Zhizhong, Ye Xueling (April 1990–), Huang Liqi (April 1990–), Luo Ming (April 1990–)
- Secretary-General: Sun Dianjia

=== 7th ===
- Term: February 1993–January 1998
- Chairperson: Liu Fangren → Zhu Zhihong (February 1994–)
- Vice Chairpersons: Ye Xueling, Wu Yongle, Liao Yanxiong, Dai Zhizhong, Huang Liqi, Luo Ming, Mei Yilong (February 1994–), Jiang Guozhen (February 1994–), Li Zhicheng (February 1994–)

=== 8th ===
- Term: January 1998–January 2003
- Chairperson: Zhu Zhihong
- Vice Chairpersons: Mei Yilong, Luo Ming, Jiang Guozhen, Li Zhicheng, Han Jingcheng, Huang Dingyuan, Yu Changlin, Liu Yunlai, Wo Zuquan, Zhang Huakang, Huang Maoheng (February 1999–)

=== 9th ===
- Term: January 2003–January 2008
- Chairperson: Zhong Qihuang
- Vice Chairpersons: Han Jingcheng, Wang Linsen, Huang Maoheng, Huang Dingyuan, Liu Yunlai, Zhang Huakang, Jin Yi, Yin Guoguang, Yong Zhongcheng, Ni Guoxi, Yi Cheng
- Secretary-General:

=== 10th ===
- Term: January 2008–January 2013
- Chairperson: Fu Keqiang (January 2008–February 2012) → Zhang Yijiong (February 2012–June 2012) → Huang Yuejin
- Vice Chairpersons: Wang Linsen, Zhu Zhangcai, Chen Qinghua, Li Huadong, Song Chenguang, Chen Anzhong, Tang Jianren, Liu Xiaozhuang, Zheng Xiaoyan
- Secretary-General:

=== 11th ===
- Term: January 2013–January 2018
- Chairperson: Huang Yuejin
- Vice Chairpersons: Li Huadong, Tang Jianren, Liu Xiaozhuang, Zheng Xiaoyan, Zhong Ligui, Xiao Guangming (January 2013–January 2016), Liu Lizu, Xu Aimin, Sun Jusheng
- Secretary-General: Xiao Weiqun

=== 12th ===
- Term: January 2018–January 2023
- Chairperson: Yao Zengke
- Vice Chairpersons: Li Huadong, Xie Ru, Tang Jianren, Liu Xiaozhuang, Chen Junqing, Zhang Yong, Xiao Yi (January 2018–August 2021), Liu Weiping, Lei Yuanjiang, Yin Jianye (January 2022–), Chen Xingchao (January 2022–), Hu Qiang (January 2022–)
- Secretary-General: Wang Shuang

=== 13th ===
- Term: January 2023–2028
- Chairperson: Tang Yijun (–May 29, 2024) → Song Fulong (January 2025–)
- Vice Chairpersons: Chen Junqing, Xie Ru, Yin Jianye, Sun Jusheng (–March 2023), Chen Xingchao (–September 2025), Lu Tianxi, Yu Xiuming, Gu Qing
- Secretary-General: Peng Shidong
