= Yin Jianye =

Chinese politician (born 1963)

- 尹建业

Deputy Chairperson of the Jiangxi Provincial Committee of the Chinese People's Political Consultative Conference
- In office January 2022 – December 2025

Secretary of the Political and Legal Affairs Commission of the CCP Jiangxi Provincial Committee
- In office November 2016 – December 2021
- Preceded by: Zhou Meng
- Succeeded by: Zhang Hongxing

Vice Governor of the Jiangxi Provincial People's Government
- In office October 2015 – March 2017

Vice Governor of the Yunnan Provincial People's Government
- In office January 2013 – October 2015

Personal details
- Born: December 1963 (age 62) Dali City, Yunnan, China
- Party: Chinese Communist Party (1985-2026, expelled)
- Education: Yunnan Agricultural University; Kunming University of Science and Technology

Yin Jianye (Chinese: 尹建业; born December 1963) is a former Chinese politician of Bai ethnic heritage, who served as the deputy chairperson of the Jiangxi Provincial Committee of the Chinese People's Political Consultative Conference from 2022 to 2025.

== Career ==
Yin was born in Dali City, Yunnan in December 1963. He enrolled to Yunnan Agricultural University in 1982, which majored in fruit tree. After gradruating in 1986, he was appointed as the member of the Yunnan Provincial Lecturers' Group. In 1987, he was appointed as the staff member and deputy director of the Research Office, Institute of Information of the Yunnan Academy of Agricultural Sciences. In 1992, he was appointed as the deputy director of development division and finance division.

In 1993, Yin was transferred to Yunnan Provincial Committee of the Chinese Communist Youth League and appointed as the director of the office in 1995. In 1997, he was appointed as the head of the United Front Work Department and the secretary-general of the Yunnan Provincial Youth Federation.

In 1999, Yin was transferred to Yunnan Provincial Supply and Marketing Cooperative and appointed as the assistant director. He was appointed as the secretary-general and the deputy director in 2001.

In 2002, Yin was served as the deputy secretary-general of the Yunnan Provincial People's Government. He was appointed as the director of the Yunnan Provincial Audit Office.

In 2011, Yin was served as the party secretary of Dali Bai Autonomous Prefecture.

In January 2013, Yin was appointed as the vice governor of the Yunnan Provincial People's Government. In October 2015, he was moved to Jiangxi, and appointed as the vice governor of the Jiangxi Provincial People's Government.

In November 2016, Yin was appointed as the standing member and the secretary of the political and legal affairs commission of the CCP Jiangxi Provincial Committee. In January 2022, he was appointed as the deputy chairperson of the Jiangxi Provincial Committee of the Chinese People's Political Consultative Conference.

== Investigation ==
On 21 December 2025, Yin was put under investigation for alleged "serious violations of discipline and laws" by the Central Commission for Discipline Inspection (CCDI), the party's internal disciplinary body, and the National Supervisory Commission, the highest anti-corruption agency of China. Yin was expelled from the party and dismissed from the public office on 22 June 2026.

Party political offices
Preceded by Zhou Meng	Secretary of the Political and Legal Affairs Commission of the CCP Jiangxi Provincial Committee; 2016–2021	Succeeded by Zhang Hongxing
