= Xu Qin (politician, born 1928) =

Chinese politician (1928–2021)

- 许勤

Chairman of Jiangxi People's Congress
- In office 3 February 1988 – 4 February 1993
- Preceded by: Wang Shufeng
- Succeeded by: Mao Zhiyong

Personal details
- Born: January 1928 Suizhong County, Fengtian, Republic of China
- Died: 18 October 2021 (aged 93) Nanchang, Jiangxi, People's Republic of China
- Party: Chinese Communist Party
- Education: Party School of the CCP Jiangxi Provincial Committee

Chinese name
- Simplified Chinese: 许勤
- Traditional Chinese: 許勤
Transcriptions
Standard Mandarin
- Hanyu Pinyin: Xǔ Qín

Xu Qin (January 1928 – 18 October 2021) was a Chinese politician who served as party secretary of Jiangxi from 1982 to 1985 and chairman of Jiangxi People's Congress from 1988 to 1993.

He was a delegate to the 5th, 6th, 7th and 8th National People's Congress. He was a member of the standing Committee of the 8th National People's Congress. He was a representative of the 14th National Congress of the Chinese Communist Party. He was an alternate member of the 12th Central Committee of the Chinese Communist Party.

== Biography ==
Xu was born in Suizhong County, Fengtian, in January 1928, during the Republic of China. He joined the Chinese Communist Party in September 1949.

Xu got involved in politics in 1949, when he became a secretary in the Office of CCP Fuzhou Prefectural Party Committee. He then continued working in Linchuan County, holding positions as head of Publicity Department, head of Agriculture and Industry, deputy party secretary of the county, and party secretary of the county. In 1960, he was elevated to first secretary of Nancheng County, and held that office until 1967. He was eventually purged during the Cultural Revolution but later reinstated in 1971. After a year of studying at the Party School of the CCP Jiangxi Provincial Committee, he was admitted to member of the standing committee of the CCP Fuzhou Prefectural Party Committee, the prefecture's top authority. In 1975, he was made head of China's agricultural technology support team for Senegal, but having held the position for only two years. In October 1977, he rose to become party secretary of Fuzhou and in April 1979 was appointed deputy secretary-general of the CCP Jiangxi Provincial Committee and director of the Provincial Foreign Affairs Office. In December, he was appointed vice governor and secretary-general of Jiangxi and was admitted to member of the standing committee of the CCP Jiangxi Provincial Committee, the province's top authority. In December 1982, he took office as party secretary of Jiangxi, and served until June 1985. In February 1988, he moved up the ranks to chairman of Jiangxi People's Congress, the highest legislature in the province, serving until February 1993. He resigned in November 2000.

On 18 October 2021, he died from an illness in Nanchang, Jiangxi, aged 93.

== Autobiography ==
- 回顾与探索 [Review and Exploration] (in Chinese). Nanchang, Jiangxi: Jiangxi People's Publishing House. 2003. ISBN 7210027459.

Party political offices
Preceded by Xie Fuming (谢富明)	First Communist Party Secretary of Nancheng County; 1960–1967	Succeeded by Position revoked
Assembly seats
Preceded by Wang Shufeng	Chairman of Jiangxi People's Congress; 1988–1993	Succeeded by Mao Zhiyong
