= Party Secretary of Jiangxi =

Provincial government position in China

Secretary of the Jiangxi Provincial Committee of the Chinese Communist Party
- 中国共产党江西省委员会书记
- Emblem of the Chinese Communist Party

- Flag of the Chinese Communist Party

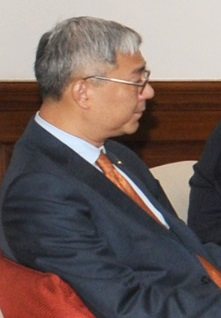
- Incumbent; Yin Hong since 7 December 2022
- Jiangxi Provincial Committee of the Chinese Communist Party
- Type: Party Committee Secretary
- Status: Provincial and ministerial-level official
- Nominator: Central Committee
- Appointer: Jiangxi Provincial Committee; Central Committee
- Inaugural holder: Jiang Zekai
- Formation: 23 July 1927
- Deputy: Deputy Secretary; Secretary-General

The secretary of the Jiangxi Provincial Committee of the Chinese Communist Party is the leader of the Jiangxi Provincial Committee of the Chinese Communist Party (CCP). As the CCP is the sole ruling party of the People's Republic of China (PRC), the secretary is the highest ranking post in Jiangxi.

The secretary is officially appointed by the CCP Central Committee based on the recommendation of the CCP Organization Department, which is then approved by the Politburo and its Standing Committee. The secretary can be also appointed by a plenary meeting of the Jiangxi Provincial Committee, but the candidate must be the same as the one approved by the central government. The secretary leads the Standing Committee of the Jiangxi Provincial Committee, and is usually a member of the CCP Central Committee. The secretary leads the work of the Provincial Committee and its Standing Committee. The secretary outranks the governor, who is generally the deputy secretary of the committee.

The current secretary is Yin Hong, who took office on 7 December 2022.

== List of party secretaries ==
=== Republic of China ===
Image	Name (English)	Name (Chinese)	Term start	Term end	Ref.
	Jiang Zekai	江泽楷	23 July 1927	September 1927	
	Chen Tanqiu	陈潭秋	September 1927	1928	
	Lu Chen	陆沉	1928	September 1928	
	Feng Ren	冯任	September 1928	12 December 1928	
	Zhang Shixi	张世熙	12 December 1928	February 1929	
	Shen Jianhua	沈建华	February 1929	January 1930	
	zhang Guoshu	张国庶	March 1930	5 July 1930	
	Li Wenlin	李文林	October 1930	December 1930	
	Chen Zhengren	陈正人	December 1930	15 January 1931	
	Ren Bishi	任弼时	October 1931	November 1931	
	Lu Yongchi	卢永炽	November 1931	December 1931	
	Li Fuchun	李富春	December 1931	5 September 1934	
100x100x	Zeng Shan	曾山	October 1934	January 1938	
	Huang Dao	黄道	January 1938	March 1939	
	Guo Qian	郭潜	November 1939	February 1941	
	Xie Yucai	谢育才	May 1941	July 1941	
	Yan Fuhua	颜福华	July 1941	September 1941	

=== People's Republic of China ===
Image	Name (English)	Name (Chinese)	Term start	Term end	Ref.
	Chen Zhengren	陈正人	June 1949	November 1952	
	Yang Shangkui	杨尚奎	1952	1966	
	Cheng Shiqing	程世清	1966	1971	
	Jiang Weiqing	江渭清	1971	1982	
	Bai Dongcai	白栋材	1982	1985	
	Wan Shaofen	万绍芬	1985	1988	
	Mao Zhiyong	毛致用	1988	1995	
	Wu Guanzheng	吴官正	April 1995	April 1997	
	Shu Huihuo	舒惠国	April 1997	April 2001	
	Meng Jianzhu	孟建柱	April 2001	November 2007	
	Su Rong	苏荣	November 2007	March 2013	
	Qiang Wei	强卫	March 2013	June 2016	
	Lu Xinshe	鹿心社	June 2016	March 2018	
	Liu Qi	刘奇	March 2018	October 2021	
	Yi Lianhong	易炼红	October 2021	December 2022	
	Yin Hong	尹弘	December 2022	Incumbent	
