= Liu Zhonghou =

Chinese politician

Liu Zhonghou (February 1924 - October 15, 2015, Chinese: 刘仲侯), formerly known as Liu Peizeng (Chinese: 刘培增), born in Shanghai and originally from Wuxi, Jiangsu. He held the position of Vice Minister of Education in China and served as Chinese Communist Party Deputy Committee Secretary of the CCP Jiangxi Provincial Committee.

== Life History ==
In May 1942, Liu Zhonghou became a member of the Chinese Communist Party (CCP) at Shanghai Huxin Middle School. In March 1949, he assumed the role of researcher in the Policy Research Office of the Central China Work Committee, and in May of same year, he became a researcher in the Policy Research Office of the Party Committee of Southern Jiangsu Province. In October 1949, he was designated as the leader of the Rural Work Group of the Party Committee of Southern Jiangsu Province.

In October 1950, he was appointed as an inspector of the Organization Department of the Party Committee for the South Jiangsu District. In January 1951, he assumed the role of secretary of the Disciplinary Inspection Committee of the Party Committee for the South Jiangsu District. In May 1952, he assumed the role of secretary to the director of the People's Supervisory Committee of the South Jiangsu Provincial Administration. In November 1952, he assumed the role of director of the Office of the People's Supervisory Committee of the Jiangsu Provincial Government (Chinese: 江苏省人民政府). In May 1954, he assumed leadership of the housekeeping team in the Office of the Audit and Rehabilitation Committee of the East China Bureau. In October 1954, he assumed the role of deputy director of the Jiangsu Provincial Audit Committee; in September 1956, he was appointed director of the Organization Department of the CCP Jiangsu Provincial Committee; in January 1957, he became the secretary of the CCP Qidong County Committee; in October 1965, he was designated deputy secretary of the CCP Yancheng Committee; from December 1966 to December 1970, he endured the repercussions of the Cultural Revolution.

In January 1971, Liu Zhonghou successively served as deputy director of the Production Command Department of the Yancheng District Revolutionary Committee, deputy director of the District Revolutionary Committee, member of the Standing Committee of the Yancheng District CCP Committee, deputy secretary, secretary of the Yancheng District CCP Committee, and director of the District Revolutionary Committee; from May to October 1977, he served as vice minister of the Ministry of Education; from December 1978 to February 1982, he served as deputy secretary of the CCP Jiangxi Provincial Committee; from June 1985 to November 1992, he served as deputy secretary of the CCP Advisory Committee of Jiangxi Province. He was designated as the deputy director of the CCP Jiangxi Provincial Advisory Committee and the deputy leader of the CCP Jiangxi Provincial Advisory Group. He retired on January 31, 1997.

He died on October 15, 2015, in Nanchang, at the age of 92.
