= Li Jianbo =

Li Jianbo, may refer to:

- Li Jianbo (politician), Chinese politician.
- Li Jianbo (race walker), Chinese race walker.
