= Hu Qiang =

Chinese politician

- 胡强

Vice Chairman of the Jiangxi Provincial Committee of the Chinese People's Political Consultative Conference
- In office March 2022 – January 2023
- Chairman: Yao Zengke

Vice Governor of Jiangxi
- In office January 2018 – March 2022
- Governor: Liu Qi

Personal details
- Born: March 1962 (age 64) Zaoqiang County, Hebei, China
- Party: Chinese Communist Party (1990–2024; expelled)
- Education: Jiangxi University of Finance and Economics

Chinese name
- Simplified Chinese: 胡强
- Traditional Chinese: 胡強
Transcriptions
Standard Mandarin
- Hanyu Pinyin: Hú Qiáng

Hu Qiang (Chinese: 胡强; born March 1962) is a former Chinese politician who spent his entire career in east China's Jiangxi province. As of February 2024 he was under investigation by China's top graft busters. Previously he served as vice chairman of the Jiangxi Provincial Committee of the Chinese People's Political Consultative Conference and before that, governor of Jiangxi.

He was a delegate to the 12th and 13th National People's Congress.

== Early life and education ==
Hu was born in Zaoqiang County, Hebei, in March 1962. After resuming the college entrance examination, in 1981, he enrolled at Jiangxi University of Finance and Economics, where he majored in national economic plan.

== Career ==
After graduating in 1985, Hu was despatched to Jiangxi Provincial Finance Department. He joined the Chinese Communist Party (CCP) in February 1990. He moved up the ranks to become deputy director in December 2003 and director in September 2010. He rose to become vice governor of Jiangxi in January 2018, and served until March 2022, when he was chosen as vice chairman of the Jiangxi Provincial Committee of the Chinese People's Political Consultative Conference, the provincial advisory body.

== Downfall ==
On 21 February 2024, he was put under investigation for alleged "serious violations of discipline and laws" by the Central Commission for Discipline Inspection (CCDI), the party's internal disciplinary body, and the National Supervisory Commission, the highest anti-corruption agency of China. His colleague Yin Meigen, also vice governor of Jiangxi, became the target of an investigation in March 2023. On August 1, he was expelled from the CCP. On August 27, he was detained by the Supreme People's Procuratorate. On December 17, he was indicted on suspicion of accepting bribes.

On 23 September 2025, Hu was sentenced to 13 years in prison and fined 3 million yuan for accepting bribes totaling more than 65.17 million yuan (about 9.2 million U.S. dollars).

Government offices
Preceded by Hu Youtao	Director of Jiangxi Provincial Finance Department; 2010–2022	Succeeded by Zhu Bin
