= Shaofen =

Shaofen can be a transliteration of multiple Chinese-language given names. Notable people with such a name include:

- Ada Choi, or Cai Shaofen (Chinese: 蔡少芬), Hong Kong actress
- Wan Shaofen (Chinese: 万绍芬; 1930–2026), Chinese politician
