= Liu Ming =

Liu Ming, may refer to:

- Liu Ming (prince), a prince of the Han dynasty
- Liu Ming (Ming dynasty), an official in the Ming dynasty
- Liu Ming (politician, born 1954), Chinese politician, secretary-general of Fujian from 2011 to 2013
- Liu Ming (politician, born 1956), Chinese politician, party secretary of Dali Bai Autonomous Prefecture
