= Governor of Jiangxi =

Governor of the Jiangxi Provincial People's Government
- 江西省人民政府省长
- National Emblem of China

- Flag of China
- Incumbent; Chen Yongqi; Acting since 11 November 2026
- Jiangxi Provincial People's Government
- Type: Governor
- Status: Provincial and ministerial-level official
- Reports to: Jiangxi Provincial People's Congress and its Standing Committee
- Nominator: Presidium of the Jiangxi Provincial People's Congress
- Appointer: Jiangxi Provincial People's Congress
- Term length: Five years, renewable
- Inaugural holder: Shao Shiping
- Formation: June 1949
- Deputy: Deputy Governors; Secretary-General

The governor of Jiangxi, officially the Governor of the Jiangxi Provincial People's Government, is the head of Jiangxi Province and leader of the Jiangxi Provincial People's Government.

The governor is elected by the Jiangxi Provincial People's Congress, and responsible to it and its Standing Committee. The governor is a provincial level official and is responsible for the overall decision-making of the provincial government. The governor is assisted by an executive vice governor as well as several vice governors. The governor generally serves as the deputy secretary of the Jiangxi Provincial Committee of the Chinese Communist Party and as a member of the CCP Central Committee. The governor is the second highest-ranking official in the province after the secretary of the CCP Jiangxi Committee. The current acting governor is Chen Yongqi, who took office on 11 November 2026.

== List of governors ==
=== People's Republic of China ===
No.	Officeholder	Term of office		Party	Ref.
No.	Officeholder	Took office	Left office	Party	Ref.
Governor of the Jiangxi Provincial People's Government
1	Shao Shiping (1900–1965)	May 1949	February 1955	Chinese Communist Party	
Governor of the Jiangxi Provincial People's Committee
(1)	Shao Shiping (1900–1965)	February 1955	September 1965	Chinese Communist Party	
2	Fang Zhichun (1905–1993)	September 1965	January 1968	Chinese Communist Party	
Director of the Jiangxi Revolutionary Committee
3	Cheng Shiqing (1918–2008)	January 1968	April 1972	Chinese Communist Party	
4	She Jide (1916–1981)	June 1972	December 1974	Chinese Communist Party	
5	Jiang Weiqing (1910–2000)	December 1974	December 1979	Chinese Communist Party	
Governor of the Jiangxi Provincial People's Government
6	Bai Dongcai (1916–2014)	December 1979	August 1982	Chinese Communist Party	
7	Zhao Zengyi (1920–1993)	August 1982	June 1985	Chinese Communist Party	
8	Ni Xiance (born 1935)	July 1985	October 1986	Chinese Communist Party	
9	Wu Guanzheng (born 1938)	October 1986	April 1995	Chinese Communist Party	
10	Shu Shengyou (1936–2025)	April 1995	April 2001	Chinese Communist Party	
11	Huang Zhiquan (1942–2026)	April 2001	October 2006	Chinese Communist Party	
12	Wu Xinxiong (born 1954)	31 October 2006	8 June 2011	Chinese Communist Party	
13	Lu Xinshe (born 1956)	8 June 2011	8 July 2016	Chinese Communist Party	
14	Liu Qi (born 1957)	8 July 2016	6 August 2018	Chinese Communist Party	
15	Yi Lianhong (born 1959)	6 August 2018	21 October 2021	Chinese Communist Party	
16	Ye Jianchun (born 1965)	21 October 2021	23 September 2026 (Note: Suspended since 27 August 2026. Resignation accepted by Standing Committee of Jiangxi Provincial People's Congress on 23 September 2026)	Chinese Communist Party	
—	Vacant (Note: Executive Vice Governor Ren Zhufeng presided over government work since 27 August 2026)				
17	Chen Yongqi (born 1967)	11 November 2026	Incumbent	Chinese Communist Party	
