= Hu Changqing =

Chinese politician executed for corruption

- 胡长清

Vice Governor of Jiangxi
- In office January 1998 – December 1999 Serving with Huang Zhiquan, Jiang Zhongping (蒋仲平), Wang Jun, Hu Zhenpeng (胡振鹏)
- Governor: Shu Shengyou

Personal details
- Born: August 24, 1948 Changde, Hunan, China
- Died: March 8, 2000 (aged 51), executed by firing squad Nanchang, Jiangxi, China
- Party: Chinese Communist Party (1969-December 22, 1999 expelled)
- Children: Hu Wei (胡威)
- Education: Hunan Normal University, Chinese Department Cadre Specialized Course (中文系干部专修科)

Hu Changqing (simplified Chinese: 胡长清; 24 August 1948 – 8 March 2000) was a Chinese politician who served as vice governor of Jiangxi. In 2000, he was terminated from employment, sentenced to death for bribery and corruption, and then executed via firing squad.

It is alleged that part of the reason Hu was executed was because he criticized Jiang Zemin, the general secretary of the Chinese Communist Party at the time. Hu thus became the first deputy provincial cadre sentenced to be executed for corruption since the founding of the People's Republic of China.

Hu Changqing had a son named Hu Wei. Hu Changqing once purchased several fake graduation certificates from a Peking University staff member, falsely claiming that Hu obtained degrees there. Moreover, Hu would use false documents for flying on airplanes and staying in hotels.

== Biography ==
=== Early life and education ===
Hu was born on August 24, 1948, to a peasant family in Huangtudian Town in Changde, Hunan. Hu had 4 sisters and one brother. His mother was over 40 years old at the time of his birth. In total, Hu had 8 people in his family. During the Mao-era land reform, they were sent to till more than ten acres of paddy fields and mountain dry fields. In 1954, when he was 6 years old, he started elementary school, collecting firewood and herding cattle in his spare time.

In early 1958, he graduated from primary school and entered Huangtudian Complete Primary School (黄土店完全小学) for senior primary school. In 1960, he graduated from high school and entered Changde County No. 2 Middle School (常德县第二中学) for junior high school. At that time, his father died. In the spring and summer of 1966, he was a senior high school graduate. Later, as an educated youth returning home, he participated in agricultural labor in his hometown. In high school, he became an active member of school activities including calligraphy and writing.

=== Military service and college ===
In March 1968, he was conscripted into the army and served in the engineering unit of the Air Force of the Guangzhou Military Region of the Chinese People's Liberation Army. During his service, he worked with the troops in the construction of Jiuquan Dingxin Airport (酒泉鼎新机场), Inner Mongolia Tumd Left Banner Bikeqi Airport (内蒙古土默特左旗毕克齐机场), Yinchuan Helanshan Airport (银川贺兰山机场), Shaanxi Zhenchuanbao Airport (陕西镇川堡机场), and Golmud Airport (格尔木机场).

In 1969, he joined the Chinese Communist Party (CCP) less than a year after enlisting in the army. In 1970, he became a soldier and served as a platoon leader. Later, he was transferred to the Organization Department of the Political Department of the Air Force Logistics Department of the Guangzhou Military Region as an organization officer.

In 1975, Hu Changqing got married. In 1976, his eldest son Hu Wei (胡威) was born. In 1978, for family reunion, Hu Changqing was transferred to the Air Force Changsha Equipment Ordering Army Representative Office as an officer of the Political Department.

In 1979, he transferred to a local job as a deputy battalion worker and served as the deputy chief of the secretarial section in the office of the Hunan Provincial Labor Department.

In 1982, he passed the adult college entrance examination and entered the cadre training course of the Chinese Department of Hunan Normal University. In 1985, he obtained a college diploma.

=== People's Insurance Company ===
He then entered the Hunan Branch of the People's Insurance Company of China as the deputy director of the office.

In 1986, he became office director of the Hunan Branch of the People's Insurance Company China. In 1987, he was valued by superiors and was transferred to Beijing, where he became deputy director of the office of the People's Insurance Company of China and presided over the office work.

In 1990, he was transferred to the State Taxation Bureau under the centralized management of the Ministry of Finance as the deputy director of the office. In 1991, he became Director of the Office of the State Taxation Bureau.

=== Fake diplomas and political career ===
From 1992 to 1998, Hu purchased and used fake diplomas from Peking University to advance his political career, ultimately becoming vice governor of Jiangxi.

In 1992, Hu Changqing privately purchased a fake diploma from a person named Jiao (焦某), a staff member of the Department of Political Science and Administrative Management of Peking University who was in charge of educational affairs management. The fake diploma was a graduation certificate of the administrative management major (undergraduate) saying he studied at the Correspondence College of Peking University from 1988 to 1991. Hu then officially used this fake certificate in his personnel files.

In November 1993, due to the separation of national tax and local tax, the State Taxation Bureau at the departmental level was reorganized into State Taxation Administration and upgraded to a ministerial-level unit, and the leadership of the General Administration was re-appointed. Hu Changqing was transferred from the national tax system to deputy director of the State Council Bureau of Religious Affairs.

Later, Hu successively became an adjunct professor of ethnic religion and other majors in Peking University, Renmin University of China, and Minzu University of China, and an executive director of the Chinese Calligraphers Association (中国书法家协会).

In August 1995, he was promoted to Assistant Governor of Jiangxi Provincial People's Government. In the second half of 1995, Hu Changqing purchased another fake Bachelor of Law degree certificate of Peking University from the same person named Jiao, who had been transferred from Peking University. In January 1998, he was promoted to Vice Governor of Jiangxi Province.

== Criminal investigation ==
On August 5, 1999, Hu Changqing led the Jiangxi delegation to participate in the 1999 World Horticultural Exposition in Kunming. On August 6, he presided over the opening ceremony of Jiangxi Pavilion Day as the vice-governor of Jiangxi Province. On August 7, he left the delegation to fly alone to Guangzhou. Because he used false documents for flying and staying in hotels in Guangzhou, and his whereabouts were secretive, the central government decided to transfer him back to Beijing for investigation on August 9.

=== Termination of employment ===
On September 29, 1999, with the approval of the Standing Committee of the Jiangxi Provincial People's Congress, the Beijing Municipal Public Security Bureau imposed criminal detention on Hu Changqing. On October 13, 1999, the Supreme People's Procuratorate decided to arrest Hu Changqing according to the law. On December 22, 1999, with the approval of the CCP Central Committee, the Central Commission for Discipline Inspection expelled Hu Changqing from the party. The Jiangxi Provincial Party Committee removed his membership of the party group of the provincial government. The Standing Committee of the Jiangxi Provincial People's Congress removed him from the post of vice governor.

=== Death penalty ===
On January 15, 2000, the Nanchang Intermediate People's Court charged Hu Changqing with corruption, accepting bribes, offering bribes, and illegally accepting a huge amount of property.

Hu was sentenced to death immediately, deprived of political rights for life, and confiscated of all personal property. Hu thus became the first deputy provincial cadre sentenced to death by the court for corruption after the founding of the People's Republic of China.

On March 1, 2000, the Higher People's Court of Jiangxi Province rejected Hu's appeal and upheld the first-instance judgment. On March 7, 2000, the Supreme People's Court made a ruling approving Hu Changqing's death penalty and issued an execution order for Hu's death penalty.

At 8:46 am on March 8, 2000, Hu was shot to death by firing squad at the Yingshang Execution Ground in the northern suburbs of Nanchang.
