= Chen Yongqi =

Chinese politician

- 陈永奇

Governor of Jiangxi
- Acting
- Assumed office 11 November 2026
- Party Secretary: Yin Hong
- Preceded by: Ye Jianchun

Executive Deputy Party Secretary of the Jiangxi Provincial Committee of the Chinese Communist Party
- In office June 2024 – October 2026
- Party Secretary: Yin Hong
- Preceded by: Wu Zhongqiong
- Succeeded by: Zhuang Zhaolin

Head of the Political and Legal Affairs Commission of the Jiangxi Provincial Committee of the Chinese Communist Party
- In office August 2025 – November 2026
- Party Secretary: Yin Hong
- Preceded by: Luo Xiaoyun
- Succeeded by: Zhuang Zhaolin

Executive Vice Chairman of the People's Government of the Tibet Autonomous Region
- In office October 2021 – December 2024
- Chairman: Yan Jinhai
- Preceded by: Zhuang Yan
- Succeeded by: Gong Huicai

Personal details
- Born: November 1967 (age 58–59) Huairen, Shanxi, China
- Party: Chinese Communist Party (1985-)
- Education: Shanxi Normal University; Dongbei University of Finance and Economics; Shanxi University (PhD)

Chen Yongqi (Chinese: 陈永奇; born November 1967) is a Chinese politician, currently serving as the deputy secretary of the Jiangxi Provincial Committee of the Chinese Communist Party since December 2024 and the governor of Jiangxi since November 2026. Previously he was served as the head of the Political and Legal Affairs Commission of the CCP Jiangxi Provincial Committee, the executive vice chairman of the People's Government of the Tibet Autonomous Region and the deputy governor of Shanxi. He is a delegate to the 19th and 20th National Congress of the Chinese Communist Party, and an alternate of the 20th Central Committee of the Chinese Communist Party.

== Career ==
=== Education ===
Chen was born in Huairen, Shanxi in November 1967. He was enrolled to mathematics major of Shanxi Normal University in 1985, and graduated in 1989. In 1989, he was enrolled to Dongbei University of Finance and Economics, and graduated in 1992. In 2002, he was enrolled to Shanxi University, and earned doctor of philosophy in 2006.

=== Liaoning ===
In July 1992, Chen was served as an officer of economy development bureau of Dalian Development Area until April 1993.

=== Shanxi ===
Chen was returned to Shanxi and served as an officer of the policy research office of the Shanxi Provincial Committee of the Chinese Communist Party in April 1993. In November 2006, he was appointed as deputy director of the policy research office, and transferred to research office of the Shanxi Provincial People's Government as deputy director in 2008. He was promoted to director in 2009. In 2011, he was appointed as the deputy secretary-general and party secretary of the office of the Shanxi Provincial People's Government.

In 2013, Chen was appointed as the mayor of Yangquan, and appointed as the party secretary in 2015.

In January 2018, Chen was appointed as the deputy governor of Shanxi.

=== Tibet ===
Chen was transferred to Tibet Autonomous Region in January 2019, and appointed as the head of orgnazation department of the Tibet Autonomous Regional Committee of the Chinese Communist Party.

In October 2021, Chen was appointed as the deputy secretary of the CCP Tibet Autonomous Regional Committee and the executive vice chairman of the People's Government of the Tibet Autonomous Region.

=== Jiangxi ===
In December 2024, Chen was appointed as the executive deputy party secretary of the Jiangxi Provincial Committee of the Chinese Communist Party. He was concurrently served as the head of the Political and Legal Affairs Commission of the CCP Jiangxi Provincial Committee in August 2025.

On 11 November 2026, Chen was appointed as the acting governor of Jiangxi.

Government offices
Preceded by Zhuang Yan	Executive Vice Chairman of the People's Government of the Tibet Autonomous Region; 2021–2024	Succeeded by Gong Huicai
Preceded by Ye Jianchun	Governor of Jiangxi; 2026–	Incumbent
Party political offices
Preceded by Wu Zhongqiong	Executive Deputy Party Secretary of the Jiangxi Provincial Committee of the Chinese Communist Party; 2024–2026	Succeeded by Zhuang Zhaolin
Preceded by Luo Xiaoyun	Head of the Political and Legal Affairs Commission of the Jiangxi Provincial Committee of the Chinese Communist Party; 2025–2026	Succeeded by Zhuang Zhaolin
