= Liu Ming (politician, born 1956) =

Chinese politician (born 1956)

- 刘明

Communist Party Secretary of Dali Bai Autonomous Prefecture
- In office December 2007 – December 2011
- Preceded by: Gu Boping
- Succeeded by: Yin Jianye

Mayor of Lincang
- In office February 2004 – December 2007
- Preceded by: New title
- Succeeded by: He Jianwen

Personal details
- Born: March 1956 (age 70) Shiping County, Yunnan, China
- Party: Chinese Communist Party
- Education: Yunnan University

Chinese name
- Simplified Chinese: 刘明
- Traditional Chinese: 劉明
Transcriptions
Standard Mandarin
- Hanyu Pinyin: Liú Míng

Liu Ming (Chinese: 刘明; born March 1956) is a former Chinese politician who spent most of his career in southwest China's Yunnan province. He was investigated by China's top anti-graft agency in May 2024. He served as director of the Yunnan Provincial Audit Office from 2012 to 2016, party secretary of Dali Bai Autonomous Prefecture from 2007 to 2011, and mayor of Lincang from 2004 to 2007.

== Career ==
Liu was born in Shiping County, Yunnan, in March 1956.

Liu entered the workforce in September 1975, and joined the Chinese Communist Party (CCP) in December 1986. He was appointed as party secretary of Wuhua District in January 1993 and subsequently director of Kunming High-tech Industrial Development Zone in August 1997.

Liu was deputy party secretary of Lincang in February 2004, in addition to serving as deputy director. He became party secretary of Dali Bai Autonomous Prefecture in December 2007, and served until December 2011, when he was appointed director of the Yunnan Provincial Audit Office.

== Downfall ==
On 28 May 2024, Liu surrendered himself to and is cooperating with the Central Commission for Discipline Inspection (CCDI) and National Commission of Supervision for investigation of "suspected violations of disciplines and laws".

Government offices
New title	Mayor of Lincang; 2003–2007	Succeeded by He Jianwen
Party political offices
Preceded by Gu Boping	Communist Party Secretary of Dali Bai Autonomous Prefecture; 2011–2017	Succeeded by Yin Jianye
