= Ma Jikong =

Chinese politician

- 马继孔

Chairman of the Jiangxi Provincial People's Congress
- In office 1983–1985
- Preceded by: Yang Shangkui
- Succeeded by: Wang Shufeng

Personal details
- Born: 1914 Feicheng, Tai'an, Shandong, China
- Died: 2001 (aged 86–87)
- Party: Chinese Communist Party

Ma Jikong (Chinese: 马继孔) (1914–2001) was a Chinese politician. He was born in Feicheng, Tai'an, Shandong. He was People's Congress Chairman of Jiangxi. From 1956 to 1966, he served on the Yunnan Provincial Party Committee. He was a delegate to the 2nd National People's Congress and 6th National People's Congress.

Preceded by Yang Shangkui	People's Congress Chairman of Jiangxi	Succeeded by Wang Shufeng
