= Zhu Zhihong =

Chinese politician (1933–2022)

- 朱治宏

Chairman of CPPCC Jiangxi Committee
- In office 16 June 1994 – 23 March 2003
- Premier: Zhu Rongji
- Preceded by: Liu Fangren
- Succeeded by: Zhong Qihuang

Member of the National People's Congress (8th)
- In office March 1993 – March 1998
- Constituency: Jiangxi

Personal details
- Born: November 1933; Jiangning, Jiangsu, China
- Died: December 20, 2022 (aged 89); Nanchang, Jiangxi, China
- Political party: Chinese Communist Party

Zhu Zhihong (Chinese: 朱治宏; November 1933 – 20 December 2022) was a Chinese politician, and the former chairman of the Jiangxi Provincial Committee of the Chinese People's Political Consultative Conference (CPPCC).

== Biography ==
A native of Jiangning, Jiangsu, Zhu was appointed chairman of the Jiangxi Provincial Discipline Inspection Commission in 1985.

In 1991, he became Deputy Party Committee Secretary of Jiangxi. In 1994, Zhu became Jiangxi CPPCC chairman.

In 2022, Zhihong died from COVID-19.

Preceded by Liu Fangren	CPPCC Committee Chairman of Jiangxi; 1994–2003	Succeeded by Zhong Qihuang
