= Meng Jianzhu =

Chinese politician

- 孟建柱
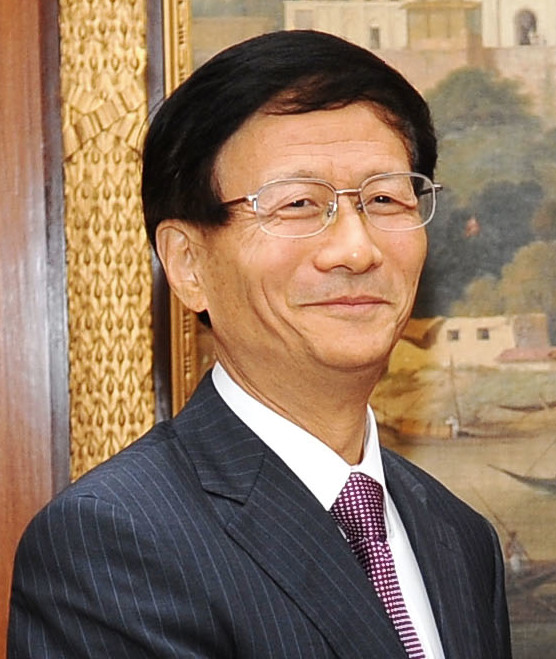
- Meng Jianzhu in New Delhi on November 9, 2016

Secretary of the Central Political and Legal Affairs Commission
- In office 20 November 2012 – 31 October 2017
- Deputy: Guo Shengkun
- General Secretary: Xi Jinping
- Preceded by: Zhou Yongkang
- Succeeded by: Guo Shengkun

Minister of Public Security
- In office 29 October 2007 – 28 December 2012
- Premier: Wen Jiabao
- Preceded by: Zhou Yongkang
- Succeeded by: Guo Shengkun

Party Secretary of Jiangxi
- In office April 2001 – October 2007
- Deputy: Huang Zhiquan (2001–2006); Wu Xinxiong (2006–)
- Preceded by: Shu Huiguo
- Succeeded by: Su Rong

Personal details
- Born: July 1947 (age 79) Wu County, Jiangsu
- Party: Chinese Communist Party
- Education: Shanghai Mechanical College

Meng Jianzhu (Chinese: 孟建柱; pinyin: Mèng Jiànzhù; born July 1947) is a retired Chinese politician best known for his term as the Secretary of the Central Political and Legal Affairs Commission of the Chinese Communist Party between 2012 and 2017. He also headed the Central Public Security Comprehensive Management Commission.

Meng began his career in a farming cooperative based in rural Shanghai. He made his way up the ranks in the city, serving as vice mayor in charge of agriculture, then deputy party secretary. Prior to his tenure as Zhengfawei secretary, he also served as the Minister of Public Security and Party Secretary of Jiangxi Province.

== Biography ==
=== Early life, Shanghai ===
Meng was born in July 1947 in Wu County, a present-day urban district of Suzhou, Jiangsu Province. In the 1960s, he headed to Changxing Island in Shanghai to become a tractor operator. For the next 13 years he worked on the rural agricultural cooperative. He graduated from the Shanghai Mechanical College (now part of University of Shanghai for Science and Technology). He joined the Chinese Communist Party in 1971. He became head of the rural cooperative in 1981.

He spent much of his earlier political career in Shanghai. He served in leading roles in Chuansha County (which became Pudong New District in 1992) and Jiading County, before being transferred to become one of the deputy mayors of Shanghai starting in 1993. His portfolio included was agriculture and rural development. In 1996 he was promoted to become the deputy Party secretary of Shanghai, one of the most powerful positions in China's commercial hub. He held the position until 2001. While in Shanghai Meng was low-key and camera-shy, but was largely popular with city residents.

=== Party secretary of Jiangxi ===
In 2001, Meng was appointed the Party secretary of Jiangxi Province. Some say Meng was transferred out of Shanghai because he had lost out on a struggle to Chen Liangyu become the city's party secretary. Meng and Chen were polar opposites in many ways – Chen preferred to be in the limelight while Meng preferred doing work behind the scenes. Meng was also known for paying regular respects for retired municipal politicians. When Meng arrived in Jiangxi, most residents were optimistic. A common refrain amongst Jiangxi residents at the time was "If Jiangxi wants to be rich, keep Meng Jianzhu!" (“江西要致富，留住孟建柱！”).

While Meng was often regarded by observers as a "soft" leader, he was known for his strong adherence to rules and principles. For example, once during a provincial conference of officials at county level and above, some county leaders did not show up and instead sent their assistants to attend. Meng responded to this by postponing the entire conference until all the required attendees arrived as a means to reprimand those who failed to show. He remained party secretary of Jiangxi until October 28, 2007, when he was transferred to Beijing and appointed the Minister of the Public Security, replacing political heavyweight Zhou Yongkang, who was elevated to become a member of the Politburo Standing Committee of the Chinese Communist Party. Meng also became State councillor in Wen Jiabao government in March 2008.

=== Politburo and Central Political and Legal Affairs Commission ===
Meng became a member of the Politburo of the Chinese Communist Party in November 2012, following the 18th Party Congress. He succeeded Zhou as Secretary of the Central Political and Legal Affairs Commission. However, the commission's powers and autonomy was significantly curbed during Meng's term as a result of the consolidation of power around the central authority of Party general secretary Xi Jinping. In December 2012, he was succeeded by Guo Shengkun as Minister of Public Security. In January 2013, Meng announced that his commission would begin work on abolishing the "re-education through labour" system, which has been widely criticized internationally. This was further cemented at the third plenary session of the 18th Central Committee held in November 2013. The implementation of the policy was largely completed by the end of that year. Meng also criticized the interference of local party authorities, specifically the Political and Legal Affairs Commissions at the local or provincial government level for the practice of interference in individual court cases, compromising the integrity of judicial independence.

While his predecessor Zhou Yongkang underwent investigation for corruption and other offenses in 2014, Meng remained untouched by the scandal despite having served under Zhou for five years as public security minister due to the bad relationship and clashes between Zhou and Meng. Other former subordinates of Zhou in the ministry, such as former deputy minister Li Dongsheng, were detained for investigation.

Meng retired from Politburo and Political and Legal Affairs Commission after the 19th Party Congress in October 2017, when Guo Shengkun succeeded to Meng's position as Secretary of Political and Legal Affairs Commission.

== Personal life ==
Meng's associates and colleagues describe him as soft-spoken, humble, likes to smile, of thin build, and looks like an intellectual.

Party political offices
Preceded by Zhou Yongkang	Secretary of the Central Political and Legal Affairs Commission; 2012–2017	Succeeded by Guo Shengkun
Preceded by Shu Huiguo	Party Secretary of Jiangxi Committee; 2001–2007	Succeeded by Su Rong
Assembly seats
Preceded by Shu Huiguo	Chairman of the Jiangxi People's Congress Standing Committee; 2001–2008	Succeeded by Su Rong
Government offices
Preceded by Zhou Yongkang	Minister of Public Security; 2007–2012	Succeeded by Guo Shengkun
