= Zhong Qihuang =

Chinese politician

- 钟起煌

Chairman of the Jiangxi Provincial Committee of the Chinese People's Political Consultative Conference
- In office January 2003 – February 2007
- Preceded by: Zhu Zhihong
- Succeeded by: Fu Kecheng

Personal details
- Born: October 1943 Yudu County, Jiangxi, China
- Died: 30 August 2024 (aged 80) Nanchang, Jiangxi, China
- Party: Chinese Communist Party

Chinese name
- Simplified Chinese: 钟起煌
- Traditional Chinese: 鐘起煌
Transcriptions
Standard Mandarin
- Hanyu Pinyin: Zhōng Qǐhuáng

Zhong Qihuang (Chinese: 钟起煌; October 1943 – 30 August 2024) was a Chinese politician who served as chairman of the Jiangxi Provincial Committee of the Chinese People's Political Consultative Conference between 2003 and 2007.

He was a representative of the 16th National Congress of the Chinese Communist Party. He was a delegate to the 9th National People's Congress. He was a member of the 10th and 11th National Committee of the Chinese People's Political Consultative Conference.

== Early life and education ==
Zhong was born in Yudu County, Jiangxi, in October 1943. During the ten-year Cultural Revolution, he worked in Jiangxi Ceramic Industry Co., Ltd. He joined the Chinese Communist Party (CCP) in November 1972.

== Career ==
In 1977, Zhong was appointed director and party secretary of Jingdezhen Jianguo Porcelain Factory (景德镇市建国瓷厂). A year later, he became director and deputy party secretary of the Ceramic Industry Science Research Institute of the Ministry of Light Industry. He was deputy party secretary of Jingdezhen in 1983 and subsequently deputy director of Jiangxi Provincial Light Industry Department in 1986. In 1988, he became mayor and deputy party secretary of Jiujiang, rising to party secretary in 1990. He was appointed head of the Publicity Department of the CCP Jiangxi Provincial Committee in March 1992 and a month later was admitted to member of the CCP Jiangxi Provincial Committee, the province's top authority. He was deputy party secretary of Jiangxi in August 1995, and held that office until January 2002, when he was chosen as vice chairperson of Jiangxi Provincial People's Congress. In January 2003, he took office as chairman of the Jiangxi Provincial Committee of the Chinese People's Political Consultative Conference.

In February 2007, Zhong was transferred to Beijing and appointed vice chairperson of the Committee on Culture, Historical Data and Studies of the Chinese People's Political Consultative Conference, serving in the post until his retirement in August 2013.

== Death ==
On 30 August 2024, Zhong died in Nanchang, Jiangxi, at the age of 80.

Assembly seats
Preceded by Zhu Zhihong	Chairman of the Jiangxi Provincial Committee of the Chinese People's Political Consultative Conference; 2003–2007	Succeeded by Fu Kecheng
