= Shu Shengyou =

Chinese politician (1936–2025)

- 舒聖佑

Governor of Jiangxi
- In office April 1995 – April 2001
- Preceded by: Wu Guanzheng
- Succeeded by: Huang Zhiquan

Personal details
- Born: December 1936 Yushan, Jiangxi, China
- Died: 17 March 2025 (aged 88)
- Party: Chinese Communist Party

Shu Shengyou (Chinese: 舒聖佑; December 1936 – 17 March 2025) was a Chinese politician. He was born in Yushan, Jiangxi, and was twice governor of his home province.

Shu was a member of the 15th Central Committee of the Chinese Communist Party with CCP committee secretary Shu Huiguo and deputy CCP committee secretary Huang Zhiquan.

Shu died on 17 March 2025, at the age of 88.

Preceded by Wu Guanzheng	Governor of Jiangxi; 1995–2001	Succeeded by Huang Zhiquan
