= Lu Ziyue =

Chinese politician (born 1962)

- 卢子跃

Mayor of Ningbo
- In office May 2013 – March 2016
- Preceded by: Liu Qi
- Succeeded by: Tang Yijun

Vice-Governor of Zhejiang
- In office January 2013 – May 2013
- Governor: Li Qiang

Communist Party Secretary of Lishui
- In office March 2011 – March 2013
- Preceded by: Chen Ronggao (陈荣高)
- Succeeded by: Wang Yongkang (王永康)

Mayor of Lishui
- In office May 2008 – March 2011
- Preceded by: Chen Ronggao
- Succeeded by: Wang Yongkang

Personal details
- Born: March 1962 (age 64) Yongkang, Zhejiang, China
- Party: Chinese Communist Party (1982–2015; expelled)
- Education: Central Party School of the Chinese Communist Party

Lu Ziyue (simplified Chinese: 卢子跃; traditional Chinese: 盧子躍; pinyin: Lú Zǐyuè; born March 1962) is a former Chinese politician who spent his entire career in east China's Zhejiang province. He was put under investigation by the Chinese Communist Party's anti-corruption agency in March 2016. Previously he served as mayor of Ningbo. He is the second provincial-ministerial rank official sacked for graft from Zhejiang province in the anti-corruption campaign following the 18th Party Congress, after Si Xinliang.

== Biography ==
Lu was born in Yongkang, a county-level city under the jurisdiction of Jinhua, in Zhejiang province, in March 1962. He entered the workforce in November 1979, and joined the Chinese Communist Party in August 1982. He served in various administrative and political roles in Yongkang County before serving as mayor of Dongyang.

In October 2010, he was appointed deputy party boss and mayor of Yiwu, a manufacturing and trading hub for small commodities, and one year later promoted to the party boss position of Lanxi. He was party boss of Linhai in July 2006, and held that office until April 2008. Then he served as deputy party boss of Lishui from April 2008 to January 2009, and Communist Party Secretary, the top political position in the city, from March 2011 to March 2013. He also served as vice-governor of Zhejiang between January 2013 to March 2013.

In May 2013, he was transferred to Ningbo and appointed deputy party boss and mayor, he remained in that position until March 2016, when he was placed under investigation on suspicion of "serious violation of Party discipline" by the ruling Chinese Communist Party's anti-corruption agency. It was reported that Lu may be linked to disgraced Zhejiang official Si Xinliang, who had been under investigation since 2015, and possibly even Ling Jihua. He was expelled from the Communist Party on June 21 for bribery.

On May 31, 2017, Lu was sentenced to life in prison for taking bribes worth 147 million yuan.

Government offices
Preceded by Chen Ronggao (陈荣高)	Mayor of Lishui; 2008–2011	Succeeded by Wang Yongkang
Preceded by Liu Qi	Mayor of Ningbo; 2013–2016	Succeeded by Tang Yijun
Party political offices
Preceded by Chen Ronggao	Communist Party Secretary of Lishui; 2011–2013	Succeeded by Wang Yongkang
