= Wang Ning (general) =

Chinese People's Liberation Army general

Armed Police General Wang Ning
- 王宁
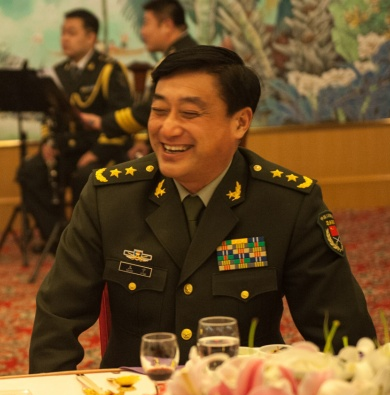
- Wang Ning meeting with Gen. Ray Odierno in 2014.

Commander of the People's Armed Police
- In office December 2014 – December 2020
- Preceded by: Wang Jianping
- Succeeded by: Wang Chunning

Deputy Chief of the People's Liberation Army General Staff Department
- In office June 2013 – December 2014
- Leader: Fang Fenghui
- Preceded by: Sun Jianguo
- Succeeded by: Wang Jianping

Chief of Staff of Beijing Military Region
- In office December 2010 – June 2013
- Preceded by: Zhang Baoshu
- Succeeded by: Bai Jianjun

Personal details
- Born: Wang Luning (王鲁宁); August 1955 (age 71) Nanjing, Jiangsu, China
- Party: Chinese Communist Party

Military service
- Allegiance: People's Republic of China
- Branch/service: People's Liberation Army Ground Force (1970–2014); People's Armed Police (2014–2020)
- Years of service: 1970–2020
- Rank: Armed Police General
- Commands: People's Armed Police; PLAGF 31st Group Army; PLA Jiangxi Provincial Military District
- Battles/wars: Sino-Vietnamese conflicts (1979–1991)

Wang Ning (simplified Chinese: 王宁; traditional Chinese: 王寧; pinyin: Wáng Níng; born August 1955) is a retired general of the People's Liberation Army of China, formerly served as commander of the People's Armed Police. Previously, he served as the deputy chief of the Joint Staff. Wang is a member of the 19th Central Committee of the Chinese Communist Party.

== Career ==
Born Wang Luning (王鲁宁; 王魯寧; Wáng Lǔníng) in Nanjing, Jiangsu in August 1955, with his ancestral home in Rongcheng, Shandong.

Wang joined the People's Liberation Army in 1970, and he was serving in Nanjing Military Region. Between 1986 and 1992, he served as the commander of an artillery regiment in the 12th Group Army. During his time in command, his regiment won a large number of accolades.

In 2003, Wang was appointed as the Chief of Staff of the Shanghai Garrison. In 2006, Wang was elevated to the Commander of Jiangxi Military District, he remained in that position until December 2010, when he was transferred to Beijing and appointed the Chief of Staff of the Beijing Military Region. He was made a lieutenant general in November 2012.

In July 2013, Wang was promoted to become a Deputy General Chief of Staff of the People's Liberation Army General Staff Department In December 2014, Wang became the commander of the People's Armed Police. He had no prior experience in the armed police, so his appointment came as somewhat of a surprise. He retired in December 2020.

On February 28, 2021, he was appointed vice-chairperson of the National People's Congress Constitution and Law Committee.

Wang was a delegate to the 17th National Congress of the Chinese Communist Party and an alternate of the 18th Central Committee of the Chinese Communist Party. He was made a full member of the 19th Central Committee of the Chinese Communist Party in 2017, and remained a full member during the 20th Central Committee.

On 4 November 2026, Wang was removed from his positions as a member of the Standing Committee of the 14th National Committee of the Chinese People's Political Consultative Conference (CPPCC) and vice chairman of the Committee of Foreign Affairs.

Military offices
Preceded by Hao Jingmin	Commander of Jiangxi Military District; 2006–2007	Succeeded by Peng Shuigen
Preceded by Cai Yingting	Commander of 31st Group Army; 2007–2010	Succeeded by Ma Chengxiao
Preceded by Zhang Baoshu	Chief of Staff of Beijing Military Region; 2010–2013	Succeeded by Bai Jianjun
Preceded by Sun Jianguo	Deputy Chief of the People's Liberation Army General Staff Department; 2013–2014	Succeeded by Wang Jianping
Preceded by Wang Jianping	Commander of the People's Armed Police; 2014–2020	Succeeded by Wang Chunning
