= Wu Guanzheng =

Chinese politician (born 1938)

- 吴官正

Secretary of the Central Commission for Discipline Inspection
- In office 15 November 2002 – 22 October 2007
- Deputy: He Yong
- Preceded by: Wei Jianxing
- Succeeded by: He Guoqiang

Personal details
- Born: 11 August 1938 (age 87) Yugan County, Jiangxi, China
- Party: Chinese Communist Party

Wu Guanzheng
- Traditional Chinese: 吳官正
- Simplified Chinese: 吴官正
Transcriptions
Standard Mandarin
- Hanyu Pinyin: Wú Guānzhèng
- Wade–Giles: Wu Kuan-chêng

Wu Guanzheng (born 11 August 1938) is a former Chinese politician and one of the major leaders of the Chinese Communist Party during the administration of Hu Jintao. He served on the Politburo Standing Committee, the country's top ruling body, from 2002 to 2007. During that time he also served as the Secretary of the Central Commission for Discipline Inspection of the Chinese Communist Party, the party's anti-graft body. He had a lengthy political career, having served as mayor of Wuhan, Governor then Party Secretary of Jiangxi, then party chief of Shandong. Wu retired in 2007 and left public life.

== Career ==
Wu was born in Yugan County, Jiangxi province to a poor peasant family. He joined the Chinese Communist Party in March 1963. Wu graduated from the department of thermal engineering at Beijing's Tsinghua University in 1968, where he studied thermal measurement and automated controls. He was then sent to Wuhan during the Cultural Revolution to work as a shop floor technician at the Gedian Chemical Engineering factory, where he was promoted to supervisor a few years later.

Wu served as the mayor of Wuhan from 1983 to 1986. He became the governor of his native province Jiangxi in 1986 after the removal of Ni Xiance by the provincial People's Congress. He was later promoted to Jiangxi party chief and served between 1995 and 1997. He moved to Shandong in 1997 to become the party chief of the province and was made a full member of the Politburo the same year. It was said that Zeng Qinghong, a major confidant of then party General Secretary and President Jiang Zemin, was fond of Wu's work, and recommended him for further elevation, resulting in his promotion to the Politburo in 1997.

Thereafter, Wu was known to have cultivated good relationships with both Jiang Zemin and his putative successor Hu Jintao. Wu and Hu graduated in the same year, both of them alumni of Tsinghua University. Some sources considered him to be Hu's ally, while others consider him to be Jiang's. As a result, he was sometimes included in the list of people in the Shanghai clique. In 2002, Wu joined the Politburo Standing Committee as the head of the Central Commission for Discipline Inspection, the party's anti-graft agency. Wu was seen as an easy compromise candidate since he had "cross-factional appeal". During Wu's time in office on leading CCDI, Shanghai Party Secretary Chen Liangyu has been investigated and arrested by CCDI.

Wu Guanzheng retired from Standing Committee and Central Commission for Discipline Inspection after the 17th Party Congress in October 2007.

Political offices
| Preceded by Ni Xiance | Governor of Jiangxi; 1986–1995 | Succeeded by Shu Shengyou |
Party political offices
| Preceded by Mao Zhiyong | Party Secretary of Jiangxi; 1995–1997 | Succeeded by Shu Huiguo |
| Preceded by Zhao Zhihao | Party Secretary of Shandong; 1997–2002 | Succeeded by Zhang Gaoli |
| Preceded by Wei Jianxing | Secretary of the Central Commission for Discipline Inspection; 2002–2007 | Succeeded by He Guoqiang |
