= Zhao Zengyi =

Chinese politician

Governor of Jiangxi
- In office August 1982 – June 1985
- Preceded by: Bai Dongcai
- Succeeded by: Ni Xiance

Personal details
- Born: 1920 Pingding County, Shanxi, China
- Died: February 27, 1993 (aged 72–73)

Zhao Zengyi (Chinese: 趙增益) (1920 – February 27, 1993) was a People's Republic of China politician. He was born in Pingding County, Shanxi Province. He joined the Chinese Communist Party in October 1937. As a member of the Eighth Route Army during the Second Sino-Japanese War, he saw action in eastern Shanxi Province. During the second phase of the Chinese Civil War, he was active in the border region of Shanxi, Hebei, Shandong and Henan Provinces. After the creation of the People's Republic, he was sent to Kunming in Yunnan Province. He later became governor of Jiangxi Province.

| Preceded by Bai Dongcai | Governor of Jiangxi | Succeeded by Ni Xiance |
