= Huairen =

Huairen 怀仁市
- County-level city
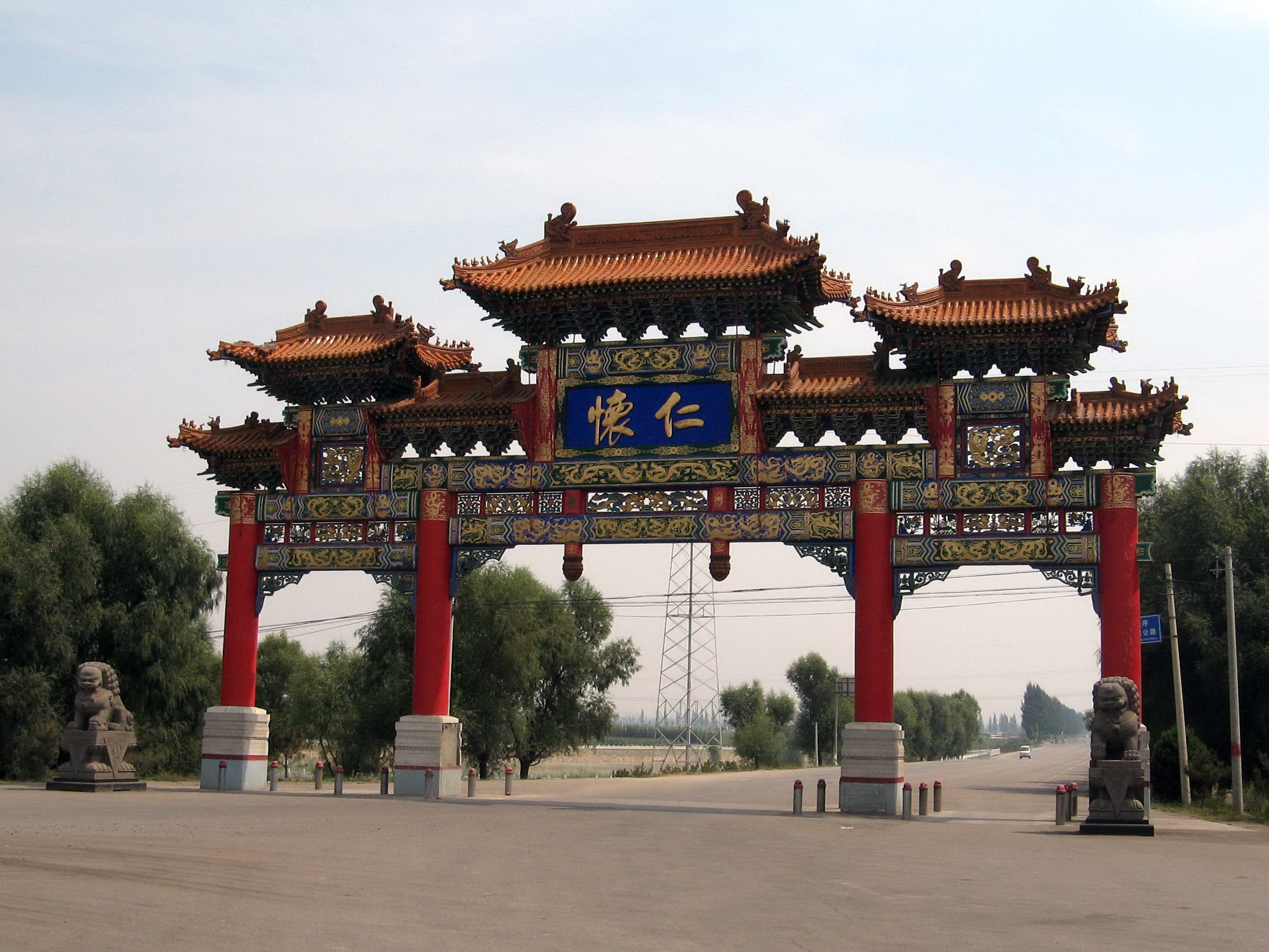

- Location in Shanxi
- Coordinates: 39.8279°N 113.1°E
- Country: People's Republic of China
- Province: Shanxi
- Prefecture-level city: Shuozhou
- Time zone: UTC+8 (China Standard)
- Website: www.zghr.gov.cn

Huairen (simplified Chinese: 怀仁; traditional Chinese: 懷仁; pinyin: Huáirén) is a county-level city in the north of Shanxi province, China. It is under the administration of Shuozhou city.

== Climate ==
Climate data for Huairen, elevation 1,045 m (3,428 ft), (1991–2020 normals, extremes 1991–present)
Month	Jan	Feb	Mar	Apr	May	Jun	Jul	Aug	Sep	Oct	Nov	Dec	Year
Record high °C (°F)	11.2 (52.2)	19.8 (67.6)	26.3 (79.3)	36.0 (96.8)	36.4 (97.5)	39.0 (102.2)	39.2 (102.6)	35.2 (95.4)	35.0 (95.0)	29.2 (84.6)	22.4 (72.3)	15.4 (59.7)	39.2 (102.6)
Mean daily maximum °C (°F)	−2.1 (28.2)	2.9 (37.2)	9.9 (49.8)	18.1 (64.6)	24.2 (75.6)	28.3 (82.9)	29.3 (84.7)	27.5 (81.5)	22.8 (73.0)	15.9 (60.6)	7.1 (44.8)	−0.4 (31.3)	15.3 (59.5)
Daily mean °C (°F)	−8.4 (16.9)	−3.9 (25.0)	3.1 (37.6)	11.0 (51.8)	17.6 (63.7)	21.7 (71.1)	23.4 (74.1)	21.7 (71.1)	16.4 (61.5)	9.2 (48.6)	0.8 (33.4)	−6.2 (20.8)	8.9 (48.0)
Mean daily minimum °C (°F)	−13.4 (7.9)	−9.5 (14.9)	−2.9 (26.8)	4.3 (39.7)	10.7 (51.3)	15.5 (59.9)	18.1 (64.6)	16.5 (61.7)	10.7 (51.3)	3.7 (38.7)	−4.1 (24.6)	−10.8 (12.6)	3.2 (37.8)
Record low °C (°F)	−24.5 (−12.1)	−22.2 (−8.0)	−17.3 (0.9)	−7.5 (18.5)	−1.9 (28.6)	5.4 (41.7)	11.7 (53.1)	9.1 (48.4)	1.2 (34.2)	−9.1 (15.6)	−20.2 (−4.4)	−25.1 (−13.2)	−25.1 (−13.2)
Average precipitation mm (inches)	2.0 (0.08)	3.4 (0.13)	8.9 (0.35)	21.2 (0.83)	35.8 (1.41)	48.5 (1.91)	96.9 (3.81)	77.5 (3.05)	54.6 (2.15)	22.9 (0.90)	9.2 (0.36)	1.8 (0.07)	382.7 (15.05)
Average precipitation days (≥ 0.1 mm)	1.9	2.5	3.3	4.7	6.8	10.6	12.6	11.4	9.2	5.6	2.9	1.5	73
Average snowy days	3.4	4.2	3.7	1.6	0.1	0	0	0	0	0.6	3.3	3.1	20
Average relative humidity (%)	46	40	35	34	36	47	60	63	58	51	48	46	47
Mean monthly sunshine hours	191.8	200.6	240.7	253.9	275.5	253.2	251.9	243.4	223.4	221.6	193.6	184.6	2,734.2
Percentage possible sunshine	64	66	65	63	62	57	56	58	61	65	65	64	62
Source: China Meteorological Administration
