= Meng Xiancheng =

Meng Xiancheng (Chinese: 孟宪承; 1899–1967) was a Chinese educator in China, and the first president of East China Normal University in Shanghai.

== Education ==
Meng Xiancheng graduated from St. John's University, Shanghai in 1916. Later he was awarded the Master of Education from the George Washington University and went to the postgraduate school of the University of London for further studies. He was the only professor in education studies amongst the first 29 professors appointed by the Ministry of Education in 1942.
