= Shu Huiguo =

Chinese politician

Shu Huiguo (Chinese: 舒惠國) (born July 1938) was a People's Republic of China politician. He was born in Jing'an County, Jiangxi. He was Chinese Communist Party Committee Secretary and People's Congress Chairman of his home province. He was a graduate of Jiangxi Agricultural University.

== Footnotes ==
Preceded by Wu Guanzheng	Communist Party Chiefs of Jiangxi; 1997–2001	Succeeded by Meng Jianzhu
Preceded by Mao Zhiyong	People's Congress Chairman of Jiangxi; 1998–2001	Succeeded by Meng Jianzhu
