= Yang Shangkui =

- 杨尚奎

Party Secretary of Jiangxi
- In office 1952–1966

Member of the Standing Committee of the National People's Congress
- In office February 1978 – June 1983

Member of the Central Advisory Commission
- In office September 1982 – September 1985

Yang Shangkui (Chinese: 楊尚奎; 1905 – November 7, 1986) was a Chinese Communist revolutionary-turned-politician, best known for serving as the First Secretary of his home province Jiangxi between 1956 and 1966, and again between 1976 and 1982.

He was born in Xingguo County, Jiangxi Province, to a family of peasants. As a child, he herded cows and collected manure, and along with his family served the local landowners. He joined a local militia in Xingguo County in his youth. In 1929 when Mao and Zhu De arrived in the Xingguo area, Yang greeted them. He joined the Communist Party in September 1929. He then worked as the head of a local Soviet, as head of propaganda in Ningdu County and then as the party organization leader in Shengli County (later abolished). He worked under Li Fuchun, then head of the party in Jiangxi, and eventually was named party chief of Shicheng County.

He later worked in northeastern China, then returned to Jiangxi. Despite becoming the Party Secretary of Jiangxi in 1952, he only rose to the province's top political position in 1956. He was purged during the Cultural Revolution and worked as a printing factory worker. He was restored to his government posts in 1973; between 1979 and 1983 he served as the Chairman of the People's Congress of Jiangxi. After completing his term he became a member of the Central Advisory Commission.

Yang Shangkui died in 1986. After his death, CAC Vice Chairman Bo Yibo publicly praised him as an ideal revolutionary.

Preceded by Chen Zhengren	Communist Party Secretary of Jiangxi; 1956–1966	Succeeded by Cheng Shiqing
Preceded by New office	People's Congress Chairman of Jiangxi	Succeeded by Ma Jikong
