= Mao Guanglie =

Chinese politician (born 1955)

Mao Guanglie (Chinese: 毛光烈; pinyin: Máo Guāngliè; born February 1955) was the mayor of Ningbo, Zhejiang, China, from 2005 to 2011. As mayor, he was directly responsible for the Ningbo Municipal Bureau of Finance and Ningbo Municipal Auditing Bureau. He was also a part-time postgraduate student at the Central Party School of the Chinese Communist Party.

He previously served as Vice Secretary of the Yongkang County Committee of the Chinese Communist Party, Deputy Party Secretary, and mayor of Yiwu City, as a member of the Standing Committee of the Jinhua Municipal Communist Party, Vice Mayor and Vice Secretary of the Jinhua Municipal Committee of the CPC, and as mayor of Jinhua City. He later served as head of the Zhejiang Provincial Department of Geology and Mineral Resources and as general secretary of the department, then as head of Zhejiang Provincial Department of Science and Technology and as its general secretary; and finally, as director of the Zhejiang Province Development and Reform Commission, and as Communist Party Secretary for the commission.
