= Zhang Lixiong =

Chinese politician (1913–2024)

- 张力雄

Deputy of 4th National People's Congress
- In office 1975–1978

Personal details
- Born: 21 November 1913 Shanghang County, Fujian, Republic of China (now China)
- Died: 2 April 2024 (aged 110 years, 133 days) Nanjing, Jiangsu, China
- Party: Chinese Communist Party
- Military career
- Allegiance: (China)
- Branch: People's Liberation Army
- Service years: 1961–2024
- Rank: Major general

Zhang Lixiong (Chinese: 张力雄, pinyin: Zhāng Lìxióng; 21 November 1913 – 2 April 2024), also known as Zhang Hengshi (Chinese: 张恒时, pinyin: Zhāng Héngshí) was a Chinese politician, major general of the People's Liberation Army, and supercentenarian.

== Biography ==
Zhang was born to a farming family on 21 November 1913 in Cangyun Village in Tongxian Township in Fujian.

Zhang joined the Communist Youth League of China in 1929 and the Chinese Communist Party in 1931. Following the end of the Chinese Civil War and the founding of the People's Republic of China in 1949, he was promoted to a major general of the People's Liberation Army in 1961. He served as a deputy in the 4th National People's Congress from 1975 to 1978. He was one of the last surviving founding generals in the PLA.

Zhang died on 2 April 2024, at the age of 110 years, 133 days.
