= Song Fulong =

- 宋福龙
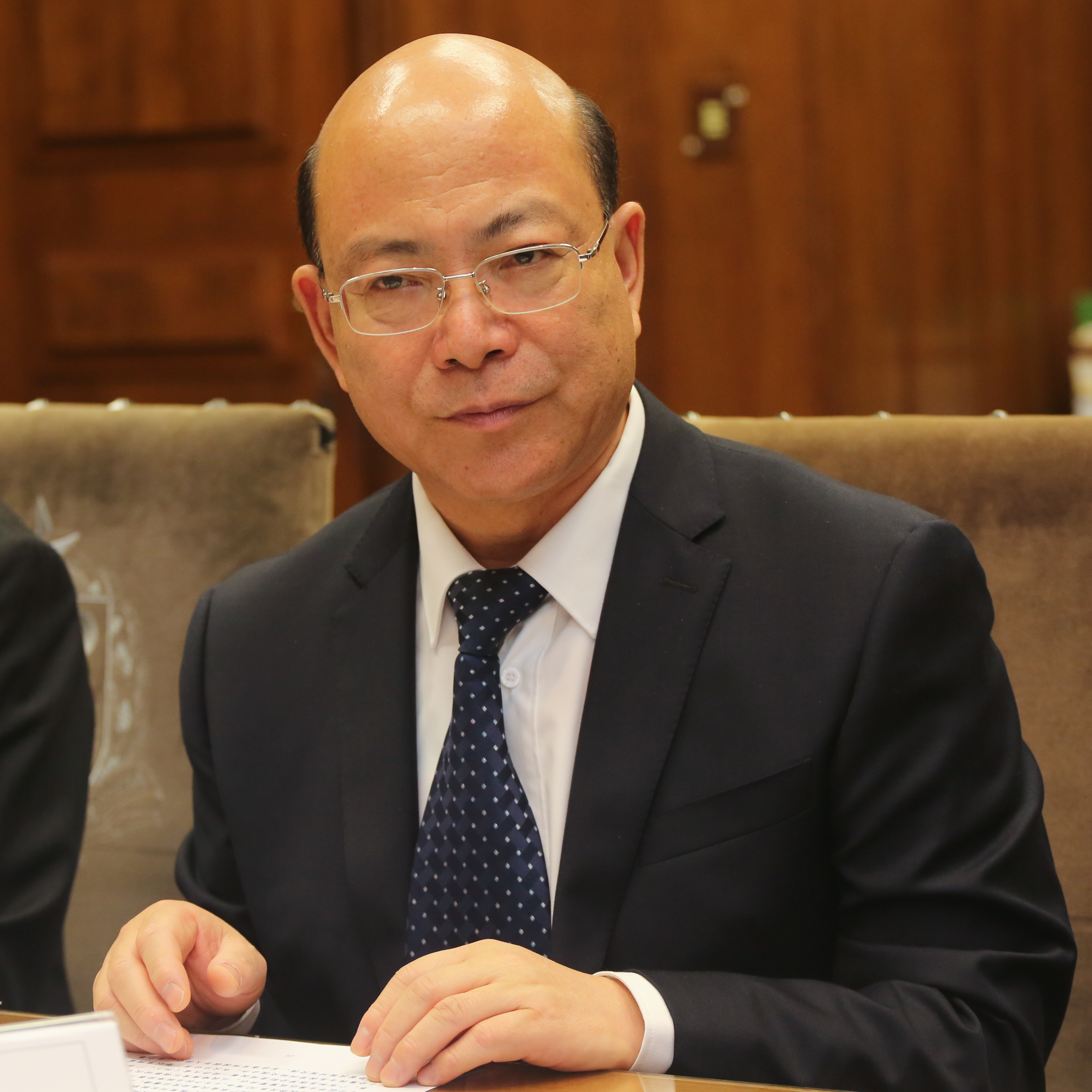
- Song in 2023

Chairperson of the Jiangxi Provincial Committee of the Chinese People's Political Consultative Conference
- Incumbent
- Assumed office January 2025
- Preceded by: Tang Yijun

Personal details
- Born: August 1964 (age 62) Qingyuan County, Hebei, China
- Party: Chinese Communist Party
- Education: Hebei Agricultural University

Chinese name
- Simplified Chinese: 宋福龙
- Traditional Chinese: 宋福龍
Transcriptions
Standard Mandarin
- Hanyu Pinyin: Sòng Fúlóng

Song Fulong (Chinese: 宋福龙; born August 1964) is a Chinese politician, currently serving as chairperson of the Jiangxi Provincial Committee of the Chinese People's Political Consultative Conference. He is a member of the 19th and 20th Central Commissions for Discipline Inspection (CCDI), a representative to the 20th National Congress of the Chinese Communist Party, and a deputy to the 14th National People's Congress.

== Early life and education ==
Born in Qingyuan County, Hebei in August 1964, Song pursued his higher education at Hebei Agricultural University from 1983 to 1987, majoring in plant protection within the Department of Plant Protection.

He began his career in 1987 as a staff member at the Science and Technology Association of Qingyuan County in Hebei. During this period, he joined the Chinese Communist Party (CCP) in March 1990. He joined the disciplinary inspection system in 1991 at the Baoding City Commission for Discipline Inspection as an inspector.

After a period of secondment, Song was transferred to the Central Commission for Discipline Inspection (CCDI), where he held several key positions, such as: deputy division-level inspector and supervisor of the General Office, deputy director and then director of the Information Department of the General Office, deputy director of the Beijing Training Center, deputy director and then director of the Beidaihe Training Center, director of the Law and Enforcement Supervision Office, director of the 10th Discipline Inspection and Supervision Office, leader of the CCDI Discipline Inspection Group stationed at the Ministry of Transport, and leader of the CCDI and National Commission of Supervision Discipline Inspection and Supervision Group stationed at the Ministry of Transport.

In 2021, Song was appointed secretary of the Guangdong Provincial Commission for Discipline Inspection and was admitted to standing committee member of the CCP Guangdong Provincial Committee, the province's top authority. It would be his first job as a key provincial leadership role. He also served as the director of the Provincial Supervision Commission since 2022.

At the end of 2024, Song was transferred to east China's Jiangxi province and appointed party branch secretary of the Jiangxi Provincial Committee of the Chinese People's Political Consultative Conference. In January 2025, he was elected as chairperson.

Party political offices
Preceded by Li Jianbo	Leader of the CCDI Discipline Inspection Group stationed at the Ministry of Transport; 2015–2018	Succeeded by Position revoked
Preceded by Shi Kehui	Secretary of the Guangdong Provincial Commission for Discipline Inspection of the Chinese Communist Party; 2021–2024	Succeeded by Ma Senshu
Government offices
New title	Leader of the CCDI and National Commission of Supervision Discipline Inspection and Supervision Group stationed at the Ministry of Transport. 2018–2021	Succeeded by Zou Tianjing
Preceded by Shi Kehui	Director of the Guangdong Provincial Supervision Commission; 2021–2025	Succeeded by Ma Senshu
Assembly seats
Preceded by Tang Yijun	Chairperson of the Jiangxi Provincial Committee of the Chinese People's Political Consultative Conference; 2025–present	Incumbent
