= Yu Yunbo =

Chinese politician (1936–2022)

- 俞云波

Vice President of China Zhi Gong Party
- In office 1997–2002
- President: Luo Haocai

Personal details
- Born: January 1936 Fuqing County, Fujian, China
- Died: 25 June 2022 (aged 86) Shanghai, China
- Party: China Zhi Gong Party
- Education: Renmin University of China

Chinese name
- Simplified Chinese: 俞云波
- Traditional Chinese: 兪雲波
Transcriptions
Standard Mandarin
- Hanyu Pinyin: Yú Yúnbō

Yu Yunbo (Chinese: 俞云波; January 1936 – 25 June 2022) was a Chinese politician who served as vice chairman of the Shanghai Municipal Committee of the Chinese People's Political Consultative Conference and deputy procurator-general of Shanghai People's Procuratorate. He also served as vice president of China Zhi Gong Party from 1997 to 2002.

He was a member of the 7th and 8th National Committee of the Chinese People's Political Consultative Conference and was a member of the Standing Committee of the 9th and 10th Chinese People's Political Consultative Conference.

== Biography ==
Yu was born in Fuqing County (now Fuqing), Fujian in January 1936 but was raised in Dutch East Indies (now Indonesia). He settled down in China in 1952.

After graduating from the Department of International Politics, Renmin University of China, in 1960, he worked in north China's Shanxi province. He joined the faculty of Fudan University in 1974, and worked there until 1985. Since 1985, he worked in the Shanghai Municipal Committee of China Zhi Gong Party. He was deputy procurator-general of Shanghai People's Procuratorate in April 1991, and held that office until November 1996, when he was appointed vice president of the All-China Federation of Returned Overseas Chinese. In 1997, he rose to become vice president of China Zhi Gong Party.

On 25 June 2022, he died of an illness in Shanghai, at the age of 86.

== Autobiography ==
- 宇下草野烟云路 一位追梦归侨的自述 [Cloud Road in the Grass Field under the Sky: a Self Account of a Returned Overseas Chinese Pursuing a Dream] (in Chinese). Shanghai: Shanghai People's Publishing House. 2014. ISBN 9787208124011.
