= Ni Xiance =

Chinese politician

Governor of Jiangxi
- In office July 1985 – October 1986
- Preceded by: Zhao Zengyi
- Succeeded by: Wu Guanzheng

Personal details
- Born: 1935 (age 90–91)
- Party: Chinese Communist Party

Ni Xiance (Chinese: 倪獻策) (born 1935) is a People's Republic of China politician. He was governor of Jiangxi (1985-1986).

Preceded by Zhao Zengyi	Governor of Jiangxi; 1985–1986	Succeeded by Wu Guanzheng
