= Chen Haozhu =

Chinese cardiologist (1924–2020)

Chen Haozhu (Chinese: 陈灏珠; 6 November 1924 – 30 October 2020) was a Chinese cardiologist.

== Career ==
Chen was born on 6 November 1924 and attended National Zhongzheng Medical College, where he completed a bachelor's degree in 1949. He was responsible for introducing the term "myocardial infarction" to Chinese medical professionals, and is credited with pioneering modern cardiology in China by using newer methods of treatment and diagnosis. Chen was the director of the Shanghai Institute of Cardiovascular Diseases and served as vice chair of the Chinese Society of Cardiology, as well as the Chinese Medical Association. He taught as a professor at Zhongshan Hospital, affiliated to Fudan University, and was elected a member of the Chinese Academy of Engineering in 1997.

Chen died on 30 October 2020, aged 95.
