= Yan Dongsheng =

Chinese chemist and material scientist (1918–2016)

- 严东生
- Born: February 10, 1918; Shanghai, China
- Died: September 18, 2016 (aged 98); Shanghai, China
- Education: Tsinghua University; Yenching University; University of Illinois
- Spouse: Sun Birou (m. 1943–2016)
- Awards: National Prize for Natural Sciences, Third Class (1981); National Invention Prize, First Class (1981)
- Scientific career
- Fields: Inorganic chemistry Materials science
- Workplaces: Shanghai Institute of Ceramics, Chinese Academy of Sciences

Chinese name
- Traditional Chinese: 嚴東生
- Simplified Chinese: 严东生
Transcriptions
Standard Mandarin
- Hanyu Pinyin: Yán Dōngshēng
- Wade–Giles: Yen² Tung¹-sheng¹

Yan Dongsheng (Chinese: 严东生; 10 February 1918 – 18 September 2016), also known as Tung-sheng Yen or T. S. Yen, was a Chinese inorganic chemist and material scientist. He was a fellow of the Chinese Academy of Sciences and the Chinese Academy of Engineering. He was a member of the Chinese Communist Party and Jiu San Society. He was a Standing Committee member of the 6th and 7th Chinese People's Political Consultative Conference.

== Biography ==
Yan was born into an intellectual family, in Shanghai, on February 10, 1918. His father was a graduate of Peiyang University (now Tianjin University) and worked in the Beijing-Hankou Railway Administration as an engineer. His mother was an alumna of Hangzhou Woman Normal College. Yan attended Beijing Chongde High School, during that time, he developed an interest in science and English. In 1935 he studied chemistry at the beginning in Tsinghua University, but transferred to Yenching University two year later. After graduation, he worked there as a teaching assistant under his mentor Zhang Zigao.

In 1941, the Pacific War broke out, because of the university suspended for the war, Yan was employed in Private China University alongside Zhang Zigao. The next year, he was employed in Tangshan Kailuan Refractories Company (唐山开滦耐火材料厂) as an engineer.

In 1946, he pursued advanced studies in the United States. Yan earned a PhD from the University of Illinois in 1949 and did postdoctoral work in the United States in 1950. He returned to China later in 1950.

He returned to China in 1950 and that year became a researcher at the Institute of Metallurgy and Ceramics of Chinese Academy of Sciences (CAS) (中国科学院上海冶金陶瓷研究所). Then he was promoted to director in 1954. He joined the Jiu San Society in 1956. In 1960s he became the vice-president of the Shanghai Institute of Ceramics, Chinese Academy of Sciences (中国科学院上海硅酸盐研究所).

During the Cultural Revolution, he was labeled a "reactionary authority" (反动学术权威) and suffered political persecution.

In 1976, Hua Guofeng and Ye Jianying overthrew the Gang of Four, he was rehabilitated. That same year, he served as president of the Shanghai Institute of Ceramics, Chinese Academy of Sciences and vice-president of the Shanghai Branch of Chinese Academy of Science. In 1977, he was invited to attend the National Working Conference on Science and Education (全国科教工作座谈会), which was presided by the comeback politician Deng Xiaoping. Yan was elected vice-president of the Chinese Academy of Sciences in 1981, and three years later promoted to First Vice-president and Party Group Secretary positions.

In his later years, he served as special advisor of the Chinese Academy of Sciences, honorary president of the Shanghai Institute of Ceramics, Chinese Academy of Sciences, chairman of the Chinese Chemical Society, honorary chairman of the China Ceramic Society, adjunct professor of Tianjin University, honorary president of Shanghai University, and president of the Shanghai Overseas Returned Scholars Association.

On September 18, 2016, he died of illness in Shanghai, aged 98.

== Personal life ==
In 1943 Yan married his classmate Sun Birou, who is a scientist and professor at Shanghai Jiao Tong University.

== Awards ==
- Third Prize of the National Prize for Natural Sciences (1981)
- First Prize of the National Invention Prize (1981)
