= Liu Jingji =

Chinese politician

Liu Jingji (Chinese: 刘靖基; September 15, 1902 – February 15, 1997) was a Chinese male politician, who served as the Vice Chairperson of the Chinese People's Political Consultative Conference.
