= Li Jianbo (politician) =

Chinese politician

- 李建波

Member of the Central Commission for Discipline Inspection
- In office November 2012 – January 2017
- Secretary: Wang Qishan

Leader of the Discipline Inspection Team sent by Central Commission for Discipline Inspection to Ministry of Transport
- In office April 2012 – December 2015
- Preceded by: Yang Limin
- Succeeded by: Song Fulong

Personal details
- Born: February 1959 (age 67) Gongyi, Henan, China
- Party: Chinese Communist Party

Li Jianbo (Chinese: 李建波; pinyin: Lǐ Jiànbō; born February 1959) is a Chinese politician. At the height of his career, he served as a member of the Central Commission for Discipline Inspection (CCDI), the party's highest internal-control institution. He was removed from membership of the CCDI in January 2017.

He was a member of the 18th Central Commission for Discipline Inspection.

== Biography ==
Li was born in Gongyi, Henan in February 1959. After university, he successively worked in Luoyang Municipal Commission for Discipline Inspection, Henan Provincial Party Committee office, Research Office of the Central Commission for Discipline Inspection, Linyi Municipal Committee, and the General Office of the Chinese Communist Party.

Beginning in November 1995, he served in several posts in the General Office of the Chinese Communist Party, including associate director of politics Division of Research and Investigation Section, director of Science Education Division, and director of Legal Affairs Office.

In September 2003 he was promoted to become director of Confidential communications Bureau, a position he held for almost ten years until he was appointed Leader of the Discipline Inspection Team sent by Central Commission for Discipline Inspection to Ministry of Transport.

In January 2017, the CCDI gave him a serious warning as a measure of party discipline (党内严重警告), and he was removed from membership of the CCDI.

On 10 July 2026, Li was suspected of "serious violations of laws and regulations" by the Central Commission for Discipline Inspection (CCDI), the party's internal disciplinary body, and the National Supervisory Commission, the highest anti-corruption agency of China.

Party political offices
Preceded by Yang Limin (杨利民)	Leader of the Discipline Inspection Team sent by Central Commission for Discipline Inspection to Ministry of Transport; 2012–2015	Succeeded by Song Fulong
