= Ye Jianchun =

Chinese engineer and politician

- 叶建春

Governor of Jiangxi
- In office 21 October 2021 – 23 September 2026
- Party Secretary: Yi Lianhong; Yin Hong
- Preceded by: Yi Lianhong
- Succeeded by: Chen Yongqi (acting)

Personal details
- Born: July 1965 (age 61) Zhouning County, Fujian, China
- Party: Chinese Communist Party
- Education: Hohai University

Chinese name
- Simplified Chinese: 叶建春
- Traditional Chinese: 葉建春
Transcriptions
Standard Mandarin
- Hanyu Pinyin: Yè Jiànchūn

Ye Jianchun (Chinese: 叶建春; born July 1965) is a Chinese engineer and politician who is served as governor of Jiangxi from 2021 to 2026. Previously he served as vice minister of Emergency Management and vice minister of Water Resources.

== Biography ==
Ye was born in Zhouning County, Fujian, in July 1965. In 1980, he enrolled in East China Water Conservancy Institute (now Hohai University), majoring in water conservancy and hydropower engineering construction, where he graduated in 1984.

In August 1984, he was appointed as an official in Shanghai Survey, Design and Research Institute and over a period of 19 years worked his way up to the position of president. He joined the Chinese Communist Party (CCP) in December 1985.

Beginning in June 2005, he served in several posts in the Ministry of Water Resources, including director of Taihu Lake Basin Authority (2005–2016), director of Finance Division (2016–2017), and vice minister (2017–2021). He also served as secretary-general of State Flood Control and Drought Relief Headquarters from 2017 to 2020 and vice minister of Emergency Management from 2018 to 2020.

In February 2021, he was transferred to central China's Jiangxi province and appointed deputy party secretary. In October 2021, he took office as party branch secretary of Jiangxi, becoming the youngest head of the provincial administrative region government in China. On October 21, he was made acting governor of Jiangxi.

== Investigation ==
On 27 August 2026, Ye was suspected of "serious violations of laws and regulations" by the Central Commission for Discipline Inspection (CCDI), the party's internal disciplinary body, and the National Supervisory Commission, the highest anti-corruption agency of China.

Party political offices
Preceded by Li Bingjun	Deputy Communist Party Secretary of Jiangxi; 2021	Succeeded by Wu Zhongqiong
Government offices
Preceded by Liu Ning	Secretary-General of State Flood Control and Drought Relief Headquarters; 2017–2020	Succeeded by Zhou Xuewen
Preceded by Yi Lianhong	Governor of Jiangxi; 2021–2026	Succeeded by Chen Yongqi
