= Liu Qi (politician, born 1957) =

Chinese politician

- 刘奇
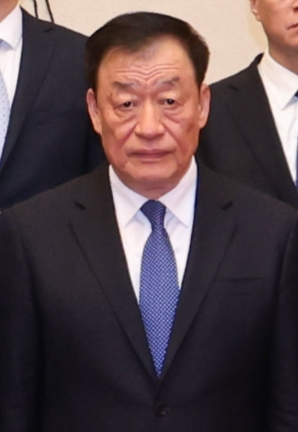

Secretary-General of the Standing Committee of the National People's Congress
- Incumbent
- Assumed office 10 March 2023
- Chairman: Zhao Leji
- Preceded by: Yang Zhenwu

Party Secretary of Jiangxi
- In office 21 March 2018 – 18 October 2021
- Deputy: Yi Lianhong (Governor)
- Preceded by: Lu Xinshe
- Succeeded by: Yi Lianhong

Chairman of Jiangxi People's Congress
- In office October 2018 – January 2022
- Preceded by: Lu Xinshe
- Succeeded by: Yi Lianhong

Governor of Jiangxi
- In office 8 July 2016 – 6 August 2018
- Preceded by: Lu Xinshe
- Succeeded by: Yi Lianhong

Personal details
- Born: September 1956 (age 70) Yishui County, Shandong
- Party: Chinese Communist Party
- Education: Zhejiang University; Xi'an Jiaotong University

Chinese name
- Simplified Chinese: 刘奇
- Traditional Chinese: 劉奇
Transcriptions
Standard Mandarin
- Hanyu Pinyin: Liú Qí

Liu Qi (Note: Chinese: 刘奇; pinyin: Liú Qí) (born September 1956) is a Chinese politician who is currently the secretary-general of the Standing Committee of the National People's Congress.

Liu previously served as the Chinese Communist Party Committee Secretary of Jiangxi from 2018 to 2021, and as the Governor of Jiangxi from 2016 to 2018. Liu spent most of his career in Zhejiang province.

== Career ==
Liu Qi was born in Yishui County, Shandong. During the Cultural Revolution, Liu became a rusticated youth performing manual labour in Wuyi County. He graduated from Zhejiang University with a degree in chemical engineering, and also has a graduate degree from Xi'an Jiaotong University and a doctorate in economics.

After graduating university, Liu was given a job at a state-owned chemical engineering company in Quzhou, where he rose from a dispatcher to the chief executive. He then took on jobs in the provincial department of petroleum, the provincial planning agency, then at Quzhou-based Juhua Corporation, before entering politics as mayor of Wenzhou, then head of the Zhejiang provincial Development and Reform Commission. During this period he worked directly under then Zhejiang party chief Xi Jinping.

In 2008, Liu was named head of the provincial federation of trade unions, and in January 2011, the mayor of Ningbo. He succeeded Wang Huizhong to become party chief of Ningbo in April 2013, and was transferred to Jiangxi in 2016. He had only been the deputy party chief of Jiangxi for several months when he was promoted one step further to become acting Governor of Jiangxi in July 2016, confirmed on September 28, 2016.

On March 21, 2018, Liu was appointed the Party Secretary of Jiangxi.

On 23 October 2021, he was appointed vice chairperson of the National People's Congress Environment Protection and Resources Conservation Committee.

== Notes ==
Government offices
Preceded by Qian Xingzhong	Mayor of Wenzhou; 2003–2006	Succeeded by Shao Zhanwei
Preceded by Shi Jiuwu	Director of Zhejiang Development and Reform Commission; 2006–2008	Succeeded by Li Zhihai
Preceded by Mao Guanglie	Mayor of Ningbo; 2011–2013	Succeeded by Lu Ziyue
Preceded by Lu Xinshe	Governor of Jiangxi; 2016–2018	Succeeded by Yi Lianhong
Party political offices
Preceded by Wang Huizhong	Party Secretary of Ningbo; 2013–2016	Succeeded by Tang Yijun
Preceded by Mo Jiancheng	Deputy Party Secretary of Jiangxi; 2016	Succeeded by Yao Zengke
Preceded by Lu Xinshe	Party Secretary of Jiangxi; 2018–2021	Succeeded by Yi Lianhong
Assembly seats
Preceded by Lu Xinshe	Chairman of Jiangxi People's Congress; 2018–2022	Succeeded by Yi Lianhong
