= Jiang Weiqing =

Chinese politician

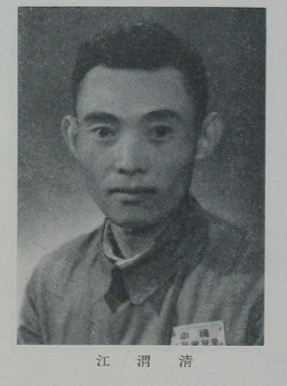

Governor of Jiangxi
- In office December 1974 – December 1979
- Preceded by: She Jide
- Succeeded by: Bai Dongcai

Personal details
- Born: November 26, 1910 Pingjiang County, Hunan, China
- Died: June 16, 2000 (aged 89)
- Party: Chinese Communist Party

Jiang Weiqing (Chinese: 江渭清) (November 26, 1910 – June 16, 2000) was a People's Republic of China politician. He was born in Pingjiang County, Hunan Province. He was Chinese Communist Party Committee Secretary and CPPCC Committee Chairman of Jiangsu Province and Chinese Communist Party Committee Secretary of Jiangxi Province.

| Preceded by Ke Qingshi | Party Secretary of Jiangsu; 1954–1967 | Succeeded by Xu Shiyou |
| Preceded by new office | CPPCC Committee Chairman of Jiangsu; 1955–1967 | Succeeded by vacant until 1977, then Xu Jiatun |
| Preceded by Cheng Shiqing | Party Secretary of Jiangxi (Chairman of the Revolutionary Committee 1974–1978); 1974–1982 | Succeeded by Bai Dongcai |
| Preceded by She Jide | Governor of Jiangxi; 1974–1979 | Succeeded by Bai Dongcai |
