= Wang Shufeng =

Chinese politician

Wang Shufeng (Chinese: 王书枫) (1923–1998) was a People's Republic of China politician. He was born in Luoyang, Henan. He was People's Congress Chairman of Jiangxi. He was a delegate to the 6th National People's Congress and 7th National People's Congress.

Preceded by Ma Jikong	People's Congress Chairman of Jiangxi	Succeeded by Xu Qin
