= Lu Xinshe =

Chinese politician

- 鹿心社

Party Secretary of Guangxi
- In office 21 March 2018 – 19 October 2021
- Deputy: Chen Wu; Lan Tianli
- Preceded by: Peng Qinghua
- Succeeded by: Liu Ning

Chairman of Guangxi People's Congress
- In office January 2019 – January 2022
- Preceded by: Peng Qinghua
- Succeeded by: Liu Ning

Party Secretary of Jiangxi
- In office 29 June 2016 – 21 March 2018
- Deputy: Liu Qi
- Preceded by: Qiang Wei
- Succeeded by: Liu Qi

Chairman of Jiangxi People's Congress
- In office January 2017 – October 2018
- Preceded by: Qiang Wei
- Succeeded by: Liu Qi

Governor of Jiangxi
- In office 8 June 2011 – 8 July 2016
- Party Secretary: Su Rong; Qiang Wei
- Preceded by: Wu Xinxiong
- Succeeded by: Liu Qi

Director of State Bureau of Surveying and Mapping
- In office 9 November 2005 – 23 October 2008
- Premier: Wen Jiabao
- Preceded by: Chen Bangzhu
- Succeeded by: Xu Deming

Personal details
- Born: November 1956 (age 69) Juye County, Shandong
- Party: Chinese Communist Party
- Education: Wuhan University

Lu Xinshe (Chinese: 鹿心社; pinyin: Lù Xīnshè; born November 1956) is a Chinese politician who served as Party Secretary of Guangxi Zhuang Autonomous Region from 2018 to 2021. Prior to becoming Guangxi party chief, he was Governor of Jiangxi from 2011 to 2016, and Party Secretary of Jiangxi from 2016 to 2018.

== Career ==
Lu Xinshe was born in Juye County, Shandong province. After the Cultural Revolution, he attended the Wuhan Hydraulics and Power College (now folded into Wuhan University). In 1982, he worked for the national ministry of agriculture and fisheries. He joined the Chinese Communist Party in July 1985. From 1986 to 1996 he worked for the State Administration of National Land (later Ministry of Land and Resources). He was sent to study in West Germany from 1987 to 1988, and temporarily took the post of vice mayor of Nantong, Jiangsu from 1995 to 1996. From 1999 until 2011 he was a Deputy Minister of Land and Resources.

In June 2011 he was transferred to Jiangxi province to become its acting governor, and was officially elected as governor in February 2012. On June 29, 2016, he replaced Qiang Wei as Party Secretary of Jiangxi. On March 21, 2018, Lu was appointed the Communist Party Secretary of Guangxi, replacing Peng Qinghua.

Lu Xinshe was an alternate of the 17th Central Committee and is a full member of the 18th Central Committee of the Chinese Communist Party.

On 23 October 2021, he was appointed vice chairperson of the National People's Congress Agriculture and Rural Affairs Committee.

Government offices
Preceded by Chen Bangzhu	Director of State Bureau of Surveying and Mapping; 2005–2008	Succeeded by Xu Deming
Preceded by Wu Xinxiong	Governor of Jiangxi; 2011–2016	Succeeded by Liu Qi
Party political offices
Preceded by Liu Weiping	Deputy Party Secretary of Gansu; 2010–2011	Succeeded by Ouyang Jian
Preceded by Qiang Wei	Party Secretary of Jiangxi; 2016–2018	Succeeded by Liu Qi
Preceded by Peng Qinghua	Party Secretary of Guangxi; 2018–	Succeeded by Liu Ning
Assembly seats
Preceded by Qiang Wei	Chairman of Jiangxi People's Congress; 2017–2018	Succeeded by Liu Qi
Preceded by Peng Qinghua	Chairman of Guangxi People's Congress; 2019–2022	Succeeded by Liu Ning
