= Wan Shaofen =

Chinese politician (1930–2026)

- 万绍芬
- Wan in 2010

Party Secretary of Jiangxi
- In office June 1985 – June 1988
- Preceded by: Bai Dongcai
- Succeeded by: Mao Zhiyong

Personal details
- Born: August 1930 Nanchang, Jiangxi, Republic of China
- Died: 25 June 2026 (aged 95) Beijing, China
- Party: Chinese Communist Party
- Education: National Chung Cheng University
- Profession: Politician

Wan Shaofen (Chinese: 万绍芬; pinyin: Wàn Shàofēn; August 1930 – 25 June 2026) was a Chinese politician who served as Party Secretary of Jiangxi from 1985 to 1988, the first female provincial-level party chief of the People's Republic of China. Her career was closely tied to that of Hu Yaobang. She was persecuted during the Cultural Revolution because of her association with Hu, rose to prominence after he became General Secretary of the Chinese Communist Party in 1982, and lost her position as party chief of Jiangxi after Hu's downfall in 1987. She later served as a deputy head of the United Front Work Department and as a member of the Standing Committee of the National People's Congress.

== Early life and education ==
Wan was born in August 1930 in a village near Nanchang, the capital of Jiangxi Province. Her parents were primary school teachers, and she is said to have descended from a Song dynasty defense minister.

She studied economics at National Chung Cheng University (now Nanchang University), where she participated in underground communist activities in 1948. According to her official obituary, she studied in the university's economics department in 1948 and 1949, joined a peripheral organisation of the underground Chinese Communist Party (CCP) and took part in the student movement. She began revolutionary work in May 1949, and helped the military control commission take over the university after the communist victory. She formally joined the CCP in July 1952, after the founding of the People's Republic of China in 1949.

== Politcal career ==
=== Youth League and Cultural Revolution ===
Wan became a local leader in the Communist Youth League of China (CYL) and the official trade union. Between 1950 and 1966, she served as secretary of the Nanchang municipal committee of the New Democratic Youth League, as it was then known, as a member of the league's Shaanxi provincial committee and as an alternate member of its Central Committee. Besides Nanchang, she also worked in Shaanxi Province under the CYL leader Hu Yaobang, whom she befriended.

During the Cultural Revolution, she was persecuted for her association with Hu Yaobang, and was incarcerated and physically abused. She was denounced as a capitalist roader and a follower of the fallen leaders Liu Shaoqi, Deng Xiaoping, and Hu. She was politically rehabilitated in 1974 and returned to work in Jiangxi. Her official obituary states that from 1970 she served as deputy director and party group member of the Jiangxi Provincial Labour Bureau. She was also deputy director of the provincial office for educated youth and chair and party group secretary of the Jiangxi Women's Federation, and she was a member of the executive committee of the All-China Women's Federation.

=== Party Secretary of Jiangxi ===
After Deng Xiaoping took power and began the reform and opening up era, Wan gained prominence thanks to her friendship with Hu, who became General Secretary of the Chinese Communist Party in 1982. She rose through the ranks in Jiangxi, working in labour and women's affairs. In 1984, she became head of the Jiangxi CCP Organization Department and a member of the Provincial Party Standing Committee. On 16 June 1985, she was elected by the Jiangxi Party Congress as the Provincial Party Committee Secretary. The election took place at the 8th Jiangxi Provincial Party Congress. She gained attention worldwide as the first woman to hold a top provincial leadership position in the PRC. On taking office, she said that she had to be worthy of the people of Jiangxi and of the women of the whole country. She was a member of the 12th and 13th Central Committees of the CCP.

During her tenure, Wan personally headed the province's committee for the development of the old revolutionary base areas, and sent more than 12,000 cadres there in work teams. She regarded the Jiujiang Yangtze River Bridge as a lifeline for Jiangxi's economy, and visited Vice Premier Wan Li at his home in Beijing to press for the resumption of its construction, which the State Council approved in 1987. She was credited in her three years in office with annual growth in provincial revenue of 20 to 30 per cent, and with the start of more than 2,000 construction projects in the old base areas, including more than 2,000 kilometres of roads. In November 1985, she wrote an article in the People's Daily urging the promotion of literature and art.

Wan did not complete her term as Party Chief of Jiangxi, mainly because Hu Yaobang was purged in January 1987. In June 1988, she left her posts in Jiangxi and became briefly a vice chairman of the All-China Federation of Trade Unions and deputy secretary of its party group, maintaining her provincial rank.

=== Later career ===
In December 1988, Wan was appointed deputy head of the United Front Work Department, in charge of Hong Kong, Macao and Taiwan affairs, and served in that position until September 1995. From 1993 to 1995, she was a member of the Preliminary Working Committee of the Preparatory Committee for the Hong Kong Special Administrative Region. She was a member of the 14th Central Commission for Discipline Inspection, and a deputy to the 6th, 7th, 8th and 9th National People's Congresses. Starting in 1993, she also served two terms as a member of the National People's Congress Standing Committee. In 1993, she became a vice chair of the NPC Overseas Chinese Affairs Committee. In 1998, she was named deputy chair of the National People's Congress Internal and Judicial Affairs Committee. She received more than 600 visiting delegations and travelled to dozens of countries and regions in her work for the United Front Work Department and the NPC. She retired in April 2004.

She was the honorary president of the China Charity Federation. During the 1998 China floods, she led a delegation that delivered relief funds and goods worth 76.6 million yuan to nine counties in Jiangxi. She also helped to fund more than ten projects in the province, including school buildings, a science museum and a library, and set up scholarship and aid funds there.

== Legacy ==
Wan was best known as the first female provincial party chief in China. For about 20 years after Wan's tenure, no female chief took the office until Sun Chunlan took on the top provincial office, of Fujian, in 2009. However, Wan's background in the youth league, the trade union, and women's work was not well suited for running a provincial economy in the reform era. During her tenure, the economic growth of Jiangxi lagged behind neighbouring provinces, especially the coastal provinces of Zhejiang, Fujian, and Guangdong.

On the other hand, Wan made great contributions to women's work in her home province. She implemented major policies to improve the life of women, set up schools to train female cadres, organized public lectures to raise women's awareness of their rights, and drafted regulations protecting women and children. In 1984, the All-China Women's Federation issued an unprecedented circular calling for other women cadres to learn from Wan's leadership. To commemorate the 60th anniversary of the founding of the People's Republic of China in 2009, the China Post issued a postage stamp honoring her as part of its 'Heroines' collection.

== Personal life and death ==
After her divorce in the late 1960s, Wan raised her daughter as a single mother. She died in Beijing from natural causes on 25 June 2026, aged 95.
