= Bai Dongcai =

Chinese politician

Party Secretary of Jiangxi
- In office 1982 – June 1985
- Preceded by: Jiang Weiqing
- Succeeded by: Wan Shaofen

Governor of Jiangxi
- In office December 1979 – August 1982
- Preceded by: Jiang Weiqing
- Succeeded by: Zhao Zengyi

Personal details
- Born: January 3, 1916 Qingjian County, Shaanxi, China
- Died: April 1, 2014 (aged 98)
- Party: Chinese Communist Party

Bai Dongcai (simplified Chinese: 白栋才; traditional Chinese: 白棟材; January 3, 1916 – April 1, 2014) was a People's Republic of China politician. He was born in Qingjian County, Shaanxi Province. He was a relative of Bai Rubing, Chinese Communist Party Committee Secretary and governor of Shandong Province and Bai Enpei, CCP Committee Secretary and governor of Qinghai Province and CCP Committee Secretary of Yunnan Province. He was a member of the 12th Central Committee of the Chinese Communist Party.

Preceded by Jiang Weiqing	Party Secretary of Jiangxi; 1982–1985	Succeeded by Wan Shaofen
Preceded by Jiang Weiqing	Governor of Jiangxi; 1979	Succeeded by Zhao Zengyi
