= Mao Zhiyong =

Chinese politician (1929–2019)

Mao Zhiyong (Chinese: 毛致用; November 1929 – 4 March 2019) was a People's Republic of China politician. He was born in Yueyang, Hunan. He was Chinese Communist Party Committee Secretary (1977–1988), governor (1977–1979) and Chinese People's Political Consultative Conference Committee Chairman (1977–1979) of his home province. He was Chinese Communist Party Committee Secretary of Jiangxi (1988–1995).

Military offices
| Preceded by Hua Guofeng | Political commissar of the PLA Hunan Military District; 1977–1983 | Succeeded by Gu Shanqing |
Party political offices
| Preceded by Hua Guofeng | Party Secretary of Hunan; 1977–1988 | Succeeded by Xiong Qingquan |
| Preceded by Wan Shaofen | Party Secretary of Jiangxi; 1988–1995 | Succeeded by Wu Guanzheng |
Government offices
| Preceded by Hua Guofeng | Governor of Hunan; 1977–1979 | Succeeded by Sun Guozhi |
Assembly seats
| Preceded by Zhang Pinghua | CPPCC Committee Chairman of Hunan; 1977–1979 | Succeeded by Zhou Li |
