= Huang Yuejin =

- 黄跃金

Chairmen of CPPCC Jiangxi Committee
- In office 13 June 2012 – January 2018
- Premier: Li Keqiang
- Preceded by: Zhang Yijiong
- Succeeded by: Yao Zengke

Personal details
- Born: 19 April 1953 (age 73) Liaoning, China
- Party: Chinese Communist Party
- Education: Tongji University

Huang Yuejin (Chinese: 黄跃金; pinyin: Huáng Yuèjīn; born April 1953) is a prominent member of the Chinese Communist Party from Fengcheng, Liaoning. He has a bachelor's degree in Construction Materials from Tongji University.

Huang has held various positions within the Shanghai Party Branch, such as being the former deputy secretary and mayor of the Hongkou District. He was also the deputy secretary general of the Shanghai Municipal Government (zh), under the Municipal Construction Committee and was the former city's Vice Chairman. Following his appointment into the CCP Shanghai Municipal Committee (zh) in May 2002, he was appointed as the Deputy Minister of the Central United Front Work Department in September 2003. On 24 May 2012, Huang was transferred to Jiangxi Province as the CPPCC party secretary; and on 13 June during the 6th plenary session of the 10th CPPCC Jiangxi Provincial Committee, he was elected as the provincial CPPCC Chairman. It was in January 2018 when Huang was elected as a member of the 13th CPPCC National Committee.
