= Huang Zhiquan (politician, born 1942) =

Chinese politician (1942–2026)

Huang Zhiquan (Chinese: 黄智权; February 1942 – 22 July 2026) was a Chinese politician. He served as Governor of Jiangxi Province and was a member of the 16th Central Committee of the Chinese Communist Party.

== Life and career ==
Huang was born in Tongxiang, Zhejiang, China in February 1942. He graduated from Zhejiang Agricultural University (now part of Zhejiang University). Huang's political career was mainly in Jiangxi Provincial Government. He died in Nanchang on 22 July 2026, at the age of 84.

== Positions held ==
- 1984–1991, Deputy Director of the Jiangxi Provincial Planning Committee;
- 1984–1993, Director of the Jiangxi Provincial Planning Committee;
- 1991–1993, Assistant for the Governor of Jiangxi Province;
- 1993–1995 & 1998–2001, Vice-Governor of Jiangxi Province (alongside Hu Changqing and Wang Jun);
- 1995–1998 & 2001–2006, Deputy Secretary-in-General of Jiangxi Province;
- 1997–2002, Standing Member of the 15th Central Committee of the Chinese Communist Party;
- 2001–2006, Governor of Jiangxi Province;
- 2002–2007, Member of the 16th Central Committee of the Chinese Communist Party.
