= Chen Zhengren =

Chinese politician

Personal details
- Born: December 1907 Suichuan County, Jiangxi, Qing China
- Died: April 6, 1972 (aged 64) Beijing, China
- Party: Chinese Communist Party

Chen Zhengren (Chinese: 陳正人) (December 1907 – April 6, 1972), original name Chen Lin (Chinese: 陈林), was a People's Republic of China politician. He was born in Suichuan County, Jiangxi Province. He joined the Communist Youth League of China and the Chinese Communist Party in 1925. In September 1927 he planned an uprising in Wan'an County, Jiangxi Province and returned home in December 1927. In 1928, he went to Jinggangshan. In 1930, he was active in Anfu County, Jiangxi Province to coordinate activity in southern Jiangxi and western Fujian. In 1937, he went to Yan'an, where he was active in the border region of Shaanxi, Gansu and Ningxia. In 1946, he went to Jilin Province as part of the communist activities in Northeast China. After the creation of the People's Republic of China, he went back to his home province to be the 1st Chinese Communist Party Committee Secretary until 1952 when he moved to work in the Central Government.

Chen occupied a number of ministerial posts during the 1950s: 52-54 minister of Building and from 59-65 minister of Agricultural Machinery. He was a standing committee member of the 2nd and 3rd Chinese People's Political Consultative Conference as well as an alternate member of the 8th Central Committee (elected 1956).

Like many other Central Government leaders, Chen was persecuted during the Cultural Revolution and was dismissed from office in 1967.

Chen died in April 1972 Beijing. He suffered greatly during the Cultural Revolution but was posthumously re-habilitated in 1980.
