= Cheng Shiqing =

Chinese politician

Governor of Jiangxi
- Preceded by: Fang Zhichun
- Succeeded by: She Jide

Personal details
- Born: April 1918 Xin County, Henan, China
- Died: April 29, 2008 (aged 89–90) Nanchang, Jiangxi, China
- Party: Chinese Communist Party

Cheng Shiqing (Chinese: 程世清) (April 1918 – April 29, 2008) was a People's Liberation Army major general and People's Republic of China politician. He was born in Xin County, Henan Province. He was Chinese Communist Party Committee Secretary and governor of Jiangxi Province during the Cultural Revolution. Under Cheng's leadership the Jiangxi revolutionary committee exercised terror through struggle sessions; in one case a man accused of being a Kuomintang spy had his ear cut off and was left to bleed to death.

== See also ==
- Ruijin Massacre
