= Jiangxi Provincial Committee of the Chinese Communist Party =

Jiangxi Provincial Committee of the Chinese Communist Party 中国共产党江西省委员会

Overview
- Type: Highest decision-making organ when Jiangxi Provincial Congress is not in session.
- Elected by: Jiangxi Provincial Congress
- Length of term: Five years
- Term limits: None
- First convocation: January 1938; 87 years ago

Leadership
- Secretary: Yin Hong
- Executive organ: Standing Committee
- Inspection organ: Commission for Discipline Inspection

Meeting place
- Jiangxi Provincial Committee Building in Nanchang

Jiangxi Provincial Committee of the Chinese Communist Party
- Simplified Chinese: 中国共产党江西省委员会
- Traditional Chinese: 中國共產黨江西省委員會
Transcriptions
Standard Mandarin
- Hanyu Pinyin: Zhōngguó Gòngchǎndǎng Jiāngxīshěng Wěiyuánhuì

Abbreviation
- Chinese: 中共江西省委
- Literal meaning: CCP Jiangxi Provincial Committee
Transcriptions
Standard Mandarin
- Hanyu Pinyin: Zhōnggòng Jiāngxīshěng Wěi

The Jiangxi Provincial Committee of the Chinese Communist Party is the provincial committee of the Chinese Communist Party (CCP) in Jiangxi, China, and the province's top authority. The committee secretary is the highest ranking post in the province.

== Organizations ==
The organization of the Jiangxi Provincial Committee includes:

- General Office

=== Functional Departments ===
- Organization Department
- Publicity Department
- United Front Work Department
- Political and Legal Affairs Commission
- Social Work Department
- Commission for Discipline Inspection
- Supervisory Commission

=== Offices ===
- Policy Research Office
- Office of the Cyberspace Affairs Commission
- Office of the Foreign Affairs Commission
- Office of the Deepening Reform Commission
- Office of the Institutional Organization Commission
- Office of the Military-civilian Fusion Development Committee
- Taiwan Work Office
- Office of the Leading Group for Inspection Work
- Bureau of Veteran Cadres

=== Dispatched institutions ===
- Working Committee of the Organs Directly Affiliated to the Jiangxi Provincial Committee

=== Organizations directly under the Committee ===
- Jiangxi Party School
- Jiangxi Daily Newspaper Group
- Jiangxi Institute of Socialism
- Party History Research Office
- Jiangxi Provincial Archives
- Lecturer Group

=== Organization managed by the work organization ===
- Confidential Bureau

== Leadership ==
=== Heads of the Organization Department ===
Name (English)	Name (Chinese)	Tenure begins	Tenure ends	Note
Zhuang Zhaolin	庄兆林	February 2024		

=== Heads of the Publicity Department ===
Name (English)	Name (Chinese)	Tenure begins	Tenure ends	Note
Zhuang Zhaolin	庄兆林	December 2021	February 2024	
Lu Xiaoqing	卢小青	April 2024		

=== Secretaries of the Political and Legal Affairs Commission ===
Name (English)	Name (Chinese)	Tenure begins	Tenure ends	Note
Luo Xiaoyun	罗小云	July 2022		

=== Heads of the United Front Work Department ===
Name (English)	Name (Chinese)	Tenure begins	Tenure ends	Note
Huang Xizhong	黄喜忠	December 2021		

== See also ==
- Politics of Jiangxi
