= Deputy Secretary-General of the State Council =

Governmental position in China

The office of Deputy Secretary-General of the State Council (Chinese: 国务院副秘书长) functions as the deputy to the Secretary-General. Currently, seven people serve as deputy secretary-general. The Deputy Secretary-General can hold concurrent positions. In general the Deputy Secretary-General has equivalent administrative rank as a vice minister of the state, though occasionally some Deputy Secretaries General will hold the rank of a minister.

Historically, the Deputy Secretary-General has been a powerful position. Its title holders are often involved in the day-to-day management of government and has direct access to the state council's most important officeholders, including the Premier and Vice-Premiers. Many Deputy Secretaries-General are later promoted to higher positions such as leading a ministry or a province. Ma Kai and Wang Yang eventually ascended to become Vice-Premier.

== List of officeholders ==
Name (birth–death)	Chinese characters	Took office	Left office	Tenure	Notes	Ref.
Qi Yanming (1907–1978)	齐燕铭	1 November 1954	March 1965	10 years, 120 days		
Tao Xijin (1908–1992)	陶希晋	1 November 1954	August 1959	4 years, 273 days		
Chang Lifu (1912–2006)	常黎夫	1 November 1954	February 1959	4 years, 92 days		
Zhang Ce (1911–1999)	张策	1 November 1954	April 1958	3 years, 151 days		
Gong Zirong (1914–1995)	龚子荣	1 November 1954	March 1965	10 years, 120 days		
Zeng Yifan (1907–1967)	曾一凡	1 November 1954	March 1965	10 years, 120 days		
Yang Fangzhi (1908–2003)	杨放之	1 November 1954	May 1966	11 years, 181 days		
Zhao Shougong (1912–1979)	赵守攻	August 1958	February 1965	6 years, 184 days		
Yang Dongchun (1900–1979)	杨东莼	August 1959	May 1966	6 years, 273 days		
Tong Xiaopeng (1914–2007)	童小鹏	August 1959	May 1966	6 years, 273 days		
Feng Xuan (1915–1986)	冯铉	August 1959	March 1965	5 years, 212 days		
Gao Dengbang (1914–1993)	高登榜	August 1959	May 1966	6 years, 273 days		
Lu Yuwen (1900–1968)	卢郁文	August 1959	March 1965	6 years, 273 days		
Zhou Rongxin (1917–1976)	周荣鑫	October 1963	January 1965	1 year, 92 days		
Zhao Pengfei (1920–2005)	赵鹏飞	October 1963	May 1966	2 years, 212 days		
Luo Qingchang (1918–2014)	罗青长	March 1965	May 1966	1 year, 61 days		
Xu Ming (1919–1966)	许明	March 1965	May 1966	1 year, 61 days		
Zheng Siyuan (1914–2017)	郑思远	March 1965	May 1966	1 year, 61 days	Purged during Cultural Revolution	
Vacant during 4th National People's Congress (1975-March 1979)
Wu Qingtong (1924–2016)	吴庆彤	March 1979	November 1985	6 years, 245 days		
Zheng Siyuan (1914–2017)	郑思远	March 1979	January 1983	6 years, 245 days	(Second term)	
Feng Jiping (1911–1983)	冯基平	July 1979	April 1981	2 years, 31 days		
Li Liyin (1918–2010)	李力殷	July 1979	August 1983	4 years, 153 days		
Du Xingyuan (1914–2011)	杜星垣	April 1980	March 1981	334 days		
Song Yiping (1917–2005)	宋一平	May 1980	August 1983	3 years, 92 days		
Chen Chu (1917–1999)	陈楚	September 1980	December 1984	3 years, 122 days		
Mao Lianjue (1922–1985)	毛联珏	September 1980	February 1982	1 year, 276 days		
Yuan Jinxiu (1922–1985)	袁晋修	September 1980	27 March 1983	2 years, 207 days		
Wang Fulin (c. 1924–2003)	王伏林	September 1980	August 1983	2 years, 334 days		
Tian Jiyun (born 1929)	田纪云	March 1981	20 June 1983	2 years, 111 days	Later became Vice-Premier	
Liu Zhihan (1914–2014)	刘志汉	May 1981	August 1983	2 years, 92 days		
Gu Ming (1919–2008)	顾明	August 1981	January 1985	1 year, 212 days		
Ma Hong (1920–2007)	马洪	April 1982	August 1983	1 year, 122 days		
Zhou Shaozheng (1926–2007)	周绍铮	May 1982	August 1983	1 year, 92 days		
Li Hao (born 1926)	李灏	August 1983	August 1985	2 years, 0 days		
Ai Zhisheng (1928–1997)	艾知生	August 1983	April 1985	1 year, 243 days		
Zhang Wenshou (1926–2009)	张文寿	December 1984	3 May 1988	3 years, 154 days		
Zhang Jingyuan (born ?)	张镜源	December 1984	February 1986	1 year, 62 days		
Liu Suinian (1929–2002)	柳随年	August 1985	January 1986	212 days		
Yan Ying (born 1957)	阎颖	August 1985	July 1990	4 years, 334 days		
Wang Shuming (1933–2013)	王书明	November 1985	June 1993	7 years, 212 days		
Bai Meiqing (born 1931)	白美清	December 1985	July 1990	4 years, 212 days		
Li Chang'an (born 1935)	李昌安	12 June 1987	July 1993	6 years, 19 days		
Chang Jie (born 1929)	常捷	July 1987	November 1990	3 years, 123 days		
He Chunlin (born 1933)	何椿霖	3 May 1988	March 1998	9 years, 302 days		
Liu Zhongde (1933–2012)	刘忠德	3 May 1988	July 1990	2 years, 59 days	Later became Minister of Culture	
Li Shizhong (born ?)	李世忠	3 May 1988	February 1995	6 years, 274 days		
Xi Dehua (1933–2013)	席德华	3 May 1988	May 1995	6 years, 363 days		
An Chengxin (1939–2012)	安成信	3 May 1988	May 1993	4 years, 363 days		
Liu Zhongli (born 1934)	刘仲藜	July 1990	4 September 1992	2 years, 65 days	Later became Minister of Finance	
Xu Zhijian (born 1935)	徐志坚	July 1990	10 December 1996	6 years, 162 days		
Liu Jimin (born 1938)	刘济民	June 1993	March 1998	4 years, 273 days		
Li Shuwen (born 1940)	李树文	July 1993	March 1998	4 years, 243 days		
Zhang Kezhi (1941–2004)	张克智	July 1993	March 1998	4 years, 243 days		
Liu Qibao (born 1953)	刘奇葆	July 1994	March 1998	3 years, 243 days	Later became Head of the Propaganda Department of the Communist Party	
Zhang Zuoji (1945–2021)	张左己	November 1994	18 March 1998	3 years, 137 days	Later became Governor of Heilongjiang province	
Jin Renqing (born 1944)	金人庆	May 1995	November 1995	184 days	Later became Minister of Finance	
Yang Jingyu (born 1936)	杨景宇	May 1995	March 1998	2 years, 304 days		
Zhou Zhengqing (born 1935)	周正庆	June 1995	March 1998	2 years, 273 days		
Shi Xiushi (born 1942)	石秀诗	September 1996	December 2000	4 years, 132 days		
Cui Zhanfu (born 1942)	崔占福	September 1996	January 2003	6 years, 137 days		
Ma Kai (born 1946)	马凯	March 1998	March 2003	4 years, 306 days	Later became Vice-Premier	
Xu Rongkai (born 1942)	徐荣凯	March 1998	June 2001	3 years, 92 days		
Xu Shaoshi (born 1951)	徐绍史	9 January 2001	April 2007	6 years, 104 days	Later became Chairman of the National Development and Reform Commission	
You Quan (born 1954)	尤权	January 2001	December 2006	5 years, 355 days	Later became party chief of Fujian province	
Gao Qiang (born 1944)	高强	July 2001	April 2003	1 year, 304 days	Later became Minister of Health	
Jiao Huancheng (born 1949)	焦焕成	July 2002	October 2015	13 years, 109 days	Director of the General Administration for State Organs	
Wang Yang (born 1955)	汪洋	March 2003	5 January 2006	2 years, 310 days	Later became Vice-Premier	
Chen Jinyu (born 1946)	陈进玉	1 May 2003	30 December 2006	3 years, 243 days		
Li Shishi (born 1953)	李适时	31 December 2003	28 February 2008	4 years, 59 days		
Zhang Yong (born 1953)	张勇	31 December 2003	April 2015	9 years, 60 days		
Zhang Ping (born 1946)	张平	5 January 2006	18 March 2008	2 years, 73 days	Later became Chairman of the National Development and Reform Commission	
Xiang Zhaolun (born 1959)	项兆伦	30 December 2006	April 2013	6 years, 92 days	Chief of the Office of the Premier	
Lou Jiwei (born 1950)	楼继伟	March 2007	September 2007	214 days	Later became Minister of Finance	
Wang Yongqing (born 1959)	汪永清	14 March 2008	3 April 2018	18 years, 166 days		
You Quan (born 1954)	尤权	18 March 2008	18 December 2012	3 years, 89 days	(second term)	
Wang Yong (born 1955)	王勇	18 March 2008	21 September 2008	187 days	Later became Chairman of the State-owned Assets Supervision and Administration Commission	
Qiu Xiaoxiong (born 1955)	丘小雄	18 March 2008	15 June 2011	3 years, 89 days		
Bi Jingquan (born 1955)	毕井泉	18 March 2008	April 2015	6 years, 315 days		
Wang Xuejun (born 1952)	王学军	27 July 2008	March 2013	4 years, 217 days	Later became governor, then party chief of Anhui province	
Xiao Yaqing (born 1959)	肖亚庆	16 February 2009	February 2016	6 years, 350 days	Chief of Staff to Vice-Premier Ma Kai	
Ding Xuedong (born 1960)	丁学东	June 2010	23 July 2013	3 years, 52 days	Chief of staff to Vice-Premier Hui Liangyu; Later became chairman and CEO of the China Investment Corporation	
Jiang Xiaojuan (born 1957)	江小涓	15 June 2011	22 June 2018	9 years, 105 days	Chief of staff to Vice-Premier Liu Yandong	
Xiao Jie (born 1957)	肖捷	March 2013	November 2016	3 years, 237 days	Executive Deputy Secretary-General (minister-level); Chief of staff to Premier Li Keqiang; Later became Minister of Finance	
Ding Xiangyang (born 1959)	丁向阳	March 2013	8 April 2021	13 years, 165 days	Chief of staff to Vice-Premier Zhang Gaoli, then to Vice-Premier Han Zheng	
Shu Xiaoqin (born 1959)	舒晓琴	April 2013	10 April 2020	13 years, 165 days	Director of the Bureau of Letters and Calls	
Wang zhongwei (born 1955)	王仲伟	April 2013	September 2015			
Jiang Zelin (born 1959)	江泽林	April 2015	February 2018	2 years, 283 days	Chief of staff to Vice-Premier Wang Yang	
Meng Yang (born ?)	孟杨	May 2015	Incumbent	11 years, 106 days	Director of the First Secretarial Department	
Peng Shujie (born 1963)	彭树杰	December 2015	4 July 2023	7 years, 208 days		
Ding Xuedong (born 1960)	丁学东	March 2017	4 July 2023	6 years, 95 days	(Second term); Executive Deputy Secretary-General (minister-level) since May 2018; Chief of staff to Executive Vice Premier Han Zheng, then to Executive Vice Premier Ding Xuexiang	
Li Baorong (born 1958)	李宝荣	April 2017	June 2022	9 years, 148 days		
Xiao Jie (born 1957)	肖捷	2 November 2017	19 March 2018	137 days	(Second term)	
Lu Junhua (born 1962)	陆俊华	June 2018	19 August 2021	8 years, 66 days		
Gao Yu [zh] (born 1961)	高雨	10 October 2019	30 November 2021	2 years, 51 days		
Li Wenzhang (born 1962)	李文章	10 April 2020	4 July 2023	3 years, 85 days	Also the director of National Public Complaints and Proposals Administration	
Liu Jianbo (birth year unclear)	刘建波	20 May 2021	Incumbent	5 years, 99 days		
Guo Wei (birth year unclear)	郭玮	22 July 2021	Incumbent	5 years, 36 days		
Wang Zhiqing (born 1966)	王志清	30 November 2021	Incumbent	4 years, 270 days		
Wang Zhijun (born 1965)	王志军	4 July 2023	Incumbent	3 years, 54 days	Executive Deputy Secretary-General (minister-level); Chief of staff to Executive Vice Premier Ding Xuexiang	
Wang Yonghong (born 1969)	王永红	4 July 2023	Incumbent	3 years, 54 days	Also the director of National Government Offices Administration	
Xu Shouben (born 1969)	徐守本	30 August 2023	Incumbent	2 years, 362 days		
