= Hu–Wen Administration =

2002–2013 Chinese administration of Hu Jintao and Wen Jiabao

Hu–Wen Administration 胡温体制
- 4th generation Communist leadership of the People's Republic of China

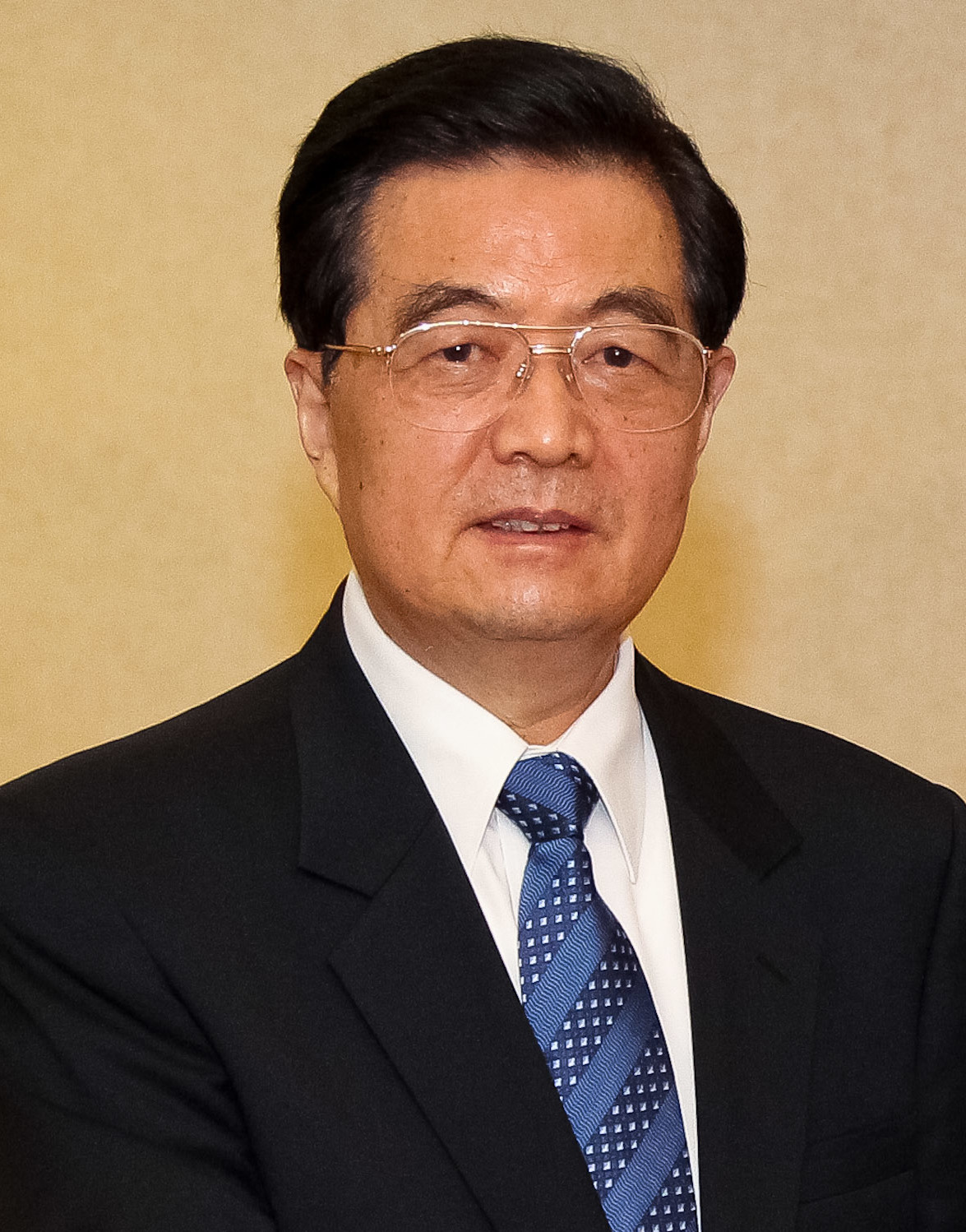
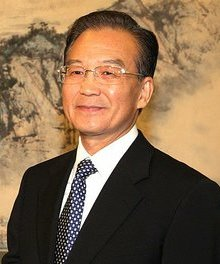
- Hu Jintao (left) and Wen Jiabao (right)
- Date formed: 15 November 2002
- Date dissolved: 15 March 2013

People and organisations
- Paramount leader (Note: "Paramount leader" is not a formal title; the top position held by Hu Jintao was General Secretary of the Chinese Communist Party, thus the officeholder holds ultimate power and authority over party and state.): Hu Jintao
- President: Hu Jintao
- Premier: Wen Jiabao
- Member party: Chinese Communist Party; Eight minor parties

History
- Elections: 5–18 March 2003; 5–18 March 2008
- Legislature terms: 10th National People's Congress; 11th National People's Congress
- Predecessor: Jiang–Li–Zhu Administration
- Successor: Xi–Li Administration

The Hu–Wen Administration (Note: Chinese: 胡温体制; pinyin: Hú-Wēn Tǐzhì) was the Chinese leadership of general secretary of the Chinese Communist Party (CCP) and Chinese president Hu Jintao, and Chinese premier Wen Jiabao. Hu and Wen officially succeeded Jiang Zemin, Li Peng and Zhu Rongji in 2002. Using the two leaders' surnames, it is abbreviated as Hu–Wen. (Note: Chinese: 胡温)

Hu and Wen are considered the fourth generation Chinese leaders and are viewed as, at least ostensibly, more reform-oriented and more open-minded. Hu's contributions to the CCP ideology are officially termed the Scientific Outlook on Development.

== CCP Politburo Standing Committee ==
=== 16th PSC ===
Portrait	Information		Other party position(s)	State position(s)
Hu Jintao	Rank	1st	General Secretary of the CCP Central Committee; Chairman of the CCP Central Military Commission	President of the People's Republic of China; Chairman of the PRC Central Military Commission
Hu Jintao	Name	Hu Jintao	General Secretary of the CCP Central Committee; Chairman of the CCP Central Military Commission	President of the People's Republic of China; Chairman of the PRC Central Military Commission
Hu Jintao	Birthplace	Jiangyan, Taizhou, Jiangsu	General Secretary of the CCP Central Committee; Chairman of the CCP Central Military Commission	President of the People's Republic of China; Chairman of the PRC Central Military Commission
Hu Jintao	NPC Constituency	Zhejiang At-large	General Secretary of the CCP Central Committee; Chairman of the CCP Central Military Commission	President of the People's Republic of China; Chairman of the PRC Central Military Commission
Wu Bangguo	Rank	2nd	Party secretary of the Standing Committee of the National People's Congress	Chairman of the Standing Committee of the National People's Congress
Wu Bangguo	Name	Wu Bangguo	Party secretary of the Standing Committee of the National People's Congress	Chairman of the Standing Committee of the National People's Congress
Wu Bangguo	Birthplace	Feidong County, Hefei, Anhui	Party secretary of the Standing Committee of the National People's Congress	Chairman of the Standing Committee of the National People's Congress
Wu Bangguo	NPC Constituency	Anhui At-large	Party secretary of the Standing Committee of the National People's Congress	Chairman of the Standing Committee of the National People's Congress
Wen Jiabao	Rank	3rd	Party secretary of the State Council of the People's Republic of China	Premier of the State Council of the People's Republic of China
Wen Jiabao	Name	Wen Jiabao	Party secretary of the State Council of the People's Republic of China	Premier of the State Council of the People's Republic of China
Wen Jiabao	Birthplace	Beichen District, Tianjin	Party secretary of the State Council of the People's Republic of China	Premier of the State Council of the People's Republic of China
Wen Jiabao	NPC Constituency	Gansu At-large	Party secretary of the State Council of the People's Republic of China	Premier of the State Council of the People's Republic of China
Jia Qinglin	Rank	4th	Party secretary of the National Committee of the Chinese People's Political Consultative Conference	Chairman of the National Committee of the Chinese People's Political Consultative Conference
Jia Qinglin	Name	Jia Qinglin	Party secretary of the National Committee of the Chinese People's Political Consultative Conference	Chairman of the National Committee of the Chinese People's Political Consultative Conference
Jia Qinglin	Birthplace	Botou, Cangzhou, Hebei	Party secretary of the National Committee of the Chinese People's Political Consultative Conference	Chairman of the National Committee of the Chinese People's Political Consultative Conference
Jia Qinglin	NPC Constituency	Beijing At-large	Party secretary of the National Committee of the Chinese People's Political Consultative Conference	Chairman of the National Committee of the Chinese People's Political Consultative Conference
	Rank	5th	Top-ranked Secretary of the Central Secretariat of the CPC; President of the Central Party School of the CPC	Vice President of the People's Republic of China
	Name	Zeng Qinghong	Top-ranked Secretary of the Central Secretariat of the CPC; President of the Central Party School of the CPC	Vice President of the People's Republic of China
	Birthplace	Ji'an, Jiangxi	Top-ranked Secretary of the Central Secretariat of the CPC; President of the Central Party School of the CPC	Vice President of the People's Republic of China
	NPC Constituency	Jiangxi At-large	Top-ranked Secretary of the Central Secretariat of the CPC; President of the Central Party School of the CPC	Vice President of the People's Republic of China
Huang Ju	Rank	6th	Deputy Party secretary of the State Council of the People's Republic of China	First-ranked Vice Premier of the State Council of the People's Republic of China
Huang Ju	Name	Huang Ju (died in office, June 2007)	Deputy Party secretary of the State Council of the People's Republic of China	First-ranked Vice Premier of the State Council of the People's Republic of China
Huang Ju	Birthplace	Jiashan County, Jiaxing, Zhejiang	Deputy Party secretary of the State Council of the People's Republic of China	First-ranked Vice Premier of the State Council of the People's Republic of China
Huang Ju	NPC Constituency	Shanghai At-large	Deputy Party secretary of the State Council of the People's Republic of China	First-ranked Vice Premier of the State Council of the People's Republic of China
Wu Guanzheng	Rank	7th	Secretary of the Central Commission for Discipline Inspection	
Wu Guanzheng	Name	Wu Guanzheng	Secretary of the Central Commission for Discipline Inspection	
Wu Guanzheng	Birthplace	Yugan County, Shangrao, Jiangxi	Secretary of the Central Commission for Discipline Inspection	
Wu Guanzheng	NPC Constituency	Shandong At-large	Secretary of the Central Commission for Discipline Inspection	
Li Changchun	Rank	8th	Chairman of the Central Guidance Commission for Building Spiritual Civilization	
Li Changchun	Name	Li Changchun	Chairman of the Central Guidance Commission for Building Spiritual Civilization	
Li Changchun	Birthplace	Dalian, Liaoning	Chairman of the Central Guidance Commission for Building Spiritual Civilization	
Li Changchun	NPC Constituency	Sichuan At-large	Chairman of the Central Guidance Commission for Building Spiritual Civilization	
Zhou Yongkang	Rank	9th	Secretary of the Central Political and Legal Affairs Commission	
Zhou Yongkang	Name	Luo Gan	Secretary of the Central Political and Legal Affairs Commission	
Zhou Yongkang	Birthplace	Jinan, Shandong	Secretary of the Central Political and Legal Affairs Commission	
Zhou Yongkang	NPC Constituency	Fujian At-large	Secretary of the Central Political and Legal Affairs Commission	

=== 17th PSC ===
Portrait	Information		Other party position(s)	State position(s)
Hu Jintao	Rank	1st	General Secretary of the CCP Central Committee; Chairman of the CCP Central Military Commission	President of the People's Republic of China; Chairman of the PRC Central Military Commission
Hu Jintao	Name	Hu Jintao	General Secretary of the CCP Central Committee; Chairman of the CCP Central Military Commission	President of the People's Republic of China; Chairman of the PRC Central Military Commission
Hu Jintao	Birthplace	Jiangyan, Taizhou, Jiangsu	General Secretary of the CCP Central Committee; Chairman of the CCP Central Military Commission	President of the People's Republic of China; Chairman of the PRC Central Military Commission
Hu Jintao	NPC Constituency	Zhejiang At-large	General Secretary of the CCP Central Committee; Chairman of the CCP Central Military Commission	President of the People's Republic of China; Chairman of the PRC Central Military Commission
Wu Bangguo	Rank	2nd	Party secretary of the Standing Committee of the National People's Congress	Chairman of the Standing Committee of the National People's Congress
Wu Bangguo	Name	Wu Bangguo	Party secretary of the Standing Committee of the National People's Congress	Chairman of the Standing Committee of the National People's Congress
Wu Bangguo	Birthplace	Feidong County, Hefei, Anhui	Party secretary of the Standing Committee of the National People's Congress	Chairman of the Standing Committee of the National People's Congress
Wu Bangguo	NPC Constituency	Anhui At-large	Party secretary of the Standing Committee of the National People's Congress	Chairman of the Standing Committee of the National People's Congress
Wen Jiabao	Rank	3rd	Party secretary of the State Council of the People's Republic of China	Premier of the State Council of the People's Republic of China
Wen Jiabao	Name	Wen Jiabao	Party secretary of the State Council of the People's Republic of China	Premier of the State Council of the People's Republic of China
Wen Jiabao	Birthplace	Beichen District, Tianjin	Party secretary of the State Council of the People's Republic of China	Premier of the State Council of the People's Republic of China
Wen Jiabao	NPC Constituency	Gansu At-large	Party secretary of the State Council of the People's Republic of China	Premier of the State Council of the People's Republic of China
Jia Qinglin	Rank	4th	Party secretary of the National Committee of the Chinese People's Political Consultative Conference	Chairman of the National Committee of the Chinese People's Political Consultative Conference
Jia Qinglin	Name	Jia Qinglin	Party secretary of the National Committee of the Chinese People's Political Consultative Conference	Chairman of the National Committee of the Chinese People's Political Consultative Conference
Jia Qinglin	Birthplace	Botou, Cangzhou, Hebei	Party secretary of the National Committee of the Chinese People's Political Consultative Conference	Chairman of the National Committee of the Chinese People's Political Consultative Conference
Jia Qinglin	NPC Constituency	Beijing At-large	Party secretary of the National Committee of the Chinese People's Political Consultative Conference	Chairman of the National Committee of the Chinese People's Political Consultative Conference
Li Changchun	Rank	5th	Chairman of the Central Guidance Commission for Building Spiritual Civilization	
Li Changchun	Name	Li Changchun	Chairman of the Central Guidance Commission for Building Spiritual Civilization	
Li Changchun	Birthplace	Dalian, Liaoning	Chairman of the Central Guidance Commission for Building Spiritual Civilization	
Li Changchun	NPC Constituency	Sichuan At-large	Chairman of the Central Guidance Commission for Building Spiritual Civilization	
Xi Jinping	Rank	6th	Top-ranked Secretary of the Central Secretariat of the CPC; Vice Chairman of the CPC Central Military Commission; President of the Central Party School of the CPC	Vice President of the People's Republic of China; Vice Chairman of the PRC Central Military Commission
Xi Jinping	Name	Xi Jinping	Top-ranked Secretary of the Central Secretariat of the CPC; Vice Chairman of the CPC Central Military Commission; President of the Central Party School of the CPC	Vice President of the People's Republic of China; Vice Chairman of the PRC Central Military Commission
Xi Jinping	Birthplace	Xicheng District, Beijing	Top-ranked Secretary of the Central Secretariat of the CPC; Vice Chairman of the CPC Central Military Commission; President of the Central Party School of the CPC	Vice President of the People's Republic of China; Vice Chairman of the PRC Central Military Commission
Xi Jinping	NPC Constituency	Shanghai At-large	Top-ranked Secretary of the Central Secretariat of the CPC; Vice Chairman of the CPC Central Military Commission; President of the Central Party School of the CPC	Vice President of the People's Republic of China; Vice Chairman of the PRC Central Military Commission
	Rank	7th	Deputy Party secretary of the State Council of the People's Republic of China	First-ranked Vice Premier of the State Council of the People's Republic of China
	Name	Li Keqiang	Deputy Party secretary of the State Council of the People's Republic of China	First-ranked Vice Premier of the State Council of the People's Republic of China
	Birthplace	Dingyuan County, Chuzhou, Anhui	Deputy Party secretary of the State Council of the People's Republic of China	First-ranked Vice Premier of the State Council of the People's Republic of China
	NPC Constituency	Liaoning At-large	Deputy Party secretary of the State Council of the People's Republic of China	First-ranked Vice Premier of the State Council of the People's Republic of China
He Guoqiang	Rank	8th	Secretary of the Central Commission for Discipline Inspection	
He Guoqiang	Name	He Guoqiang	Secretary of the Central Commission for Discipline Inspection	
He Guoqiang	Birthplace	Xiangxiang, Xiangtan, Hunan	Secretary of the Central Commission for Discipline Inspection	
He Guoqiang	NPC Constituency	Hunan At-large	Secretary of the Central Commission for Discipline Inspection	
Zhou Yongkang	Rank	9th	Secretary of the Central Political and Legal Affairs Commission	
Zhou Yongkang	Name	Zhou Yongkang	Secretary of the Central Political and Legal Affairs Commission	
Zhou Yongkang	Birthplace	Wuxi, Jiangsu	Secretary of the Central Political and Legal Affairs Commission	
Zhou Yongkang	NPC Constituency	Heilongjiang At-large	Secretary of the Central Political and Legal Affairs Commission	

== The Presidency ==
Office	Officeholder(s)	Tenure
President	Hu Jintao	2003–2013
Vice President	Zeng Qinghong; Xi Jinping	2003–2008; 2008–2013

== Congress and Conference leaders ==
Office	Officeholder(s)	Tenure
Congress Chairman	Wu Bangguo	2003–2013
Conference Chairman	Jia Qinglin	2003–2013

== The State Council ==
Wen Cabinet I (Members of the 10th State Council) March 2003 – March 2008
Office		Officeholder(s)	Tenure
Premier		Wen Jiabao	2003–2008
Vice Premier(s)	(1st)	Huang Ju vacant	2003–2007; 2007–2008
Vice Premier(s)	(2nd)	Wu Yi	2003–2008
Vice Premier(s)	(3rd)	Zeng Peiyan	2003–2008
Vice Premier(s)	(4th)	Hui Liangyu	2003–2008
State Councilor(s)	(1st)	Chen Zhili	2003–2008
State Councilor(s)	(2nd)	Hua Jianmin*	2003–2008
State Councilor(s)	(3rd)	Cao Gangchuan*	2003–2008
State Councilor(s)	(4th)	Zhou Yongkang*	2003–2008
State Councilor(s)	(5th)	Tang Jiaxuan*	2003–2008
Secretary General		Hua Jianmin	2003–2008
Finance Minister		Jin Renqing; Xie Xuren	2003–2007; 2007–2008
Foreign Minister		Li Zhaoxing; Yang Jiechi	2003–2007; 2007–2008
Defense Minister		Cao Gangchuan; Liang Guanglie	2003–2007; 2007–2008
Education Minister		Zhou Ji	2003–2008
Commerce Minister		Bo Xilai; Chen Deming	2003–2007; 2007–2008
Health Minister		Zhang Wenkang; Wu Yi; Gao Qiang; Chen Zhu	1998–2003; 2003–2005; 2005–2007; 2007–2008
Development and Reform Commission Chairperson		Ma Kai	2003–2008
Railways Minister		Liu Zhijun	2003–2008
Civil Affairs Minister		Li Xueju	2003–2008
Labour Minister		Zheng Silin; Tian Chengping	2003–2005; 2005–2008
Central Bank Governor		Zhou Xiaochuan	2003–2008

Wen Cabinet II (Members of the 11th State Council) March 2008 – March 2013
Office		Officeholder(s)	Tenure
Premier		Wen Jiabao	2008–2013
Vice Premier(s)	(1st)	Li Keqiang	2008–2013
Vice Premier(s)	(2nd)	Hui Liangyu	2008–2013
Vice Premier(s)	(3rd)	Zhang Dejiang	2008–2013
Vice Premier(s)	(4th)	Wang Qishan	2008–2013
State Councilor(s)	(1st)	Liu Yandong	2008–2013
State Councilor(s)	(2nd)	Ma Kai*	2008–2013
State Councilor(s)	(3rd)	Liang Guanglie*	2008–2013
State Councilor(s)	(4th)	Meng Jianzhu*	2008–2013
State Councilor(s)	(5th)	Dai Bingguo	2008–2013
Secretary General		Ma Kai	2008–2013
Finance Minister		Xie Xuren	2008–2013
Foreign Minister		Yang Jiechi	2008–2013
Defense Minister		Liang Guanglie	2008–2013
Education Minister		Zhou Ji; Yuan Guiren	2008–2009; 2009-2013
Commerce Minister		Chen Deming	2008–2013
Health Minister		Chen Zhu	2008–2013
Development and Reform Commission Chairperson		Zhang Ping	2008–2013
Railways Minister		Liu Zhijun; Sheng Guangzu	2008–2011; 2011–2013
Civil Affairs Minister		Li Xueju	2008–2013
Labour Minister		Tian Chengping	2008–2013
Central Bank Governor		Zhou Xiaochuan	2008–2013

== See also ==
- Generations of Chinese leadership
  - Xi–Li Administration

Preceded by Jiang–Li–Zhu Administration	PRC leadership 4th generation	Succeeded by Xi–Li Administration
