= Ding Xuedong =

Chinese politician (born 1960)

- 丁学东
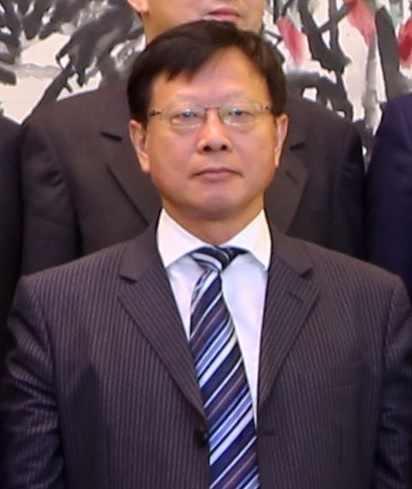
- Born: February 1960 (age 66)
- Education: PhD
- Occupation: State Council

Ding Xuedong (born February 1960) is a Chinese politician. He is the current Communist Party Secretary and Vice Chair of the National Council for Social Security Fund. Previously, he served as the Chairman & CEO of China Investment Corporation and the Executive Deputy Secretary-General of the State Council (minister-level).

== Education ==
Ding holds a Ph.D. in economics from the Research Institute for Fiscal Science, Ministry of Finance.

== Career ==
In his earlier career, Mr. Ding served as Director General of the Department of Property Rights and Director General of the Department of Human Resources & Head of the General Office, State-owned Asset Administration Bureau.

Subsequently, he held several positions in the Ministry of Finance, including Vice Minister, Assistant Minister, Director General of the Department of Education, Science and Culture, Director General of the Department of Agriculture and Director General of the Department of State-owned Capital Administration. Ding served as Deputy Secretary General of the State Council.

In July 2013, Ding was appointed as China Investment Corporation's chairman by the Communist Party. Ding oversaw a restructuring of CIC and an increased focus on internal discipline. He required senior executives and over 400 CIC employees to submit self-criticisms in which they detailed their errors, apologized, and pledged not to repeat those errors.

Under Ding's tenure, a CIC audit begun under predecessor Lou Jiwei was concluded. The audit found that CIC's early losses were primarily due to dereliction of duty by key personnel, inadequate due diligence, inadequate post-investment management, and a general lack of professionalism. Amid the nationwide anti-corruption campaign in 2015, CIC launched an internal investigation in which 495 personnel from CIC and its subsidiaries were disciplined.

CIC's investment strategy changed during Ding's tenure, with an increased focus on the agricultural sector, including industries such as irrigation and animal feed, which other institutional investors have tended to overlook. Other points of emphasis during Ding's time as CIC Chair included technology, real estate, and infrastructure investments.

The Communist Party viewed Ding's tenure at CIC as a success and in February 2017 promoted Ding to secretary general of the State Council.

Ding is also chairman of China International Capital Corporation, a leading Chinese investment bank in which China Investment Corporation indirectly holds over 40% interest.

Ding was a member of the 19th Central Committee of the Communist Party in 2017 and the 20th Central Committee of the Communist Party in 2022.

Government offices
Preceded by Xiao Jie	Executive Deputy Secretary-General of the State Council; 2018–2023	Succeeded by Wang Zhijun
Party political offices
Preceded by Wang Ercheng	Communist Party Secretary of the National Council for Social Security Fund; 2023–present	Incumbent
