= Wang Ercheng =

Chinese politician

- 王尔乘

Party Branch Secretary of the National Council for Social Security Fund
- In office July 2015 – November 2020
- Premier: Li Keqiang
- Head: Lou Jiwei; Liu Wei
- Preceded by: Dai Xianglong
- Succeeded by: Ding Xuedong

Personal details
- Born: October 1955 (age 70–71) Dandong, Liaoning, China
- Party: Chinese Communist Party
- Education: Beijing Normal University; China Europe International Business School

Chinese name
- Simplified Chinese: 王尔乘
- Traditional Chinese: 王爾乘
Transcriptions
Standard Mandarin
- Hanyu Pinyin: Wáng ěrchéng

Wang Ercheng (Chinese: 王尔乘; born October 1955) is a Chinese politician. He an alternate of the 19th Central Committee of the Chinese Communist Party. He was a member of the Standing Committee of the 12th National People's Congress. He was a member of the 13th National Committee of the Chinese People's Political Consultative Conference.

== Biography ==
Wang was born in Dandong, Liaoning, in October 1955. During the Cultural Revolution, he worked in Xizhimen Business Office of Beijing Timber Company between December 1971 and May 1981.

He joined the Chinese Communist Party in December 1980. In May 1981, he became an official in Beijing Municipal Materials Bureau, and rose to deputy sector chief one year later. In August 1985, he was assigned to the Organization Department of the CCP Central Committee, where he was promoted to director of its General Office in March 2000 and to vice minister in July 2007. He was appointed party branch secretary of the National Council for Social Security Fund in July 2015, concurrently serving as party member of the Ministry of Finance since March 2018.

In November 2020, he was made vice chairperson of the Social and Legal Affairs Committee of the National Committee of the Chinese People's Political Consultative Conference.

Party political offices
Preceded by Dai Xianglong	Party Branch Secretary of the National Council for Social Security Fund; 2015–2020	Succeeded by Ding Xuedong
