= Committee for Economic Affairs =

Special Committee of the CPPCC National Committee

- 中国人民政治协商会议全国委员会 经济委员会
- Formation: June 9, 1988; 38 years ago
- Type: Special committee of the CPPCC
- Location: Beijing
- Chairperson: Wang Guosheng
- Parent organization: National Committee of the Chinese People's Political Consultative Conference

Chinese name
- Simplified Chinese: 中国人民政治协商会议全国委员会经济委员会
- Traditional Chinese: 中國人民政治協商會議全國委員會經濟委員會
Transcriptions
Standard Mandarin
- Hanyu Pinyin: Zhōngguó Rénmín Zhèngzhì Xiéshāng Huìyì Quánguó Wěiyuánhuì Jīngjì Wěiyuánhuì

Shortest form
- Simplified Chinese: 全国政协经济委员会
- Traditional Chinese: 全國政協經濟委員會
Transcriptions
Standard Mandarin
- Hanyu Pinyin: Quánguó Zhèngxié Jīngjì Wěiyuánhuì

The Committee for Economic Affairs is one of ten special committees of the National Committee of the Chinese People's Political Consultative Conference, China's top political advisory body and a central part of the Chinese Communist Party's united front system.

== History ==
The Economic Affairs Committee was created in June 1988 during the 7th National Committee of the Chinese People's Political Consultative Conference.

== List of chairpersons ==
No.	Chairpersons	Took office	Left office	Notes
7th	Gu Mu	June 1988	21 May 1993	
8th	Fang Weizhong	21 May 1993	16 March 1998	
9th	Fang Weizhong	16 March 1998	15 March 2003	
10th	Liu Zhongli	15 March 2003	15 March 2008	
11th	Zhang Zuoji	15 March 2008	13 March 2013	
12th	Zhou Bohua	13 March 2013	16 March 2018	
13th	Shang Fulin	16 March 2018	13 March 2023	
14th	Wang Guosheng	13 March 2023	Incumbent	

== See also ==
- Financial and Economic Affairs Committee
