= Wang Jun (politician, born 1958) =

Chinese politician

- 王军

Head of the State Taxation Administration
- Incumbent
- Assumed office 20 March 2013
- Premier: Li Keqiang; Li Qiang
- Preceded by: Xiao Jie

Personal details
- Born: November 1958 (age 67) Shangqiu, Henan, China
- Party: Chinese Communist Party
- Education: Peking University

Chinese name
- Simplified Chinese: 王军
- Traditional Chinese: 王軍
Transcriptions
Standard Mandarin
- Hanyu Pinyin: Wáng Jūn

Wang Jun (Chinese: 王军; born November 1958) is a Chinese politician and the current head of the State Taxation Administration, in office since March 2013. He was an alternate of the 18th Central Committee of the Chinese Communist Party and is a member of the 19th Central Committee of the Chinese Communist Party. He was a representative of the 17th, 18th and 19th National Congress of the Chinese Communist Party.

== Biography ==
Wang was born in Shangqiu, Henan, in November 1958. He graduated from Peking University.

He entered the workforce in July 1976, and joined the Chinese Communist Party in December 1977. In 1987, he was despatched to the Ministry of Finance, becoming a secretary for the then minister Liu Zhongli in 1992. In 1993, he became deputy secretary-general of the Chinese Institute of Certified Public Accountants, but having held the position for only one year. He became the deputy director of the General Office of the Ministry of Finance in 1994, rising to director in July 1998. He rose to become assistant minister in September 2003 and vice minister in October 2005.

In March 2013, he took office as head of the State Taxation Administration.

== Books ==
- 中国转型期公共财政 [Public Finance in China's Transition Period] (in Chinese). Beijing: People's Publishing House. 2006. ISBN 9787010056982.
- 遥望地平线 [Look at the Horizon] (in Chinese). Beijing: Economic Science Press. 2004. ISBN 9787505841185.

Government offices
Preceded by Xiao Jie	Head of the State Taxation Administration; 2013–present	Incumbent
