= Xiang Huaicheng =

Chinese economist

- 项怀诚

Chairman of the National Council for Social Security Fund
- In office March 2003 – January 2008
- Premier: Wen Jiabao
- Preceded by: Liu Zhongli
- Succeeded by: Dai Xianglong

Minister of Finance
- In office 18 March 1998 – 17 March 2003
- Premier: Zhu Rongji
- Preceded by: Liu Zhongli
- Succeeded by: Jin Renqing

Personal details
- Born: February 1939 (age 87) Wujiang County, Jiangsu, China
- Party: Chinese Communist Party
- Education: Shandong University

Chinese name
- Simplified Chinese: 项怀诚
- Traditional Chinese: 項懷誠
Transcriptions
Standard Mandarin
- Hanyu Pinyin: Xiàng Huáichéng

Xiang Huaicheng (Chinese: 项怀诚; born February 1939) is a Chinese economist and former minister of finance of China.

== Biography ==
Xiang Huangcheng was born in Wujiang County, Jiangsu in February 1939. He joined Chinese Communist Party in 1983. He graduated from the Department of Chinese Literature at Shandong University in 1960, and is a senior economist.

1986.6–1992.5, deputy minister of finance, member of the party's committee.

1992.5–1994.7, deputy minister of finance, vice secretary of the party's committee.

1994.7–1995.1, deputy director of State Administration of Taxation, vice secretary of the party's committee.

1995.1–1998.3, deputy director of State Administration of Taxation, secretary of the party's committee.

1998.3–2003.3, minister of finance.

2003.5–2008.1, director-general of the national social security funds.

He was a member of 15th and 16th Central Committee of the Chinese Communist Party.

He is currently the Chairman of China Development Institute in Shenzhen.

Government offices
Preceded by Liu Zhongli	Minister of Finance; 1998–2003	Succeeded by Jin Renqing
Preceded by Liu Zhongli	Chairman of the National Council for Social Security Fund; 2003–2008	Succeeded by Dai Xianglong
