= Fang Weizhong =

Chinese politician (1928–2025)

- 房维中

Chairperson of the Economic Affairs Committee of the Chinese People's Political Consultative Conference
- In office 21 May 1993 – 15 March 2003
- Preceded by: Gu Mu
- Succeeded by: Liu Zhongli

Personal details
- Born: 11 February 1928 Dongfeng County, Jilin, China
- Died: 16 March 2025 (aged 97) Beijing, China
- Party: Chinese Communist Party
- Education: Northeastern University; Northeast Normal University

Chinese name
- Simplified Chinese: 房维中
- Traditional Chinese: 房維中
Transcriptions
Standard Mandarin
- Hanyu Pinyin: Fáng Wéizhōng

Fang Weizhong (Chinese: 房维中; 11 February 1928 – 16 March 2025) was a Chinese politician who served as chairperson of the Economic Affairs Committee of the Chinese People's Political Consultative Conference from 1993 to 2003.

Fang was an alternate member of the 12th Central Committee of the Chinese Communist Party and 14th Central Committee of the Chinese Communist Party and a member of the 13th Central Committee of the Chinese Communist Party. He was a member of the Standing Committee of the 8th Chinese People's Political Consultative Conference and 9th Chinese People's Political Consultative Conference.

== Early life and education ==
Fang was born in Dongfeng County, Jilin, on 11 February 1928. He graduated from Northeastern University and Northeast Normal University.

== Career ==
Fang joined the Chinese Communist Party (CCP) in 1950.

Fang successively served as a member of the Propaganda Department of the Northeast Bureau of the CCP Central Committee, deputy director of the Research and Editing Office of the State Planning Commission (now National Development and Reform Commission), researcher of the General Office of the CCP Central Committee, head of the Research Office of the State Planning Commission, deputy director of the National Development and Reform Commission, director of the People's Bank of China, and vice chairman of the China Planning Society and the China Enterprise Management Association. In 1993, he became, a position he held until 年. Fang died on 16 March 2025, aged 97.

Assembly seats
Preceded by Gu Mu	Chairperson of the Economic Affairs Committee of the Chinese People's Political Consultative Conference; 1993–2003	Succeeded by Liu Zhongli
