= Zhang Jingfu =

Chinese politician

- 张劲夫

Director of the State Economic Commission
- In office May 1982 – September 1984
- Preceded by: Yuan Baohua
- Succeeded by: Lü Dong

Governor and Communist Party Secretary of Anhui
- In office 1980–1982
- Preceded by: Wan Li
- Succeeded by: Zhou Zijian

5th Minister of Finance
- In office 17 January 1975 – 17 August 1979
- Preceded by: Yin Chengzhen
- Succeeded by: Wu Bo

Personal details
- Born: Zhang Shide (张世德); June 6, 1914 Feidong County, Anhui, Republic of China
- Died: July 31, 2015 (aged 101) Beijing, People's Republic of China
- Party: Chinese Communist Party (1935 onwards)
- Spouse: Hu Xiaofeng
- Children: 2
- Education: Nanjing Xiaozhuang School

Chinese name
- Traditional Chinese: 張勁夫
- Simplified Chinese: 张劲夫
Transcriptions
Standard Mandarin
- Hanyu Pinyin: Zhāng Jìngfū / Zhāng Jìnfū

Zhang Jingfu or Zhang Jinfu (Chinese: 张劲夫; 6 June 1914 – 31 July 2015) was a politician of the People's Republic of China. He served as Governor and Communist Party Secretary of Anhui province, Minister of Finance, and State Councilor of the 5th and 6th State Councils.

Zhang was an alternate member of the 8th Central Committee of the Chinese Communist Party, a member of the 11th and 12th Central Committees, a member of the 3rd and 4th Standing Committees of the CPPCC National Committee, and a Standing Committee member of the Central Advisory Commission.

== Biography ==
Zhang was born Zhang Shide (张世德) into a family of farming background in Feidong County, Anhui, on June 6, 1914. In 1930, he attended Nanjing Xiaozhuang School (南京晓庄学校), which was founded by Tao Xingzhi, a notable Chinese educator. He became an editor in Life Education (《生活教育》) in 1931. In the winter of 1932, he was a teacher, and then president of Dachangshan Haigong School (大场山海工学团).

He joined the Chinese Communist Party in December 1935 and worked in Shanghai. In 1937, after the outbreak of Second Sino-Japanese War, Shanghai was occupied by the Japanese army, he retreated to Wuhan and reestablish communications with the communist resistance forces.

Zhang was appointed the head of the Publicity Department of Anhui provincial government in April 1938. One year later, he became the deputy director of Political Department of Jiangbei (江北) headquarters of the New Fourth Army. A year later, he became the deputy director of Political Department of Second division of the New Fourth Army.

In 1940, Zhang became the Party Secretary of the Wandong Jinpu-Railway East Province (皖东津浦路东省), concurrently serving as director of the Political Department of the Fifth Detachment of the New Fourth Army and lead the formation of the Jinpu-Railway East Anti-Japanese Base Area. After February 1942, he served as a Political Commissar of Fourth Brigade of Second Division of the New Fourth Army, and concurrently served as Head of the Publicity Department of the Huainan region. In 1944, he volunteered to study at the Party School of the Central China Bureau, later the Central China University of Construction (and later merged into Shandong University), and became its vice-president after graduating.

After the founding of the People's Republic of China in 1949, he was appointed Vice-Mayor and Deputy Communist Party Secretary of Hangzhou, capital of Zhejiang province.

In 1956, he became the vice-president of the Chinese Academy of Sciences, serving as an assistant of President Guo Moruo.

In January 1975 he was promoted to become the Finance Minister of China, a position he held until August 1979. In 1980, he served as Governor and Communist Party Secretary of Anhui province, replacing Wan Li. In 1982, he was promoted to director of the State Economic Commission and State Councilor of China.

Zhang was elected a Standing Committee of the Central Advisory Commission at the 13th National Congress of the Chinese Communist Party.

Zhang died in Beijing on July 31, 2015. Zhang's body was cremated on August 6, 2015. China's seven senior leaders attended the funeral at Babaoshan Revolutionary Cemetery in west Beijing.

== Personal life ==
Zhang married Hu Xiaofeng (Chinese: 胡晓风), they had two sons, Zhang Bohai (Chinese: 张渤海) and Zhang Mao (Chinese: 张茅). Zhang Mao, who is married to the daughter of the former Vice Premier Gu Mu, serves as Minister of the State Administration for Industry and Commerce.

Government offices
| Preceded by Yin Chengzhen | Minister of Finance; 1975–1978 | Succeeded by Wu Bo |
| Preceded by Wan Li | Governor of Anhui; 1980–1982 | Succeeded by Zhou Zijian |
Party political offices
| Preceded by Wan Li | Party Secretary of Anhui; 1980–1982 | Succeeded by Zhou Zijian |
