= Minister of Finance (China) =

Minister of the People's Republic of China

Minister of Finance of the People's Republic of China
- 中华人民共和国财政部部长
- National Emblem of China

- Flag of China

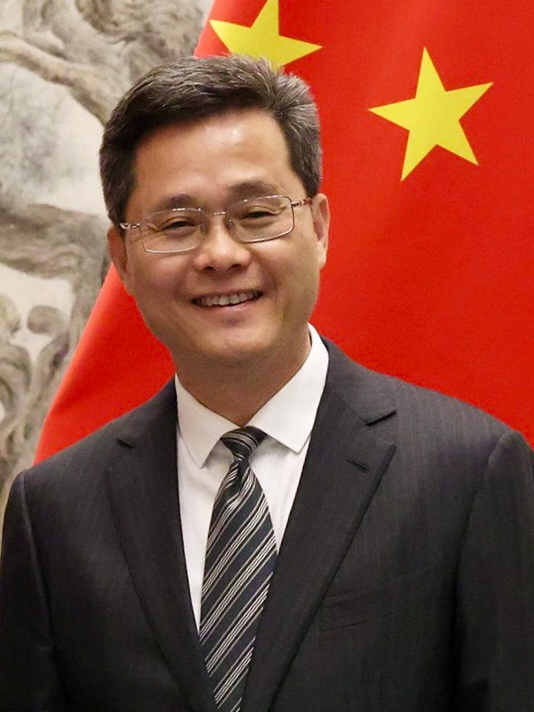
- Incumbent; Lan Fo'an since 24 October 2023
- Ministry of Finance
- Status: Provincial and ministerial-level official
- Member of: Plenary Meeting of the State Council
- Seat: Ministry of Finance Building, Xicheng District, Beijing
- Nominator: Premier (chosen within the Chinese Communist Party)
- Appointer: President with the confirmation of the National People's Congress or its Standing Committee
- Precursor: Minister of Finance of the Republic of China
- Formation: 19 October 1949; 76 years ago
- First holder: Bo Yibo
- Deputy: Vice Minister of Finance
- Website: www.mof.gov.cn/en/abus/

The minister of finance of the People's Republic of China is the head of the Ministry of Finance of the People's Republic of China and a member of the State Council. Within the State Council, the position is twelfth in order of precedence. The minister is responsible for leading the ministry, presiding over its meetings, and signing important documents related to the ministry. Officially, the minister is nominated by the premier of the State Council, who is then approved by the National People's Congress or its Standing Committee and appointed by the president.

The current minister is Lan Fo'an, who concurrently serves as the Chinese Communist Party Committee Secretary of the ministry.

== History ==
The Ministry of Finance of the Central People's Government was established on 1 October 1949, and Bo Yibo became the first minister on 19 October. The ministry was reorganized to the Ministry of Finance of the PRC in September 1954, and the title of the minister was also changed. On 1 July 1967, during the Cultural Revolution, the Central Committee of the Chinese Communist Party, the State Council and the Central Military Commission decided to implement military rule over the ministry; the Director of the Military Control Commission Yin Chengzhen served as the head of the ministry. The Military Control Commission was replaced with a Revolutionary Committee on 22 June 1970. The ministry was reorganized and restored its ministerial system in January 1975.

== List of ministers ==
No.	Portrait	Name (Birth–Death)	Term of office			Important offices held during tenure	Premier	Ref.
No.	Portrait	Name (Birth–Death)	Took office	Left office	Term	Important offices held during tenure	Premier	Ref.
Minister of Finance of the Central People's Government
1		Bo Yibo 薄一波 (1908–2007)	19 October 1949	18 September 1953	3 years, 334 days	Member of the Central People's Government; Deputy Director of the Finance and Economics Committee of the Central People's Government; First Secretary of the North China; Central Bureau of the Chinese Communist Party; Director of the National Organization Committee; Director of the Central People's Government's Economy Inspection Committee	Zhou Enlai	
2		Deng Xiaoping 邓小平 (1904–1997)	18 September 1953	19 June 1954	274 days	Secretary-General of the CCP Central Committee; Head of the Organization Department of the CCP Central Committee	Zhou Enlai	
3		Li Xiannian 李先念 (1909–1992)	19 June 1954	28 September 1954	101 days	Vice Premier of the State Council	Zhou Enlai	
Minister of Finance of the People's Republic of China
3		Li Xiannian 李先念 (1909–1992)	28 September 1954	22 June 1970	15 years, 267 days	Vice Premier of the State Council; Director of the State Council Finance and Trade Office; Deputy Head of the Central Finance and Economics Group	Zhou Enlai	
Director of the Military Control Commission (Revolutionary Committee) of the Ministry of Finance
4		Yin Chengzhen 殷承祯 (1915–1990)	22 June 1970	17 January 1975	4 years, 209 days		Zhou Enlai	
4		Yin Chengzhen 殷承祯 (1915–1990)	22 June 1970	17 January 1975	4 years, 209 days		Hua Guofeng	
Minister of Finance of the People's Republic of China
5		Zhang Jingfu 张劲夫 (1914–2015)	17 January 1975	17 August 1979	4 years, 212 days	Secretary of the Party Leadership Group of the Ministry of Finance; Deputy Secretary-General of the Financial and Economic Committee of the State Council	Hua Guofeng	
6		Wu Bo 吴波 (1906–2005)	17 August 1979	6 August 1980	355 days	Secretary of the Party Leadership Group of the Ministry of Finance	Hua Guofeng	
7		Wang Bingqian 王丙乾 (1925–2025)	6 August 1980	3 September 1992	12 years, 28 days	Secretary of the Party Leadership Group of the Ministry of Finance; State Councillor	Hua Guofeng ↓ Zhao Ziyang ↓ Li Peng	
8		Liu Zhongli 刘仲藜 (born 1934)	4 September 1992	18 March 1998	5 years, 195 days	Director of the State Taxation Administration	Li Peng	
9		Xiang Huaicheng 项怀诚 (born 1939)	18 March 1998	17 March 2003	4 years, 364 days		Zhu Rongji	
10		Jin Renqing 金人庆 (1944–2021)	17 March 2003	30 August 2007	4 years, 166 days	Secretary of the Party Leadership Group of the Ministry of Finance	Wen Jiabao	
11		Xie Xuren 谢旭人 (born 1947)	30 August 2007	16 March 2013	5 years, 198 days	Secretary of the Party Leadership Group of the Ministry of Finance	Wen Jiabao	
12		Lou Jiwei 楼继伟 (born 1950)	16 March 2013	7 November 2016	3 years, 236 days	Secretary of the Party Leadership Group of the Ministry of Finance	Li Keqiang	
13		Xiao Jie 肖捷 (born 1957)	7 November 2016	19 March 2018	1 year, 132 days	Secretary of the Party Leadership Group of the Ministry of Finance; Deputy Secretary-General of the State Council; Secretary of the Party Leadership Group of the State Council; Secretary of the Working Committee of Central and State Organs	Li Keqiang	
14		Liu Kun 刘昆 (born 1956)	19 March 2018	24 October 2023	5 years, 219 days	Secretary of the Party Leadership Group of the Ministry of Finance; Member of the Central Commission for Discipline Inspection	Li Keqiang	
14		Liu Kun 刘昆 (born 1956)	19 March 2018	24 October 2023	5 years, 219 days	Secretary of the Party Leadership Group of the Ministry of Finance; Member of the Central Commission for Discipline Inspection	Li Keqiang ↓ Li Qiang	
15		Lan Fo'an 蓝佛安 (born 1962)	24 October 2023	Incumbent	2 years, 318 days	Secretary of the Party Leadership Group of the Ministry of Finance	Li Qiang	
