= Zhou Zijian =

Chinese governor (1914–2003)

Zhou Zijian (Chinese: 周子健; pinyin: Zhōu Zǐjiàn) (April 1, 1914 – March 24, 2003) was the governor and Chinese Communist Party Provincial Committee Secretary for Anhui Province in the People's Republic of China from 1981 to 1983 and 1982 to 1983, respectively.

== Biography ==
Zhou was born on April 1, 1914. In 1930, he left his home in Linquan County, Anhui and traveled to Beiping to study and participate in the student movement there. In 1932, he participated in a peripheral organization of the Chinese Communist Party, the Great Anti-Imperialist Alliance, for which he undertook underground communications work. In January 1936, Zhou formally joined the Communist Party. From 1940 to 1946, he worked in the Xi'an office of the Eighth Route Army, and became the office's section chief and then office chief. Under an atmosphere of White Terror, Zhou completed every assignment put before him. For this, he received praise and affirmation from Mao Zedong, Zhou Enlai, Ren Bishi, and other central leaders. In April 1947, he was transferred to the secretariat of the United Front Work Department, where he became vice-head of the department, and then the department head.

In January 1949, Zhou was one of four members selected to be sent in advance to Beiping to participate in preparations for the new Chinese People's Political Consultative Conference that was to occur. He was in charge of receiving Zhongnanhai and Beijing restaurants. In 1950, Zhou was transferred to the Government Administration Council, the predecessor to the State Council of the People's Republic of China, where he was appointed vice-director of the secretariat, vice-chief of the administration bureau, and the first secretary of the Party Leadership Group of the administration bureau. In 1952, he was transferred to the first Ministry of Machine Building, where he became bureau chief, assistant to the Minister, Vice-Minister, and finally Minister. In 1981, Zhou became governor and Party Secretary for Anhui province. In 1983, he accepted an appointment to be a special advisor to the State Planning Commission. Zhou was an alternate member of the 11th Central Committee of the Chinese Communist Party, and a member of the 12th Central Committee. Zhou died on March 24, 2003.

Party political offices
Preceded by Zhang Jingfu	Communist Party Secretary of Anhui (Acting); 1982–1983	Succeeded by Huang Huang
Government offices
Preceded by Zhang Jingfu	Governor of Anhui; 1981–1983	Succeeded by Wang Yuzhao
