= Xiao Jie =

Chinese politician (born 1957)

- 肖捷
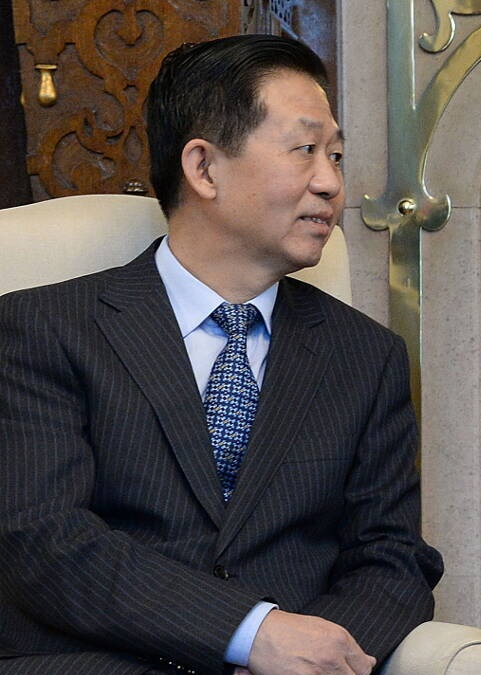

Vice Chairman of the Standing Committee of the National People's Congress
- Incumbent
- Assumed office 10 March 2023
- Chairman: Zhao Leji

State Councilor of China
- In office 19 March 2018 – 11 March 2023
- Premier: Li Keqiang

13th Secretary General of the State Council
- In office 19 March 2018 – 12 March 2023
- Premier: Li Keqiang
- Preceded by: Yang Jing
- Succeeded by: Wu Zhenglong

13th Minister of Finance
- In office 7 November 2016 – 19 March 2018
- Premier: Li Keqiang
- Preceded by: Lou Jiwei
- Succeeded by: Liu Kun

Personal details
- Born: June 1957 (age 69) Kaiyuan, Liaoning, China
- Party: Chinese Communist Party
- Education: Chinese Academy of Sciences; Renmin University of China

Xiao Jie (Chinese: 肖捷; born June 1957) is a Chinese politician and an important political aide of Premier Li Keqiang. He served as a State Councilor and the Secretary General of the State Council from 2018 to 2023. Xiao served as the Minister of Finance from November 2016 to March 2018. He previously served as Deputy Secretary-General of the State Council and chief of staff of Premier Li Keqiang, and the deputy director of the State Council Leading Group for the Nationwide Economy Census. He had also served as the director of the State Administration of Taxation.

== Biography ==
=== Early life and education ===
Born in Kaiyuan County, Liaoning Province, Xiao joined the Chinese Communist Party in August 1985. From March 1976 to October 1978, he worked in the Research Institute of Mechanics and the Research Institute of Mechanics and Electronics, affiliated with the Beijing mechanics bureau. From October 1978 to September 1982, he studied in the Department of Finance of Renmin University of China, majoring in finance and economics.

== Career ==
From September 1982 to January 1987, he was an officer of long-term planning in the general planning section of the Ministry of Finance. From January 1987 to December 1991, he was a deputy chief of long-term planning prediction in the general planning section of the Ministry of Finance. From December 1987 to April 1989, he studied in West Germany.

From December 1991 to November 1993, he was the chief of long-term planning and forecasting in the general planning department of Ministry of Finance. From October 1991 to October 1992, he was appointed deputy director of the economic planning commission of Fuxin, Liaoning Province. From November 1993 to July 1994, he was the vice section chief of the general planning section of the Ministry of Finance.

From July 1994 to July 1998, he was the vice section chief of the general reform section of the Ministry of Finance. From September 1994 to July 1995, he was trained at the CPC Central Party School as a young cadre. From September 1992 to July 1995, he pursued an on-the-job doctoral degree in finance at the Research Institute of Financial Sciences of the Ministry of Finance.

From July 1998 to June 2000, he was the chief of the administrative office of the Ministry of Finance, and from June 2000 to September 2001, he was the chief of the national treasury department of the Ministry of Finance. From September 2001 to July 2005, he served as Vice-Minister of Finance, and a Party Committee member.

From July 2005 to August 2007, he was the vice governor of Hunan Province, and a member of the Hunan Provincial Party Standing Committee. In August 2007, Xiao was appointed the director of the State Administration of Taxation.

From March 2013 to November 2016, he was the Deputy Secretary-General of the State Council and Head of the Premier Li Keqiang's Office.

In November 2016, Xiao was appointed the Minister of Finance, replacing Lou Jiwei. In March 2018, Xiao was appointed the State Councilor and the Secretary General of the State Council.

On March 10, 2023, during the 14th National People's Congress, he was appointed Vice Chairman of the Standing Committee of the National People's Congress.

Xiao is a member of the 19th Central Committee of the Chinese Communist Party and also served on the 18th Central Committee and 17th Central Committee.

Government offices
Preceded by Xie Xuren	Director of State Administration of Taxation; 2007–2013	Succeeded by Wang Jun
Preceded by Lou Jiwei	Minister of Finance; 2016–2018	Succeeded by Liu Kun
Preceded by Yang Jing	Secretary General of the State Council; 2018–2023	Succeeded by Wu Zhenglong
