= State Taxation Administration =

China's internal revenue service

- 国家税务总局
- The cap badge for civil servant of State Administration of Taxation and its affiliates.

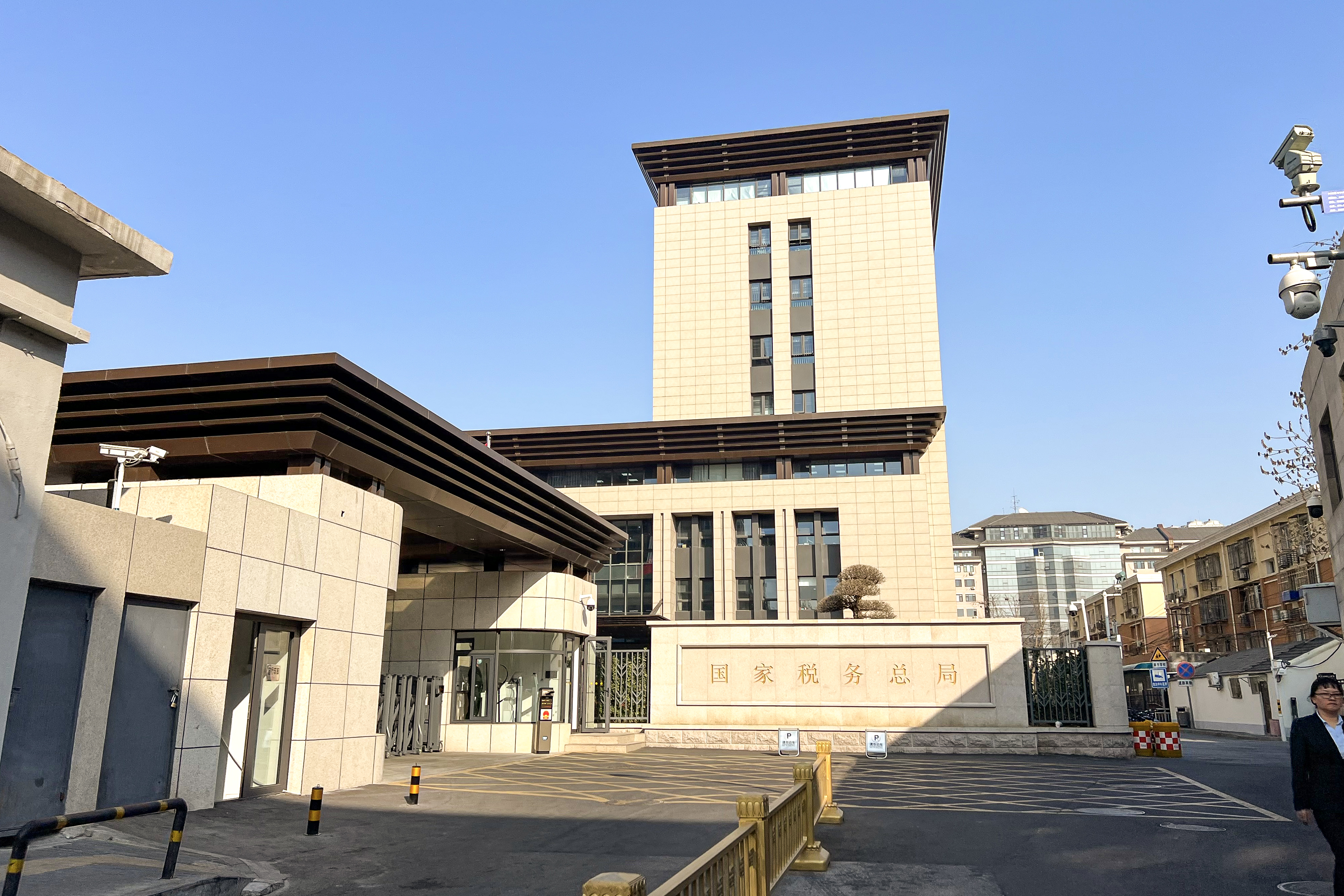
- Headquarters in Beijing

Agency overview
- Formed: 1958
- Jurisdiction: Government of China
- Headquarters: Beijing
- Agency executive: Hu Jinglin, Director of State Taxation Administration
- Parent agency: State Council
- Website: www.chinatax.gov.cn

The State Taxation Administration (STA; Chinese: 国家税务总局) is a ministerial-level department within the government of the People's Republic of China. It is under the direction of the State Council, and is responsible for the collection of taxes and enforces the state revenue laws. Previously known as State Administration of Taxation.

== Powers and duties ==
- Drafting tax laws and regulations; formulating detailed implementation rules for tax laws and regulations; putting forward suggestions on tax policies, and together with the Ministry of Finance, reviewing the suggestions and submitting them to the State Council; formulating implementation rules for tax policies.
- Measuring the overall tax burden and putting forward suggestions on how to use tax for regulation purpose; formulating tax rules and procedures and supervising their implementation; providing guidance for local tax collection and administration.
- Organizing collection and administration for central taxes, shared taxes and contributions to state-designated funds; working out revenue plans; providing interpretation for issues concerning tax collection and administration and general tax policy issues arising from the implementation of tax laws and regulations.
- Conducting international exchange and cooperation on taxation; negotiating and applying agreements on avoidance of double taxation and prevention of fiscal evasion with respect to taxes on income and capital.
- Regulating the collection and refund of VAT and Excise Tax on imports and exports.
- Being responsible for the administration of human resources, salary, size and expenditure of SAT local offices; appointing and supervising the work of directors and deputy directors at the provincial level of SAT offices; advising on the appointment and removal of directors of local tax service at the provincial level.
- Facilitating education and training for tax staff at all levels to build up their professional skills and ethical standards.
- Organizing tax theoretical research and activities to promote tax awareness among the public; serving and regulating certified tax agents and tax agencies.
- Other mandates entrusted by the State Council.

== Organization ==
The Commissioner and four Deputy Commissioners of SAT are appointed by the State Council.

One Chief Economist and one Chief Accountant are also members of SAT's top leadership.

=== Departments ===
There are 14 functional departments within the Headquarters of SAT, each of which consists of several divisions (offices) as follows:

Departments	Functions & Divisions
General Office	consisting of Division of Secretaries, Secretariat Division, Supervisory Division, Comprehensive Research Division, News Division and Financial Division
Policy and Legislation Department	consisting of Division of Comprehensive Affairs, Tax Reform Division, Legislative Division and Appeal Division
Turnover Tax Department	( in charge of the administration of VAT, Consumption Tax and Business Tax): consisting of Comprehensive Division, VAT Division, Consumption Tax Division and Business Tax Division
Income tax Administration Department	(in charge of administration of Enterprise Income Tax and Individual Income Tax): consisting of Comprehensive Division, Central Enterprise Income Tax Division, Local Enterprise Income Tax Division and Individual Income Tax Division
Local Tax Department	(in charge of administration of Resource Tax, City and Township Land Use Tax, City Maintenance and Construction Tax, Fixed Assets Investment Orientation Regulation Tax, Land Appreciation Tax, House Property Tax, Vehicle and Vessel Usage Tax, Stamp Tax, Slaughter Tax and Banquet Tax): consisting of Comprehensive Division, Local Tax Division I, Local Tax Division II and Local Tax Division III;
Agriculture Tax Bureau	(in charge of administration of Agriculture Tax, Animal Husbandry Tax, Deed Tax and Farmland Occupation Tax): consisting of Comprehensive Division, Agriculture Tax Division I and Agriculture Tax II
International Taxation Department	(Offshore Oil Tax Bureau): consisting of Comprehensive Tax Policy Division, Tax Administration Division, Anti-Tax Avoidance Division, Offshore Oil Tax Division, International Tax Treaty Division, Foreign Affairs Division and Foreign Cooperative Division;
Import and Export Tax Department	( responsible for VAT and Consumption Tax on importation and exportation ): consisting of Comprehensive Division, Import Tax Division and Export Tax Division;
Administration and Collection Department	consisting of Comprehensive Division, Tax Propaganda Division, Invoice Management Division and Open Market Tax Division;
Tax Investigation Department	consisting of Comprehensive Division, Procedure Division, Investigation Division I and Investigation Division II
Financial Management Department	consisting of Funding Division, Infrastructure Division and Equipment Division;
Planning and Statistical Department	consisting of Comprehensive Division, Planning Division, Statistical Division and Macro-Analysis Division;
Personnel Department	consisting of Comprehensive Division Personnel Division for Headquarters, Personnel Division for Local Offices, Recruit Division and Grass-root Work Division; and
Supervision Bureau	(representative office of Supervision Ministry):consisting of Secretariat Division, Discipline Inspection and Supervision Division and Division for Letters of Complaints.

=== Others ===
Besides, some non-governmental institutions directly under the Headquarters of SAT are Education Center, Logistical Service Center, Information Technology Center, Registered Tax Agent Management Center, Tax Science Research Institute, China Taxation Magazine, China Taxation Newspaper, China Taxation Press, Yangzhou Training Center and Changchun Tax College.

== Tax classification ==
Category of Taxes	Type of Taxes
Turnover Taxes	VAT
Turnover Taxes	Consumption Tax
Turnover Taxes	Business Tax
Income Taxes	Enterprise Income Tax
Income Taxes	Income Tax on Enterprises With Foreign Investment and Foreign Enterprise
Income Taxes	Individual Income Tax
Resource Taxes	Resource Tax
Resource Taxes	Urban and Township Land Use Tax
Special Purpose Taxes	City Maintenance and Construction Tax
Special Purpose Taxes	Farmland Occupation Tax
Special Purpose Taxes	Fixed Assets Investment Orientation Regulation Tax
Special Purpose Taxes	Land Appreciation Tax
Property Taxes	House Property Tax
Property Taxes	City Real Estate Tax
Property Taxes	Inheritance Tax
Behavioral Taxes	Vehicle and Vessel Usage Tax
Behavioral Taxes	Vehicle and Vessel Usage Plate Tax
Behavioral Taxes	Stamp Tax
Behavioral Taxes	Deed Tax
Behavioral Taxes	Security Exchange Tax
Behavioral Taxes	Slaughter Tax
Behavioral Taxes	Banquet Tax
Agriculture Taxes	Agriculture Tax
Agriculture Taxes	Animal Husbandry Tax
Customs Duties	Customs Duties

Notes:

1. Slaughter Tax, Banquet Tax and Animal Husbandry Tax are now decentralised to the local governments for administration. Whether levying or not shall be at the discretion of the governments at provincial level for decision by taking into account the local conditions.

2. Inheritance Tax and Security Exchange Tax have not yet been legislated to date.

== Policy ==
In 2015, the State Administration of Taxation prohibited local tax authorities from inspecting e-commerce businesses.

== List of directors ==
Name	Chinese name	Took office	Left office
Li Yu'ang	李予昂	1949	1958
Ren Ziliang	任子良	1961	1978
Liu Zhicheng	刘志城	1978	1984
Jin Xin	金鑫	1984	1994
Liu Zhongli	刘仲藜	1994	March 1998
Jin Renqing	金人庆	March 1998	March 2003
Xie Xuren	谢旭人	March 2003	August 2007
Xiao Jie	肖捷	August 2007	March 2013
Wang Jun	王军	March 2013	December 2023
Hu Jinglin	胡静林	December 2023	Incumbent
