= Liu Kun =

Chinese politician (born 1956)

- 刘昆
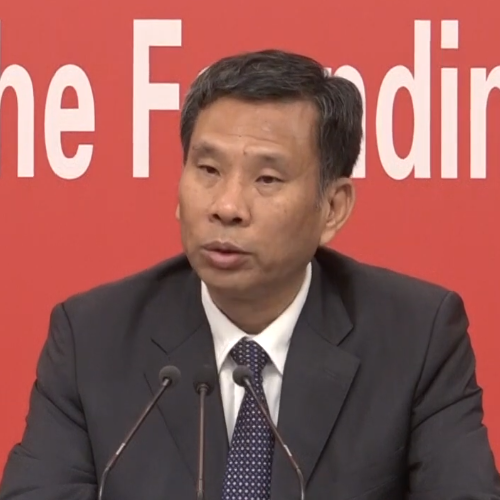
- Liu in 2019

14th Minister of Finance
- In office 19 March 2018 – 24 October 2023
- Premier: Li Keqiang (2018–2023); Li Qiang (2023)
- Preceded by: Xiao Jie
- Succeeded by: Lan Fo'an

Director of Budgetary Affairs Commission of the National People's Congress
- In office December 2016 – March 2018
- Chairman: Zhang Dejiang; Li Zhanshu
- Preceded by: Liao Xiaojun
- Succeeded by: Shi Yaobin

Personal details
- Born: December 1956 (age 69) Raoping County, Guangdong, China
- Party: Chinese Communist Party
- Education: Xiamen University; Central Party School

Liu Kun
- Simplified Chinese: 刘昆
- Traditional Chinese: 劉昆
Transcriptions
Standard Mandarin
- Hanyu Pinyin: Liú Kūn
- Wade–Giles: Liu^{2}K'un^{1}
Yue: Cantonese
- Jyutping: Lau^{4} Gwan^{1}
Southern Min
- Teochew Peng'im: Lao^{5} Kung^{1}

Liu Kun (simplified Chinese: 刘昆; traditional Chinese: 劉昆; pinyin: Liú Kūn; born December 1956) is a Chinese politician who served as the Minister of Finance from 2018 to 2023. Previously he served as director of Budgetary Affairs Commission of the National People's Congress, vice minister of Finance, and vice governor of Guangdong.

== Early life and education ==
Liu was born in Raoping County, Guangdong in December 1956. In June 1973, during the Cultural Revolution, he was forced to work in a factory in Yunxiao County, Fujian instead of going to university. He entered Xiamen University in February 1978, majoring in finance and monetary economics at the School of Economics, where he graduated in February 1982.

== Career ==
Beginning in 1982, he served in various posts in the Office of the Guangdong Provincial Government, where he served as deputy director until December 2001. He joined the Chinese Communist Party in July 1984. In December 2001 he was promoted to become deputy secretary-general of Guangdong Provincial Government, a department-level position he held until October 2002. He was director of Guangdong Provincial Department of Finance in October 2002, and held that office until July 2010. In July 2010 he was promoted again to become vice-governor of Guangdong, he remained in that position until May 2013, when he was transferred to Beijing and appointed vice minister of Finance. He became director of Budgetary Affairs Commission of the National People's Congress in December 2016, and served until March 2018. On March 19, 2018, he was elected minister of Finance at the first session of the 13th National People's Congress.

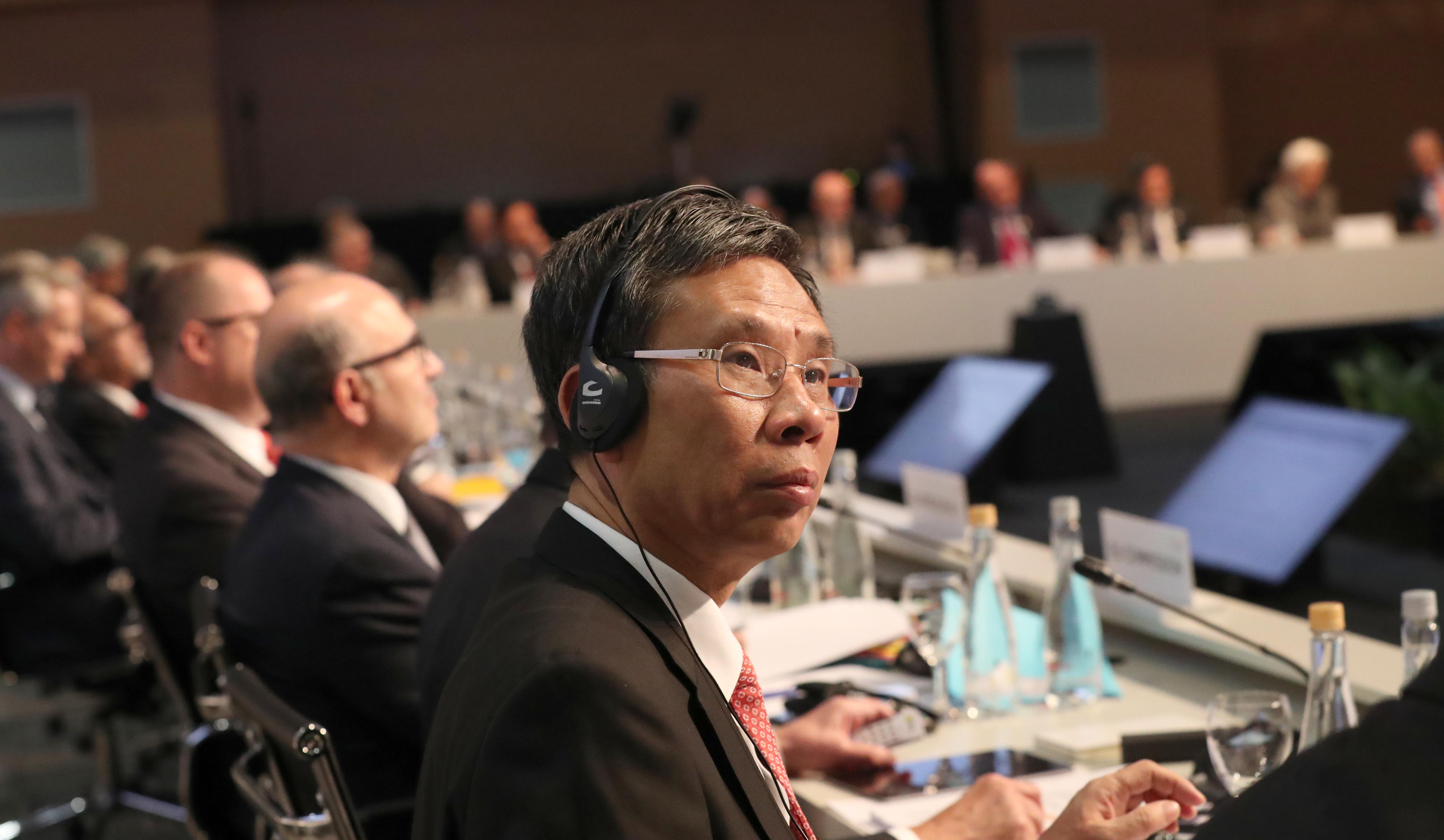
Liu in 2018

Liu was a member of the 19th Central Commission for Discipline Inspection. He was a delegate to the 10th and 11th, 12th and 13th National People's Congresses.

In August 2018, Liu told Reuters of potential job losses from the US–China trade war. In October 2018, Liu, as finance minister, stated that China prepared various support measures like export assistance and skills training to help businesses impacted by the trade war with the US.

On 28 September 2023, he was succeeded by Lan Fo'an as the Communist Party secretary of the Ministry of Finance. On 24 October, he was succeeded by Lan as the minister of Finance.

Government offices
| Preceded by Xiao Jie | Minister of Finance; 2018–2023 | Succeeded by Lan Fo'an |
