= Wang Bingqian =

Chinese politician (1925–2025)

- 王丙乾

Vice Chairman of the Standing Committee of the National People's Congress
- In office 27 March 1993 – 16 March 1998
- Chairperson: Qiao Shi

State Councilor of China
- In office June 1983 – March 1993
- Premier: Zhao Ziyang; Li Peng

Minister of Finance
- In office 6 August 1980 – 3 September 1992
- Premier: Hua Guofeng; Zhao Ziyang; Li Peng
- Preceded by: Wu Bo
- Succeeded by: Liu Zhongli

Personal details
- Born: 26 June 1925 Hebei, China
- Died: 8 December 2025 (aged 100) Guangdong, China
- Party: Chinese Communist Party
- Education: Central University of Finance and Economics

Wang Bingqian (Chinese: 王丙乾; pinyin: Wáng Bǐngqián; 26 June 1925 – 8 December 2025) was a Chinese politician who served as a Minister of Finance.

== Life and career ==
Born in Li County, Hebei, Wang joined the Chinese Communist Party (CCP) in January 1940.

Wang was a member of the 13th Central Committee of the Chinese Communist Party.

Wang died in Guangdong on 8 December 2025, at the age of 100.

Government offices
Preceded by Wu Bo	Minister of Finance; 1980–1992	Succeeded by Liu Zhongli
