= Wu Bo =

Chinese politician

- 吴波

Minister of Finance
- In office 17 August 1979 – 6 August 1980
- Premier: Hua Guofeng
- Preceded by: Zhang Jingfu
- Succeeded by: Wang Bingqian

Personal details
- Born: 1906 Jing County, Anhui, Qing China
- Died: 2005 (aged 98–99) Beijing, China
- Party: Chinese Communist Party

Chinese name
- Simplified Chinese: 吴波
- Traditional Chinese: 吳波
Transcriptions
Standard Mandarin
- Hanyu Pinyin: Wú Bō

Wu Bo (Chinese: 吴波; 1906 – 21 February 2005) was a Chinese politician who served as Minister of Finance between 1978 and 1980. He was a delegate to the 8th and 12th National Congress of the Chinese Communist Party, and a delegate to the 3rd National People's Congress. He was a member of the 5th Standing Committee of the Chinese People's Political Consultative Conference and a member of the 6th Standing Committee of the National People's Congress.

== Biography ==
Wu was born in Jing County, Anhui, in 1906, during the late Qing dynasty. He joined the communist revolution in June 1939 and joined Chinese Communist Party in September 1941. During the Second Sino-Japanese War, he served in the Eighth Route Army in Shanxi-Chahar-Hebei Border Region and then Shaanxi-Gansu-Ningxia Border Region. During the Chinese Civil War, he worked in economic and financial section of Shanxi-Chahar-Hebei Border Region.

After the establishment of the Communist State in 1949, he was appointed vice minister of finance, vice president of the People's Bank of China, and deputy party secretary of Finance and Trade Commission of the State Council. In the ten-year Cultural Revolution, he suffered political persecution. In 1978, he was reinstated in the post of minister of finance, but having held the position for only two years. In June 1983, he became vice chairperson of the National People's Congress Financial and Economic Affairs Committee, serving in the post until his retirement in March 1988.

He died from an illness in Beijing, aged 99.

Government offices
Preceded by Zhang Jingfu	Minister of Finance; 1978–1980	Succeeded by Wang Bingqian
