= Xie Xuren =

Chinese politician

- 谢旭人
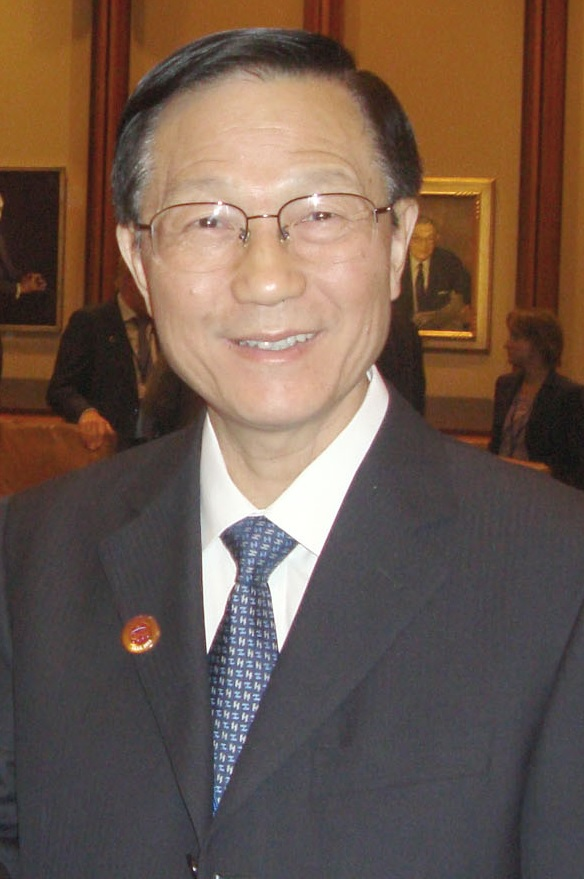
- Xie in 2011

Chairman of the National Council for Social Security Fund
- In office 19 March 2013 – November 2016
- Premier: Li Keqiang
- Preceded by: Dai Xianglong
- Succeeded by: Lou Jiwei

Minister of Finance
- In office 30 August 2007 – 16 March 2013
- Premier: Wen Jiabao
- Preceded by: Jin Renqing
- Succeeded by: Lou Jiwei

Head of the State Taxation Administration
- In office March 2003 – August 2007
- Premier: Wen Jiabao
- Preceded by: Jin Renqing
- Succeeded by: Xiao Jie

Personal details
- Born: October 1947 (age 78) Ningbo, China
- Party: Chinese Communist Party
- Education: Zhejiang University
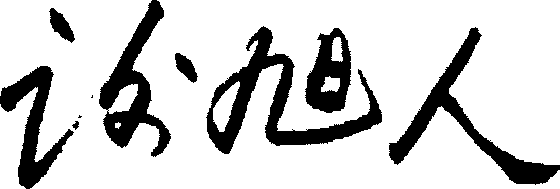
- Signature

Xie Xuren
- Traditional Chinese: 謝旭人
- Simplified Chinese: 谢旭人
Transcriptions
Standard Mandarin
- Hanyu Pinyin: Xiè Xùrén

Xie Xuren (Chinese: 谢旭人; born October 1947) is a Chinese politician, serving since 2013 as the Chair of the National Council for Social Security Fund. Previously he served as Minister of Finance of People's Republic of China, and Director-General of the State Administration of Taxation. He was also a member of the 17th Central Committee of the Chinese Communist Party.

== Biography ==
Xie was born in 1947 in Ningbo, Zhejiang province. Xie first worked for Ningbo Zhenhai Machinery Factory. At beginning, Xie was in charge of the factory's general facilities, but later he was promoted to its vice-president. Xie joined the Chinese Communist Party in 1980.

From September 1981 to January 1984, Xie studied at Zhejiang University in Hangzhou and majored in industrial finance management. Soon after graduation, Xie joined local government of Yuyao, a county (currently a city) of Ningbo, and he was the subprefect of Yuyao. Later Xie was transferred to Yin County, a county (now a core district) of Ningbo, and became the head of the county. In September 1985, Xie was promoted to the provincial government of Zhejiang Province in Hangzhou. He was the Director of Zhejiang Provincial Economic Information Center.

Xie was also a senior economist in the government. In May 1990, Xie was promoted to the Ministry of Finance of China's central government in Beijing. In 1998, he became governor of the Agricultural Development Bank of China. In 2002, he was selected as an alternate of the 16th CPC Central Committee, until 2007. From 2003 to 2007, he was the Director-General and Secretary-General of the State Administration of Taxation of P.R.China. In 2007, he was pointed to be the Minister of Finance of P.R.China. And then became a member of the 17th CPC Central Committee.

Xie was also one of the leaders representing China during the U.S.–China Strategic and Economic Dialogue in 2009.

== Policies and reform ==
=== Abolishment of agricultural taxes ===
In 2005, in about 28 provinces (including autonomous regions and municipalities), the agricultural taxes were cancelled. From 1949 to 2005, the total income of China's national agricultural taxes was about 420 billion yuan.

On 1 January 2006, the old regulations and laws about agricultural taxes were abolished, since then all agricultural taxes (except for tobacco) have been cancelled in mainland China, thus ended China's 2600-year history of agricultural taxes.

=== Revenue ===
In 2007, China's revenue reached a new historic height at 5.13 trillion yuan.

Although since late 2008, China has also been heavily influenced by the 2008 financial crisis, Xie stated on January 5, 2009, that 2008 China's revenue (tax income) "are expected to breakthrough 6 trillion yuan", which would be an over 20% increase of 2007.

== See also ==
- China Economic Stimulus Program

Business positions
Preceded by Zhu Yuanliang	Governor of the Agricultural Development Bank of China; 1998–2000	Succeeded by He Linxiang
Government offices
Preceded by Jin Renqing	Director of State Administration of Taxation; 2003–2007	Succeeded by Xiao Jie
Preceded by Jin Renqing	Minister of Finance; 2007–2013	Succeeded by Lou Jiwei
Preceded by Dai Xianglong	Chairman of the National Council for Social Security Fund; 2013–2016	Succeeded by Lou Jiwei
