= Zhang Zuoji =

Chinese politician (1945–2021)

- 张左己

Chairperson of the Economic Affairs Committee of the Chinese People's Political Consultative Conference
- In office March 2008 – March 2013
- Preceded by: Liu Zhongli
- Succeeded by: Zhou Bohua

Governor of Heilongjiang
- In office March 2003 – 25 December 2007
- Preceded by: Song Fatang
- Succeeded by: Li Zhanshu

Minister of Labour and Social Security
- In office March 1998 – March 2003
- Preceded by: New title
- Succeeded by: Zheng Silin

Personal details
- Born: 18 January 1945 Bayan County, Binjiang Province, Manchukuo
- Died: 11 June 2021 (aged 76) Harbin, Heilongjiang, China
- Party: Chinese Communist Party
- Education: Heilongjiang University; Central Party School of the Chinese Communist Party

Chinese name
- Simplified Chinese: 张左己
- Traditional Chinese: 張左己
Transcriptions
Standard Mandarin
- Hanyu Pinyin: Zhāng Zuǒjǐ

Zhang Zuoji (18 January 1945 – 11 June 2021) was a Chinese politician and the former governor of Heilongjiang. He also served as the director of the economic committee of the 11th Chinese People's Political Consultative Conference (CPPCC).

== Biography ==
Born in Bayan County, Binjiang Province (now Heilongjiang), Zhang joined the Chinese Communist Party (CCP) in June 1972. He graduated from the department of foreign languages of Heilongjiang University, majoring in the Russian language. From 1968 to 1977, he was a high school teacher in the national 123 factory, an officer of its propaganda department and the vice president of the CCP party school there. Later, he served in the Ministry of the 5th Mechanical Industry, the Ministry of Weaponry Industry, and the Ministry of Labor and Personnel (Ministry of Labor). In August 1991, he was appointed vice mayor of Xi'an, in Shaanxi Province. In February 1993, he became the deputy Minister of Labor. From November 1994 to 1998, he served as vice secretary-general of the State Council of the People's Republic of China. He was elected to be a member of the Central Commission for Discipline Inspection during the 15th National Congress of the Chinese Communist Party in September 1997. From March 1998 to March 2003, he served as Minister of Labor and Social Security. In March 2003, he was appointed vice secretary of the CCP Heilongjiang committee, and was elected as vice governor and acting governor of Heilongjiang in April of that year. He was confirmed as governor later and served in this post until December 2007. In March 2008, Zhang became chairperson of the Economic Affairs Committee of the Chinese People's Political Consultative Conference.

On 11 June 2021, he died of illness in Harbin, Heilongjiang, aged 76.

Zhang was a member of the 16th and 17th Central Committee of the Chinese Communist Party. He was a standing committee member of the 11th Chinese People's Political Consultative Conference.

Government offices
New title	Minister of Labour and Social Security; 1998–2003	Succeeded by Zheng Silin
Preceded by Song Fatang	Governor of Heilongjiang; 2003–2007	Succeeded by Li Zhanshu
Assembly seats
Preceded by Liu Zhongli	Chairperson of the Economic Affairs Committee of the Chinese People's Political Consultative Conference; 2008–2013	Succeeded by Zhou Bohua
