= Liu Zhongli =

Chinese politician

- 刘仲藜

Chairperson of the Economic Affairs Committee of the Chinese People's Political Consultative Conference
- In office March 2003 – March 2008
- Chairman: Jia Qinglin
- Preceded by: Fang Weizhong
- Succeeded by: Zhang Zuoji

Chairman of the National Council for Social Security Fund
- In office December 2000 – March 2003
- Preceded by: New title
- Succeeded by: Xiang Huaicheng

Director of the State Taxation Administration
- In office February 1994 – March 1998
- Premier: Li Peng
- Preceded by: Jin Xin
- Succeeded by: Jin Renqing

Minister of Finance
- In office 4 September 1992 – 18 March 1998
- Premier: Li Peng
- Preceded by: Wang Bingqian
- Succeeded by: Jin Renqing

Personal details
- Born: October 1934 (age 91–92) Yin County, Zhejiang, China
- Party: Chinese Communist Party
- Education: Central Party School of the Chinese Communist Party

Chinese name
- Simplified Chinese: 刘仲藜
- Traditional Chinese: 劉仲藜
Transcriptions
Standard Mandarin
- Hanyu Pinyin: Liú Zhònglí

Liu Zhongli (Chinese: 刘仲藜; born October 1934) is the former Minister of Finance of the People's Republic of China, and former director of State Administration of Taxation of PRC. He also served as first president of National Council for Social Security Fund of PRC. He is the current president of Chinese Institute of Certified Public Accountants.

== Biography ==
Born in Yin County (now Ningbo), Zhejiang, Liu joined Chinese Communist Party in 1954. After serving in various posts in Heilongjiang Province for more than 30 years, Liu was transferred to Ministry of Finance in 1988, and became deputy Minister and vice director of enterprises management advisory commission of the State Council. He was appointed vice secretary-general of the State Council in 1990. In September 1992, Liu became the Minister of Finance, and from 1994 to 1998, he also served as the head of State Administration of Taxation. In March 1998, he was appointed director of Office of Economic Policy Reform of the State Council.

Liu retired in December 2000, and became the first president of newly formed National Council for Social Security Fund. From March 2003 to March 2008, Liu served in 10th Chinese People's Political Consultative Conference (CPPCC) as the director of its economic committee.

Liu was a member of 14th and 15th Central Committees of Chinese Communist Party.

Government offices
| Preceded by Wang Bingqian | Minister of Finance; 1992–1998 | Succeeded by Xiang Huaicheng |
| Preceded by Jin Xin | Director of the State Taxation Administration; 1994–1998 | Succeeded by Jin Renqing |
| New title | Chairman of the National Council for Social Security Fund; 2000–2003 | Succeeded by Xiang Huaicheng |
Assembly seats
| Preceded by Fang Weizhong | Chairperson of the Economic Affairs Committee of the Chinese People's Political Consultative Conference; 2003–2008 | Succeeded by Zhang Zuoji |
