= Jin Renqing =

Chinese politician (1944–2021)

- 金人庆
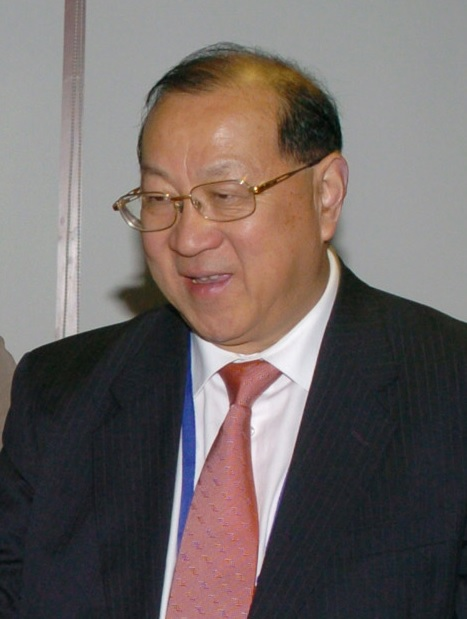
- Jin in 2006

Deputy Director of the Development Research Center of the State Council
- In office 30 August 2007 – 23 November 2009
- Premier: Wen Jiabao
- Director: Zhang Yutai

Minister of Finance
- In office 17 March 2003 – 30 August 2007
- Premier: Wen Jiabao
- Preceded by: Xiang Huaicheng
- Succeeded by: Xie Xuren

Director of the State Taxation Administration
- In office 1 April 1998 – 6 May 2003
- Premier: Zhu Rongji
- Preceded by: Liu Zhongli
- Succeeded by: Xie Xuren

Personal details
- Born: 29 July 1944 Suzhou, China
- Died: 28 August 2021 (aged 77) Haidian District, China
- Party: Chinese Communist Party
- Education: Central University of Finance and Economics
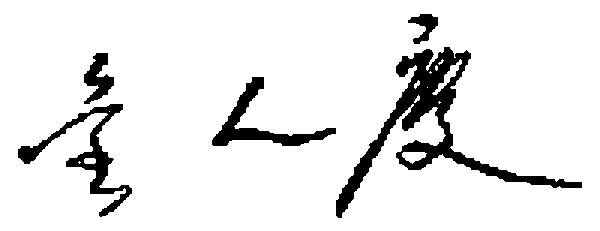
- Signature

Chinese name
- Simplified Chinese: 金人庆
- Traditional Chinese: 金人慶
Transcriptions
Standard Mandarin
- Hanyu Pinyin: Jīn Rénqìng
- Wade–Giles: Chin Jen-ch'ing

Jin Renqing (Chinese: 金人庆; 29 July 1944 – 28 August 2021) was a Chinese politician, member of the 16th Central Committee of the Chinese Communist Party, serving as deputy chief of the Development Research Center of the State Council. He also served as finance minister from 2003 to 2007.

== Biography ==
Jin was born in Suzhou, Jiangsu, on 29 July 1944. Jin served in such positions as commissioner of the State Administration of Taxation, vice governor of Yunnan, deputy secretary general of the State Council, and executive vice mayor of Beijing. He served as Finance Minister, from 2003 until his resignation at age 63 in August 2007. During his tenure, China enjoyed economic growth and an increase in foreign currency reserves, while also experiencing an increase in its trade deficit to the US. Jin was succeeded by tax administrator Xie Xuren. On 28 August 2021, he died of fire burns in Haidian District, Beijing, aged 77.

== Sex scandal ==
At the time of Jin's resignation the Hong Kong media have speculated a sex scandal. On 8 September 2007, Ming Pao reported that, Jin was in detention assisting security officials with their enquiries. In June 2011, WikiLeaks released a leaked US State Department cable dated 20 September 2007 which claims that Jin was sacked for his role in a sex scandal with a female intelligence operative from Taiwan. The cable claims that the alleged spy had affairs with several Chinese officials including former agricultural minister Du Qinglin, former party secretary of Qingdao Du Shicheng and the China Petroleum and Chemical Corporation (Sinopec) chairman Chen Tonghai.

Government offices
Preceded by Liu Zhongli	Director of State Administration of Taxation; 1998–2003	Succeeded by Xie Xuren
Preceded by Xiang Huaicheng	Minister of Finance; 2003–2007	Succeeded by Xie Xuren
