= Zheng Silin =

Chinese politician (1940–2022)

- 郑斯林

Minister of Labor and Social Security
- In office 17 March 2003 – June 2005
- Preceded by: Zhang Zuoji
- Succeeded by: Tian Chengping

Governor of Jiangsu
- In office September 1994 – September 1998
- Preceded by: Chen Huanyou
- Succeeded by: Ji Yunshi

Personal details
- Born: May 1940 Suzhou, Jiangsu, China
- Died: 9 May 2022 (aged 82)
- Party: CCP
- Education: Taiyuan University of Technology

Zheng Silin (Chinese: 郑斯林; May 1940 – 9 May 2022) was a Chinese politician. A member of the Chinese Communist Party, he served as Minister of Labor and Social Security from 2003 to 2005. He died on 9 May 2022.
