= National Government Offices Administration =

Government agency of China

- 国家机关事务管理局
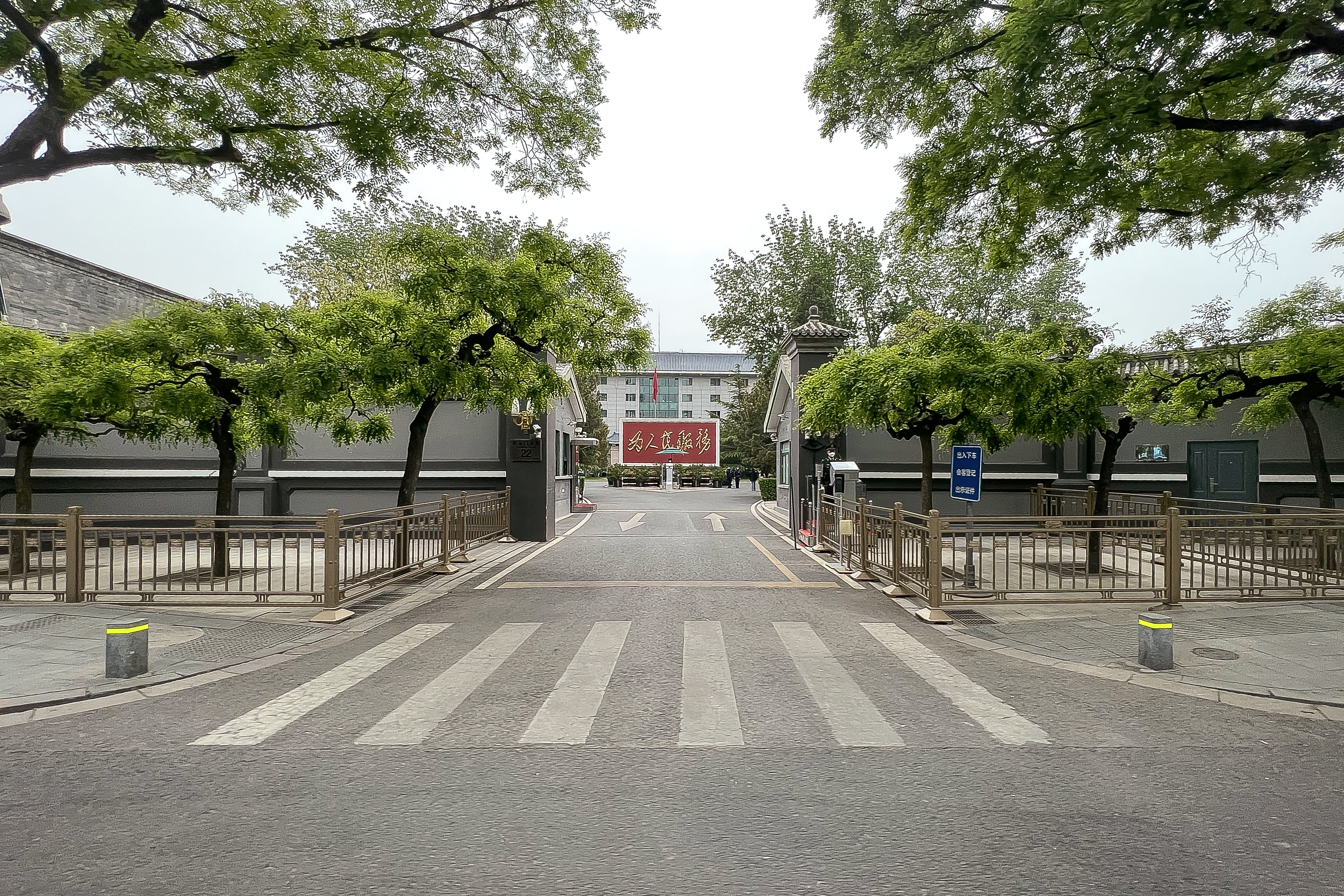
- Headquarters of the NGOA

Agency overview
- Formed: December 1950; 75 years ago
- Jurisdiction: China
- Headquarters: 22, Xi'anmen Street, Xicheng District, Beijing
- Agency executive: Wang Yonghong, Director
- Parent agency: State Council
- Website: www.ggj.gov.cn

The National Government Offices Administration is an agency directly under the State Council of People's Republic of China. It manages the office logistics for the central government and various national agencies in Beijing. It is responsible for government procurement, government employees housing, state-sponsored conferences and other matters regarding logistics.

== History ==
The administration is established in December 1950, as in Government Offices Administration of the Government Administration Council of the Central People's Government (Chinese: 中央人民政府政务院机关事务管理局). After the 1954 Constitution was passed, following a re-structuring of the government, it became the Government Offices Administration of the State Council (Chinese: 国务院机关事务管理局). In March 2013, the name is changed to National Government Offices Administration.

== Organizational Structure ==
According to the Regulations on the Functional Configuration, Internal Structure, and Staffing of the State Administration of Government Affairs, the internal departments of the SAG are at the deputy bureau level. The following institutions have been established:

=== Internal Departments ===
- General Office
- Department of Financial Management
- Department of Asset Management
- Department of Real Estate Management
- Department of Energy Conservation for Public Institutions
- Beijing Office and Comprehensive Management Department
- People's Air Defense Office of Central State Organs
- Department of Policies and Regulations (Central State Organs Housing Reform Office)
- Audit Office
- Personnel Department
- CPC Committee (Trade Union)
- Discipline Inspection Committee
- Bureau for Retired Cadres

=== Directly Affiliated Public Institutions ===
- Central Government Procurement Center for State Organs
- Central Government Housing Fund Management Center for State Organs
- Hotel Management Center
- Central Government Logistics Cadre Training Center (National Research Association of Government Affairs)
- Service Center (SAG Service Bureau)
- China Government Logistics Magazine
- Construction Service Center for Civil Servants of Central State Organs
- Vehicle Service Center
- Xishan Service Bureau
- Beidaihe Reception Service Center (SAG Beidaihe Service Bureau)
- Dongba Service Center

=== Supervised Social Organizations ===
- National Research Association of Government Affairs
- China Care for the Next Generation Working Committee

== Leadership ==
=== Directors ===
==== Government Offices Administration ====
Name	Chinese name	Took office	Left office	Ref.
Yu Xinqing	余心清	December 1950	September 1953	
Fang Zhongru	方仲如	November 1953	September 1954	
Liu Yongru	刘墉如	20 November 1954	9 March 1956	
Gao Dengbang	高登榜	9 March 1956	1966	
Li Mengfu	李梦夫	February 1973	September 1980	
Yuan Jinxiu	袁晋修	September 1980	27 March 1983	
Chang Jie	常捷	June 1983	September 1990	
Guo Ji	郭济	October 1990	May 1997	
Jiao Huancheng	焦焕成	May 1997	March 2013	

==== National Government Offices Administration ====
Name	Chinese name	Took office	Left office	Ref.
Jiao Huancheng	焦焕成	March 2013	20 October 2015	
Li Baorong	李宝荣	20 October 2015	24 June 2022	
Wang Yonghong	王永红	24 June 2022	Incumbent	
