= Jiao Huancheng =

Chinese politician

- 焦焕成

Director of the National Government Offices Administration
- In office May 1997 – October 2015
- Preceded by: Guo Ji
- Succeeded by: Li Baorong

Personal details
- Born: October 1949 (age 76–77) Xiyang County, Shanxi, China
- Party: Chinese Communist Party
- Education: Central Party School of the Chinese Communist Party

Chinese name
- Simplified Chinese: 焦焕成
- Traditional Chinese: 焦煥成
Transcriptions
Standard Mandarin
- Hanyu Pinyin: Jiāo Huànchéng

Jiao Huancheng (Chinese: 焦焕成; born October 1949) is a Chinese politician who served as director of the National Government Offices Administration from 1997 to 2015.

He was a representative of the 15th, 16th, 17th and 18th National Congress of the Chinese Communist Party. He was a member of the 16th Central Commission for Discipline Inspection. He was an alternate of the 17th Central Committee of the Chinese Communist Party and a member of the 19th Central Committee of the Chinese Communist Party. He was a member of the 12th National Committee of the Chinese People's Political Consultative Conference.

== Biography ==
Jiao was born in Xiyang County, Shanxi, in October 1949.

He was an official in Xiyang County Public Security Bureau in February 1964 and became league secretary of the county's people's commune in October of that same year. In January 1971, he became an official in the Office of the CCP Xiyang County Committee and rose to become party secretary of the county in June 1973. In November 1973, he became a secretary for Chen Yonggui, and served until February 1983.

In February 1983, he was transferred to Beijing and assigned to the National Government Offices Administration. He served as deputy director in May 1994, and three years later promoted to the director position. In July 2002, he took up the post of deputy secretary-general of the State Council which he held from 2002 to 2015, although he remained director of the National Government Offices Administration. In November 2015, he was appointed vice chairperson of the Hong Kong, Macao, Taiwan and Overseas Chinese Committee of the National Committee of the Chinese people's Political Consultative Conference.

Government offices
Preceded by Guo Ji	Director of the National Government Offices Administration; 1997–2015	Succeeded by Li Baorong
