= Wang Yonghong =

Chinese politician

- 王永红

Director of the National Government Offices Administration
- Incumbent
- Assumed office 20 June 2022
- Preceded by: Li Baorong

Personal details
- Born: June 1969 (age 57) China
- Party: Chinese Communist Party

Chinese name
- Simplified Chinese: 王永红
- Traditional Chinese: 王永紅
Transcriptions
Standard Mandarin
- Hanyu Pinyin: Wáng Yǒnghóng

Wang Yonghong (Chinese: 王永红; born June 1969) is a Chinese politician who is the current director and party branch secretary of National Government Offices Administration, in office since June 2022.

He is a representative of the 20th National Congress of the Chinese Communist Party and an alternate of the 20th Central Committee of the Chinese Communist Party.

== Biography ==
Wang was born in June 1969.

After university, he was assigned to the National Government Offices Administration, where he successively served as deputy director of the Financial Management Department, deputy director of the Logistics Reform and Integrated Management Department, director of the Training Center, director of the Financial Management Department, and director of the Dongba Service Center. He was promoted to deputy director of the National Government Offices Administration in April 2017. In June 2022, he was promoted again to become director.

Government offices
Preceded by Li Baorong	Director of the National Government Offices Administration; 2022–	Incumbent
