= Lou Jiwei =

China government official (born 1950)

- 楼继伟
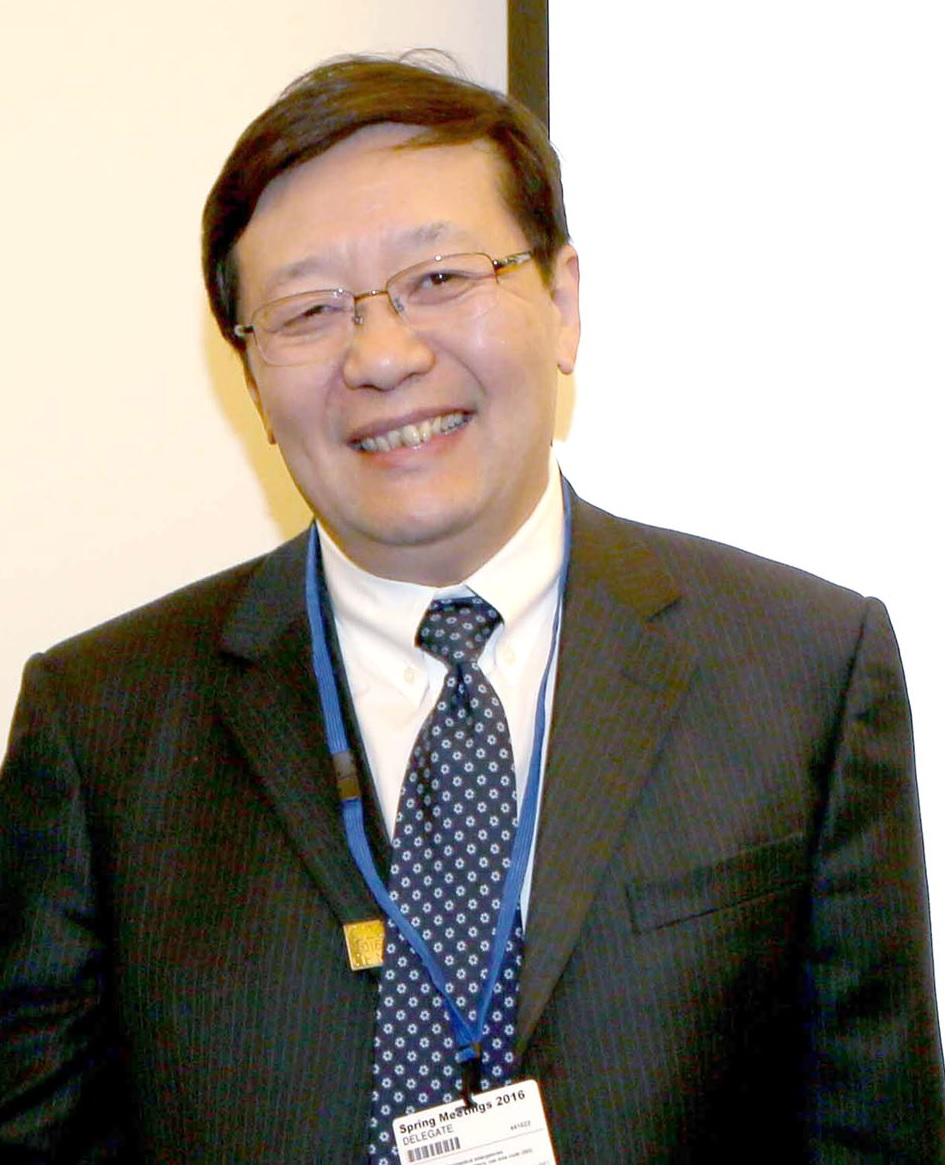
- Lou Jiwei in 2016

Chairman of the National Council for Social Security Fund
- In office November 2016 – April 2019
- Premier: Li Keqiang
- Preceded by: Xie Xuren
- Succeeded by: Liu Wei

Minister of Finance
- In office 16 March 2013 – 7 November 2016
- Premier: Li Keqiang
- Preceded by: Xie Xuren
- Succeeded by: Xiao Jie

Personal details
- Born: December 1950 (age 75) Yiwu, Zhejiang
- Party: Chinese Communist Party
- Education: Tsinghua University; Chinese Academy of Social Sciences
- Occupation: Politician

Lou Jiwei (simplified Chinese: 楼继伟; traditional Chinese: 樓繼偉; pinyin: Lóu Jìwěi; born December 1950), is a Chinese politician, and current director of the 13th CPPCC Foreign Affairs Committee. Lou was Chairman of China's National Council for Social Security Fund, Minister for Finance, Chairman of China Investment Corporation and Central Huijin Investment, Vice Minister of Finance of China and Vice-Governor of Guizhou.

== Biography ==
Lou Jiwei was born in December 1950, is from Yiwu, Zhejiang, and holds a master's degree in economics. He started working in February 1968, joined the Chinese Communist Party (CCP) in January 1973, and graduated from the Institute of Quantitative and Technological Economics of the Chinese Academy of Social Sciences with a major in economic system analysis in December 1984. He is considered outspoken.

In 2013, CCP general Secretary Xi Jinping called for the creation of state-owned investment companies to invest in key industries such as civil aviation, energy, mineral resources, nuclear power, and logistics. As Finance Minister, and with prior sovereign fund experience as the chair of China Investment Corporation and its former CEO, Lou was tasked with developing this proposal and served as lead author for the State Council's "Opinions on Reforming and Improving the State-Owned Assets Management System."

=== Timeline of positions ===
- February 1968 – February 1973: Soldier, South Sea Fleet, People's Liberation Army
- February 1973 – February 1978: Worker, Shougang Group then Beijing Research Institute of Automation for Machinery Industry
- February 1978 – February 1982: Student, B.S., Department of Computer Science and Technology, Tsinghua University
- February 1982 – February 1984: Student, M.S., Institute of Quantitative and Technological Economics, Chinese Academy of Social Sciences
- December 1984 – June 1986: Principal Staff, Finance Group, Research Office, General Office of the State Council
- June 1986 – August 1988: Deputy Director, Finance Group, Research Office, General Office of the State Council
- March 1986 – September 1986: Co-Director of Finance and Taxation Group, State Council Economic System Reform Program Design Leading Group (seconded))
- August 1988 – September 1988: Director, Cost Price Group, Institute of Finance and Trade Economics, Chinese Academy of Social Sciences
- September 1988 – February 1989: Principal Staff, Office of Economic System Restructuring, Shanghai Municipal People's Government
- February 1989 – January 1992: Deputy Director, Office of Economic System Restructuring, Shanghai Municipal People's Government
- January 1992 – September 1995: Director, Department of Macro-Control System, State Commission for Economic System Restructuring
- September 1995 – March 1998: Vice Governor and Member of Party Committee, Guizhou Provincial People's Government
- March 1998 – February 2007: Deputy Minister and Deputy Party Chief, Ministry of Finance of the People's Republic of China
- February 2007 – September 2007: Deputy Secretary-General, State Council of the People's Republic of China & Director of Preparatory Group, National Foreign Exchange Investment Corporation (China Investment Corporation)
- September 2007 – March 2013: Chair and Party Chief, China Investment Corporation and Central Huijin Investment
- March 2013 – November 2016: Minister and Party Chief, Ministry of Finance of the People's Republic of China
- November 2016 – March 2019: Chair and Member of Party Committee, National Council for Social Security Fund
- March 2019 – Present: Director, 13th Foreign Affairs Committee of the CPPCC

Lou is a member of the 16th Central Commission for Discipline Inspection, alternate member of the 17th Central Committee of the Chinese Communist Party, member of the 18th Central Committee of the Chinese Communist Party, representative of the 19th National Congress of the Chinese Communist Party, and standing member of the 13th CPPCC National Committee.

== Comments on 2021 economic data ==
On 11 December 2021, at a forum held by the China Centre for International Economic Exchanges in Beijing, Lou criticized the main economic indicators as insufficiently reflecting major economic problems, implying that recently released official warnings about economic pressures facing the country could not be explained by the indicators. In further support of his point, he mentioned his belief that among the 150 million economic entities registered as of 1 November – an increase by a half compared to a decade earlier – , at least 40 million were not active.

== Awards ==
In 2008, Time magazine considered Lou to be one of the 100 most influential people in the world. Forbes Magazine considered him to be the 30th most powerful person in the world, according to their "Powerful People 2010" list. In 2011 he was included in the 50 Most Influential ranking of Bloomberg Markets magazine. Lou was listed as twelfth on aiCIO's 2012 list of the 100 most influential institutional investors worldwide.
