= Zhou Bohua =

Chinese politician

Zhou Bohua (Chinese: 周伯华; born July 1948) is a retired politician of the People's Republic of China. He served as Governor of Hunan Province and Minister of the State Administration for Industry and Commerce (SAIC).

== Biography ==
Zhou was born in Xiangtan, Hunan province. He started working in September 1968, and joined the Chinese Communist Party (CCP) in December 1970. From June 1981 to January 1982, he was the vice director of the Zhuzhou city economics commission in Hunan. From January 1982 to August 1986, he was a researcher at the policy research office of the CCP Hunan committee. From August 1986 to June 1990, he was a standing committee member of the CCP Zhuzhou municipal committee, and the executive vice mayor of Zhuzhou. From June 1990 to January 1993, he served as the vice secretary of the CCP Zhuzhou municipal committee, vice mayor and later, mayor of Zhuzhou. From January 1993 to October 1995, he was the vice governor of Hunan Province. From October 1995 to November 2001, he was a standing committee member of the CCP Hunan committee, and vice governor of Hunan.

In November 2001, he was promoted to the position of vice secretary of the CCP Hunan committee, and vice governor of Hunan. From March 2003 to September 2006, he was the vice secretary of the CCP Hunan committee, acting governor, and later governor of Hunan Province. From 2006 to 2013, he served as Minister of the State Administration for Industry and Commerce. He was a member of the 17th Central Committee of the Chinese Communist Party.
