= Gu Mu =

Chinese revolutionary figure and politician

- 谷牧
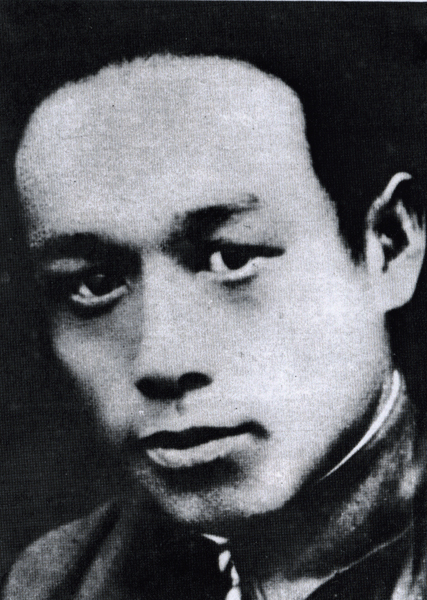
- Gu Mu in 1940

Vice Premier of China
- In office 1975–1982
- Premier: Zhou Enlai; Hua Guofeng; Zhao Ziyang

Personal details
- Born: September 1914 Rongcheng, Shandong
- Died: November 6, 2009 (aged 95) Beijing
- Party: Communist Party of China
- Children: 4 sons, 1 daughter

Gu Mu (Chinese: 谷牧; pinyin: Gǔ Mù; Wade–Giles: Ku^{3} Mu^{4}; September 1914 – November 6, 2009) was a Chinese revolutionary figure and politician, who served as the Vice Premier of China between 1975 and 1982. As one of Deng Xiaoping's main aides in charge of economic management, he played a major role in implementing Deng's reform and opening up of the 1980s. He was a key figure in the creation of Shenzhen, China's first Special Economic Zone.

== Early life and career ==
Gu Mu was born in September 1914 in a village in Rongcheng, Shandong. His birth name was Liu Jiayu (Chinese: 刘家语). Although his parents were poor peasants, he received a good education at the insistence of his grandfather.

He joined the Communist Party in July 1932 and became involved in revolutionary activities in Wendeng County, where he was attending school. He changed his name to "Gu Mu" to avoid implicating his family. In 1934, Gu went to Beijing (then known as Beiping) and became a leader of the Beiping branch of the League of Left-Wing Writers.

In 1936, Gu Mu worked in military logistics under the warlord Zhang Xueliang, and participated in the Xi'an Incident. In September 1940, Gu went back to Shandong to take on a series of progressively senior leadership positions, including Deputy Political Commissar of the First Military Region.

== People's Republic of China ==
After the founding of the People's Republic in 1949, Gu became the Party Secretary and Mayor of Jinan, the capital of Shandong, as well as Political Commissar of the Jinan Military Region. In February 1952 he was named Deputy Party Secretary and propaganda chief of Shanghai.

In 1954, Gu was transferred to Beijing as Deputy Head of the State Construction Commission.

During his service as Vice Director of the Economic Commission, Gu was assigned in 1964 to lead the Third Front Construction Support and Examination Small Group. This small group was tasked with providing resources for the Third Front campaign to develop basic industry and national defense industry in China's rugged interior in an effort to prepare for potential United States or Soviet invasion.

In 1965 he became Director of the State Construction Commission.

During the Cultural Revolution, Gu rose to be deputy to Li Xiannian and Yu Qiuli in the economic planning unit of the State Council. Gu was a part of the February Countercurrent of 1967, in which a group of military leaders criticized the Cultural Revolution, contending that it had disrupted society and threatened the leadership of the Party. Gu was later removed from his positions and suffered political persecution like many other leaders.

He returned to work in 1973 as head of the State Development and Planning Commission. In 1975, he was appointed a Vice-Premier under Zhou Enlai, and led the State Construction Commission and the Import and Export Commission of the State Council.

Between 1978 and 1988 Gu was a major part of the new reformist government under Deng Xiaoping, specializing in external relations and economic development. Gu, as Vice-Premier, led the PRC's first formal delegation to Western Europe following the Cultural Revolution. On the trip Gu visited France, Belgium, Denmark, Switzerland, and West Germany. Deng tasked Gu with making a detailed investigation, emphasizing that the delegation should learn from the advanced experience of capitalism. Deng asked that Gu and the delegation study the current stage of capitalist development and how economic work was managed. On returning to China, the Gu delegation reported to the Chinese Communist Party Politburo and strongly influenced subsequent policy to open towards foreign technology. He became a member of the Central Secretariat in 1980, and State Councilor in May 1982. As one of Deng Xiaoping's chief aides in charge of economic management, he played a major role in implementing Deng's reform and opening up and China's opening to the world. He was a key figure in the creation of Shenzhen, China's first Special Economic Zone.

In 1988, Gu became a vice-chairman of the Chinese People's Political Consultative Conference, a mostly ceremonial post. He retired in 1993, and left public life.

Gu Mu died on November 6, 2009, at the age of 95. He was officially eulogized as a "long-tested and loyal warrior of the Communist cause, a proletariat revolutionary, an outstanding leader in the field of economic development". Top Chinese leaders, including Hu Jintao and Jiang Zemin attended his funeral.

== Family ==
Gu Mu had four sons: Liu Nianyuan (刘念远), Liu Huiyuan (刘会远), Liu Liyuan (刘历远), Liu Xianyuan (刘宪远), and a daughter, Liu Yanyuan (刘燕远). They are all surnamed "Liu" in accordance with Gu's real surname. Liu Nianyuan has retired as a major general of the People's Liberation Army. Liu Liyuan was imprisoned during the Cultural Revolution for two years, together with Ye Jianying's son Ye Xuanping and son-in-law Zou Jiahua, Bo Yibo's three sons including Bo Xilai, and the sons of He Long.

== Awards ==
- Japan:
  - Grand Cordon of the Order of the Rising Sun (30 June 2008)
