= National Council for Social Security Fund =

Chinese government social security fund

- 全国社会保障基金理事会
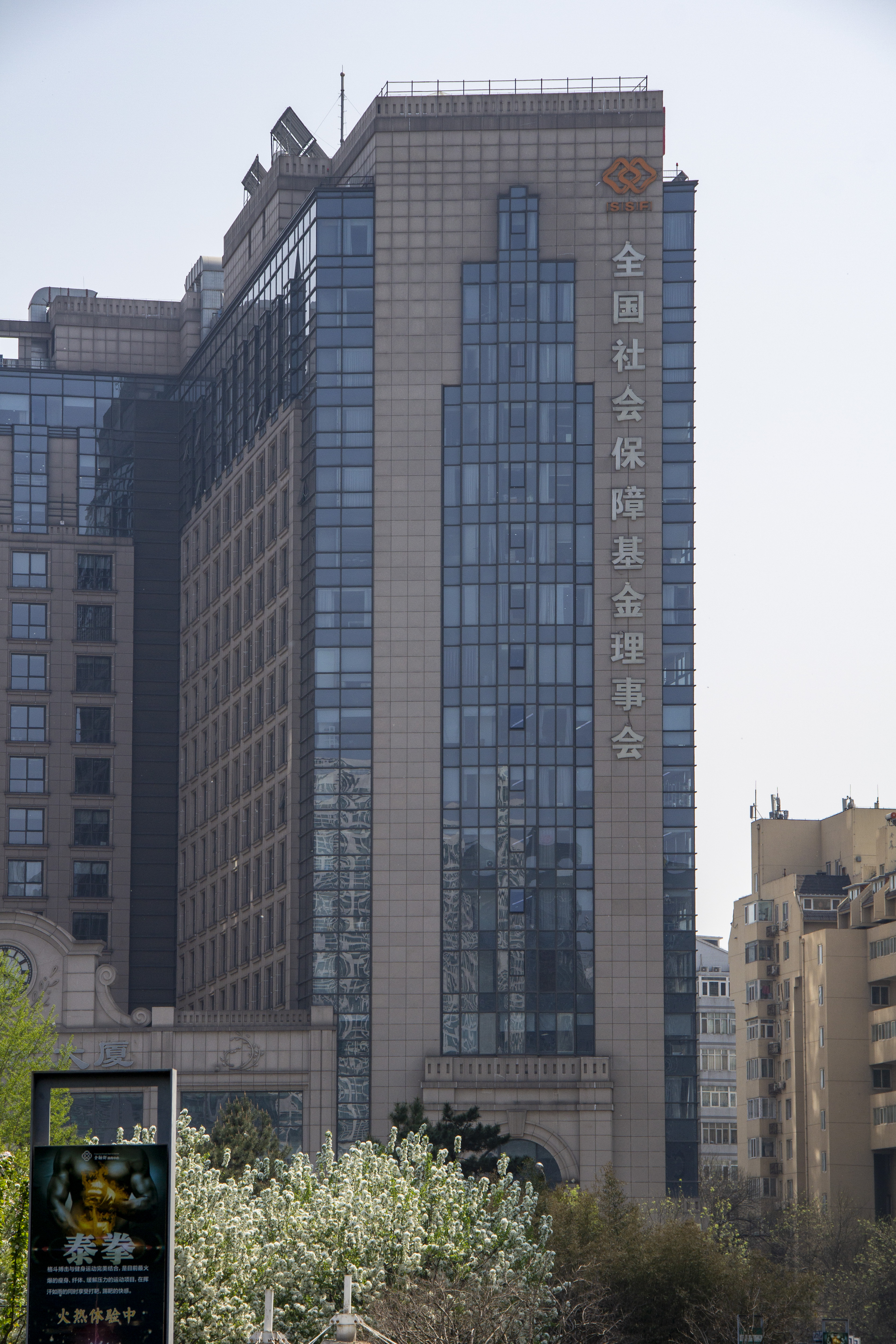

Agency overview
- Formed: 2000
- Jurisdiction: China
- Headquarters: Beijing, China
- Agency executives: Ding Xuedong, party secretary; Liu Wei, chair; Wu Jianli, vice chair; Jin Luo, vice chair; Wang Wenling, vice chair
- Website: ssf.gov.cn

The National Council for Social Security Fund (SSF) is a public institution under the Ministry of Finance of China. It is responsible for the investment and operation of the National Social Security Fund.

== History ==
On 1 August 2000, the Central Committee of CPC and the State Council decided to establish National Social Security Fund (NSSF), and set up the National Council for Social Security Fund (SSF) for managing and operating the NSSF's assets.

NSSF aims to be a solution to the problem of aging and serves as a strategic reserve fund accumulated by the central government to support future social security expenditures and other social security needs.

== Investment policy and scope ==
Under relevant provisions of the Interim Management Measures on the Investments of the National Social Security Fund, the Interim Management Measures on the Overseas Investments of the National Social Security Fund, the NSSF are permitted to invest in the following products:

1. Domestic investments: bank deposits, treasury bonds, financial bonds, corporate bonds, securitized products, securities investment funds, stocks, industrial investments, industrial investment funds and trust investments.
1. Overseas investments: bank deposits, foreign treasury bonds, bonds of international financial organizations, bonds of foreign entities, foreign corporate bonds, overseas bonds issued by the Chinese government or Chinese enterprises, money market products such as banking drafts and large CDs, stocks, funds, derivative instruments such as swaps and futures, and such other investment products or instruments jointly approved by the Ministry of Treasury and the Ministry of Labor and Social Security.

== Size of the fund and asset allocation ==
The fund's assets under management expanded by 13% a year from 2010 to 2020. As of 2026, the National Social Security Fund had approximately $503 billion of assets under management. It is the largest pension fund in China.

== Departments ==
The NCSSF's departments include:

- General Office
- Finance and Accounting
- Investment
- Equity Management
- Legal Compliance
- Information and Research
- Human Resources
