= Ministry of Finance (China) =

Chinese government agency managing finance

Ministry of Finance of the People's Republic of China
- 中华人民共和国财政部; Zhōnghuá Rénmín Gònghéguó Cáizhèngbù
- Logo of the Ministry of Finance

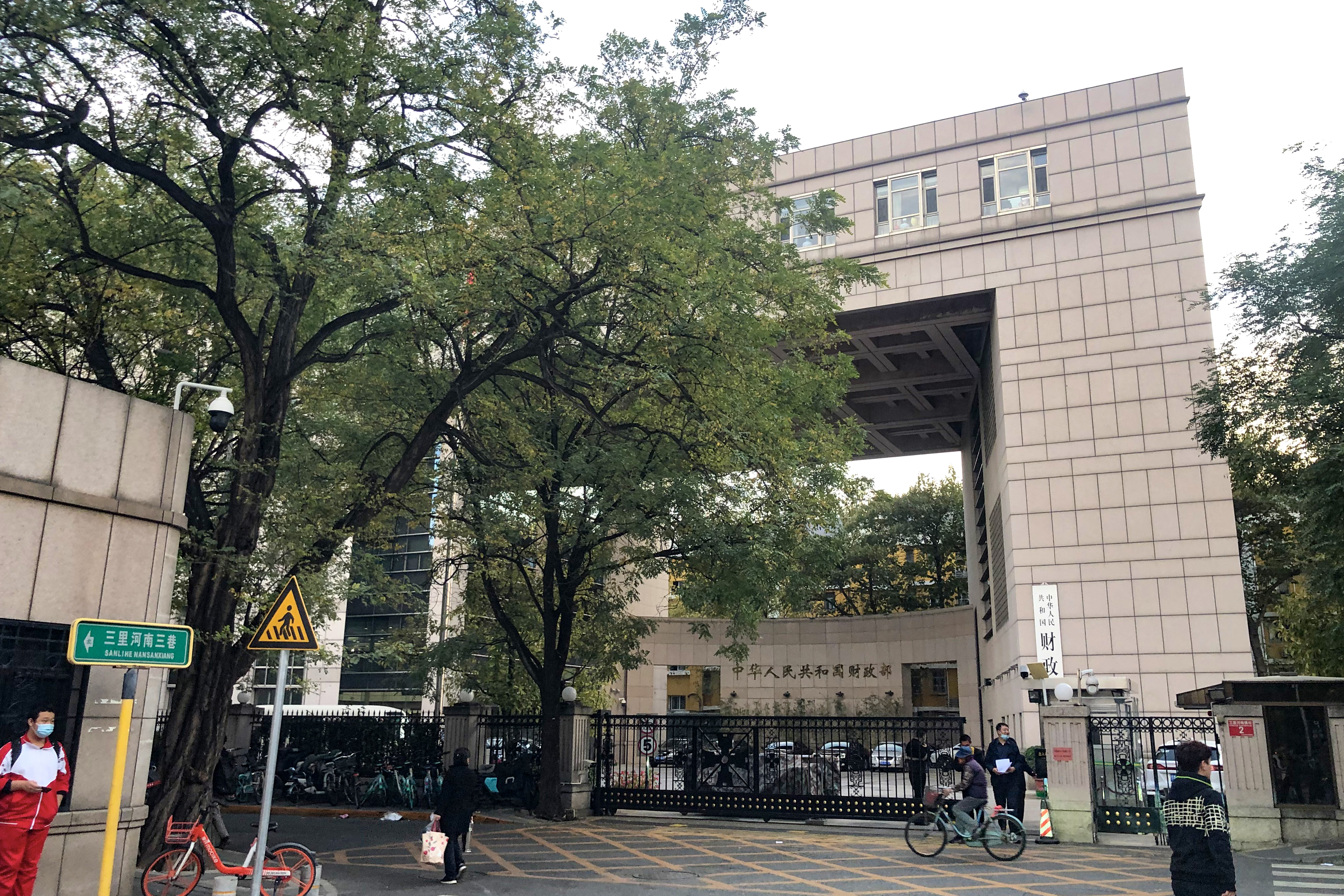
- Headquarters of the Ministry of Finance

Agency overview
- Formed: 1949; 77 years ago
- Type: Constituent Department of the State Council (cabinet-level executive department)
- Jurisdiction: Government of China
- Headquarters: Beijing
- Minister responsible: Lan Fo'an, Minister of Finance
- Deputy Ministers responsible: Liao Min; Zhu Zhongming; Wang Dongwei
- Agency executives: Yang Guozhong, Leader of Discipline and Inspection & Supervision Team; Liu Wei, Chairman of National Council for Social Security Fund
- Parent agency: State Council
- Website: www.mof.gov.cn

Ministry of Finance
- Simplified Chinese: 中华人民共和国财政部
Transcriptions
Standard Mandarin
- Hanyu Pinyin: Zhōnghuá Rénmín Gònghéguó Cáizhèngbù
- IPA: [tsʰǎɪ ʈʂə̂ŋ pû]

The Ministry of Finance of the People's Republic of China is the constituent department of the State Council of the People's Republic of China which administers macroeconomic policies and the annual budget. It also handles fiscal policy, economic regulations and government expenditure for the state. The ministry also records and publishes annual macroeconomic data on China's economy. This includes information such as previous economic growth rates in China, central government debt and borrowing and many other indicators regarding the economy of mainland China.

The Ministry of Finance's remit is smaller than its counterparts in many other states. Macroeconomic management is primarily handled by the National Development and Reform Commission (NDRC). State-owned industries are the responsibility of the State-owned Assets Supervision and Administration Commission, and there are separate regulators for banking, insurance and securities. It also does not handle regulation of the money markets or interest rates. These, together with other aspects of monetary policy, are governed by the People's Bank of China (PBC), mainland China's central bank. The Ministry, NDRC and PBC are equal in status, with their political heads all sitting on the State Council.

== History ==
The Ministry of Finance of the People's Republic of China was formerly known as the Ministry of Finance of the Central People's Government, which was established on October 1,1949. In September 1954, the First Session of the First National People's Congress was held in Beijing, at which the Constitution of the People's Republic of China and the Organic Law of the State Council were adopted. The former Ministry of Finance of the Central People's Government was transformed into the Ministry of Finance of the People's Republic of China, which took over the related work and became a constituent department of the State Council.

On 1 July 1967, during the Cultural Revolution, the Central Committee of the Chinese Communist Party, the State Council and the Central Military Commission decided to implement military rule over the ministry; the Director of the Military Control Commission Yin Chengzhen became the head of the ministry. In 1969, the State Council approved the consolidation of PBC's headquarters as a bureau within the Ministry of Finance. Local PBC branches were merged into local government finance departments. The Military Control Commission was replaced with a Revolutionary Committee on 22 June 1970.

The ministry was reorganized and restored its ministerial system in January 1975. In 1978, the PBC was separated from the Ministry of Finance.

The Ministry held China's first bond auction in 1996.

In 2007, the Ministry increased its degree of supervision over Central Huijin.

In 2009, the Ministry converted its ownership of $200 billion of China Investment Corporation's debt into equity, a result which relieved CIC of interest payments on the special treasury bonds that had initially capitalized it and instead resulted in CIC paying an annual dividend to the Ministry.

The Ministry has sought to implement property taxes since the early 2010s, but has been opposed on this issue by the National People's Congress and many local governments. As of at least early 2024, property taxes have been kept off the legislative agenda.

The Ministry is among the state entities which contribute to the China Integrated Circuit Industry Investment Fund, which was established in an effort to decrease China's reliance on foreign semiconductor companies. The fund was established in 2014.

In 2015, the Ministry of Finance allocated 2 billion RMB to establish e-commerce centers in some of the least developed areas of rural China. This approach has since inspired similar strategies in Egypt, India, and Vietnam.

In November 2025, the Ministry of Finance established a new debt management department.

== Role ==
During the pre-Reform period of centrally planned public finance, capitalization of industrial and infrastructure projects has handled through public expenditure. The State Planning Commission designated projects and the Ministry allocated revenue to them.

The main functions of the Ministry is to carry out the following duties of the state:

Number	Main Function	Description
1.	Economic and public finance policies	Formulating and implementing strategies, policies and guidelines for economic development, public finance for government revenue sharing between the central and provincial governments.
2.	Administration of public finance and external debt	Draft laws and regulations on public finance, financial, accounting management, external finance and debts.
3.	Annual budget for Central People's Government	Preparing the annual budget of the central government, priority spending, balancing the budget
4.	Revenue and Tax legislation reforms	Proposing tax legislation plans - reviewing proposals on tax legislation and tax revenue regulations.
5.	Central People's Government expendituree	Administering the central expenditures - procurement, expenses
6.	Government Revenue distribution	Formulating and implementing the policy of distribution between the state and government owned enterprises
7.	Economic Development Expenditure	Administering the central government expenditures for economic development, the appropriation for central government financed projects, and funds for technological innovation
8.	Social Security Expenditure	Managing the social security expenditures from the central government; formulating the accounting management rules on social security funds; monitoring the utilization of the social security funds.
9.	Domestic government debts	Formulating and implementing policies, rules and regulations on managing government's domestic debts; treasury bond issuance; formulating policies, rules and regulations on managing government's external debts
10.	Accounting Regulations	Formulating and implementing accounting regulations - for government and private corporations and promoting accountability and transparency.
11.	Fiscal and Tax Policies	Monitoring the implementation of fiscal and tax policies - laws and regulations, examining problems with the system and making changes.
12.	Fiscal research and education	Research into fiscal policy and education resources to the wider community.
13.	Other Duties as Directed	Undertaking other assignments of the State Council.

The Ministry of Finance in involved the foreign aid process through making China's donations to multilateral financial institutions.

== Organizational structure ==
Organizational structure obtained from the Ministry of Finance website:

- General Office
- Policy & Programme Department
- Legal Department
- Tax Policy Department
- Tariff Policy Department
- Budget Department
- Treasury Department
- National Defense Department
- Administrative & Law Enforcement Department
- Education, Science & Culture Department
- Economic Construction Department
- Agriculture Department
- Social Security Department
- State Equity & Corporate Finance Department
- Finance Department
- Debt Management Department
- International Department
- Accounting Regulatory Department
- Supervision Department
- State Rural Development Office
- Personnel & Education Department

== Leadership ==
All of the leaders are members of the Ministry's Communist Party Committee, with Lan Fo'an as its secretary.

Position	Name of Person
Minister	Lan Fo'an
Head of the Central Commission for Discipline Inspection's supervisory group	Yang Guozhong
Vice Minister	Liao Min
Vice Minister	Wang Dongwei
Vice Minister	Guo Tingting
National Council for Social Security Fund (NCSSF) Director General	Liu Wei
Assistant Minister	Song Qichao
Assistant Minister	Shu Huihao

== As shareholder ==
The MOF also acted as the controlling shareholder for a number of financial service companies of China, such as People's Insurance Company of China, China Life Insurance Group (parent of China Life), China Taiping Insurance Group (parent of China Taiping Insurance Holdings), etc. The Ministry also owned Industrial and Commercial Bank of China, the Agricultural Bank of China, the Bank of Communications, China Great Wall Asset Management, China Cinda Asset Management, China Orient Asset Management, China Huarong Asset Management and China Re, etc.

MOF also owned China Railway, China Tobacco and CITIC Group.

== See also ==
- Chinese financial system
- Taxation in China
- People's Bank of China
- Ministries of the People's Republic of China
