= Insurance industry in China =

National industry

The Chinese insurance industry has experienced rapid expansion over the past decade.

In addition to steadily increasing demand, two major supply-side trends have encouraged the development of the industry: (1) under the World Trade Organization (WTO) framework, the Chinese government lowered entry barriers to foreign insurers, allowing them to establish joint-venture insurance firms in China; and (2) domestic insurers strengthened themselves through initial public offerings and other market developments. (For example, China Life Insurance at one point became the second largest insurance company in the world in terms of market capitalization although the value has kept declining since the stock market peak of 2008.)

As of 2007, China had 100 insurance companies, 59 of which are domestic-funded and the rest 41 are foreign-funded. And five Chinese insurance companies including the People's Insurance Company of China, China Life Insurance, Ping An Insurance Company of China, China Insurance International Holdings Co., Ltd. (CIIH) and China Pacific Insurance have listed at home and abroad.

China Life Insurance had about a 50% share of the life insurance market; Ping An Life Insurance and Ping An Property Insurance share 16% and 12% of corresponding insurance markets, respectively ranking 2nd and 3rd.

Chinese insurers namely China Insurance International Holdings, China Life Insurance, Ping An Insurance, People's Insurance Company of China and China Pacific Insurance were the first wave of insurers to go public. In December 2011, New China Life began a second wave of IPOs for smaller tier 2 insurers.

In Jan-May 2007, the increased insurance assets reached RMB 450 billion, without calculation the value-added of substantive financial assets. At present, the gross assets of China Life Insurance have outnumbered RMB 1 trillion. And the total capital of the whole insurance industry has exceeded RMB 200 billion, 5.6 times that of 2002.

During the first three quarters of 2009 China's insurance companies had generated profits 36.9 billion RMB of which the seven largest insurers accounted for 90% of these profits.

In November 2024, the China Financial Regulatory Administration issued the "Notice on Improving Financial Reinsurance Supervision" document, which put forward rectification requirements for China's insurance industry. The document requires insurance companies to improve their solvency and sets an improvement limit of 30%.

Despite all this growth the industry is still considered in its infancy stage when looking at China's insurance penetration compared to its peers in the rest of Greater China and Asia.

== Organizations ==
Insurance Association of China (IAC)

The IAC represents the collective interests of China's insurance industry. The Association speaks out on issues of common interest; helps to inform and participate in debates on public policy issues; and also acts as an advocate for high standards of customer service in the insurance industry. IAC has four working committees which are Life Insurance Working Committee, General Insurance Working Committee, Insurance Agency & Broker Working Committee, Actuarial Working Committee.

The Insurance Institute of China (IIC)

The IIC is the nationwide academic association for research and policy analysis in insurance industry. It offers two publications: Insurance Information (Biweekly) and Insurance Studies (Monthly)

== List ==
This is an incomplete list of insurance companies in China.

- China Taiping Insurance Holdings (formerly China Insurance International Holdings)
- China Life Insurance Company
- China Pacific Insurance Company
- People's Insurance Company of China (including PICC Property and Casualty)
- Ping An Insurance
- China Re
- Minsheng Life Insurance
- New China Life Insurance
- Anbang
- Huaxia Life Insurance
- Taikang Life Insurance
- Tianan Insurance

== See also ==
- List of insurance companies in Hong Kong
- Healthcare in China
