= China Insurance =

China Insurance may refer to:

- People's Insurance Company of China, the only insurance company of Mainland China before the 1980s
- China Taiping Insurance Group Limited, formerly China Insurance Company, Limited, a former overseas subsidiary of People's Insurance Company of China, now a separate conglomerate
  - China Taiping Insurance Holdings, formerly China Insurance International Holdings, a subsidiary of China Taiping Insurance Group Limited, a listed company

== See also ==
- China Life Insurance Company
- Insurance industry in China
- China Insurance Regulatory Commission
