= China Great Wall Asset Management =

Chinese State-owned asset management company

China Great Wall Asset Management Co., Ltd.
- Native name: 中国长城资产管理股份有限公司
- Company type: State-owned enterprise
- Industry: Financial services
- Founded: 2 November 1999; 26 years ago
- Headquarters: Beijing, China
- Key people: Li Junfeng (President)
- Operating income: ▼CN¥22.7 billion (2021)
- Net income: ▼CN¥−8.2 billion (2021)
- Total assets: ▲CN¥642.9 billion (2021)
- Total equity: ▲CN¥64.7 billion (2021)
- Parent: Ministry of Finance; National Council for Social Security Fund; China Life Insurance Company
- Subsidiaries: Great Wall Pan Asia Holdings
- Website: www.gwamcc.com

China Great Wall Asset Management Co., Ltd. is a Chinese distressed asset management company headquartered in Beijing. It is a state-owned enterprise. The company is an asset management company that originated as a bad bank for the Agricultural Bank of China. It was one of the four asset management companies that the Government of China established in 1999 in response to the 1997 Asian financial crisis.

== Background ==
On 2 November 1999, Great Wall was established by the Ministry of Finance to manage and process the non-performing loans of Agricultural Bank of China.

In August 2016, Great Wall acquired Armada Holdings from Kerry Media for HK$1.57 billion in cash. The company was renamed to Great Wall Pan Asia Holdings.

In December 2015, Great Wall expressed interest in holding an initial public offering on the Hong Kong Stock Exchange. However to this date, it has not progressed with the listing.

On 11 December 2016, Great Wall underwent restructuring to become a joint-stock company.

In November 2017, Great Wall was part of a consortium that paid HK$23 billion to buy 17 shopping malls in Hong Kong from Link REIT.

In July 2018, Great Wall received a capital injection of 12 billion yuan from National Council for Social Security Fund, two subsidiaries of China Re and China Life Insurance Company.

In January 2021, Great Wall was fined 46.9 million yuan by the China Banking and Insurance Regulatory Commission for illegally providing external guarantees, inflating book profits and issuing too many performance awards.

In April 2021, Great Wall put its 70% of its stake in Changsheng Life Insurance up for sale on the Shanghai United Assets and Equity Exchange. It had previously acquired the company in September 2009.

In June 2022, Great Wall missed a second deadline to publish its 2021 annual report after it missed its original deadline on 30 April.

In January 2024, Xinhua News Agency released a report stating there was a proposal to merge Great Wall, China Cinda Asset Management and China Orient Asset Management with China Investment Corporation. However this report was later removed.
