= C-ROSS =

Chinese insurance regulatory framework

C-ROSS, short for China Risk-Oriented Solvency System, is a regulatory framework created by the China Insurance Regulatory Commission (CIRC) that governs the insurance industry in China. It was implemented in 2016.

In 2022 C-ROSS II was implemented, strengthening the provisions of the existing C-ROSS, particularly around the areas of risk metrics for morbidity and interest rates.
