= Minsheng =

Minsheng (Chinese: 民生; pinyin: Mínshēng) is a Chinese word for "the people's wealth-fare". The word appeared in ancient texts such as the Zuo Zhuan, but now is more notably known as one of the Three Principles of the People. It may also refer to:

== Companies ==
- China Minsheng Bank, a Chinese commercial bank
  - Minsheng Bank Building
- Minsheng Life Insurance, a Chinese life insurance company
- China Minsheng Trust, a Chinese trust and investment management company, subsidiary of Oceanwide Holdings
- Minsheng Securities, a Chinese investment bank and brokerage firm, subsidiary of Oceanwide Holdings
- Minsheng Holdings, A Chinese publicly traded company, subsidiary of Oceanwide Group

== See also ==
- Socialist ideology of the Kuomintang
