= Ming An Holdings =

Ming An (Holdings) Company Limited
- Company type: Public
- Traded as: SEHK:1389
- Industry: Insurance
- Predecessor: Ming An Insurance
Founded
1947 in Hong Kong	(predecessor)
2006 in Caymans and HK	(as holding company and listed company)
- Founder: China Insurance Company; Cheung Kong Holdings
- Defunct: 2009 (privatization)
Headquarters
Grand Cayman, Cayman Islands	(registered office)
Hong Kong, China	(de facto)
- Area served: Hong Kong; Mainland China
Owner
China Insurance Company
Cheung Kong Holdings
- Parent: China Insurance Company
- Subsidiaries: Ming An Insurance (HK); Ming An Insurance (China)

Chinese name
- Traditional Chinese: 民安（控股）有限公司
Transcriptions
- Website: www.mahcl.com

Ming An (Holdings) Company Limited was a listed holding company of Hong Kong. Through subsidiaries, It provides general insurance in Hong Kong and in mainland China. It provides motor insurance, property insurance, employee compensation, marine insurance, accident insurance and health insurance.

== History ==
=== Ming An Insurance ===
Ming An Insurance (HK) was first established in 1947 in Hong Kong.

It was nationalized after the establishment of the People's Republic of China in 1949. Despite all mainland China insurers were merged into People's Insurance Company of China (PICC), Ming An Insurance was kept as a "window company" of the Chinese Government in the British Hong Kong, a British colony until 30 June 1997. Fellow insurers Taiping Insurance Company and China Insurance Company also survived as overseas subsidiaries of PICC.

In 1999, PICC was split into smaller insurer groups, which Ming An Insurance belonged to China Insurance Company. An intermediate holding company, The Ming An (Holdings) Company Limited was incorporated in 2006 in the Cayman Islands. It became a listed company on the Stock Exchange of Hong Kong in the same year.

As of 2007, Ming An Insurance had a market share of 3.9% in general insurance and ranked the fourth; the third was Bank of China Insurance (4.9%).

=== Ming An Holdings ===
Ming An (Holdings) was a listed company that incorporated on 5 September 2006. Before it became a listed company, the parent company and largest shareholder was China Insurance HK (Holdings), which was also the parent company of fellow listed company China Insurance International Holdings (CIIH). The second largest shareholder was Cheung Kong Holdings, which acquired 29% stake of Ming An Insurance (HK) in July 2006. In the eve of the listing and group re-organization, China Insurance HK (Holdings) owned 66.1% shares of Ming An (Holdings), followed by Cheung Kong (29%). The listed company CIIH also owned 4.9%. In turn, Ming An (Holdings) 100% owned Ming An Insurance (HK) and Ming An Insurance (HK) 100% owned Ming An Insurance (China).

In 2009 the listed company was privatized by CIIH, which known as China Taiping Insurance Holdings since the same year. The subsidiary, Ming An Insurance (HK), was also renamed to China Taiping Insurance (HK) Company Limited.
