= List of accidents and incidents involving Robert Mugabe's motorcade =

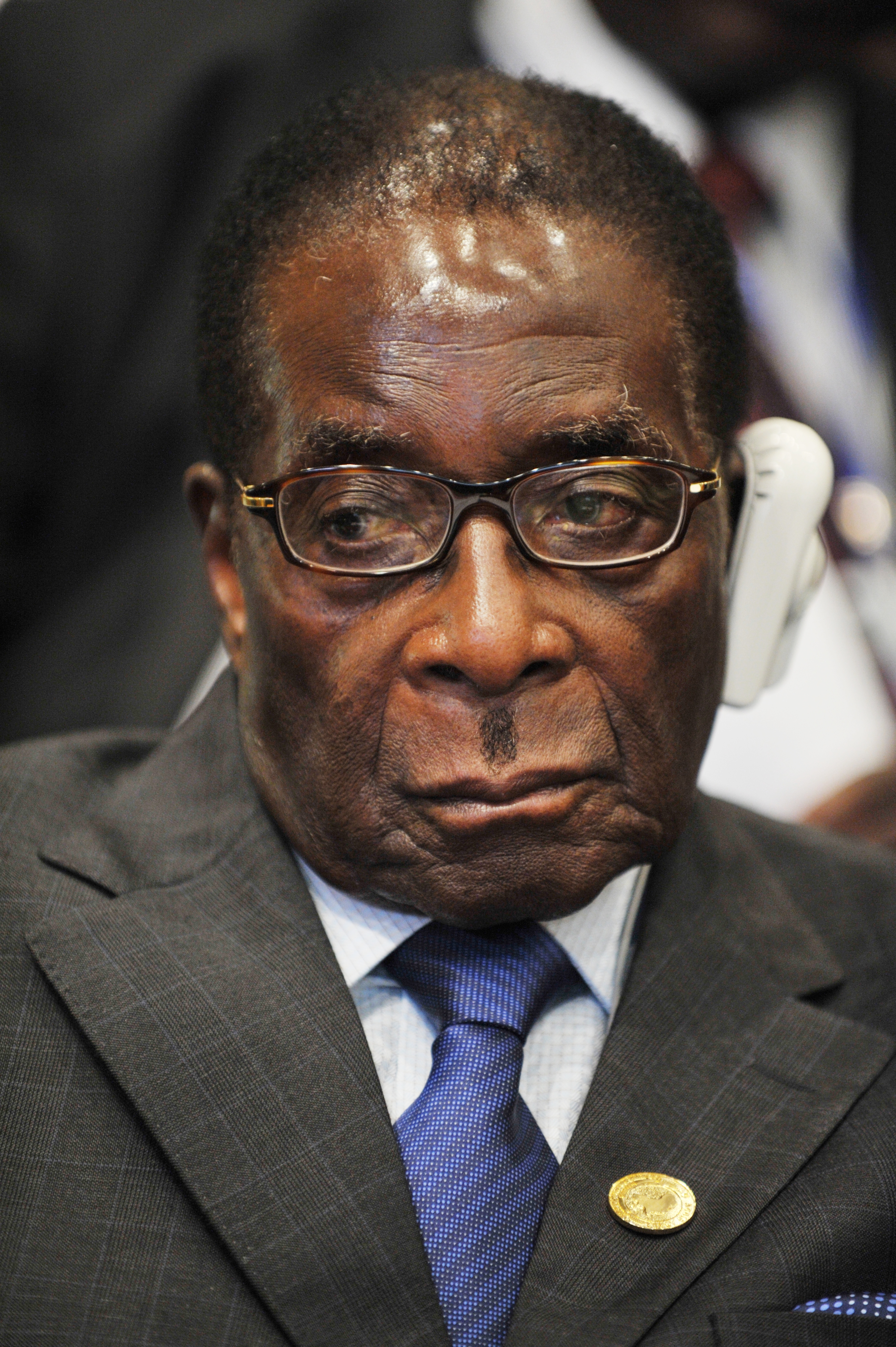
Mugabe in 2009

Robert Mugabe, the president of Zimbabwe from 1987 to 2017, and the prime minister from 1980 to 1987, often travelled via motorcade. His motorcade was known for its high speeds and involvement in numerous fatal accidents. It was nicknamed "Bob Mugabe and the Wailers", a reference to Bob Marley and the Wailers, for blasting loud sirens and flashing bright lights upon approach.

== Background ==
It is common for African heads of state to travel in lavish and heavily armored motorcades, though Mugabe's was exceptionally long even by African standards. Mugabe often travelled with "half a dozen motorbikes, an ambulance, two truckloads of soldiers and about a dozen other mainly luxury vehicles," according to the BBC. Other compositions have been given. When pressed about costs, the presidential office stated that security arrangements were "not for public consumption." This was in contrast to his predecessor, the Prime Minister of Rhodesia, Ian Smith, usually driving himself in a Peugeot.

After assuming national leadership in 1980, Mugabe began expanding his motorcade. Mugabe, who was targeted for assassination in the 1980s, ordered his motorcade to be heavily fortified against potential assassins or other threats. The Mail & Guardian reported that the motorcade often included semiautomatic and machine guns.

Mugabe's movements often compelled traffic to a standstill. Since 2002, it has been against the law to obstruct the presidential motorcade or to "make offensive gestures or statements about it," which includes pointing. The British government warned its citizens against driving while the president passed, noting that police often assaulted those who do not stop fast enough. In some cases, motorists were shot at for not stopping in time.

Mugabe's motorcade was known for speeding on a regular basis and killing people. Ordinary Zimbabweans nicknamed the motorcade Bob Mugabe and the Wailers, a reference to Bob Marley and the Wailers, for blasting loud sirens and flashing bright lights upon approach. The motorcade also drew the ire of Nelson Mandela. In a television interview, Mandela recounted explaining to his grandchild why he (Mandela) did not have a motorcade: "Oh, no, we don't do that in South Africa, we leave that kind of thing to Mr. Mugabe."

In November 2017, Mugabe was deposed in a coup d'etat. Preparing to succeed Mugabe, new leader Emmerson Mnangagwa paraded around Harare in a motorcade of similar size to Mugabe's.

== List of accidents and incidents resulting in injury or death ==
Accidents and incidents resulting in injury or death
Year	Date	Location	Description
1980	February 10	Fort Victoria	An unknown party detonated 80 pounds (35 kg) of remote-controlled explosives under then-guerilla leader Robert Mugabe's convoy in Southern Rhodesia. Mugabe was unharmed, though five members of the convoy were taken to hospital for "minor injuries and shock." The explosion carved out a large crater. It was the second attempt on Mugabe's life within days, as an assassin had lobbed a grenade at his home earlier.
c. 2003	"recently" as of January 16	unspecified, near a fuel queue	Motorists "hooted and jeered" at Mugabe's passing motorcade, and were subsequently beaten by a truckload of troopers.
2005	unspecified, before June 25	near "the palace"	During a state visit by Tanzanian president Benjamin Mkapa, a motorist got too close to Mugabe's motorcade, which was hosting Mkapa. Although the motorist was not interfering with the operation of the motorcade, he was beaten by police and dragged away.
2007	c. December 2	Harare	A Mazda 323 weaved between guards and struck a security vehicle in Mugabe's motorcade. Both men in the vehicle died at the scene. Mugabe himself was unhurt and proceeded on his journey to the airport. Journalist Moses Moyo contacted a source, who informed him that many within the Central Intelligence Organisation believed that it was a vehicular ramming attack with the aim of killing Mugabe. Government officials refused to comment on the incident.
2012	June 6	Zvimba District	A homeless man was struck and killed by a speeding outrider in Mugabe's motorcade. The outrider himself was launched into the air, according to an eyewitness. Despite containing an ambulance, the motorcade did not pause. Press reports indicated that the homeless man had been left to die of his injuries. Presidential spokesperson George Charamba denied this, stating that the homeless man had been killed instantly.
2012	June 6	Zvimba District	Later on June 6, a Land Cruiser's tire exploded. The Guardian reported that it killed two troopers in Mugabe's motorcade and injured another two. BBC reported two deaths and seven injuries. The International Business Times and The New York Times only reported one death and did not mention any injuries.
2012	June 17	Zvimba District	The lead car in Mugabe's motorcade struck a passenger bus, killing one passenger and injuring a total of fifteen people. National police spokesman Wayne Bvudzijena blamed the driver of the minibus, stating that he failed to heed the motorcade's sirens. Another police spokesman specializing in VIP protection, Martin Mbokochena, blamed the incident on "some unruly elements in society who want to disturb." Activist network Kubatana mocked Mugabe's motorcade for getting into three accidents in only two weeks.
2012	October 3	Borrowdale, Harare	A motorcade outrider hit a truck and was burned to death. Cell phone footage showed passersby unsuccessfully attempting to save him using fire extinguishers. Mugabe's motorcade sped away but left behind the ambulance that was part of the motorcade. Eyewitnesses reported that the ambulance driver did not help with the rescue efforts in any way. The Scotsman noted that "some reports" stated that this was the thirteenth motorcade outrider to die since Mugabe came to power.
2013	March 1	Harare	A Red Cross vehicle collided with a motorcade outrider, injuring two. A witness reported that the Red Cross vehicle did not see the motorcade coming.
2017	July 15	Harare International Airport	First Lady Grace Mugabe injured her ankle when climbing into a waiting car; the driver accelerated before she was fully in the vehicle and dragged her for a few metres. She was taken to a hospital and discharged the same day.
2017	July 15	near Harare International Airport	Shortly after the previous incident, a motorcade outrider was seriously injured. An anonymous source reported that he was seriously bruised and had likely rolled over several times. The circumstances were not clear. He was abandoned by the motorcade. Spokesperson Charamba stated that he did not know whether he survived or not, and segued into Grace Mugabe's lack of serious injury.

== See also ==
- Wabenzi, a slang term for corrupt government officials with luxury cars
