= Black diamond (racial term) =

South African term for wealthy black people

Black diamond is a term used pejoratively to refer to a member of the black middle class in contemporary South Africa. The term was not originally derogatory. It was coined by TNS Research Surveys (Pty) Ltd and the UCT Unilever Institute to refer to members of South Africa's fast-growing, affluent and influential black community. However, the term evolved negative connotations and is now used almost exclusively as a pejorative.

== See also ==
- Black Turks
- Wabenzi
