= China Taiping Insurance Holdings =

Chinese insurance company

China Taiping Insurance Holdings Company Limited
- Formerly: China Insurance International Holdings Company Limited
- Type: Public
- Traded as: SEHK: 966
- ISIN: HK0000055878
- Industry: Financial services
- Predecessor: Taiping Insurance Company, Limited
Founded
1929 in Shanghai	(predecessor)
2000	(incorporated as a holding company)
- Headquarters: Hong Kong, China
- Area served: Mainland China; Hong Kong; Macau; Singapore; Indonesia; United Kingdom; etc.
- Services: life insurance; general insurance; reinsurance; asset management; etc.
- Revenue: ▲HK$213,662 million (2018)
- Net income: ▲HK$6,884 million (2018)
- Total assets: ▲HK$752,101 million (2018)
- Total equity: ▼HK$61,023 million (2018)
- Owner: China Taiping Insurance Group (56.64%)
- Number of employees: ▼75,341 (2018)
- Parent: China Taiping Insurance Group
Subsidiaries
Taiping Reinsurance	(100%)
Taiping Reinsurance (China)	(100%)
Taiping Reinsurance Broker	(100%)
Taiping Life Insurance	(75.10%)
Taiping Life Insurance (HK)	(100%)
Taiping General Insurance	(100%)
Taiping Insurance (HK)	(100%)
Taiping Pension	(100%)
Taiping Asset Management	(100%)
Taiping Fund Management	(66.40%)
Taiping Financial Holdings	(100%)
Taiping Securities (HK)	(100%)
etc.

Chinese name
- Traditional Chinese: 中國太平保險控股有限公司
- Simplified Chinese: 中国太平保险控股有限公司
Transcriptions

short name
- Traditional Chinese: 中國太平
- Simplified Chinese: 中国太平
Transcriptions

former name
- Traditional Chinese: 中保國際控股有限公司
- Simplified Chinese: 中保国际控股有限公司
Transcriptions
- Website: www.ctih.cntaiping.com
- Footnotes in consolidated financial statement; net profit and equity excluding minority interest and perpetual issued by the company

China Taiping Insurance Holdings Company Limited (CTIH) formerly China Insurance International Holdings Company Limited (CIIH), is a Chinese insurance conglomerate. The company has strong Chinese Central Government background despite being incorporated in Hong Kong. It is considered as a red chip company.

== Businesses ==
The group's major businesses are reinsurance, life insurance, property and casualty insurance, asset management, reinsurance brokerage, pension management, real estate manager, etc.

As of 2018 financial year, most of the profit of the listed company came from life insurance (HK$6.2 billion, compare to 8.8 billion profit from all operations; both figures including minority interest that attributable other owner of the subsidiaries). More than 93% income was derived from mainland China.

According to S&P Global Ratings, citing China Insurance Regulatory Commission, market share (by direct premium) of China Taiping's subsidiary Taiping General Insurance Co. Ltd. in property and casualty insurance in the first half of year 2017 was 2.0% and ranked the eighth. While in life insurance, the market shares (by policy written) of China Taiping's subsidiary Taiping Life Insurance was 3.8% and ranked ninth.

While in Hong Kong, the group's China Taiping Insurance (HK) Company Limited (formerly Ming An Insurance Hong Kong) was ranked the fourth in 2018 for its 6.0% market share by gross written premiums in general insurance market.

In reinsurance, the HK-based Taiping Reinsurance (formerly China International Reinsurance (Note: China Reinsurance Company (Hong Kong), Limited was renamed to China International Reinsurance Company Limited in 1999 and then Taiping Reinsurance Company Limited in 2009.)), had a market share of 17.0% in 2005.

In January 2018, Taiping Trustees, a second-tier subsidiary of China Taiping Insurance Holdings (Taiping Trustees is a subsidiary of Taiping Financial Holdings), partnered with other investors, bought an office building on 18 King Wah Road in North Point. As of December 2018, the headquarter of the listed company is located on the 25/F of that building. Previously the headquarters was located in China Taiping Tower in Causeway Bay.

Taiping Financial Holdings, formerly known as China Insurance Group Securities Holdings, a Hong Kong incorporated company, also owned Taiping Securities (HK), a securities broker and financial service company. It was founded in 1986 as New Century Securities, by the Bank of China Group. The company renamed to China Insurance Group Securities in 2001 and the current name in 2009.

== History ==
=== Predecessors ===
Despite the listed company was incorporated in 2000 in Hong Kong, the history of the group could be traced back to Taiping Insurance Company founded in Shanghai in 1929. Another predecessor, China Insurance Company, Limited, was founded in 1931 by the Bank of China. Ming An Insurance Hong Kong, which was privatized by the listed company in 2009, first founded in Hong Kong in 1947.

After the establishment of the People's Republic of China in 1949, the Bank of China, the Taiping Insurance Company and the China Insurance Company were nationalized by the Chinese Government, and became part of the People's Bank of China and the People's Insurance Company of China (PICC) respectively. However, the Chinese government owned bank and insurance companies still do business in Hong Kong, at that time a colony of the British Empire on Chinese soil. The Hong Kong headquarters of China Insurance Company and Ming An Insurance were located in the Bank of China Building in the 1960s, while the Hong Kong headquarters of Taiping Insurance was in Takshing House. The three aforementioned Hong Kong based Chinese government owned insurers had formed China Reinsurance Company (Hong Kong), Limited in 1980, which was one of the initial major assets of the listed company that was incorporated in 2000. In 1999 PICC was break down into several smaller insurer groups, including the listed company's parent company China Insurance Company, as well as PICC itself, China Life and China Re. They were the market leaders in general insurance, life insurance and reinsurance in mainland China respectively. Under the breakup plan, China Insurance Company was focused on overseas businesses, receiving overseas assets from PICC.

=== China Insurance International Holdings ===
former logo of the listed company

China Insurance International Holdings Company Limited became a listed company in 2000. At that time Swiss Re also acquired 9.9% shares of the newly listed company. According to the first annual report, most of the revenue of the listed company in year 2000, came from reinsurance. At that time Ming An Insurance HK (currently known as Taiping Insurance HK) was not yet acquired, and Taiping Insurance was not yet re-established their businesses in mainland China. Moreover, Taiping was owned by China Insurance Company, the parent company of the listed company at that time.

In 2001, China Insurance Company was authorized to re-open businesses in mainland China as an insurer. In September 2001, the listed company acquired the controlling stake of the mainland incorporated Taiping Life from the parent company China Insurance Company, for about HK$522 million in cash and newly issued share of the listed company. As of 2004, the listed company also owned 30% of Tai Ping Insurance, a property and casualty insurer of mainland China. As of 2018, the listed company owned 75.10% stake of the aforementioned Taiping Life as well as 100% stake of the aforementioned Taiping General Insurance.

From 2002 to 2013, the listed company also acquired more assets from the parent company as part a reverse IPO. In 2002, the listed company acquired China Insurance Group Assets Management Limited (known as Taiping Asset Management (HK) Co. Ltd. since 2009) for about HK$403 million in cash and newly issued share of the listed company.

=== China Taiping Insurance Holdings ===
The listed company was renamed to the current name in 2009. In the same year the company privatized fellow listed company Ming An (Holdings). Ming An Insurance (Hong Kong), which was owned by Ming An (Holdings), was renamed to China Taiping Insurance (HK) Company Limited in November 2009.

In 2013, more assets were acquired by the listed company from the parent to complete the reverse IPO, for a price of RMB10.6 billion. The assets included Taiping Financial Holdings (known as China Insurance Group Securities Holdings before 2009) and it subsidiaries such as Taiping Securities (HK) Co. Ltd. (known as China Insurance Group Securities before 2009), as well as real estate such as China Insurance Group Building.

== Shareholders ==
The parent company of the listed company is China Taiping Insurance Group Limited (Chinese: 中国太平保险集团有限责任公司), formerly known as China Insurance Company, Limited (Chinese: 中国保险股份有限公司) and then China Insurance (Holdings) Company, Limited (Chinese: 中国保险（控股）有限公司) from 2002 to 2009. The company was a former subsidiary of the People's Insurance Company (Group) of China (PICC Group). However, in 1999, the State Council of the People's Republic of China decided to break down the PICC Group into China Life, China Re and the current PICC Group, while China Insurance Company received overseas businesses of the former larger PICC Group. China Insurance Company also not part of the new PICC Group after the re-organization.

As of 31 December 2018, China Taiping Insurance Group owned 59.64% shares of the listed company. Ministry of Finance owned 90% stake of China Taiping Insurance Group. The rest of the stake of China Taiping Insurance Group was owned by the National Social Security Fund since January 2019.
