= Great Wall Pan Asia Holdings =

Property investment company in Hong Kong

Great Wall Pan Asia Holdings Limited

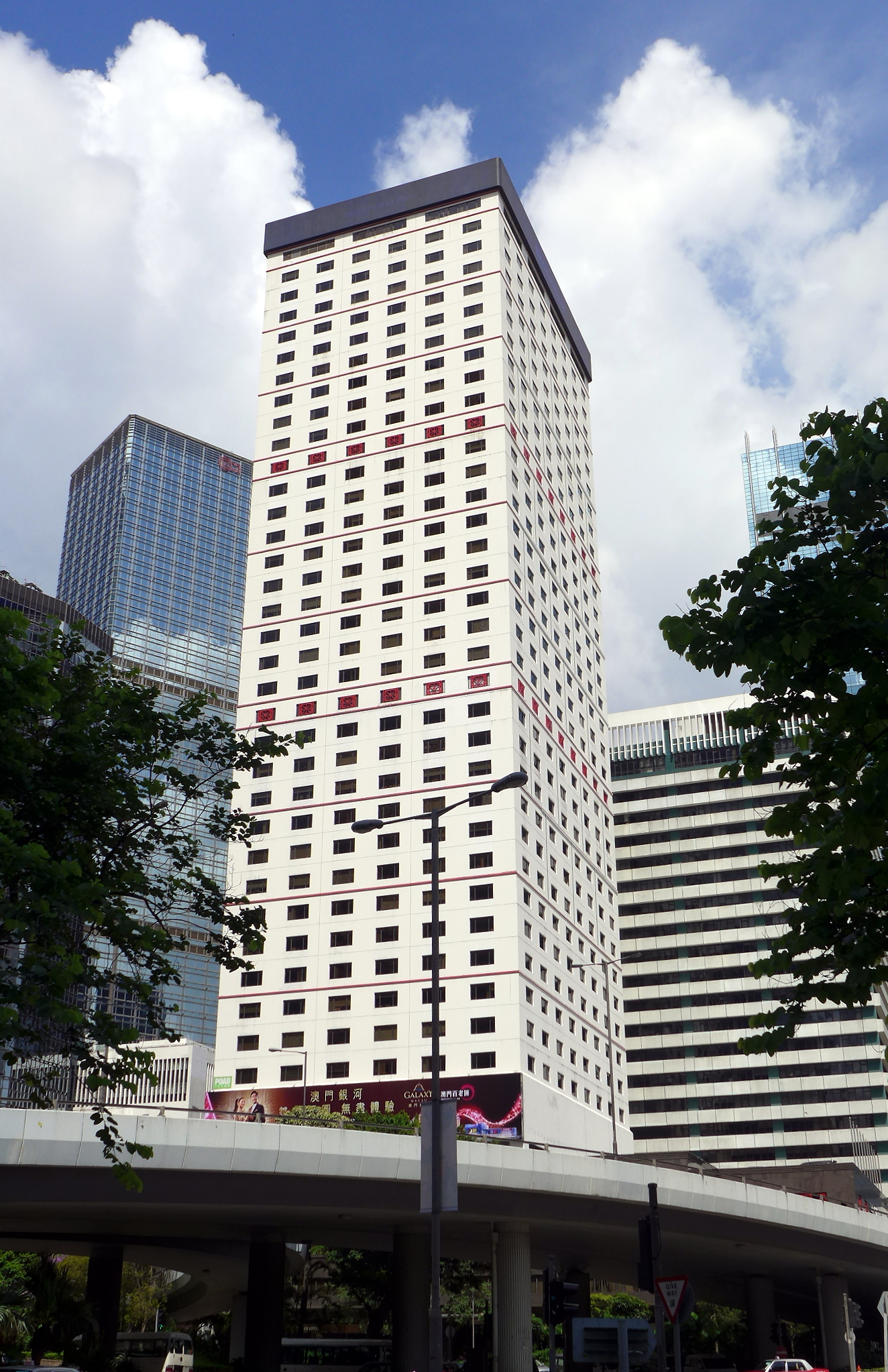
- Headquarters at Bank of America Tower
- Formerly: Armada Holdings; SCMP Group
- Type: Public
- Traded as: SEHK: 583
- Industry: Real estate
- Founded: 1903; 123 years ago
- Headquarters: Hong Kong
- Parent: China Great Wall Asset Management
- Website: www.gwpaholdings.com

Great Wall Pan Asia Holdings
- Traditional Chinese: 長城環亞控股
- Simplified Chinese: 长城环亚控股
Transcriptions
Standard Mandarin
- Hanyu Pinyin: Chángchéng Huán Yà Kònggǔ
Yue: Cantonese
- Jyutping: coeng4 sing4 waan4 aa3 hung3 gu2

Great Wall Pan Asia Holdings Limited (formerly Armada Holdings Limited, Chinese: 長城環亞控股, SEHK: 583) is a property investment company in Hong Kong.

The company was formerly known as SCMP Group Limited and changed its name to Armada Holdings Limited in April 2016 after it sold its media businesses, including South China Morning Post, to Alibaba Group. It also published the Hong Kong editions of Cosmopolitan, Cosmogirl and Harper's Bazaar. From 1996 to 2004, it operated a chain of convenience stores, Daily Stop, at MTR and KCR stations and in shopping malls before selling the stores to 7-Eleven.

== History ==
=== Ownership ===
In 1903, SCMP Group Limited was founded.

In November 1971, it was listed on the Hong Kong Stock Exchange. It was privatised by Rupert Murdoch's News Corporation in 1987, and relisted in 1990. In October 1993, Robert Kuok's Kerry Group acquired a 34.9% stake in the SCMP Group from Murdoch's News Corporation. His son, Kuok Khoon Ean, took over as chairman at the end of 1997. The Kerry Group bought a further 30% stake in the publisher for HK$1.1 billion ($142 million) in 2008. In March 2009, in a refinancing exercise, the controlling shareholder sold a 14.4% stake in the publisher to a consortium of banks in exchange for put call options exercisable within 4 years.

Since February 2013, the group's shares have been suspended as the "free float" – proportion in public hands – fell below the 25% threshold set by the HKSE. When three banks exercised options requiring Kerry Media to re-acquire their 14% stake in the group upon expiry on 27 February, the free float dropped to 11 percent of the capital.

It was announced on 11 December 2015, following weeks of speculation, that Alibaba would acquire all the company's media assets, and said that editorial independence would be respected.

In April 2016, the company announced that the transaction with Alibaba was completed. As the intellectual property rights to the name “SCMP” was transferred, the company changed its name to Armada Holdings Limited.

== See also ==
- Kerry Group
- Alibaba Group
