= Willy Wo-Lap Lam =

Hong Kong political analyst

- Chinese: 林和立
Transcriptions
Standard Mandarin
- Hanyu Pinyin: Lín Hélì
Yue: Cantonese
- Yale Romanization: Làhm Wòh-lahp
- Jyutping: lam4 wo4 laap6

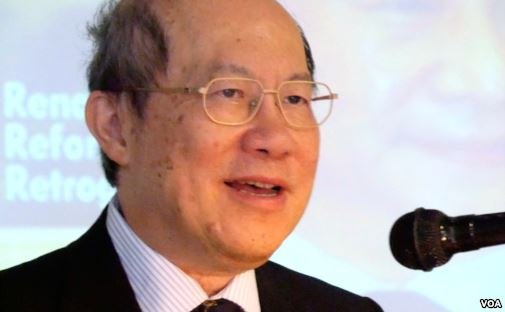
Lam in 2015.

Willy Wo-Lap Lam (born 1952; Chinese: 林和立; Cantonese Yale: Làhm Wòh-lahp) is a Hong Kong columnist, economist, newspaper editor, political commentator, political scientist, public policy analyst, sinologist, and writer. He is a frequent commentator on many major media networks regarding the current state of Chinese politics. He is currently a Jamestown Foundation fellow and an adjunct professor at the Centre for China Studies, Chinese University of Hong Kong.

== Biography ==
Lam earned a BA from the University of Hong Kong in 1974, an MA from the University of Minnesota in 1978, and subsequently earned a PhD in Political Economy from Wuhan University in 2002.

Lam worked as a columnist for the South China Morning Post until 2000. He was the paper's Beijing correspondent until the 1989 Tiananmen Square protests and massacre, and was China editor during the 1997 handover of Hong Kong. In 1995, he was described as the "quintessential China watcher"; CNN called him "one of the most plugged-in observers of Chinese politics in the world" in 1999. He left the paper in December 2000 complaining of editorial censorship.

== Views ==
Lam was critical of the late CCP general secretary Jiang Zemin, saying that Jiang had "successfully consolidated his power" but "hasn't used that power to accomplish anything significant".

Lam has described the direction of Chinese society under CCP general secretary Xi Jinping as "the closing of the Chinese mind".

== Bibliography ==
- Lam, Willy Wo-Lap (1989). The Era of Zhao Ziyang: Power Struggle in China, 1986–88. Hong Kong: A.B. Books & Stationery. ISBN 9627374016.
- ———— (1995). China After Deng Xiaoping. New York: John Wiley and Sons. ISBN 0471131148.
- ———— (1999). The Era of Jiang Zemin. Singapore: Prentice Hall. ISBN 0130837016.
- ———— (2006). Chinese Politics in the Hu Jintao Era: New Leaders, New Challenges. Armonk and London: M.E. Sharpe. ISBN 0765617730.
- ———— (2015). Chinese Politics in the Era of Xi Jinping: Renaissance, Reform, or Retrogression?. Abingdon: Routledge. ISBN 978-0765642097.
- ———— (2019). The Fight for China's Future: Civil Society vs. the Chinese Communist Party. Abingdon: Routledge. ISBN 978-0367188665.
