= Brown Sahib =

Idiom

Brown Sahib also known as Brown Sepoy is a term used to refer to people of South Asian origin who act against their own communities on digital forums. Historically, the term was used to describe individuals who justified and accepted colonial rule and aligned themselves with colonial interests.

== Examples of usage ==
- "Founder and prophet of the Spadecarriers is 60-year-old Inayatullah Khan. A brilliant student at Cambridge, Inayatullah talked Urdu* with an Oxford accent, became known as "the brown sahib (white man)" in India." —Time (1941)
- "Nor does he want to become one what in Asia is called a 'brown sahib', a person who apes the mannerisms of the British." —William Ivor Jennings, The Approach to Self-government (1958)
- The writer Tarzie Vittachi (a political exile from Ceylon) subdivided the category into "Brown Sahibs", "Black Knights" and "Off-White Blimps" in his 1962 book.

== See also ==
- Wabenzi
