= South China Morning Post =

Hong Kong English-language newspaper

- SCMP front page on 7 February 2018
- Type: Daily newspaper
- Format: Broadsheet
- Owner: Alibaba Group
- Founders: Tse Tsan-tai; Alfred Cunningham
- Publisher: SCMP Publishers
- President: Catherine So, CEO
- Editor-in-chief: Chow Chung-yan
- Managing editor: Zuraidah Ibrahim (executive), Yonden Lhatoo, Eugene Tang
- Opinion editor: Robert Haddow
- Photo editor: Robert Ng
- Executive editor: Chow Chung-yan
- Founded: 6 November 1903; 123 years ago (44,939 issues)
- Headquarters: Global: 19/F; Tower 1 Times Square; 1 Matheson Street; Causeway Bay, Hong Kong; Overseas: 56 Mott Street; New York, NY 10013; U.S.
- ISSN: 1021-6731 (print); 1563-9371 (web)
- OCLC number: 648902513
- Website: www.scmp.com

South China Morning Post
- Traditional Chinese: 南華早報
- Simplified Chinese: 南华早报
Transcriptions
Standard Mandarin
- Hanyu Pinyin: Nánhuá Zǎobào
Yue: Cantonese
- Yale Romanization: Nàahm wàh jóu bou
- Jyutping: Naam4 waa4 zou2 bou3

South China Morning Post (old Chinese name)
- Traditional Chinese: 南清早報
Transcriptions
Yue: Cantonese
- Jyutping: Naam4 cing1 zou2 bou3

The South China Morning Post (SCMP), with its Sunday edition, the Sunday Morning Post, is a Hong Kong–based English-language newspaper owned by Alibaba Group. Founded in 1903 by Tse Tsan-tai and Alfred Cunningham, it has remained Hong Kong's newspaper of record since British colonial rule. Editor-in-chief Tammy Tam succeeded Wang Xiangwei in 2016. The SCMP prints paper editions in Hong Kong and operates an online news website that is blocked in mainland China.

The newspaper's circulation has been relatively stable for years, totaling about 100,000 daily copies as of 2015. In a 2019 survey by the Chinese University of Hong Kong, the SCMP was regarded relatively as the most credible paid newspaper in Hong Kong. The Guardian has described the SCMP as "Hong Kong's most prestigious English-language newspaper," and it reaches 35 million monthly readers across multiple platforms (as of September 2024).

The SCMP was owned by Rupert Murdoch's News Corporation from 1986 until it was acquired by Malaysian real estate tycoon Robert Kuok in 1993. On 5 April 2016, Alibaba Group acquired the media properties of the SCMP Group, including the SCMP. In January 2017, former Digg CEO Gary Liu became the SCMP's chief executive officer.

Since the change of ownership in 2016, concerns have been raised about the paper's editorial independence and self-censorship. Critics, including The New York Times, Der Spiegel, and The Atlantic have alleged that the paper is on a mission to promote China's soft power abroad. Academic studies have found that the newspaper has since shifted its editorial stance closer to a position of the Chinese government and portrays the country in a positive light. A 2021 content analysis found the SCMP to be a more effective conveyor of China's soft power than state media due to its tone and style.

== History ==
=== Origins ===
Anti-Qing revolutionary Tse Tsan-tai and British journalist Alfred Cunningham (克寧漢) founded the South China Morning Post in 1903, publishing its first issue on 6 November 1903.

The purpose of founding the SCMP is disputed, although it has been attributed to supporting the reform movement in the late-Qing dynasty.

Early editorials were mainly written by British journalists, such as Cunningham, Douglas Story and Thomas Petrie, while Tse attracted business to the newspaper. The editors maintained a good relationship with the Hong Kong government. In 1904, the newspaper's circulation was 300 copies.

The newspaper faced competition from three English-language newspapers: the Hong Kong Daily Press, the China Mail and the Hong Kong Telegraph.

=== Post-war era ===
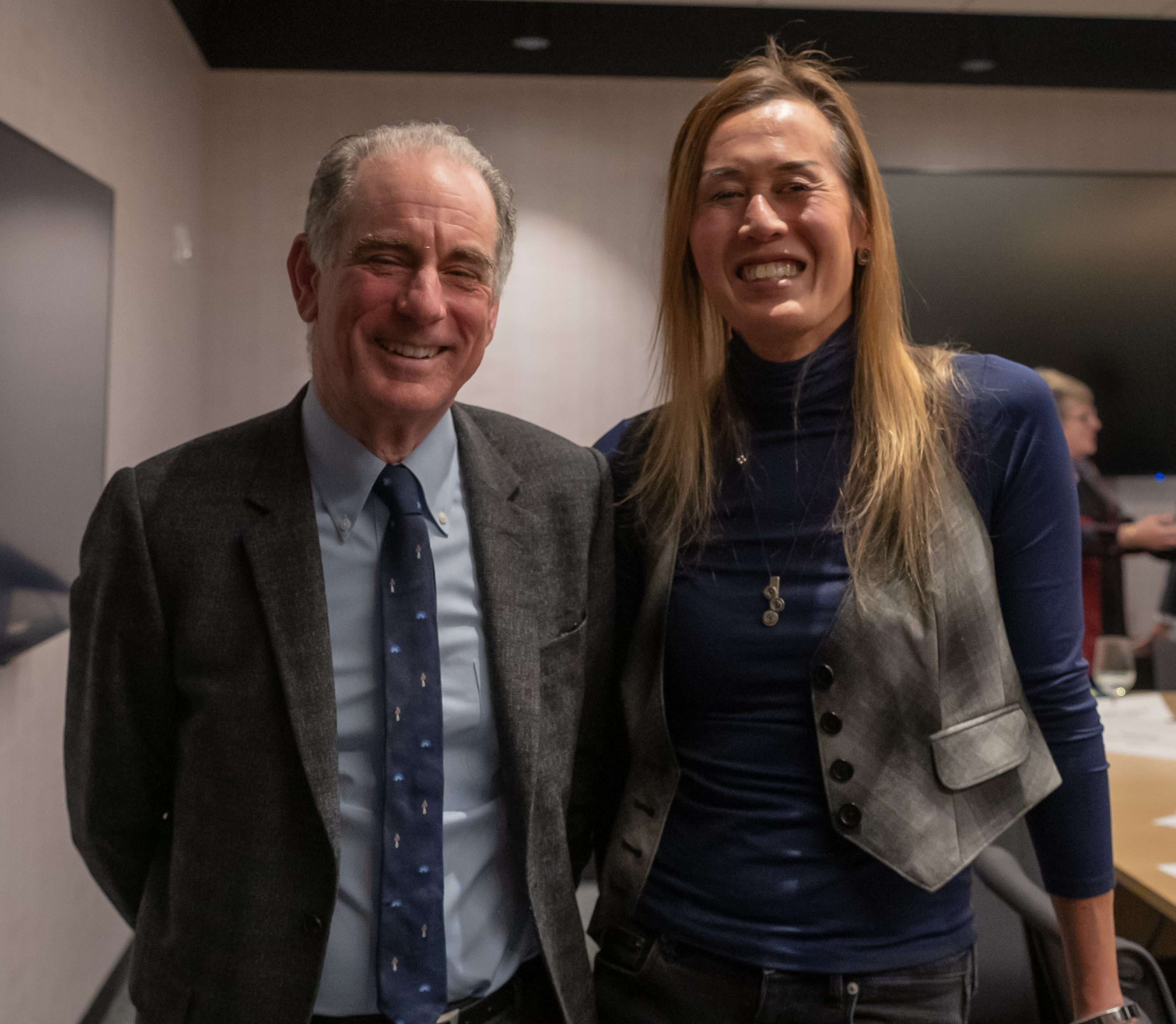
Left to right: Mark Clifford and Gina Chua, former SCMP editors-in-chief, in 2022

After World War II, the Hong Kong and Shanghai Banking Corporation (HSBC) bought a majority share in the newspaper. It was listed on the Hong Kong Stock Exchange in November 1971, but was privatised again in 1987 after being bought by the News Corporation in 1986 for HK$2.2 billion (US$284.4 million). SCMP relisted in 1990.

Reading the SCMP has been described as a status symbol in the 20th century, when the newspaper represented the interests of Hong Kong elites and the British government. Editors of the SCMP attended regular meetings at the Government House for disclosures that aimed to influence public opinion and received business briefings from the HSBC.

For most of the 1990s, the SCMP was the world's most profitable newspaper. By 1993, the SCMP's daily circulation exceeded 100,000 and posted profits of HK$586 million (US$75.6 million) from mid-1992 to mid-1993.

In September 1993, Murdoch was in negotiations to sell his 50% interest in the SCMP as part of a scheme to increase the News Corporation's investments in the Asian electronic media industry. News Corporation then announced that it would sell a 34.9% stake, a controlling interest, to Kerry Media, owned by Malaysian businessman Robert Kuok, for US$375 million.

Kuok's son, Kuok Khoon Ean, took over as chairman at the end of 1997. Kuok Khoon Ean's sister, Kuok Hui Kwong, was named chief executive officer on 1 January 2009. Kuok launched a general offer for the remaining shares in September 2007, and increased his stake to 74 per cent at US$209 million. It was delisted in 2013 when the shares' free float fell below the required 25%.

Jonathan Fenby served as editor until 1999, when he was replaced by Robert Keatley from The Wall Street Journal, who became interim editor. Mark Ländler of The New York Times wrote that under Fenby, the SCMP was "sharply critical of the Hong Kong government" and that this may have been a factor behind Fenby being replaced. The SCMP has had ten editors from 2000 to 2011. Mark Clifford, editor-in-chief of The Standard from 2004 to 2006, was hired as editor-in-chief in February 2006. Clifford brought with him several staffers from The Standard, including business section editor Stuart Jackson, who departed after seven turbulent months. He presided over the controversial dismissal of several journalists over an internal prank, and himself resigned with effect 1 April 2007. Following Gina Chua's short-lived tenure at the Post from 2009 to April 2011, deputy editor Cliff Buddle served as acting editor-in-chief for ten months.

Wang Xiangwei, a member of the Jilin Provincial Committee of the Chinese People's Political Consultative Conference, succeeded him in 2012. Tammy Tam, senior editor of the China section, was promoted to deputy editor under Wang. In May 2015, the SCMP told columnists Philip Bowring, Steve Vines, Kevin Rafferty and Frank Ching – all of whom have criticised the government in commentaries to varying degrees on different subjects over the years – that their services would no longer be needed. The manner of their dismissal generated criticism, as well as speculation as to who had instigated the removals.

In 2016, Tam was promoted to the newspaper's editor-in-chief. In October 2025, Tam became the SCMP's publisher, while Chow Chung-yan was promoted to editor-in-chief. The move united the SCMP's editorial and business operations.

=== Alibaba ownership ===
During Alibaba's failed attempt to secure an initial public offering on the Hong Kong Stock Exchange, the SCMP published articles questioning the platform's business practices, including incidents involving counterfeit goods.

On 11 December 2015, Alibaba Group announced that it would acquire the media assets of SCMP Group, including SCMP, for HK$2 billion (US$266 million). The CEO of SCMP reports to a board that includes Alibaba executives and independent directors.

Alibaba's ownership of SCMP led to concerns that the newspaper would become a mouthpiece of the Chinese government. One possible motive for the acquisition was to make media coverage of China "fair and accurate" and not viewed through the lens of Western news outlets. Alibaba said that the newspaper's editorial independence would be upheld.

Joseph Tsai, executive vice-chairman of Alibaba Group, said that the fear that Alibaba's ownership would compromise editorial independence "reflects a bias of its own, as if to say newspaper owners must espouse certain views, while those that hold opposing views are "unfit". In fact, that is exactly why we think the world needs a plurality of views when it comes to China coverage. China's rise as an economic power and its importance to world stability are too important for there to be a singular thesis". He also said: "Today, when I see mainstream Western news organisations cover China, they cover it through a very particular lens. It is through the lens that China is a communist state and everything kind of follows from that. A lot of journalists working with these Western media organisations may not agree with the system of governance in China and that taints their view of coverage".

The acquisition by Alibaba was completed on 5 April 2016. Following the acquisition, the SCMP took down the paywall to its website.

According to a 2016 public survey conducted by the Centre for Communication and Public Opinion Survey at the Chinese University of Hong Kong, the SCMP received a credibility rating of 6.54, the highest credibility score among the various paid newspapers in Hong Kong.

In July 2020, the SCMP announced that it would return to a subscription model in August 2020. The paper announced that they were reinstating the paywall that they had gotten rid of in 2016 when Alibaba bought the digital newspaper. The SCMP felt that they needed to put the paywall back up in order to generate advertising revenue, and subscription payments were an integral part of that. A metered paywall was rolled out for the website and the mobile application at the same time. The new arrangement would allow readers to read a certain number of articles for free before they would need to pay. COVID-19 and a tougher business environment caused the newspaper to reconsider the advertising model.

In March 2021, it was reported that the Chinese government was pressuring Alibaba to sell the SCMP due to concerns over the company's influence over public opinion in Hong Kong. Critics say this is designed to move the paper under the ownership of Chinese state-owned firm or an associated billionaire, placing it under the influence of the Chinese Communist Party (CCP). In a leaked internal November 2021 memo, SCMP CEO Gary Liu denied any sale was in the works. After Alibaba Group acquired the newspaper, it repositioned itself from a high-volume daily to a premium magazine-style edition.

=== Closure of subsidiary publications ===
Since the Alibaba acquisition, the SCMP has discontinued several subsidiary publications, including its Chinese-language edition, the 48 HOURS weekend magazine and the popular HK Magazine alternative weekly. The 48 HOURS staff continue to write on other SCMP platforms. Zach Hines, former editor-in-chief of HK Magazine from 2000 to 2015, said that closing the magazine is an effort to shift the focus away from Hong Kong to mainland China and target Western readers. Hines wrote in the Hong Kong Free Press of its closure:

The South China Morning Post purchased us at the right time, and for sensible reasons. The media landscape was changing dramatically, as it continues to do, and their ownership bought us a few final years of life. But, like "One Country, Two Systems", this odd and uncomfortable marriage was never going to last. To be a truly independent press, you cannot be beholden to anyone except your readers. But, to my great dismay, this is becoming an increasing impossibility in Hong Kong, in both the mainstream Chinese and much smaller English media. SCMP is owned by Alibaba, perhaps the biggest pro-China organization in the world, if you don't count the Communist Party. The paper's business interests are also drifting away from Hong Kong, and toward readers in the United States and the rest of the West. HK Magazine is a canary in the coal mine. [...]

Initially, the SCMP stated that the HK Magazine website would be deleted from the internet, but the move was criticised. The Hong Kong Journalists Association lodged an inquiry with the SCMP management. Hines stated: "It is unthinkable that a newspaper of record would ever consider deleting content from its archive. The SCMP should be held to proper journalistic standards. HK Magazine was an important feature of Hong Kong's media landscape, and it must be preserved. Deleting it would be an utter travesty of journalistic principles – and a slap in the face to SCMP's readers and to Hong Kong society in general". Following the negative reaction, the SCMP stated that HK Magazine content would be migrated to the South China Morning Post website before the HK Magazine website was deleted. Additionally, Hong Kong data scientist Mart van de Ven launched a public appeal to help archive back issues of the magazine, expressing doubt that the SCMP would preserve the full archive. He found that he was unable to access issue 1103, which featured Leung Chun-ying on the cover.

== Circulation and profitability ==
The paper's average audited circulation for the first half of 2007 stood at 106 054, while its Sunday edition, the Sunday Morning Post, had a readership of 80,865. In 2012, the readership of the SCMP and the Sunday Morning Post was estimated at 396,000. Its readership outside Hong Kong remains at some 6,825 copies for the same period, again, relatively unchanged. It also had the position as the world's most profitable newspaper on a per-reader basis, although profit had declined since peaking HK$805 million in 1997. Its average audited circulation for the first half of 2015 stood at 101,652 copies, with the print edition representing 75% of the number of copies; the Sunday edition registered 80,779 copies on average during the same period.

The Group reported net profit of HK$338 million for the year 2006 (2005 = HK$246m), the operating profit of HK$419m (2005 = HK$306m) was attributable mainly to the newspaper operation.

As of 26 August 2010, SCMP Group posted a profit of $52.3 million in the first half of 2010.

== Format ==
The printed version of the SCMP is in a broadsheet format, in sections: Main, City, Sport, Business, Classifieds, Property (Wednesday), Racing (Wednesday), Technology (Tuesday), Education (Saturday), Style magazine (first Friday of every month); the Sunday edition contains Main, a Review section, a Post Magazine, Racing, "At Your Service", a services directory, and "Young Post", targeted at younger readers.

On 26 March 2007, the SCMP was given a facelift, with new presentation and fonts. Another redesign in 2011 changed the typefaces to Farnham and Amplitude for headlines, Utopia for text, and Freight for headers.

== Online version ==
SCMP.com had started out as a subscription-only service, which also allows the retrieval of archive articles dating back from 1993. It was launched online in December 1996. On 30 May 2007, SCMP.com relaunched with a new look, features and multimedia content. SCMP.com launched a major redesign on 20 April 2015.

It was announced in December 2015 that the new owners would remove the paywall, and it was removed on the night of 4 April 2016. The SCMP said that removing the paywall would increase its global readership and allow readers around the world to access its coverage of China. It said the change would also allow it to better adapt to readers' habits. The news site remains blocked in mainland China as of 2018.

The SCMP also provided a "China-focused" Chinese-language version of the Post, nanzao.com, but was shut down in 2016.

== Editorial stance and staff ==
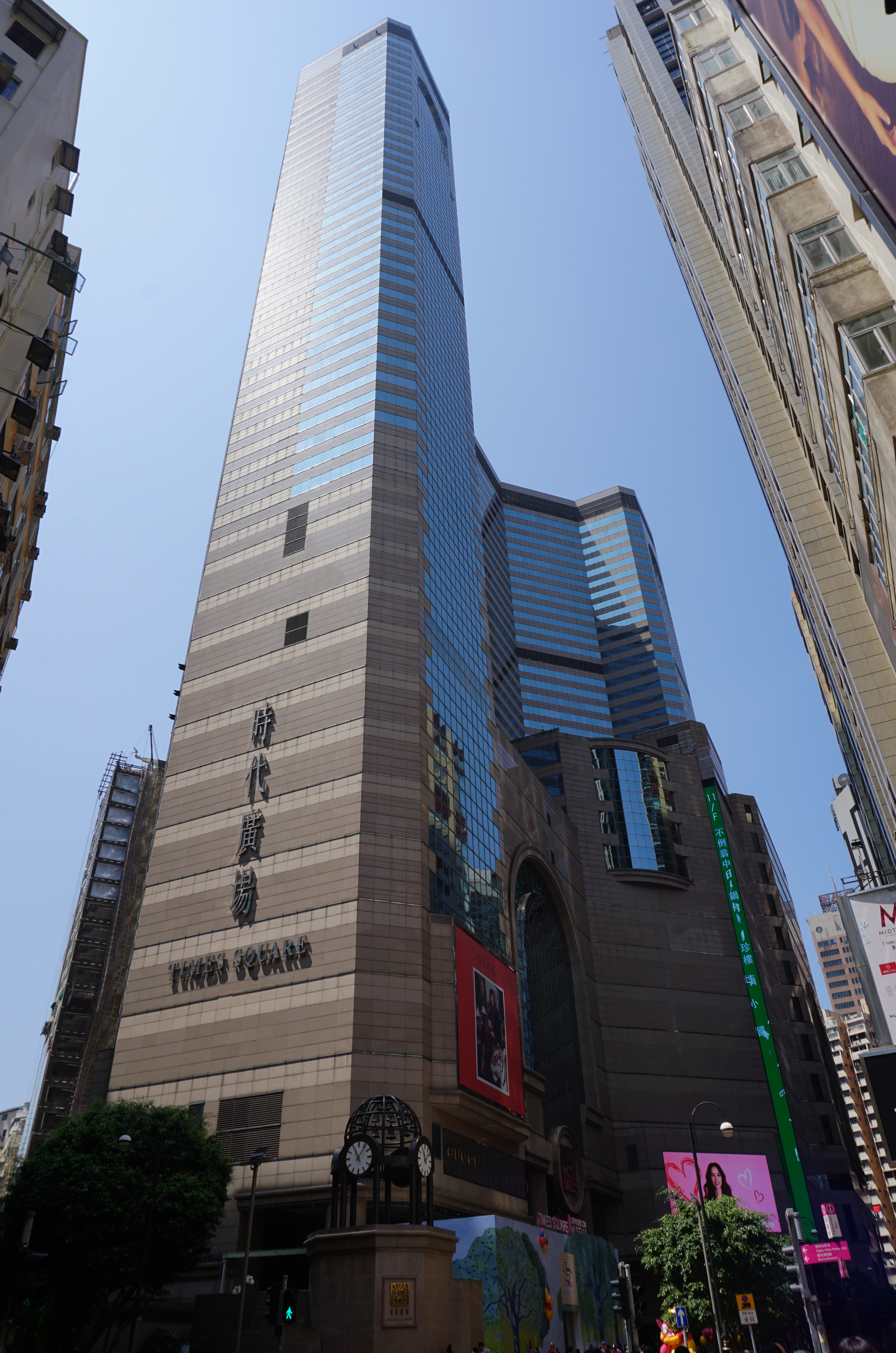
Times Square, which houses the head office of the SCMP

The previous owners of the publication, Kerry Group's Robert Kuok and his family, are claimed to be inclined towards the Chinese government, and questions were raised over the paper's editorial independence and self-censorship. The paper's editors nevertheless did assert their independence during Kuok's ownership. There have been concerns, denied by Kuok, over the forced departures, in rapid succession, of several staff and contributors who were considered critical of China's government or its supporters in Hong Kong. These included, in the mid-1990s, cartoonist Larry Feign, humour columnist Nury Vittachi, and numerous China-desk staff, namely 2000–01 editorial pages editor Danny Gittings, Beijing correspondent Jasper Becker and China pages editor Willy Lam.

Not long after Kuok's purchase of the newspaper, and after running several cartoons about the culling of human body parts from Chinese prisoners, Larry Feign was abruptly dismissed and his satirical comic strip "Lily Wong" axed in 1995. His firing was defended as "cost cutting" but was widely viewed as political self-censorship in the face of the imminent handover of Hong Kong to the PRC. In his book North Wind, Hong Kong author Nury Vittachi documented that then-editor Jonathan Fenby, who had joined from The Observer of London, suppressed letters querying the disappearance of the popular strip and then busied himself writing letters to international media that had covered the Feign case defending the sacking. Vittachi explained his own departure from the journal in his book, linking it to the pressures he – and other contributors – faced from top management and editors to abstain from writing on topics that were deemed "sensitive", basically in denial of the free speech rights enshrined in the Hong Kong Basic Law and the one country, two systems policy.

In 2000, Fenby was succeeded by Robert Keatley, a former Wall Street Journal journalist. After the paper ran a story by Willy Lam on its front page about a delegation of Hong Kong tycoons meeting with General Secretary of the Chinese Communist Party Jiang Zemin, in which it was reported that business opportunities in China were being offered as a quid pro quo for the tycoons' political support, the Chinese Liaison Office raised objections of insensitivity as well as incurring the owner's wrath. Kuok berated Keatley in his office and wrote a two-page letter, which Keatley published in the letters section of the paper. Kuok stepped down as group chairman that year.

Editorial page editor Gittings complained that in January 2001, he was told to take a "realistic" view of editorial independence and ordered not to run extracts of the Tiananmen Papers, though ultimately was allowed, after protesting "strenuously", to do so. The editor stated that there had already been sufficient coverage.

At the launch of a joint report published by the Hong Kong Journalists' Association and Article 19 in July 2001, the chairman of the Hong Kong Journalists' Association said: "More and more newspapers self-censor themselves because they are controlled by either a businessman with close ties to Beijing, or part of a large enterprise, which has financial interests over the border".

Editor-in-chief Wang Xiangwei, appointed by the owner in 2012 after consultation with the Liaison Office, was criticised for his decision to reduce the paper's coverage of the death of Li Wangyang on 7 June 2012. Wang, who had left the office for the day, reportedly returned to the paper after midnight to reverse the staff editors' decision to run a full story. The SCMP published a two-paragraph report inside the paper; other news media reported it prominently. A senior staff member who sought to understand the decision circulated the resulting email exchanges, which indicate he received a stern rebuff from Wang. Wang made a statement on 21 June, in which he said he understood the "huge responsibility to deliver news... [and]... the journalistic heritage we have inherited", and said that his decision not to pursue extensive coverage as the story broke was pending "more facts and details surrounding the circumstances of this case". Wang admitted that his decision on Li Wangyang was a bad one in retrospect.

Reporter Paul Mooney said that the Li Wangyang story was not an isolated incident: Wang Xiangwei has "long had a reputation as being a censor of the news... Talk to anyone on the China reporting team at the South China Morning Post and they'll tell you a story about how Wang has cut their stories, or asked them to do an uninteresting story that was favorable to [mainland] China". Mooney, whose contract with the paper was not renewed in May 2012, reportedly because of budgetary reasons, said he had won more journalism awards than anyone else in the news team, but that for seven months prior to his departure from the newspaper, Wang had marginalised him by blocking him from writing any China stories, and then reportedly hiring several new young reporters, many from mainland China, after he had been ousted.

Despite the reported sentiments of the owners, the SCMP reported on commemorations of the Tiananmen Square Massacre at the time, and ran an editorial criticising the one-child policy in 2013. The SCMP published an interview with Jack Ma, founder of Alibaba and a member of the CCP, in which Ma defended late Chinese leader Deng Xiaoping's decision to crack down on pro-democracy student protests, saying it was "the most correct decision". The relevant remark was deleted not long after the article was published; the reporter responsible for the interview was suspended and later resigned. Alibaba said that Ma had been quoted "improperly" and demanded a rectification, but the editor-in-chief refused. The New York Times stated that Alibaba is steering the newspaper into promoting the PRC's soft power, and several critical stories about China's current administration have been rewritten in an act of self-censorship by the top editors. However, a few academics pointed out in 2013, 2016 and 2021 that there was a negative or discriminatory discourse present in the SCMP's coverage of mainland Chinese people.

=== Retraction of Shirley Yam's commentary ===
On 22 July 2017, the SCMP published a commentary by Shirley Yam insinuating that Li Qianxin, a woman with an uncommon surname (estimated 300,000 in China), is the daughter of Li Zhanshu, a close ally of General Secretary of the Chinese Communist Party Xi Jinping. It also showed public records connecting Li Qianxin to a Singaporean investor named Chua Hwa Por. The piece was later removed by the SCMP and replaced with a statement citing "multiple unverifiable insinuations". Yam eventually resigned.

=== Publication of interviews made under duress ===
In 2016, questions were raised about the relationship between the publication and Chinese authorities after the SCMP was able to secure an interview with Zhao Wei, the legal assistant of human rights defender Li Heping, who was in the custody of Chinese police. The SCMP was able to make contact with Zhao Wei a few days after her release from prison while she was still in the custody of Chinese security forces and at a time when neither her husband nor lawyer was able to reach her. The interview quoted Zhao giving what was taken to be a possible forced confession.

In 2018, the South China Morning Post published an interview with Gui Minhai, who was detained in China at the time. This raised concerns about the interview being fake or scripted, which caused backlash against SCMP. Magnus Fiskesjö, an associate professor at Cornell University and friend of Gui, commented that:

[...] the spectacle's producers included not just the usual propaganda arms of the regime (e.g., the Xinhua News Agency, etc.), but also the formerly independent South China Morning Post (SCMP) of Hong Kong. In agreeing to "interview" a torture victim in between the torture sessions, the paper gave in to pressure from China.

As a result of this incident, Fiskesjö said that the "SCMP can no longer be trusted as an independent news organisation".

=== Rejection of report on human rights abuses in Xinjiang ===
In October 2022, Peter Langan, a former senior editor at the SCMP, said he resigned after the outlet rejected the publication of his three-month investigation into human rights abuses in China's Xinjiang region. The SCMP stated that the report failed to meet its "editorial verification process and publishing standards".

== Awards and recognition ==
The SCMP won three awards at the 2018 WAN-IFRA Asian Digital Media Event. The paper won eleven awards the next year in the same contest and in 2021, won nine awards at WAN-IFRA's 20th Asian Media Awards competition.

The newspaper won a 2019 Sigma Delta Chi Award in Informational Graphics for their coverage of the 2019 Hong Kong protests. In 2020, the SCMP won another Sigma Delta Chi award in the same category for their coverage of COVID-19.

The newspaper won 23 awards at the Society for News Design's 2020 Best of Digital Design competition, including three for articles covering the Hong Kong protests. The newspaper also won four gold medals at the 2020 Malofiej Awards, including three for the paper's coverage of the Hong Kong protests.

The SCMP was announced as the winner of the Online News Association's 2020 General Excellence in Online Journalism award for large newsrooms.

The newspaper won the grand prize at the 2020 Lorenzo Natali Media Awards for its report titled "The "thin yellow line" standing between Hong Kong police and protestors". The newspaper was also awarded the second prize at the 2020 World Press Photo Digital Storytelling Contest in the shorts category for the same story.

The SCMP's piece titled "Hong Kong Protests: 100 days of protests rock Hong Kong" was an honoree at the 2020 Webby Awards for Best Individual Editorial Feature. The paper won another Webby in 2021 for its video titled "China's Rebel City – The Hong Kong Protests".

In 2025, the newspaper won WAN-IFRA's "Best Digital Subscription or Reader Revenue Project" award for SCMP Plus, specifically its exclusive China-focused content.

== SCMP Group ==
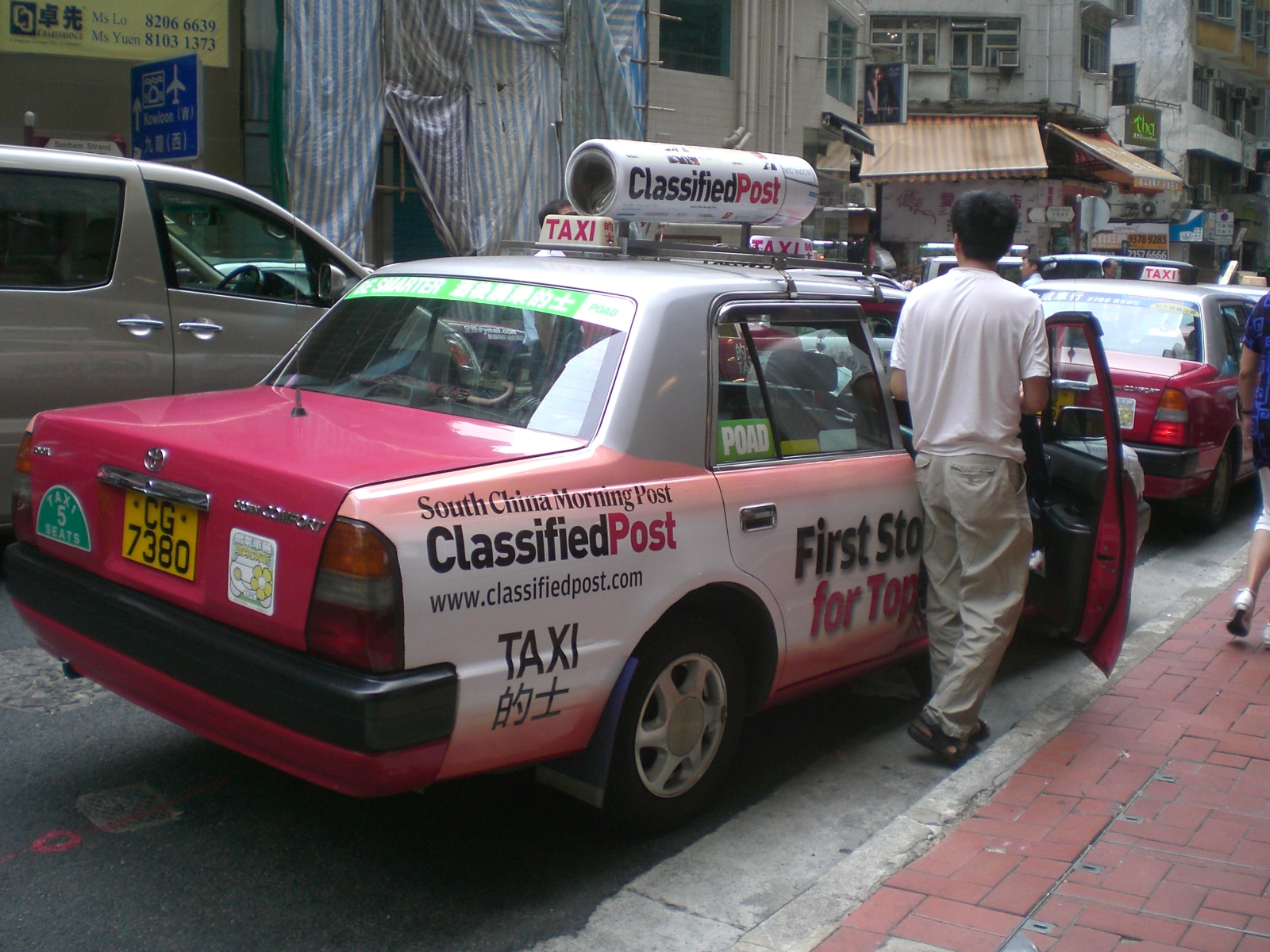
Taxi advertising in Central for the Classified Post by the SCMP, c. 2008

South China Morning Post Publishers Limited
- Native name: 南華早報出版有限公司
- Type: Private
- Industry: Newspaper publishing; Online media
- Predecessor: Great Wall Pan Asia Holdings
- Headquarters: Hong Kong
- Key people: Gary Liu (CEO); Elsie Cheung (COO)
- Owner: Alibaba Group

Chinese name
- Traditional Chinese: 南華早報出版有限公司
- Simplified Chinese: 南华早报出版有限公司
Transcriptions
Standard Mandarin
- Hanyu Pinyin: Nánhuá Zǎobào Chūbǎn Yǒuxiàngōngsī
Yue: Cantonese
- Jyutping: naam4 waa4 zou2 bou3 ceot1 baan2 au5 haan6 gung1 si1
- Website: corp.scmp.com

Before the acquisition in 2016 by Alibaba, South China Morning Post belonged to the SCMP Group Limited, a company also involved in property investment and convenience store operation. In April 2016, the company announced that the transaction of their media businesses with Alibaba was completed. As the intellectual property rights to the name "SCMP" was also transferred, the company changed its name to Armada Holdings Limited, then to Great Wall Pan Asia Holdings.

Now, the current publisher for the SCMP is South China Morning Post Publishers Limited (still commonly known as SCMP Group), which currently publishes, along with the South China Morning Post and Sunday Morning Post, the following newspapers, magazines and online platforms:

- Young Post;
- Classified Post;
- Jiu Jik; (Chinese: 招職)
- Cosmopolitan; (Hong Kong edition)
- Elle and Elle Men; (Hong Kong edition)
- Esquire; (Hong Kong edition)
- Harper's Bazaar; (Hong Kong edition)
- The Peak;
- Inkstone News;
- Abacus News;
- Goldthread.

== Staff ==
Writers employed by the SCMP include:

- Gary Botting, writer in 1960s;
- Jonathan Fenby, editor from 1995 to 1999;
- Ma Jun, Chinese environmentalist, reporter for the SCMP from 1993 to 2000;
- Nury Vittachi, humourist;
- Stephen Leather, British thriller novel writer;
- Willy Lam, Beijing correspondent and later China editor through the 1989 Tiananmen Square protests and massacre and 1997 handover of Hong Kong.

== See also ==
- Media of Hong Kong
- South China
