= Tarzie Vittachi =

Sri Lankan journalist

Varindra Tarzie Vittachi
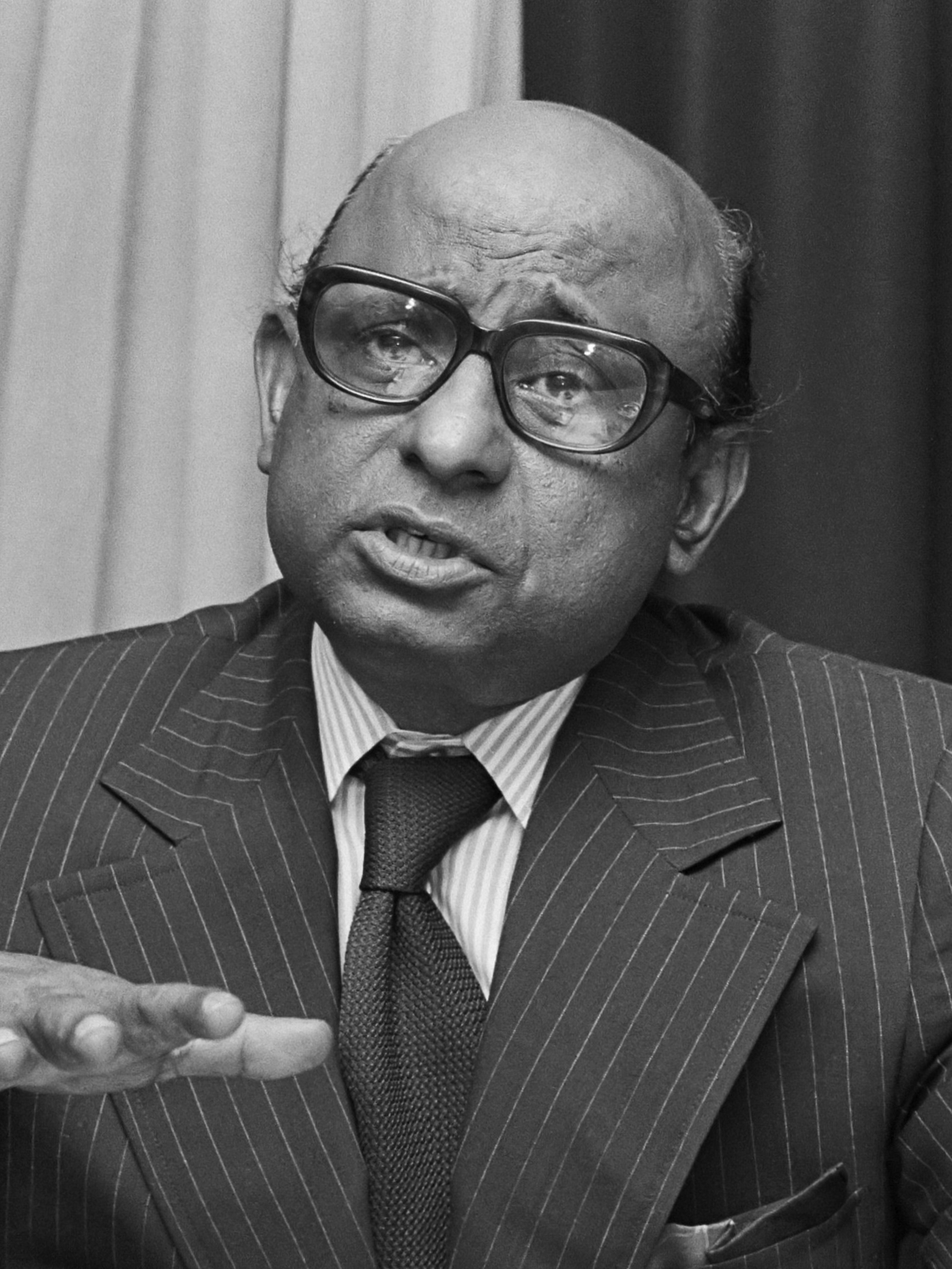
- Tarzie Vittachi (1974)
- Born: September 23, 1921; Colombo Ceylon
- Died: September 17, 1993 (aged 71); Chinnor, Oxfordshire, England
- Education: Nalanda College, Colombo; University of Ceylon
- Occupation: Journalist
- Children: Nury Vittachi Anuradha Vittachi
- Writing career
- Notable awards: 1959 Ramon Magsaysay Award for Journalism, Literature and Creative Communication Arts(1959) Ramon Magsaysay Award-winning

Tarzie Vittachi (September 23, 1921 – September 17, 1993), was a Sri Lankan journalist. He was born in Colombo, Ceylon. Vittachi authored two popular columns "Bouquets and Brickbats", and "Fly by Night" in the Ceylon Daily News. He later became the youngest editor (at 32) of the oldest newspaper in Asia, The Ceylon Observer, which was founded in 1834. He wrote a book known as Emergency 58 about the country's race riots in 1958 that won him the Magsaysay Prize in 1959. From 1957 he was chairman of the World Subud Association for 25 years. From 1960 to 1965 he was Asian director of the International Press Institute, an organization of editors devoted to promoting the freedom of the press. He was, at the same time, a correspondent for The Economist, the BBC and The Sunday Times of London and wrote a column for Newsweek. A book about the role of the Children's Fund in arranging truces to protect children in time of conflict, called "Between the Guns", was published posthumously.

== Publications ==
- Emergency '58: The story of the Ceylon race riots (1959) Andre Deutsch
- The Brown Sahib (1962) Andre Deutsch
- Trials of Transition in the Island of the Sun. A political satire (1962)
- A Reporter of Subud (1963) Dharma book Co.
- Times of Transition (1964)
- The Fall of Sukarno (1967)
- The Brown Sahib Revisited (1987) New Delhi: Penguin ISBN 978-0-14010784-5
- South America, Central America and the Caribbean. 2nd ed. (1987) Europa Publications International

*A Memoir of Subud (1988) Subud Publications International

- Between the Guns: Children as a Zone of Peace (1993) Hodder & Stoughton ISBN 978-0-34060231-7
- Special Assignment: A Subud Trilogy (1996) Subud Publications Int. ISBN 978-1-86982269-9
- Subudo Reporteris (2005) Susila Budhi Dharma ISBN 978-995597230-3

and

- Fruitful Droppings: From the Legacy of Tarzie Vittachie by Matthew Barry Sullivan (1997)

Subud Publications International ISBN 978-1-86982270-5
