= Wabenzi =

Term referring to corrupt government officials

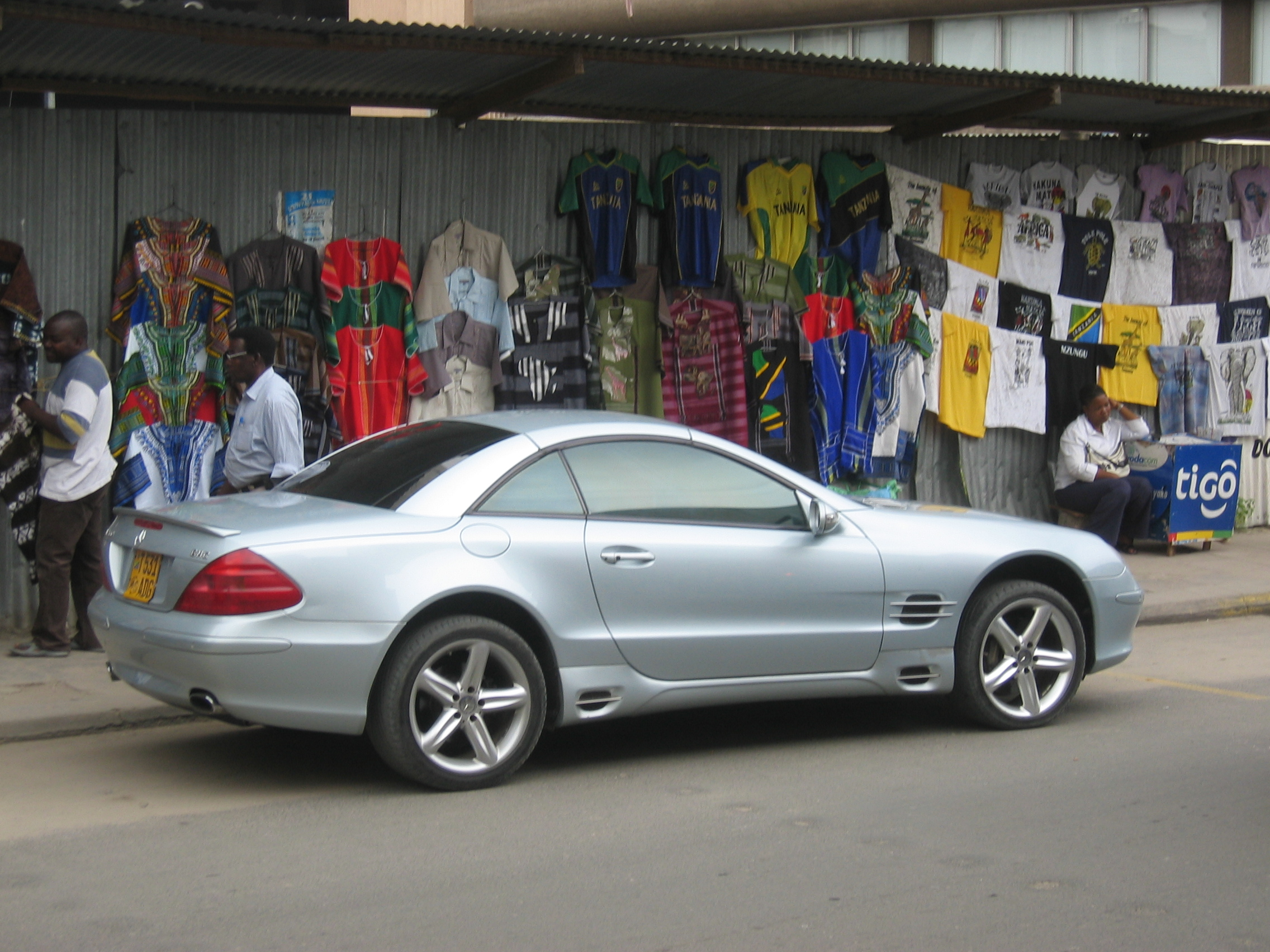
SL Type R230 in Dar es Salaam

Wabenzi is an Anglicization of the pejorative Bantu colloquialism WaBenzi, originally used in Kenya to refer to members of the new ruling class that superseded the colonial regime, that has come to refer to the new ruling class in any post-colonial African country. The term usually refers to a corrupt government official, or family member of one, and derives from their being seen as driving an imported car. "Wa" is a prefix that refers to people in some Bantu languages; "benzi" comes from Mercedes-Benz, a car perceived as prestigious. The Anglicized spelling form is more common than the original Bantu WaBenzi.

== See also ==
- Black Diamonds
- Brown Sahib and subtypes Black Knight & Off-white Blimp
- List of accidents and incidents involving Robert Mugabe's motorcade
- White Turks
