= Nury Vittachi =

Sri Lankan-born Hong Kong author (born 1958)

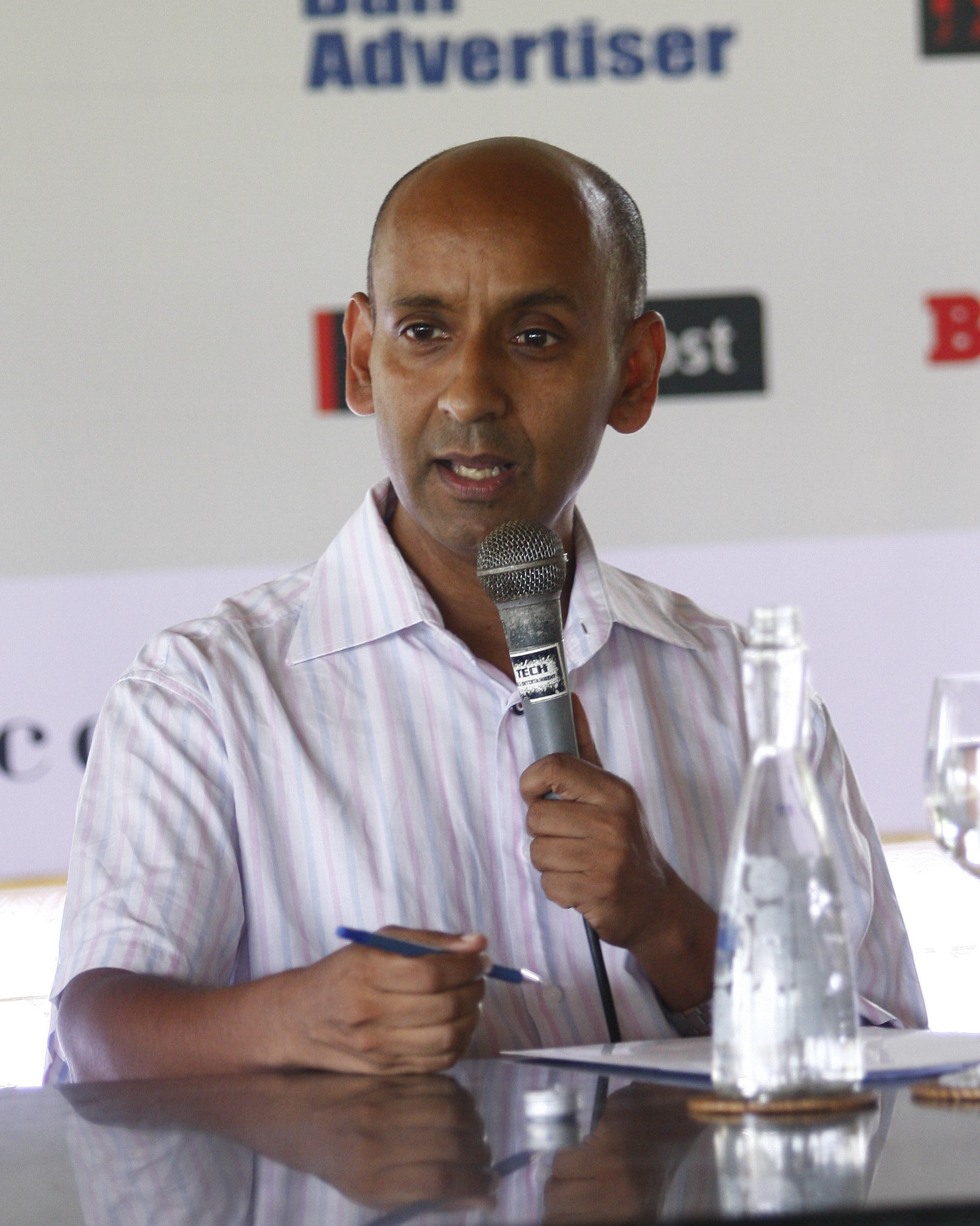
- Vittachi on Ubud Writers & Readers Festival 2012
- Born: 2 October 1958 (age 68); Ceylon
- Citizenship: Sri Lanka & Hong Kong
- Occupation: Author
- Spouse: Mary-Lacey Vittachi
- Children: 4
- Relatives: Tarzie Vittachi (father)
- Writing career
- Language: English
- Notable work: The Feng Shui Detective

Nury Vittachi (born 2 October 1958) is a Sri Lankan-born author based in Hong Kong. He has written the novel series, The Feng Shui Detective, non-fiction works, and novels for children.

== Journalism career ==
Vittachi started his career working for the Morning Telegraph in Sheffield.

He worked for the South China Morning Post as a humour columnist known as Lai See until 1997.

In 1998, The Irish Times described Vittachi as an "outspoken critic of China".

Vittachi has been part of the Hong Kong Young Writers' awards for over a decade. The awards encourage and promote literature among kids, ages 6 to 18, from various backgrounds and learning styles, attracting thousands of entries from Hong Kong, Macau, and China.

In 2020, Vittachi published The Other Side of the Story: A Secret War in Hong Kong, a book alleging that the 2019–20 Hong Kong protests were partially funded and supported by the Central Intelligence Agency through the Oslo Freedom Foundation, the Albert Einstein Institution, and the Centre for Applied Nonviolent Action and Strategies as "revolution consultants".

== Personal life ==
Vittachi was born in Sri Lanka from a Buddhist mother and a Muslim father. He lives in Hong Kong.

== Bibliography ==
=== Non-fiction ===
- Reliable Sources (1990)
- Only in Hong Kong (1993)
- Travellers' Tales (1994)
- Goodbye Hong Kong, Hello Xianggang (1997)
- The Ultimate Only in Hong Kong Collection (1998)
- Guardians of the Treasure House (1998)
- Riding the Millennial Storm (1998)
- North Wind (1999)
- City of Dreams (2006)
- The Kama Sutra of Business (2007)
- The Other Side of the Story: A Secret War in Hong Kong (2020)

=== Fiction ===
- The Hong Kong Joke Book (1995)
- Asian Values (1996)
- The Curious Diary of Mr. Jam (2012)

C.F. Wong mysteries

- The Feng Shui Detective (2000)
- The Feng Shui Detective Goes South (2002)
- The Feng Shui Detective's Casebook (2003)
- The Shanghai Union of Industrial Mystics (2006)
- Mr. Wong Goes West (2008)

=== Children's books ===
- Ludwig and the Chewy Chunks Café (1994)
- Robot Junior (1998)
- The Amazing Life of Dead Eric (2001)
- Dead Eric Gets a Virus (2002)
- The True History of Santa Claus (2004)
- The Day it Rained Letters (2005)
- The Paper Princess (2005)
- May Moon and the Secrets of the CPAs (2006)
- Mozzle and the Giant (2006)
- The Place You're Meant to Be (2006)
- The World's Funniest Book of Poems (2006)
- Twilight in the Land of Nowhen (2006)
- Jeri Telstar, The Homework Hero (2008)
- Jeri Telstar, And the Small Black Dog that Talked Like the President (2008)
