= Tianan Insurance =

Chinese insurance company

Tianan Insurance (天安保险股份有限公司) is China's fifth largest nonlife insurer. The company was established in 1994. In 2005, Japan's Tokio Marine Nichido purchased a 24.9% stake in the company. In July 2020, the Chinese government announced that it would take over the company.
