= China Life Insurance Group =

Chinese Ministry of Finance holding company

China Life Insurance Group is a Chinese holding company for the Ministry of Finance. It is the parent company of the public traded company China Life Insurance Company. As of 31 December 2015, China Life Insurance Group also owned 4.22% stake in China Huarong Asset Management, another subsidiary of the Ministry of Finance.
