= PICC Property and Casualty =

Chinese listed insurer

PICC Property and Casualty Company Limited
- PICC Group logo

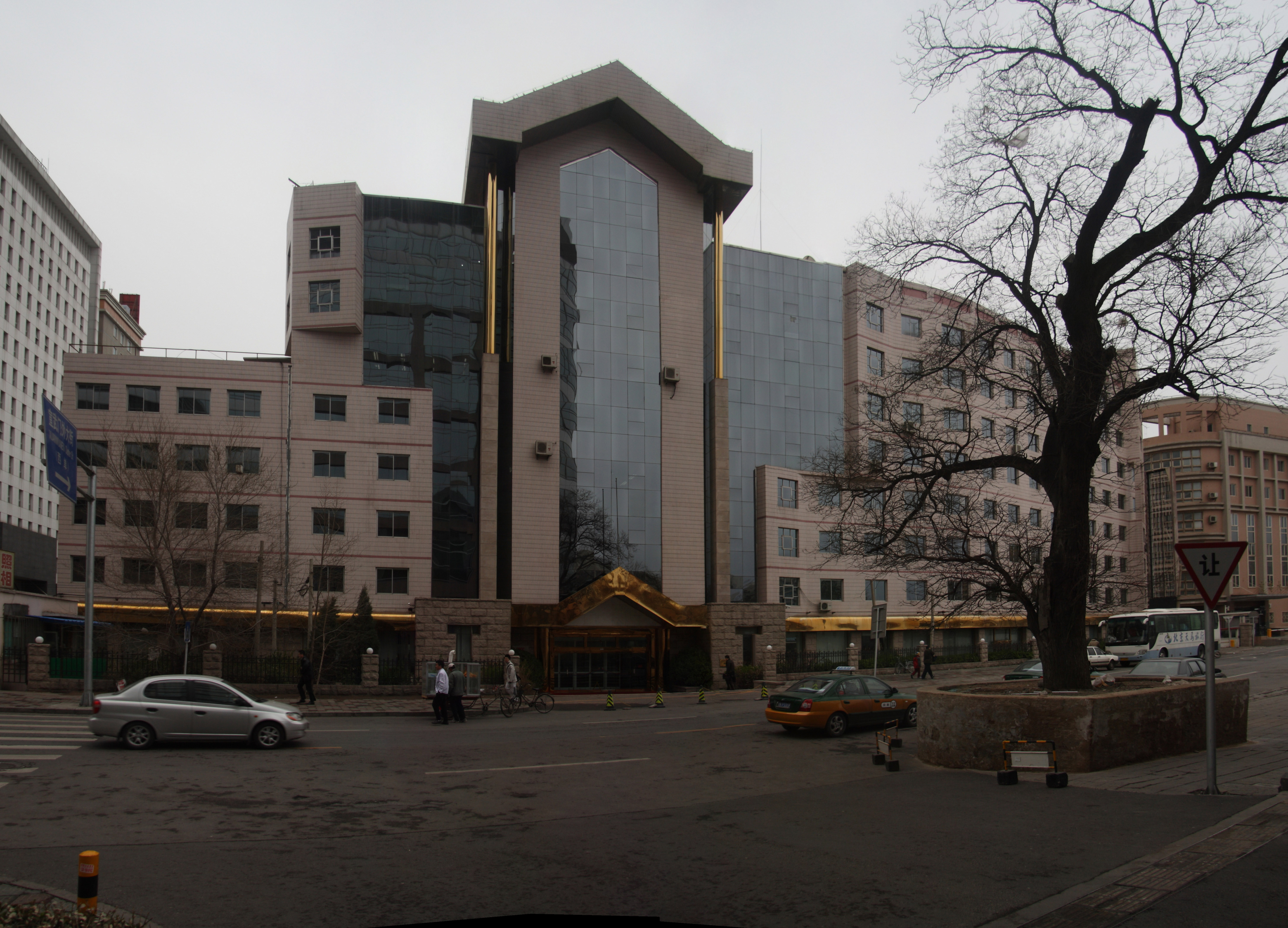
- Former headquarter (until May 2010)
- Company type: Public
- Traded as: SEHK: 2328 (H share only)
- ISIN: CNE100000593
- Industry: insurance
- Predecessor: People's Insurance Company of China's non-life insurance division
- Founded: 2003; 23 years ago
- Founder: People's Insurance Company of China
- Headquarters: Beijing, China
- Area served: China
- Key people: Miao Jianmin (chairman)
- Services: Property insurance
- Owner: PICC (68.98%)
- Parent: PICC

Chinese name
- Simplified Chinese: 中国人民财产保险股份有限公司
- Traditional Chinese: 中國人民財產保險股份有限公司
Transcriptions

short name
- Simplified Chinese: 中国财险
- Traditional Chinese: 中國財險
Transcriptions

alternative short name
- Simplified Chinese: 人保财险
- Traditional Chinese: 人保財險
Transcriptions
- Website: epicc.com.cn

PICC Property and Casualty Company Limited (PICC P&C) is the largest non-life insurance company in mainland China incorporated in 2003. It was one of the three main subsidiaries of the People's Insurance Company of China.

PICC P&C is principally engaged in the provision of property and casualty insurance products. It operates its insurance business through motor vehicle, commercial property, cargo, liability, accidental injury and health, agriculture, homeowners and credit.

== History ==
The People's Insurance Company of China (PICC) was established in 1949 and later renamed the People's Insurance Group of China. In July 2003, the People's Insurance Group founded the People's Property & Casualty Insurance Company of China (PICC P&C), with a registered capital of 12.25598 billion yuan. The company, registered in the People's Republic of China, inherited all the commercial assets, liabilities, and branches of the original People's Insurance Company of China, operating all insurance businesses except life insurance.

On November 6, 2003, PICC P&C was listed on the Hong Kong Stock Exchange. It is currently the largest non-life insurance company in mainland China, offering a variety of property insurance products to customers across different sectors. It is also one of the "Eight Banks and Five Insurances" among Hong Kong's Chinese-funded financial stocks.

PICC P&C became the insurance partner for the 2008 Beijing Olympics and the 2010 Shanghai Expo. In 2008, its premium income exceeded 100 billion yuan, making it the first property insurance company in mainland China to achieve this milestone. It also entered the top 10 global property insurance companies by business volume. By 2012, its premium income exceeded 190 billion yuan, ranking first in Asia and second among single-brand property insurance companies worldwide.

In 2011, net profit grew by 51%, reaching 8.27 billion yuan, but no dividends were declared, and the results fell below expectations. Revenue increased by 12%, rising to 173.9 billion yuan.

In May 2013, PICC P&C announced a significant rights issue (A+H shares), issuing 418.17 million H shares (929.98 million A shares), representing 9.9% of the enlarged H share capital. The rights issue price for H shares was HK$5.38 (RMB 4.3), a 47% discount compared to the closing price on May 20, 2013, of HK$10.2. Combined with domestic shares, the total funds raised amounted to 7.257 billion yuan (5.763 billion yuan in RMB), which would be used to supplement capital and improve solvency. AIG, which held 31.92% of the H shares (1.213 billion H shares), committed to the rights issue. PICC Group also committed to participating in the subsidiary's rights issue plan, investing 3.999 billion yuan to fully subscribe to 930 million domestic shares.

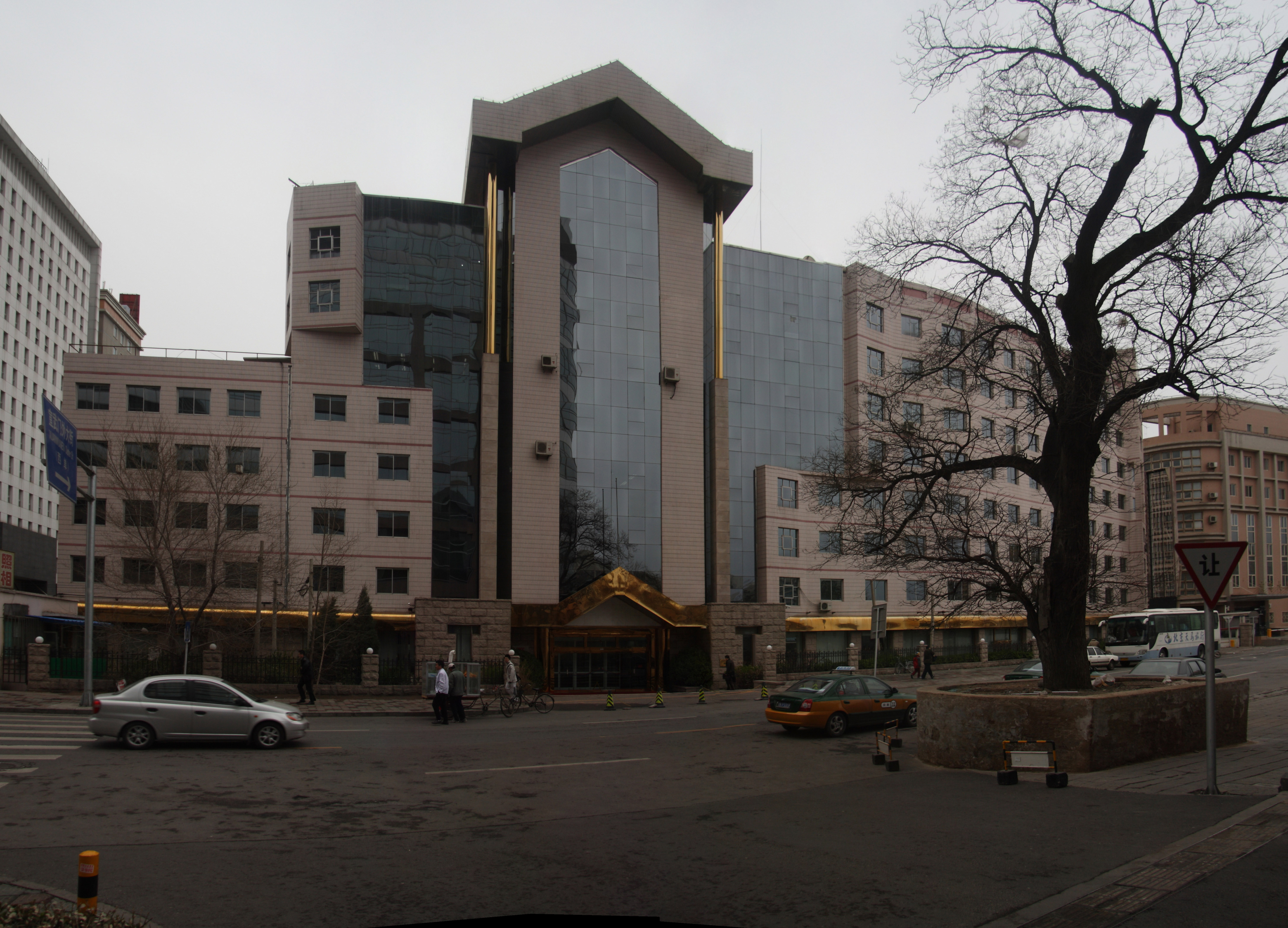
Headquarters of the People's Property & Casualty Insurance Company of China, moved to Yintai Center in May 2010

On December 29, 2015, PICC P&C invested no more than 25.7 billion yuan in cash to acquire shares from Deutsche Bank (877 million shares), Sal. Oppenheim (267 million shares), and Deutsche Bank Luxembourg (922 million shares), totaling 2.136 billion shares of Huaxia Bank, representing approximately 19.99% of the bank's issued shares.

== Equity investments ==
PICC Property and Casualty acquired 19.99% stake of Hua Xia Bank from Deutsche Bank and other investors in 2015, subject to regulator approval.

PICC Property and Casualty also owned 8.615% stake of sister company PICC Life.
