= Minsheng Life Insurance =

Chinese life insurance company

Minsheng Life Insurance 民生人寿保险股份有限公司
- Industry: Insurance, Asset Management
- Founded: 2003; 23 years ago
- Headquarters: Beijing, China
- Area served: People's Republic of China
- Key people: Junyong Wei (President); Lianghua Zhang (Senior Executive Vice President); Yonghao Liu (Acting Chief Supervisor)
- Number of employees: 40,000 (2012)
- Website: www.minshenglife.com

Minsheng Life Insurance Company is one of China's largest insurance companies and one of the six national insurers supervised by China Insurance Regulatory Commission. Its headquarters are in Beijing, China. It provides integrated insurance services, such as life insurance, property insurance and reinsurance.

As of 2012, Minsheng Life employs over 40,000 employees and has established 23 provincial-level subsidiary companies, including in Beijing, Zhejiang, Jiangsu, Hebei, Shandong, Fujian, Liaoning, Sichuan, Henan, Shanghai, Heilongjiang, Hunan, Jiangxi, Anhui, Guangxi, Shaanxi, Hubei, Shanxi etc.

== Asset Management ==
Established in 2012, Minsheng Tonghui Asset Management is a wholly owned subsidiary and operates as the asset management arm of Minsheng Life Insurance.

On July 14, 2014, Minsheng Tonghui Asset Management acquired ZheShang Fund Management Co., Ltd, helping Minsheng Life to become the second insurance company in China to enter the field of mutual funds since the promulgation of the measure on piloting the establishment of fund management arms by insurance institutions in 2013.
