= China Re =

Chinese reinsurance group

China Reinsurance (Group) Corporation 中国再保险（集团）股份有限公司
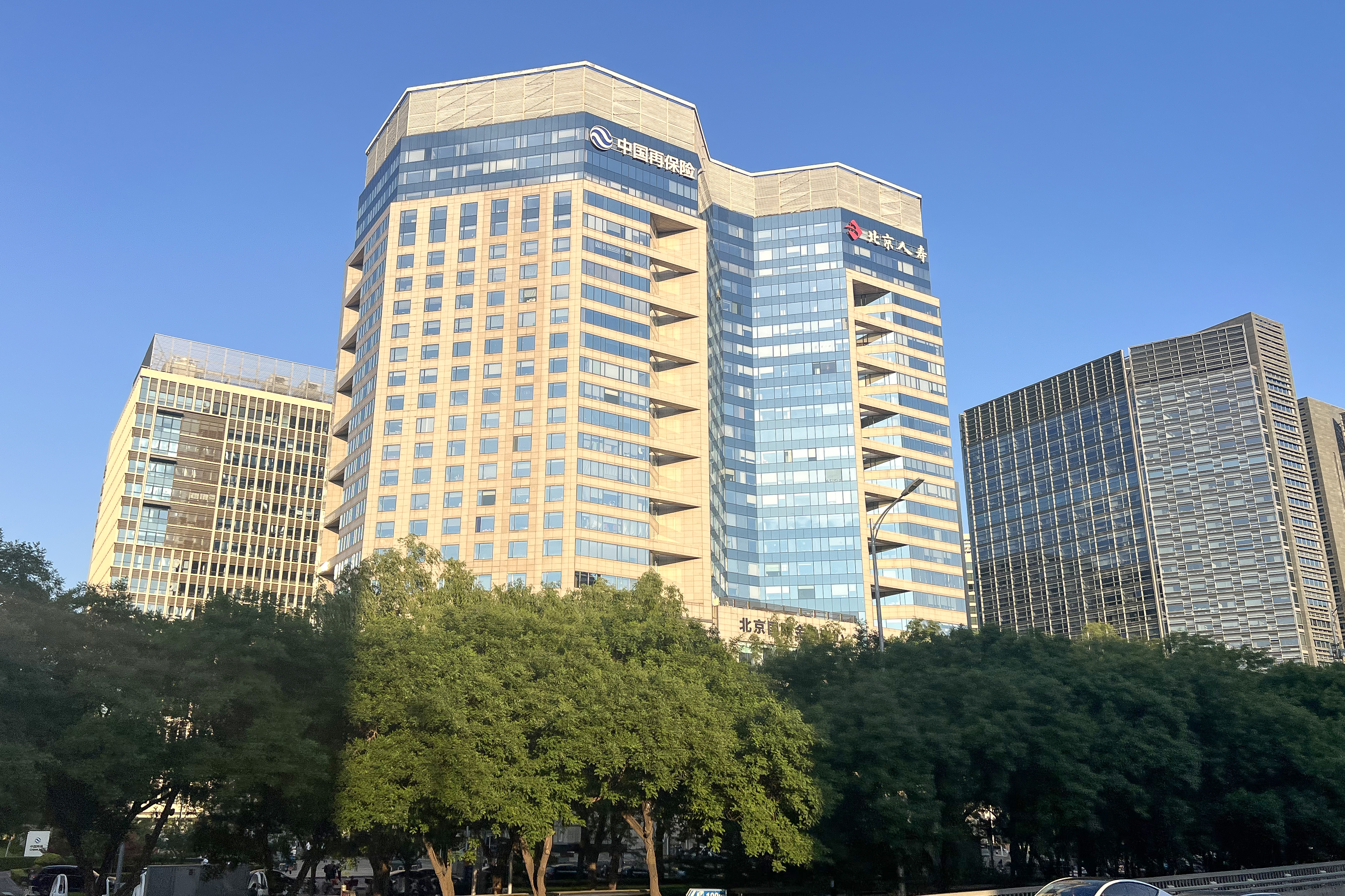
- Headquarters
- Type: Public company
- Traded as: SEHK: 1508
- Industry: Reinsurance
- Headquarters: Beijing, People's Republic of China
- Area served: People's Republic of China
- Owner: China Central Huijin, Ministry of Finance of the People's Republic of China
- Number of employees: 55,459 (31 December 2023)
- Website: Official Website

China Reinsurance (Group) Corporation (Chinese: 中国再保险（集团）股份有限公司) ("China RE") is one of the largest reinsurance groups in China.

== History and Company Background ==
China Reinsurance Group, which is commonly referred to as China Re, originated from the People's Insurance Company of China, the first insurance company in the People's Republic of China founded in 1949. China Re was co-founded by the Ministry of Finance of the People's Republic of China and Central Huijin Investment Company Limited with a registered capital of RMB36,407,611,085 on 22 August 1996.

== Products and services ==
China Re's main products and services include reinsurance, property insurance, and life insurance. The business serves domestic and international clients, including governments, corporations, and individuals.
