= China Life Insurance Company =

Chinese insurance company

China Life Insurance Company Limited 中国人寿保险股份有限公司

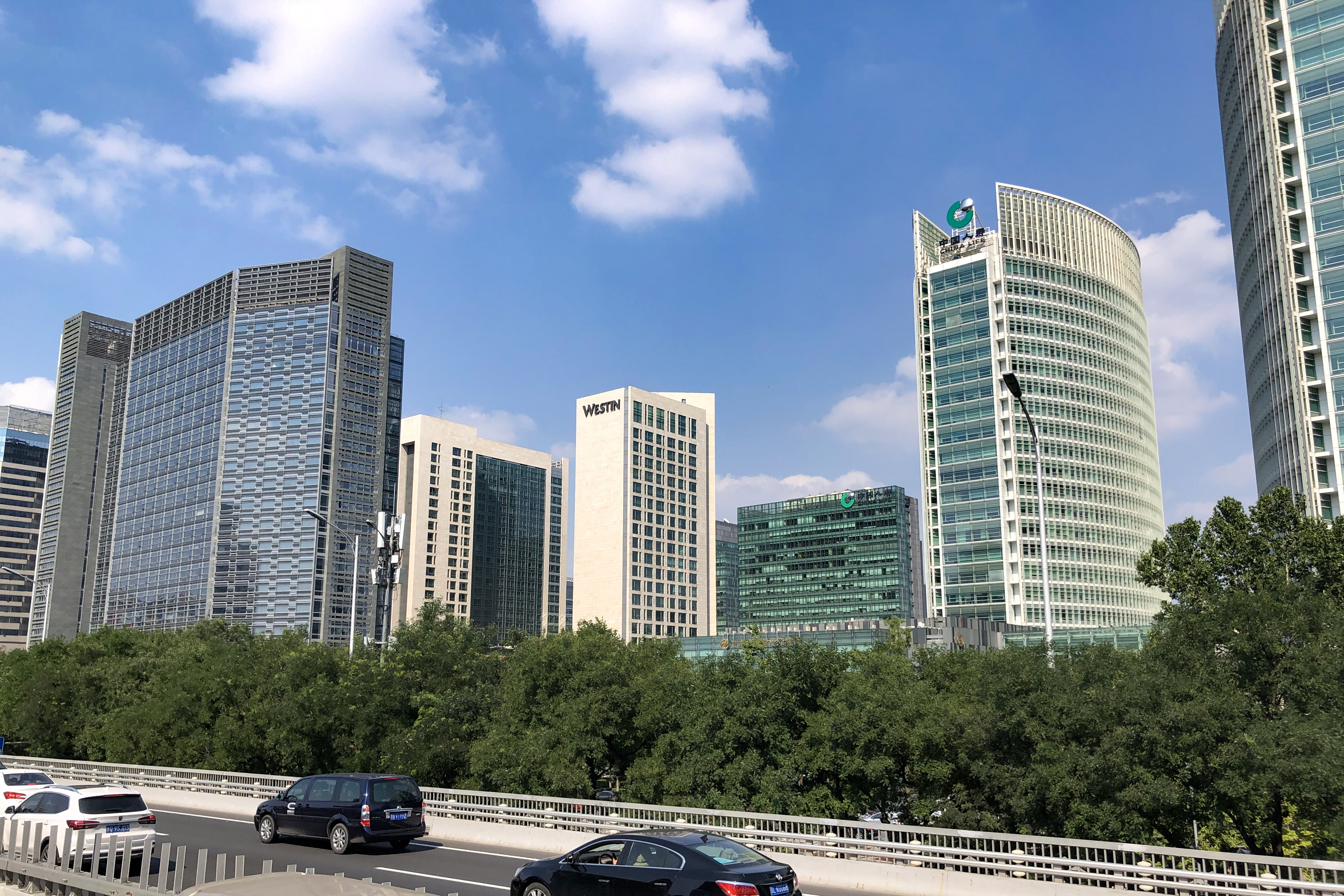
- Headquarters at Beijing Financial Street
- Type: Public; State-owned enterprise
- Traded as: SSE: 601628; SEHK: 2628; Hang Seng Index component; CSI 300
- Industry: Financial services
- Founded: 1949; 77 years ago (as PICC)
- Headquarters: Beijing, China
- Area served: People's Republic of China
- Key people: Dairen Lin (CEO), Chairman: Yang Mingsheng
- Products: Life & health insurance
- Revenue: ▼US$ 139.6 billion (2023)
- Net income: ▼US$ -841.2 million (2023)
- Total assets: US$ 954.0 billion (2023)
- Owner: China Life Insurance Group (68.37%); China Securities Finance (2.03%); Central Huijin (0.42%)
- Number of employees: 176,625 (2023)
- Parent: China Life Insurance Group
- Website: chinalife.com.cn

China Life Insurance Company Limited (short China Life, Chinese: 中国人寿保险; pinyin: Zhōngguó rénshòu bǎoxiǎn) is a Beijing-headquartered China-incorporated company that provides life insurance and annuity products. China Life is ranked No. 94 on Fortune 2015 Global 500 Company list. and is China's largest life insurer by market share, as of April 2023. In 2023, the company was ranked 62nd in the Forbes Global 2000.

== History ==
In 2022, the company announced the de-listing of its American Depository Shares (ADS) and that the last day of trading was intended to be 1 September 2022. The underlying security of the ADS was the H shares, which would continue trading on the Stock Exchange of Hong Kong. The company cited limited trading volume in the ADS and administrative costs as the reasons for the de-listing.

In 2023, China Life Insurance invested $3.5 billion in Honghu Private Securities Investment Fund. The same amount was invested by New China Life Insurance. The fund will aim to improve capital utilization efficiency and increase long-term investment assets.

China Life Insurance Company continues to operate in Russia as of 2025, despite the international sanctions imposed on the country following its invasion of Ukraine. The company's Russian offices remain active, and it has advertised for new employees in the region. This ongoing presence has raised ethical questions, as Russia's actions and war crimes in Ukraine, including civilian casualties and infrastructure destruction, have been widely condemned.

== See also ==
- People's Insurance Company of China
