= People's Insurance Company of China =

Chinese insurance company

The People's Insurance Company (Group) of China Limited
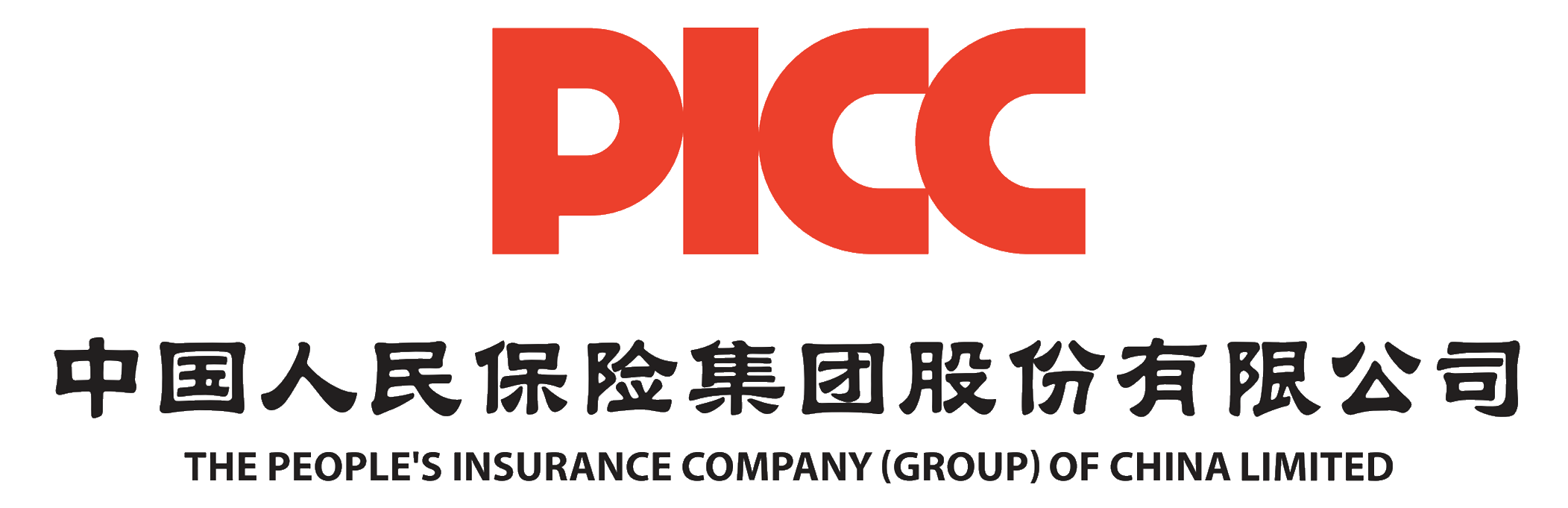

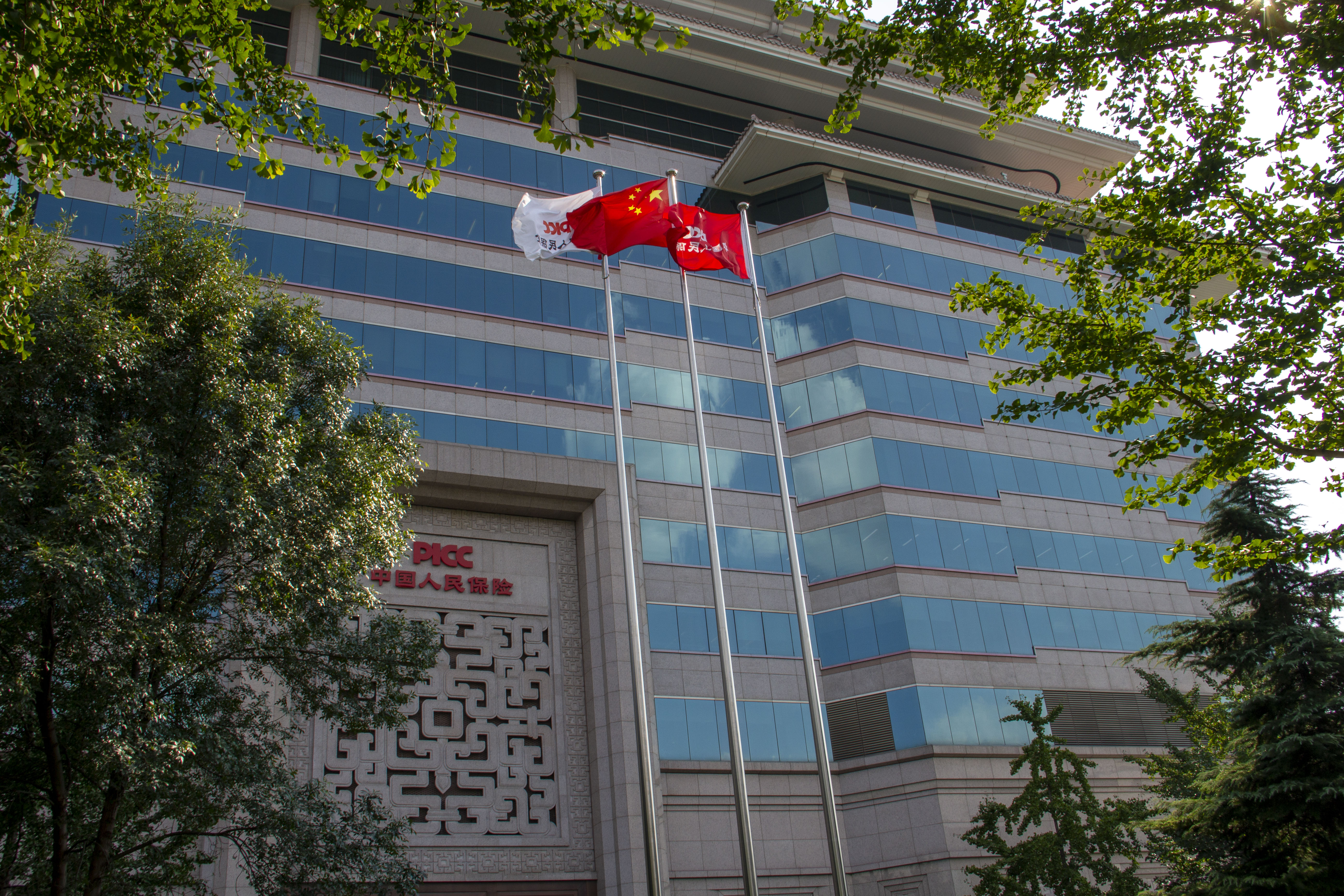
- Headquarters in Beijing
- Trade name: People's Insurance Company of China
- Formerly: PICC Holding Company
- Company type: State-owned enterprise
- Traded as: SSE: 601319 (A share); SEHK: 1339 (H share); CSI 100 component; SSE 50 component
- ISIN: CNE100003F27; CNE100001MK7
- Industry: insurance
- Founded: 1949
- Founder: Chinese Government
- Headquarters: China People's Insurance Building, Beijing, China
- Area served: Mainland China, Hong Kong, etc.
- Services: life and non-life insurance
- Revenue: ▲RMB499 billion (2018)
- Net income: ▼RMB13 billion (2018)
- Total assets: ▲RMB1032 billion (2018)
- Total equity: ▲RMB153 billion (2018)
- Owner: Ministry of Finance (67.60%)
- Parent: Ministry of Finance
Subsidiaries
PICC Asset Management	(100.00%)
PICC Capital Investment Management	(100.00%)
PICC Life	(71.077%)
PICC Property and Casualty	(68.98%)

Chinese name
- Simplified Chinese: 中国人民保险集团股份有限公司
- Traditional Chinese: 中國人民保險集團股份有限公司
- Hanyu Pinyin: Zhōngguó rénmíng bǎoxiǎn jítuán gǔfèn yǒuxiàn gōngsī
Transcriptions
Standard Mandarin
- Hanyu Pinyin: Zhōngguó rénmíng bǎoxiǎn jítuán gǔfèn yǒuxiàn gōngsī
- Website: picc.com
- Footnotes / references In consolidated financial statement. Financial reports prepared in IFRS. Net income and equity excluded minority interest

The People's Insurance Company (Group) of China Limited, known as PICC Group or just PICC, is a Chinese listed insurer. The Chinese Central Government is the controlling shareholder.

The group contains the major subsidiaries: PICC Asset Management, PICC Life as well as PICC Property and Casualty (PICC P&C). The latter also listed on the stock exchange.

== History ==
PICC was founded in 1949 as The People's Insurance Company of China (PICC; Chinese: 中国人民保险公司), as a subsidiary of the People's Bank of China. However, it was reported that PICC was disestablished in 1950. The People's Bank of China provided insurance directly, except from years 1952 to 1959, which the service was provided by the Ministry of Finance (MOF) instead. In 1965, PICC was re-established. In 1983, it was separated from the People's Bank of China as a separate entity that under the supervision of the State Council of the People's Republic of China. In 1985, People's Bank of China was the regulator, while the MOF supervised the financial reporting of the company; the State Planning Commission of the People's Republic of China was the state planner of the whole industry.

In 1996, it became a holding company, as People's Insurance Company (Group) of China (Chinese: 中国人民保险（集团）公司). Three subsidiaries were formed, as property insurer, life insurer and reinsurer respectively. However, in 1998–99, China Life and China Re were spin-off from the group, while the overseas businesses, belongs to yet another former subsidiary, now known as China Taiping Insurance Group Limited (parent company of listed company China Taiping Insurance Holdings). After the split, The property insurer of the group assumed as the new holding company of PICC group, and named The People's Insurance Company of China again. The regulator of the company, China Insurance Regulatory Commission, also established in 1998.

A new subsidiary PICC Property and Casualty (PICC P&C) was established in July 2003 (effective date backdated to September 2002) from the former property and casualty insurance division of the PICC Group. PICC Group divested of insurance responsibilities, re-organized itself into PICC Holding Company (Chinese: 中国人保控股公司) at the same time. PICC P&C was first established as a subsidiary in 1996 but disestablished and merged back in 1999. PICC P&C became a listed company in November 2003.

PICC Holding reverted to the name People's Insurance Company Group of China (Chinese: 中国人民保险集团公司) in 2007. The company also re-incorporated as a joint stock company with limited liabilities in 2009, as The People's Insurance Company (Group) of China Limited (Chinese: 中国人民保险集团股份有限公司). In 2012, PICC's H shares were listed on the Stock Exchange of Hong Kong. It was followed by the A shares in 2018 on the Shanghai Stock Exchange. US-based multinational insurer American International Group (AIG) was the cornerstone investor in the 2012 IPO, as well as in 2003 for the IPO of the subsidiary PICC P&C.

== Businesses ==
PICC has branch offices in London and New York as well as in the cities and towns of China.

PICC is selected by Fortune magazine as part of Fortune Global 500 since 2010. As of 2019 edition, the company was ranked 121st. The company also part of the Forbes magazine's Forbes Global 2000. As of 2019 edition, the company was ranked 155th.

=== PICC Property and Casualty ===
PICC's subsidiary, PICC Property and Casualty (PICC P&C) is China's largest issuer of Property and casualty insurance. It is licensed to provide all major lines of insurance except life insurance. It is the designated agent within the Mainland China for most international insurance companies. As of 2018, the market share of PICC P&C in its sector is 33.0%. According to S&P Global Ratings citing China Insurance Regulatory Commission, PICC P&C's market share (by direct premium) in property and casualty insurance in the first half of year 2017 was 34.0% and ranked the first. The second was Pingan Insurance (19.6%).

=== The People's Insurance Company of China (Hong Kong) ===
In Hong Kong, PICC has another subsidiary The People's Insurance Company of China (Hong Kong), Limited (Chinese: 中國人民保險（香港）有限公司) for 75.00% stake. Fellow listed company Asia Financial Holdings is a minority shareholder as of 2018. That subsidiary was formerly known as Peterson Insurance Company Limited (Chinese: 德誠保險有限公司) as well as Guangdong Asia Insurance Company Limited (Chinese: 粵海亞洲保險有限公司) before acquired by PICC in 2002 from Guangdong Holdings. It provides non-life insurance.

=== PICC Life Insurance ===
In 2005, PICC formed a Sino-foreign joint venture PICC Life Insurance (Chinese: 中国人民人寿保险股份有限公司). Japanese insurer Sumitomo Life took 29% stake, followed by Hong Kong listed company Asia Financial Holdings (Hong Kong is considered as foreign investor in Mainland Chinese laws) and Thai listed company Bangkok Bank for 10% each. However, after several capital increases, PICC owned PICC Life for 71.077% stake directly, plus additional 8.615% stake via non wholly owned subsidiary PICC P&C and 0.308% stake via wholly owned subsidiary PICC Asset Management as of 31 December 2018. The foreign investors only owned a combined 20% stake.

The joint venture would sell insurance products, including savings-oriented endowment insurance policies. As of 2018, the market share of PICC Life in its life insurance sector is 3.6%. While according to S&P Global Ratings, PICC Life's market share (by policy written) in life insurance market in the first half of year 2017 was 4.3% and ranked 4th (10th in 2016).

The insurance financial strength rating of PICC Life is A2 (as of 2019), according to Moody's Investors Service.

PICC Life also acquired 4.98% stake of Industrial Bank in 2012. PICC via PICC Life and PICC P&C owned a combined 10.87% stake of the bank directly and indirectly at that time as the second largest shareholder. PICC also nominated Li Liangwen (Chinese: 李良温; pinyin: Lǐ Liángwēn), President of PICC Life at that time, as a director of Industrial Bank in 2013. He was replaced by Fu Anping (Chinese: 傅安平; pinyin: Fù Ānpíng) in both positions. Since 2016, PICC also owned a minority stake in China Merchants Securities. Chen Zhigang (Chinese: 陈志刚; pinyin: Chén Zhìgāng), vice-president of PICC Life, also nominated as a non-executive director in 2017.

=== PICC Health Insurance ===
PICC Group has another subsidiary PICC Health Insurance Company Limited (Chinese: 中国人民健康保险股份有限公司). In the first half of year 2017, the market share (by policy written) of PICC Health in life insurance market was 1.0%, ranked the 19th according to S&P Global Ratings.

Founded in 2005, PICC Health was a joint venture with German insurer DKV (for 19% stake; DKV is part of Ergo Group, itself owned by Munich Re) and other investors. However, as of 2018, DKV owned 2.2174% shares of PICC Health. Another Chinese company Capital Airport Holding owned 2.3342% shares. The rest of the shares of PICC Health were owned by PICC Group (for 69.3239%) and its subsidiaries, such as PICC P&C for 24.7262% and another subsidiary for 1.3983%.

=== PICC Asset Management ===
PICC Asset Management ("PICC AM") is the investment arm of the company. This subsidiary is responsible for managing PICC's non-Renminbi assets, channelling cross-border investments, and handling the company's overseas investment.

=== PICC Capital ===
PICC Capital Investment Management Company Limited ("PICC Capital"), a wholly owned subsidiary of the People's Insurance Group of China, was established in July 2009. PICC Capital is the sole alternative investment platform of PICC Group, and the first asset manager in China's insurance industry that specializes in alternative investment. PICC Capital takes a major role in strategic asset allocation and strategic resource acquisition for PICC Group. Leveraging on PICC Group's brand, network and channels, PICC Capital provides financial resources to local governments and corporates by making investments in infrastructure, energy, inclusive financing, healthcare, technology incubation, etc., through debt investment and equity investment.

PICC Capital makes equity investments through its wholly owned subsidiary PICC Capital Equity Investment Company Limited ("PICC PE"). Approved by China Insurance Regulatory Commission in 2017, PICC PE is the sole private equity investment platform within PICC Group, and one of the sixteen PE fund managers in China sponsored by insurance capital. PICC PE currently manages an RMB 3bn PICC Health Care Fund.

=== PICC Re ===
PICC Group, via PICC Reinsurance, provided reinsurance service to its listed subsidiary PICC P&C. PICC Reinsurance (PICC Re; Chinese: 人保再保险股份有限公司) itself is a joint venture of PICC Group and its subsidiary PICC P&C in a 51:49 ratio.

== Headquarters ==
The headquarters of the company is located in China People's Insurance Building (or transliterated as PICC Building), in Xicheng District, Beijing. There are other office buildings that are named after PICC, such as in Guangzhou and Chongqing (PICC Life Insurance Building).

== Shareholders ==
PICC issued two classes of ordinary shares: A share and H share. The latter only traded outside Mainland China. Despite residents in Mainland China can buy the H shares of PICC via Shanghai-Hong Kong Stock Connect and Shenzhen-Hong Kong Stock Connect, and vice versa for foreigners buying A shares.

The Ministry of Finance of the People's Republic of China (MOF) is the controlling shareholder of the company, for 67.60% of the total shares as of 31 December 2018. The MOF also significantly owned fellow financial service companies: the Industrial and Commercial Bank of China, the Agricultural Bank of China, the Bank of Communications, China Cinda Asset Management and China Re, etc. The state pension fund: the National Social Security Fund (NSSF) also owned 8.60% + 1.19% total shares of the company (NSSF owned both A and H shares of the company) as of 2018. It was announced that MOF would transferred an additional 6.76% total shares of PICC to the NSSF in 2019.

Other notable investors of PICC included the US-based multinational insurer American International Group (AIG), which owned 2.52% of the total shares (12.76% of the H shares) of PICC, as of 2018. However, AIG sold all their stake in February 2019. AIG also sold most of their stake in the subsidiary PICC P&C in 2005–06.

The H shares of the company is the constituent of Hang Seng China Enterprises Index as of January 2020. While the A shares of the company is the constituents of Hang Seng China 50 Index, CSI 300 Index (and the subset the blue chip index CSI 100), SSE 180 Index (and the subset blue chip index SSE 50 since June 2019), etc., as of January 2020.
