= Ashima (film) =

1964 Chinese musical film

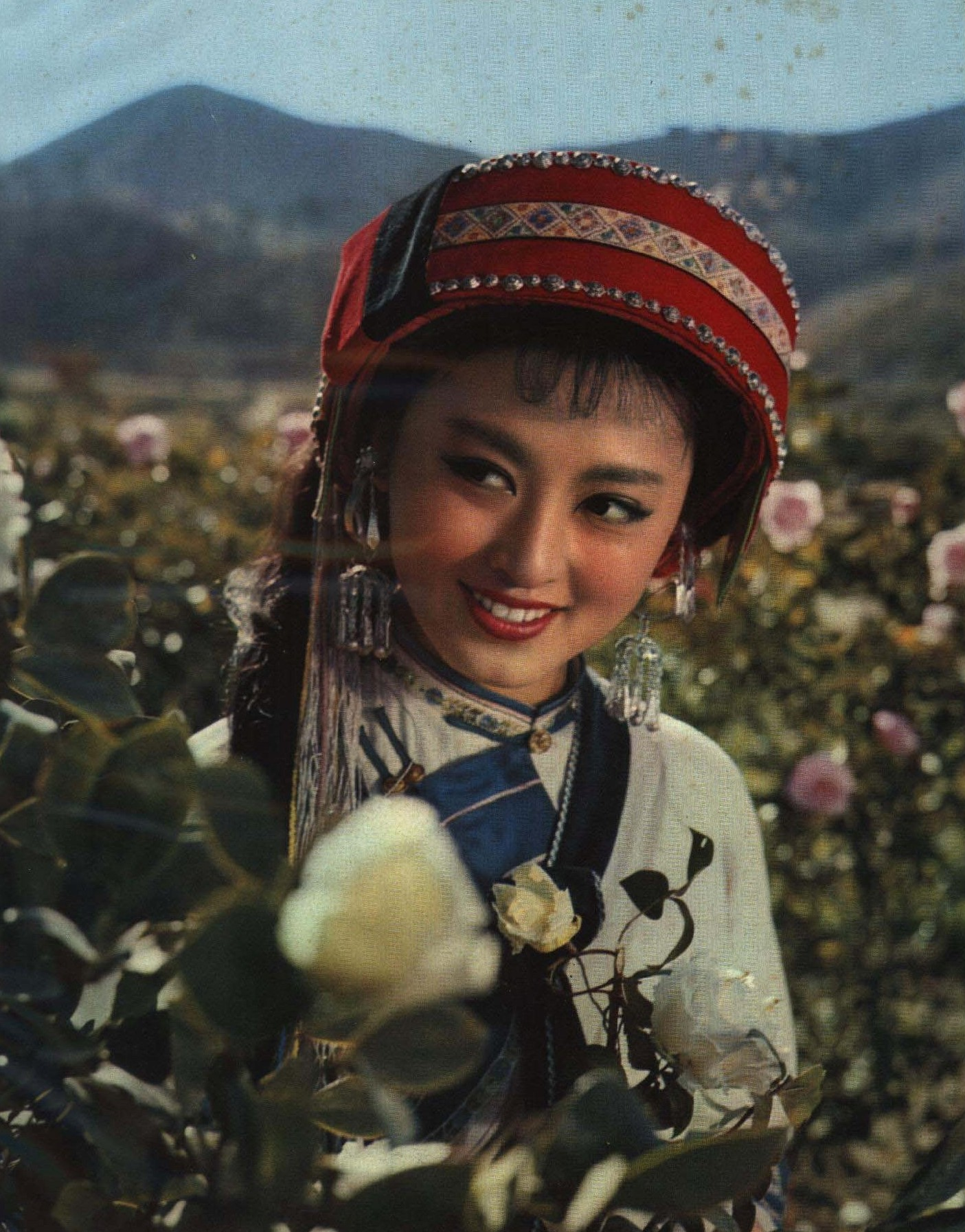
- Yang Likun
- Directed by: Liu Qiong
- Written by: Ge Yan; Liu Qiong
- Based on: Ashima
- Starring: Yang Likun; Bao Sier; Han Fei; Cui Chaoming
- Cinematography: Xu Qi
- Edited by: Chen Xiangxing
- Music by: Luo Zongxian
- Production company: Shanghai Haiyan Film Studio
- Release dates: 1964 (first screening); 1979 (general release)
- Running time: 90 minutes
- Country: China
- Language: Mandarin

Ashima (Chinese: 阿诗玛; pinyin: Āshīmǎ) is a 1964 Chinese musical film directed by Liu Qiong for the Shanghai Haiyan Film Studio. Adapted from a narrative poem of the Sani people, a branch of the Yi people in Yunnan, it tells the tragic story of the lovers Ashima and Ahei, played by Yang Likun and Bao Sier. It has been described as the first musical made in the People's Republic of China in colour and widescreen with stereo sound. The film was criticized during the Cultural Revolution and was not released nationally until 1979. It won a dance film award at a festival in Santander, Spain, in 1982, and a 4K restoration premiered at the San Sebastián International Film Festival in 2025.

== Plot ==
In the Sani country of Yunnan, the young woman Ashima and the shepherd Ahei fall in love at a village festival. Azhi, the son of the local headman Rebubala, desires Ashima. He sends the matchmaker Hairi to Ashima's home with gifts, but her mother refuses the proposal, and Ashima drives the matchmaker out. While Ahei is away tending his flock, Rebubala's men abduct Ashima. She throws a camellia flower, a token of her love for Ahei, into a stream, and the stream flows backward to carry it to him. Ahei rides home and pursues the abductors to Rebubala's house, where Ashima has refused to give in to Azhi's threats and bribes.

Ahei defeats Azhi in a singing contest, and after a display of Ahei's skill with his bow, Rebubala's family is forced to release Ashima. As the couple ride home, Azhi releases a flood that sweeps Ashima away. She is transformed into a rock in the Stone Forest, and Ahei and the villagers call her name, which returns to them as an echo.

== Cast ==
- Yang Likun as Ashima
- Bao Sier as Ahei
- Han Fei
- Cui Chaoming

The singing voices of Ashima and Ahei were provided by Du Lihua and Hu Songhua.

== Background ==
Ashima is a long narrative poem of the Sani that was passed down orally and written down in 1953. A version compiled by Huang Tie and others became the model for later adaptations of the story in music, dance and other art forms. The compilers' notes recorded differing accounts of whether Ashima and Ahei were siblings or lovers. The film presents them as lovers.The poem has been translated into languages including English, French, German, Spanish, Russian, Japanese and Korean, and in 2006 it was included in the first batch of China's national list of intangible cultural heritage.

== Production ==
The film was produced by the Shanghai Haiyan Film Studio. Liu Qiong, an actor who had become a director, carried out extensive research and fieldwork for the project. The screenplay is credited to the composer Ge Yan and Liu. For the title role, the studio cast Yang Likun, a dancer from Yunnan who had become a star in the 1959 film Five Golden Flowers. She was 21 at the time of the film.

The film was photographed by Xu Qi, edited by Chen Xiangxing, and scored by Luo Zongxian. It was shot on location in Yunnan, including at the Stone Forest in Shilin. Xu later recalled that the film's overseas release had been arranged before its crew was confirmed. The scholar Cui Zhou cites this as evidence that international markets shaped the production of ethnic minority films in the period. The film is described as the first musical made in the People's Republic of China in colour and widescreen with stereo sound.

== Release and suppression ==
Ashima was first screened in 1964. It was then shelved for years after Jiang Qing, the wife of Mao Zedong, singled it out for criticism. During the Cultural Revolution, it and Five Golden Flowers were deemed "poisonous weeds" and banned, and Yang Likun became a target of criticism. The media scholar Shenshen Cai writes that Yang was later diagnosed with schizophrenia "resulting from the persecution inflicted upon her during the Cultural Revolution".

After visiting Shilin, the writer Chen Huangmei published the article "Ashima, Where Are You?" in the People's Daily on 3 September 1978, which drew renewed public attention to Yang's case. On 25 October 1978, officials from Yunnan informed Yang of the decision to rehabilitate her. The film was released nationally in 1979.

== Reception and legacy ==
In 1982, Ashima won a dance film award at the international music and dance film festival in Santander. The scholar Cui Zhou groups it with Five Golden Flowers as a socialist-era ethnic minority film that circulated beyond the domestic market.

In 2025, the Shanghai Film Technology Plant and the Bologna laboratory L'Immagine Ritrovata completed a 4K restoration of the film with a new 5.1 soundtrack. The restoration had its world premiere at the 73rd San Sebastián International Film Festival in September 2025. The film was also screened in a programme of Shanghai literary adaptations presented by the Hong Kong Film Archive with the Shanghai Film Museum and the Shanghai Film Archive. Reviewing the restoration for DMovies, Victor Fraga praised the film's vivid visuals and settings but called its story "infantile" and its plot devices "primitive".

=== Accolades ===
Year	Award	Category	Result	Ref.
1982	International Music and Dance Film Festival, Santander	Best Dance Film	Won	
