= Five Golden Flowers =

1959 Chinese romantic musical film

- Directed by: Wang Jiayi
- Written by: Zhao Jikang; Wang Gongpu
- Starring: Mo Zijiang; Yang Likun
- Production company: Changchun Film Group Corporation
- Release date: 1959
- Running time: 95 minutes
- Country: China
- Language: Mandarin

Five Golden Flowers (Chinese: 五朶金花; pinyin: Wǔ duo jīnhuā) is a 1959 Chinese romantic musical film directed by Wang Jiayi and produced by Changchun Film Studio. The screenplay was written by Zhao Jikang and Wang Gongpu. Set in the Dali City in Yunnan Province, the film is about a Bai ethnic youth, Ah Peng, searching for his beloved ethnic girl Jin Hua (Golden Flower). Made during the Great Leap Forward, the film celebrates socialist construction and agricultural collectivization. The theme song of the film "By the Butterfly Spring," composed by musician Lei Zhenbang, was one of the most well-known folk songs in China. The film was produced and released in 1959. It received exuberant responses from audiences and was exported to 46 countries after its debut. During the Cultural Revolution, it was banned and attacked by Jiang Qing for promoting romanticism. In 1978, the film was re-released. At the Second Asian-African Film Festival in Cairo in 1960, the film won the best director and best actress awards. In the 2000 Changchun Film Festival, Five Golden Flowers won first place in the "Top 10 Chinese Films of the Century" selection.

== Plot ==
Dali in March is sunny and comfortable. Ah Peng is a Bai ethnic minority youth from Jianchuan county in Dali Bai Autonomous Prefecture. On the opening day of Dali's March Fair, Ah Peng is on his way to a horse racing. Along the way, he meets a group of girls whose wagon breaks down by the roadside. Ah Peng helps them fix the wagon, but that almost causes him to miss the horse racing. Leaving in a hurry, Ah Peng drops his tools. One of the girls, Jin Hua, is impressed by Ah Peng's skill and kindness. She carefully puts the tools in her handcrafted pouch.

Ah Peng was late for the race. He sped up and surpassed his competitors. Among the crowd of spectators, Jin Hua and her friends cheer for Ah Peng. After Ah Peng wins the horse racing, Jin Hua finds him and gives him her pouch. Staring at Jin Hua's golden embroidery, Ah Peng falls in love with her.

By the Butterfly Spring, Jin Hua and Ah Peng express their love for one another by singing a Bai duet. Ah Peng gives Jin Hua his steel knife, which symbolizes his faithfulness. Jin Hua promises Ah Peng to meet at the same place at next year's March Fair. She tells Ah Peng her name, Jin Hua.

A year later, Jin Hua does not show up at the Butterfly Spring. Without the girl's surname, Ah Peng starts looking for her in the Cang Mountain. He comes across two cultural workers who come to collect the region's songs and paint the natural sceneries. Ah Peng offers to be their coachman. On their way, Ah Peng realizes that Jin Hua is a common name for local Bai women.

The first Jin Hua they meet is a manure collector. Although she is not the right person, Ah Peng picks up a sickle in the lake for her. The second Jin Hua is a stockyard worker who was extremely busy helping a cattle give birth. Eager to see Jin Hua, Ah Peng starts singing their song outside the window. Misunderstanding Ah Peng's purpose, the second Jin Hua throws a bucket of water at him.

Without feeling discouraged, Ah Peng continues his journey in the company of the two cultural workers. Arriving at the foot of the Cang Mountain, he hears people calling out the name "Jin Hua". Ah Peng soon joins the rescue team and saves a group of female foundry workers on a hillside from a bear attack. The third Jian Hua is one of the foundry workers. She shows Ah Peng a piece of ore that they discovered. Ah Peng, who used to be an experienced foundry worker, estimates the ore contains up to 60% iron.

Ah Peng and the two cultural workers then arrive at the commune's tractor station where a wedding is taking place. The bride, also named Jin Hua, is a tractor driver. However, Ah Peng mistakes the bride for his Jin Hua. Heartbroken, he goes back to the Butterfly Spring to reminisce about the day they met.

Ah Peng leaves the tractor station and runs into the Jin Hua whom he rescued from the bear attack. She just has a quarrel with her husband about the low production of iron. Ah Peng, who is a warm-hearted youth, decides to help her. He devotes himself to working in the foundry. The production of iron increases rapidly because of his expertise.

Jin Hua at the foundry speaks highly of Ah Peng. She also takes care of Ah Peng after he lost his love. Her husband, the foundry director Yang becomes jealous and he asks Jin Hua, the vice-president of the commune, to settle this problem. It turns out Ah Peng's beloved girl is the vice-president of the commune.

With the help of Jin Hua from the foundry, Ah Peng finally finds the girl of his dream and clears up the misunderstandings. Ah Peng and Jin Hua reunite at the Butterfly Spring. Other girls named Jin Hua and their lovers gather around them to celebrate the moment with a final chorus.

== Cast ==
- Yang Likun as Jin Hua (vice-president of the commune)
- Mo Zijiang as Ah Peng
- Sun Jingzhen as Jin Hua (manure collector)
- Tan Yaozhong as Jin Hua (stockyard worker)
- Wang Suya as Jin Hua (foundry worker)
- Zhu Yijin as Jin Hua (tractor driver)
- Huang Zhong as painter Meng
- Yan Jie as musician Li
- Zhang Xiong as uncle
- Li Wenwei as grandpa
- Wang Chunying as foundry director Yang
- Zhao Yuqing as fisherwoman

== Production ==
=== Background ===
==== Great Leap Forward ====
In 1958, Changchun Film Studio's workshops and canteens all turned into studios. Big-character posters that discussed film scripts were hung on every wall. In the same year, Changchun Film Studio launched 31 "satellite" films. No one dared to say anything about the poor artistic quality of those films, because saying that demonstrated an "incorrect attitude" (taidu wenti) and "incorrect standpoint" (lichang wenti). In the first two years of the Great Leap Forward, 180 fiction films were produced. The number exceeded the total film output (171 films) from 1949 to 1957. A new genre called "documentary art film" that projects a new utopian society emerged as the style of the Great Leap Forward. Chen Huangmei, deputy head of the Film Bureau, identified the new genre as a product of the frenetic moment. During the production, filmmakers sought to follow the mass line by shortening the production period and reducing the budget. The pursuit of quantity at the expense of quality led to a series of problems such as limited subject matter and uniform theme that lacked creativity and technique. In a meeting with representatives of literary and art on May 3, 1959, the Premier, Zhou Enlai made a speech titled "On the question of cultural and arts work walking with two legs" (Guanyu wenhua yishu gongzuo liangtiaotui zoulu de wenti), in which he proposed ten issues for literature and arts work to "walk on two legs". He put forward a harmony between ten seemingly opposite concepts (motivation and pleasure, goal and capability, ideology and aesthetics, romanticism and realism, learning Marxist theory and putting into practice, basic training and literary accomplishment, politics and welfare, labor and health, innovation and scientific evidence, originality and compatibility). Zhou Enlai corrected the mistakes of privileging ideology over aesthetics. In his words, "Ideology should lead, but that doesn't mean that aesthetics is not important. Ideology is conveyed through aesthetic forms." Advocating Zhou Enlai's "walking on two legs" policy, the Film Bureau advised filmmakers to slow down the production and improve the quality of films.

==== 10th anniversary of the People's Republic of China ====
The Central Secretariat in 1958 pointed out that the film production in 1959 shouldered the task of producing "gift presentation films" (xianli pian) for the tenth anniversary of the founding of the PRC. Xia Yan, who was appointed in 1954 as Vice Minister of Culture, made a report on "gift presentation films" in 1958. He emphasized the role of the gift presentation films to "introduce and propagate to the world the Chinese revolution and socialist construction". To accomplish this goal, Xia Yan stressed the requirements in both the political and the aesthetic value of the films. Zhou Enlai also reintroduced the importance of artistic creation in film production, stimulating the filmmaker's passion to explore new themes and styles. In 1959, the Ministry of Culture selected 36 films as the official gift presentation films to commemorate the tenth anniversary of the PRC. A number of gift presentation films, The Lin Family Shop (Linjia puzi, 1959), Five Golden Flowers (1959), Nie Er (1959), Lin Zexu (1959), were considered masterpieces of filmmaking.

=== Creation ===
After viewing several gift presentation films, Zhou Enlai was disappointed that they lacked "a sense of beauty, joviality and vivacity". He suggested Xia Yan find a joyful and lighthearted subject matter. To break from the serious topics dealing with revolutionary and war, Xia Yan instructed the Propaganda Department of the Yunnan Provincial Committee to produce a comedy film that features singing and dancing and the picturesque landscape in Yunnan, a film that was based on the romantic love story of the Bai minority people in Dali's Cang Mountain and Erhai lake. Xia Yan emphasized that the director should avoid the explicit representation of political slogans, class struggle, and the leadership of the Chinese Communist Party in order to exhibit this film in "capitalist nations that were harsh in censoring socialist messages". The beautiful scenery in Dali and the robust personalities of the minority people were sufficient to convey the success of China's socialist construction. Following Xia Yan's instruction, director Wang Jiayi and cinematographer Wang Chunquan went to Yunnan Province to produce the film Five Golden Flowers.

=== Writing ===
The screenplay, written by Zhao Jikang and Wang Gongpu, was originally titled Duoduo Jinhua and featured twelve golden flowers. After reading, Xia Yan reduced the number of golden flowers to five. Xia Yan in his comments on the script encouraged the scenarist to liberate their thoughts and try to keep the story entertaining. Five Golden Flowers was made with an "international imagination". Xia Yan hoped that the film would be shown in many countries and propagate the achievements since the founding of new China. Chen Huangmei advised the scenarist to enhance the comedic elements of the play and to portray the moral quality of the protagonist through a series of misunderstandings. He reminded the film crew to avoid shooting the big-character posters of the Great Leap Forward that might appear on walls. Xia Yan and Chen Huangmei reviewed many drafts of the script. The final draft was modified and approved by Xia Yan in mid-May, 1959. He required the director to finish shooting before October, 1959.

== Minority Film ==
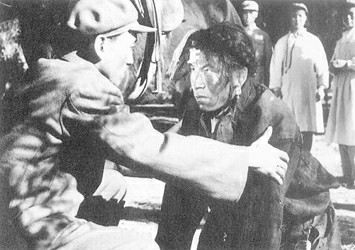
Jampa and PLA soldier

Minority film is a relatively new genre that had an appeal to China's audience in the 1950s and 1960s. Ethnic minorities in China mainly include "Mongols, Tibetans, and Uighurs in the north and northwest, the Miao, Yi, Zhuang, and Bai minorities in the southwest, and Koreans and Manchus in the northeast". The exotic settings allowed filmmakers to explore the less represented subjects, such as love, oppression, and class exploitation, which extends beyond ethnic boundaries. Serfs (Nongnu, 1963), a minority film set in the northwest region, presents the suffering of the oppressed Tibetan peasants. Jampa was a Tibetan serf. Growing up, he was constantly exploited by his master and became extremely introverted, refusing to speak to anyone. Jampa's life was saved by a People's Liberation Army soldier who died in the rescue. The Han soldier is symbolic of advanced culture and ideology, and savior of ethnic minority groups. After years of silence, the first words that Jampa uttered was "Chairman Mao," when he directed his gaze towards a portrait of the leader on the wall. The deserts of the northwest made the portrayal of class struggle palpable to the Han audiences. Serfs further achieved a degree of realism by casting a large number of "non-professional actors/actresses and actual former serfs. They played the roles of protagonists, integrating their real identities with their cinematic roles." The film promotes the virtues of the Han Chinese by showing that the Communist revolution in China saved the entire Chinese nation from class exploitation.

In contrast to the violent reality in Serfs, minority films set in the southwest region "routinely featured picturesque landscape, melodious music and songs, beautiful costumes, exotic customs and romantic love". Typical of the southwest genre is Five Golden Flowers. Set in Yunnan, a frontier region of southwest China. It is a musical version of a love story that avoids the depiction of class struggle. To stay close to the reality of the Bai minority, "the representation of songs and dances in Five Golden Flowers corresponds to the reality that singing was an important and integral part of the Bai people's daily life expression and communication." The Han musician in the film has a line, "There is a variety of folk songs here. Even the song that expresses anger is enchanting (zheli de minge ke zhen fengfu, lian maren de ge dou name haoting)." The line indicates the Bai people's "singing while living (ban ge er ju)" lifestyle. The Bai people dressed in colorful costumes with delicate ornaments were engaged in song and dance while they declared their love. Yang Likun, a Yi ethnic actress, played the female protagonist in the film. However, the film did not deviate from the mainstream message of the political campaign by "projecting a utopian vista for community and society". Characters were figured as "model workers" who were fully committed to socialist construction. Minority films in China provided journeys to the infinite landscape in the northwest or the "tropical climes" in the southwest, a world that was seen as foreign to the Han audiences. All the ethnic characters in minorities films speak Mandarin instead of dialect in order to achieve a national unity and bridge the linguistic gap.

== Music ==
=== List of Songs ===
- By the Butterfly Spring (Lyrics: Zhao Jikang, Music: Lei Zhenbang)
- Sing a Shan'ge that Travels through the Wall (Lyrics: Zhao Jikang, Music: Lei Zhenbang)
- Shan'ge of Picking Herbs (Lyrics: Zhao Jikang, Music: Lei Zhenbang)
- Embroidering Apron (Lyrics: Zhao Jikang, Music: Lei Zhenbang)
- March Fair (Lyrics: Zhao Jikang, Music: Huang Hong)

=== By the Butterfly Spring ===
==== Production ====
The romantic theme song By the Butterfly Spring at the beginning and the end of the film is a laudation of the meeting and reunion of Ah Peng and Jin Hua. By the Butterfly Spring is the most classic song from Five Golden Flowers. Lei Zhenbang combined folk songs from Jianchuan County and "dragon tune" (shualong diao) to compose Jin Hua's singing parts. He redesigned the structure of "dragon tune" and cut three notes to emphasize the theme of the song. Ah Peng's singing parts were adapted from "Xishan tune" (xishan diao). His parts were formed by two sentences and an intro. The famous "Xishan tune," as the background material, was recomposed and recreated. The result is a new song structure that echos and fits the film.

==== Lyrics ====
- Jin Hua: Dali in March has beautiful scenery. I come to the Butterfly Spring to comb my hair. Butterflies hover over the flowers to extract honey. Why does little sister comb her hair? Butterflies hover over the flowers to extract honey. Why does little sister comb her hair?

(Ai, Dali sanyue hao fengguang ai. Hudiequan bian hao shuzhuang. Hudie feilai cai huami yo. A Mei shu tou wei na zhuang? Hudie feilai cai huami yo. A Mei shu tou wei na zhuang?)

- Ah Peng: There is clear water in the Butterfly Spring. I throw a stone to test the depth of the water. I want to pick a flower but I am afraid of thorns. My mind keeps wandering.

(Ai, Hudieqan shui qing you qing. Diu ge shitou shi shui shen. You xin zhai hua pa you ci. Paihui xin bu ding a yi yo)

- Jin Hua: Do not be afraid of thorns if you want to pick a flower. Do not ask questions if you want to sing. Do not be afraid of water if you want to cast a net. Show your face so that we can meet.

(Ai, Youxin zhaihua mo pa ci ai. Youxin changge mo duo wen. Youxin sawang mo pa shui yo. Jianmian hao xiangren.)

- Ah Peng: Yang birds fly over the mountain. Bells keep ringing after they leave. After little sister (Jin Hua) gave me the golden pouch, I have fallen in love with you.

(Yangqiao feiguo gaoshan ding. Liuxia yichuan xiangling sheng. A Mei song wo jin hebao yo. Ge shi youqingren a yi yo.)

- Jin Hua: Swallows carry bits of earth in their bills to build nests. Love and hate cannot be expressed by words. Relationship should be like the ever-lasting flowing water. Elder brother (Ah Peng), do not treat it as the transient morning dew.

(Yanzi xian yi wei zuowo. Youqing wuqing kou nanshuo. Xiangjiao yao xue chang liushui yo. Zhaolu Ge mo xue a yi yo.)

- Ah Peng: Three generations in my family are blacksmiths. The steel we made does not rust. My heart is as faithful as steel. Little sister, do not misunderstand me. I give this steel knife to little sister. The steel knife will be the best witness. The Cang Mountain may turn into snow and the Erhai lake may dry up, but the steel knife is not easy to break.

(Zuchuan sandai shi tiejiang. Lian de haotie xie bu sheng. Ge xin si gang zui jianzhen. Mei mo kan cuo ren. Song ba gangdao pei Mei shen. Gangdao bian shi hao jianzheng. Cangshan xue hua Erhai Gan. Nan zhe hao gangdao.)

- Jin Hua: Olive is delicious because of its sweet aftertaste. Push aside the moss to take a drink of the mountain stream. Rather than giving promises now, we will meet again next year. Next year when the flowers are blooming and butterflies are flyings, elder brother can come to see me. Find "Jin Hua" at the foot of the Cang Mountain. "Jin Hua" is little sister's name. Find "Jin Hua" at the foot of the Cang Mountain. "Jin Hua" is little sister's name.

(Ganlan haochi huiwei tian. Dakai qingtai he shanquan. Shanmeng haishi xian mo jiang. Xianghui dai mingnian. Mingnian huakai hudie fei. A Ge youxin zai lai hui. Cangshan jiaoxia zhao Jinhua. Jinhua shi A Mei. Cangshan jiaoxia zhao Jinhua. Jinhua shi A Mei.)

== Folklore ==
=== March Fair ===
March Fair (sānyuè jiē) is a tradition in Dali ancient city. It began in the Yonghui era (650–654) of the Tang dynasty. Cultural exchange with southeast Asia countries took place in Nanzhao's Yangjumie city (modern-day Dali ancient city), the politic, culture, and economic center of Yunnan in the Tang dynasty. The emergence of the March Fair is closely related to the introduction of Buddhism to Dali. Also known as Guanyin Fair (guānyīn jiē), the tradition evolves from temple gathering (miàohuì). It develops into the local Bai people's biggest festival of the year. March Fair lasts 7 days in the third lunar month. People from all over the country come to Dali to take part in the events of trading and horse racing, and prize-winning games, and to watch traditional Bai singing and dancing.

== Reception during the Cultural Revolution ==
Five Golden Flowers differs from many other minority films in that it lacks the depiction of the suffering caused by class conflicts, and the representation of the Communist Party as a savior of the exploited peasants. Third Sister Liu (Liu Sanjie, 1960), based on a Zhuang minority folktale, tells the story of a courageous woman rebelling against abuses by landlords. The film not only "combines a series of melodious folk songs with picturesque scenes," but also presents minority peoples as participants in the class struggle. The Zhuang people united in order to overcome the oppression of their class enemy, the landlords. However, Five Golden Flowers focuses on an enjoyable subject matter, simply showing the Bai minority people participating in the construction during the Great Leap Forward and engaging in romantic affairs. During the Cultural Revolution, the film was banned due to its "romantic exuberance," and was labeled as an "anti-socialist poisonous weed" (ducao pian) that glorified feudalism and romanticism.

When Five Golden Flowers was criticized during the Cultural Revolution, actress Yang Likun was accused of being anti-revolutionary. Prior to that time, she had a mental health illness because of an unsuccessful relationship, and she recovered after hospitalization. Before the Cultural Revolution, she starred in another Bai minority film, Ashma (Ashima, 1964). The Ministry of Culture canceled the release of the film in 1965 for it told the story of the dead, did not praise the achievement of the socialist revolution, and glorified "the supremacy of love" (xuanchuan aiqing zhishang). During the Cultural Revolution, Yang Likun was labeled as "black sprouts" (hei miaozi) and "characters of the black line" (heixian renwu). The prosecution and torture she faced in the Cultural Revolution were the cause of her schizophrenia. She was once missing in the frontier town of Zhenyuan. In 1970, she was forced to wear a counter-revolutionary hat, which led to her mental breakdown. In the 30 years that followed, Yang Likun never walked away from the nightmare and did not act in any movie. In 1973, Yang Likun was married to Tang Fenglou, a youth from Shanghai. She gave birth to twin boys the following year. With the help from local government and community, she was rehabilitated in 1978. Yang Likun died on July 21, 2000, at the age of 59 in Shanghai after years of illness. Half of her ashes were buried in Shanghai, the other half in Kunming.

== Legacy ==
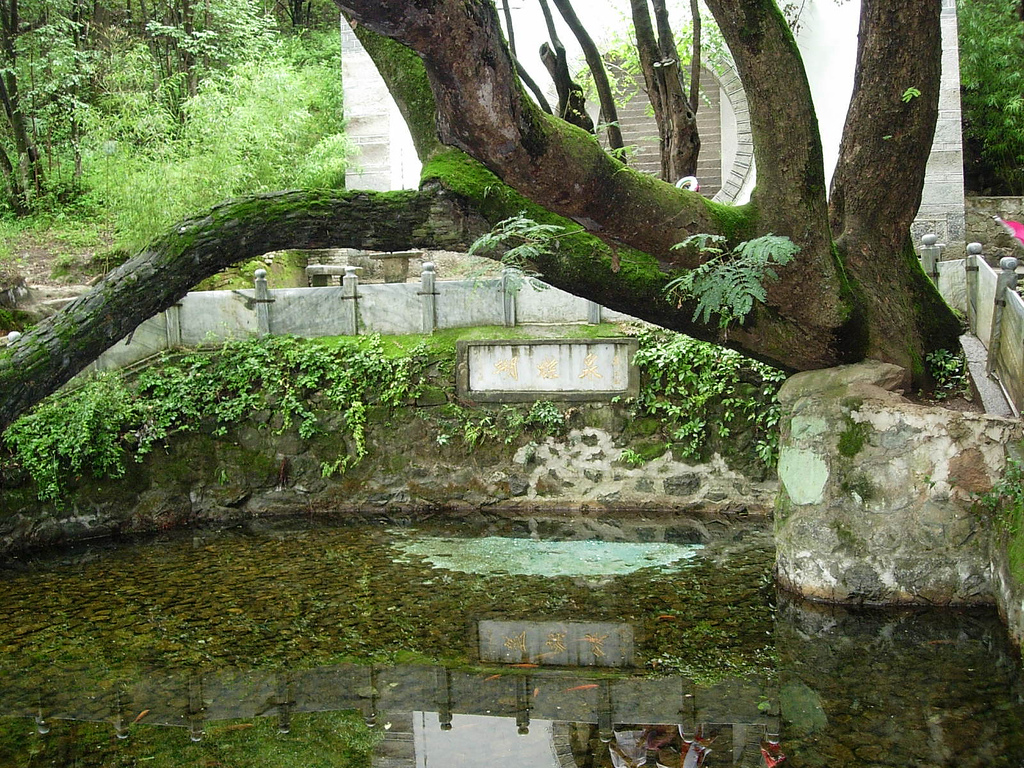
The Butterfly Spring on the slopes of the Cang Mountain range

Travelers and tourists are drawn to the Butterfly Spring in Dali because of the film Five Golden Flowers. Butterfly Spring is situated at the foot of Shenmo Mountain (the first peak of the Cang Mountain) in Yunnan Province, 27 kilometers in the south of Dali ancient city. It covers an area of 50 square meters. Butterfly Spring was turned into a park in 1978, and in 1982 "the Dali Municipal Development Committee invested four million yuan (US$1.3 million at the official exchange rate, approximately US$400,000 at unofficial rates) to develop the park into a tourist site." The park was designed to mirror the famous Butterfly Spring scenes in Five Golden Flowers, which were shot at a studio in Changchun rather than on location. An ancient tree branch above the pool had served as the model for the tree branch behind Jin Huan in the film when she sings by the Butterfly Spring. After the ancient tree died, a fiberglass branch "covered with real bark" was constructed to match the setting of the film.

== Controversy ==
In 1974, the Qujing tobacco factory in Yunnan manufactured "Five Golden Flowers" cigarettes. The factory registered the "Five Golden Flowers" trademark in 1983. On February 5, 2001, scenarists Zhao Jikang and Wang Gongpu filed a lawsuit against the Qujing Tobacco factory, alleging the "Five Golden Flowers" trademark violated their copyright. The Supreme People's Court in Yunnan Province issued the decision that Zhao Jikang and Wang Gongpu's copyright of Five Golden Flowers, the screenplay they wrote and published in 1959, was protected by the law. However, the current Copyright Laws did not make clear the protection of the work's title. "Five Golden Flowers" was the work's title and therefore was not protected by copyright law. Zhao Jikang and Wang Gongpu's allegation that the Qujing tobacco factory's use of "Five Golden Flowers" as their trademark violated their copyright was disapproved.

== Behind the Scenes Preparations ==
- Songs in Five Golden Flowers are "performed by professional singers and lip-synched", Jin Hua's singing part is performed by Zhao Lvzhu, a Bai ethnic singer from Dali.
- One of the reasons Xia Yan selected Wang Jiayi to direct Five Golden Flowers is Wang Jiayi's international outlook. Wang Jiayi studied filmmaking in France for a short period of time and had the "experience of making films with an international audience in mind".
- Director Wang Jiayi took a long time to find the correct actress to play the protagonist Jin Hua. One day, he came to Yunnan Song & Dance Ensemble. A girl who was cleaning the rehearsal room's window caught his attention. The girl was Yang Likun, who was only 16-year-old when she starred in the film.
- Five Golden Flowers was filmed in the midst of the Great Leap Forward. The film crew also took a "leap forward". They finished shooting within 4 months.
- The representation of songs in Five Golden Flowers, "singing by character as solos, duets or in chorus," was considered as a forerunner to ethnic musical film. Inspired by folk music, Lei Zhenbang later composed the theme songs of two other minority films, Third Sister Liu and Ashma.
- The film originally showed that Jin Hua misunderstood Ah Peng and returned the steel knife. Viewing the film, the leader of Changchun Film Studio felt the scene undermined Jin Hua's positive image. The crew then changed the part to Jin Hua's grandpa returning the steel knife to Ah Peng.
- During the filming process, Wang Jiayi gave serious consideration to the moral of the story. He eventually decided that the film should convey the admiration for Bai ethnic minority group, for the community they live, and for those tenacious working people.

== Awards ==
Cairo Second Asia-Africa Film Festival, 1960

- Silver Eagle Awards (best director) — Wang Jiayi
- Silver Eagle Awards (best actress) — Yang Likun

== See also ==
Cinema of China — Early Communist Era
