= Yang Likun =

Chinese actress and dancer (1941–2000)

- 杨丽坤
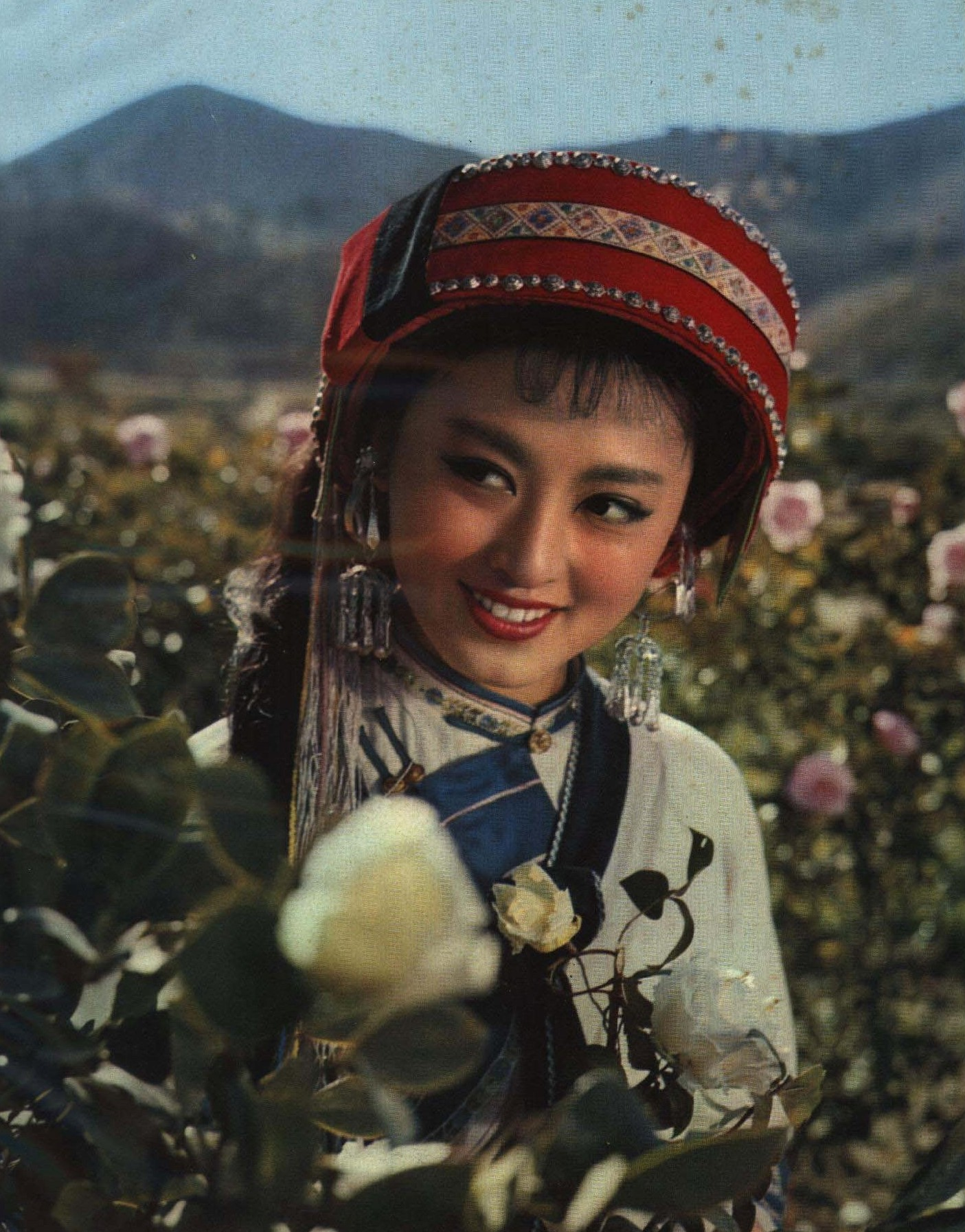
- Yang as Ashima in China Pictorial, January 1964
- Born: 27 April 1941; Mohei, Ning'er County, Yunnan, China
- Died: 21 July 2000 (aged 59); Shanghai, China
- Occupations: Actress; dancer
- Spouse: Tang Fenglou
- Children: 2

Yang Likun (simplified Chinese: 杨丽坤; traditional Chinese: 楊麗坤; pinyin: Yáng Lìkūn; 27 April 1941 – 21 July 2000) was a Chinese actress and dancer of Yi ethnicity. A dancer with the Yunnan Provincial Song and Dance Troupe, she became famous for playing Jin Hua in Five Golden Flowers (1959), for which she won the Silver Eagle Award for Best Actress at the second Afro-Asian Film Festival in Cairo, and for the title role in Ashima (1964). She was persecuted during the Cultural Revolution, during which she suffered a mental breakdown, and she was rehabilitated in 1978.

== Early life ==
Yang was born on 27 April 1941, into a Yi family in the town of Mohei in present-day Ning'er County, Yunnan. Some sources give her year of birth as 1942. She was the ninth child in her family and was known by the nickname Xiao Jiu'er. Her mother died when Yang was about four or five, and she left primary school because of the family's poverty. Her father was imprisoned when she was eight. In 1952, her eldest sister took her to Kunming to live with her second sister, and she was able to return to school.

== Career ==
In 1954, at the age of 12, Yang was spotted at a performance by Hu Zonglin, the head of the Yunnan Provincial Song and Dance Troupe, who recruited her into the troupe. From 1955, she performed in group dances such as Ten Big Sisters and Picking Tea, and she soon became a solo dancer, known for her performance of Spring River Flower Moon Night. In 1961, she toured Burma with the troupe during a visit by Premier Zhou Enlai.

In 1958, as the Ministry of Culture prepared films to mark the tenth anniversary of the People's Republic of China, the writer Xia Yan proposed a musical set among the minority peoples of Dali. In April 1959, the Changchun Film Studio director Wang Jiayi went to Yunnan to look for actresses. Yang was at first passed over because of her family background, but Wang was struck by her natural charm and cast her in the lead role. In Five Golden Flowers, a romantic musical comedy set among the Bai people, she played Jin Hua, a young woman whom the hero searches for after meeting her at a festival.The film was released nationwide in October 1959 and was a popular success. It ran for 24 days in Hong Kong, and it was eventually shown in 46 countries and regions, a record for a Chinese film abroad at the time. At the second Afro-Asian Film Festival in Cairo, Wang won the Silver Eagle Award for Best Director and Yang won the Silver Eagle Award for Best Actress. Then President of Egypt Gamal Abdel Nasser personally invited her to Cairo to receive the award. Yang also met Zhou Enlai and travelled abroad.

In 1964, Yang played the title role in Ashima, a musical directed by Liu Qiong and adapted from a narrative poem of the Sani people. The film has been described as China's first colour widescreen musical with stereo sound. Before its release, Yang suffered a mental illness after a romantic relationship was obstructed, but she recovered after treatment in hospital. In 1965, the Ministry of Culture halted the film's release, reportedly criticizing it for promoting "love above all" and "bourgeois sentiment".

=== Cultural Revolution ===
Ashima had still not been released when the Cultural Revolution began in 1966. Jiang Qing attacked the film, and Yang was labelled a "black line figure" and a "revisionist sprout" and sent to Simao to be criticized by local people. She was later designated an "active counter-revolutionary", was beaten and confined, and suffered a mental breakdown. After her sisters appealed for help, the intervention of Zhou Enlai kept her out of prison, and she was moved to a psychiatric hospital in Chenzhou, Hunan.

After the fall of the Gang of Four in 1976, Yang was still classified as a counter-revolutionary and was being treated in a psychiatric hospital in Shanghai. In 1978, after visiting the Stone Forest in Yunnan, the writer Chen Huangmei published the article "Ashima, Where Are You?" in the People's Daily on September 3. The Wenhui Bao then reported where Yang was being treated, and on 25 October 1978, officials from Yunnan found her in the hospital and read her the decision to rehabilitate her. In the same year, she joined the Shanghai Film Studio and was reunited with her husband and sons.

== Later life and death ==
Ashima was released nationally in 1979, and it won a dance film award at a festival in Santander, Spain, in 1982. In 1982, Yang was named one of China's ten best actresses. Her health declined in her later years. After a cerebral haemorrhage in 1997, she was cared for at home by her husband.

Yang died at her home in Shanghai on the morning of 21 July 2000. More than 300 people attended her memorial service at the Longhua Funeral Parlour on August 5, 2000. Her ashes were divided between tombs in Shanghai and Kunming. The Kunming tomb, in the Celebrities' Garden of the Jinbaoshan Art Cemetery, was completed on 15 January 2001, and features a still from her films and a sculpture of a miniature stone forest.

In May 2009, the county government of Ning'er County decided to rebuild Yang's former residence in Mohei, and the restored residence houses an exhibition on her life and a sculpture of her by her husband. Her younger brother, Yang Kewei, and Jin Yue wrote a biography of her, which was published by the Yunnan People's Publishing House in 2015.

== Personal life ==
After her treatment in Chenzhou, Yang met Tang Fenglou, a 1966 graduate of the Shanghai Foreign Languages Institute who was working at the Fankou lead-zinc mine in Shaoguan, Guangdong, and the two married. Their twin sons were born on 25 May 1974.

== Filmography ==
| Year | Title | Role | Ref. |
|---|---|---|---|
| 1959 | Five Golden Flowers | Jin Hua | |
| 1964 | Ashima | Ashima | |

== Awards ==
| Award | Category | Work | Result | Ref. |
|---|---|---|---|---|
| Second Afro-Asian Film Festival, Cairo | Best Actress (Silver Eagle Award) | Five Golden Flowers | Won | |

== See also ==
- Qin Yi
- Shangguan Yunzhu
- Sun Weishi
