= Patrick Hanan =

New Zealand scholar of Chinese literature

Patrick Dewes Hanan ONZM (4 January 1927 – 26 April 2014) was a New Zealand scholar of Chinese literature who was the Victor S. Thomas Professor of Chinese Literature at Harvard University. A sinologist, he specialised in pre-20th-century vernacular fiction.

== Career ==
Hanan was born in Morrinsville, New Zealand and raised on a farm in the Waikato where his father retired from a career in dentistry. Hanan studied English at Auckland University College before going to England, where he enrolled to study Chinese at the School of Oriental and African Studies at University of London, taking his undergraduate degree in 1953 and beginning his teaching career there. He spent the academic year 1957–58 in Beijing. Soon after completing his doctoral work and receiving his doctoral degree in 1961, he was recruited to teach on a temporary basis at Stanford University in 1961, then a regular position there in 1963. In 1968, he moved to Harvard, where he taught until his retirement at age 70 in 1997. He was chair of the department of East Asian Languages and Director of the Harvard-Yenching Library, among other services.

In the 1999 Queen's Birthday Honours, Hanan was appointed an Officer of the New Zealand Order of Merit, for services to Chinese literature and languages. In 2006, he was conferred with an honorary LittD degree by the University of Auckland.

== Research topic ==
From 1950 to 1953, Hanan studied at the University of London, received a bachelor's degree, and, after graduating, admitted to the University of London's Asian-African college. He taught students, and at the same time writing doctoral dissertation. He chose the title of " Records of the Grand Historian (Shiji)" in the beginning, wanted to study this historical masterpiece from the literary viewpoint. But his supervisor, Walter Simon, reckoned that there are too many people studying this book, suggesting that he study Jin Ping Mei, a Ming dynasty erotic masterpiece. Arthur Waley, an established translator, agreed, so Hanan chose the subject as his doctoral dissertation. He chose Jin Ping Mei for his doctoral dissertation, and finally formed three series of papers which were published. One in the Asian Journal in 1962, "The text of the Chin Ping mei," explored the major editions of Jin Ping Mei, the similarities, differences and the relationship between versions. Hanan also made a detailed outline of the relationship between the original and the complement of the book by examining the meaning of the text.

The development of Chinese fiction in the 19th and early 20th centuries was one of his most important concerns. The 19th century has often been considered as a relatively stagnant period when compared to the efflorescence of the 17th and 18th centuries for Chinese fiction. The development of Chinese fiction in this period got much less attention from literary critics for its lack of innovation and creativity. However, in the monograph Chinese Fiction of the Nineteenth and Early Twentieth Centuries, Hanan proved this view misguided by presenting eleven detailed critical essays. He indicated that Chinese novelists came into much more frequent contact with western fictions and fictional methods in the 19th and early 20th centuries so that literary work was actually experiencing constant evolution. He was interested in examining writings in this period from an integrated approach of combining Chinese classical literary tradition as well as the western narratological techniques. He was also concerned how western missionaries in Chinese society adapted their religious writing to the taste of Chinese readers.

== Reactions to his work ==
A state-of-the-field article written by Robert Hegel, of Washington University in St. Louis in 1994 grouped Hanan with scholars who combine Eastern and Western critical approaches, both close reading of texts typical of Western schools and intense scrutiny of Chinese pingdian, or commentator/ editors. Hanan's first book-length monograph, The Chinese Short Story. Studies in Dating, Authorship, and Composition (1973) was a "pioneering effort to utilize stylistic analysis to group huaben stories of Yuan and Ming periods that exhibit similar characteristics." Hanan accommodated evidence from more conventional analysis, the reviewer continued, with the result that "his classification scheme is extremely useful in general despite the reservations some have concerning specific details." David Tod Roy, University of Chicago, wrote of Hanan's "amazing erudition and fecundity ... one of those rare scholars of whom it may be said that his work has permanently altered the landscape of the field." Robert Hegel reviewed Hanan's collection of essays, Chinese Fiction of the Nineteenth and Early Twentieth Centuries, in the sinologolical journal T'oung Pao, and said "Any scholarly writing by Patrick Hanan ... is to be welcomed; regardless of topic, it is sure to be worth our careful consideration. This essay collection marks yet another direction taken in his four-decade long career of distinguished publications, and it is as important as his previous writings.

Hanan identified Chinese novels for translation that would promote understanding of Chinese society. His translation of Li Yu's The Carnal Prayer Mat (1990), a reviewer wrote, "has caught the author's sardonic tone, the tongue-in-cheek apology for outlandish ideas and practices, and the uproarious or deadpan humor of both speeches and narration." In his A Tower for the Summer Heat (1998), he translated six out of twelve stories from Li Yu's Shi'er lou. This translation is known as "highly accurate and very nice stylistically--a truly masterful combination." His last translation published before his death was Mirage (2016), an anonymous novel about the lives of Guangdong merchants who traded with the West. Posthumously in 2017, his translation of Luo Guanzhong's The Three Sui Quash the Demons' Revolt was published under the title Quelling the Demons' Revolt.

== Major publications ==
- "The Development of Fiction and Drama", in Raymond Dawson, (ed.), The Legacy of China (Oxford: Oxford University Press, 1964). pp. 115–143.
- The Chinese Short Story: Studies in Dating, Authorship, and Composition. (Cambridge, Massachusetts: Harvard University Press, Harvard-Yenching Institute Monograph Series, 1973). ISBN 0674125258.
- The Chinese Vernacular Story. (Cambridge, Massachusetts: Harvard University Press, Harvard East Asian Series, 1981). ISBN 0674125657.
- The Invention of Li Yu. (Cambridge: Harvard University Press, 1988). ISBN 0674464257. Joseph Levenson Book Prize 1990.
- tr. Lin Fu and Jianren Wu. The Sea of Regret: Two Turn-of-the-Century Chinese Romantic Novels. (Honolulu: University of Hawai'i Press, 1995). ISBN 0824816668.
- "The Missionary Novels of Nineteenth-Century China", Harvard Journal of Asiatic Studies 60.2 (2000): 413–443.
- ed., Treasures of the Yenching: Seventy-Fifth Anniversary of the Harvard-Yenching Library. (Cambridge, Massachusetts; Hong Kong: Harvard-Yenching Library; Distributed by the Chinese University Press, Harvard-Yenching Library Studies No. 1, 2003). ISBN 9629961024 Google.
- with Judith T. Zeitlin, Lydia He Liu and Ellen Widmer. Writing and Materiality in China: Essays in Honor of Patrick Hanan. (Cambridge, Massachusetts: Published by Harvard University Asia Center for Harvard-Yenching Institute: distributed by Harvard University Press, Harvard-Yenching Institute Monograph Series; 58, 2003). ISBN 0674010981.
- Chinese Fiction of the Nineteenth and Early Twentieth Centuries: Essays. (New York: Columbia University Press, Masters of Chinese Studies, 2004). ISBN 0231133243. Google Books
- Falling in Love: Stories from Ming China. (Honolulu: University of Hawai'i Press, 2006). ISBN 0824829956.

Annotated bibliography

1. Hanan, Patrick. 1973. The Chinese Short Story: Studies in Dating, Authorship, and Composition. Vol. 21;21.;. Cambridge, Mass: Harvard University Press. The Chinese Short Story: Studies in Dating, Authorship, and Composition, is the first monograph of Patrick Hanan, which focuses on the context of literary scholarship and critical approach in the Chinese fiction, which is different from the former attempt of critical study.

2. Hanan, Patrick. 1981. The Chinese vernacular story. Vol. 94. Cambridge, Mass: Harvard University Press. The Chinese Vernacular Story is Hanan's second monograph, that includes both methodology study and theme-oriented case studies. Chapter one introduces the language and style, narrative model and analysis of the Chinese vernacular stories. Chapter two and three discusses the division of Chinese vernacular tales from the early period to the middle period. The following six chapters are specific case study with detailed analysis of the writing of novelist during the late Ming and Qing era, such as Feng Menglong, Langxian, Ling Mengchu, Li Yu, and Aina.

3. Hanan, Patrick, and ACLS Humanities E-Book. 1988. The Invention of Li Yu. Cambridge, Mass: Harvard University Press. Hanan's third published monograph is The Invention of Li Yu, that invents Li Yu through restoring the writing, life and world of Li Yu, from his drama to fiction, from his habits to personality, from his friends to concubines.

4. Fu, Lin, Jianren Wu, and Patrick Hanan. 1995. The Sea of Regret: Two Turn-Of-The-Century Chinese Romantic Novels. Honolulu: University of Hawaiʻi Press. His fourth published writing, The Sea of Regret: Two Turn-of-the-Century Chinese Romantic Novels, is the collection of the translation of two romantic novels––Stone in the Sea (Qin hai shi), written by Fu Lin, and The Sea of Regret (Hen hai), written by Wu Jianren. The later novel is written as the response to the former one. Both of these two novels could be traced to the origin of a tragic ancient Chinese myth, that the daughter of the Fiery Emperor takes the rebirth as a bird after drowns in the Eastern Sea.

5. Hanan, Patrick, Judith T. Zeitlin, Lydia He Liu, and Ellen Widmer. 2003. Writing and Materiality in China: Essays in Honor of Patrick Hanan. Vol. 58;58.;. Cambridge, Mass: Published by Harvard University Asia Center for Harvard-Yenching Institute. Writing and Materiality in China: Essays in Honor of Patrick Hanan, is not only his fifth monograph, but also be noticed as his first published paper writing in the new century. This is a collection of writing done by Dr. Hanan and his friends, colleagues and disciples. The entire collection is arranged chronologically under numerous but systematic themes, inducing rubbings, writing on walls, actors, late Ming print culture, the emergence and rise of the sense of feeling and individuality in the late Ming, the origin of urban courtesan in the late Qing, and the official popular culture in the twentieth-century China. Readers should be impressed by its wide selection of topics, the span of time, and definitely the honor of both authors and editors/coeditors, such as Judith T. Zeitlin, Lydia H. Liu, Wu Hong, Shang Wei and Sophie Volpp.

6. Hanan, Patrick. 2004. Chinese Fiction of The Nineteenth And Early Twentieth Centuries: Essays. Vol. 2.;2;. New York: Columbia University Press. The sixth monograph written by Patrick Hanan is Chinese Fiction of the Nineteenth and Early Twentieth Centuries, that is written with independent pieces, but with a systematic content, which is the Chinese fictions written from the nineteenth to the early twentieth centuries, especially the sense of association between the Chinese and Western literary traditions.

7. Hanan, Patrick. 2006. Falling in Love: Stories From Ming China. Honolulu: University of Hawai'i Press. Falling in Love: Stories from Ming China, should be Hanan's most recent published book. This is the collection of translation of seven outstanding late Ming vernacular stories––"Shengxian", "The Oil Seller" "Marriage Destinies Rearranged", "The Rainbow Slippers", "Wu Yan", "The Reckless Scholar", and "The Lovers’ Tomb". All of these seven stories are from two Ming vernacular-story collection––Xing shi hengyan and Shi dian tou. All seven stories are chosen under a certain theme¬¬––"falling in love" or the cult of enchantment and individual feeling. Also, Hanan discusses the technique of simulated context of late Ming story-writers in addressing their readers and rise a sense of sympathy.
