= Asian Journal =

Asian Journal may refer to

- Asian Journal of Communication
- Asian Journal of Distance Education
- Asian Journal of International Law
- Asian Journal of Mathematics
- Asian Journal of Pentecostal Studies
- Asian Journal of Public Affairs
- Asian Journal of Pharmaceutics
- Asian Journal of Social Psychology
- Asian Journal of Transfusion Science
- The Journal of Asian Studies
- Asian Journal (newspaper), a Filipino-American newspaper
