= Huang Chuping (politician) =

Chinese politician

- 黄楚平

Chairman of the Standing Committee of the Guangdong Provincial People's Congress
- Incumbent
- Assumed office January 2022
- Preceded by: Li Yumei

Chairman of the Hubei Provincial Committee of the Chinese People's Political Consultative Conference
- In office January 2021 – December 2021
- Preceded by: Xu Liquan
- Succeeded by: Sun Wei

Personal details
- Born: October 1962 (age 63–64) Huanggang, Hubei, China
- Party: Chinese Communist Party
- Education: Wuhan University of Science and Technology; University of Science and Technology Beijing; Zhongnan University of Economics and Law

Chinese name
- Simplified Chinese: 黄楚平
- Traditional Chinese: 黃楚平
Transcriptions
Standard Mandarin
- Hanyu Pinyin: Huáng Chǔpíng

Huang Chuping (Chinese: 黄楚平; born October 1962) is a Chinese politician and the current party branch secretary of Guangdong Provincial People's Congress. Previously he served as chairman of the Hubei Provincial Committee of the Chinese People's Political Consultative Conference and before that, executive vice governor of Hubei. He is a delegate to the 13th National People's Congress.

== Early life and education ==
Huang was born in Huanggang, Hubei, in October 1962. In 1980, he was accepted to Wuhan Institute of Iron and Steel (now Wuhan University of Science and Technology), majoring in metal materials and heat treatment. After graduation, he worked at the institute.

== Career in Hubei ==
In May 1997, he became deputy secretary of Wuhan Municipal Committee of the Communist Youth League, rising to secretary in October 1997. He served as governor of Jianghan District from August 2002 to November 2004, and party secretary, the top political position in the district, from August 2004 to December 2006. He was appointed secretary-general of CCP Wuhan Municipal Committee in December 2006 and was admitted to member of the standing committee of the CCP Wuhan Municipal Committee, the city's top authority. In March 2007, he was named acting mayor of Xianning, replacing Li Bing. He was installed as mayor in August. In March 2008, he was promoted to be party secretary, concurrently serving as chairman of its People's Congress since June of that same year. In June 2012, he was promoted to member of the standing committee of the CCP Hubei Provincial Committee, the province's top authority. He was party secretary of Yichang in July 2012, and held that office until December 2016. In December 2012, he was promoted to become executive vice governor, a position he held until January 2021, when he was appointed chairman of the Hubei Provincial Committee of the Chinese People's Political Consultative Conference, the province's top political advisory body.

== Career in Guangdong ==
In December 2021, he was assigned to south China's Guangdong province and appointed party branch secretary of Guangdong Provincial People's Congress.

Government offices
Preceded by Li Bing	Mayor of Xianning; 2007–2008	Succeeded by Ren Zhenhe
Preceded by Wang Xiaodong	Executive Vice Governor of Hubei; 2016–2021	Succeeded by Li Lecheng
Party political offices
Preceded by Xu Kezhen	Communist Party Secretary of Xianning; 2008–2012	Succeeded by Ren Zhenhe
Preceded by Guo Youming	Communist Party Secretary of Yichang; 2012–2016	Succeeded by Zhou Ji
Assembly seats
Preceded by Xu Kezhen	Chairman of Xianning People's Congress; 2008–2012	Succeeded by Zhou Ji
Preceded by Guo Youming	Chairman of Yichang People's Congress; 2012–2016	Succeeded by Zhou Ji
Preceded by Xu Liquan	Chairman of the Hubei Provincial Committee of the Chinese People's Political Consultative Conference; 2021	Succeeded by Sun Wei
Preceded by Li Yumei	Chairman of Guangdong Provincial People's Congress; 2022–present	Incumbent
