= Roscoea cangshanensis =

Scientific classification
- Kingdom: Plantae
- Clade: Tracheophytes
- Clade: Angiosperms
- Clade: Monocots
- Clade: Commelinids
- Order: Zingiberales
- Family: Zingiberaceae
- Genus: Roscoea
- Species: R. cangshanensis

Binomial name
- Roscoea cangshanensis M.H.Luo, X.F.Gao & H.H.Lin

Species of flowering plant

Roscoea cangshanensis was described in 2007 as a perennial herbaceous plant native to the mountains of China, being found in Yunnan. Most members of the ginger family (Zingiberaceae), to which it belongs, are tropical, but R. cangshanensis, like other species of Roscoea, grows in much colder mountainous regions. As of August 2024, Plants of the World Online does not recognize this species, including it within R. forrestii.

== Description ==
Roscoea cangshanensis is a perennial herbaceous plant. Like all members of the genus Roscoea, it dies back each year to a short vertical rhizome, to which are attached the tuberous roots. When growth begins again, "pseudostems" are produced: structures which resemble stems but are actually formed from the tightly wrapped bases (sheaths) of its leaves. Plants of R. cangshanensis are usually 22–30 cm tall, with three or sometimes four leaves. The hairless (glabrous) leaf blade is usually 7–24 cm long by 1.5–2.5 cm wide, but may be as short as 2 cm. It narrows at the base, becoming almost like a stalk (petiole). There is a small ligule, about 1.5 mm long, at the junction of the blade and sheath.

In its native habitats, R. cangshanensis flowers between July and August. The stem (peduncle) of the flower spike is hidden by the leaf sheaths. The yellowish-green bracts which subtend the flowers are very short, only 5–15 mm long. Each spike has two or three flowers, which are reddish purple to pale purple.

Each flower has the typical structure for Roscoea (see the diagrams in that article). There is a tube-shaped outer calyx, 5.5–7 cm long with a two-toothed apex, which is pale green to white. Next the three petals (the corolla) form a long tube, 10–12.5 cm in length, terminating in three lobes, a narrow upright central lobe, 1.5–2.5 cm long by 8–12 mm wide, and two somewhat narrower side lobes, 1.5–2.5 cm long by 3–4 mm wide. Inside the petals are structures formed from four sterile stamens (staminodes): two lateral staminodes form what appear to be small upright petals, about 1.2 cm long by 7 mm wide; two central staminodes are fused at the base to form a lip or labellum, 2.5–3.5 cm long by 2.5–3 cm wide. The labellum bends backwards and is deeply split into two lobes, each divided again. The base of the labellum is marked with narrow white lines.

The single functional stamen has a white anther, about 6 mm long, with approximately 3 mm long spurs formed from the connective tissue between the two capsules of the anther. The ovary is about 1.2 cm long.

== Taxonomy ==
Roscoea cangshanensis was first described scientifically in 2007 in a paper by four Chinese scientists, of whom three are given as the authors of the binomial name: Luo Ming-Hua, Gao Xin-Fen and Lin Hong-Hui. The specific epithet refers to the Cangshan mountain range where it was found. As of August 2024, Plants of the World Online does not recognize this species, including it within Roscoea forrestii.

== Evolution and phylogeny ==
The family Zingiberaceae is mainly tropical in distribution. The unusual mountainous distribution of Roscoea may have evolved relatively recently and be a response to the uplift taking place in the region in the last 50 million years or so due to the collision of the Indian and Asian tectonic plates.

Species of Roscoea divide into two clear groups, a Himalayan clade and a "Chinese" clade (which includes some species from outside China). The two clades correspond to a geographical separation, their main distributions being divided by the Brahmaputra River as it flows south at the end of the Himalayan mountain chain. It has been suggested that the genus may have originated in this area and then spread westwards along the Himalayas and eastwards into the mountains of China and its southern neighbours.

R. cangshanensis was not described until after the phylogenetic analysis by Ngamriabsakul et al. It occurs in the geographical region of the Chinese clade. The original describers considered that it appeared to be related to both R. forrestii and R. debilis.

== Distribution and habitat ==
Roscoea cangshanensis has been found only in one location, in the Cang Shan mountains in Yunnan, China, where it occurs at 2,600 metres in damp soil under pines.
