= Guangdong Provincial People's Congress =

Guangdong Provincial People's Congress 广东省人民代表大会
- 14th Guangdong Provincial People's Congress

Type
- Type: Province-level people's congress

Leadership
- Chairman of the Standing Committee: Huang Chuping, CCP since January 2022
- Vice Chairpersons of the Standing Committee: Huang Ningsheng, Ye Zhenqin, Zhang Shuofu, Xiao Yafei, Liu Yahong, Tan Ling, CCP
- Secretary-General of the Standing Committee: Xu Hong, CCP

Elections
- Guangdong Provincial People's Congress voting system: Plurality-at-large voting & Two-round system

Guangdong Provincial People's Congress
- Simplified Chinese: 广东省人民代表大会
- Traditional Chinese: 廣東省人民代表大會
Transcriptions
Standard Mandarin
- Hanyu Pinyin: Guǎngdōng Shěng Rénmín Dàibiǎo Dàhuì

The Guangdong Provincial People's Congress is the people's congress of Guangdong, a province of China. The Congress is elected for a term of five years. The Guangdong Provincial People's Congress meetings are held at least once a year. After a proposal by more than one-fifth of the deputies, a meeting of the people's congress at the corresponding level may be convened temporarily.

== Organization ==
=== Chairpersons of the Standing Committee ===
Name	Took office	Left office	Ref.
Li Jianzhen	December 1979	July 1985	
Luo Tian	July 1985	May 1990	
Lin Ruo	May 1990	February 1996	
Zhu Senlin	February 1996	February 2001	
Zhang Guoying	February 2001	January 2003	
Lu Zhonghe	January 2003	January 2005	
Huang Liman	January 2005	January 2008	
Ou Guangyuan	January 2008	January 2013	
Huang Longyun	January 2013	January 2017	
Li Yumei	January 2017	January 2022	
Huang Chuping	January 2022	Incumbent	

== See also ==
- System of people's congress
