= Chinese Fiction of the Nineteenth and Early Twentieth Centuries =

Chinese Fiction of the Nineteenth and Early Twentieth Centuries is a 2004 book by Patrick Hanan, published by Columbia University Press. There are eleven essays total about the subject. They were created on separate dates, and are unrelated. The book examines how trends in Chinese literature and in non-Chinese literature influenced the subject matter. The collection includes examinations of the concept of a narrator in the subject matter, including examinations of the narrator characters.

== Reception ==
Géraldine Schneider of Harvard University wrote that the work "presents a significant contribution to scholarship not only on late imperial Chinese literature but also in the field of descriptive translation studies."

== See also ==
- The Chinese Novel at the Turn of the Century
- Fin-de-Siècle Splendor
