= Sun Wei (politician, born 1961) =

Chinese politician

- 孙伟
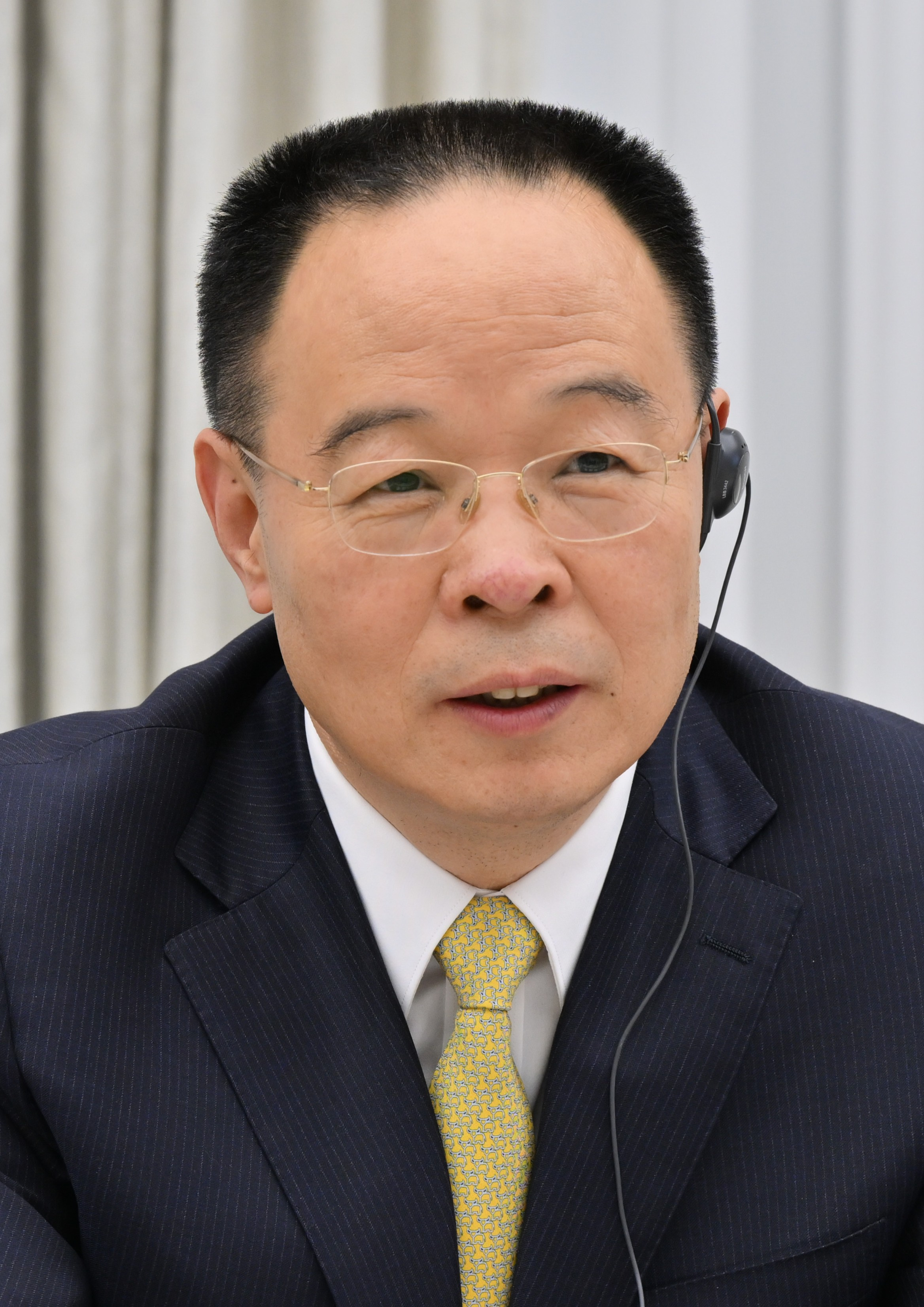
- Sun in 2025

Chairman of the Hubei Provincial Committee of the Chinese People's Political Consultative Conference
- Incumbent
- Assumed office 2022
- Preceded by: Huang Chuping

Personal details
- Born: December 1961 (age 64) Penglai County, Shandong, China
- Party: Chinese Communist Party
- Education: Peking University

Chinese name
- Simplified Chinese: 孙伟
- Traditional Chinese: 孫偉
Transcriptions
Standard Mandarin
- Hanyu Pinyin: Sūn Wěi

Sun Wei (Chinese: 孙伟; born December 1961) is a Chinese politician who is the current party branch secretary of the Hubei Provincial Committee of the Chinese People's Political Consultative Conference. Previously he served as deputy party secretary of Gansu, and before that, executive vice governor of Shandong. He was a delegate to the 11th and 12th National People's Congress. He was a representative of the 18th National Congress of the Chinese Communist Party and is a representative of the 19th National Congress of the Chinese Communist Party.

== Biography ==
Sun was born in Penglai County (now Penglai District of Yantai), Shandong, in December 1961. During the Cultural Revolution, he was a sent-down youth in Jinhua County, Zhejiang. In 1979, he was admitted to Peking University, where he majored in the Department of Geography.

After graduating in 1983, he was assigned to the Ministry of Urban-Rural Development and Environmental Protection as an official, and served until 1987. In May 1987, he became a secretary of the General Office of the State Council. He had been Wu Bangguo's secretary for a long time. He joined the Chinese Communist Party (CCP) in February 1988. He was deputy secretary-general of the Standing Committee of the National People's Congress in October 2004, and held that office until March 2011.

In February 2011, he was appointed executive vice governor of Shandong and was admitted to member of the standing committee of the CCP Shandong Provincial Committee, the province's top authority

In March 2017, he was appointed deputy party secretary of Gansu, concurrently serving as president of the province's party school.

In December 2021, he was appointed party branch secretary of the Hubei Provincial Committee of the Chinese People's Political Consultative Conference, the province's top political advisory body.

Government offices
Preceded by Wang Renyuan	Executive Vice Governor of Shandong; 2012–2017	Succeeded by Li Qun
Party political offices
Preceded by Ouyang Jian	Deputy Communist Party Secretary of Gansu; 2017–2021	Succeeded by Wang Jiayi
Assembly seats
Preceded by Huang Chuping	Chairman of the Hubei Provincial Committee of the Chinese People's Political Consultative Conference; 2022–present	Incumbent
