= Hubei Provincial Committee of the Chinese People's Political Consultative Conference =

Hubei Provincial Committee of the Chinese People's Political Consultative Conference 中国人民政治协商会议湖北省委员会
- 13th
- Emblem of the Chinese People's Political Consultative Conference

Type
- Type: United front organ Constitutional convention (Historical); Legislature (Historical) of Chinese People's Political Consultative Conference

History
- Founded: February 21, 1955; 71 years ago
- Preceded by: Hubei Provincial People's Congress Consultative Committee

Leadership
- Chairperson: Sun Wei

Website
- www.hbzx.gov.cn

Chinese name
- Simplified Chinese: 中国人民政治协商会议湖北省委员会
- Traditional Chinese: 中國人民政治協商會議湖北省委員會
Transcriptions
Standard Mandarin
- Hanyu Pinyin: Zhōngguó Rénmín Zhèngzhì Xiéshāng Huìyì Húběishěng Wěiyuánhuì

Abbreviation
- Simplified Chinese: 湖北省政协
- Traditional Chinese: 湖北省政協
- Literal meaning: CPPCC Hubei Provincial Committee
Transcriptions
Standard Mandarin
- Hanyu Pinyin: Húběishěng Zhèngxié

The Hubei Provincial Committee of the Chinese People's Political Consultative Conference (Chinese: 中国人民政治协商会议湖北省委员会; abbreviation CPPCC Hubei Provincial Committee) is the provincial advisory body and a local organization of the Chinese People's Political Consultative Conference in Hubei, China. It is supervised and directed by the Hubei Provincial Committee of the Chinese Communist Party.

== History ==
The Hubei Provincial Committee of the Chinese People's Political Consultative Conference traces its origins to the Hubei Provincial People's Congress Consultative Committee (湖北省各界人民代表会议协商委员会), founded in 1949.

== Term ==
=== 1st ===
- Term: February 1955–June 1959
- Chairperson: Wang Renzhong
- Vice Chairpersons: Hu Jinkui, Zhou Cangbai, Cui Guohan, He Yaobang, Li Xiping, Tu Yun'an, Li Buqing, Geng Bozhao, Zhou Jie, Li Guowei, Tao Shuzeng, Cai Shubin
- Secretary-General: Xie Wei

=== 2nd ===
- Term: September 1959–September 1964
- Chairperson: Wang Renzhong
- Vice Chairpersons: Hu Jinkui, Cai Shubin, Zhou Cangbai, Tao Shuzeng, He Yaobang, Li Xiping, Tang Zhe, Zhou Jie, Yao Kefang
- Secretary-General: Xie Wei

=== 3rd ===
- Term: September 1964–January 1978
- Chairperson: Wang Renzhong
- Vice Chairpersons: Hu Jinkui, Xu Juefei, Zhou Cangbai, He Yaobang, Tang Zhe, Zhou Jie, Yao Kefang, Liu Jisun, Yu Yi'an, Xie Fusheng, Jiang Bingling, Sun Yaohua, Xu Jinbiao
- Secretary-General: Xie Wei

=== 4th ===
- Term: January 1978–April 1983
- Chairperson: Zhao Xinchu (January 1978–February 1979) → Han Ningfu (February 1979–January 1980) → Xu Daoqi (January 1980–April 1983)
- Vice Chairpersons: Han Ningfu, Yan Jun, Hu Jinkui, Tang Zhe, Tao Shuzeng, Sun Yaohua, Yu Yi'an, Huang Hongru, Wu Xianwen, Wang Zhizhuo, Hua Yuqing, Zhang Wencai, Gao Shangyin, Chen Yixin, Xu Ziwei, Xie Fusheng, He Dinghua, Li Minghao, Bu Shengfu, Zhang Ruping, Zhou Jifang, Rao Qinzhi, Xu Jinbiao, Feng Xiuji, Xie Wei, Xie Yujin, Liang Zhiyan, Zhu Dingqing, Zhou Fangxian, Liu Jisun, Xu Juefei
- Secretary-General: Zhang Yanming

=== 5th ===
- Term: April 1983–May 1988
- Chairperson: Li Wei
- Vice Chairpersons: Shi Zirong, Xie Wei, Xiao Zuolin, Zhang Wencai, Zhou Jifang, Hua Yuqing, Rao Qinzhi, Xu Jinbiao, Xie Yujin, Liang Zhiyan, Tao Yang, Sun Yaohua, Cao Hongxun, Yang Rui, Zhou Yongzeng, Mu Changsheng, Hu Hengshan, Dong Yusen, Mao Gengsu, Tang Zhensheng, Han Wenqing
- Secretary-General: Zeng Chonglang

=== 6th ===
- Term: May 1988–May 1993
- Chairperson: Shen Yinluo
- Vice Chairpersons: Mu Changsheng, Hu Hengshan, Zhang Wencai, Dong Yusen, Lin Shaonan, Han Wenqing, Xie Zhi, Wu Yuqin, Jian Tiancong, Zhou Zibo, Shi Quan, Ping Linbo, Zeng Chonglang, Yuan Zhaochen, Wang Qigang
- Secretary-General: Wang Zhengqiang (April 1990–)

=== 7th ===
- Term: May 1993–January 1998
- Chairperson: Hui Liangyu (–February 1995) → Qian Yunlu (February 1995–)
- Vice Chairpersons: Zhang Huainian, Yuan Zhaochen, Jian Tiancong, Wang Qigang, Zhou Zibo, Meng Meilu, Shi Quan, Ping Linbo, Shen Kechang, Liu Jiankang, Cui Jianrui, Zhong Shuqiao, Dai Jianneng
- Secretary-General: Wang Zhengqiang

=== 8th ===
- Term: January 1998–December 2002
- Chairperson: Qian Yunlu (–December 1998) → Yang Yongliang (February 1999–)
- Vice Chairpersons: Ding Fengying, Wang Zhongnong, Han Nanpeng, Meng Meilu, Cheng Yuntie, Yang Binqing, Tao Xingshi, Cai Shuming, Xiao Guxin, Zheng Chuguang, Zhang Rongguo
- Secretary-General: Jin Qifang

=== 9th ===
- Term: January 2003–January 2008
- Chairperson: Wang Shengtie
- Vice Chairpersons: Ding Fengying, Wang Shaojie, Cai Shuming, Zheng Chuguang, Zhang Rongguo, Weng Xingde, Hu Yongji, Zhou Yikai, Chen Chunlin, Wu Qinghai, Song Defu
- Secretary-General: Wang Shuhua

=== 10th ===
- Term: January 2008–January 2013
- Chairperson: Song Yuying (–February 2011) → Yang Song (February 2011–)
- Vice Chairpersons: Li Youcai, Zheng Chuguang (–January 2012), Zhou Yikai, Chen Chunlin (–February 2011), Duan Lunyi, Li Zongbo, Chou Xiaole, Wu Xiufeng, Zheng Xin sui, Chen Baichuai (January 2009–), Tu Yong (February 2011–)
- Secretary-General: Wang Shuhua

=== 11th ===
- Term: January 2013–January 2018
- Chairperson: Yang Song (–January 2016) → Zhang Chang'er (January 2016–)
- Vice Chairpersons: Fan Xingyuan (–January 2016), Zheng Xin sui (–January 2016), Wang Zhenyou (January 2014–), Chen Tianhui, Liu Shanqiao, Xiao Xuming, Lu Zhongmei (–September 2015), Zhang Baiqing, Guo Yuejin, Tian Yuke
- Secretary-General: Liu Anmin (–January 2016), Zhai Tianshan (January 2016–)

=== 12th ===
- Term: January 2018–January 2023
- Chairperson: Xu Liquan (–January 2021) → Huang Chuping (January 2021–January 2022) → Sun Wei (January 2022–)
- Vice Chairpersons: Li Bing, Zhang Baiqing, Guo Yuejin, Ma Xuming, Peng Jun, Zhang Weiguo, Yang Yuhua, Qin Shunquan, Wang Hongling, Zhou Xianwang (January 2021–), Erkinjan Turaxun (January 2022–)
- Secretary-General: Zhai Tianshan (&ndashJanuary 2022) → He Guangzhong (January 2022&ndash)

=== 13th ===
- Term: January 2023–2028
- Chairperson: Sun Wei
- Vice Chairpersons: Erkinjan Turaxun, Zhang Baiqing, Ma Xuming, Peng Jun, Zhang Weiguo, Yang Yuhua, Qin Shunquan, Wang Hongling, Wang Xingyu
- Secretary-General: Tu Yuanchao
