= Li Yumei =

Chinese politician (born 1956)

- 李玉妹

Chairwoman of the Standing Committee of the Guangdong Provincial People's Congress
- In office January 2017 – January 2022
- Preceded by: Huang Longyun
- Succeeded by: Huang Chuping

Personal details
- Born: October 1956 (age 69–70) Yinan County, Shandong, China
- Party: Chinese Communist Party
- Education: Central Party School of the Chinese Communist Party

Li Yumei (Chinese: 李玉妹; pinyin: Lǐ Yùméi; born October 1956) is a Chinese politician who served as chairwoman of the Standing Committee of the Guangdong Provincial People's Congress from 2017 to 2022.

Li was an alternate of the 17th and 18th Central Committee of the Chinese Communist Party. Li is a representative of the 19th National Congress of the Chinese Communist Party. Li was a delegate to the 12th National People's Congress and is a delegate to the 13th National People's Congress.

== Biography ==
Li was born in Yinan County, Shandong, in October 1956. She entered the workforce in December 1974, and joined the Chinese Communist Party (CCP) in April 1976. During the late Cultural Revolution, she was a sent-down youth in her home-county.

In 1991, she was promoted to become party secretary of Pingyi County, a position he held until 1995. In 1997, she was promoted to acting mayor of Linyi, confirmed in 1998. She was appointed party secretary of Laiwu in 2001, concurrently serving as chairwoman of its People's Congress. In 2006, she was elevated to vice governor of Shandong, but having held the position for only one year. She became a member of the Standing Committee of the CCP Shandong Provincial Committee in 2007 before being assigned to the similar position in southeast China's Guangdong province in 2010. In January 2017, she rose to become chairwoman of the Standing Committee of the Guangdong Provincial People's Congress, succeeding Huang Longyun.

On 28 February 2022, she was transferred to Beijing and appointed vice chairperson of the National People's Congress Overseas Chinese Affairs Committee.

Government offices
Preceded by Qiao Yanchun	Mayor of Linyi; 1997–2001	Succeeded by Li Qun
Party political offices
Preceded by Shi Lijun	Communist Party Secretary of Laiwu; 2001–2006	Succeeded by Yu Jiancheng
Preceded by Liu Wei	Head of the Organization Department of the Shandong Provincial Committee of the Chinese Communist Party; 2007–2010	Succeeded by Gao Xiaobing
Preceded by Hu Zejun	Head of the Organization Department of the Guangdong Provincial Committee of the Chinese Communist Party; 2010–2017	Succeeded by Zou Ming
Party political offices
Preceded by Shi Lijun	Chairwoman of the Standing Committee of the Laiwu Municipal People's Congress; 2001–2006	Succeeded by Yu Jiancheng
Preceded by Huang Longyun	Chairwoman of the Standing Committee of the Guangdong Provincial People's Congress; 2017–2022	Succeeded by Huang Chuping
