= Li Jianzhen =

Chinese politician (b. 1907, d. 1992)

- 李坚真
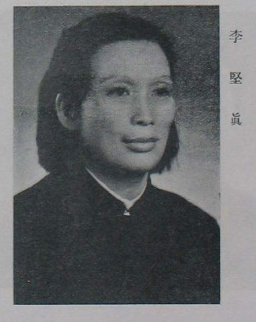
- Born: January 1907; Fengshun County, Guangdong
- Died: 30 March 1992 (aged 85); Guangzhou, Guangdong, People's Republic of China
- Other names: Li Xianzhen (李见珍); Li Jianzhen (李坚贞)
- Spouse: Deng Zhenxun (邓振询) (m. 1935; died 1943)
- Children: 2 (both adopted)
- Military career
- Allegiance: Chinese Communist Party
- Branch: Peasant Self-Defence Forces; Chinese Red Army; New Fourth Army; People's Liberation Army
- Conflicts: Northern Expedition; Chinese Civil War; Second Sino-Japanese War
- Central institution membership: 1954–1992: Member, National People's Congress; 1982-1992: Member, Central Advisory Commission

Li Jianzhen
- Traditional Chinese: 李堅真
- Simplified Chinese: 李坚真
Transcriptions
Standard Mandarin
- Hanyu Pinyin: Lǐ Jiānzhēn
- Wade–Giles: Li Chien-chen
Hakka
- Romanization: Li^{3} Gian^{1}-zen^{1}

Li Jianzhen (Chinese: 李坚真; January 1907 – 30 March, 1992) was a Chinese revolutionary, politician and songwriter.

== Early life ==
Li Jianzhen was born in Fengshun County to an impoverished Hakka family. Her father, Li Mu (李目) was a tenant farmer and stonemason, while her mother Wang Hao (王好) was a woodcutter and seamstress. When she was eight months old she was sold by her parents as a tongyangxi for eight strings of cash. Her foster-father Zhu Yaohong (Chinese: 朱耀宏) gave her the name Xianzhen (simplified Chinese: 见珍; traditional Chinese: 見珍; pinyin: Xiànzhēn).

She attended school for two years from the age of 10; after she turned 12, she had to do agricultural work with her foster-mother. From the age of 14 or 15 she became the household's main worker.

In May 1926, Peng Pai visited Li's home; he encouraged her to organise village women into the peasants' association which had not previously been active in the village. Soon after, she was elected deputy chair of the village peasants' association working group.

== Early revolutionary activities ==
In July 1926, Li joined the Peasant Self-Defence Forces in support of the Northern Expedition and made efforts to recruit other young women. In September 1926, she joined the Communist Youth League of China. In November 1926, she became organisational secretary of the Standing Unit of the Peasant Self-Defence Forces for the 4th District of Fengshun County.

Li joined the Chinese Communist Party (CCP) in June 1927 during the early stages of rural resistance to the White Terror, and in December that year participated in a Fengshun County peasant uprising coordinated with the Guangzhou Uprising. She became vice chair of the Fengshun County Revolutionary Committee in October 1928. (Note: Sometimes reported as 1927) As a member of the Chinese Red Army, she was active in western Fujian, part of the Jiangxi-Fujian Soviet; in November 1931, she became CCP committee secretary for Changting, the first female leader of a county-level CCP organization. In October 1933, she joined the Standing Committee of the CCP's Fujian Provincial Committee. She changed her name to Jianzhen (simplified Chinese: 坚贞; traditional Chinese: 堅貞; pinyin: Jiānzhēn) at this time.

== After the Long March ==
She joined the Long March in October 1934 and was one of 29 women to survive, arriving in Yan'an in October 1935. In late 1935, she married Deng Zhenxun, a fellow Hakka and revolutionary from Xingguo, Jiangxi. Deng had a son from his previous marriage, Deng Donglin (邓东林), who Li treated as her own child and continued to raise after her husband's death.

In late 1937, she and Deng Zhenxun were among a group of ten sent to Nanchang to strengthen the CCP's party-building work and New Fourth Army re-organization. In early 1938, they were among a group of five sent to Longyan, Fujian to assist Deng Zihui, Zhang Dingcheng and Tan Zhenlin in establishing the 2nd Detachment of the New Fourth Army. In February 1940, Deng became secretary of the Jiangsu-Anhui regional CCP committee and Li became head of the regional CCP school in Lishui County, southern Jiangsu.

In 1940, one of Li's colleagues in the CCP women's bureau suggested re-spelling her name as the homophonous 坚真 (堅真; Jiānzhēn) for an article in the New Fourth Army newspaper Resistance News ahead of International Women's Day. She continued to use this spelling for the rest of her life.

Li adopted her bodyguard Chao Yuxiang (巢玉祥) as her son in addition to Deng Donglin. Chao once saved the lives of both Li and her husband.

On 3 August 1943, her husband Deng Zhenxun died crossing the Qinhuai River in Jiangning County, under pursuit by Nationalist government forces.

From October 1943 to January 1944, Li served as CCP committee secretary for Lishui before moving to Guangde in southern Anhui where she became secretary of the newly-established CCP committee from March to July 1944.

In 1948, Li served as secretary of the CCP's Eastern China women's committee; she subsequently served as secretary of Shandong provincial women's committee and provincial women's federation.

In March 1949, she attended the inaugural conference of the All-China Women's Federation. In September 1949 she attended the first plenary session of the Chinese People's Political Consultative Conference.

== After 1949 ==
Following the 1949 proclamation of the People's Republic of China, Li returned to her home province and became chair of the Guangdong Women's Federation as well as deputy director and deputy chair of the Central-Southern Regional Women's Federation. She was a delegate to seven consecutive National People's Congresses, from the first in 1954 until her death in 1992, and served as chair of the Guangdong Provincial People's Congress Standing Committee from 1979 to 1983.

She was a delegate to the 8th, 11th, 12th and 13th National Congresses of the CCP and was an alternate member of the 8th and 11th CCP Central Committees. Li was vice chair of the Guangdong provincial revolutionary committee in 1973 and was one of the secretaries to the provincial CCP committee from 1977 to 1983 (Note: Before 1985, the top leader in the province was the First Secretary; Li never held this role). In September 1982 she was appointed to the Central Advisory Commission.

Li was famous for her frugal lifestyle: for 57 years she used the same woollen blanket that had been a wedding gift to her and Deng Zhenxun, and for 30 years she used the same wooden bench. Her son Deng Donglin studied at Southern University (later South China Normal University) in Guangzhou during the early 1950s; unlike the children of some officials he would always take the public bus, as Li said "for personal matters, official cars can't be used". Deng later became a grassroots cadre working in Jieyang, Conghua, Huiyang and Fengshun for many years. He never revealed his family background to others until 1973 when Li made a surprise visit with other high-level leaders who realised the connection. Her other son, Chao Yuxiang, never gained any high position.

In April 1989, she published "Li Jianzhen's 300 Hill Songs", a collection of Hakka hill songs together with her recollections of the Long March. In 1991 she published "Memoirs of Li Jianzhen".

She died on 30 March 1992 in Guangzhou.

== Notes ==
Preceded by new office	People's Congress Chairman of Guangdong; 1979–1983	Succeeded by Luo Tian
