= Third Month Fair =

Festival in Southwest China

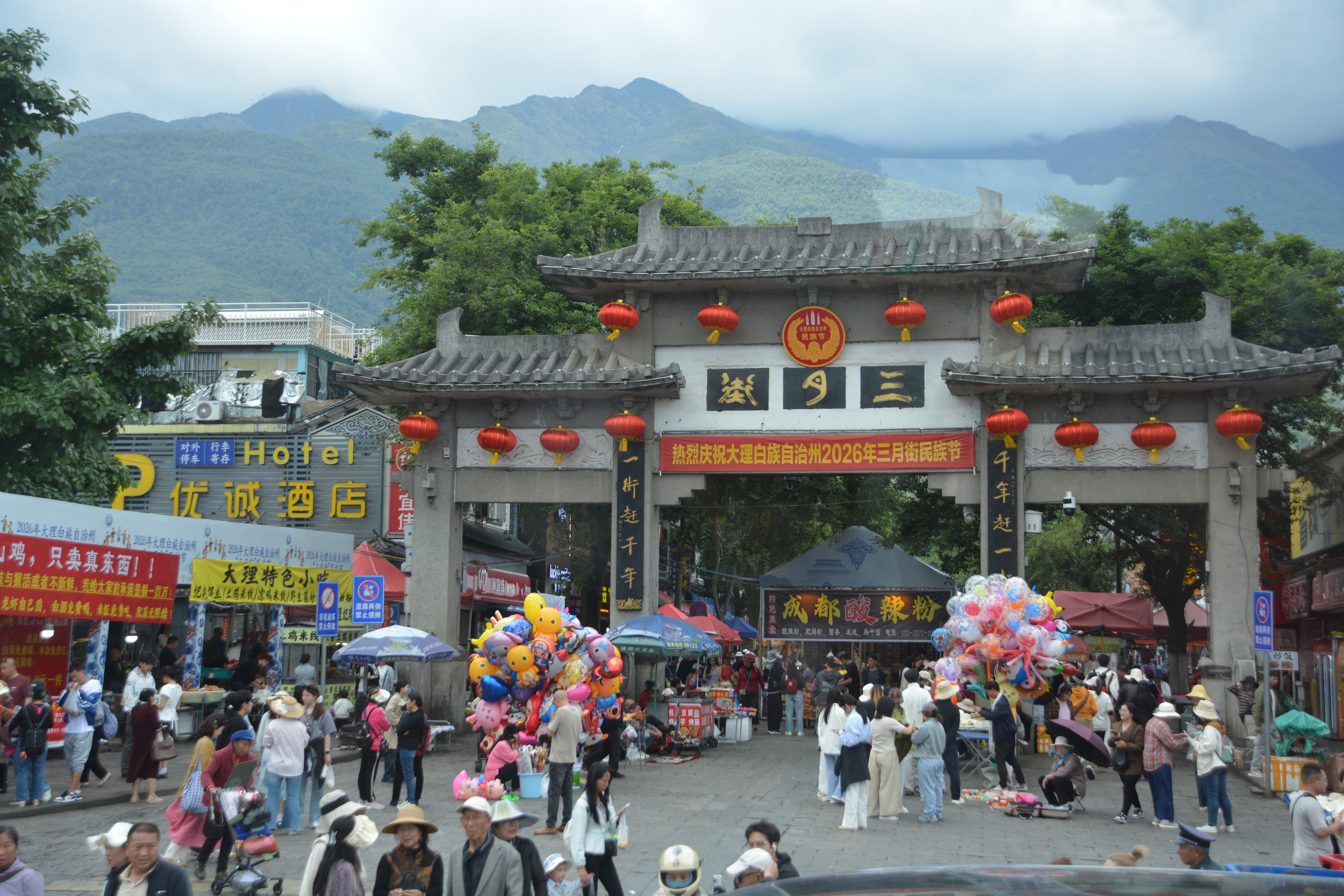
- The fair in Dali, 2026.
- Official name: 三月街 (Sānyuè Jiē)
- Observed by: Bai people and other ethnic groups of Yunnan
- Type: Traditional and official
- Celebrations: Street market, performances, sporting events
- Begins: 15th day of the third month of the Chinese calendar
- 2025 date: April 12
- 2026 date: May 1
- Frequency: Annual

The Third Month Fair (Bai language: salwa zix (Note: Also known in English as the Third Moon Fair, Third Month Market, Third Month Street Fair, March Fair, or other similar names. Chinese: 三月街; pinyin: Sānyuè Jiē; Bai: salwa zix.)) is one of the most important festivals celebrated by the Bai people of southwest China. It includes a street bazaar, performances, sports, and games, and takes place annually in Dali City, Yunnan. The fair lasts several days, starting on the 15th day of the third month of the Chinese calendar (in April or May of the Gregorian calendar). In 2025, it begins on April 12.

== Legendary origins ==
The festival is also known as the Market of Guanyin, Guanyin being the bodhisattva of mercy in Chinese Buddhism. It is said that Guanyin came to ancient Dali on the 15th day of the third month of the Chinese calendar, so an annual temple celebration was established on that day.

An alternative origin story says that the festival celebrates the marriage of a princess, from the family of the dragon king of Erhai Lake, and a fisherman. The princess and the fisherman went to an annual market, held by gods and goddesses on the 15th day of the third month, that had precious stones and medicinal herbs. A version of this story says that the market was on the Moon, and the couple went to buy fishing materials but did not find any. This celestial market (or a new market inspired by it) was moved to Earth, and it became the Third Month Street Fair.

== Observance ==
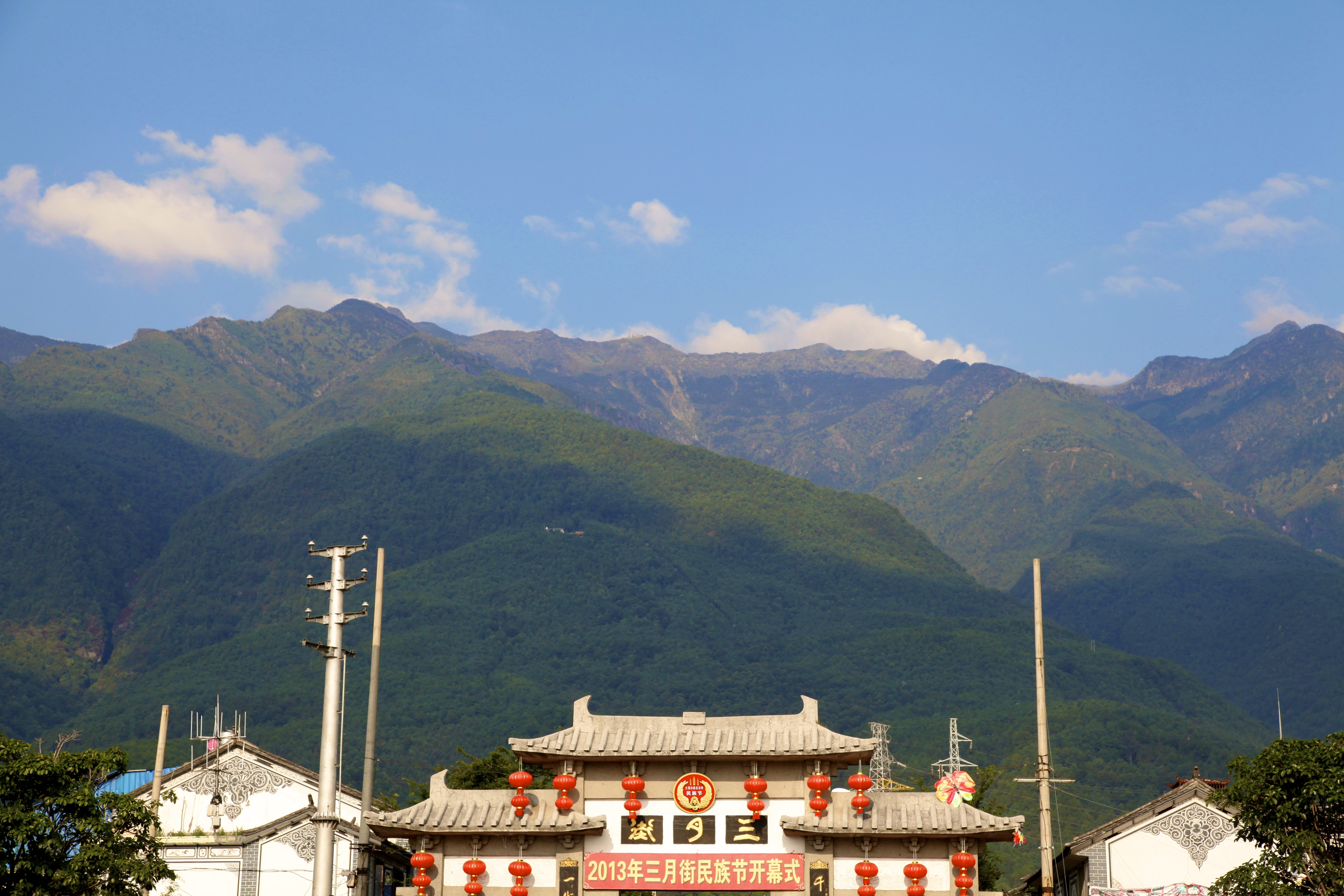
A building in Dali decorated for the Third Month Fair

The festival is observed by the Bai people and other ethnic groups of Yunnan. It begins on the 15th day of the third month of the Chinese calendar (in April or May of the Gregorian calendar), and lasts several days. (Note: The local public holiday lasts three days, but the festivities may last four, five, six, seven, or eleven days.)

The Third Month Fair dates back to the Tang dynasty and began as a Buddhist temple gathering (miaohui). It is traditionally a time to pray for the harvest. It is also associated with love, and is considered a time for courting.

It is celebrated with a street fair held below Mount Diancang, near Dali Old Town; the Dali area is the cultural center of the Bai people. Stalls at the fair sell a wide variety of goods, including medicinal herbs, handicrafts, Pu'er tea, traditional candy, local ham, livestock, silk, gemstones such as amber and jade, wooden sculptures, embroidery, hats, shoes, kitchenware, fishing and farming tools, and furniture. Animals sold at the market include cattle, horses, mules, and Inner Mongolian camels.

One of the fair's most well-known products is traditional medicine, and the Third Month Fair is said to have the most extensive array of medicinal products for sale anywhere in western Yunnan. A survey of the 2012 fair found hundreds of types of traditional medicine for sale, including some from other parts of China and from India, Myanmar, and Thailand. The most popular traditional medicines sold at the market include Magnolia biondii, Crataegus pinnatifida, and Glycyrrhiza uralensis.

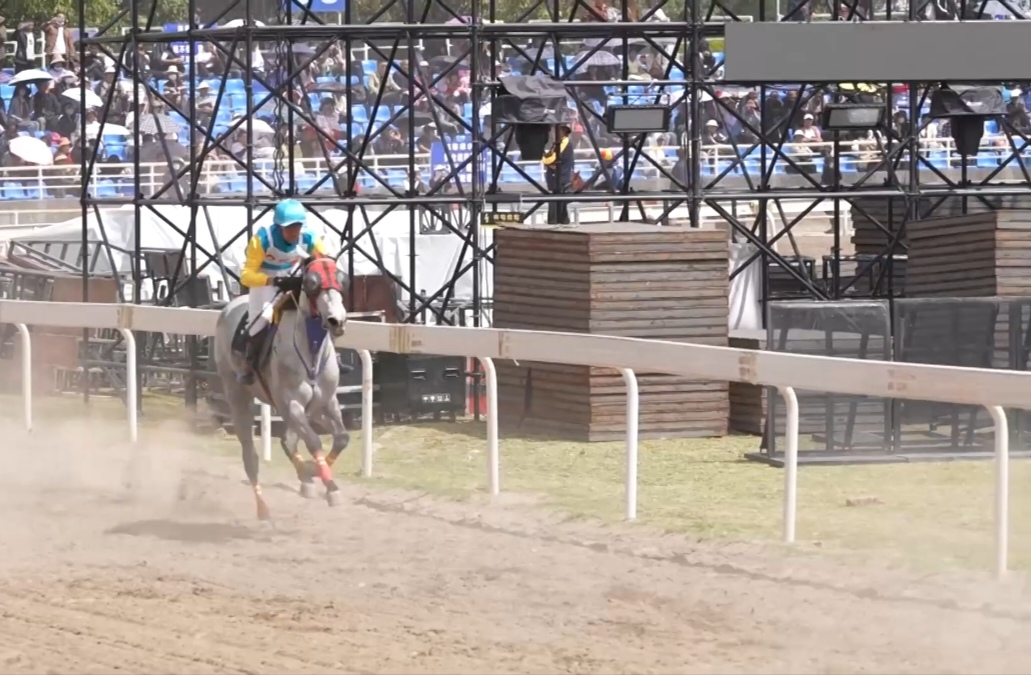
Horse racing during the Third Month Fair in 2024

The festival involves singing and dancing performances as well as competitions, including horse racing, dragon boat races, ball games, board games, archery, wrestling, and martial arts. People dress up in traditional festive attire, and the old town is extensively decorated, including with lanterns and flowers. The fair is famous throughout the country and has become a tourist attraction, attracting sightseers from other parts of China and abroad.

== Government recognition ==
In modern times, government officials have lent support to the Third Month Fair, seeing it as a way to promote economic growth, especially for minority communities, and to show support for Bai culture. The festival was formally recognized by the government of Dali Bai Autonomous Prefecture in 1991.

In the 1990s, the government invested in permanent structures for the market, including roads and hundreds of stalls. The project involved close to 4 million RMB from the local government and the Yunnan government and more than 13 million RMB from other investors.

In 2008, the Third Month Fair was recognized at the national level as part of China's intangible cultural heritage.

The Third Month Fair is a local public holiday in Dali Bai Autonomous Prefecture. It was made a public holiday in 1991, with residents getting two days off. This was later expanded to three days off, from the 15th to the 17th of the third month of the Chinese calendar.

In 2025, this corresponds to April 12 through 14.

== See also ==
- Chinese herbology
- Five Golden Flowers, a film that prominently features the Third Month Fair
- List of observances set by the Chinese calendar
- Tourism in China
- Traditional Tibetan medicine
