= Shenlou zhi =

Chinese erotic novel

- Cover of Mirage, translation of Shenlou zhi by Patrick Hanan
- Author: Anonymous
- Original title: 蜃樓志
- Translator: Patrick Hanan
- Language: Chinese
- Publication date: Early 19th-century
- Publication place: China (Qing dynasty)
- English publication date: 2014
- Media type: Print

Shenlou zhi
- Chinese: 蜃樓志
Transcriptions
Standard Mandarin
- Hanyu Pinyin: Shènlóu zhì

Shenlou zhi (蜃樓志) is a Chinese novel written in the Qing dynasty by an unknown author. Predominantly set in Ming dynasty Guangzhou, it follows the political career and love life of young polygamist Su Jishi (蘇吉士). First published in 1804, an unabridged English translation of the novel by Patrick Hanan was released in 2014 under the title Mirage.

== Plot ==
The novel takes place in the Ming dynasty. Guangzhou native Su Jishi (蘇吉士), also referred to by his childhood moniker Xiaoguan (笑官), is unwilling to follow in the footsteps of his father, a Cohong merchant, preferring to lead a hedonistic lifestyle instead. Su's father is continuously extorted by the corrupt tax officer He (赫), who has dozens of concubines alongside forty-odd prostitutes in his employ. Seizing upon the fact that He is unable to sexually satisfy his women, heterodox monk Mola (摩剌) kidnaps and impregnates them one by one. Meanwhile, Su has an affair with his future sister-in-law, who later leaves him for a more well-endowed lover. Su is introduced to fellatio by courtesan Ru (茹), and he subsequently has a threesome with her and prostitute Yerong (冶容). Throughout the novel, Su seeks to improve his sexual prowess; he finally becomes a "man of infinite capacity" after encountering a Tibetan monk who supplies him with some aphrodisiacs.

== Publication history ==
Comprising twenty-four chapters, Shenlou zhi was written in vernacular Chinese by an unknown author who used the pseudonym "Yuling Laoren" (庾嶺勞人) or "Heavy-Hearted Man of Yuling". According to the novel's preface, written by the "Layman of Mount Luofu" (羅浮居士), the author was born and raised in Guangdong. Shenlou zhi was first published in 1804 in Changshu, Jiangsu; a second print-run was recorded in 1857. A first-edition copy of the novel is housed at the National Library of China in Beijing. In 2014, the Chinese University Press published Mirage, an unabridged English translation of Shenlou zhi by Patrick Hanan. In the introduction to his translation, Hanan writes that Shenlou zhi is "the earliest novel by far" to describe the opium trade in China.

== Analysis ==
According to translator Patrick Hanan, the anonymous author of Shenlou zhi, which he classifies as a Bildungsroman, was inspired by Dream of the Red Chamber. Keith McMahon similarly describes the protagonist Su Jishi as a "reformed Ximen Qing" as well as a "benevolent polygamist". He further argues that the novel reuses many common tropes found in "previous vernacular fiction", for instance "the lone Tibetan monk with his potent aphrodisiacs and retractable penis" and "the corrupt and lecherous official and his sycophants".

== Critical reception ==
Shenlou zhi has received mixed reviews from literary critics. Nineteenth-century commentator Dai Bufan claimed that "no novel surpassed it" for a hundred years after its publication. Zheng Zhenduo, writing in 1927, praised the novel for its "realism and fluid style". Lin Chen likewise noted the realism in Shenlou zhi, but criticized its "imitativeness and idealization of polygamy". Cai Guoliang, in a 1985 treatise on Ming and Qing dynasty literature, found it one of the better "second or third rate" novels of the era but inferior to the likes of Dream of a Red Chamber and Rulin waishi.

Choice reviewer P. F. Williams praised the translation work on Mirage, calling it "superb", and the efforts taken to give notes and other information to explain allusions specific to the Chinese culture and language. Dylan Suher, in an article on Hanan for the magazine Asymptote, called Mirage "historically significant" and noted Hanan's particular style of translation that is "relentlessly attentive to the elegant touches that animated works of fiction like Mirage". While considering the original source material work to only be "OK" due to its heavy use of tropes and slow, almost episodic plot, Suher wrote that the work "has its charms". He especially liked the sensitive treatment of its protagonist and the subject of "tawdry commerce", preserving a part of people's lives that would not be covered in more official literature.

While discussing the translation's plot and allusions in an article for the Asian Review of Books, writer Jonathan Chatwin pointed out that the novel is "more than simply the sum of its allusions" and that it was able to combine the usage of tropes to form a "compelling portrait of a society on the cusp of a destabilising modernity" over its multi-chapter epic. It reflects the style of longer and more popular epics, including with its having hundreds of named characters, but Hanan's translation helps make the text more readable and a book that is to be "enjoyed" with its "clear, vernacular English". Keith McMahon reviewed the 2014 translated work of Mirage in the journal Nan Nü and heavily celebrated the "erudition and stamina" of Hanan completing the translation before his death. McMahon stated his doubts that the translation would be surpassed by another in "skill and accuracy" for "a long time" to come.
