= Du Yaxiong =

Chinese ethnomusicologist (1945–2024)

Du Yaxiong (Simplified Chinese: 杜亚雄; Traditional Chinese: 杜亞雄; 11 February 1945 – 7 October 2024) was a Chinese ethnomusicologist. He was best known for his work on ancient Chinese music theory and on Chinese minority folk music.

== Life and career ==
Du Yaxiong graduated from the Music Department of Northwest Normal University in 1965, received a Master of Arts degree from Nanjing University of the Arts in 1981, after which he joined the China Conservatory of Music, in Beijing as a professor of music and was the head of the Department of Musicology for thirteen years and is still professor and doctoral supervisor of the college.

In 1986, Du was awarded the title of "National Expert with Outstanding Contributions" (国家有突出贡献中青年专家) by the State Council for his outstanding achievements in teaching and scientific research. In 1987, at the invitation of the Hungarian Academy of Sciences, he was a visiting researcher at the Franz Liszt Academy of Music, studying the relationship between Chinese and Hungarian folk songs. In 1989, he published the book A Comparative Study of Chinese Folk Songs and Hungarian Folk Songs.

Du won a Fulbright Advanced Research Award and was invited to serve as a visiting professor at the Institute of Folklore at Indiana University from 1991 to 1992 where he also had the opportunity to study and collect Native American music. He twice won the Rockefeller Foundation's Bellagio Residency in 1996 and 2008 where he authored Traditional Chinese Music Theory (中国传统乐理教程) and Traditional Music Culture of Chinese Minorities (中国少数民族传统音乐文化). He completed a Ph.D. from the University of British Columbia in 2002.

Aside from conducting field work on traditional and folk music in over ten countries, Du Yaxiong has served as visiting professor at the Institute of Music of the Hungarian Academy of Sciences, the Victoria University of Wellington in New Zealand, the Institute of Folklore of Indiana University, and the School of Performing Arts of Youngstown University. The results of his research have been published in more than 20 monographs and over 200 articles published in English and Hungarian both in China and abroad.

== Selected works ==
- 1981 Yuguzu xibu minge yanjiu [A Study of Western Yugur Folk Songs]. Gansu minzu yanjiu [The Research of Ethnology of Gansu] 1:1-80. (in Chinese).
- 1982 Yuguzu xibu minge ji youguan minge zhi bijiao yanjiu [Comparative Research Between Western Yugur Folk Songs and Related Folk Songs of Other Nationalities]. Zhongguo Yinyue [Chinese Music] 4: 22–25. (in Chinese)
- 1984. Xiongnu xiqian jiqi minge zai Ouzhou de yingxiang [The Influence of Hun (Xiong-nu) Folk Songs in Europe During Their Westward Migration]. Zhongguo Yinyue [Chinese Music] 3: 7-9 (in Chinese)
- 1985. Comparative Research of Chinese Folk Songs and Hungarian Folk Songs. Ősi Gyökér. (bilingual English and Hungarian)
- 1990 Lun wudu jiegou [The Fifth Construction]. Zhongguo yinyue [Chinese Music] (3): 8–11. (in Chinese)
- 1990 Books and Tea. Fifth Annual Meeting of the Hungarian Historical Society of Zurich 1990. A Zürichi Magyar Történelmi Egyesület kiadványa Budapest – Zürich, 2005.
- 1993 Wusheng yinjiede fenlei jiqi jiegou [Classification of Pentatonic Scales and their Construction]. Zhongguo yinyue [Chinese Music] 4:11-13. (in Chinese)
- 1998 Rokon vonások a magyar és észak-kínai népzene között [Similarities between Hungarian and Northern Chinese Folk Music]. Főnix Könyvek 13. Transl. József Végvári. Edited by Zoltán Farkas. Debrecen: Dél-Nyírségi Bihari Tájvédelmi Kult. Értek. (in Hungarian)
- 2002 Historical Significance of Hungarian Folksong Research Conducted in the Twentieth Century. Eurasian Studies Yearbook 74: 97-111.
- 2004 Ritual Music in a North China Village: The Continuing Confucian and Buddhist Heritage. Chicago: Chinese Music Society of North America.
- 2014 Sichouzhilu de yinyue wenhua [Music of the Silk Road]. Suzhou: Suzhou University Press. (in Chinese)
