= Asian Journal of Social Psychology =

Journal

The Asian Journal of Social Psychology (AJSP) is a monthly psychology journal published by Wiley-Blackwell. The journal is published in conjunction with the Asian Association of Social Psychology and the Japanese Group Dynamics Association. AJSP publishes work in all aspects of social processes, including development, cognition, personality, health, counselling, organisation and education. According to the Journal Citation Reports, the journal has a 2020 impact factor of 1.424.
