= Luo Tian =

Chinese politician (b. 1920, d. 2001)

Luo Tian (1920-2001, Chinese: 罗天) was a Chinese politician. He was born in Dananshan town, Puning, Guangdong.

== Biography ==
In 1941, he was leader of the Chinese Communist Party in Jieyang County. He was made deputy People's Congress Chairman in 1979. He was a delegate to the 6th and 7th National People's Congress.

Preceded by Li Jianzhen	People's Congress Chairman of Guangdong; 1983-1990	Succeeded by Lin Ruo
