= Northwest Normal University =

University in Lanzhou, China

Coordinates: 36°06′N 103°44′E

- 西北师范大学
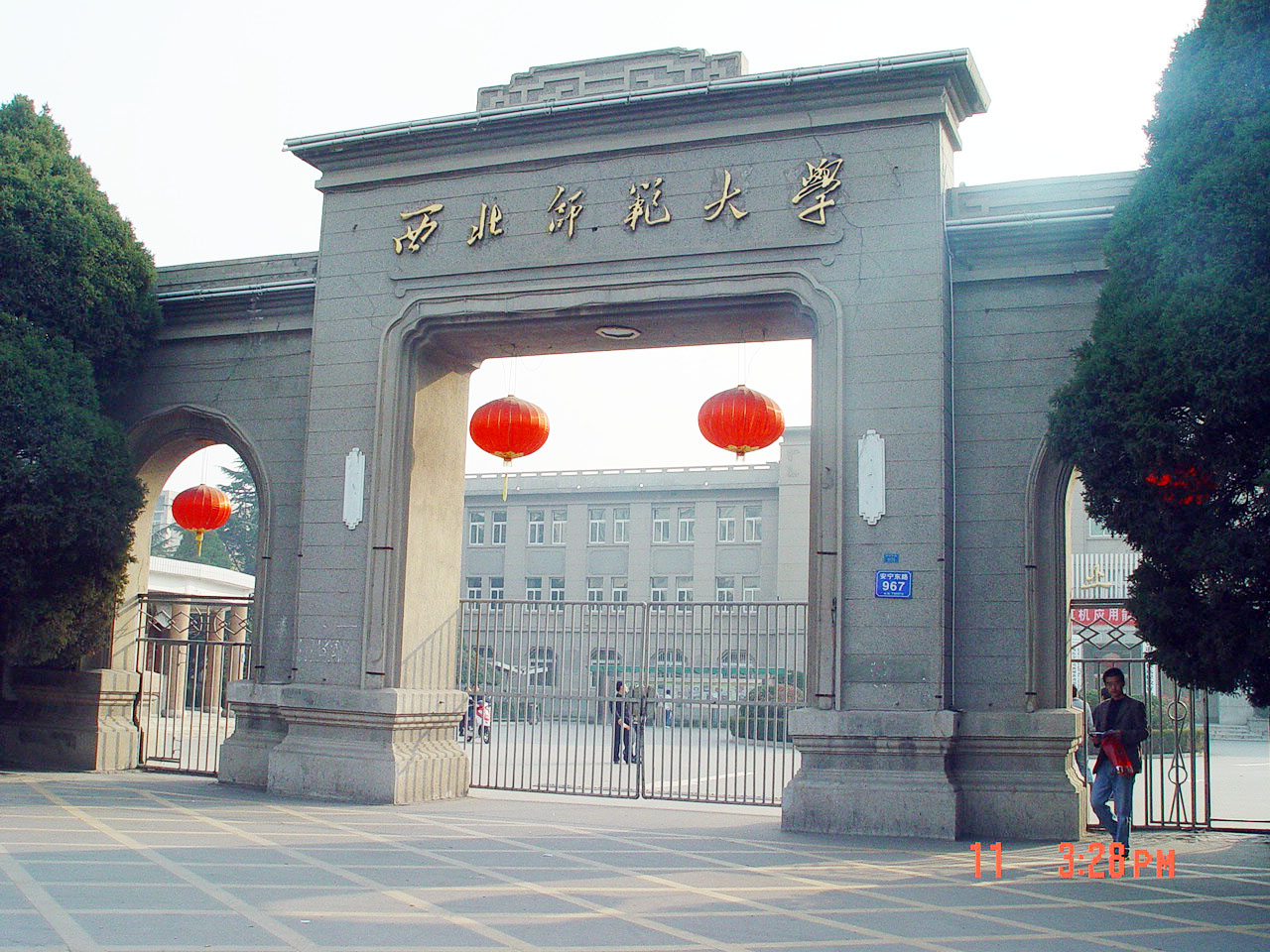
- Main door of NWNU
- Former names: Northwest Normal Institute (1981-1988); Gansu Normal University (1958-1981); National Northwest Normal Institute (1939-1958)
- Motto: 知术欲圆，行止须直
- Type: Public
- Location: 967 Anning E. Road, Lanzhou, Gansu, China
- Nickname: Xishida (西师大)，Xibei Shida (西北师大)
- Website: https://www.nwnu.edu.cn/

Northwest Normal University (Chinese: 西北师范大学; pinyin: Xīběi Shīfàn Dàxué) is a public university in Lanzhou, Gansu Province of the People's Republic of China. The university is authorized by the State Council of the Central Government of the People's Republic of China to grant associate degrees, bachelor's degrees, master's degrees, and doctoral degrees in more than 80 subject areas.

== History ==
Northwest Normal University (NWNU) is a key university under the joint construction of the People's Government of Gansu Province and the Ministry of Education of China. It is also one of the 14 state-supported universities in western China. The predecessor of NWNU is the National Beiping Normal University, which originates from the Normal School of the Metropolitan University founded in 1902. After the "July 7 Incident" of 1937, Beiping Normal University was incorporated into the National Beiping University and the Beiyang Engineering Institute. The new incorporation was named as the Northwest Union University, and the National Beiping Normal University reconstructed itself as an affiliated normal school and became independent in 1939 after being renamed as the National Northwest Normal Institute and moved to Lanzhou City In 1941. Before 1958, the National Northwest Normal Institute was one of the six key normal institutes directly under the administration of the Ministry of Education.

In 1958, the administration of the Institute shifted to Gansu Province. The Institute was renamed the Gansu Normal University, but resumed its name as Northwest Normal Institute in 1981. In 1988 the university was finally renamed Northwest Normal University.

== Research institutes and centers ==
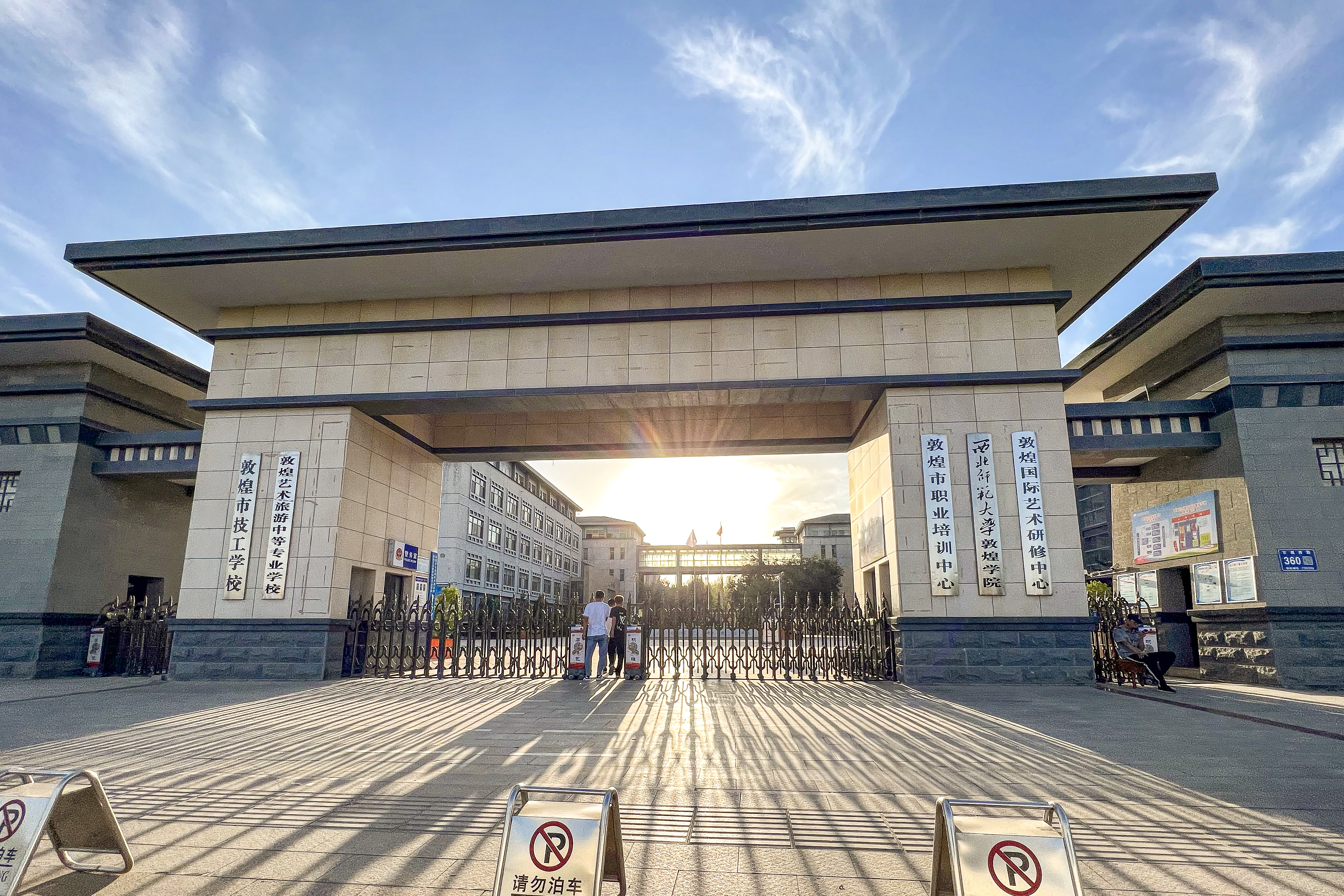
Dunhuang College of NWNU

In 1985, the Northwest Normal University set up the Northwest Ethnic Minority Teachers Training Center directly under the Ministry of Education, with the administrative system featuring "Two Plaques, One Leading Board". In 1987, Tibetan Teachers' Training Center under the State Council was established in the University. Under the commitment of the Ministry of Education, the University has established a good number of institutes and organizations such as the Elementary Education Curriculum Reform Research Center, the Northwest Ethnic Minority Education Development Research Center, the National Key Constructing Base of Training Teachers for Vocational Education, the National Base of Training Teachers for Physical Education, the Mentors' Training Base for the Ministry of Education, the Key Lab of Eco-Environmental Macromolecule Materials, and the NWNU Chinese Language and Culture Education Base.

Under the commitment of the Overseas Chinese Affairs Office of the State Council, and under the commitment of Gansu Province, 25 research institutes such as Gansu Cultural Development Institute and Gansu Educational Development Institute, as well as 4 provincial-level key labs were established. Up to now, NWNU has set up 26 colleges, 1 Independent Institute, 70 departments, 2 teaching departments, 160 teaching and research centers (institutes), and 41 labs (experimental centers).

== Facilities ==
The NWNU campus occupies a total area of 960 hectares. Its new campus covers 729 hectares.

The campus also includes 3600 hectares of green lands and construction compensation lands. All of the campus buildings cover a floor space of 820 thousand square meters, 395.8 thousand square meters of which are teaching buildings and auxiliary buildings.

The total value of the teaching facilities may be as high as 20,534 million yuan. The university library has a collection of more than 3.49 million volumes.

The University also established a modern network system for public education services, including a distance education network, a comprehensive teaching affairs management network, a campus computer network, a communication network and a cable TV network.

== Teaching ==
About 180,000 students have graduated from NWNU since its independence. The enrollment of the University has covered 31 provinces (cities and autonomous regions) and the number of the graduates is up to 35,200 now, among which 5600 are postgraduates and doctors, 16,900 undergraduates, and 12,700 adult students. NWNU has launched 5 undergraduate teaching reform programs consecutively.

== Faculty ==
NWNU has a teaching staff of 2,547, among which 1,303 are full-time teachers, 292 professors and 716 associate professors. Among the full-time teachers, 410 are doctors, 624 postgraduates, 3 academicians, 101 doctoral supervisors, 696 master students' supervisors, 1 "National Distinguished Teacher", 1 "Yangtze River Scholar", 2 national teaching teams and 1 innovation team under the Ministry of Education. The University has employed more than 380 experts and scholars as specially employed professors or part-time professors, among whom 10 are academicians from the Chinese Academy of Sciences and the Academy of Engineering. Prominent professors such as Lizheng, Li Jinxi, Yuan Dunli, Dong Shouyi, Li Jianxun, Hu Guoyu, Lv Sibai, Kong Xianwu, Chang Shuhong, Chenyong, Huangzhou, Pengduo, Guo Jinxi, Cheng Guodong, Xue Qunji, Li Bingde, Jin Baoxiang, Jin Shaoying, Nan Guonong have taught successively in the University.

== Areas of study and degrees granted ==
NWNU is among the first to be entitled the degree granting authority ratified by the State Council to confer bachelor's degree, Master's Degree and Doctorate since 1982. At present, the University has 6 postdoctoral research centers for Pedagogy, Chinese Language and Literature, Histology, Mathematics and Chemistry; 7 first-grade disciplines (Pedagogy, Chemistry, Chinese Language and Literature, Histology, Mathematics, Physics, Geography), 50 second-grade disciplines and 1 specialty with Doctorate granting authority; 32 first-grade disciplines, 157 second-grade disciplines and 11 specialties with master's degree granting authority; 2 national key disciplines, 1 innovation team under the Ministry of Education, 16 provincial-level key disciplines, 33 university-level key disciplines and 66 Bachelor's specialties such as English, Mathematics and Applied Mathematics, Art, Chinese Language and Literature, Geography, Physics, Histology, Chemistry and Bio-Science.

== International cooperation ==
The University has conducted international exchange and cooperation extensively, established cooperative relationships with more than 120 universities, set up research institutes and international organizations in more than 40 countries and China Taiwan province as well as Hong Kong Administrative Region, held more than 50 large-scale international academic conferences and educated more than 1,100 overseas students. Up to now, NWNU has established 2 Confucius Institutes with the University of Khartoum of Sudan and the Free International University of Moldova.

== Affiliates ==
NWNU affiliates include the Affiliated Educational Group, the Affiliated No. 1 Middle School, the Affiliated No.2 Middle School, the Affiliated Primary School and the Affiliated Kindergarten.

== Notable alumni ==
- Lydia H. Liu, comparative literature scholar at Columbia University, 1997 recipient of the Guggenheim Fellowship
- Du Yaxiong, ethnomusicologist known for his work on ancient Chinese music theory and Chinese minority folk music
- Li Xi, member of the 20th Politburo Standing Committee of the Chinese Communist Party
