= Asian Journal of Pharmaceutics =

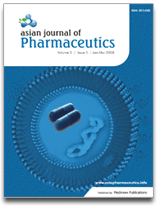
- Discipline: Pharmacology
- Language: English
- Edited by: V. B. Gupta

Publication details
- History: 2007–present
- Publisher: Medknow Publications
- Frequency: Quarterly
- Impact factor: 0.460 (2012)

Standard abbreviations
- ISO 4: Asian J. Pharm.

Indexing
- ISSN: 0973-8398 (print); 1998-409X (web)
- OCLC no.: 488358000

Links
- Journal homepage; Online access; Online archive

The Asian Journal of Pharmaceutics is a peer-reviewed open-access medical journal published by Medknow Publications on behalf of the B.R. Nahata Smriti Sansthan (Memorial Trust) (Mandsaur, India). Articles address topics in pharmaceutics, biopharmaceutics, pharmaceutical chemistry, pharmacognosy, pharmacology, pharmaceutical analysis, pharmacy practice, and clinical and hospital pharmacy.

== Abstracting and indexing ==
The journal is abstracted and indexed in the following databases:

- EBSCO databases
- Excerpta Medica/EMBASE
- Expanded Academic ASAP
- Health & Wellness Research Center
- Health Reference Center Academic
- Sociedad Iberoamericana de Información Cientifica databases

According to the Journal Citation Reports, the journal has a 2012 impact factor of 0.460.
