= Lydia H. Liu =

Chinese American academic

- Awards: Guggenheim Fellowship (1997)

Academic background
- Education: Northwest Normal University (BA); Shandong University (MA); Harvard University (PhD)

Academic work
- Discipline: Comparative literature
- Institutions: University of California, Berkeley; University of Michigan; Columbia University

Lydia H. Liu
- Simplified Chinese: 刘禾
- Traditional Chinese: 劉禾
Transcriptions
Standard Mandarin
- Hanyu Pinyin: Liú Hé

Lydia He Liu (Chinese: 刘禾) is a theorist of media and translation and a scholar of comparative literature. She is the Wun Tsun Tam Professor in the Humanities at Columbia University.

== Biography ==
Liu received a BA from Northwest Normal University in Lanzhou, China. She then received an MA from Shandong University and PhD from Harvard University.

She taught at University of California, Berkeley from 1990 to 2002 and was the William L. Magistretti Distinguished Professor of East Asian Languages and Cultures. She also taught at the University of Michigan from 2004 to 2006 and held the chair of the Helmut Stern Professorship in Chinese Studies and Professor of Comparative Literature before joining the Columbia faculty in 2006. Her scholarship has focused on modern China, cross-cultural cultural exchanges, and global transformation in modern history.

Liu established the Tsinghua-Columbia University Center for Translingual and Transcultural Studies at Tsinghua University in 2011.

Liu was a fellow of the National Humanities Center from 1997 to 1998. She was the recipient of a Guggenheim Fellowship in 1997.
