= Ashma =

Sani narrative poem

English translation, translated by Gladys Yang and published by Fredonia Books.

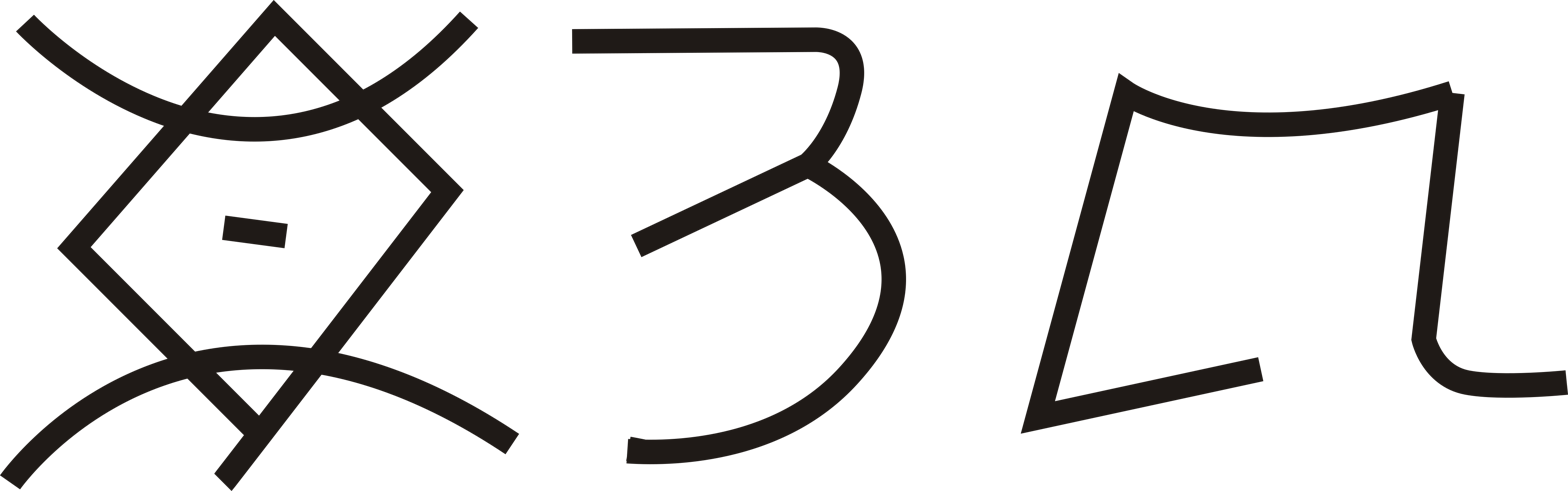
Ashma or Ashima (Sani: ; Nuosu: ꀊꏂꃀ; Chinese: 阿诗玛; pinyin: Āshīmǎ) is a long narrative poem of the Sani people, who are centred in southwest China, in the area of Kunming, Yunnan Province. During the 1950s, as the Chinese government undertook a classification process for its non-Han minority nationalities, the Sani applied for independent status, but they were turned down and are now classified as part of the Yi people.

Originally part of a long-standing Sani oral tradition, transmitted from generation to generation by recitation or song, Ashma was transcribed in 1813 from a Sani elder by ethnographer Wang Wei and published with other folk tales in a scroll entitled "Tales from the Mountains."

It tells the romantic story of a Sani girl named Ashma, whose name literally means more precious than gold." The poem itself is known among the Sani as "the song of our ethics" said to reflect the Sani national character in demonstrating that light will finally overcome darkness, and kindness and beauty will eventually triumph over infamy.

The poem uses a romantic poetic technique with rich figures of speech. It can be recited or sung, and it affords opportunities for various types of traditional singing, such as Xidiao ("happy tune"), Laoren Diao ("sad tune"), Kudiao ("crying tune"), and Madiao ("scolding tune"). There are no fixed occasions to sing. It can be performed on various occasions, such as at weddings, memorial ceremonies, sacrificial rites, or at work.

The story of Ashma has been translated into more than 20 languages, including English, French, German, Spanish, Russian, Japanese and Korean. In Japan, it has been adapted as a radio play, an opera, and a children's drama. In China, it has been produced as a film entitled "Ashma," the first color film of the People's Republic of China in 1964, a Peking opera, a Yunnan opera, a dance drama, and a Sani opera and performed all over the country.
