= Asian Journal of Pentecostal Studies =

Philippine academic journal

- Discipline: Theology, Intercultural Studies, History
- Language: English

Publication details
- History: 1998-present
- Publisher: Asia Pacific Theological Seminary (www.apts.edu)
- Frequency: Semi-Annual

Standard abbreviations
- ISO 4: Asian J. Pentecostal Stud.

Indexing
- ISSN: 0118-8534
- OCLC no.: 262698608

Links
- Journal homepage

The Asian Journal of Pentecostal Studies is an English-language peer-reviewed academic journal sponsored by the Asia Pacific Theological Seminary (APTS). It is one of the longest running journals of its kind in the Majority World. It is published in Baguio, the Philippines.

== Objectives ==
The journal has a stated objective "to encourage serious theological thinking and articulation by Pentecostals/Charismatics in Asia; to promote interaction among Asian Pentecostals/Charismatics and dialogue with other Christian traditions; to stimulate creative contextualization of the Christian faith; and to provide a means for Pentecostals/Charismatics to share their theological reflection."

== Editorial ==
The first issue was released January, 1998 and is published semi-annually. Its founding editors were Wonsuk Ma, (then) Academic Dean of the APTS and William W. Menzies, Chancellor of APTS. The current managing editor, Dr. Dave Johnson, assumed the position in June, 2012.

== Contributors ==
Contributions are largely, but not exclusively, from Pentecostal and Charismatic scholars and non-participating scholars on Asian topics.
