= Wang Jiayi =

Chinese politician

- 王嘉毅

Vice Minister of Education
- Incumbent
- Assumed office 21 December 2022
- Premier: Li Qiang
- Minister: Huai Jinpeng

Personal details
- Born: December 1965 (age 60) Qingtongxia, Ningxia, China
- Party: Chinese Communist Party
- Education: Northwest Normal University

Wang Jiayi (Chinese: 王嘉毅; pinyin: Wáng Jiāyì; born December 1965) is a Chinese university administrator and politician, currently serving as vice minister of education, in office since December 2022.

He is an alternate of the 20th Central Committee of the Chinese Communist Party.

== Early life and education ==
Wang was born in Qingtongxia, Ningxia, in December 1965. In 1984, he enrolled at Northwest Normal University, where he majored in psychology. He joined the Chinese Communist Party (CCP) in November 1985, during his sophomore year.

== Career ==
After university in 1991, he stayed for teaching. He was an instructor in 1991. He moved up the ranks to become assistant to the president in June 1999, vice president in July 2001, and president in April 2011.

He was appointed director of the Gansu Provincial Education Department in August 2012 and in May 2017 was admitted to member of the CCP Gansu Provincial Committee, the province's top authority. He was made secretary-general of the CCP Gansu Provincial Committee in June 2017, concurrently serving as director of the Reform Office, director of the Finance and Economics Office, and director of the National Security Office. In July 2020, he became head of the Publicity Department of the CCP Gansu Provincial Committee, succeeding Chen Qing. He rose to become specifically designated deputy party secretary of Gansu in March 2022.

In December 2022, he was transferred to Beijing and appointed vice minister of education. He also serves as chief educational inspector.

Educational offices
Preceded by Wang Limin	President of Northwest Normal University; 2011–2012	Succeeded by Liu Zhongkui
Government offices
Preceded by Bai Jizhong	Director of the Gansu Provincial Education Department; 2012–2017	Succeeded by Wang Haiyan
Party political offices
Preceded by Li Jianhua	Secretary-General of Gansu Provincial Committee of the Chinese Communist Party; 2017–2020	Succeeded by Shi Moujun
Preceded by Chen Qing	Head of the Publicity Department of Gansu Provincial Committee of the Chinese Communist Party; 2020–2022	Succeeded by Zhang Yongxia
Preceded by Sun Wei	Specifically-designated Deputy Communist Party Secretary of Gansu; 2022	Succeeded by Shi Moujun
