= Guo Youming =

Chinese politician

- 郭有明

Vice-Governor of Hubei
- In office August 2011 – January 2014
- Governor: Wang Guosheng

Communist Party Secretary of Yichang
- In office February 2008 – July 2012
- Preceded by: Li Youcai
- Succeeded by: Huang Chuping

Mayor of Yichang
- In office July 2003 – March 2008
- Preceded by: Li Youcai
- Succeeded by: Li Lecheng

Personal details
- Born: December 1956 (age 69) Suizhou, Hubei, China
- Party: Chinese Communist Party (1985–2014, expelled)
- Education: Wuhan University; University of Toronto

Guo Youming (Chinese: 郭有明; pinyin: Guō Yǒumíng; born December 1956) is a former Chinese politician from Hubei province. He served as the party secretary of Yichang in Hubei province between 2008 and 2011, and the vice-governor of Hubei from 2011 to 2014. In 2013, he was investigated for "serious disciplinary violations", a phrase usually denoting corruption, and subsequently expelled from the Chinese Communist Party (CCP).

== Biography ==
Guo was born in Suizhou, Hubei in December 1956.

Resumption of University Entrance Examination in 1977, Guo entered Wuhan University in February 1978, majoring in water conservancy engineering, where he graduated in January 1982. After graduation, he worked in Hubei as an officer.

Guo got involved in politics in January 1982 and he joined the CCP in May 1985.

In June 2000 he was promoted to become the party vice-secretary of Yichang, a position he held until February 2008. Guo served as the mayor of Yichang between July and March 2008. In February 2008, Guo was elevated to the party secretary of Yichang.

In November 2011, Guo studied at University of Toronto.

In August 2011, Guo was promoted to become the Vice-Governor of Hubei.

== Downfall ==
In November 2013, Guo was being investigated by the Central Commission for Discipline Inspection for "serious violations of laws and regulations". On 9 January 2014, Guo was dismissed from his position for corruption.

On 21 April 2014, Guo was expelled from the CCP; his case was handed to the Nanyang Intermediate People's Court in Henan province, where he was charged with bribery. The court found Guo guilty of taking more than 23.8 million yuan (US$3.70 million) in bribes, and sentenced him to 15 years in jail on 9 December 2015.

Government offices
Preceded by Li Youcai	Mayor of Yichang; 2003–2008	Succeeded by Li Lecheng
Party political offices
Preceded by Li Youcai	Communist Party Secretary of Yichang; 2008–2012	Succeeded by Huang Chuping
