= Cang Mountain =

Mountain range in Yunnan, China

Cang Mountain 苍山 / 蒼山
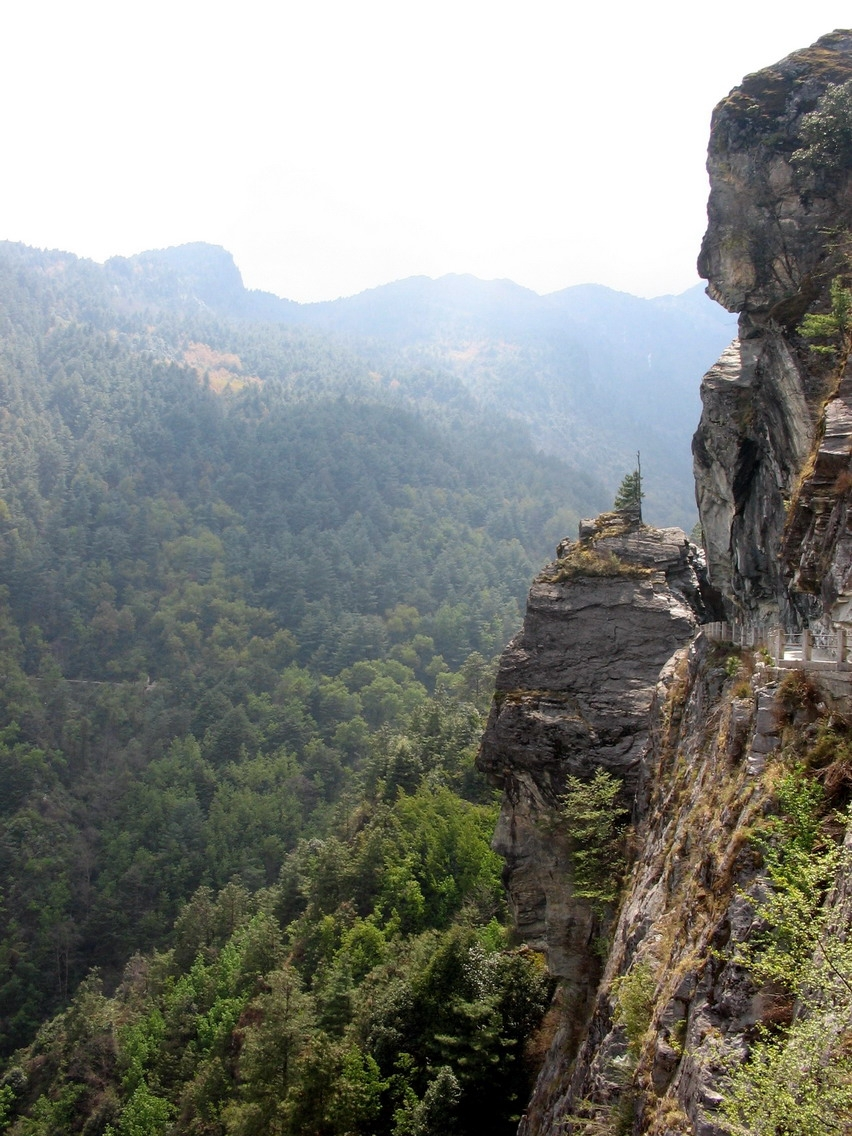
- Along the southern route of the Jade-Cloud Road

Highest point
- Peak: Malong
- Elevation: 4,122 m (13,524 ft)

Geography
- Location within China
- Country: China
- Province: Yunnan
- Range coordinates: 25°38′56″N 100°05′53″E

Cangshan or Cang Mountain (simplified Chinese: 苍山; traditional Chinese: 蒼山; pinyin: Cāngshān), also known as Mount Diancang (simplified Chinese: 点苍山; traditional Chinese: 點蒼山; pinyin: Diǎncāngshān), is a mountain range immediately west of Dali City in Yunnan province of Southwest China.

The highest summit, Malong, is 4,122 m, but the range includes another 18 peaks that are over 3,500 m elevation.

== History ==
The mountain range is noted for its rich, diverse flora, first scientifically documented by Jean Marie Delavay in 1882.

In 1991 construction began on a paved walkway running north and south from the top chairlift station near ancient Dali. This walkway passes several waterfalls and overlooks lake Erhai and the ancient city itself. This walkway is named "Jade-Cloud Road" after the cloud formations that appear over the Cang Mountain peaks. Construction was completed in 1992 and in 2004 a new project was launched to widen the road and increase its length.

At the Dali Town chairlift station on the mountainside is a temple complex as well as a small travellers' inn. A second chairlift was completed in 2012 which takes visitors to just below the summit of the Cang Mountain Range. Pathways from the summit chairlift station allow visitors to walk to the peak and also to visit the TV and radio relay station that is situated on top of the ridge.

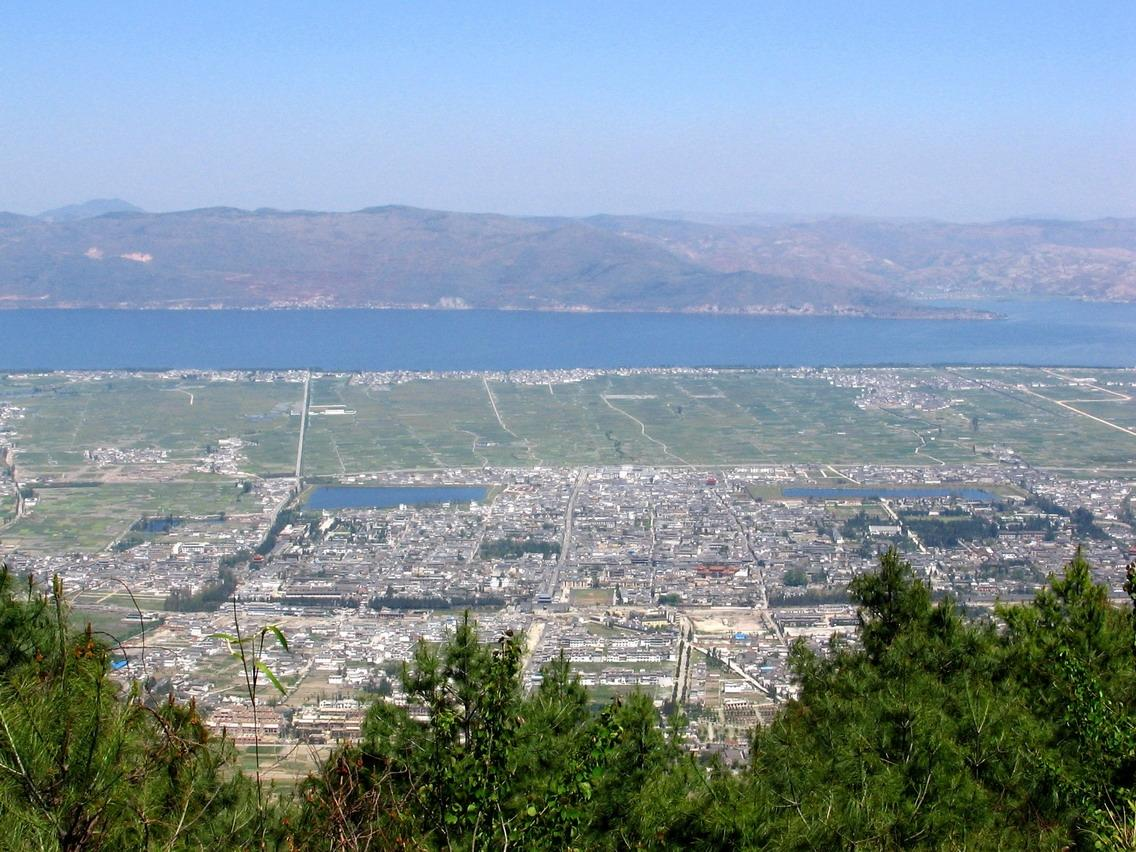
Ancient Dali as seen from Cang Mountain, near the chairlift station

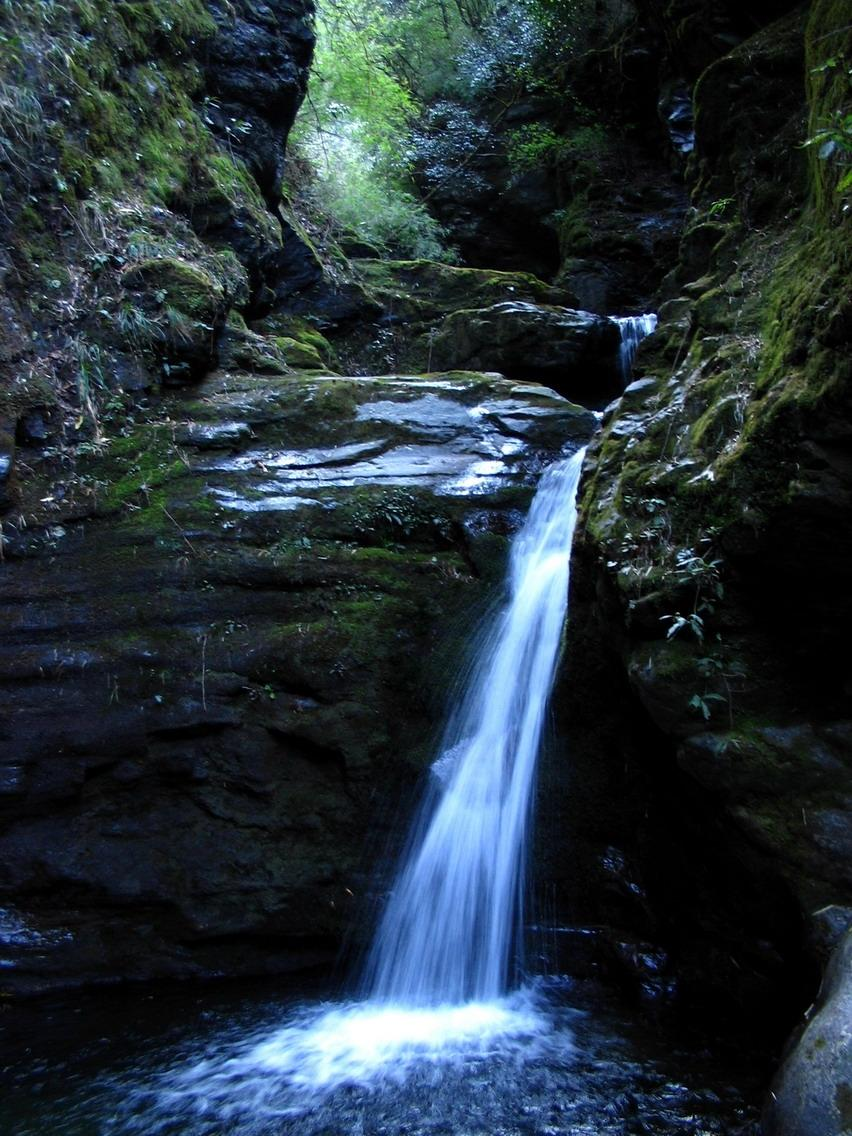
One of many waterfalls on the eastern slopes of the mountain

== In local culture ==
The foot of the mountain is the location of the annual Third Month Fair.
