= Sani people =

Ethnic group native to China

The Sani people (撒尼人) are a branch of the Yi people in China and speak the Sani language a dialect of the Yi language. The Sani people live mainly in the central part of Yunnan, notably Shílín (formerly Lùnán) and Yíliáng counties as well as in Lúxī County.
