= Fin-de-Siècle Splendor =

Book by David Der-Wei Wang (1997)

- Author: David Der-Wei Wang
- Genre: Non fiction
- Publisher: Stanford University Press
- Publication date: June 1997
- ISBN: 9780804728454

Fin-de-Siècle Splendor: Repressed Modernities of Late Qing Fiction, 1848-1911 is a 1997 non-fiction book by David Der-Wei Wang, published by Stanford University Press. David Wang's thesis is that modernity was already beginning to appear in fiction published in the late Qing Dynasty of China, defined by Wang as beginning in 1849, around the start of the Taiping Rebellion, rather than only appearing after the Qing Dynasty concluded in 1912. This is the first English-language full-length book written by a single author that surveyed late Qing Dynasty fiction.

Robert Hegel of Washington University in St. Louis stated that the book focuses on fiction "generally despised as backward, decadent, and certainly not modern" and that while it does not attempt to subvert the understanding of May Fourth Movement-era works itself, Wang argues that there were multiple new literary forms pursued in the post-Taiping era, not just intentionally Westernized writing. Therefore, according to Hegel, Fin-de-Siècle Splendor is "a revisionist study of the first order".

== Background ==
The title "Fin-de-Siècle Splendor" refers to a renewal of society as well as decadence and loss of previous values that Wang argued appeared in both Chinese and European literary societies of that time period.

At the time Wang worked at Columbia University as a professor of Chinese literature.

Wang defined the start of the "late Qing Dynasty" as beginning in 1849, around the Taiping Rebellion, while scholarly consensus as of the late 1990s considered 1890, characterized by the effects of the First Sino-Japanese War, as the beginning of the late Qing dynasty in terms of intellectual developments. Prior works produced in China and outside of China which discuss late Qing literature use 1900-1910 as their focus. Theodore Huters of the University of California, Los Angeles argued that by expanding the scope of the genre, Wang "greatly expands and enriches our notion of the world of Qing dynasty fiction."

== Contents ==
The book analyzed over sixty works, including around twenty novels. It covers four genres of late Qing fiction: chivalric and court case, courtesan (novels with erotic and sentimental themes), "novels of exposure", and "science fantasy". David Wang argued that until the time his book was published, these genres had not received sufficient attention from historians specializing in Chinese fiction nor from literary critics.

Most genres were already accepted ways of classifying Qing Dynasty fiction. Chivalric and court-case books are a combination of two genres: one about judges, or court-case works, and one about a heroic individual who seeks to right wrongs, or chivalric (侠义; xiáyì) works. Some categorizations of novels originated from Lu Xun. In Chinese, Lu Xun referred to the prostitution novels as 狭邪小说; xiáxié xiǎoshuō, and to the "novels of exposure," which document poor urban residents and their troubles and criticize society, as 谴责小说; qiǎnzé xiǎoshuō. Wang used Lu Xun's categorizations of novels but referred to them under different names.

The "science fantasy" classification is an original idea from Wang. The science fantasy (科学小说; kēxué xiǎoshuō) novels combined Chinese traditional storytelling with Western science fiction; the Chinese storytelling genre is called zhiguai (志怪) in Mandarin. Librarians and publishers usually call this genre, which usually includes late 20th century Chinese fiction, as "science fiction and fantasy."

In his principal chapters, 2 through 5, he introduces particular works, some of which are lesser-known and some of which are well-known and explains why he believes they are modern. Some of the content originated from his 1993 Chinese-language book Xiǎoshuō Zhōngguó: Wǎn Qīng dào dāngdài de Zhōngwén xiǎoshuō (小說中國：晚清到當代的中文小說 "China's Novels: Chinese-language Novels of the late Qing Dynasty through the present day") and other earlier works written by him.

Philip F. Williams of Arizona State University stated that some people reading the book may need to consult other scholarly reference guides in order to help them understand Fin-de-Siècle Splendor due to the absence of edition, publication, and serialization information of some works chronicled within the book.

Wang decided not to write about Henhai (meaning "Sea of Regret"), arguing that its quality was below that of the courtesan novels he chose to discuss; Williams stated that Wang had not made a category for books not neatly fit into the primary categories he chose to discuss, and Henhai does not neatly fit into those categories. Williams wrote that "and other scholars have analyzed Sea of Regret elsewhere with more patience and subtlety."

=== Introduction and chapters ===
The book's introduction is 12 pages long, and discusses Wang's explanation of the term "repressed modernities". The author argues why he believes late Qing Dynasty fiction is "modern" in the book's introduction, and he defines modernity as, in the words of Helena Heroldová of Archiv Orientální, "a phenomenon that is new and innovative" and that, in her words, he thought that modernity combined possibilities of new things. Wang stated that Qing works used new types of characters, ideologies, narrative formats, situations, and themes. Wang was opposed to the idea that modernity meant developing linearly into something more advanced.

"Repressed Modernities," Chapter 1, describes the historical conditions in the Qing Dynasty. Heroldová argued that it was an extension of the introduction. Williams wrote that even though it was intended to introduce what was in the primary chapters, it "actually reads more like a conclusion" to those four chapters. Williams stated that some of Wang's conclusions about late Qing fiction described in this chapter are "neo-Freudian".

"Edifying Depravity: The Courtesan Novel," the second chapter, discusses courtesan novels. Wang argues that concepts of women's liberation first appear in these books. This chapter discusses A Flower in a Sinful Sea (Niehai hua), The Nine-tailed Turtle (Jui wei gui), The Sing-song Girls of Shanghai, the 1859 novel Huayue hen (花月痕 "Traces of the flower and the moon") by Wei Zi'an (魏子安, also known as Wei Xiuren 魏秀仁), and the 1849 novel Pinhua biaojian (Chinese: 品花寶鑑 "Precious Mirror for Judging Flowers") by Chen Sen, as well as various fictional characters based on Sai Jinhua.

"Justice Undone, Chivalric and Court-case Fiction," Chapter 3 discusses chivalric and court case books, which Wang argues influenced later works made regarding China's revolutions. Of all of the chapters it chronicles the largest number of full-length novels. Works discussed include the 1820s to 1903 series Shi gong'an (施公案; "The court cases of Judge Shi"), the 1853 work Dangkou zhi (蕩寇志; "Quell the Bandits") by Jin Shengtan, the Ernü Yingxiong Zhuan, the 1879 version of The Three Heroes and Five Gallants (Sanxia wuyi), the 1892 novel Peng gong'an (彭公案; "The court cases of Judge Peng") and its sequels, the 1904 novel Nü yu hua (女獄花, "A Flower in a Woman's Prison") by Wang Miaoru, the 1906 novel Huo Diyu (活地獄; "Living Hell") by Li Boyuan, and The Travels of Lao Can.

"Abject Carnival: Grotesque Exposés," Chapter 4 discusses "novels of exposure," or "grotesque exposes." Wang argues that Hu Shih, Lu Xun, and other literary figures in the May Fourth Movement failed to appreciate the late Qing grotesque expose genre. Works discussed include The Travels of Lao Can, Bizarre Happenings Eyewitnessed over Two Decades (Ershinian mudu zhi guai xianzhuang), Officialdom Unmasked (Guanchang xianxing ji), The 1879 novel He dian (何典; "What Sort of Novel is This") by Zhang Nanzhuang (張南莊), the 1905 novel Modern Times (Wenming xiaoshi) by Li Boyuan, and the 1908 work Damabian or Damapian (大馬扁, or 大馬騙 meaning "Big Tricksters").

"Confused Horizons: Science Fantasy," Chapter 5, discusses science fantasy novels and how they helped usher in development in the science and technology field. Quell the Bandits is discussed again in the context of the science fantasy genre in the initial part of the chapter, making it the only novel discussed at length in two separate chapters. Other works discussed include Cat Country (Maocheng ji), the 1902 work Xin Zhongguo weilai ji "The future of new China") by Liang Qichao, the 1904 work Yueqiu zhimindi (月球殖民地 "Moon colony") by Huangjiang Diaosou, the 1905 short story Xin Faluo Xiansheng Tan (新法螺先生谭; "The New Account of Mr. Windbag") by Xu Nianci, the 1908 work Xin shitou ji (新石頭記, the new "Story of the Stone") by Wu Jianren, the 1908 work New Era (Xin jiyuan), and the 1910 work Xin Zhongguo ("New China") by Lu Shi'e.

Chapter 6, "Return to Go: Contemporary Chinese Fiction and Its late Qing Antecedents," discusses how Chinese fiction from the late 1980s to the present, including works considered to be avant-garde or experimental, is connected with late Qing fiction. Origins of the modern fiction analyzed in this chapter include Mainland China, Hong Kong, and Taiwan. The author used this as the final chapter instead of making a separate conclusion chapter. According to Wang the same genres appearing in late Qing fiction are also reflected in late 20th century Chinese fiction. Hegel argued that this chapter was "disappointing" compared to the other chapters, since the content was too short and lacked detail. Hegel states that the comparisons made are "likely to offend" and "courageous". This chapter discusses Farewell My Concubine by Lilian Lee (Li Bihua); Red Sorghum by Mo Yan, which David Wang compares to late Qing wuxia works; and works by Li Ang, Jia Pingwa, Su Tong, and Wang Anyi. Elisabeth Eide, who wrote a review for the Bulletin of the School of Oriental and African Studies, wrote that the author ";largely succeeds" in demonstrating that Qing dynasty modernisms experienced a hiatus during the May Fourth Movement and later developed into those of the late 20th century, and that this chapter "offers many interesting reflections on literature in general and Chinese literature as such."

C. D. Alison Bailey of the University of British Columbia argued that the court case and chivalric chapter and the science fantasy chapter both had the "most persuasive, indeed fascinating" analysis.

== Reception ==
Bailey argued that the book was "an innovative, energetically argued, and important book, as varied and rich as the period and genres it opens up for us so fruitfully and eloquently." She argued that sometimes it seemed like "modernity" was used to mean "variety". Bailey believed that some of the summarization present in the book did not adequately cover its depth due to the coverage of works unfamiliar at the time to the audience and the book's scope itself. She stated that sometimes there was too much repetition, believing that Wang might have been unsure about the comprehension levels of his readers, and that there were errors in romanizations and other mistakes in typing. She also stated the bibliography and glossary were not fully developed.

Eide concluded that the book as a whole "will serve as a useful source book for future research" and that the four primary chapters "are very well argued".

Hegel wrote that the book is equally "informative" and "fascinating to read" since Wang used "great enthusiasm and authority" when writing it. While Fin-de-Siècle Splendor had bibliographic referencing for cited works that had been reprinted recently, Hegel argues that the book should have included that referencing for all of the works cited. Hegel concluded that his criticisms were "small" and that the book is "an excellent introduction to the literature of that period."

Heraldová stated that the book was an "important contribution".

Michel Hockx wrote in the Journal of the Royal Asiatic Society that the book is "a joy to read" due to the author's "enthusiasm and devotion".

Huters argued that the book was "the best introduction to and analysis of late Qing fiction that exists in any language." Huters argued that by expanding the scope of late Qing fiction, Wang inadvertently blurred the distinction between that genre and early 20th century Chinese fiction, and he also argued that the deliberate vagueness and redefining of "the modern," "modernism" and "modernisms" "serves simply to push back the definition of the modern to a point seventy years before 1919."

Xiaobing Tang of the University of Chicago wrote that overall the book "should be recognized as an important development in the much needed research on late-Qing fiction"; he disagreed with some of the conclusions made by Wang about the nature of the genre.

J. W. Walls of Choice: Current Reviews for Academic Libraries stated that the book was "Readable and riveting, competently and persuasively presented."

Williams stated that the arguments were done "cogently" and that it is "a major contribution to scholarship on late imperial and twentieth- century Chinese fiction."

== See also ==
- Chinese Fiction of the Nineteenth and Early Twentieth Centuries
- The Chinese Novel at the Turn of the Century
