= A Flower in a Sinful Sea =

Novel by Jin Tianhe and Zeng Pu

Cover of A Flower in a Sinful Sea, collected by the Fudan University

Cover of a 1917 edition of the novel, collected by the National Library of China

A 1943 edition of the novel

A Flower in a Sinful Sea (Chinese: 孽海花; pinyin: Nièhǎihuā; Wade–Giles: Nieh^{4}-hai^{3}-hua^{1}) is a novel by Jin Tianhe (also known as Jin Songcen) and Zeng Pu (also written as Tseng P'u). First published in serial installments beginning in 1904, the work is a roman à clef. The work was partially translated to English by Rafe de Crespigny and Liu Ts'un-yan in 1982. It was also translated to French and Russian.

== Title ==
The nie (孽; niè; nieh) refers to retributions. The hua (花; huā; hua^{1}) for "flower" is a polysemy as it can also refer to "woman". In addition the word sounds similar to hua (traditional Chinese: 華; simplified Chinese: 华; pinyin: huá; Wade–Giles: hua^{2}), meaning China.

The title has also been translated as Flower in a Sea of Sin, Flower in the Sea of Retribution, Flower in the World of Retribution, Flower in a Sea of Karma, Flower in the Sea of Evil or A Flower in an Ocean of Sin.

== Plot ==
In the earlier versions of the novel by Jin Tianhe, Sai Jinhua, a courtesan, travels to the west with her husband, a scholar. They meet Russian anarchists and the novel describes the history of the Russian anarchist movement.

In the revised version by Zeng Pu, the prolog describes an "Island of Happy Slaves" attached to the city of Shanghai that has a population of ignorant people who party and have savageness. This is sinking into the ocean, but island's residents die without realizing that the lack of air is killing them. Milena Doleželová-Velingerová, the author of "Chapter 38: Fiction from the End of the Empire to the Beginning of the Republic (1897–1916)", wrote that "the prolog foretells the theme of the whole novel by a synecdoche". In the main story, Jin Wenqing breaks a promise to marry someone, and this leads to the woman committing suicide. Twenty years later, Jin Wenqing, a high official enjoying a luxurious life, gets into a relationship Fu Caiyun, a sing-song girl. However Fu Caiyun is in fact an image of the woman who had committed suicide. Jin Wenqing makes Fu Caiyun his concubine. Over the course of the novel, a pattern of retributions, specifically Buddhist-style retributions, occur against Jin Wenqing, punishing him for his actions. Jin Wenqing becomes a diplomat and travels to Europe. There he is unsuccessful as a government minister and does not grasp the world outside of China. Meanwhile, Fu Caiyun, who cheats on him, wins favors of several royal families, including Empress Victoria of Germany, and becomes friends with the Russian nihilist Sara Aizenson.

Jin Wenqing returns to China and then falls into disgrace. When he dies, everyone around him has abandoned him. Fu Caiyun runs away from Jin Wenqing's family after his death. At the end of the story Fu Caiyun is engaged in a relationship to a Beijing opera singer. Ultimately the novel was never finished. The table of contents of the novel states that Fu Caiyun will reunite with Count Waldersee, but this portion was never written.

The revised novel describes the upper class of China resident in Beijing and Shanghai during final 25 years of the 19th century and compares the fate of the said upper class to that of Jin Wenqing.

== Development ==
Jin Tianhe wrote the original five chapters of the project. It was originally a political novel criticizing Russian advances into China. Two of the chapters were published in Jiangsu (江蘇; 江苏; Jiāngsū; Chiang^{1}-su^{1}), a magazine that was published in Jiangsu and ran from 1903 to 1904. Zeng Pu wrote that the five Jin Tianhe chapters "concentrate too much on the protagonist, so they at most describe an extraordinary courtesan, and along with her, a number of historical anecdotes." Zeng Pu stated that if the original conception of the novel succeeded "it would be no more than the Li Xiangjun of Taohua shan, or the Chen Yuanyuan of Cangsang yan [traditional Chinese: 滄桑豔; simplified Chinese: 沧桑艳; pinyin: Cāngsāng yàn; Wade–Giles: Ts'ang-sang yen]."

In 1904 Zeng Pu took control of the novel. Subsequently, the first two volumes of the novel were published by the Grove of Fiction publishing company in 1905. Each of these volumes contained 10 chapters. Four additional chapters were serialized in The Grove of Fiction magazine in 1907. These chapters were intended to be in a third volume but this volume was never published. In 1928 Zeng Pu reworked the novel into a thirty chapter version and published this version. Ultimately Zeng Pu completed the novel, transforming it into historical fiction. Zeng Pu argued that in his conception "the protagonist functions as the thread which I attempt to link together the history of the past thirty years." The University of Hong Kong Libraries wrote that "Although Zeng Pu was an avid reader of French literature in the original, the influence of his Western models on NHH comes out most clearly in the transformations of traditional Chinese motifs."

The novel, beginning with Chapter 22, was published in the magazine Xiaoshuo Lin (小說林; 小说林; Xiǎoshuō lín; Hsiao^{3}-shuo^{1} lin^{2} "Novel Collection"). The chapters did not appear in consecutive issues, but instead were published in a sporadic manner.

== Purpose and style ==
The novel indirectly criticized the Qing dynasty government and promoted the values of democracy. The author uses the motif of the courtesan or the beautiful lady and the scholar in order to create a reflection of the intelligentsia in the late Qing dynasty.

== Characters ==
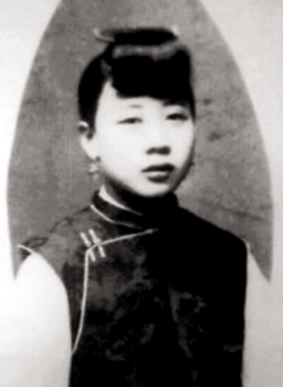
Sai Jinhua in 1887. The character of Fu Caiyun is based on her.

Characters in the Zeng Pu versions:

- Jin Jun (金 鈞; 金 钧; Jīn Jūn; Chin^{1} Chün^{1}) or Jin Wenqing (金雯青; Jīn Wénqīng; Chin Wen-ch'ing) is an official who is brought down by a series of retributions. Jin Jun is based on Hong Jun. Jin Jun is intended to represent a late Qing politician, being either a model or a caricature of such.
  - David Der-wei Wang wrote that Jin Wenqing is "as much a cuckold in the bedroom as he is a dupe in the councilroom." The author added that "The bedroom comedy between" Jin Wenqing and Fu Caiyun "may well be read as a political satire, pointing to the impotence and corruption of the late Qing court."
- Fu Caiyun (傅彩雲; 傅彩云; Fù Cǎiyún; Fu^{4} Ts'ai^{3}-yün^{2}), a sing-song girl who becomes Jin Wenqing's concubine. She is in fact an image of a woman who was wronged by Jin Wenqing. Fu Caiyun cheats on him.
  - David Der-wei Wang, author of Fin-de-siècle Splendor: Repressed Modernities of Late Qing Fiction, 1849-1911, stated that compared to her husband, Fu Caiyun "is much more resourceful in every aspect of life." Fu Caiyun had performed better in her zhuangyuan imperial examination than her husband did in the portions regarding foreign customs and languages. Keith McMahon, author of Polygamy and Sublime Passion: Sexuality in China on the Verge of Modernity, wrote that this was "another symbol of the Chinese man's endemic failure to understand China's need to adapt." David Wang stated that Fu Caiyun is "a highly dynamic character" who is "never a pure, virtuous woman." Liu Jianmei, author of Revolution Plus Love: Literary History, Women's Bodies, and Thematic Repetition in Twentieth-Century Chinese Fiction, wrote that Fu Caiyun is both a "promiscuous femme fatale and a national heroine."
  - Fu Caiyun is based on Sai Jinhua. Ying Hu, author of Tales of Translation: Composing the New Woman in China, 1899-1918, wrote that Sai Jinhua's portrayal in that work was "resolutely ambiguous."
- Sara Aizenson: Sara, a Russian nihilist, becomes friends with Fu Caiyun. While accompanying Fu Caiyun, Sara talks about Sophia Perovskaya. Despite the exposure to the ideals, Fu Caiyun does not become a revolutionary. Her name is also rendered as "Xialiya".

== Analysis ==
Peter Li's essay on the book, "The Dramatic Structure of Niehai hua", published in The Chinese Novel at the Turn of the Century. argues that the "architectonic" construction and "incremental dramatic development" are the two principles within the novel's structure. Li discusses the protagonist, the setting, foreshadowing within the story, and the general plot.

Robert E. Hegel's review of The Chinese Novel at the Turn of the Century notes that Li's essay "appears to be an early version of an essay a longer version of which forms Chapter 4 of his Tseng P'u. Cordell D. K. Yee's review of the book argues that Li's essay shows "little evidence of symmetrical design, or even "dramatic" structure" and "seems to lose sight" of the argument stated, that the analysis process became "almost an end in itself".

== Translations ==
The first five chapters were translated as A Flower in a Sinful Sea (translated by Rafe de Crespigny and Liu Ts'un-yan), Renditions (17 & 18), 1982, pp. 137–92.

An edition in French, titled Fleur sur l'Océan des Péchés and translated by Isabelle Bijon, was published by Éditions Trans-Europe-Repress (TER) in March 1983.

== See also ==
- The Sea of Regret
