= The Chinese Novel at the Turn of the Century =

1980 chronicle of late Qing Chinese literature

- Editor: Milena Doleželová-Velingerová
- Language: English
- Genre: Non-fiction
- Publisher: University of Toronto Press
- Publication date: 1980
- Publication place: Canada

The Chinese Novel at the Turn of the Century is a 1980 book edited by Milena Doleželová-Velingerová, published by the University of Toronto Press. It was the first book that had been written in a Western language that chronicled fiction published in the final 15 years of the Qing Dynasty, from 1897 to 1910.

== Development ==
The book was created by a University of Toronto joint research seminar about late Qing fiction that began in 1971.

== Content ==
The front page of the November 10, 1897 Guowen Bao, a newspaper from Tianjin, is used as the front cover of the book. In that issue, the editors of the paper, Yan Fu (a.k.a. Yen Fu) and Xia Zengyou, posted an announcement that the newspaper's literary supplement was beginning.

The book includes a total of nine essays. The essays discuss critical theories and historical significance of various works. Cordell D.K. Yee's review noted that the conventional viewpoint regarding Qing Dynasty novels was that they were "loosely plotted, consisting of episodes simply strung together." Many of the authors of the pieces in this book argued that previous critics of late Qing Dynasty works, such as Lu Xun and Hu Shih, did not grasp the formal sophistication present in the works. Contributors argue that novels belong to specific organizing principles and discuss the structure of the works. They believe that the authors had a higher consciousness of structure than previous analyses had concluded.

Three essays are included in the first portion of the book. "The Rise of 'New Fiction'", by Shu-ying Tsau discusses essays by Yan Fu, Liang Qichao (Liang Ch'i-ch'ao), and other intellectuals which advocated for fiction that called for modernization, since the authors believed fiction had the ability to influence minds of people. The other essays, "Typology of Plot Structures in Late Qing Novels" and "Narrative Modes in Late Qing Novels," were written by the book's editor. In the first essay she discusses different plot structures in Qing Dynasty novels, including Bizarre Happenings Eyewitnessed over Two Decades by Wu Jianren (Wu Woyao). Her second essay discusses three narrative modes in the novels.

Chapters about specific late Qing works make up the second half of the book. Robert E. Hegel's review states that each essay in the second portion "breaks new ground by presenting in English an intelligent discussion either of a previously overlooked work or of a new approach to one better known". After the editor, Donald Holoch is the second largest contributor to the work. His essay, "A Novel of Setting: The Bureaucrats", concerns Li Baojia's (Li Boyuan) Officialdom Unmasked, and his "The Travels of Laocan: Allegorical Narrative" concerns The Travels of Lao Can by Liu E (Liu O). Next is Gilbert Chu Fu Fong, "Time in Nine Murders: Western Influence and Domestic Tradition" about Jiuming Qiyuan by Wu Jianren, followed by Michael Egan, "Characterization in Sea of Woe" concerning Henhai ("Sea of Woe"), also by Wu Jianren. Peter Li wrote "The Dramatic Structure of Niehai Hua" about Niehai Hua by Jin Tianhe and Zeng Pu. Jean Duval wrote The Nine-Tailed Turtle: Pornography or 'Fiction of Exposure'" about The Nine-Tailed Turtle by Zhang Chunfan (T: 張春帆, S: 张春帆, Pinyin: Zhāng Chūnfān, Wade-Giles: Chang Ch'un-fan).

The book includes illustrations of the covers of several works. They include a 1903 issue of Xiuxiang xiaoshuo (T: 繡像小說, S: 绣像小说, P: Xiùxiàng xiǎoshuō, W: Hsiu-hsiang Hsiao-shuo; "Illustrated Fiction" or "Fiction Illustrated"), the first edition of the novel Wenming Xiaoshi by Li Baojia, and the cover of Hen hai. The book concludes with biographies of five novelists from the late Qing era with sources cited, a bibliography of materials in Chinese history and literary theory related to fiction in the late Qing era, and a glossary covering names, titles, and terms.

== Reception ==
W. L. Idema wrote in T'oung Pao that the book is "beautifully executed, befitting the quality of its contents." Yin C. Liu wrote in Bulletin of the School of Oriental and African Studies that "Altogether this book is an interesting and worthy addition to the reference shelf." Liu argued that "The scholarliness and thoughtfulness of the editor[...]permeates the whole book, and in particular, her own contributions". Robert E. Hegel wrote that the editor "has extended a much needed and very welcome 'boost up' to the study of late Qing fiction and has helped to demonstrate something of the literary treasures to be found there." Bruce Doar wrote that the "handsomely packaged collection of studies" had an "excellent bibliography" and "high quality illustrations" and that it was "an indispensable reference work not only for students of late Qing literature but 20th century Chinese literature in general."

Richard John Lynn in Pacific Affairs argued that the editor correctly stated that traditional times had major evolutionary processes that lead to the modern period but that the editor and the authors had not "realized the full extent of this interaction and influence" and that he believed they did not "entirely emancipated themselves from the limitations of May Fourth iconoclasm." Lynn argued that even with his critiques, "there is no doubt that this is a very significant contribution to the study of Chinese fiction" and he praised the editor and authors for "presenting a new and challenging look at the premodern-modern watershed in Chinese literary history".

Cordell D. K. Yee in Journal of Asian Studies argued that the essays had "various degrees of persuasiveness". Yee argued that "the hypothesis that Late Qing novels exerted as great an influence on May Fourth fiction as Western works did awaits further proof." He also stated that seven of the nine articles "generally do not challenge the received interpretations (from critics like A Ying, Lu Xun, and Hu Shih) of late Qing fiction as "novels of exposure" (qianze xiaoshuo), which depict political and social decay." Yee concluded that the work was "a useful beginning" for examining late Qing fiction.

== See also ==
- Chinese Fiction of the Nineteenth and Early Twentieth Centuries
- Fin-de-Siècle Splendor
