= C. T. Hsia =

Chinese literary critic (1921–2013)

- 夏志清
- Born: Chih-tsing Hsia; January 11, 1921; Pudong, Shanghai, China
- Died: December 29, 2013 (aged 92); Manhattan, New York, U.S.

Academic background
- Education: Peking University; University of Shanghai; Yale University

Academic work
- Discipline: History; Chinese literature
- Institutions: Columbia University

Hsia Chih-tsing
- Chinese: 夏志清
Transcriptions
Standard Mandarin
- Hanyu Pinyin: Xià Zhìqīng
- Wade–Giles: Hsia4 Chih4-ch'ing1

Hsia Chih-tsing (Chinese: 夏志清; January 11, 1921 – December 29, 2013), or C. T. Hsia, was a Chinese historian and literary theorist. He contributed to the introduction of modern Chinese literature to the Western world by promoting the works of once marginalized writers in the 1960s. Today, C. T. Hsia is considered one of the most important critics of Chinese literature.

== Biography ==
=== Career ===
C. T. Hsia was born in Pudong, Shanghai, in 1921. His father Ta-Tung was a banker before the Communist came to power in 1949. In 1942, C. T. Hsia graduated from Hujiang University with a B.A in English Literature. After teaching at Peking University in 1946, C. T. Hsia moved to the United States in 1947, where he enrolled in Yale University's English Department. He wrote his dissertation on the realist poet George Crabbe, and obtained his PhD in 1951. In 1961, C. T. Hsia joined Columbia University and taught Chinese literature there until his retirement in 1991. Thanks to his work, Columbia University became "one of the strongest institutions in Chinese literature in Western academia." In 2006, Hsia was inducted into Academia Sinica at the age of 85, rendering him the oldest person ever to receive this appointment. Hsia joked about this experience, saying that he felt like "a new bride".

=== Family Members ===
C.T. Hsia married his wife Della Wang in 1969. His survivors include two daughters, Joyce McClain and Natalie Hsia; a son, Ming Hsia; and four grandchildren. C.T. Hsia has a brother Tsi-an Hsia, who is a Chinese literary critic and a scholar of Chinese Communist Party history. C.T. Hsia also has a sister Yu-ying Hsia.

=== Death ===
C.T. Hsia died in New York City on December 29, 2013, at the age of 92, and a funeral service for him took place on January 18, 2014.

== Scholarship and legacy ==
=== The pioneer of modern Chinese literature studies in the English-speaking world ===
C. T. Hsia is often considered "the most influential critic of Chinese fiction since the 1960s" and his essays have become an essential part of the scholarship on Chinese literature. With the publication in 1961 of A History of Modern Chinese Fiction, 1917–1957, C. T. Hsia introduced modern Chinese literature to the West by "providing a close analysis and the first English translations of writers who are now widely recognized," thereby establishing "modern Chinese literature as an academic discipline in the English-speaking world.

=== Contributions to the study of classical Chinese fiction ===
As a literary critic, C. T. Hsia was instrumental in shaping a modern understanding of classical Chinese fiction. The Classic Chinese Novel, first published in 1968 and reprinted several times, is an introduction for Western readers to the six novels of the Ming and Qing dynasties which Hsia considered to be of highest value: Romance of the Three Kingdoms; Water Margin; Journey to the West; Jin Ping Mei (Golden Lotus); The Scholars; and Dream of the Red Chamber. Through his analysis of these six novels, C. T. Hsia identifies the essence of a 'great tradition' for Chinese fiction, thus compelling Cyril Birch to write that this book "is more than an admirable interpretation of six novels. It is a study of Chinese values which should appear near the top of the most selective reading-list." The critic Andrew H. Plaks says that the term "six classic novels" (gudian xiaoshuo) as a "neologism of twentieth century scholarship, seems to have come into common use under the influence of C. T. Hsia's Classic Chinese Novel, a view now reflected in a wide variety of critical writings."

=== Rediscovering and showcasing marginalized modern Chinese writers ===
C. T. Hsia was particularly adept at rediscovering and showcasing marginalized writers like Shen Congwen, Qian Zhongshu, or Eileen Chang. On the later, he writes: "to the discerning student of modern Chinese literature, Eileen Chang is not only the best and most important writer in Chinese today; her short stories alone invite valid comparisons with, and in some respects claim superiority over, the work of serious modern women writers in English Katherine Mansfield, Katherine Anne Porter, Eudora Welty, and Carson McCullers." Although Eileen Chang's success was immediate in the Chinese-speaking world, it was not until the 1960s and the publication of C. T. Hsia's A History of Modern Chinese Fiction, that she became famous in the Western world. Karen S. Kingsbury thus notes: "As C. T. Hsia, one of her earliest and most perceptive advocates, remarked (in A History of Modern Chinese Fiction), mid-century American readers' view of China were greatly influenced by writers like Pearl. S. Buck, which left them unprepared for Chang's melancholy incisiveness and insider's perspective."

=== C.T. Hsia and Eileen Chang ===
C. T. Hsia's scholarship encompasses many Chinese authors and genres, he is particularly associated with Eileen Chang's works. In 1957, C. T. Hsia published a full-length study of Eileen Chang in Wenxue zazhi, a Taiwanese literary journal edited by his brother T. A. Hsia, thus launching Chang studies. In 1981, it was at Hsia's recommendation that Eileen Chang expressed an interest in having her English translation of Han Bangqing's Sing-Song Girls of Shanghai published by Columbia University Press. Although Chang changed her mind a year later, this translation was eventually published in 2005 thanks to the support and recommendation of C. T. Hsia and Joseph Lau. In 1998, C. T. Hsia published his correspondence with Eileen Chang in Lianhe wenxue, a Chinese literary journal, thus contributing primary sources to scholarship on Eileen Chang. The original letters are now part of the Ailing Zhang Papers collection of the University of Southern California.

=== Publications covered a wide range of topics ===
In addition to his two monumental works, A History of Modern Chinese Fiction and The Classic Chinese Novel, C. T. Hsia also published many articles "ranging from nineteenth century literati culture and novels (on The Flowers in the Mirror [Jinghuayuan 鏡花緣]) to modern national discourse and family romance (on the fiction of Tuan-mu Hung-liang 端木 蕻良), and from the dialectic of passion and life in the Ming drama (on The Peony Pavilion [Mudanting 牡丹 亭]) to the dialectic of passion and death in the early Republican Mandarin Duck and Butterfly fiction (on the Jade Pear Spirit [Yulihun 玉梨魂])."

== Criticism ==
Despite his monumental works on Chinese literature, C. T. Hsia was often criticized for his "Eurocentric, anticommunist stance as well as his New Critical criteria." Hsia's disagreement with the Czech critic Jaroslav Prusek over his unfavorable view of Lu Xun, as well as the methodology and ideology of Chinese literary studies, thus "marked a crucial moment of literary politics during the Cold War era." Leo Ou-fan Lee, who claims both Prusek and Hsia as his mentors, writes that Prusek's review of History of Modern Chinese Fiction and Hsia's reply "can be regarded as the methodological groundwork of the discipline." Prusek, Lee goes on, faults Hsia for being "politically biased and failing to grasp the 'objective truth', as would benefit a 'scientific endeavor". Hsia's "rebuttal", Lee continues, takes direct issue with Prusek's "scientific' methodology, which he charges with the "intentional fallacy", that is, confusing the author's intention with the content of the text.

=== Less theory-laden work ===
The introduction to the third edition of Hsia's A History of Modern Chinese Fiction by David Der-Wei Wang offers several suggestions for interpreting Hsia's approach to literary criticism. In the case of A History of Modern Chinese Fiction, Wang argues that this voluminous work remains relevant although it is much less theory-laden than its counterparts for Western literary texts. Wang observes that Hsia's literary history was controversial in Mainland China due to its perceived hostility to leftist literature. Nevertheless, Hsia's work, according to Wang, avoids being "reflectionist" or "moralist."

=== Unpatriotic literary criticism viewed by nationalistic Chinese ===
C. T. Hsia's essay "Obsession with China" concentrated the criticism. To Hsia, "modern Western authors use literary techniques to critique modernity, giving voice to our collective disappointment and disillusionment. Modern Chinese authors, however, labor under a historically imposed limitation in that they restrict their critiques to the dark side of Chinese society, not human society in general." Leo Ou-fan Lee explains that many nationalist Chinese considered this view unpatriotic and politically biased.

== Selected works ==
=== Books ===
- 鸡窗集 (Rooster by the Window) (1964).
- 中国现代小说史 (A History of Modern Chinese Fiction) (1961).
- 中国古典小说 (The Classic Chinese Novel: A Critical Introduction)(1968).
- 爱情社会小说 (Love, Society, and the Novel)(1970).
- 二十世纪中国小说选 (Twentieth-Century Chinese Stories)(1971).
- 文学的前途 (The Future of Literature)(1974).
- 夏济安日记 (The Diary of Hsia Tai-An, (1946)), published in 1975.( Editor and annotator)
- 人的文学 (Humane Literature) (1977).
- 新文学的传统 (Chinese Literature: The New Tradition) (1979)
- 中国现代中短篇小说 (Modern Chinese Stories and Novellas,1919–1949)(1981). Coeditor with S.M Lau, and Leo Ou-fan Lee.
- 印象的组合 (A System of Impressions) (1982).

=== Articles in English ===
- "To What Fyn Lyve I Thus? – Society and Self in Chinese Short Story" (1962)
- "Comparative Approaches to Water Margin" (1962)
- "Residual Feminity: Women in Chinese Communist Fiction" (1963)
- "Love and Compassion in Dream of the Red Chamber" (1963)
- ——— (1963), "On the 'Scientific' Study of Modern Chinese Literature: A Reply to Professor Prusek", T'oung Pao, 50: 428–, doi:10.1163/156853263X00038
