= Michael Ruetz =

German photographer (1940–2024)

- Ruetz c. 1990
- Born: 4 April 1940; Berlin, Germany
- Died: 2 December 2024 (aged 84); Berlin, Germany
- Occupations: Photographer; Artist; Author
- Awards: Villa Massimo; Ordre des Arts et des Lettres

Michael Ruetz (4 April 1940 – 2 December 2024) was a German photographer, artist, journalist and author. He became first known for photos of the West German student movement that were published by international papers and magazines. Ruetz covered the 1968 invasion of Czechoslovakia by Soviet troops and military dictatorship in Greece. He focused later on cultural-historical and documentary projects, exploring the "visual world" of Johann Wolfgang von Goethe and Theodor Fontane in series such as In Goethe's Footsteps. Projects after the 1980s deal with visualizing time and transience, photographing the same objects again and again over a long time.

== Life and career ==
Ruetz was born in Berlin on 4 April 1940. His ancestors were from Riga, where they worked as printers, journalists and publishers. After attending school in Bremen, Ruetz studied sinology, with Japanology and journalism as secondary subjects, at the University of Freiburg, in Munich and Berlin. Until 1969 he worked on a dissertation on the novel A Flower in a Sinful Sea by Zeng Pu (1905). He studied photography at the Hochschule für Bildende Künste with Heinz Hajek-Halke. In 1976, Ruetz graduated as external student from the Folkwang Hochschule in Essen.

Ruetz was a member of the staff of Stern magazine in Hamburg from 1969 to 1974. Later he worked as a freelance author and photographer. From 1981, Ruetz was a contract author for publishers Little, Brown & Co in Boston, Massachusetts. In 1982, he became professor of communication design at the Braunschweig University of Art and taught photography until 2007.

Ruetz was the sole heir of Hajek-Halke's artistic work and managed his estate from 1983 until 2020. He organised major retrospectives of Hajek-Halke at the Centre Pompidou in Paris in 2002, at Kunstbibliothek Berlin and at the Academy of Arts, Berlin, in 2012.

Ruetz was a member of the German Society for Photography (DGPh), the Gesellschaft Deutscher Lichtbildner (GDL)/Deutsche Foto Akademie and the Academy of Arts, Berlin. He was vice president of the Academy's section for film and media from 2016 to 2018. In May 2002 he was appointed a member of the Ordre des Arts et Lettres.

Ruetz lived in Italy, Australia and the United States for 12 years. He settled with his family in the Chiemgau where they lived for 23 years, and later returned to Berlin.

Ruetz died on 2 December 2024, at the age of 84, at the Deutsches Herzzentrum Berlin.

== Work ==
Ruetz became first known through his photographs of the West German student movement during his studies. His portraits of the Außerparlamentarische Opposition (APO), now part of German photographic history, were immediately bought by major newspapers and magazines in Germany and abroad, including Time, Life, Der Spiegel and Stern. In 1968, Ruetz covered the invasion of Czechoslovakia by Soviet troops (Prague Spring) and reported for Stern on the military dictatorship in Greece, as on the World Festival of Youth and Students 1973 and the International Workers' Day 1974 in East Berlin. He later accompanied François Mitterrand on his election campaign, visited Chile after the victory of Salvador Allende and reported on the war in Guinea-Bissau and on many other international events.

After spending several years in the United States and Australia, Ruetz began to concentrate increasingly on cultural-historical and documentary projects, such as the exploration of the "visual world" of such figures as Johann Wolfgang von Goethe and Theodor Fontane creating series like In Goethe's Footsteps, With Goethe in Switzerland, Me Too in Arcadia/Goethe's Italian Journeys, and Fontane's Walks Through Mark Brandenburg.

An extensive study of the phenomena of European necropoles followed. His works after the 1980s deal with the capability of visualizing time and transience. Projects like Second Sight, Timescape and The Perennial Eye, assembled under the main title Eye on Time, document the change of the world's surface during time. In contrast to the individual picture pairs of the Second Sight project, Timescape comprises photographic sequences made over many years. The project consists of more than 300 series of different objects. The photographs give a clear indication of how much people, places, squares, apartments, and nature are in a state of change. What does not change, however, is the geographical vantage point of each photographic series. In Berlin, he visited 180 points in the city and vicinity up to 24 times each year over several years.

== Awards ==
- Kodak Photobook Prize for Auf Goethes Spuren (In Goethe's Footsteps), Necropolis, APO/Berlin 1966–1969 and Land der Griechen (Land of the Greeks).
- 1979 Schönstes Buch der Schweiz (Most Beautiful Swiss Book) for Mit Goethe in der Schweiz (With Goethe in Switzerland)
- 1969 German Design Prize
- 1979 Otto Steinert Prize
- 1981 Villa Massimo scholarship
- 2002 Ordre des Arts et des Lettres

== Exhibitions ==
=== Solo exhibitions ===
- 1969 Berlin, Galerie Mikro
- 1974 Hamburg, Kunsthalle, The World of Caspar David Friedrich
- 1975 Hanover, Galerie Spectrum
- 1975 Lissabon, German Institute
- 1976 Berlin, Bielefeld, Göttingen, Hamburg, Copenhagen and Munich, Necropolis
- 1977 Berlin, Landesbildstelle, Pictures from Germany 1968–1975
- 1979 Zurich, Helmhaus, In Goethe's Footsteps
- 1980 Düsseldorf, Goethe-Museum, In Goethe's Footsteps
- 1981 Houston/Texas, Benteler Galleries
- 1987 Carmel/California, Photography West Gallery
- 1989–1995 Kiel, Harburg, Rendsburg, Itzehoe, Buxtehude, Lüneburg, Flensburg, Neumünster, Ahrensburg, Preetz, Rostock and Schwerin, Me too in Arcadia
- 1992 Potsdam, Kulturhaus, Theodor Fontane
- 1995 Berlin, Deutsches Historisches Museum, Eye on Time
- 1996 Berlin, Willy Brandt Haus
- 1996 Hamburg, Museum für Kunst und Gewerbe, Eye on Time
- 1998 Berlin, Galerie Eva Poll, A Library for the Eye
- 1998 Berlin, Willy Brandt Haus, Reviewing an Era
- 1999 Greimharting, A Library for the Eye
- 1999 Palermo, Goethe-Institut, Goethe in Arcadia, Et me in Italia
- 2001 Kunsthaus Lempertz, Berlin, Cologne and Bruxelles, WindEye
- 2001 Cologne, Galerie Priska Pasquer, Timescape, a Palimpsest and The Sixties in vintage prints
- 2001 Kunsthalle Erfurt, WindEye, Timescape – 2 Picture Cycles
- 2005 Academy of Arts, Berlin, Eye on Time
- 2007 Berlin, Willy-Brandt-Haus, Eye on Eternity
- 2008 Berlin, Academy of Arts, Berlin, 1968. Die Unbequeme Zeit.
- 2008 Barcelona, Goethe Institut Barcelona, 1968. Die Unbequeme Zeit.
- 2008 Berlin, Deutsches Historisches Museum, Eye on Time.
- 2009–2010 Helsinki, Goethe Institut Helsinki, 1968. Die Unbequeme Zeit
- 2010 Madrid, Goethe Institut Madrid, 1968. Die Unbequeme Zeit
- 2010 Tbilissi, Goethe Institut Tbilissi, 1968. Die Unbequeme Zeit
- 2010 Berlin, Eye on Life – Die unbequeme Zeit, Johanna Breede, Berlin.
- 2011 Potsdam, Kunstraum Potsdam, Sichtbare Zeit II.
- 2014 Berlin, Willy-Brandt-Haus, Portugal im Jahre Null
- 2015 Berlin, Galerie Pankow, Facing Time.
- 2017 Boston, Goethe Institut Boston, Die Unbequeme Zeit .
- 2024 Poesie der Zeit. Michael Ruetz – Timescapes 1966–2023

=== Group exhibitions ===
- 1968 Prague
- 1972 Kassel, Documenta V
- 1973, 1979 Essen, Folkwang Museum
- 1974, 1978 London, Institute of Contemporary Arts
- 1975 Essen, Haus Industrieform
- 1976 London, The Photographers' Gallery
- 1976 Vienna, Congress Amnesty International
- 1977, 1980 Munich Stadtmuseum/Fotomuseum
- 1979 Cologne, Galerie der DGPh
- 1980, 1981 Hamburg, Kunsthaus/Kunstverein and PPS-Galerie
- 1980, 1982 Washington, D.C., Sander Gallery
- 1980 Baltimore, Maryland, The Maryland Institute
- 1980 Berlin, Künstlerhaus Bethanien
- 1980 Munich, Stadtmuseum/Fotomuseum
- 1980 Kassel, Fotoforum
- 1980 Wolfsburg, Kunstverein
- 1981 Houston, Texas, Benteler Galleries und Rice University
- 1982 Cologne, Benteler Galleries
- 1982 New York, Photographic Art Dealers Convention
- 1983 Hanover, Galerie Spectrum
- 1985 Düsseldorf, Kunsthalle
- 1985 Zurich, Kunsthaus
- 1985 Rome, Deutsche Akademie/Villa Massimo
- 1987 Darmstadt, Kunsthalle
- 1995 Hanover, Kunstverein and Sprengel Museum
- 1997 Bonn, Kunsthalle der Bundesrepublik Deutschland
- 1998 Berlin, Haus am Waldsee, Die Römische Spur
- 1998 Düsseldorf, Galerie Zimmer
- 1998 Erfurt, Galerie Am Fischmarkt
- 1998 Hamburg, Stern, Seeing the World
- 1999 Berlin, Deutsches Historisches Museum, Bonn, Kunstmuseum and Galerie der Stadt Stuttgart, Seeing the World
- 2000 Paris, Paris Photo, Galerie Priska Pasquer, The Perennial Eye
- 2001 Berlin, Galerie Brusberg/Der Spiegel, The Sixties
- 2001 Paris, Paris Photo, Galerie Priska Pasquer, Timescape
- 2002 Berlin, Willy Brandt Haus, Willy Brandt
- 2002 Berlin, Galerie Brusberg/Willy Brandt Haus, The Sixties
- 2002 Leipzig, The Sixties
- 2002 Paris, Paris Photo, Galerie Priska Pasquer, Massimo Passacaglia
- 2003 Bonn, Friedrich-Ebert-Stiftung
- 2003 Osnabrück, Kunsthalle Dominikanerkirche,
- 2003 Halle, Galerie Kommode
- 2003 Karlsruhe
- 2003 Eisenach, Stadtschloss
- 2003 Göttingen, Künstlerhaus
- 2003 Lübeck, Kunsthaus
- 2003 Prague, City Gallery and Berlin, Deutsches Historisches Museum, Von Körpern und anderen Dingen. Contemporary German Photography
- 2003 Paris, Paris Photo, Galerie Priska Pasquer, Eye on Eternity
- 2004 Moscow and Bochum, Von Körpern und anderen Dingen. Contemporary German Photography
- 2013 Berlin, Willy-Brandt-Haus, Puro Pueblo. Chile 1971–73.
- 2013 Berlin, Johanna Breede, Frauen / Women.
- 2014 Berlin, Johanna Breede, Men / Männer.
- 2015 Berlin, Johanna Breede, The Window – Das Fenster.
- 2016 Berlin, Academy of Arts, DEMO:POLIS.
- 2016 Berlin, Johanna Breede, Vis-à-Vis.
- 2017 Berlin, Johanna Breede, Favorite Images / Lieblingsbilder.
- 2018 Murnau, Kunststiftung Petra Benteler, Im Blauen Land.
- 2021 Köln, Van der Grinten Galerie, Im Dialog mit Joseph Beuys.

== Documentary film ==
- 2023 Facing Time, Direction: Annett Ilijew
