= The Nine-tailed Turtle =

Novel by Zhang Chunfan

- Traditional Chinese: 九尾龜
- Simplified Chinese: 九尾龟
Transcriptions
Standard Mandarin
- Hanyu Pinyin: Jiǔ Wěi Guī
- Wade–Giles: Chiu3 Wei3 Kuei1

The Nine-tailed Turtle (Chinese: 九尾龜, also translated as Nine-tailed Turtles, Nine-headed Turtle, or Nine-times Cuckold) is a novel by Zhang Chunfan (1872-1935), an author from Piling (near modern-day Changzhou). The novel centres around the life of a scholar named Zhang Qiugu, who leaves his wife to spend time with famous courtesans in China's pleasure districts.

The book was published serially from 1906 to 1910, and consisted of 192 chapters, making it one of the longest novels produced in early 20th century China's late Qing Dynasty and early Republic of China era. During that time, it was "phenomenally popular", and was one of the most widely read books of the 1920s; it was also one of the most popular novels of its time written partly in Wu Chinese. In the 20th century, many intellectuals criticized it for its erotic content, and during the intervening years it "fell into oblivion", with the result that by the 1980s it was difficult to obtain even a Chinese copy of the novel. New editions and print runs in the 21st century returned the book's availabiliity and circulation.

== Development ==
Wang Tao, a man who knew Zhang Chunfan, said that the novel was based on the author's real life love affair with a courtesan in Shanghai. Mainly due to commercial reasons, Zhang Chunfan found difficulty in ending the story at an opportune time, so he continued the novel until he exhausted his imagination. David Der-wei Wang argued that this may also be due to Zhang Chunfan's unwillingness to end the book with a standard "good ending", with the protagonist settling down to raise a family.

== Title ==
The book's title refers to the consequences of a scandal in the household of Kang Jisheng, a former Jiangxi governor. The novel explains that "turtle" is a derisive word for a husband with an unfaithful wife. In the case of Kang Jisheng, all nine women in his household are loose, so he has the name "nine-tailed Turtle". These consequences were described by David Wang as "laughable". The titular turtle and tails do not make up the main storyline.

== Plot ==
The story chronicles Zhang Qiugu, a scholar who travels for courtesans. Several tales of debauchery appear prior to the portion about Kang Jisheng. The titular scandal regarding Kang Jisheng's family appears within chapters 79-80 and 115-127, in the middle of the novel; it is not the main plot of the novel. Some critics of The Nine-tailed Turtle argue that the novel does not have a plot structure and the placement of the scandal is an example of that. David Wang argues that the scandal is "nonetheless the most exemplary, or the most spectacular, of the episodes of the novel that superficially caution against the dangers of debauchery." Zhang Qiugu marries one courtesan but after becoming married he continues to visit other prostitutes. In the second portion of the novel, Judge Investigator Jin hires Zhang Qiugu, who travels to Beijing and Tianjin, becoming involved with the women there. He partially wins the favor of his boss.

The essay "The Nine-Tailed Turtle: Pornography or 'Fiction of Exposure'" by Jean Duval, published in the book The Chinese Novel at the Turn of the Century, categorizes this novel as having a "string-like plot". Milena Doleželová-Velingerová, the editor of the book, describes the plot type as having "a string-like plot" which "consists of four planes: the main protagonist's story—the "string"; the secondary (optional) protagonist's story which parallels it; the sequence of self-contained anecdotes; and non-action material in a belletristic form (the last two being held solely together by the string."

== Purpose ==
David Der-wei Wang wrote that "the pedagogical dimension of the novel is unmistakable". He thought the moral is "one should play the game [of] sexual aberrations...the smart way so as to avoid monetary loss and family scandal", not that one should abstain from it altogether. Hu Shih and Lu Xun criticized it as "a textbook for brothel goers" (嫖界教科書; 嫖界教科书; piáojiè jiàokēshū; p'iao-chieh chiao-k'o-shu) and a "handbook for brothelgoers" (嫖界指南; piáojiè zhǐnán; p'iao-chieh chih-nan). In general, many critics of the work called it pornography.

Jean Duval argued that, while the novel is pornography, it includes social criticism and expresses the idea that emotions provide escape for people in a corrupted world, an idea he called "sentimentality". He said it served as a precursor to 1910s "Mandarin Ducks and Butterflies" romance fiction.

Robert E. Hegel, in The Chinese Novel at the Turn of the Century, wrote that Duval's essay "demonstrates that [the novel] is more than the "handbook for brothel-goers" it was originally claimed to be". Wang said it "does not merely tempt readers with depraved episodes and sensual female characters" but also includes instructions on how to deal with prostitutes of all levels, "how to squander money the right way, and, most important, how to become a versatile and responsible libertine". He argued a lack of eroticism within The Nine-Tailed Turtle disqualifies it as pornography despite the setting in a "world preoccupied with erotic impulses".

== Characters ==
- Zhang Qiugu (章秋谷; Zhāng Qiūgū; Chang Ch'iu-ku) - A scholar who has a faltering marriage and faces official corruption, Zhang Qiugu travels to brothels to find companionship. He helps friends avoid trouble from prostitutes who try to fraudulently take their money. David Wang wrote that Zhang Qiugu is presumably Zhang Chunfan's alter ego.
  - The novel states that he gets the affection of women wherever he travels because he is so gentle, and that, as paraphrased by David Wang, "so clever that he can play the expensive game of love at bargain prices." Catherine Vance Yeh, the author of Shanghai Love: Courtesans, Intellectuals, and Entertainment Culture, 1850-1910, wrote that Zhang Qiugu "is a man of letters who proves to be a "master among the flowers," with all the courtesan stars at his feet." Zhang Qiugu also displays filial piety. David Wang wrote that Zhang Qiugu, "a late Qing Casanova" with "impeccable bedroom skills" and an "insatiable sexual desire", is a "contrast" to Kang Jisheng and the story's "other dupes" who were "made "turtles" by their women." Yeh wrote that Zhang Qiugu was presented as a person who is "not only" "undefeated in Shanghai" but is also "able to handle the city with ease". Regarding his visiting of other prostitutes after marrying Chen Wenxian, David Wang states that Zhang Qiugu "betrays his vulnerability from time to time" despite being "supposedly immune from the problems that vex other men". Ultimately Zhang Qiugu is unable to become a civil servant. Since Zhang Qiugu is unable to fully win his boss' favor, David Wang wrote that Zhang Qiugu becomes "a Chen Wenxian in the official world" and that the character's outcome "in the public world is analogous to Chen Wenxian's in the private domain; both are talents ignored by their superiors."
  - In the 1930s Lu Xun derisively referred to Zhang Qiugu as a "talented young man plus rascal" (才子加流氓; cáizǐ jiā liúmáng; ts'ai-tzu chia liu-mang) who knows how to achieve unscrupulous objectives by using his worldly manners and social knowledge, and therefore is able to thrive during periods of change. Lu Xun added that Zhang Qiugu's character type was one of the few character types that illustrate a fleeting sentiment.
- Kang Jisheng (康己生; Kàng Jǐshēng; K'ang Chi-sheng) - A former governor of Jiangxi, Kang Jisheng is described by David Wang as "greedy and unscrupulous". His career is based on corruption and he buys official titles. Kang loses his job because his lifestyle is too blatantly opulent compared to the standards of late Qing officials, who were already corrupt. He travels to Shanghai, where he retires. There, he takes a third prostitute and allows her to have control over his household. The other eight female members of Kang Jisheng's family become as lewd as his third concubine. Therefore, within the novel he is derided because he has a lack of control over women in his household despite his wealth and political power. He received the nickname "nine-tailed Turtle" due to his lack of control.
- Wang Suqiu (王素秋; Wáng Sùqiū; Wang Su-ch'iu) - A prostitute who Kang Jisheng makes as his third concubine, Wang Suqiu deceives Kang Jisheng and then corrupts his household's remaining women.
- Chen Wenxian (陳文仙; 陈文仙; Chén Wénxiān; Ch'en Wen-hsien) - Chen Wenxian is a courtesan who is loyal to Zhang Qiugu. David Wang describes her as "a courtesan who is pretty, intelligent, and conscientious." Zhang Qiugu marries her after she passes several tests, but afterwards he begins visiting other concubines. Zhang Qiugu believes Chen Wenxian is the sole courtesan who he knows who has virtues. She is, in the words of Yeh, "portrayed as [a positive exception] among the courtesans of the day." The presence of Chen Wenxian brings harmony to Zhang Qiugu's family. In the novel Zhang becomes more active in finding prostitutes after happily marrying Chen Wenxian, and David Wang wrote that Chen Wenxian "is said to understand [Zhang Qiugu] so well that she responds to her husband's unfaithfulness with acquiescence."
- Sai Jinhua - A legendary prostitute who Zhang Qiugu has sexual intercourse with. Xin Xiufu lends her to Zhang Qiugu for one night. After the Sai Jinhua and Zhang Qiugu leave each other, Sai Jinhua does not reappear in the story.
  - Unlike other portrayals of Sai Jinhua in fiction, in The Nine-tailed Turtle she is portrayed as "past her prime". David Wang wrote that "The author shows us that for all her patriotic bearing, Sai Jinhua is no more and no less than a prostitute." He added that "Sai Jinhua's body in Nine-tailed Turtle has lost the magical power that permeates the world of A Flower."

== Reception ==
According to David Der-wei Wang, The Nine-tailed Turtle was one of the most popular works of fiction during the late Qing Dynasty period. Wang credits this to the "encyclopedic exposé of nasty tricks and sordid deals of the demimonde" and the "catchy title". Up to the 1920s a poll ranked the book as one of the most favorite books of university students. Wang argues that the usage of the Wu dialect in the novel's conversational scenes, "indicating [Zhang's] regional consciousness and linguistic alertness", was the novel's sole redeeming factor for "enlightened readers in the May Fourth era".

From the May Fourth era onwards, many scholars have criticized The Nine-tailed Turtle, accusing it of being a depraved novel. Hu Shih and Lu Xun accused it of being, as paraphrased by Wang, "a showcase of the bad taste and frivolity of late Qing literati writers". Hu Shih and Lu Xun said that the book became a bestseller due to the poor tastes of readers. According to Wang, by calling it a handbook or textbook for brothel-goers, Hu Shih and Lu Xun "ensured its lasting notoriety" and Wang also noted that in 1997 the work still had "an image problem".

David Wang argued that because the author had not ended the book at an appropriate time, the second half of The Nine-tailed Turtle is "a dreadfully boring work."

== See also ==
- Shanghai Flowers
