= The Future of New China =

1902 unfinished novel by Liang Qichao

- Author: Liang Qichao
- Language: Chinese
- Set in: 1962
- Publication date: 1902
- Publication place: China
- Media type: book

The Future of New China
- Traditional Chinese: 新中國未來記
- Simplified Chinese: 新中国未来记
- Literal meaning: Record of the Future of New China
Transcriptions
Standard Mandarin
- Hanyu Pinyin: xīn Zhōngguó wèilái jì
- Wade–Giles: hsin Chung-kuo wei-lai chi

The Future of New China (Chinese: 新中國未來記) is an unfinished 1902 novel by Liang Qichao. Liang described a China in 1962 that was a utopia, a world power, wealthy, Confucian, and a constitutional monarchy. He believed that it would be in a "perfect mood".

Author David Der-wei Wang described most of the novel as "an instructional political treatise where the virtues of various modes of government are lucidly debated."

== Plot ==
The novel is an example of early science fiction in China.

In the preface the author apologizes for what is paraphrased in "The Unfinished History of China's Future" by John Fitzgerald as a "rambling quality" due to the inability to put it in a particular genre due to its content, as it was not a historical account, nor was it an orthodox fictional story.

The novel begins at the ending and then continues at the beginning of the story; this is called the "flashback technique", a concept that was newly introduced in late Qing China. The novel begins in 1962, or year of Confucius 2513, and shows a 50th anniversary celebration of a Shanghai-based reform movement in which a World Expo and peace treaty signings occur. The celebrated reform movement was the Constitutional Party (xianzhengdang), an umbrella movement of secret society and pro-reform or revolution groups. By 1962 there were three political parties: the Patriotic Self-Government Party (Aiguo zizhidang), the Liberal Party (ziyoudang), and the State Power Party (guoquandang). These three are decentralist, individualist, and centralist, respectively. The "Hungarian Conference" resulted in the 1962 International Peace Conference, held in Shanghai in January of that year, in which China is recognized as the most dominant country on Earth. In the story people in foreign countries, including those in the West, study Chinese to get ahead, and foreign students in China remain in China after the conclusion of their studies, causing brain drain in the West.

In Chapter 2, Kong Hongdao (孔弘道; meaning "expander of the Dao"), style name Juemin (覺民; 觉民; meaning "enlightener of the people"), a 72nd generation descendant of Confucius, gives a lecture in which he discusses how a reformed China came to be, covering the period 1903–1962. The lectures are called "China's History These Sixty Years Past." The audience includes 1,000 students from various countries, with each one having total fluency in Chinese. Kong Hongdao had studied in the West before returning to China. Kong Hongdao describes the genesis of the Constitutional Party (Xianzheng dang), which guides China's reform. Kong Hongdao states that China underwent six stages before being reformed, but the novel describes only a portion of the first stage. Kong states that the stages are: preparation, autonomy of various districts, unification of all of China, building things and producing goods, competing with other countries, and finally becoming the global superpower. The historical overview is a small portion of Kong's lecture.

This section includes debates between the characters Huang Keqiang (黄克強) and Li Qubing (李去病), who discuss whether China should experience a revolution or be reformed. Huang Keqiang's father, an academic from Guangdong, sent him and Li Qubing to Oxford University; due to the Hundred Days Reform they do not immediately return to China, and they experience anti-Chinese sentiment from the Europeans. On their way back to China, Li Qubing argues the Qing dynasty government needs to be abolished, while Huang Keqiang argues it can be reformed. The debates, transcribed verbatim within Kong Hongdao's speech, make up the bulk of the speech. Huang Keqiang and Li Qubing established the Constitutional Party.

There is no more content after Chapter 5. David Wang stated that the absence of the middle portions of the storyline means that the novel does not have its "progressive narrative" or "the historical time to make the future accessible and intelligible."

== Development ==
Liang Qichao, who believed that China would later adopt a parliamentary democracy as its form of government, was influenced by the 1888 American novel Looking Backward and the 1886 Japanese novel Setchubai ("Plum Blossoms in the Snow"). As part of his research he visited Australia for six months. Liang Qichao considered making two sequels, with the second being The Future of Old China, and the third being New Peach Blossom Spring. The second would be about a China that decides not to adapt to a new era and therefore falls into ruin, while the third would be about the descendants of Chinese who had established a civilization on an island away from China; these people come back to China to improve it.

According to Chloë F. Starr, the author of Red-light Novels of the late Qing, the novel stopped publication due to a decline in the sale of serial magazines. David Wang stated in Fin-de-siècle Splendor: Repressed Modernities of Late Qing Fiction, 1849-1911 that Liang Qichao had changed his vision of how a new China would be established, and that this and several other factors resulted in a halt in the novel's development. David Wang concluded that the fact that the book was never completed was "symptomatic of Liang's inabilities to come to terms with a new temporal paradigm."

== Reception ==
David Wang compared this novel with Taiwan Straits: 1999 by Yao Chia-wen arguing that they both had nationalistic elements.

Several works had been inspired by this novel, including Xin Zhongguo, a 1910 novel by Lu Shi'e; and New Era, a 1908 novel by Bigehuan zhuren.
