= Flowers of Shanghai =

1998 film by Hou Hsiao-hsien

- DVD Cover
- Chinese: 海上花
- Literal meaning: Shanghai flower
- Hanyu Pinyin: Hǎishàng Huā
- Directed by: Hou Hsiao-hsien
- Screenplay by: Chu Tʽien-wen
- Story by: Han Bangqing; Eileen Chang
- Based on: The Sing-song Girls of Shanghai
- Produced by: Shozo Ichiyama; Yang Teng-kuei
- Starring: Tony Leung Chiu-Wai; Annie Shizuka Inoh; Michiko Hada; Michelle Reis; Shuan Fang; Jack Kao
- Cinematography: Pin Bing Lee
- Edited by: Liao Ching-sung
- Music by: Yoshihiro Hanno
- Production companies: 3-H Films; Shochiku
- Release dates: 20 May 1998 (Cannes); 1 October 1998 (Taiwan); 17 October 1998 (Japan)
- Running time: 113 minutes
- Countries: Taiwan; Japan
- Languages: Shanghainese; Cantonese

Flowers of Shanghai is a 1998 drama film directed by Hou Hsiao-hsien. It is based on the novel The Sing-song Girls of Shanghai (1892) by Han Bangqing, which was originally written in the Wu language (吳語) and translated into Mandarin Chinese by Eileen Chang.

The film stars Tony Leung as a wealthy patron and Michiko Hada, Annie Shizuka Inoh, Shuan Fang, Jack Kao, Carina Lau, Rebecca Pan, Michelle Reis and Vicky Wei as "flower girls" in four high-end Shanghai brothels. It was voted the third best film of the 1990s in the Village Voice Film Poll conducted in 1999.

The film had its world premiere at the main competition of the 1998 Cannes Film Festival, where it was nominated for the Palme d'Or. It was selected as the Taiwanese entry for the Best Foreign Language Film at the 71st Academy Awards, but it was not nominated.

== Plot ==
The film is set in the elegant brothels of Shanghai, called Changsan Shuyu (長三書寓; "Flower Houses"), in 1884. The story is about the prostitutes in these houses, known as "shi sen" or "flower girls," who are top-notch prostitutes, depicting in great detail their relationships with the wealthy patrons, which are semi-monogamous and often last for a long period of time, and the daily activities in the houses.

The main prostitutes in the film are Crimson, Jasmin, Jade, Pearl and Emerald. Crimson belongs to the Huifang Enclave (薈芳里), while Jasmin works at the East Hexing Enclave (東合興里). Jade and her friend Pearl work in the Gongyang Enclave (公陽里), and Emerald resides in the Shangren Enclave (尚仁里). The film explores the relationships between the wealthy patrons and the prostitutes.

Master Wang leaves the prostitute Crimson at the end of their "four-or-five" year relationship after he is refused her hand in marriage. He falls for the younger prostitute Jasmin, angering Crimson. However, Master Wang still has feelings for Crimson. When he finds out she is having an affair with an actor, he launches into a drunken rage. He agrees to marry Jasmin and departs for Guangdong after receiving a promotion. It is later revealed in conversation between other characters that Jasmin had an affair with Wang's nephew.

Another prostitute, Jade, has been given a promise by her lover, the young and immature Master Zhu, that if they cannot be married together, they will die together. When it is apparent that the marriage will not occur, she gives Zhu opium in an attempt to poison him before attempting to drink opium herself.

Emerald yearns for freedom from life in a brothel and is supported by Luo, one of her patrons. As a child, she was bought for $100 by her auntie who insists that freedom costs many times that value ($3,000); the negotiation goes on throughout the film. With the help of Master Hong and Luo, Emerald negotiates a satisfactory price and achieves her independence.

== Cast ==
Actor	Character	Notes
Tony Leung Chiu-wai	Master Wang (王蓮生)	
Michiko Hada	Crimson (沈小紅)	Dubbing by Pauline Chan
Michelle Reis	Emerald (黃翠鳳)	
Carina Lau	Pearl (周雙珠)	
Vicky Wei (魏筱惠)	Jasmin (張蕙貞)	
Hsuan Fang	Jade (周雙玉)	
Jack Kao	Master Luo (羅子富)	
Rebecca Pan	Huang (黃二姐)	
Simon Chang	Zhu Shuren (朱淑人)	
Luo Tsai-erh	Master Hong (洪善卿)	
Annie Shizuka Inoh	Golden Flower (諸金花)	
Hsu Ming	Master Tao (陶雲甫)	
Xu Tian-Xiang	Tao Yu Fu (陶玉甫)	
Hsu An-an		
Firebird Lu	Vagabond #2	
Cheung Shui Chit	Xiao Liuer (小柳兒)	
Che Hin		
Hsu Hui Ni	Crystal's younger sister	
Lin Yu-han	Treasure (周雙寶)	

== Production ==
According to the screenwriter Chu Tʽien-wen, Flowers of Shanghai was originated with Hou Hsiao-Hsien's intention to create a collection of art production resources for Taiwan cinema with the assistance of art director Hwarng Wern-ying (黃文英), as he did for sound recording with Tu Duu-Chi (杜篤之) .

Hou Hsiao-Hsien originally intended to shoot Flowers of Shanghai in China, but the application was not approved by the Chinese government. The production was forced to be completed in Taiwan, which is why the film has no outdoor scenes. Without proper locations that could be the background for the period, the film was all shot in the studio.

Hou Hsiao-hsien's long shots are used to their fullest potential in this film. The nearly two-hour film consists of fewer than forty shots. The long takes are edited by using fade-ins and fade-outs imitating the rhythm of breathing, which also allow the viewers to have enough time to fully appreciate the recreation of old Shanghai on screen.

Ah Cheng (Zhong Acheng, 鍾阿城) was responsible for sourcing and ordering most of the costumes and props for the film from China. He proposed to Hou that the film should not use electric bulbs but be lit with candles to give the room a warm and nostalgic atmosphere.

== Awards ==
Awards	Category	Recipient(s)	Result
1st Taipei Film Festival	Best Director	Hou Hsiao-hsien	Won
1st Taipei Film Festival	Taiwan Feature Film - Best Art Direction	Hwarng Wern-ying	Won
35th The Golden Horse Awards	Best Feature Film	Flowers of Shanghai	Nominated
35th The Golden Horse Awards	Best Director	Hou Hsiao-hsien	Nominated
35th The Golden Horse Awards	Best Art Direction	Hwarng Wern-ying Tsao Chih Wei	Won
35th The Golden Horse Awards	Best Makeup & Costume Design	Hwarng Wern-ying, Sung Min Hui, Chen Pu Hai, Liao Su Jen	Nominated
35th The Golden Horse Awards	Jury Prize	Flowers of Shanghai	Won
The 51st Cannes Film Festival	The Palme d'Or	Flowers of Shanghai	Nominated

The film won for Best Director and Best Art Director (Wen-Ying Huang) at the Asia-Pacific Film Festival in 1998, and the next year the director won the Golden Crow Pheasant at the International Film Festival of Kerala. It was nominated for the Golden Palm at Cannes but did not win.

== Critical reception ==
On review aggregator Rotten Tomatoes, the film has an approval rating of 93% based on 14 reviews. On Metacritic, the film has an average weighted score of 73 out of 100 based on 11 critics, indicating "generally favorable reviews".

Film critic J. Hoberman, like Jonathan Rosenbaum, called Hou Hsiao-hsien the best director of the '90s, and hailed Flowers of Shanghai as one of Hou's three masterpieces from that decade.

Jeffrey Anderson finds the film incredibly beautiful, despite the need for "multiple viewings and incredible patience."

While Jeremy Heilman did not want to call it Hou's best film, he considered it his prettiest. Kent Jones called the film innovative.

== See also ==
- Sing-song girls
- List of submissions to the 71st Academy Awards for Best Foreign Language Film
- List of Taiwanese submissions for the Academy Award for Best Foreign Language Film
