= Irene Eber =

Israeli Orientalist

Irene Eber (Hebrew: איירין אבר; 1929 in Halle – April 2019; née Geminder) was an Israeli sinologist. She was the Louis Frieberg Professor of East Asian Studies (emeritus) at the Hebrew University of Jerusalem (sinologist), and Senior Fellow of the Harry S. Truman Research Institute. She lived in Jerusalem. A specialist on the Bible in China, working sometimes with Jost Zetzsche, Marián Gálik, and Nicolas Standaert. She was also a specialist in translations from Chinese.

== Works ==
- Chinese and Jews: Encounters Between Cultures. Vallentine Mitchell & Co Ltd. 2007
- Chinese Tales. Introd. By Martin Buber, Transl. Alex Page. Humanity Books. 1998. ISBN 1-57392-612-4
- The Jewish Bishop and the Chinese Bible: S.I.J. Schereschewsky (1831–1906). Brill Academic Pub. 1999. 304 p. ISBN 90-04-11266-9
- Bible in Modern China. The Literary and Intellectual Impact. Steyler Verlagsbuchhandlung, 1999. With Nicolas Standaert, Arnulf Camps, and Jost Zetzsche.
- Confucianism, the Dynamics of Tradition. Macmillan Library Reference. 1986
- Influence, Translation and Parallels. Selected Studies on the Bible in China. With Marián Gálik. Steyler Verlagsbuchhandlung. 330 Seiten. ISBN 3-8050-0489-3
- The Choice - Poland, 1939-1945. 2004. Schocken Books Inc., New York. Penguin Putnam Inc., US. 240 p. ISBN 0-8052-4197-3 (A Holocaust survivor's story describes her experiences in wartime Mielec. Eber's book is a psychological analysis of coping with the destructive forces that engulfed her young life at Halle, Mielec, Brünnlitz (Brněnec), Kraków, Prague, Regensburg, Cham, Munich, Frankfurt am Main and Zeilsheim.)
- Above the Drowning Sea, documentary on the Shanghai Jews, featured witness. 2017
