= New Era (novel) =

1908 novel by Bigehuan Zhuren

- Traditional Chinese: 新紀元
- Simplified Chinese: 新纪元
Transcriptions
Standard Mandarin
- Hanyu Pinyin: Xīn Jìyuán
- Wade–Giles: Hsin chi-yüan

New Era (Chinese: 新紀元) is a 1908 novel by Bigehuan Zhuren (碧荷館主人).

The novel, set in 1999, focuses on a world war between China and The West, in which China becomes the world superpower and a "yellow peril" (黃禍 huánghuò) with one trillion residents. The country had political free speech, an active science and technology industry, and a parliamentary political system operating nationally and sub-nationally. It also had control of all former Chinese concessions as well as Mongolia, Taiwan, Tibet, and Xinjiang; the former were given to China circa 1939.

The novel was inspired by Xin Zhongguo weilai ji. David Wang wrote that it was "more polemical" than another work inspired by Xin Zhongguo weilai ji, the 1910 novel Xin Zhongguo. David Wang added that due to the Century of humiliation in which Europeans subjugated Chinese, to the readers the ending "must have been exhilarating".

The novel has supernatural and scientific elements. David Wang stated that the novel is more similar to Quell the Bandits than Xue Rengui zhengdong ("The Eastern Expedition of Xue Rengui") since New Era uses highly intelligent scientists in the way Quell the Bandits uses supernatural characters. David Wang argued that for readers at the time the future setting was "the ultimate machina" in which China's geopolitical standing and power have drastically changed, although some elements seem anachronistic to a reader in the decade of the 2000s.

== Plot ==
David Wang stated that "In its epic scale the novel is a maritime version of the Mongol conquest of Europe."

The novel's beginning highlights this new China and also discusses a civil war between majority ethnic Mongoloids and Caucasoids, supported by adjacent white European powers, in Hungary; they are deciding whether to support a white European calendar or a Chinese calendar; each one would orient Hungary towards a different society. David Der-wei Wang stated that "it is no coincidence" that Biheguan zhuren used Hungary, which had once been invaded by Huns, as the setting of a clash of civilizations.

The novel's story further develops with actions taken by ethnic Chinese elsewhere, including the establishment of the Western Chinese Republic in the Western United States by Chinese immigrants, the involvement of an undersea ethnic Chinese country near Borneo, a revolt of ethnic Chinese in Australia, and the seizure of the Panama Canal by Chinese. In addition Egypt and Turkey block several Central and Eastern European countries from assisting Western Europe. The United States government allies with Western Europe due to the loss of the Panama Canal. A former Chinese navy general, Huang Zhisheng, who had retired after his proposed reform plans had been rejected by government officials, is called back into service to be the leader of the Chinese sea forces. The Chinese win after having battles in the South China Sea, the Indian Ocean, the Red Sea, and the Adriatic Sea. In a last attempt to stop the Chinese, the Europeans use a poisonous green gas (綠氣 lǜqì). In response Huang Zhisheng goes to 90-year old Liu Shengzu to get a special liquid that converts ocean water to combustible gases; an Italian man had tutored Liu Shengzu; he, who Huang Zhisheng had served under, used his scientific smarts to create that chemical. Huang Zhisheng destroys a European navy by using divers to spread the liquid, then firing electrical beams (liti dianli deng) from a balloon to have the liquid ignited. David Wang compared this ending to that of the battle at Red Cliff of Romance of the Three Kingdoms.
