= Liu E =

Liu E may refer to:

- Liu E (Han-Zhao) (died 314), Liu Cong's empress
- Empress Liu (Zhenzong) (969–1033), Emperor Zhenzong of Song's empress, usually called Liu E in legends
- Liu E (writer) (1857–1909), Chinese antiquarian, novelist and minor government official
