= Guowen Bao =

Former Chinese newspaper in Tianjin

The Guowen Bao (simplified Chinese: 国闻报; traditional Chinese: 國聞報; pinyin: Guówén Bào; Wade–Giles: Kuo-wen Pao) was a late 1800s newspaper based in Tianjin. The editors were Yan Fu (a.k.a. Yen Fu) and Xia Zengyou. It had backing from the Government of Japan and was owned by a Japanese individual. In the late 1800s the newspaper promoted the idea of China and Japan cooperating against white European countries.

The front page of the November 10, 1897 issue is used as the front cover of the book The Chinese Novel at the Turn of the Century. In that issue, editors Yan Fu and Xia Zhengyou posted an announcement that the newspaper's literary supplement was beginning.
