= Bizarre Happenings Eyewitnessed over Two Decades =

Cover of Bizarre Happenings Eyewitnessed over Two Decades in a 1924 edition printed in Shanghai, collection of the Jilin University

Bizarre Happenings Eyewitnessed over Two Decades (T: 二十年目睹之怪現狀, S: 二十年目睹之怪现状, P: Èrshí Nián Mùdǔzhī Guài Xiànzhuàng, W: Erh-shih nien mu-tu-chih kuai hsien-chuang, also translated as: "Strange Events Witnessed in the Past Twenty Years", "The Strange State of the World Witnessed Over 20 Years", "Reports on Strange Things for the Past Twenty Years", and "Wu Jianren's Strange Events Eyewitnessed over the Last Two Decades") is a novel by Wu Jianren (also known as Wu Wo-yao). The novel was serialized in Xin Xiaoshuo (T: 新小說, S: 新小说, P: Xīn Xiǎoshuō; W: Hsin Hsiao-shuo; "New Fiction"), a magazine by Liang Qichao. In 1909 the novel was completed and published in book form.

The essay "Typology of Plot Structures in Late Qing Novels" by Milena Doleželová-Velingerová, published in the book The Chinese Novel at the Turn of the Century, discusses the novel's plot structure. The novel is known for its use of anecdotes.

The Chinese University Press published an abridged English translation by Shih Shun Liu, titled "Bizarre Happenings Eyewitnessed over Two Decades", in 1975.
