= Sing-song girls =

English term for high-class prostitutes in 19th-century China

Sing-song girls and flower girls are English-language terms for the high-class prostitutes in China during the 19th century.

== Origin ==
In ancient China, concubinage was legal. In Chinese custom, men carry the family name and the family's heritage after marriage. To ensure male heirs were produced, it was a common practice for an upper-class married man to have one or more concubines, provided he could support them. The custom could be invoked without the wife's consent: the husband's actions were protected by law. Concubines would co-exist in the family along with wives and children. A man might choose a courtesan or Gējì to be his concubine. Many of these courtesans would sing songs to attract potential husbands, hoping to become secondary wives. In the late Qing Dynasty, Geji culture declined and began to be replaced by high-class prostitutes.

== Terminology ==
Western observers in China during the 19th century witnessed these women singing but had no idea what to call them. Thus the term "sing-song girls" came about.

According to Han Bangqing's Sing-Song Girls of Shanghai, residents of Shanghai used the name 先生 to denote prostitutes who worked in changsan (brothels). The name is pronounced xiansheng in Mandarin and xisang in the Wu language. The word itself is actually a polite term akin to "sir" or "master", normally applied to a man. Some British and Americans in Shanghai, however, misheard the word and pronounced it sing-song.

== Classes ==
Among sing-song girls were actually several subclasses of high-end prostitutes divided by the quality of skill. Over time, these would evolve, beginning with one class, developing into four, and consolidating down to two. It was not until the founding of New China that the profession of prostitutes was abolished.

- Shuyu – The 書寓 (shuyu) were the highest class. These were skilled in cultured entertainments. Additionally, these were picked for beauty, trained in sophisticated conversation, and known for their extravagant dress. The shuyu would eventually become assimilated into the Changsan class of prostitutes. During the end of the Qing Dynasty and the beginning of the Republic of China, traditional shuyu existed in name only.
- Changsan – The 長三 (changsan, "long three") were the highest class of prostitutes in later stage. The term originally came from them charging three yuan for company and three more to spend the night. They maintained the class and artistry akin to the shuyu, while still being distinctly part of the sex trade. The relations between them and patrons were neither permanent nor monogamous.
- Yao'er – The 幺二 (yao'er, "one two") was the lower tier equivalent of the changsan. They were named this way because they traditionally charged one yuan for entertainment and two for sex. Originally, there was an intermediary class called the 二三 (ersan, "two three"). Over time, these were considered the same class as the changsan. While yao'er prostitutes were lower tier than changsan, they still focused on entertainment as well as sexual services. However, they charged less than the changsan, and accordingly provided lesser services.

During the Republic of China, in addition to directly-operated brothels, there were also home-based brothels. Laobao (老鸨, lit. 'old bustard', because the Shennong Bencaojing claims that female bustards mate with every species of bird) and pimps bought young girls and started teaching them basic talents from eleven or twelve years old. At thirteen or fourteen, they ended training and started singing on stage. At fifteen or sixteen, the laobaos (老鸨) and pimps gave them large numbers of obscene books to read, and they began to work as prostitutes. This is different from the traditional Gejis in ancient China, but during the Republic of China, many brothels would call these girls Gejis at will.

The main business of prostitutes is prostitution, and they also earn extra income by chatting and drinking with clients; they may also accompany guests to drink tea and chat, which is called "Da Cha Wei (打茶围)". They participate in the service of drinking with customers, called "Chu Ju (出局)". Regardless of whether they are Chang San or Yao Er, they all have a unified title, "guan ren (倌人)", which refers to prostitutes who are officially listed for business. The first relationship with a high-class prostitute requires a period of time and a lot of money, but the relationship does not last long and is not "monogamous". Some high-end prostitutes will also have a stable of clients, but will continue to engage in prostitution, and her client can also go to whoring with other high-end prostitutes. If a client of a high-end prostitute wants to develop a long-term relationship with her, the client can also spend more money through the madam or laobao (老鸨) to maintain a "monogamous" relationship with the prostitute until the relationship ends. Underage prostitutes in Guangdong are called Pipa Zai (琵琶仔). They start working after they become "adults" and are then called Lao Ju (老举). After their first client buys their virginity, they can stay for 10 days; after that, the client must leave and the prostitute officially begins her career.

== Classes of other prostitutes ==
Below these, fell those whose services were purely sexual. The women serving in the lowest tiers of the sex trade were often there as a result of being sold, mortgaged, kidnapped, or otherwise forced into the industry. (These do not address the women in other industries, such as masseuses and taxi dancers, who part-time sold sexual services.)

- "Salt pork" – These prostitutes were housed in brothels which focused entirely on selling sexual services. These houses were colloquially named "salt pork shops" for the similarities between the selling of these women's bodies and of the division and selling of salt pork. Unlike the sing-song girls, these women had almost no say regarding their lives and services, as rather than performing, they were simply having their bodies rented.
- "Pheasants" – The next class of prostitutes were streetwalkers. Being in the streets, they had little protection from law enforcement and thugs, leaving them doubly at risk of arrest or assault. An example of this can be found in the 1934 silent film The Goddess (神女). That said, a majority of "pheasants" did belong to brothels and would bring their customers back to service them. They were called "pheasants" for their gaudy dress and habit of scouring the streets for customers.
- "Flowers" – Coming from the term "flower-smoke rooms", this and the following were the lowest class of prostitutes. Flower smoke rooms were opium dens where customers could have prostitutes while smoking opium. This class of prostitutes disappeared before the Cultural Revolution Reforms with the ban of opium.
- "Nailsheds" – These brothels were targeted towards low class laborers such as rickshaw pullers.

== Abolition of prostitution ==
There was a period of time in the Republic of China when prostitution was banned. This ban was implemented from the autumn of 1928 until 1937, but the number of prostitutes was still huge. When there is no ban on prostitution, prostitutes in Nanjing need to obtain a license from the government department and wear a badge with "prostitute" written on it, also called a "peach blossom badge", which indicates that they are legal prostitutes and must wear this badge at all times.

For prostitutes without these badges, the government will punish them and impose fines if they are caught, because these private prostitutes do not pay taxes, while registered prostitutes do. Those prostitutes who were required to wear badges protested against this, feeling that being a prostitute was no longer honorable, and it was too shameful to have to wear badges to identify themselves as prostitutes. There are also a few singing girls in Nanjing who do not engage in prostitution and make a living by singing, they sang on stage in teahouses and restaurants. At that time, singing girls could easily be regarded as "disguised prostitutes".

During the Republic of China, the Nanjing Municipal Government strictly controlled singing girls, and singing girls were also required to wear "peach blossom badges". While Nanjing banned prostitute, it also imposed requirements on singing girls. The Nanjing Municipal Government issued silver peach blossom-shaped badges for them. It is stipulated that singing girls must wear a silver badge for identification when singing on stage. The singing girls knew that the peach blossom badge was set by the government for prostitutes, so she refused to wear it. The Nanjing government stated that singing girls also wear badges to avoid confusion with prostitutes. This badge logo has no real effect. After leaving the profession of prostitutes, many prostitutes continue to engage in prostitution as singing girls in Nanjing. Some prostitutes' laobaos (老鸨) directly registered the prostitutes as singing girls, them to engage in prostitution as singing girls.

After the ban on prostitution, more and more "singing girls" appeared. These singing girls were prostitutes registered as singing girls and prostituted themselves in Nanjing. At that time, there was even a boatload of "singing girls" wearing silver badges who went to the hotel to engage in prostitution secretly. Some brothels directly renamed teahouses and continued to engage in prostitution. Subsequently, the ban on prostitution and the peach blossom seal on prostitutes and singing girls were gradually cancelled.

== Historical use of the term ==
- During the 1930s, Li Jinhui started the Chinese popular music industry with a number of musical troupes. The groups were mostly young women performing and singing. The term Sing-Song-Girls stuck, since the Chinese Communist Party associated pop music with Yellow Music or pornography in the 1940s.

== Related impact ==
Even the highest class Changsan could not escape the ignominy of the sex trade. Traditional views held that once married, a woman had no need to impress anyone. In conjunction with Confucian ideals of the virtues of modesty, this led to a standard of dress aimed to hide the form of the body within. However, sing-song girls were unburdened by such virtues. An example of this can be seen in the cheongsam, which not only became more form fitting, but also became sleeveless with a long slit running up each side.

They often decorated their parlors with expensive decor and modern amenities, making them culturally progressive to the point where there are documented cases of women sneaking into the entertainment houses to catch a glimpse of what the latest decorations and fashions were.

Some prostitutes began to use portraits of themselves as a way to attract business, early business cards.

== Related issues ==
After the Chinese Communist Party seized power in 1949, it gradually carried out earth-shaking transformation of Chinese society, including the abolition of the prostitution system that had existed for thousands of years in a relatively short period of time. Hundreds of thousands of prostitutes and related industry personnel such as brothel owners, etc. across the country have been dealt with in various ways. Prostitutes receive human rights assistance and medical attention, and brothel owners face legal penalties.

During the Republic of China, there were a huge number of prostitutes in China. Prostitutes in old China generally suffered from sexually transmitted diseases. Among the prostitutes in Beijing, 96.6% of them suffered from syphilis, gonorrhea, and fourth sexually transmitted diseases. In Shanghai, 89.9% of the first batch of prostitutes admitted had sexually transmitted diseases. Of the more than 5,000 prostitutes admitted from 1951 to 1957, 2,267 of them, accounting for 41.98%, were found to have syphilis. In Beijing, Shanghai and Nanjing, large sums of money were allocated to purchase penicillin, which could not be produced in China at the time, to treat sexually transmitted diseases for prostitutes. Beijing earmarked 100 million yuan (old currency) for this purpose. After the founding of the People's Republic of China, prostitutes could be taken home by their families, get married, or have jobs arranged by the government.

== Sing-song girls in fiction ==
- Sing-song girls were popularized in Han Bangqing's 1892 novel Sing-Song Girls of Shanghai (later adapted into the 1998 film Flowers of Shanghai).
- Sing-song girls play a minor role in Isabel Allende's Daughter of Fortune (Hija de la fortuna). Tao Chi'en dedicates his work to healing sick girls – although most end up dying – because it is when they are sick that he can sneak them out of the house under the pretext of conducting "experiments". He tries to help those girls who manage to recover to improve their lives so that they no longer need to prostitute themselves. Allende also mentions sing-song girls in her book Portrait in Sepia (Retrato en Sepia).
- Amitav Ghosh's novel River of Smoke, set in southern Chinese port cities, refers to prostitutes in Canton as "sing-song girls".
