= Zeng Pu =

Chinese novelist

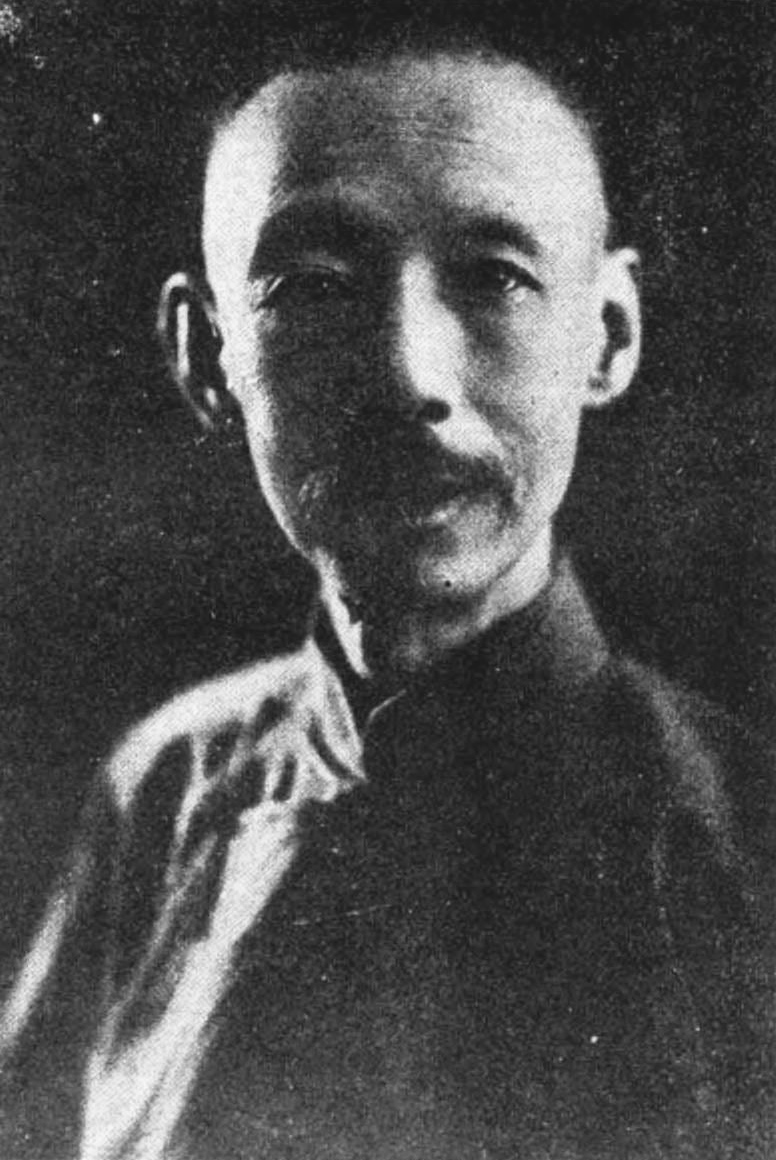
Zeng Pu, c. 1928

Zeng Pu (simplified Chinese: 曾朴; traditional Chinese: 曾樸; pinyin: Zēng Pǔ; Wade–Giles: Tseng P'u; 1872–1935) was a Chinese novelist.

Zeng Pu published a scholarly work on the later Han dynasty in 1895. He later enrolled in the College of Foreign Languages in Beijing to learn the French language. Zeng Pu returned to Jiangsu in 1898 and built a school. In 1903 he began a business in Shanghai, which failed. He returned to his focus in literature. Zeng Pu was a Francophile.

== Writing style ==
The language in Zeng Pu's novels borrowed allusions and images from classical Chinese literature and Zeng Pu used symbolism in his novels. Therefore, his works appealed to readers who had a classical education and were considered sophisticated in their society.

Zeng Pu knew the French language. David Der-wei Wang, author of Fin-de-siècle Splendor: Repressed Modernities of Late Qing Fiction, 1849-1911, wrote that Zeng Pu was "probably" the sole late Qing novelist who knew a foreign language. David Wang explained that since Zeng Pu knew French he had "direct access to European literature without the mediation of distorted translations."

The First Sino-Japanese War had a large effect on Zeng Pu.

== Works ==
Jin Tianhe (Jin Songcen) started A Flower in a Sinful Sea as a political novel criticizing Russian advances into China. Zeng Pu, writing under the pseudonym "Sick man of Asia", took control of the novel in 1904. He completed it as a historical novel.
