= Ping-hui Liao =

Ping-hui Liao (Traditional Chinese: 廖炳惠) is Chuan-liu Chair Professor in Taiwan Studies at the Department of Literature of the University of California, San Diego (UCSD). He is also a Chair professor at National Taiwan Normal University. Prior to taking the chair professor position at UCSD, he was a distinguished professor at National Tsing Hua University and also Director General of the National Science Council Department of Humanities and Social Sciences. He was also a visiting professor at Columbia University during the 2001–02 academic year and before that a visiting scholar at the Harvard-Yenching Institute in 1996-97 and Princeton University in 1991–92. He graduated from Tunghai University in 1976. He received his Ph.D. at the University of California, San Diego, in 1987.

Liao works primarily in the fields of comparative literature, postcolonial theory, and cultural studies. He is also interested in the study of opera, sister arts, and visual culture. He has written many books, including At the Crossroad of Taiwan and World Literature, published in 2006, and Ways of Eating: Savoring Postmodernity, published in 2004. He has also edited Taiwan Under Japanese Colonial Rule, 1895-1945: History, Culture, Memory with David Der-wei Wang. Published by Columbia University Press in 2006, the volume was one of the first English studies of colonial Taiwan. In 2007, Liao and Wang organized a conference at Yale named Taiwan and its Contexts. The two intend to publish a volume documenting its findings. Liao also serves on the editorial collective of Public Culture.
