= Leo Ou-fan Lee =

Taiwanese commentator and author (born 1939)

- 李歐梵
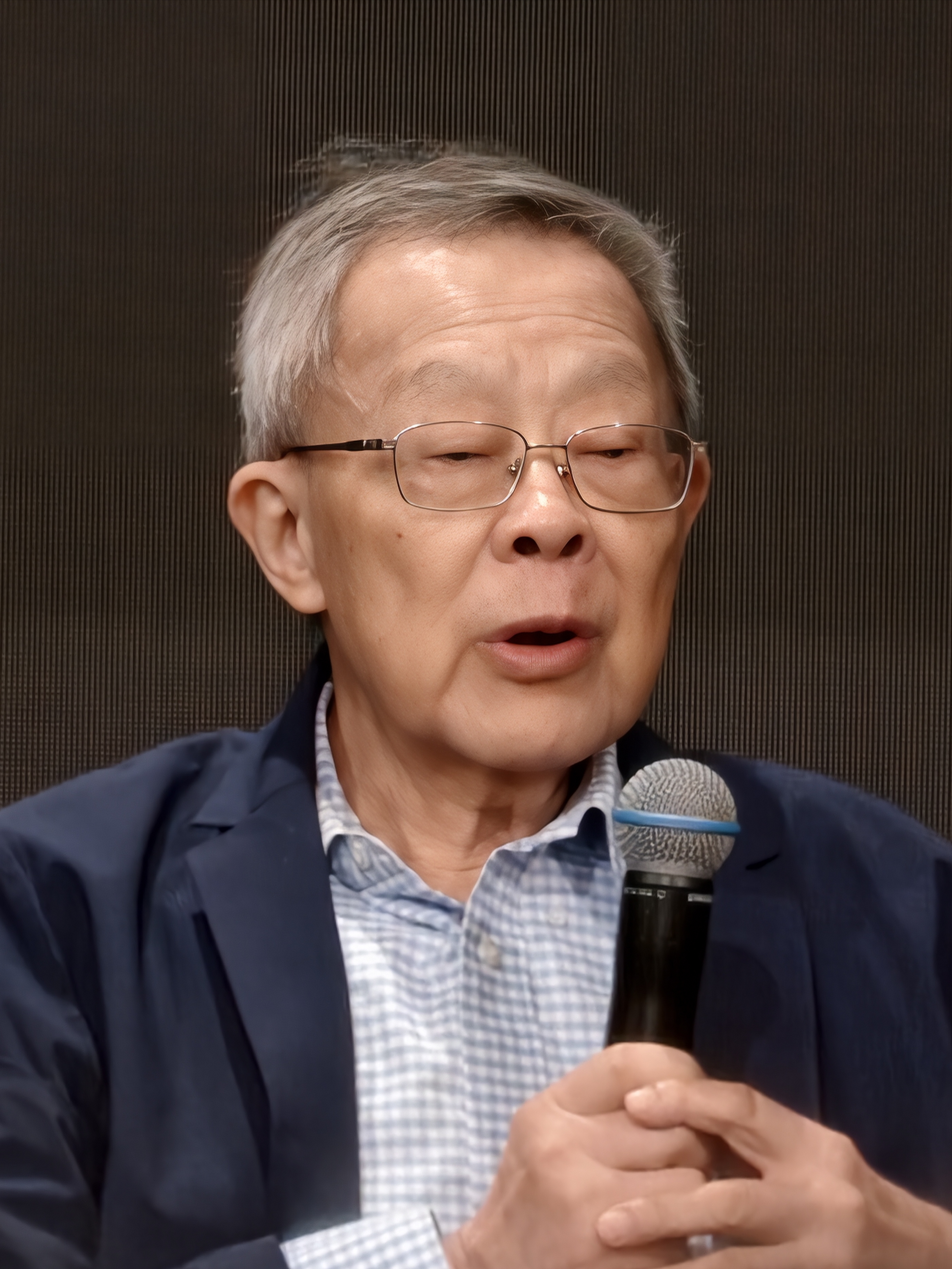
- Born: April 9, 1939 (age 87); Taikang County, Henan, China
- Education: National Taiwan University (BA); University of Chicago (MA); Harvard University (PhD)
- Occupations: Commentator, author, professor, literary scholar
- Spouse(s): Wang Xiaolan (former, 1987-1998); Li Yuying (2002-)
- Relatives: Father: Li Yonggang; Mother: Zhou Yuan
- Writing career
- Language: Chinese, English
- Period: 1970–present
- Genre: Essay
- Notable works: Shanghai Modern: The Flowering of a New Urban Culture in China, 1930–1945
- Notable awards: Guggenheim Fellowship 1985

Leo Ou-fan Lee
- Traditional Chinese: 李歐梵
- Simplified Chinese: 李欧梵
Transcriptions
Standard Mandarin
- Hanyu Pinyin: Lǐ Ōufán
- Wade–Giles: Li3 Ou1-fan2

Leo Ou-fan Lee (Chinese: 李歐梵; born 09 April 1939) is a Taiwanese commentator and author who was elected Fellow of Academia Sinica in 2002. Lee also was a professor at Chinese University of Hong Kong, Princeton University, Indiana University, University of Chicago, University of California, Los Angeles, Harvard University, and National Taiwan Normal University.

Lee has served as columnist of several publications, such as the Yazhou Zhoukan, Hong Kong Economic Journal, Ming Pao, and Muse.

== Biography ==
Lee was born in a wealthy and highly educated family in Taikang County, Henan in 1942. Both his father Li Yonggang (Chinese: 李永刚) and mother Zhou Yuan (Chinese: 周瑗) were musicians and educators. His given name "Ou-fan" is the Chinese version of Orpheus, the Greek god of music.

Lee graduated from National Hsinchu Senior High School and National Taiwan University. He first took a master's degree from University of Chicago, where he was inspired by T.H. Tsien to study Chinese literature. He then went on to study at Harvard University, where his mentors included Benjamin I. Schwartz and John King Fairbank. He received his Ph.D. degree from Harvard University in 1970, majoring in history and East Asian languages. His doctoral dissertation was titled, "The romantic generation: a study of modern Chinese men of letters".

After graduating he taught at Chung Chi College of Chinese University of Hong Kong, Princeton University, Indiana University, University of Chicago, University of California, Los Angeles, Harvard University, and National Taiwan Normal University.

In 2002, Lee was elected Fellow of Academia Sinica.

== Personal life ==
Lee was first wed to dancer Wang Xiaolan (Chinese: 王晓蓝), the daughter of Hualing Nieh Engle and poet Paul Engle. After a turbulent divorce, he remarried in September 2000. Li Yuying (Chinese: 李玉莹), his second wife, who was the former wife of Deng Wenzheng (Chinese: 邓文正). The couple was divorced, and Lee has since remarried.

== Selected works ==
=== Books and edited volumes ===
- My Harvard University Years
- The Romantic Generation of Modern Chinese Writers Cambridge, Mass. : Harvard University Press, 1973. ISBN 0674779304
- Voices from the Iron House: A Study of Lu Xun Bloomington: Indiana University Press, 1987. ISBN 0253362636
- Shanghai Modern: The Flowering of a New Urban Culture in China, 1930–1945 1999, Harvard University Press, ISBN 978-0-674-80551-4
- City Between Worlds: My Hong Kong. Cambridge, Mass. : Harvard University Press. 2008 ISBN 978-0-674-02701-5
- An Intellectual History of Modern China, Merle Goldman and Leo Ou-fan Lee, Ed, Cambridge: Cambridge University Press 2002. ISBN 0521801206
- Land Without Ghosts: Chinese Impressions of America From the Mid-Nineteenth Century to the Present. translated and edited by R. David Arkush and Leo O. Lee. Berkeley : University of California Press,1989. ISBN 978-0-520-06256-6
- The Lyrical and the Epic: Studies of Modern Chinese Literature, Author: Jaroslav Průšek; edited by Leo Ou-fan Lee. Bloomington, Ind. : Indiana University Press, 1980. ISBN 0253102839
- The Appropriation of Cultural Capital: China's May Fourth Project Milena Doleželová-Velingerová, Oldrich Kral, and Graham Sanders Ed, Harvard University Asia Center, 2002. ISBN 978-0674007864
- Musings: Reading Hong Kong, China and the World, Leo Lee Ou-fan, Muse Books/East Slope Publishing : Hong Kong, 2011. ISBN 978-988-15005-0-2

=== Essays, articles, and chapters ===
- ——— (2017), "Tribute To Jaroslav PruŠek (1906–1980): Unpacking Prùsek'sConception Of The "Lyrical": A Tribute And Some Intercultural Reflections" (PDF), AUC Philologica, 4: 151–166, doi:10.14712/24646830.2017.46
