= Stones in the Sea =

1906 novel by Fu Lin

Stones in the Sea (Chinese: Qin hai shi) is a 1906 Chinese novel by an anonymous author, written under the pseudonym Fu Lin. The novel is set in turn of the century China, during the period of the Boxer rebellion. The story is told by an adolescent male narrator, through the lens of his criticism against the familial ethics of the Chinese philosopher Mencius, about his own life and his infatuation with a young girl, in the wider context of the conflict between the Traditional Chinese marriage and their own freedoms to choose a partner.

The novel's first English translation had been done by the academic Patrick Hanan, paired with the novel The Sea of Regret, published by the University of Hawai'i Press in 1995. Hanan wrote in the preface of the pair of novels, that "ideally they should be read together", because "The Sea of Regret in particular cannot be appreciated fully without knowledge of Stones in the sea"

== Background ==
The novel is arguably one of the first 'modern' novels in Chinese literature. It captures the social climate of the turn-of-the-century 1899-1900's Imperial China chronicling the impact of the Opium trade, Imperial examination, rising technology, presence of foreign goods like silk and the presence of foreign traders, political forces and the Boxer Rebellion. Even though the Sea of Regret had been written as a response to Stones in the Sea, it was more popular than the latter, since Stones in the Sea had been published by a little known firm in May 1906.

=== Social debates ===
The central debate in the novel is between confucian values and Chinese institutions imbuing those values, ranging from the imperial examination to the traditional Chinese marriage. The novel was written in a time of increasing intellectual modernisation and rejection of traditionalism, a few years after the Boxer Rebellion, and the First Sino-Japanese War.

== Characters ==
- Qin Ruhua: Often referred to as Master Qin, he is the first person narrator and protagonist of the novel, who seeks to marry Aren, his childhood sweetheart, forming the central conflict of the novel. He met Aren, at the age of 10 in private school in which he found himself adoring her as their friendship grew. Separated at 12, he fell into a depression of which was further emphasized by his mother's death at 13. Meeting with Aren once again in Shanghai, their love began to rapidly grow. Ruhua tackles with the challenges of having a relationship at the time as the culture forbid any such relationships from forming. The main theme of arranged marriage is a looming threat over the course of the novel, with his desire for a life with Aren driving most of his actions. After Ruhua is eventually successful in his quest to have an arranged marriage with Aren, the Boxer Uprising happens which has them separated once again. The tragedy of his story is revealed as once he finds Aren she is on the brink of death. After witnessing her death he then falls fatally ill with a broken heart.
- Gu Aren: Often referred to as Aren, she was introduced as a classmate in Ruhua's private school class. She and Ruhua quickly became close friends. She was abruptly taken out of her class at the age of 12 and moved with her family to Wuchang. After meeting with Ruhua again, her relationship with Ruhua seems to grow over time. Her family stays in the capital as the Boxer Uprising begins and Ruhua moves away. After which she is sold into prostitution and left on the brink of death for Ruhua to find.
- Gu Asou: Aren's sister, at first she proves to be an obstacle to Ruhua and Aren's relationship as she has the ability to blackmail them due to her knowledge of their relationship. It is revealed that Asou herself is in a secret relationship with Lu Boyin in a letter Ruhua obtains and is no longer a threat to their relationship. Eventually gets engaged her lover at the end of the novel.
- Lu Boyin: Son of Lu Xiaocang, Asou's lover. Lu Boyin helps Ruhua try to convince his father to marry him with Aren by bringing him in contact with Guan Geru, who will take pay in return for attempting to convince Qin Yuan of the marriage. Was able to secure a coffin for the Gu family during the chaos of the Boxer Uprising and as such was able to get engaged to Asou.
- Qin Yuan: Ruhua's father, as a child he traveled with his father to Hubei where, after his father's death, he opened a silk shop with his savings. To sustain his family's long history of education and mobility, he often went to Hangzhou to take the imperial examination which he would pass at age 40. He served as one of the arbiters in the marriage between Ruhua and Aren, refusing the marriage until he sees Ruhua's illness brought about be their separation. After agreeing he swiftly moves his family due to the Boxer Uprising where he tries to stop his son's sorrows and considers to marry his son to Miss Bi.
- Gu Qingbo: Aren's father, often referred to as Uncle Gu. Acts as one of the main adversaries in the formation of Ruhua and Aren's relationship. While unaware, he constantly finds himself acting as a barrier between the two lovers, preventing them from meeting on multiple occasions. Eventually agrees to the arranged marriage between Ruhua and Aren, but sees them split as the Boxer Uprising happens by keeping his family in place and the Qin family moves. He soon dies after foreign troops enter the city.
- Mrs. Gu: Aren's mother, is eventually fond of Ruhua and consistently is kind to him, providing hospitality with tea. Eventually she makes a romantic move on Ruhua which is swiftly interrupted by Gu Qingbo. The unwanted advances causes another layer to the conflict because Ruhua can't speak out in fear of her exposing his relationship with Aren. She stays with Aren until her death in the hostel and convinces the Qin family to pay for Aren's grave and coffin.
- Qin Ruyu: Ruhua's older brother, at the age of 14 he enrolled in school in Hangzhou.
- Mrs Li: Ruhua's mother, from a gentry family with the name of Li. Had two children with Qin Yuan, Ruyu and Ruhua. Died of Cholera when Ruhua was 13.
- Wang Sheng: Qin family steward, serves as the main messenger for Ruhua to outside parties and provides aid when asked.
- Li Gui: Uncle Gu's Steward, is the one to reveal to Ruhua what had happened to Aren over the course of their separation due to the Boxer Uprising. Leads Ruhua to where Aren resides.
- Lu Xiaocang: Father or Lu Boyin and acquaintance to Qin Yuan. Works in the Ministry of Punishments.
- Guan Geru: meets with Lu Xiaocang, tries to convince Qin Yuan of Ruhua's marriage with Aren. Helps Aren and her mother flee the conflict to Tianjin after which he takes them to Shanghai.
- Jin Lizhi: Qin Yuan's childhood friend, visits Qin Yuan after their move to Hankou with a proposal to marry Ruhua with a Miss Bi.
- Bi Boxie: Miss Bi's father, a wealthy man and prominent member of the local gentry.
- Miss Bi: Ruhua's proposed fiancee after being separated from Aren. 15 years old, beautiful, and proficient in calligraphy and poetry.
- Sister Trey: Sold Aren into prostitution as a concubine to a man named Lin.

== Perspective ==
The novel is told through the first person perspective of Qin Ruhua, an adolescent boy of sixteen, who finds himself in conflict with the world around him, as he falls in love with a girl named Gu Aren. Employing a first person narrative was not new to Chinese readers at the time, but it is arguably the first Chinese novel to sustain that point of view for the entire story. The Point of View also brings into question the reliability of the narrator in certain parts. Specifically, the truthfulness of certain claims are brought into question due to the motives of the author.
