= The New Story of the Stone =

The New Story of the Stone (T: 新石頭記, S: 新石头记) is a novel composed by Chinese author Wu Jianren and published in 1905. The novel is framed as a sequel of the classic novel, Dream of the Red Chamber (紅樓夢), by Cao Xueqin (曹雪芹).

An English translation by Liz Evans Weber was published by Columbia University Press in 2025.
