= The Travels of Lao Can =

1907 novel by Liu E

- Cover of a 1931 edition of The Travels of Lao Can
- Author: Liu E
- Original title: 老殘遊記
- Language: Chinese
- Publication place: Late Qing Dynasty
- Original text: 老殘遊記 at Chinese Wikisource

Cover of a 1930 edition of the novel

The opening of chapter one of The Travels of Lao Can, in an edition collected by the University of Tokyo

A page from an edition of the novel published in February 1949

The Travels of Lao Can (simplified Chinese: 老残游记; traditional Chinese: 老殘遊記; pinyin: Lǎo Cán Yóujì) is a novel by Liu E (1857–1909), written between 1903 and 1904 and published in 1907 to wide acclaim. Thinly disguising his own views in those of Lao Can, the physician hero, Liu describes the rise of the Boxers in the countryside, the decay of the Yellow River control system, and the hypocritical incompetence of the bureaucracy. Its social satire showed the limits of the old elite and officialdom and gave an in-depth look into everyday life in the countryside in the late Qing period.

== Publication history ==
The first 13 chapters were serialized in the bi-weekly Xiuxiang Xiaoshuo (simplified Chinese: 绣像小说; traditional Chinese: 繡像小說; Illustrated Fiction) from March 1903 to January 1904, in issues 9 through 18. It was published in the Tianjin Riri Xinwen Bao (simplified Chinese: 天津日日新闻报; traditional Chinese: 天津日日新聞報; lit. 'Tientsin Daily News') in a 20 chapter version with a prologue.

== Plot ==
In the prologue Lao Can (T: 老殘, S: 老残; literally, "Old Decrepit"), a traveling medical practitioner, dreams of China being a sinking ship. After the dream ends, Lao Can goes on a journey to fix the problems experienced by China. In the story Lao Can attempts to correct injustices, change attitudes towards women, and engage in philosophical discussions about China's future. Lao Can also acts as a detective in several small crime-related plots.

== Style ==
The scholar Milena Doleželová-Velingerová writes that the integration of the detective subplots, "entirely dissimilar to its lyrical components," "makes the novel so innovative." She remarks on the use of poetry and symbolism that "What sets this novel apart from the others is just this nonaction discourse, including the famous poetic descriptions of Chinese landscape, which are, however, meant to be understood not merely as images of natural beauty but as metaphorical statements about the condition of society."

== Analysis ==
Donald Holoch argues that the entire book and not merely the prologue should be viewed as an allegory, and that if any other approach had been used, the novel would lack unity. In particular he believes that the novel's characters and events illustrate a "complex conservatism" that concludes that technology instead of social change is the answer to the problems experienced by China. Cordell D. K. Yee's review of The Chinese Novel at the Turn of the Century, however, argues that "it is doubtful that all episodes conform" to the allegory concept. Robert E. Hegel, in a review argues that Holoch's interpretation is persuasive and "makes a substantial contribution to the studies of the novel".

== English translations ==
- Liu T'ieh-yün (1952). The Travels of Lao Ts'an. Translated by Harold Shadick. Cornell University Press. This extensively annotated translation was finished in 1939, published by Cornell University Press in 1952, and issued in paperback in 1990 with a new Introduction. Timothy Wong finds that "more than anyone, Shaddick succeeds in capturing in English Liu E's riveting descriptions, which critics from Hu Shih and C.T. Hsia have seen as the greatest merit of his fiction."
- Liu E (1983). The Travels of Lao Can. Translated by Yang Xianyi and Gladys Yang. Chinese Literature Press. ISBN 9780835110754. First published in Nanjing in 1947, then, titled Mr. Derelict (London: Allen & Unwin, 1948).
