= Jaroslav Průšek =

Czech academic, translator, sinologist and science writer

Chinese name
- Traditional Chinese: 普實克
- Simplified Chinese: 普实克
Transcriptions
Standard Mandarin
- Hanyu Pinyin: Pǔshíkè
- Wade–Giles: P‘u-shih-k‘o

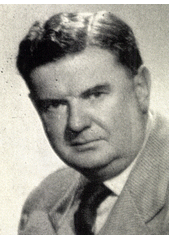
Jaroslav Průšek

Jaroslav Průšek (1906–1980) was a Czech sinologist. He was considered as the founder of the Prague School of Sinology. He trained as an historian, with an interest in the history of ancient Greece, Byzantium and Roman Empire at Charles University. After graduating from Charles University, he went to Germany and Sweden and became the student of Bernard Karlgren. He was sent to China and Japan in the 1930s, where he became friends with many Chinese intellectuals, including Lu Xun. He went back to Czechoslovakia in 1937. In 1952, he was appointed head of Institute of East Asian Studies of Charles University. His students included Marián Gálik and Milena Doleželová-Velingerová.

He was a pioneer in a range of topics ranging from Song dynasty vernacular literature and modern Chinese literature. He lived in what Leo Ou-fan Lee called "the era of giants."

== Selected works ==
=== Books ===
- Dictionary of Oriental Literature
- The lyrical and the epic: studies of modern Chinese literature
- Chinese history and literature: collection of studies
- Chinese states and the northern barbarians in the period 1400-300 B.C
- The origins and the authors of the hua-pen
- Die Literatur des befreiten China und ihre Volkstraditionen
- Études d'histoire et de littérature chinoises offertes au professeur Jaroslav Průšek
- My sister China, His memoir about his experiences in China.
- Three sketches of Chinese literature

=== Articles ===
- —— (1961). "Basic Problems of the History of Modern Chinese Literature and C. T. Hsia, History of Modern Chinese Fiction". T'oung Pao. 49 (4): 357–404. doi:10.1163/156853262X00129. JSTOR 4527525.

== References and further reading ==
- Gálik, Marián (1998). "Jaroslav Prùsek: A Myth and Reality as Seen by His Pupil" (PDF). Asian and African Studies. 2: 151–161. Archived from the original (PDF) on 2022-03-13.
- Lee, Leo Ou-fan (2017), "Tribute To Jaroslav PruŠek (1906–1980): Unpacking Prùsek'sConception Of The "Lyrical": A Tribute And Some Intercultural Reflections" (PDF), AUC Philologica, 4: 151–166, doi:10.14712/24646830.2017.46
- -- , "The Legacies of Jaroslav Průšek and C.T.Hsia," in David Der-wei Wang, ed., New Literary History of Modern China (Cambridge, MA: Harvard University Press, 2017), pp. 644- 650,
- Xiaoqing Diana Lin, "Jaroslav Průšek: Communism, Modernization, and Chinese Literary Studies During the Cold War, 1950s−1960s," in Michael Brose and Antonina Luszczykiewicz eds., Sinology During the Cold War (Abingdon, Oxon.; NY: Routledge; 2022),
- Lomová, Olga (2021). "Jaroslav Průšek (1906–1980): A Man of His Time and Place". The Journal of the European Association for Chinese Studies. 2: 169–196. doi:10.25365/jeacs.2021.2.169-196. Open access online, includes extensive bibliography.
