= A Strange Case of Nine Murders =

1906 novel by Wu Jianren

Cover of Jiuming Qiyuan, 1925, collection of the Jilin University

A Strange Case of Nine Murders (C: 九命奇冤, P: Jiǔmìng Qíyuān, W: Chiu-ming ch'i-yüan) is a 1906 Chinese murder mystery novel by Wu Jianren (Wu Woyao). Douglas Lancashire and Edel Lancashire's English translation was published in 1998.

== Plot ==
The Liang and Ling families were originally relatives during the reign of Emperor Yongzheng of the Qing Dynasty, but they became enemies due to feng shui issues. The Ling family abused their power and allowed their followers to set fire to the Liang family, killing eight people. They also bribed the government to make the Liang family lose the case. Finally, the Liang family went to Beijing to file a complaint. Emperor Yongzheng sent an imperial envoy to investigate the case openly and secretly, and finally redressed the Liang family. The work uses ancient stories to attack the corrupt officials of the time, but it affirms the supreme ruler and shows a reformist tendency. The novel uses flashbacks and is greatly influenced by foreign literature.

== Analysis ==
Gilbert Fong, the author of "Time in Nine Murders: Western Influence and Domestic Tradition", published in The Chinese Novel at the Turn of the Century, documented shifts in time. Fong argued that the manipulation received inspiration from foreign models, Cantonese ballads, and traditional Chinese crime stories (gongan). Fong also stated that the "time inversion" technique appears more often than the previous literature about A Strange Case of Nine Murders indicates. Robert E. Hegel, author of a book review of The Chinese Novel at the Turn of the Century, wrote that Fong corrected an opinion about A Strange Case of Nine Murders that had been written by Hu Shih. Doar wrote that Fong's writing was "an especially solid piece of scholarship."

== Reception ==
Bruce Doar, who wrote a book review of The Chinese Novel at the Turn of the Century, stated that A Strange Case of Nine Murders was "regarded as one of the finest novels of the late Qing period." Doar argued that "due to the opening", it was "one of the most innovative" novels.
