= The Sing-song Girls of Shanghai =

Novel by Han Bangqing

- Traditional Chinese: 海上花列傳
- Simplified Chinese: 海上花列传
Transcriptions
Standard Mandarin
- Hanyu Pinyin: Hǎishàng Huā Lièzhuàn
- Wade–Giles: Hai-shang Hua Lieh-chuan
Wu
- Romanization: he2 zaan3 ho1 lih4 zoe3

The Sing-song Girls of Shanghai, also translated as Shanghai Flowers or Biographies of Flowers by the Seashore, is an 1892 novel by Han Bangqing.

The novel, the first such novel to be serially published, chronicles lives of prostitutes in Shanghai in the late 19th century. Unlike most prostitution-oriented novels in Wu Chinese, specifically the Suzhou dialect, all dialog in this novel is in Wu.

The writer Eileen Chang translated the book into Mandarin, published in two parts under the titles "海上花開" and "海上花落" (lit. The Flowers of the Sea Bloom / Fade" or "The Flowers of Shanghai Bloom / Fade"). She also translated the book into English, which was not discovered until after her death. Eva Hung revised and edited the English translation before its publication.

Wilt L. Idema, who wrote a book review of The Chinese Novel at the Turn of the Century in T'oung Pao, wrote that the novel Shanghai Flowers included the use of Wu in dialogs, a "doomed to failure" protagonist, and a consciously crafted plot, therefore the book "already showed many of the characteristics of a typical Late Ch'ing novel".

A film adaptation called Flowers of Shanghai was made in 1998.

== Reception ==
Hu Shih, Lu Xun, and other Chinese literary figures critically acclaimed Shanghai Flowers. However, the novel did not sell very well. Lesley Downer of The New York Times wrote that few people read the novel in China as of 2005.

Hu Shih's thesis is that because the novel had such a strong usage of Wu, readers had difficulty understanding it. Donald B. Snow, author of Cantonese as Written Language: The Growth of a Written Chinese Vernacular, wrote that generally the sales of other novels outperformed Shanghai Flowers because their limited usage of the Wu made them easier to read. David Der-wei Wang argued that the main usage of Wu in the novel was only by the prostitute characters and therefore the original novel would be fairly understood by other Chinese speakers. Wang concluded that the language would not be the reason for the novel's continued unpopularity since Chang had written her Mandarin translation. Instead, Wang argued that Han Bangqing's "matter-of-fact" way of describing things, which opposes opulent descriptions of events and food; and the general lack of sensationalism and "sentimental narcissism" contribute to "the fact that it does not read like the prostitute novel we generally know."

== English translation ==
- Han Bangqing (2005) [1892]. The Sing-song Girls of Shanghai. Translated by Eileen Chang and Eva Hung. Columbia University Press. ISBN 9780231122689.

== See also ==
- Nine-tailed Turtles
