= Liu E (writer) =

Chinese writer (1857–1909)

Liu E 劉鶚 / 劉鉄雲 / 鴻都百煉生
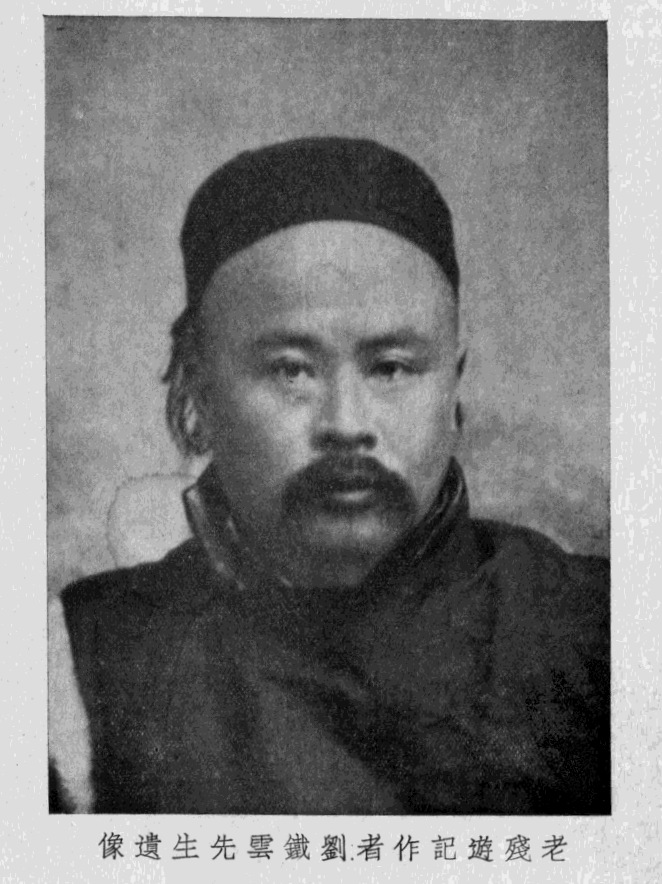
- Born: 18 October 1857; Dantu, Jiangsu
- Died: 23 August 1909 (aged 51); Dihua, Xinjiang
- Occupations: Writer, scholar, politician
- Writing career
- Pen name: Hong Du Bai Lian Sheng; Chinese: 鸿都百炼生
- Language: Chinese
- Period: Late Qing era
- Genre: Illustrated fiction
- Notable work: The Travels of Lao Can

Liu E (simplified Chinese: 刘鹗; traditional Chinese: 劉鶚; pinyin: Liú È; Wade–Giles: Liu E; also spelled Liu O; 18 October 1857 – 23 August 1909), courtesy name Tieyun (simplified Chinese: 铁云; traditional Chinese: 鐵雲; pinyin: Tiěyún; Wade–Giles: T'ieh-yün), was a Chinese writer, archaeologist and politician of the late Qing Dynasty.

== Government and politics ==
Liu was a native of Dantu (modern day Zhenjiang). In the government, he worked with flood control, famine relief, and railroads. He became disillusioned with official ideas of reform and became a proponent of private economic development modeled after western systems. During the Boxer Uprising he speculated in government rice, distributing it to the poor. He was cashiered for these efforts, but shrewd investments had left him wealthy enough to follow his pioneering archaeological studies of the oracle bone inscriptions and to write fiction.

== Literature ==
Liu's best known work is The Travels of Lao Can, which the critic C.T. Hsia calls the "most beloved of all the novels" in the last decade of the Qing.

Liu E's novels borrowed allusions and images from classical Chinese literature and used extensive symbolism. Therefore, his works appealed to readers who had a classical education and were considered sophisticated.

== Oracle bone archaeology and scholarship ==
In 1903 Liu published the first collection of 1,058 oracle bone rubbings entitled Tieyun Canggui (鐵雲藏龜, Tie Yun's [i.e., Liu E] Repository of Turtles) that helped launch the study of oracle bone inscriptions as a distinct branch of Chinese epigraphy.

== Exile and death ==
Liu was framed for malfeasance related to his work during the Boxer Rebellion and was exiled in 1908, dying within the next year in Dihua of the Xinjiang Province (today known as Ürümqi).
