= Jin Tianhe =

Jin Tianhe (Chinese: 金天翮; 1873 – 1947) was a scholar, poet, politician, and writer from the Anhui Province. Jin Tianhe is most well-known for publishing the first Chinese feminist manifesto, The Women's Bell. Other popular works include Jiangsu, The Weekly Independent, A Flower In A Sinful Sea, and The Grand Magazine. Jin Tianhe was born into nobility during the Qing era and received an elite education, but was greatly critical of the government and supported the overthrow of the Qing. Themes of Jin Tianhe's work include racial envy, gender equality, women's rights, and national salvation. Through his work, Jin Tianhe expressed his desire for gender equality and criticized the backwardness of China's social relations and government, while praising the West for their non-oppressive ideologies. Although his work was influential, it was often debated by other scholars and critiqued for being overly progressive and ignorant of contemporary realities. Currently, his contributions to the feminist movement is still expressed by a large number of actors through media, books, and speeches.

== Early life ==
Jin Tianhe was born in 1873 to a wealthy family in the Anhui Province, and subsequently received an elite education at local academies. However, after failing his imperial civil service examination, Jin Tianhe turned to statecraft (jingshi) learning to gain acceptance from the elite.

== Political career ==
A supporter of the Revolutionary Army, Jin Tianhe supported nationalist Zou Rong's publication The Revolutionary Army (Geming Jun), which criticized the Qing court, the Manchu rulers of China, and advocated for national and social revolution. Ultimately, when the government authorities attempted to prosecute Zou Roug, Jin Tianhe's payments to defend Zou Roug failed. After the 1911 Revolution (Xinhai Revolution), which had ended the Qing dynasty, Jin Tianhe worked in education-related government posts and served as a parliamentary representative for the Jiangsu province. In 1932, with others like Zhang Taiya, Jin Tianhe founded the Society for National Learning.

== Writing ==
=== The Women's Bell: 1903 ===
Published in 1903 by Datong Shuji in Shanghai to highlight collective womanhood in the context of nationalism and gendered social relations in China, Jin Tianhe incorporated a number of themes in the first Chinese feminist manifesto, including racial envy, gender equality, and oppression. In the title of the treatise, Jin Tianhe uses the imagery of a bell to call for systematic support for women's rights, education, marriage, suffrage and freedom. Although intellectuals in the 1898 period had begun to incorporate gender equality into national agendas, The Women's Bell enlightened women and was the first to identify Chinese woman as nujie, thus conceptualizing collective female identity. In the treatise, Jin Tianhe expressed that Chinese nujie were oppressed and aspired for a "women's revolutionary army" to overthrow male authority and improve women's rights.

Further, Jin Tianhe believed that there are several elements in overcoming gender inequality. In the treatise, Jin states that if superstition continues to be a persistent problem for Chinese women, Chinese society would not be able to modernize or develop. To defeat this, Jin Tianhe suggested that their inherently emotional nature can be overcome by education and that the future generation of women would not experience this kind of gullibility. Solutions included temples being transformed into schools for women to attend, which would also be symbolic of China's modernization and be fruitful for religious leaders and women. Not only would it alleviate oppression, women being educated at temples would eliminate superstitious activities and support the essential role of women in society. In the third chapter, Jin highlights the "four great obstructions for women" (女子之品性): foot-binding (纏足), decorative clothing (裝飾), superstition (迷信), and restrictions on movement (拘束). By eliminating these obstructions, Jin Tianhe believed that Chinese women would be one step closer to liberation, as most of the obstructions are on their physical body and image. Further, in the context of national salvation, the preface of The Women's Bell Jin Tianhe centers it around China's lack vis-à-vis Euro–America and refers to China as "a country that knows no freedom" and "dreams of a young, white European man" with "free wife and children." By contrasting Euro-America to China, Jin Tianhe attributes China's backwardness of social relations, and highlights a gendered lack connected to national inadequacy.

=== Women's World ===
Although nujie was first introduced in the Women's Bell, the journal Women's World (Nüzi shijie; 女子世界) was the most widely circulated women's journal during the Qing era. Published by educator and journalist Ding Chuwo (丁初我 (1871–1930)), Women's World was published for three years until 1907, and included intensive writings on nujie by both men and women. Working with other male intellectuals like Jiang Weiqiao (蔣維喬, 1873 – 1958), Jin Tianhe contributed to the progressive journal and heavily supported gender equality by fighting for women's education, rights, and suffrage. Specifically, Jin Tianhe asserted his view that "the world of China's twentieth century was the world of Chinese women." In the preface of the first issue, Jin Tianhe likens the rise of "female national people" to "the flowers of civilization" (文明之花) and used hyperbolic imagery of nature to assert his belief that women's rights could cure China of any existing inequality or weakness Despite the influence of nujie, Jin Tianhe's desire for a "women's world" was criticized by fellow contributors to the journal. In the second issue of the journal, Ding Chuwo refuted Jin Tianhe's advocacy for progressive gender equality and desired a restoration of women's right that existed in ancient China, claiming that Chinese women endured vices such as "evil of emotions", (情魔, 'inability to nourish family, society, and China'), "evil of illness" (病魔, 'physical weakness'), the "evil of superstition" (神鬼魔, 'vastly low intellectual levels'), and the "evil of money" (金錢魔, 'excessive consumption of material goods').

=== A Flower Of A Sinful Sea ===
A Flower In A Sinful Sea is a political novel composed by Jin Tianhe and Zeng Pu that was published in Jiangsu, another of Jin Tianhe's literary works. Written in a roman à clef, the work was translated into English and French in 1982. The developer of the five main characters, Jin Tianhe's original intent was to criticize Russian–Chinese relations, and to once more express his dislike for the Qing dynasty and promote democracy. However, in 1904, Zeng Pu took control of the novel and made it into a thirty-chapter historical fiction instead. In the story, character Jin Wenqing fails to keep his promise of marrying a girl, leading her to commit suicide. However, after forging a relationship with Fu Caiyun, a sing-song girl who is a spitting image of his deceased girlfriend, he makes her his concubine. Throughout the novel, Jin Wenqing faces a series of retributions for his wrong-doings. Ultimately, he attempts to become a diplomat in Europe but fails, while Fu Caiyun experiences great success in China.

== Death and legacy ==
Jin Tianhe died in 1947. The first to name nujie, Jin Tianhe successfully defined women as a collectively oppressed group. This term has pervaded the twentieth century, as nujie is often expressed by a large number of actors when discussing their own nationalist motives through public speeches, the media, and fiction. The Women's Bell is considered to have left a significant mark on Chinese history. In the late twentieth history, feminist historian Li Yu-ning issued a facsimile reprint of the 1903 edition with an extended scholarly commentary (published by Outer sky Press) in 2003. In the same year, Shanghai Guji Chubanshe honored the one-hundredth anniversary of The Women's Bell by issuing a new print of the book.
