= Waldersee =

Coat of arms of the Counts von Waldersee

The Waldersee family (or von Waldersee) is an old German noble family, representing illegitimate branch of the House of Anhalt-Dessau.

== History ==
During his marriage, Leopold III, Duke of Anhalt-Dessau had a relationship with Johanna Eleonore von Neitschütz née Hoffmeyer (1739-1816), wife of Adolph Heinrich von Neitschütz (1730-1772), Master of the Horse at the Princely court of Anhalt-Dessau. Their illegitimate son, Franz Johann Georg (1763-1823) was granted the title of Count von Waldersee, heritable by all his legitimate male-line descendants.

== Notable members ==
- Alfred von Waldersee (1832–1904), German field marshal
- Friedrich Graf von Waldersee (1795–1864), German Prussian Lieutenant General and military author
- Georg von Waldersee (1860–1932), Imperial German Army general in World War I
