= Marián Gálik =

Jozef Marián Gálik ( 21 February 1933 – 27 September 2024) was a Slovak Sinologist, comparatist and literary theorist.

Born in Igram in western Slovakia (then a constituent of Czechoslovakia), he was a student of Jaroslav Průšek at Charles University in Prague between 1953 and 1958. He studied at Peking University between 1958 and 1960, and thereafter was a member of the Slovak Academy of Sciences. Well known for his studies on modern Chinese literature, his pathbreaking early research on Mao Dun was succeeded by studies including on the reception of Goethe, Nietzsche, and the Bible in China.

A winner of the Humboldt Award in 2003, his nomination hailed him as "one of the last great scholars of Europe who has a universal education at his disposal."
