= Lu Shi'e =

Chinese writer

Lu Shi'e (traditional Chinese: 陸士諤; simplified Chinese: 陆士谔; pinyin: Lù Shì'è; Wade–Giles: Lu Shih-o; 1878–1944) was a Chinese writer who previously worked as a doctor. His hometown was southwest of Shanghai. He wrote fanxin xiaoshuo works.

In 1910 he wrote Xin Zhongguo ("New China"). Xin Zhongguo depicted a universal exposition in Shanghai. Xu Leiying of China Radio International stated that he predicted the Shanghai Expo.

Roland Altenberger, author of The Sword Or the Needle: The Female Knight-errant (xia) in Traditional Chinese Narrative, wrote that Lu Shi'e was classified as an "obscure" author prior to a 2000 symposium on Lu Shi'e in Shanghai. According to Altenburger, Princeton University's Gest Oriental Library, home to the East Asian Library and the Gest Collection, has the largest collection of works made by Lu Shi'e.

== Works ==
- I yao nan chên ("Guide to medicine")
- Xin Shuihu ("New Water Margin")
- Xin Zhongguo ("New China")
- Qing Shi Yanyi (清史演義/清史演义 "Embellished History of the Qing" – 1913–1917)
