= Xin Zhongguo =

1910 novel by Lu Shi'e

Xin Zhongguo (Chinese: 新中國 "New China") is a 1910 novel written by Lu Shi'e. It is also known as Lixian sishi nianhou zhi Zhongguo ("China, forty years after the establishment of the constitutional monarchy"). It was inspired by Xin Zhongguo weilai ji, a 1902 novel by Liang Qichao. Song Weijie, author of Mapping Modern Beijing: Space, Emotion, Literary Topography, wrote that the book "[envisions] a modern Shanghai and a strong China standing proudly in the ranks of nation-states."

The novel begins in Shanghai, depicted as modern and well-off, in 1950. The main character, after awakening, learns that Dr. Su Hanmin, the inventor of a spiritual medicine, used it to pull Chinese away from opium-laden dependence on Westerners as they become willing to help others, allowing them to become prosperous. The foreign concessions were dissolved. By 1950, China has a surplus in funds, as well as established universities and a thriving industrial sector. It annexed Tibet as one of its provinces, and in China male and female citizens possess the same rights. Xin Zhongguo depicted a universal exposition in Shanghai. The novel reveals that the protagonist was merely dreaming about this new China, and that it had not yet happened.

Xu Leiying of China Radio International stated that the author predicted the Expo 2010, held in Shanghai in 2010. David Der-wei Wang stated that the framework of Xin Zhongguo, using a dream, "[deflates] the fantastic magnitude of the center narrative." David Wang wrote that of the books inspired by Xin Zhongguo weilai ji it had "the most complete narrative".

== See also ==
- Chinese science fiction
