= Wu Jianren =

Chinese writer

Jianren Wu
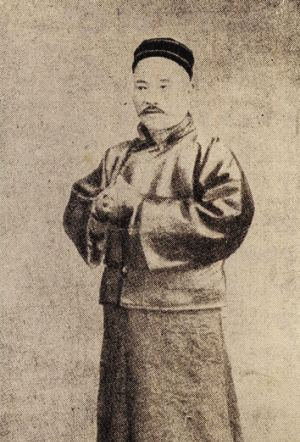
- Wu Jianren at 42
- Born: 1866; Fatshan, Kwangtung, China
- Died: 1910 (aged 42–43)
- Occupation: Writer

Wu Jianren (T: 吳趼人, S: 吴趼人, P: Wú Jiǎnrén, W: Wu Chien-jen, J: Ng4 Gaan2 Jan4; 1866–1910), also known as Wu Woyao (T: 吳沃堯, S: 吴沃尧, P: Wú Wòyáo, W: Wu Wo-yao, J: Ng4 Juk1 Jiu4) was a Chinese writer of the late Qing period. A native of Fatshan, Kwangtung province, he is known for several novels, namely Bizarre Happenings Eyewitnessed over Two Decades, A Strange Case of Nine Murders, and The Sea of Regret. Wu Jianren is a representative figure of modern Chinese novel for his innovation and technique. He was writing modern fiction at least a decade before Lu Xun, and was ahead of his time in his use of narrators and a centralized character. From 1902 to 1910, Wu Jianren wrote the most articles in the group of writers who responded to Liang Qichao's "revolution of Chinese novel".

== Life ==
Wu Jianren was born in 1866, in Fatshan, Kwantung province. His great-great-grandfather, grandfather, and his father had all worked for the Qing government. Soon after he was born, his family changed his name from Baozhen to Woyao. Wu Jianren began school when he was eight, then enrolled in Foshan Academy at the age of 12. He lived in poverty since his father died in 1882, when he was 17 years old. In 1883, at age 18 Wu Jianren moved to Shanghai and began working as a waiter in a tea house and a clerk in Jiangnan Manufacture General Bureau (now known as Jiangnan shipyard). In 1897, he began to work as an editor for 《字林滬報》(Zilin Shanghai news)、《采風報》(Wind collector news)、《奇新報》(Peculiar news)、《寓言報》(Fable news), etc. Later in 1906, he became the Chief editor of 《月月小說》(alternative title All-story monthly). Then, he continues his life as a writer, his work includes fables, biography, and opera. He never became rich and died in October 1910 (45 years old) due to the poverty and overwork.

Between 1902 and 1910, Wu Jianren start to publish his work. He used the knowledge that he learned in traditional Chinese study to create many great pieces of Novels-poetry, anecdotes, fiction criticism and joke collections. Influenced by Liang Qichao's "revolution of Chinese novel", he began writing the "New Novel". In those social novels, he uses irony to reflect his concern about the loss of traditional Chinese culture and examined social problems in China. Among his major works was Strange Events Seen in the Past Twenty Years.

== Writing style ==
Wu Jianren wrote novels for an audience who did not receive a classical education, and used everyday vernacular speech in his works.

Wu Jianren recorded stories from newspapers that he could use as a source in his work within a notebook. Bao Tianxiao, the editor of early Republican journal Funu Shibao 婦女時報 and another novelist who wrote an account of Wu Jianren's notebook, used this technique to write Shanghai Chunqiu (上海春秋; Shanghai records).

In some of Wu Jianren's novels he let the self-conscious author-narrator lead readers to understand the fiction setting. He also sometime employed a prologue to help develop the fiction scene. Because he says that his story included some events that himself witnessed, so he can not write those work like other normal novels. Some scholars think Wu Jianren's work was inspired by Western translated novels. Such as A mystery book of Liang Tianlai was considered as Oriental Sherlock Holmes. They also believe in his work Strange Grievance Case of Nine Lives that the special narrative technique in this novel was influenced by the writing style in Western novels.

== Works ==
- Bizarre Happenings Eyewitnessed over Two Decades (二十年目睹之怪現狀)
- Sea of Regret (恨海)
- Jiuming Qiyuan (strange grievance case of nine lives) (九命奇冤)
- The New Story of the Stone (新石頭記)

《二十年目睹之怪現狀》 (Bizarre Happenings Eyewitnessed over Two Decades) is one of the "Four Best Condemnation Novels in the Late Qing Dynasty". The story was about the main character's "a narrow escape from death" (九死一生). Twenty years in the novel had elapsed since his father's death, and ends in the failure of his business. The story reveals to the reader a very comprehensive look into Qing-dynasty society. The novel not only discusses the main character's motivations for wanting to build his enterprise, but also talks about the many different kinds of peoples' lives in Qing dynasty, from thief to government agent, to monk and et cetera.

《九命奇冤》(Strange Grievance Case of Nine Lives) is a novel written about《梁天來警富奇書》(A mystery book of Liang Tianlai).

《新石頭記》(The New Story of the Stone) is a novel continued the story of Cao Xueqin's novel《紅樓夢》 (Dream of the red chamber). This is a fantasy story about Jia Baoyu exploring China in 1900s.

According to editors themselves《月月小说》(alternative title All-story monthly) is a magazine with a main idea that "We talk about all weird things, many kinds of articles; with people who have amazing ideas, talk about truth, make the society better and inspire people"
