= Sea of Regret =

1906 novel by Wu Jianren

Cover of Henhai, collected by Jilin University

Sea of Regret or The Sea of Regret (Chinese: 恨海; pinyin: hènhǎi; Wade–Giles: Hen-hai) is a 1906 novel in 10 chapters by Wu Jianren (Wu Woyao). Set in the turmoil surrounding the Boxer Uprising of 1900, the plot involves two couples, whose arranged marriages cannot be completed. The husband-to-be of one couple dies from opium addiction, and his brother’s bride-to-be becomes a prostitute.

The novel was one of the best sellers of the decade and is taken to be a response to foreign-inspired attacks on traditional Chinese marriage.

There are two English translations:

- The Sea of Regret translated by Patrick Hanan, published by the University of Hawaiʻi Press in 1995. In a review by Jie Lu, of the University of the Pacific, Hanan was praised for his translation, cultural context, and commitment to remaining true to the original. Hanan later wrote a collection of essays, Chinese Fiction of the Nineteenth and Early Twentieth Centuries (Columbia University Press, 2004), including an essay in which he reflects on the meaning of the original story, specifically, its cultural significance, and reiterates the techniques used by Wu Jianren in The Sea of Regret to convey that to readers.
- Sea of Regret: China's First Modern Love Story translated by Douglas Lancashire and Edel Lancashire, published in 1998 in the UK

== Background ==
Wu Jianren claimed that he dashed off his 1906 novel in ten days. It became one of the most famous novels of the period. Patrick Hanan explains that Sea of Regret was Wu’s response to Stones in the Sea, a novel published a few months earlier, under the pseudonym Fu Lin. Stones in the Sea is narrated by the hero of a tragic love affair to dramatize the conflict between the traditional Chinese system of arranged marriage and the wishes of the young people involved. The story emphasizes the rights of the young people rather than their responsibilities to their families. Wu Jianren felt that this seemed to emphasize sexual passion or even lechery rather than love of parents.

Michael Egan argues that the plot determines the character and therefore the characters are subordinate to the plot, rather than the character determining the plot, as the case is in traditional novels.

== Themes ==
Free marriage:

One of the main themes of the novel is the concept of free vs. arranged marriages. These themes are expressed with the huge toll on the main couple in the book, Dihua and Bohe who were arranged to be married when they were young. Dihua puts the ideas of marriage, and the strict moral codes around engaged couples even during the life and death situation of the boxer uprising. As Dihua is forced to choose between her duty to follow traditional marriage and the vow she is supposed to keep to her fiancé she starts breaking down. The similar fate befalls Bohe’s brother who’s fiancée becomes a prostitute. Both of the couples break up.

Family:

Dihua throughout the story has to choose between doing what is needed to survive and following societal norms to ensure her family's honor. In one scene Dihua is unsure whether or not to sleep using the sheets that her fiancé uses. This dilemma is confusing to her mother because she is more focused on survival. Similarly Dihua works hard throughout the book to keep her idea of family and tries her hardest to keep her ill mother alive.
