= Han Bangqing =

- Traditional Chinese: 韓邦慶
- Simplified Chinese: 韩邦庆
Transcriptions
Standard Mandarin
- Hanyu Pinyin: Hán Bāngqìng
- Wade–Giles: Han Pang-ch'ing
Wu
- Romanization: hhoe3 paan1 qin3

Han Bangqing (Chinese: 韓邦慶; pinyin: Hán Bāngqìng; Wade–Giles: Han Pang-ch'ing; 1856–1894), also known by the given name Ji (寄), courtesy name Ziyun (子雲), and pseudonyms Taixian (太仙), Dayi Shanren (大一山人), Hua Ye Lian Nong (花也憐儂), and Sanqing (三慶), was a late-Qing dynasty Chinese writer from Lou County, Songjiang Prefecture, Jiangsu (now a district of Shanghai).

== Biography ==
As a child he went with his father to live in Beijing. He failed at the imperial examinations many times, even though he had a reputation as a prodigy in his childhood, and eventually wrote for the newspaper Shen Bao in Shanghai. In 1892, he started what can be considered China's first for-profit literary magazine, the Wonderbook of Shanghai (海上奇書; Haishang qishu), which lasted eight months, and in which he published his novel Shanghai Hua in instalments. The novel has been widely acclaimed as a classic (particularly by Lu Xun, Hu Shih, and Eileen Chang) but is little read today, likely due to its being written entirely in Wu Chinese, unintelligible to Mandarin speakers.

It was translated into Mandarin and English by Eileen Chang. After Chang's death in 1995, the translation was discovered among her papers and published in English as The Sing-song Girls of Shanghai in 2005 after revision by Eva Hung.

Not long after publication of the novel, in 1894, Han Bangqing died, age 38.
