= Milena Doleželová-Velingerová =

Czech-Canadian sinologist (1932–2012)

- Born: February 8, 1932; Prague, Bohemia, Czechoslovakia
- Died: October 20, 2012 (aged 80); Toronto, Ontario, Canada
- Education: Charles University in Prague
- Scientific career
- Fields: Chinese literature
- Workplaces: University of Toronto; University of Michigan; Czechoslovak Academy of Sciences
- Doctoral advisor: Jaroslav Průšek

Chinese name
- Chinese: 米列娜
Transcriptions
Standard Mandarin
- Hanyu Pinyin: Mǐ Liènà
- Wade–Giles: Mi Lieh-na

Milena Doleželová-Velingerová (February 8, 1932 – October 20, 2012) was a renowned Czech sinologist. Having studied with Jaroslav Průšek in Prague and Wu Xiaoling 吳曉鈴 in Peking, she left Prague in 1968 after the Soviet invasion, and made her later career at the University of Toronto. After retirement in 1996, she continued to publish widely.

Milena Doleželová-Velingerová received her M.A. degree from Charles University in Prague in 1955 and her Ph.D. degree from the Czechoslovak Academy of Sciences in 1964.

== Bibliography ==
- Ballad of the Hidden Dragon. Translated by Doleželová-Velingerová, Milena; Crump, James I. Oxford University Press. 1971.
- Doleželová-Velingerová, Milena, ed. (1980). The Chinese Novel at the Turn of the Century. University of Toronto Press.
- Doleželová-Velingerová, Milena, ed. (1988). A Selective Guide to Chinese Literature 1900–1949, Vol. 1: The Novel. E.J. Brill.
- Hanan, Patrick; Doleželová-Velingerová, Milena, eds. (1998). Wu Xiaoling Remembered. Dharma Gaia.
- Doleželová-Velingerová, Milena; Král, Oldřich, eds. (2001). The Appropriation of Cultural Capital: China's May Fourth Project. Harvard University Asia Center.
- Doleželová-Velingerová, Milena; Wagner, Rudolf, eds. (2013). Chinese Encyclopaedias of New Global Knowledge (1870-1930). Springer.
