= David Der-wei Wang =

Chinese literary historian (b.1954)

- Born: Wang Der-wei; 6 November 1954 (age 71)
- Education: National Taiwan University (BA); University of Wisconsin-Madison (MA, PhD)

Academic background
- Thesis: Verisimilitude in realist narrative: Mao Tun's and Lao She's early novels (1982)
- Doctoral advisor: Arthur E. Kunst

Academic work
- Discipline: Sinology
- Institutions: Columbia University; Harvard University

Chinese name
- Chinese: 王德威
Transcriptions
Standard Mandarin
- Hanyu Pinyin: Wáng Déwēi
- Wade–Giles: Wang2 Te2-wei1

David Der-wei Wang (Chinese: 王德威; pinyin: Wáng Déwēi; born November 6, 1954) is a Taiwanese-American literary historian and sinologist who is the Edward C. Henderson Professor of Chinese Literature at Harvard University. He has written extensively on modern and contemporary Chinese literature and intellectual history. His concepts of "repressed modernities", "post-loyalism", and "modern lyrical tradition" have been influential in the field of Chinese literary studies.

== Life and career ==
Wang was born in Taipei, Taiwan. After graduating from Cheng Kung Senior High School, he graduated from National Taiwan University with a B.A. in foreign languages and literature. He then earned an M.A. in 1978 and his Ph.D. in 1982 in comparative literature from the University of Wisconsin at Madison. His doctoral dissertation was titled, "Verisimilitude in realist narrative: Mao Tun's and Lao She's early novels".

Wang taught at National Taiwan University (1982–1986), Harvard University (1986–1990), and Columbia University (1990–2004). He served as the head of the Department of East Asian Languages and Cultures at Columbia University (designated in 1997), when he taught there as the Dean Lung Professor of Chinese Studies. In 2000, he succeeded Irene Bloom as chair of the University Committee on Asia and the Middle East. In 2004, he rejoined Harvard University and was named Edward C. Henderson Professor of East Asian Languages and Cultures. Wang received the Changjiang Scholar Award in the People's Republic of China in 2008. He was the 2013–14 Humanitas Visiting Professor of Chinese Studies at the Centre for Research in the Arts, Social Sciences and Humanities at Cambridge University, where he gave 3 public lectures on the "Chineseness" of Chinese literature. He is one of the chapter contributors of The Cambridge History of Chinese Literature.

In addition, Wang has been the editor of "Modern Chinese Literature from Taiwan" series published by Columbia University Press which include works by writers such as Huang Chun-ming, Yang Mu, and Chu Tʽien-wen.

Wang was elected as an Academician of Academia Sinica (2004) and member of the American Academy of Arts and Sciences (2020). Aside from his scholarship, Wang has written numerous book reviews in Chinese since 1980s and is recognised as an active and accomplished literary critic in Taiwan. He received the National Award for Arts in Taiwan for a volume of critical writings on Chinese fiction in 1993. He also translated Michel Foucault's The Archaeology of Knowledge into Chinese.

== Selected works ==
- Wang, David Der-wei (1992). Fictional realism in twentieth-century China: Mao Dun, Lao She, Shen Congwen. New York: Columbia University Press. ISBN 0231076568.
- Wang, David Der-wei (1997). Fin-de-Siècle Splendor: Repressed modernities of late Qing fiction, 1849–1911. Stanford, Ca: Stanford University Press. ISBN 9780804728454.. The first full-length English language survey of late Qing dynasty fiction, it has been praised as a major contribution to scholarship on the fiction of the era.
- Wang, David Der-wei (2004). The monster that is history: history, violence, and fictional writing in twentieth-century China. Berkeley: University of California Press. ISBN 9780520238732.. Reflections on violence in Chinese fiction and real-world history, covering famous writers such as Lu Xun and Mao Dun as well as less-well-known ones from mainland China and Taiwan.
- Wang, Der-wei (2005), 如此繁華：王德威自選集 [Urban Splendor: Selected Writings of Wang Der-wei] (in Chinese (Hong Kong)), Hong Kong: Cosmos Books, ISBN 9882111408. A collection of essays discussing the history of modern literary creation in three cities: Hong Kong, Shanghai, and Taipei.
- Wang, Der-wei (2007). 後遺民寫作 [Post-loyalist Writing]. Taipei: Rye Field Publishing. ISBN 9789861732992.
- Wang, Der-wei (2007). 王德威精選集 [Selected essays of David Der-wei Wang]. Taipei: Chiu Ko. ISBN 9789574443864.
- Writing Taiwan : a new literary history. Durham: Duke University Press. 2007. ISBN 9780822338673.(co-edited with Carlos Rojas)
- Taiwan under Japanese colonial rule, 1895–1945: history, culture, memory, New York: Columbia University Press, 2006, ISBN 9780231137980 (co-edited with Ping-hui Liao)
- Wang, David Der-wei (2015). The lyrical in epic time : modern Chinese intellectuals and artists through the 1949 crisis. New York: Columbia University Press. ISBN 9780231170468.
- Wang, David Der-wei, ed. (2017). A new literary history of modern China. Cambridge, MA. ISBN 9780674967915.
