= Party Secretary of Guangzhou =

Government position in China

Secretary of the Guangzhou Municipal Committee of the Chinese Communist Party
- 中国共产党广州市委员会书记
- Emblem of the Chinese Communist Party

- Flag of the Chinese Communist Party
- Incumbent; Feng Zhonghua since 24 December 2025
- Guangzhou Municipal Committee of the Chinese Communist Party
- Type: Party Committee Secretary
- Status: Deputy provincial and ministerial-level official
- Member of: Guangzhou Municipal Standing Committee
- Seat: Guangzhou
- Nominator: Central Committee
- Appointer: Guangzhou Municipal Committee; Central Committee
- Inaugural holder: Zeng Zhi
- Formation: 1949
- Deputy: Deputy Secretary; Secretary-General

The secretary of the Guangzhou Municipal Committee of the Chinese Communist Party is the leader of the Guangzhou Municipal Committee of the Chinese Communist Party (CCP). As the CCP is the sole ruling party of the People's Republic of China (PRC), the secretary is the highest ranking post in Guangzhou, which outranks the mayor, conventionally being the deputy secretary of the municipal committee. The secretary is also the leader of the Standing Committee of the Guangzhou Municipal Committee.

The secretary is officially appointed by the CCP Central Committee based on the recommendation of the CCP Organization Department, which is then approved by the Politburo and its Standing Committee. The secretary could also appointed by a plenary meeting of the Guangzhou Municipal Committee, which the candidate must be the same as the one approved by the central government.

The current secretary is Feng Zhonghua, who took office on 24 December 2025.

== List of party secretaries ==
| No. | English name | Chinese name | Took office | Left office | References |
|---|---|---|---|---|---|
| 1 | Zeng Zhi | 曾志 | May 1949 | October 1949 | |
| 2 | Ye Jianying | 叶剑英 | October 1949 | December 1952 | |
| 3 | He Wei | 何伟 | December 1952 | October 1954 | |
| 4 | Wang De | 王德 | November 1954 | February 1965 | |
| 5 | Yong Wentao | 雍文涛 | February 1965 | June 1966 | |
| 6 | Huang Ronghai | 黄荣海 | June 1966 | December 1972 | |
| 7 | Yang Shangkun | 杨尚昆 | March 1979 | November 1980 | |
| 8 | Liang Lingguang | 梁灵光 | November 1980 | May 1983 | |
| 9 | Xu Shijie | 许士杰 | May 1983 | November 1986 | |
| 10 | Xie Fei | 谢非 | November 1986 | May 1988 | |
| 5 | Zhu Senlin | 朱森林 | May 1988 | June May 1991 | |
| 6 | Gao Siren | 高祀仁 | May 1991 | April 1998 | |
| 7 | Huang Huahua | 厉德馨 | April 1998 | September 2002 | |
| 8 | Lin Shusen | 林树森 | September 2002 | June 2006 | |
| 9 | Zhu Xiaodan | 朱小丹 | July 2006 | April 2010 | |
| 10 | Zhang Guangning | 张广宁 | April 2010 | December 2011 | |
| 11 | Wan Qingliang | 龚正 | 20 December 2011 | 27 June 2014 | |
| 12 | Ren Xuefeng | 任学锋 | 27 August 2014 | 20 July 2018 | |
| 13 | Zhang Shuofu | 张硕辅 | 20 July 2018 | 3 December 2021 | |
| 14 | Lin Keqing | 林克庆 | 3 December 2021 | 16 June 2023 | |
| 15 | Guo Yonghang | 郭永航 | 16 June 2023 | 24 December 2025 | |
| 16 | Feng Zhonghua | 冯忠华 | 24 December 2025 | Incumbent | |
