= 5th National Congress of the Kuomintang =

The 5th National Congress of the Kuomintang (Chinese: 中國國民黨第五次全國代表大会) was held from 12 to 23 November 1935, in Nanjing, China.

== Members of the Central Executive Committee ==
Chiang Kai-shek (zh: 蔣中正) (elected by General Assembly), Wang Jingwei (zh: 汪精卫), Hu Hanmin (zh: 胡汉民), Dai Jitao (zh: 戴季陶), Yan Xishan (zh: 阎锡山), Feng Yuxiang (zh: 冯玉祥), Yu Youren (zh: 于右任), Sun Fo (zh: 孙科), Wu Tieh-cheng (zh: 吴铁城), Ye Chucang (zh: 叶楚伧), He Yingqin (zh: 何应钦), Zhu Peide (zh: 朱培德), Zou Lu (zh: 邹鲁), Ju Zheng (zh: 居正), Chen Guofu (zh: 陈果夫), He Chengjun (zh: 何成浚), Chen Lifu (zh: 陈立夫), Shi Ying (zh: 石瑛), H. H. Kung (zh: 孔祥熙), Ding Weifen (zh: 丁惟汾), Zhang Xueliang (zh: 张学良), T. V. Soong (zh: 宋子文), Bai Chongxi (zh: 白崇禧), Liu Zhi (zh: 刘峙), Gu Zhutong (zh: 顾祝同), Zhu Jiahua (zh: 朱家骅), Yang Jie (zh: 杨杰), Ma Chao-chun (zh: 马超俊), Zhang Zhizhong (zh: 张治中), Ceng Kuoqing (zh: 曾扩情), He Zhonghan (zh: 贺衷寒), Jiang Dingwen (zh: 蒋鼎文), Fang Juehui (zh: 方觉慧), Chen Jitang (zh: 陈济棠), Huang Musong (zh: 黄慕松), Qian Dajun (zh: 钱大钧), Han Fuju (zh: 韩复榘), He Jian (zh: 何健), Ceng Yangfu (zh: 曾养甫), Liu Luyin (zh: 刘芦隐), Chen Cheng (zh: 陈诚), Zhou Fohai (zh: 周佛海), Xu Enzeng (zh: 徐恩曾), Hong Lanyou (zh: 洪兰友), Yu Ching-tang (zh: 余井塘), Chen Ce (zh: 陈策), Shao Yuanchong (zh: 邵元冲), Chang Tao-fan (zh: 张道藩), Chen Bulei (zh: 陈布雷), Fang Chih (zh: 方治), Chen Gongbo (zh: 陈公博), Liang Hancao (zh: 梁寒操), Li Zonghuang (zh: 李宗黄), Liu Jiwen (zh: 刘纪文), Xu Yuanquan (zh: 徐源泉), Pang Gongzhan (zh: 潘公展), Wang Faqin (zh: 王法勤), Bai Wenwei (zh: 柏文蔚), Wang Luyi (zh: 王陆一), Zhang Qun (zh: 张群), Liu Weichi (zh: 刘维炽), Wu Xingya (zh: 吴醒亚), Ding Chaowu (zh: 丁超五), Zhao Daiwen (zh: 赵戴文), Jiang Bocheng (zh: 蒋伯诚), Ku Meng-yu (zh: 顾孟余), Gan Naiguang (zh: 甘乃光), Chen Jicheng (zh: 陈继承), Xiao Jishan (zh: 萧吉珊), Wang Yizhe (zh: 王以哲), Li Wenfan (zh: 李文范), Chang Li-sheng (zh: 张厉生), Zhong Bomin (zh: 周伯敏), Wang Bailing (zh: 王柏龄), Miao Peicheng (zh: 苗培成), Liu Jianqun (zh: 刘健群), Gu Zhenggang (zh: 谷正纲), Mei Gongren (zh: 梅公任), Yu Hanmou (zh: 余汉谋), Zheng Zhannan (zh: 郑占南), Wang Shufang (zh: 王漱芳), Zhu Shaoliang (zh: 朱绍良), Li Yizhong (zh: 林翼中), Gu Zhenglun (zh: 谷正伦), Fu Zuoyi (zh: 傅作义), Wu Zhongxin (zh: 吴忠信), Wang Qi (zh: 王祺), Huang Xuchu (zh: 黄旭初), Dai Kuisheng (zh: 戴愧生), Yu Xuezhong (zh: 于学忠), Chen Zhaoying (zh: 陈肇英), Zhang Chong (zh: 张冲), Xiao Tongzi (zh: 萧同兹), Zhou Qigang (zh: 周启刚), Masud Sabri (zh: 麦斯武德), Wei Lihuang (zh: 卫立煌), Hong Ludong (zh: 洪陆东), Jiao Yitang (zh: 焦易堂), Li Shengda (zh: 李生达), Tian Kunshan (zh: 田昆山), Liu Xiang (zh: 刘湘), Chen Shaokuan (zh: 陈绍宽), Chen Yi (zh: 陈仪), Peng Xeupei (zh: 彭学沛), Mao Zuquan (zh: 茅祖权), Shen Honglie (zh: 沈鸿烈), Xiong Shihui (zh: 熊式辉), Xia Douyin (zh: 夏斗寅), Lu Zhonglin (zh: 鹿钟麟), Wang Boqun (zh: 王伯群), Xu Kan (zh: 徐堪), Fu Bingchang (zh: 傅秉常), Le Jingtao (zh: 乐景涛), Li Yangjing (zh: 李杨敬), Tang Youren (zh: 唐有壬), Wang Quansheng (zh: 王泉笙), Miao Peinan (zh: 缪培南), Wang Jun (zh: 王均), Luosang Jianzan (zh: 罗桑坚赞). (total 120 members)

== Results ==
Twelve Articles (Chinese: 中國國民黨黨員守則) Rules for members of the Kuomintang were adopted, and also a motion calling for a revision of the constitution to be drafted.

=== Institutional Reform ===
The congress adopted the Outline of the Central Executive Committee on Organization (zh: 中央执行委员会组织大纲), the Organic Law of the Central Commission (zh: 中央监察委员会组织法), and the Central Political Council was renamed as the Central Political Committee, which underwent restructuring.

The following ministers were installed:

- Minister of Organization: Chang Li-sheng (zh: 张厉生); Deputy Minister: Ku Cheng-kang (zh: 谷正綱)
- Minister of Propaganda/Publicity: Liu Luyin (zh: 刘芦隐); Deputy Minister: Fang Chih (zh: 方治)
- Minister of Training: Zhou Fohai (zh: 周佛海); Deputy: Wang Luyi (zh: 王陆一)
- Chairman of Overseas Party Planning Commission: Zhou Qigang (zh: 周启刚); Deputies: Xiao Jishan (zh: 萧吉珊), Chen Yaoyuan (zh: 陈耀垣)
- Chairman of the Local Autonomy Committee: Fang Juehui(zh: 方覺慧); Deputies: Li Zonghuang (zh: 李宗黄), Huang Jilu (zh: 黃季陸)
- Chairman of the National Economic Development Committee: Zeng Yangfu (zh: 曾养甫); Deputies: Deng Qingyang (zh: 鄧青陽), Xu Enzeng (zh: 徐恩曾)
- Chairman of the Culture Committee: Chen Guofu (zh: 陈果夫); Deputies: Zhe Minyi (zh: 禇民谊), Chang Tao-fan (zh: 張道藩)
- Chairman of the Historiography Committee: Shao Yuan-chong (zh: 邵元沖); Deputies: Luo Jialun (zh: 羅家倫), Mei Gongren (zh: 梅公任)
- Chairman of the Pension Committee: Wang Faqin (zh: 王法勤); Deputies: Li Wenfa (zh: 李文範), Hu Ludong (zh: 洪陆东)
- Chairman of the Finance Committee: Ju Zheng (zh: 居正); Deputies: Mai Huanzhang (zh: 麦焕章), Miao Peicheng (zh: 苗培成)

=== Constitutional Reform ===
On 5 May 1936, the General Assembly decided to announce the Draft Constitution of the Republic of China (zh: 中华民国宪法草案), confirmed by the National Assembly on 12 November.

== See also ==
- Kuomintang
