= 5th Congress =

5th Congress may refer to:

- 5th Congress of the Communist Party of Yugoslavia (1948)
- 5th Congress of the Philippines (1962–1965)
- 5th Congress of the Russian Social Democratic Labour Party (1907)
- 5th Congress of the Workers' Party of Korea (1970)
- 5th National Congress of the Chinese Communist Party (1927)
- 5th National Congress of the Communist Party of Vietnam (1982)
- 5th National Congress of the Kuomintang (1935)
- 5th National Congress of the Lao People's Revolutionary Party (1991)
- 5th National People's Congress (1978–1983)
- 5th United States Congress (1797–1799)
- Hague Congress (1872), the 5th Congress of the First International
- International Socialist Congress, Paris 1900, the 5th Congress of the Second International
