= Cao Jianliao =

Chinese politician

- 曹鉴燎

Vice Mayor of Guangzhou
- In office July 2007 – July 2014
- Party Secretary: Wan Qingliang
- Mayor: Chen Jianhua

Personal details
- Born: November 1955 (age 70) Guangzhou, Guangdong, China
- Party: Chinese Communist Party (1974–2014; expelled)
- Education: Jinan University

Chinese name
- Traditional Chinese: 曹鑒燎
- Simplified Chinese: 曹鉴燎
Transcriptions
Standard Mandarin
- Hanyu Pinyin: Cáo Jiànliáo
Yue: Cantonese
- Jyutping: Cou^{4} Gaam^{3}-liu^{4}

Cao Jianliao (born November 1955) is a former Chinese politician from Guangdong province. Beginning in 2002, Cao served successively as the Communist Party Secretary of Guangzhou's Tianhe District, Haizhu District, and Zengcheng District. He was promoted to the position of Vice Mayor of Guangzhou from 2012 to 2013. In December 2013 Cao was investigated for corruption related charges, and dismissed from office and expelled from the Communist Party in July 2014.

== Life ==
Cao was born and raised in Guangzhou, capital of Guangdong province.

He got involved in politics in July 1974 and joined the Chinese Communist Party in November 1974.

During the Cultural Revolution, Cao worked as a local officer in Guangzhou. In September 2006, Cao became the Deputy Secretary of Guangzhou municipality; he also served as the Vice chairman of the CPPCC Guangzhou Municipal Committee in January 2007. In July 2007, Cao was promoted to the Vice Mayor of Guangzhou; he was re-elected on January 11, 2012.

On December 19, 2013, Cao was being investigated by the Central Commission for Discipline Inspection for "serious violations of laws and regulations". Guandong's party disciplinary body reported that Cao had "inappropriate relationships" with some eleven women, and took bribes worth some 70 million yuan (~$11 million).

On July 11, 2014, Cao was removed from office and dismissed from the Party for serious corruption-related offenses; his case was forwarded to prosecution authorities for a criminal investigation.

On May 13, 2016, he pleaded guilty to bribery during his first trial at Guangzhou Intermediate People's Court in Guangdong province. He took advantage of various positions he held between 1995 and 2014, including deputy party secretary of Guangdong Provincial Public Security, to help certain organizations and individuals obtain land, provide assistance for others to handle police officer's license, employee's license, armed police vehicle driver's license, and delete criminal records for others. In return, he accepted money and property worth over 85.46 million yuan (~$12.42 million).

On April 14, 2017, Cao was sentenced to life in prison for taking bribes worth 85.46 million yuan (~$12.42 million) by the Intermediate People's Court in Shenzhen.
