= Feng Zhonghua =

Chinese politician

- 冯忠华

Party Secretary of Guangzhou
- Incumbent
- Assumed office 24 December 2025
- Deputy: Sun Zhiyang
- Preceded by: Guo Yonghang

Head of the Organization Department of the Guangdong Provincial Committee of the Chinese Communist Party
- In office 17 June 2024 – 11 June 2026
- Preceded by: Cheng Fubo
- Succeeded by: Hu Fan

Personal details
- Born: May 1970 (age 56) Dandong, Liaoning, China
- Party: Chinese Communist Party
- Education: Hefei University of Technology; Tsinghua University

Feng Zhonghua (Chinese: 冯忠华; pinyin: Féng Zhōnghuá; born May 1970) is a Chinese politician who currently serves as the deputy party secretary of Guangdong since November 2026 and Party Secretary of Guangzhou since December 2025. Previously he was served as the head of the Organization Department of the CCP Guangdong Provincial Committee from June 2024 to June 2026.

== Biography ==
Feng was born in Dandong, Liaoning. He graduated from Hefei University of Technology, where he majored in resources and environmental sciences and environmental engineering. Feng served in the Ministry of Construction (which was reorganized as the Ministry of Housing and Urban–Rural Development in 2008) for a long time. In 2015, he was appointed as the director of the Science and Technology Development Center (Residential Industrialization Promotion Center) of the Ministry of Housing and Urban-Rural Development. In 2016, he was transferred to the position of director-general of the Department of Urban and Rural Planning of the Ministry of Housing and Urban-Rural Development. In 2007, he graduated from the School of Architecture of Tsinghua University, which earned him a Master of Engineering degree.

In February 2018, Feng was appointed a delegate to the 13th National People's Congress. He was also appointed as the standing member of the Standing Committee of the 13th National People's Congress and the member of the Agriculture and Rural Affairs Committee of the National People's Congress. In June 2019, Feng was appointed as the vice governor of Hainan. He was appointed as a standing member and the head of the Organization Department of the Standing Committee of the Hainan Provincial Committee of the Chinese Communist Party in April 2022.

In June 2024, Feng was transferred to Guangdong, and he was appointed as a standing member and the head of the Organization Department of the Standing Committee of the Guangdong Provincial Committee of the Chinese Communist Party. In December 2025, he was appointed as the Party Secretary of Guangzhou, succeeding Guo Yonghang. On 12 November 2026, Feng was appointed as the deputy party secretary of Guangdong.

Party political offices
Preceded by Guo Yonghang	Party Secretary of Guangzhou; 2025–	Incumbent
Preceded by Cheng Fubo	Head of the Organization Department of the Guangdong Provincial Committee of the Chinese Communist Party; 2024–	Succeeded by Hu Fan
Preceded by Xu Qifang	Head of the Organization Department of the Hainan Provincial Committee of the Chinese Communist Party; 2022–2024	Succeeded by Na Yunde
