= Liu Tianfu =

Former Governor of Guangdong

- 刘田夫

Governor of Guangdong
- In office March 1981 – April 1983
- Preceded by: Xi Zhongxun
- Succeeded by: Liang Lingguang

Personal details
- Born: October 1908 Guang'an, Sichuan, Qing dynasty
- Died: 21 April 2002 (aged 93) Guangzhou, Guangdong, China
- Party: Chinese Communist Party

Chinese name
- Traditional Chinese: 劉田夫
- Simplified Chinese: 刘田夫
Transcriptions
Standard Mandarin
- Hanyu Pinyin: Liú Tiánfū
- Wade–Giles: Liu T'ien-fu

Liu Tianfu (Chinese: 刘田夫; October 1908 – 21 April 2002) was a Chinese Communist revolutionary and politician. He was a leader of the East River Column, an anti-Japanese guerrilla force in Guangdong during the Second Sino-Japanese War. From 1981 to 1983 he served as Governor of Guangdong, where he was a strong supporter of economic reform and worked to exonerate Guangdong cadres who had been unjustly punished during the "anti-localism movement" in the 1950s.

== Early life and wartime career ==
Liu was born in Guang'an, Sichuan, in October 1908, during the late Qing dynasty. He joined the Communist Youth League of China in 1934, and participated in anti-Japanese movement in Shanghai. In December 1935, he was arrested by the Kuomintang government for his activities.

After Japan launched a full-scale attack on Shanghai in August 1937 at the beginning of the Second Sino-Japanese War, Liu was released and enlisted in the 8th Group Army of the National Revolutionary Army to fight in the war. In May 1939, Liu transferred to Guangdong province, where he helped organize Communist guerrillas to fight the Japanese. He served as Political Commissar of the Guangdong People's Anti-Japanese Guerrillas, also known as the East River Column, commanded by Zeng Sheng.

After the surrender of Japan in 1945, the East River Column moved north to Shandong, and was reorganized as the Liangguang (Guangdong-Guangxi) Column of the Chinese Communist Party's Third Field Army. Liu served as Deputy Director of the Political Department of the Liangguang Column. During the Chinese Civil War, Liu fought in major battles including the Battle of East Henan, the Battle of Jinan, and the Huaihai campaign. In September 1949, he moved with the Liangguang Column back south to participate in the battle for Guangdong.

== People's Republic of China ==
After the founding of the People's Republic of China in October 1949, Liu was appointed Party Chief of Gaozhou-Leizhou prefecture, and organized logistical support for the Battle of Hainan Island. He worked in economic development of Guangdong province after 1956.

Liu served as Secretary of Guangdong Provincial Party Committee from 1960 to 1965, as well as Vice Governor of Guangdong from 1963 to 1965. After the Cultural Revolution, when Governor Xi Zhongxun was transferred to Beijing in November 1980, he appointed Liu, then 72 years old, as his successor.

As governor, Liu advocated the cause of the Guangdong cadres who had suffered during the "anti-localism movement" in the 1950s. As an outsider who had worked for four decades in the province, he proclaimed that there were no anti-outsider sentiments among native Cantonese cadres. Without explicitly naming him, he blamed Tao Zhu for the unfair treatment of the Cantonese. Partly due to intervention from Liu and Hu Yaobang, the Central Committee of the Chinese Communist Party set up a special committee to reinvestigate the matter. In 1994, the committee exonerated the victimized Guangdong cadres, especially their leader Fang Fang, who had died in prison during the Cultural Revolution.

Liu was a stalwart supporter of economic reforms and Guangdong's local interests. However, he only served as governor for two years due to his advanced age. He was replaced by Liang Lingguang in 1983, and became a member of the Central Advisory Commission. Liu and his successors Liang and Ye Xuanping were all considered reform pioneers who propelled the economic development of Guangdong in the 1980s.

Liu was a member of the 12th and 13th National Congress of the Chinese Communist Party. He was also a delegate to the 5th National People's Congress.

Liu died on 21 April 2002 in Guangzhou, aged 93.
