= Mayor of Guangzhou =

Mayor of the Guangzhou Municipal People's Government
- 广州市人民政府市长
- National Emblem of China

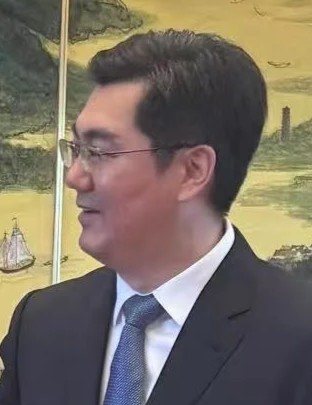
- Incumbent; Sun Zhiyang since October 9, 2023
- Guangzhou Municipal People's Government
- Type: Head of government
- Reports to: Guangzhou Municipal People's Congress and its Standing Committee
- Appointer: Guangzhou Municipal People's Congress
- Term length: Five years, renewable
- Deputy: Deputy Mayors

Mayor of Guangzhou
- Traditional Chinese: 廣州市市長
- Simplified Chinese: 广州市市长
Transcriptions
Standard Mandarin
- Hanyu Pinyin: Guǎng Zhōu Shì Shì Zhǎng

The mayor of Guangzhou, officially the Mayor of the Guangzhou Municipal People's Government, is the head of the Guangzhou Municipal People's Government. The mayor generally serves as the deputy secretary of the Guangzhou Municipal Committee of the Chinese Communist Party, and is the second-highest ranking official in the city after the secretary of the CCP Guangzhou Committee.

== Republic of China ==
Kuomintang Nanjing regime—Kuomintang

=== Mayors ===
No.	Name	Term of office	
No.	Name	Took office	Left office
1	Sun Fo	15 February 1921	July 1922
2	Wu Fei (吳飛)	July 1922	December 1922
3	Jin Zhang (金章)	December 1922	8 February 1923
4	Lin Yungai	8 February 1923	26 February 1923
5	Sun Fo _{2}	26 February 1923	September 1924
6	Li Fulin (李福林)	September 1924	July 1925
City Council Chairperson			
1	Wu Chaoshu	July 1925	June 1926
2	Sun Fo _{3}	June 1926	May 1927
3	Lin Yungai _{2}	May 1927	November 1927
4	Kan Nai-kuang (甘乃光)	November 1927	May 1928
Mayor			
7	Lin Yungai _{3}	May 1928	June 1931
8	Cheng Tiangu (程天固)	June 1931	March 1932
9	Liu Jiwen	March 1932	August 1936
10	Zeng Yangfu	August 1936	21 October 1938
(11)	Peng Dongyuan (彭東原)	21 October 1938	October 1941
(12)	Guan Zhongyi (關仲義)	October 1941	October 1941 (days unknown)
(13)	Zhou Huaren	October 1941	June 1942
(14)	Chen Yaozu (陳耀祖)	June 1942	1942
(15)	Zhou Yingxiang (周應湘)	1942	February 1943
(16)	Wang Qi (汪屺)	February 1943	1944
(17)	Cheung Cheuk Kwan (張焯堃)	1944	September 1945
11	Chan Chak	September 1945	June 1946
12	Ouyang Ju (欧阳驹)	June 1946	6 October 1949
13	Li Yangjing (李扬敬)	6 October 1949	13 October 1949

== People's Republic of China ==
=== Mayors ===
No.	Name	Term of office	
No.	Name	Took office	Left office
1	Ye Jianying	28 October 1949	December 1952
2	He Wei (何伟)	December 1952	November 1956
3	Zhu Guang (朱光)	November 1956	November 1960
4	Zeng Sheng	November 1960	15 March 1967
Chairman of Guangzhou Revolutionary Committee			
5(1)	Huang Ronghai (黄荣海)	15 March 1967	December 1972
6(2)	Jiao Linyi (焦林义)	December 1972	March 1979
7(3)	Yang Shangkun	March 1979	September 1981
Mayor			
8	Liang Lingguang	September 1981	July 1983
9	Ye Xuanping	July 1983	August 1985
10	Zhu Senlin	August 1985	June 1988
11	Yang Ziyuan	June 1988	7 June 1989
12	Li Ziliu	7 June 1989	1996
13	Lin Shusen	1996	April 2003
14	Zhang Guangning	April 2003	16 April 2010
15	Wan Qingliang	16 April 2010	20 December 2011
16	Chen Jianhua	20 December 2011	26 January 2016
17	Wen Guohui	26 January 2016	3 December 2021
18	Guo Yonghang	3 December 2021	9 October 2023
19	Sun Zhiyang	9 October 2023	Incumbent

== See also ==
- Timeline of Guangzhou
- Mayor of Beijing
- Mayor of Chongqing
- Mayor of Shanghai
- Mayor of Tianjin
