= Lin Yungai =

Chinese politician

- 林雲陔
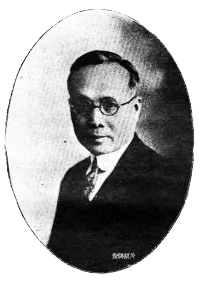

Auditor-General of the Republic of China
- In office August 1936 – 4 October 1948
- Preceded by: Chen Zhisuo
- Succeeded by: Zhang Chengyou

Minister of the Mongolian and Tibetan Affairs Commission
- In office 29 July 1936 – 8 August 1936
- Preceded by: Huang Musong
- Succeeded by: Wu Zhongxin

Vice Chairman of the Guangdong Provincial Government
- In office May 1931 – July 1936
- Chairman: Chen Jitang; Lin Yizhong
- Preceded by: Chen Mingshu
- Succeeded by: Huang Musong

Mayor of Guangzhou
- In office May 1928 – June 1931
- Preceded by: Gan Naiguang as Chairman of the Guangzhou City Council
- Succeeded by: Cheng Tiangu
- In office 8 February 1923 – 26 February 1923
- Preceded by: Jin Zhang
- Succeeded by: Sun Fo

Chairman of the Guangzhou City Council
- In office May 1927 – November 1927
- Preceded by: Sun Fo
- Succeeded by: Gan Naiguang

Personal details
- Born: 2 February 1881 Xinyi, Guangdong, China
- Died: 4 October 1948 (aged 67)
- Party: Kuomintang

Lin Yungai (simplified Chinese: 林云陔; traditional Chinese: 林雲陔; 2 February 1881 – 4 October 1948) was a Chinese politician also known as Gongjing (公競) or by the courtesy name Yigong (毅公).

== Career ==
Lin received his early education at a school in Gaozhou. In 1909, he began attending a school in Guangzhou. He joined the Tongmenghui while still a student. In Guangzhou, Lin met Zhu Zhixin and participated in the Yellow Flower Mound Uprising of 1911. The next year, he graduated and took part in a Gaozhou based revolt.

Lin pursued further study in law and politics at St. John's University in New York City, returning to China in 1918. Throughout the 1920s, Lin held several government posts in Guangdong. He was first named Mayor of Guangzhou in 1923, and later served as Chairman of the Guangzhou City Council in 1927, before assuming the mayoralty for a second time between 1928 and 1931. Lin then served as Vice Chairman of the Guangdong Provincial Government under Chen Jitang and Lin Yizhong between 1931 and 1936. He succeeded Huang Musong as minister of the Mongolian and Tibetan Affairs Commission later that year, but was shortly thereafter named auditor-general of the Republic of China. Lin held the post until his death on 4 October 1948.
