= Yang Ziyuan =

Chinese politician (1928–2018)

- 杨资元

11th Mayor of Guangzhou
- In office 1988–1990
- Preceded by: Zhu Senlin
- Succeeded by: Li Ziliu

Personal details
- Born: April 1928 British Hong Kong
- Died: October 27, 2018 (aged 90) Guangzhou, China
- Education: Sun Yat-sen University

Chinese name
- Traditional Chinese: 楊資元
- Simplified Chinese: 杨资元
Transcriptions
Standard Mandarin
- Hanyu Pinyin: Yáng Zīyuán
- Wade–Giles: Yang Tzu-yüan

Yang Ziyuan (Chinese: 杨资元; April 1928 – 27 October 2018) was a Chinese politician who served as Mayor of Guangzhou, the capital of Guangdong Province, from 1988 to 1990.

== Biography ==
Yang was born in British Hong Kong in April 1928, with his ancestral home in Meizhou, Guangdong, China. During World War II, he sought refuge in Meizhou, and later in Sichuan Province, where he attended school. After the surrender of Japan, he went to Guangzhou in 1946 to attend Sun Yat-sen University, where he joined the underground Communist youth association.

After the founding of the People's Republic of China in 1949, he worked in the government of Guangzhou as well as Guangzhou Iron and Steel Company, and later became head of the Guangzhou Alloy Steel Factory. He was appointed Vice Mayor of Guangzhou in 1985, and promoted to Mayor in June 1988, when he was 60. He served as mayor for two years, and became Chairman of the Guangzhou CPPCC in 1991.

Yang died on 27 October 2018 in Guangzhou, at the age of 90.
