= Liang Lingguang =

Chinese politician (1916–2006)

- 梁灵光

Governor of Guangdong
- In office April 1983 – August 1985
- Preceded by: Liu Tianfu
- Succeeded by: Ye Xuanping

Mayor of Guangzhou
- In office September 1980 – July 1983
- Preceded by: Yang Shangkun
- Succeeded by: Ye Xuanping

Personal details
- Born: November 1916 Yongchun County, Fujian, China
- Died: 25 February 2006 (aged 89) Guangzhou, Guangdong, China
- Party: Chinese Communist Party

Military service
- Commands: Chief of Staff, 29th Corps
- Battles/wars: Second World War; Second Sino-Japanese War; Chinese Civil War; Battle of Huangqiao; Huaihai Campaign; Yangtze River Crossing Campaign; Shanghai Campaign; Capture of Fuzhou; Capture of Xiamen; Battle of Guningtou

Chinese name
- Traditional Chinese: 梁靈光
- Simplified Chinese: 梁灵光
Transcriptions
Standard Mandarin
- Hanyu Pinyin: Liáng Língguāng
- Wade–Giles: Liang Ling-kuang
Yue: Cantonese
- Jyutping: Loeng^{4} Ling^{4}-gwong^{1}
Southern Min
- Hokkien POJ: Niû Lêng-kong

Liang Lingguang (Chinese: 梁灵光; Wade–Giles: Liang Ling-kuang; November 1916 – 25 February 2006) was a Chinese Communist revolutionary and politician. An anti-Japanese activist in the 1930s, he led a guerrilla force in Central Jiangsu under the New Fourth Army during the Second Sino-Japanese War, and rose to Chief of Staff of the 29th Corps of the People's Liberation Army during the Chinese Civil War.

After the founding of the People's Republic of China in 1949, Liang served as the first Mayor of Xiamen, Vice Governor of Fujian, and later Minister of Light Industry (1977–1980). During the reform and opening era, he was transferred to Guangdong province, where he served as Mayor of Guangzhou (1980–1983), Governor of Guangdong (1983–1985), and President of Jinan University (1983–1985). He was one of the pioneering reformist leaders who propelled Guangdong's economic rise in the 1980s.

== Early life ==
Liang was born in November 1916 in Wufeng Town (吾峰镇), Yongchun County, Fujian, Republic of China. His father, a merchant, died when he was young. His older brother Liang Piyun (梁披云), who had studied in Japan, brought him to Shanghai to study at Lida School (立达学园).

== Anti-Japanese activism ==
When the Empire of Japan occupied Northeast China in 1931 following the Mukden Incident, Liang participated in anti-Japanese activities organized by the underground Chinese Communist Party (CCP), and was expelled by his high school. He moved to Xiamen, Fujian, where he worked as an editor at the magazine Pinghua (平话) and published articles condemning Japanese aggression.

After Pinghua was shut down by the Kuomintang government, Liang returned to Shanghai to continue his education, and lived at the off-campus dorm of Jinan University, then located in Zhenru in the outskirts of Shanghai. In 1935, when the December 9th Movement broke out in Beijing against Japanese encroachment in North China, Liang joined Jinan students to petition the Kuomintang government in Nanjing to actively resist Japanese aggression. On the train to Nanjing, he met fellow petitioner Zhu Hanzhang (朱含章), a Jinan University student who later became his wife.

In the summer of 1936, Liang moved to Kuala Lumpur, British Malaya. There he taught at Zunkong Middle School (尊孔中学) founded by his brother Piyun, and organized anti-Japanese groups such as the Selangor Anti-Imperialism Union under the guidance of the Malayan Communist Party.

== Wartime career ==
When Japan launched its full-scale invasion of China in July 1937, Liang returned to China to join the resistance. He enlisted in the New Fourth Army and fought in the guerrilla war in northern Jiangsu province. In 1940, he was appointed the county magistrate of Rugao and joined the CCP. He was later appointed county magistrate of Nantong and fought many battles against the forces of Japan and the puppet Wang Jingwei regime, even temporarily taking over the Japanese-occupied county seat of Haimen.

During the Chinese Civil War which broke out after the surrender of Japan, Liang served as Commander of the 33rd Brigade of the East China Field Army and Chief of Staff of the 29th Corps of the People's Liberation Army. He fought in major battles including the Battle of Huangqiao, the Huaihai campaign, the Yangtze River Crossing Campaign, the Shanghai Campaign, and the Capture of Fuzhou.

== People's Republic of China ==
After the founding of the People's Republic of China in 1949, Liang was appointed the first Mayor of Xiamen, Fujian, and worked to restore industrial production after the end of the civil war. In March 1956, he became Vice Governor of Fujian and a member of its provincial party standing committee. He was dismissed during the Cultural Revolution, but was restored to the party standing committee in early 1975, and appointed deputy director of the Provincial Revolutionary Committee. In November 1977, Liang was transferred to the national government to serve as Minister of Light Industry.

=== Guangdong Province ===
In November 1980, at the beginning of the reform and opening era, Liang was transferred to Guangdong together with Ren Zhongyi, to replace Xi Zhongxun and Yang Shangkun, who had been transferred to Beijing. Liang served as First Party Secretary and Mayor of Guangzhou, the provincial capital, while Ren was appointed the provincial Party Chief. In March 1983, Liang was promoted to Governor of Guangdong, succeeding Liu Tianfu. He concurrently served as President of Jinan University, which had been reestablished in Guangzhou. He stepped down as governor in July 1985 and was succeeded by Ye Xuanping. Ren, Liu, Liang, and Ye were all considered reform pioneers who propelled the economic development of Guangdong in the 1980s.

From 1985 to 1988, Liang served as Director of the Guangdong Provincial Advisory Commission, and concurrently as the first chairman of China Travel Service Group Corporation (CTS) of Hong Kong. In May 1988, he was elected a member of the Standing Committee of the 7th National People's Congress and served as Vice Director of the Overseas Chinese Affairs Committee of the NPC.

Liang was a member of the 12th Central Committee of the Chinese Communist Party, and a member of the 2nd, 5th, 6th, and 7th National People's Congresses.

Liang died on 25 February 2006 in Guangzhou, aged 89.
