= Betty Wei =

Chinese-born American scientist and educator (1930–2024)

Betty Peh t'i Wei
- Chinese: 魏白蒂
- Hanyu Pinyin: Wèi Báidì
Transcriptions
Standard Mandarin
- Hanyu Pinyin: Wèi Báidì
- Wade–Giles: Wei Peh-t'i

Betty Wei (Traditional Chinese: 魏白蒂; July 25, 1930 – November 4, 2024) was a Chinese-born American historian and writer.

== Life and career ==
Born in Nanjing, China, to Hsioh-ren Wei, a Chinese scientist, educator and diplomat, Wei moved to New York City at the age of 16. She was the first Asian student to study at the Chapin School.

Wei had a bachelor's degree in Political Science from Bryn Mawr College and a master's degree in International Relations and Law from New York University.

In 1975, she moved to Hong Kong with her husband and later went to pursue a doctorate degree in Modern Chinese History at the University of Hong Kong. She served as the Head of Liberal Arts and Interdisciplinary Studies at the Hong Kong Academy for Performing Arts from 1994 until her retirement in 2003. She was later an Honorary Research Fellow at the Centre of Asian Studies at the University of Hong Kong, Honorary Professor at the Institute of Qing History, Renmin University of China and a member of the Royal Asiatic Society Hong Kong Branch.

Wei died in Westford, Massachusetts, on November 4, 2024, at the age of 94.

== Publications ==
- Shanghai: Crucible of Modern China (New York: Oxford University Press, 1987)
- Old Shanghai (New York: Oxford University Press, 1993)
- Liu Chi-Wen: biography of a revolutionary leader (Hong Kong: The Liu Chi-Wen Family, 2005)
- Ruan Yuan, 1764-1849: The Life And Work of a Major Scholar-official in Nineteenth Century China Before the Opium War (Hong Kong: Hong Kong University Press, 2006)
