= Yu Yongbo =

Chinese politician

- 于永波
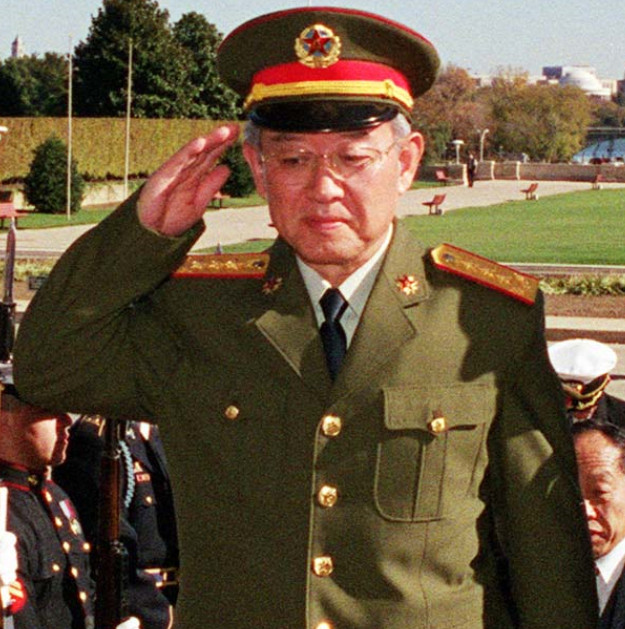
- Yu in 2000 in the United States

Head of the People's Liberation Army General Political Department
- In office November 1992 – November 2002
- Preceded by: Yang Baibing
- Succeeded by: Xu Caihou

Personal details
- Born: September 1931 (age 94) Fu County, Liaoning, China
- Party: Chinese Communist Party

Military service
- Allegiance: People's Republic of China
- Branch/service: People's Liberation Army Ground Force
- Years of service: 1947–2003
- Rank: General
- Unit: Fourth Field Army; 42nd Army
- Commands: Guangzhou Military Region; Nanjing Military Region
- Battles/wars: Chinese Civil War; Korean War
- Awards: Order of Liberation (1960)

Yu Yongbo (Chinese: 于永波; pinyin: Yú Yǒngbō; born September 1931) is a general in the People's Liberation Army of China who served as head of the People's Liberation Army General Political Department from 1992 to 2002. He was a member of the 13th, 14th, and 15th Central Committee of the Chinese Communist Party. He was a delegate to the 8th and 9th National People's Congress.

== Biography ==
Yu was born into a Manchu family in Fu County (now Wafangdian), Liaoning, in September 1931. He enlisted in the Northeast People's Liberation Army in September 1947, and joined the Chinese Communist Party (CCP) in September 1948. He served in the Fourth Field Army and participated in the Liaoshen campaign, Pingjin campaign, and Southwest China campaign.

In December 1950, he was assigned to North Korea to support the Chinese People's Volunteer Army during the Korean War. He returned to China in November 1952 and served in the 42nd Army of the PLA Ground Force for a long time.

He became director of the Headquarters Office of Guangzhou Military Region in December 1978, and served until May 1983, when he was appointed political commissar of the 42nd Army. In June 1985, he was transferred to Nanjing Military Region and appointed director of Political Department. In November 1989, he became deputy head of the People's Liberation Army General Political Department, rising to head in October 1992. He also served as deputy leader of the Demobilized Army Cadre Emplacement Leading Group of the State Council and the National Crack Down Smuggling Leading Group (全国打击走私领导小组) since 1993. He retired in March 2003.

He was promoted to the rank of lieutenant general (zhongjiang) in 1988, and general (shangjiang) in 1993.

== Awards ==
- 1960 Order of Liberation

Military offices
Preceded by Wei Jinshan	Director of Political Department of the Nanjing Military Region; 1985–1989	Succeeded by Lan Baojing
Preceded by Yang Baibing	Head of the People's Liberation Army General Political Department; 1992–2002	Succeeded by Xu Caihou
