= Wen Guohui =

Chinese politician

- 温国辉

17th Mayor of Guangzhou
- In office 26 January 2016 – 3 December 2021
- Preceded by: Chen Jianhua
- Succeeded by: Guo Yonghang

Personal details
- Born: October 1963 (age 62–63) Jiexi County, Guangdong
- Party: Chinese Communist Party (1984-)
- Education: South China University of Technology; University of California, Los Angeles
- Occupation: Politician

Wen Guohui
- Simplified Chinese: 温国辉
- Traditional Chinese: 溫國輝
Transcriptions
Standard Mandarin
- Hanyu Pinyin: Wēn Guóhuī
Hakka
- Romanization: Vun^{1} Guêd^{5}-fi^{1}
Yue: Cantonese
- Jyutping: Wan^{1} Gwok^{3}-fai^{1}
Southern Min
- Hokkien POJ: Un Kok-hui
- Teochew Peng'im: Ung^{1} Gog^{4}-hui^{1}

Wen Guohui (Chinese: 温国辉; pinyin: Wēn Guóhuī; born September 1963) is a Chinese politician who was the mayor of Guangzhou from 2016 to 2021.

== Biography ==
Wen was born in Jiexi County, Guangdong. He joined the Chinese Communist Party in 1984 and entered South China University of Technology in 1987. In 2001 he served as deputy director of Economic and Trading Committee of Guangdong and director of the State Assets Committee of Guangdong in 2009. Wen was elected the CCP Secretary of Shanwei and Chairman of the Standing Committee of the Shanwei People's Congress. In 2015 he became the Vice-Governor of Guangdong. On 26 January 2016, Wen Guohui was elected the Mayor of Guangzhou.

Political offices
| Preceded by Chen Jianhua | Mayor of Guangzhou; 2016 – 2021 | Succeeded by Guo Yonghang |
