= Wan Qingliang =

Chinese politician

Wan Qingliang 万庆良

Party Secretary of Guangzhou
- In office 20 December 2011 – 27 June 2014
- Preceded by: Zhang Guangning
- Succeeded by: Ren Xuefeng

Mayor of Guangzhou
- In office 16 April 2010 – 20 December 2011
- Preceded by: Zhang Guangning
- Succeeded by: Chen Jianhua

Personal details
- Born: February 12, 1964 (age 62) Wuhua County, Guangdong
- Party: Chinese Communist Party (1986–2014, expelled)
- Criminal information
- Criminal charges: bribery
- Penalty: Life imprisonment

Wan Qingliang (simplified Chinese: 万庆良; traditional Chinese: 萬慶良; pinyin: Wàn Qìngliáng; Cantonese: Maan Hing Loeng, born February 12, 1964) is a former Chinese politician from Guangdong province. He served as the mayor of Guangzhou, one of China's most populous cities, from 2010 to 2011, and was then promoted to Party Secretary, the top official of the city. In June 2014, the Communist Party's anti-corruption agency announced that Wan was held for investigation. Wan was expelled from Chinese Communist Party on October 9, 2014. He was convicted on criminal charges related to taking over 100 million yuan in bribes, and sentenced to life in prison.

== Career ==
Wan was born in a village in Wuhua County, Guangdong to a family of farmers, the second of two children; his sister was eight years his senior and used her savings to support his education. Wan took the surname of his mother. Wan walked five kilometers to a neighbouring town to attend high school. He did poorly on his first attempt at the gaokao exam and continued informal schooling, eventually earning an admission to Jiaying Teacher's College (now Jiaying University). In college Wan edited various campus magazines. After graduation Wan stayed at his alma mater as a lecturer. He met his wife at the college and they had a son. In 1986, he entered the party Publicity Department in Meizhou, beginning his career in politics. In 1998 he became party chief of Jiaoling County. In 2000, he was promoted to head the provincial Communist Youth League organization.

In 2008, he was Vice Governor of Guangdong Province and was part of a group working to convert the Pearl River Delta region into a "core region of modern manufacturing" to replace older factories that had been closing. He signed an agreement with ASEAN, which CCTV.com said was designed to "explore and facilitate cooperation activities in various areas including agriculture, information and communication technology, trade and investment, tourism promotion, energy and environment, education and public health."

Representing Guangdong province, he signed an agreement to expand University of Macao on Guangdong's Hengqin Island, but under the jurisdiction of the Macao Special Administrative Region.

He was head of Guangdong province's participation in the 2010 World Expo. In November 2010, Wan was elected as vice president of the United Cities and Local Governments (UCLG).

In 2011, Wan told the media that he "after working for twenty years, I have yet to buy a home. I pay rent of 600 yuan a month for a 130 square meter flat in the Zhujiang Jingdi community." Wan was widely ridiculed for this incident, as it was later revealed that a similar sized home in that very neighbourhood cost at least 4,000 yuan a month to rent. The incident earned Wan the nickname "emperor of the six hundred" online.

== Investigation ==
In 2013, a large number of Wan's associates and subordinates were detained for investigation, including vice-mayor Cao Jianliao. On June 26, 2014, Wan appeared in a "mass line" discussion conference, emphasizing, "when you engage in self-criticism, be daring, criticize yourself, criticize each other, don't be afraid." On June 27, Wan was attending a meeting at the provincial government when he was suddenly taken away by investigators. Plans for his scheduled visit to Guangzhou University were scrapped. Wan was the third alternate member of Central Committee to be investigated for abuses since the 18th Party Congress. On June 30, Wan was dismissed from his posts as a member of the provincial Party Standing Committee and party chief of Guangzhou.

On October 9, 2014, Wan was expelled from the Chinese Communist Party following an internal investigation. The investigations led to criminal charges of bribery. The Central Commission for Discipline Inspection said that Wan sought benefits for others through abuse of power, solicited and accepted large bribes, violated the "Eight-point Regulation", and often frequented private clubs. It was reported that the club he frequented in the Baiyun Mountain was closed by the authorities. At the fourth plenum of the 18th Central Committee held on October 23, the full Central Committee ratified Wan's expulsion from the body and the party itself.

Wan was put on trial in Nanning in neighbouring Guangxi. During the trial, the prosecution accused Wan of taking some 111.25 million yuan (~$16.5 million) in bribes personally or through an associate, in exchange for political favours or promotions. Wan Qingliang was sentenced to life in prison on September 30, 2016.
