= Yang Baibing =

Chinese military officer

- 杨白冰
- Yang Baibing

Secretary-General of the Central Military Commission of the Chinese Communist Party
- In office November 1989 – October 1992
- Preceded by: Yang Shangkun
- Succeeded by: Position revoked

Director of the People's Liberation Army General Political Department
- In office November 1987 – October 1992
- Preceded by: Yu Qiuli
- Succeeded by: Yu Yongbo

Political Commissar of the Beijing Military Region
- In office June 1985 – November 1987
- Preceded by: Fu Chongbi
- Succeeded by: Liu Zhenhua

Personal details
- Born: Yang Shangzheng; 9 September 1920 Tongnan, Chongqing, China
- Died: 15 January 2013 (aged 92) Beijing, China
- Party: Chinese Communist Party
- Relatives: Yang Shangkun
- Education: Counter-Japanese Military and Political University

Military service
- Allegiance: People's Republic of China
- Branch/service: Eighth Route Army; People's Liberation Army Ground Force
- Years of service: 1938–1993
- Rank: General
- Battles/wars: Second Sino-Japanese War; Chinese Civil War
- Awards: Order of Independence and Freedom (3rd Class; 1955); Order of Liberation (2nd Class; 1955)

Chinese name
- Simplified Chinese: 杨白冰
- Traditional Chinese: 楊白冰
Transcriptions
Standard Mandarin
- Hanyu Pinyin: Yáng Báibīng

Yang Shangzheng
- Simplified Chinese: 杨尚正
- Traditional Chinese: 楊尚正
Transcriptions
Standard Mandarin
- Hanyu Pinyin: Yáng Shàngzhèng

Yang Baibing (Chinese: 杨白冰; pinyin: Yáng Báibīng, 9 September 1920 – 15 January 2013) was a Chinese general and political commissar in the People's Liberation Army (PLA). The younger half-brother of Yang Shangkun, he served as director of the PLA General Political Department from 1987 to 1992 and as secretary-general of the Central Military Commission from 1989 to 1992. Together, the two brothers effectively controlled the PLA from the early 1980s until the early 1990s. He backed the military crackdown on the 1989 Tiananmen Square protests and later supported Deng Xiaoping's economic reforms, before Deng removed him from his military posts in 1992.

== Early life ==
Yang was born Yang Shangzheng on 9 September 1920 in Chongqing. He attended a junior middle school in Chengdu, where he began reading progressive publications and took part in student movements. In January 1938, he went to Yan'an, where he enrolled in the second class of the Shaanbei Public School and joined the Chinese Communist Party in March 1938. He then transferred to the Counter-Japanese Military and Political University, from which he graduated in December 1938.

== Military career ==
From 1939 to 1942, during the Second Sino-Japanese War, Yang held youth, mass work and organizational posts in the political department of the 129th Division of the Eighth Route Army. He took part in the Hundred Regiments Offensive and in the 1942 campaign against Japanese "mopping-up" operations in the Taihang Mountains. In November 1943, he entered the Central Party School in Yan'an, and in August 1944 he became a political assistant at the 129th Division's rear office in Yan'an.

During the Chinese Civil War, Yang served in the political department of the Shanxi–Hebei–Shandong–Henan Military Region and later in the Dabie Mountains, where he headed the organization department of Jingfu County and served as political commissar of a county guerrilla battalion. From September 1948, he worked in the political departments of the Central Plains Military Region and the Second Field Army, and he took part in the Huaihai campaign, the Yangtze River Crossing campaign and the Southwest campaign.

After the founding of the People's Republic of China in 1949, Yang served as head of the organization department in the political department of the Southwest Military Region's logistics department, and as deputy head of the region's youth department. In 1953, he went to Korea to observe units of the Chinese People's Volunteers. In June 1955, he became head of the organization department in the political department of the Chengdu Military Region. In 1958, he spent a year in the philosophy class of the Political College of the People's Liberation Army, and in October 1960 he became deputy director of the Chengdu Military Region's political department.

During the Cultural Revolution, Yang was persecuted, falsely accused of being a "counter-revolutionary", and held in detention for eight years. He returned to work after the Third Plenary Session of the 11th Central Committee in December 1978. In April 1979, he became deputy director of the political department of the Beijing Military Region, and in October 1982 he became its deputy political commissar. In June 1985, he was appointed political commissar of the Beijing Military Region.

=== Central Military Commission ===
In November 1987, Yang was appointed director of the PLA General Political Department, and in April 1988 he became a member of the Central Military Commission (CMC). He was awarded the rank of general in September 1988. From November 1989 to October 1992, he served as secretary-general of the CMC while remaining director of the General Political Department. He was also added to the Secretariat of the 13th Central Committee at its Fifth Plenary Session. The South China Morning Post described him as one of China's most powerful leaders after 1989, and wrote that the army referred to him and Yang Shangkun as the "Yang clan".

In the 1980s, Yang coordinated Chinese military assistance to the Afghan mujahideen fighting Soviet forces during the Soviet–Afghan War, and the aid eventually included heavy machine guns, rocket launchers and anti-aircraft artillery. After the dissolution of the Soviet Union, he was one of several senior Chinese officials who pushed for a strategic partnership with Russia in the early 1990s.

=== 1989 Tiananmen Square protests ===
During the 1989 protests, Yang, as director of the General Political Department, backed Deng Xiaoping's crackdown on the pro-democracy movement. The New York Times described him as the military strongman who led the violent suppression of the student-led protests, and reported that he carried out Deng's order to clear unarmed demonstrators from Tiananmen Square and mobilized the troops involved. According to the Hong Kong weekly Yazhou Zhoukan, a three-hour documentary made in 2004 by the party's publicity department for party members indicated that Yang had signed the order for the PLA to fire on unarmed students and workers. The scholar Nan Li wrote that both Yang brothers had been "overly active in the military suppression" of the demonstrations, and pointed to Yang Baibing's "post-Tiananmen militant rhetoric" as head of the General Political Department.

=== Support for reform and removal ===
After Deng's southern tour in early 1992, Yang supported Deng against conservatives who opposed further economic reforms. At the annual session of the National People's Congress in March 1992, he said that the army must act as a "protector and escort for China's reform", and that the army's regional leaders had visited Zhuhai and Shenzhen to "study and show our support for reform and opening".

In October 1992, Yang left his posts as secretary-general of the CMC and director of the General Political Department, and at the 14th Party Congress he became a member of the Politburo. Yang Shangkun was also eased out of his key posts, in what The Christian Science Monitor described as a power play led by Deng and senior professional military officers. Western and Chinese analysts said that the brothers were distrusted for allegedly trying to build an independent power base and for stressing communist ideology over military professionalism.

The Associated Press reported that Deng forced Yang into retirement because he feared the brothers were accumulating too much power, and that he purged Yang's supporters from the officer corps. The New York Times reported that Deng feared the brothers were trying to disrupt his succession plans, in what some analysts called a "mini coup", and that Jiang Zemin, Deng's chosen successor, probably helped bring about their downfall. Nan Li wrote that the two men might be suspected of developing a factional clique because they were relatives.

== Later life and death ==
In his later years, Yang reportedly sought a publisher for memoirs that justified the use of force in 1989, but the Hong Kong publisher Bao Pu said that party leaders had rejected the manuscript. Bao said, "Thanks to the Yang brothers, China's only military victory of the last 30 years involved cracking down on its own people."

Yang died of illness in Beijing on 15 January 2013, at the age of 92. The Central Committee described him as "a seasoned loyal Communist fighter and a proletarian revolutionist". His body was cremated at the Babaoshan Revolutionary Cemetery on 21 January 2013. Hu Jintao, Xi Jinping, Wu Bangguo, Wen Jiabao, Jia Qinglin, Li Keqiang and Liu Yunshan attended the farewell ceremony, while Jiang Zemin and other leaders visited him in hospital or sent condolences.

Military offices
Preceded by Fu Chongbi	Political Commissar of the Beijing Military Region; 1985–1987	Succeeded by Liu Zhenhua
Preceded by Yu Qiuli	Director of the People's Liberation Army General Political Department; 1987–1992	Succeeded by Yu Yongbo
Party political offices
Preceded by Yang Shangkun	Secretary-General of the Central Military Commission of the Chinese Communist Party; 1989–1992	Succeeded by Position revoked
