= Li Ziliu =

Chinese politician (1932–2022)

- 黎子流

12th Mayor of Guangzhou
- In office 1990–1996
- Preceded by: Yang Ziyuan
- Succeeded by: Lin Shusen

Member of the National People's Congress (7th & 8th)
- In office October 1988 – March 1998
- Constituency: Guangdong

Personal details
- Born: 4 January 1932 Shunde, Foshan, Guangdong, China
- Died: 25 December 2022 (aged 90) Guangzhou, Guangdong, China

Li Ziliu (Chinese: 黎子流; January 4, 1932 – December 25, 2022) was a Chinese politician who served as Mayor of Guangzhou from 1990 to 1996.

== Biography ==
Li was born in Shunde, Guangdong, Republic of China on January 4, 1932, to a peasant family and he studied for only two years in a primary school. He joined the Chinese Communist Party in 1953. During the Cultural Revolution between 1966 and 1969, he was listed as "rightist", tortured by the Red Guards and sent to prison for two years. In 1974, Li was appointed the Communist Party Secretary of Shunde County. In 1983, he was appointed as the party secretary of Jiangmen City. During his term of service, he drove the construction of the bridge linking Jiangmen and Zhongshan to improve the city's transportation network. In 1990, he was appointed mayor of Guangzhou. He facilitated the construction of highways to Baiyun Airport and the Guangzhou Metro during his term of service.

After his retirement in 1996, Li established an agricultural company called Shunde New Century Farm in Shunde. Hence, certain property developers such as Henderson Land, New World Development, Sino Group and Ka Wah Group, which are all Hong Kong-based companies invested in the business.

Lai died of cardiovascular disease on December 25, 2022, at the age of 90. Before his death, he was reported to have contracted COVID-19 on December 15.
