= Governor of Guangdong =

Governor of Chinese province

Governor of the Guangdong Provincial People's Government
- 广东省人民政府省长
- National Emblem of China

- Flag of China
- Incumbent; Meng Fanli since 11 October 2025
- Guangdong Provincial People's Government
- Type: Governor
- Status: Provincial and ministerial-level official
- Reports to: Guangdong Provincial People's Congress and its Standing Committee
- Nominator: Presidium of the Guangdong Provincial People's Congress
- Appointer: Guangdong Provincial People's Congress
- Term length: Five years, renewable
- Inaugural holder: Ye Jianying
- Formation: 6 November 1949
- Deputy: Deputy Governors; Secretary-General

The governor of Guangdong, officially the Governor of the Guangdong Provincial People's Government, is the head of Guangdong Province and leader of the Guangdong Provincial People's Government.

The governor is elected by the Guangdong Provincial People's Congress, and responsible to it and its Standing Committee. The governor is a provincial level official and is responsible for the overall decision-making of the provincial government. The governor is assisted by an executive vice governor as well as several vice governors. The governor generally serves as the deputy secretary of the Guangdong Provincial Committee of the Chinese Communist Party and as a member of the CCP Central Committee. The governor is the second highest-ranking official in the province after the secretary of the CCP Guangdong Committee. The current governor is Meng Fanli since 11 October 2025.

== List of governors ==
=== Republic of China ===
No.	Officeholder	Term of office	
No.	Officeholder	Took office	Left office
Governor of the Military Government of Guangdong Province
1	Hu Hanmin (1879–1936)	17 November 1911	12 December 1911
2	Chen Jiongming (1878–1933)	12 December 1911	25 April 1912
(1)	Hu Hanmin (1879–1936)	25 April 1912	4 June 1913
3	Chen Jiongming (1878–1933)	2 July 1913	3 August 1913
4	Long Jiguang (1867–1925)	3 August 1913	6 July 1916
Director of the Guangdong Civil Affairs Office
1	Hu Hanmin (1879–1936)	14 June 1913	14 June 1913
2	Chen Zhaochang (1867–1914)	Never took office	
3	Chen Jiongming (1878–1933)	14 June 1913	3 August 1913
4	Long Jiguang (1867–1925)	3 August 1913	13 September 1913
5	Li Kaiqian (1871–1929)	13 September 1913	26 May 1914
Guangdong Provincial Inspector General's Office
4	Li Guoyun (1878–?)	26 May 1914	3 July 1915
5	Zhang Mingqi (1875–1945)	3 July 1915	
6	Long Jiguang (1867–1925)	21 June 1916	6 July 1916
Governor of Guangdong Province
1	Zhu Qinglan (1874–1941)	6 July 1916	27 August 1917
2	Li Yaohan (1878–1942)	6 September 1917	22 September 1918
3	Zhai Wang (1877–1941)	22 September 1918	22 June 1919
–	Zhang Jinfang (1854–1921)	22 June 1919	29 May 1920
4	Yang Yongtai (1880–1936)	August 1957	27 October 1920
–	Wei Bangping (1884–1935)	27 October 1920	10 November 1920
5	Chen Jiongming (1878–1933)	10 November 1920	19 April 1922
6	Wu Ting-fang (1842–1922)	22 April 1922	21 June 1922
7	Wei Bangping (1884–1935)	21 June 1922	15 August 1922
8	Chun Chik-yu (1859–1936)	15 August 1922	19 January 1923
9	Hu Hanmin (1879–1936)	20 January 1923	22 February 1923
10	Xu Shaozhen (1861–1936)	22 February 1923	7 May 1923
11	Liao Zhongkai (1877–1925)	7 May 1923	23 February 1924
12	Yang Shukan (1881–1942)	23 February 1924	12 June 1924
(11)	Liao Zhongkai (1877–1925)	12 June 1924	29 August 1924
(9)	Hu Hanmin (1879–1936)	5 September 1924	3 July 1925
13	Xu Chongzhi (1887–1965)	3 July 1925	August 1925
14	Chen Shuren (1884–1948)	August 1925	10 November 1926
Chairman of the Guangdong Provincial Government
1	Sun Fo (1891–1973)	13 November 1926	7 December 1926
2	Li Jishen (1885–1959)	7 December 1926	3 July 1928
–	Feng Zhuwan (1879–1954)	3 July 1928	19 December 1928
3	Chen Mingshu (1889–1965)	19 December 1928	12 May 1931
4	Chen Jitang (1890–1954)	12 May 1931	3 May 1932
5	Lin Yizhong (1887–1984)	3 May 1932	29 July 1936
6	Huang Musong (1884–1937)	29 July 1936	March 1937
7	Wu Tiecheng (1893–1953)	March 1937	23 December 1938
8	Li Hanhun (1895–1987)	23 December 1938	31 August 1945

==== Japanese occupation ====
No.	Officeholder	Term of office	
No.	Officeholder	Took office	Left office
1	Peng Dongyuan (1882–1954)	21 October 1938	10 May 1940
2	Chen Yaozu (1892–1944)	10 May 1940	4 April 1944
–	Wang Qi (1896–1961)	4 April 1944	14 April 1944
3	Chen Chunpu (1900–1966)	14 April 1944	26 April 1945
4	Chu Minyi (1884–1946)	26 April 1945	31 August 1945

==== After World War II ====
No.	Officeholder	Term of office	
No.	Officeholder	Took office	Left office
–	Liu Yonggao (Note: Special Commissioner of the National Government)	31 August 1945	19 September 1945
1	Luo Zhuoying (1896–1961)	19 September 1945	3 October 1947
2	T. V. Soong (1894–1971)	3 October 1947	24 January 1949
3	Xue Yue (1896–1998)	24 January 1949	May 1950

=== People's Republic of China ===
No.	Officeholder	Term of office		Party	Ref.
No.	Officeholder	Took office	Left office	Party	Ref.
Governor of the Guangdong Provincial People's Government
1	Ye Jianying (1897–1986)	6 November 1949	September 1953	Chinese Communist Party	
2	Tao Zhu (1908–1969)	September 1953	February 1955	Chinese Communist Party	
Governor of the Guangdong Provincial People's Committee
(2)	Tao Zhu (1908–1969)	February 1955	August 1957	Chinese Communist Party	
3	Chen Yu (1901–1974)	August 1957	November 1967	Chinese Communist Party	
4	Huang Yongsheng (1910–1983)	November 1967	21 February 1968	Chinese Communist Party	
Director of the Guangdong Revolutionary Committee
(4)	Huang Yongsheng (1910–1983)	21 February 1968	June 1969	Chinese Communist Party	
5	Liu Xingyuan (1908–1990)	June 1969	April 1972	Chinese Communist Party	
6	Ding Sheng (1913–1999)	April 1972	April 1974	Chinese Communist Party	
7	Zhao Ziyang (1919–2005)	April 1974	October 1975	Chinese Communist Party	
8	Wei Guoqing (1913–1989)	October 1975	January 1979	Chinese Communist Party	
Governor of the Guangdong Provincial People's Government
9	Xi Zhongxun (1913–2002)	January 1979	March 1981	Chinese Communist Party	
10	Liu Tianfu (1908–2002)	March 1981	April 1983	Chinese Communist Party	
11	Liang Lingguang (1916–2006)	April 1983	August 1985	Chinese Communist Party	
12	Ye Xuanping (1924–2019)	August 1985	May 1991	Chinese Communist Party	
13	Zhu Senlin (1930–2026)	May 1991	9 February 1996	Chinese Communist Party	
14	Lu Ruihua (1938–2025)	10 February 1996	20 January 2003	Chinese Communist Party	
15	Huang Huahua (born 1946)	20 January 2003	4 November 2011	Chinese Communist Party	
16	Zhu Xiaodan (born 1953)	17 January 2012 (acting from 5 November 2011)	30 December 2016	Chinese Communist Party	
17	Ma Xingrui (born 1959)	23 January 2017 (acting from 30 December 2016)	27 December 2021	Chinese Communist Party	
18	Wang Weizhong (born 1962)	22 January 2022 (acting from 27 December 2021)	11 October 2025	Chinese Communist Party	
19	Meng Fanli (born 1965)	11 October 2025 (acting 11 October 2025)	Incumbent		
