= Huang Huahua =

Chinese politician

- 黄华华

Governor of Guangdong
- In office January 2003 – 5 November 2011
- Preceded by: Lu Ruihua
- Succeeded by: Zhu Xiaodan

Party Secretary of Guangzhou
- In office April 1998 – September 2002
- Preceded by: Gao Siren
- Succeeded by: Lin Shusen

Personal details
- Born: October 1946 (age 79) Xingning County, Guangdong, China
- Party: Chinese Communist Party

Chinese name
- Traditional Chinese: 黃華華
- Simplified Chinese: 黄华华
Transcriptions
Standard Mandarin
- Hanyu Pinyin: Huáng Huáhuá
Hakka
- Romanization: Vong^{2} Fa^{2}-fa^{2}
Yue: Cantonese
- Jyutping: Wong4 Waa4 Waa4

Huang Huahua (born October 1946 in Xingning, Guangdong) is a retired Chinese politician, and the Governor of Guangdong between 2003 and 2011. Of Hakka heritage, he was once the mayor of Meizhou.

== Biography ==
Huang was born in Xingning County, Guangdong. Huang graduated in mathematics from Sun Yat-sen University.

From 1970 to 1978, Huang worked at a machinery factory of the Guangdong Coal Mine, joined the Communist Party in 1971 and served as deputy secretary of the workshop Party Branch. He was later promoted to secretary of the Communist Youth League of China (CYLC) Shaoguan Municipal Committee.

Huang was deputy secretary of the CYLC provincial committee from 1982 to 1985 and then secretary of CYLC provincial committee from 1985 to 1987.

Prior to becoming mayor of Meixian, Huang served as deputy secretary of the CCP Meixian Prefectural Committee.

He was Mayor of Meizhou (1988–1992) and subsequently the CCP party chief in Guangzhou. In January 2003, Huang was made Governor of Guangdong.

The stepping down of Huang as governor in 2011 marked the end of the dominance of the provincial government by the "Hakka clique" (客家帮). In December 2011, Huang was made a deputy chair of the National People's Congress Overseas Chinese Affairs Committee.

Huang was an alternate member of the 15th Central Committee of the Chinese Communist Party, and a full member of the 16th and 17th Central Committees.

Preceded by Lu Ruihua	Governor of Guangdong; 2003–2011	Succeeded by Zhu Xiaodan
