= Ren Xuefeng =

Chinese politician and business executive (1965–2019)

- 任学锋

Deputy Party Secretary of Chongqing
- In office 17 October 2018 – 31 October 2019
- Preceded by: Tang Liangzhi
- Succeeded by: Wu Cunrong

Deputy Party Secretary of Guangdong
- In office 26 February 2017 – 17 October 2018
- Preceded by: Ma Xingrui
- Succeeded by: Wang Weizhong

Party Secretary of Guangzhou
- In office 27 August 2014 – 20 July 2018
- Preceded by: Wan Qingliang
- Succeeded by: Zhang Shuofu

Deputy Mayor of Tianjin
- In office 28 January 2008 – 27 August 2014
- Mayor: Huang Xingguo

Personal details
- Born: 26 October 1965 Xingtai, Hebei, China
- Died: 31 October 2019 (aged 54) Beijing, China
- Party: Chinese Communist Party
- Education: Hebei University of Technology; Nankai University

Ren Xuefeng (Chinese: 任学锋; pinyin: Rén Xuéfēng; 26 October 1965 – 31 October 2019) was a Chinese politician and business executive. Ren was an early leader of the Binhai New Area in Tianjin and served as the city's vice-mayor for eight years. He was transferred to Guangdong province in 2014, where he served as Party Secretary of Guangzhou and Deputy Party Secretary of Guangdong. He was appointed Deputy Party Secretary of Chongqing in October 2018, but died in office a year later at age 54.

== Early life and career in Tianjin ==
Ren Xuefeng was born on 26 October 1965 in Xingtai, Hebei, China. He joined the Chinese Communist Party in July 1985. He graduated from Hebei University of Technology in 1988 with a degree in organic chemical engineering. He later studied at Nankai University Business School on a part-time basis, earning a Doctor of Business Administration degree in 1998. He subsequently conducted postdoctoral research at the university from 1999 to 2001.

From 1995 to 2002, Ren was the chief executive of the Tianjin New Technology Industrial Park, the predecessor of Binhai New Area. From 2004 to 2008 he served as Vice-Chairman, then Chairman of Hong Kong Jinlian (Tsinlein) Group Co. Ltd., the de facto representative office of the Tianjin government in Hong Kong. He served as Vice Mayor of Tianjin from 2008 to 2014.

== Career in Guangdong and Chongqing ==
In August 2014, Ren was appointed Party Secretary of Guangzhou, the capital of Guangdong province. He replaced Wan Qingliang, who had been dismissed for corruption, and became the first person from outside Guangdong to serve as the top leader of its capital in 33 years. In February 2017, Ren was appointed Deputy Party Secretary of Guangdong. He left his post as party chief of Guangzhou in July 2018, after four years on the job.

Ren was transferred out of Guangdong in October 2018 and appointed Deputy Party Secretary of Chongqing municipality, the No. 3 official behind Party Secretary Chen Min'er and Mayor Tang Liangzhi. Although his new position was officially on the same level as his old one, it was generally viewed as a demotion as Chongqing is not as economically prosperous and strategically important as Guangdong.

Ren was an alternate member of the 18th and 19th Central Committees of the Chinese Communist Party.

== Death ==
On 24 October 2019, Ren met with Sylvain Laurent, the Asia-Pacific region CEO of the French software company Dassault Systèmes, in Chongqing. After the conclusion of the Fourth Plenum of the 19th Central Committee, Ren was unexpectedly absent from an important meeting of the Chongqing Party Committee on 1 November 2019. Two days later, government media in Chongqing reported that Ren had "recently died of an illness", aged 54. According to the Hong Kong newspaper Sing Tao Daily, Ren had been under intensive medical care after falling from a building, and had missed the Fourth Plenum. The paper reported the following day that he died on 31 October 2019, likely in Beijing.
