= Hsioh-ren Wei =

Chinese nuclear physicist (1899–1987)

Hsioh-ren Wei
- Traditional Chinese: 魏學仁
- Simplified Chinese: 魏学仁
- Hanyu Pinyin: Wei Xueren
Transcriptions
Standard Mandarin
- Hanyu Pinyin: Wei Xueren
- Wade–Giles: Hsioh-Ren Wei

Hsioh-Ren Wei or Wei Xueren (simplified Chinese: 魏学仁; traditional Chinese: 魏學仁; 1899–1987) was born in Nanjing, Jiangsu. He entered the private University of Nanking in 1918 and received a Bachelor of Science degree in 1922.

In 1925, he received a scholarship to pursue graduate studies in physics at the University of Chicago.

In 1928, upon obtaining a doctoral degree in Physics from the University of Chicago, he returned to China and became a physics professor at the Private University of Nanking as China's first nuclear-physicist.

In 1929, he became the founding dean of science at University of Nanking.

Later in his career, he served for several years as the representative of the Republic of China on the United Nations Security Council.

He is the father of Betty Peh-t'i Wei.
