= Lin Shusen =

Chinese politician

Lin Shusen 林树森

Governor of Guizhou
- In office July 2006 – August 2010
- Preceded by: Shi Xiushi
- Succeeded by: Zhao Kezhi

Party Secretary of Guangzhou
- In office September 2002 – June 2006
- Preceded by: Huang Huahua
- Succeeded by: Zhu Xiaodan

Mayor of Guangzhou
- In office 1996 – April 2003
- Preceded by: Li Ziliu
- Succeeded by: Zhang Guangning

Personal details
- Party: Chinese Communist Party

Lin Shusen (born December 1946) is a politician and government official in the People's Republic of China. He was elected Governor of Guizhou Province in 2007 and 2008.

He was also Chinese Communist Party Deputy Committee Secretary of Guizhou Province. Prior to that he was CCP Committee Secretary and Mayor of Guangzhou, capital of Guangdong Province.

== Biography ==
Lin was born in Shantou, Guangdong, and graduated from the Guangdong University of Technology. He has served as the secretary of the CCP Guangzhou municipal committee, and the chairman of the standing committee of the Guangzhou People's Congress.

Lin Shusen
- Traditional Chinese: 林樹森
- Simplified Chinese: 林树森
Transcriptions
Standard Mandarin
- Hanyu Pinyin: Lín Shùsēn
Yue: Cantonese
- Jyutping: Lam^{4} Syu^{6}-sam^{1}
Southern Min
- Teochew Peng'im: Lim^{5} Ciu^{7}-siam^{1}

He has been an alternate member of the 16th Central Committee of the Chinese Communist Party, and a full member of the 17th Central Committee.
