= Guo Yonghang =

Chinese politician

- 郭永航
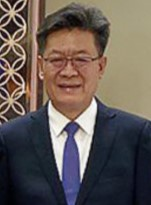
- Guo in 2023

Deputy Chairperson of the Guangdong Provincial Committee of the Chinese People's Political Consultative Conference
- In office 18 January 2026 – 27 March 2026

Party Secretary of Guangzhou
- In office 16 June 2023 – 24 December 2025
- Deputy: Sun Zhiyang
- Preceded by: Lin Keqing
- Succeeded by: Feng Zhonghua

Mayor of Guangzhou
- In office 28 January 2022 (Note: acting from 3 December 2021) – 9 October 2023
- Preceded by: Wen Guohui
- Succeeded by: Sun Zhiyang

Party Secretary of Zhuhai
- In office February 2018 – November 2021
- Preceded by: Guo Yuanqiang
- Succeeded by: Lu Yuyin

Personal details
- Born: October 1965 (age 61) Jiyang, Shandong, China
- Party: Chinese Communist Party (1986-2026, expelled)
- Education: Wuhan University

Guo Yonghang (Chinese: 郭永航; pinyin: Guō Yǒnghang; born October 1965) is a former Chinese politician who was served as the deputy chairperson of the Guangdong Provincial Committee of the Chinese People's Political Consultative Conference. Previously, he was served as Party Secretary of Guangzhou from June 2023 to December 2025. He is a delegate to the 14th National People's Congress.

== Biography ==
Born in 1965 in Jiyang District in Jinan, Shandong, Guo attended Wuhan University from 1985 to 1989 where he studied Chinese history at the Department of History and during this period in June 1986, he joined the Chinese Communist Party (CCP). Following graduation, he was assigned to Shenzhen where he worked in propaganda and organization department, and general office of the CCP Shenzhen Municipal Committee. From 2002, he served as the deputy director of the Publicity Department of the CCP Shenzhen Municipal Committee, director of the cultural industry development office of the Shenzhen Municipal People's Government and Deputy secretary-general of the CCP Shenzhen Municipal Committee. During this period, he obtained a doctorate in management from Wuhan University with a major in administrative management.

In June 2010, he was appointed Secretary of the CCP Yantian District Committee in Shenzhen, and in February of the following year, he also served as Chairman of the District People's Congress Standing Committee. In May 2015, he was promoted to member of the Standing Committee and secretary-general of the Shenzhen Municipal Committee.

In February 2018, he was transferred to Zhuhai where served as secretary of the CCP Zhuhai Municipal Committee, chairman of the Municipal People's Congress Standing Committee and first secretary of the Zhuhai Garrison Party Committee, till 2021. At the sane period, he also served as deputy director of the Guangdong-Macao In-Depth Cooperation Zone in Hengqin and secretary of the Hengqin Working Committee of the Provincial Party Committee.

On 19 October 2021, he was promoted to the position of Vice Governor of Guangdong. On December 3 of the same year, just over a month after taking office as Vice Governor of Guangdong, he took over as Deputy Secretary of the Guangzhou Municipal Committee and became the acting Mayor of the Guangzhou. On 28 January 2022, he was elected Mayor of Guangzhou.

On 16 June 2023, he concurrently served as member of the Standing Committee of the CCP Guangdong Provincial Committee and Secretary of the CCP Guangzhou Municipal Committee. On October 9 of the same year, he resigned as Mayor of Guangzhou and was succeeded by Sun Zhiyang. In December 2025, he stepped down from his positions as a member of the Standing Committee of the CCP Guangdong Provincial Committee and Secretary of the CCP Guangzhou Municipal Committee, and was succeeded by Feng Zhonghua.

On 28 January 2026, he was elected as the deputy chairperson of the Guangdong Provincial Committee of the Chinese People's Political Consultative Conference.

== Downfall ==
On 27 March 2026, Guo was suspected of "serious violations of laws and regulations" by the Central Commission for Discipline Inspection (CCDI), the party's internal disciplinary body, and the National Supervisory Commission, the highest anti-corruption agency of China. Guo was expelled from the party on 2 November.

== Notes ==
Party political offices
Preceded by Lin Keqing	Party Secretary of Guangzhou; 2023–2025	Succeeded by Feng Zhonghua
Preceded by Wen Guohui	Mayor of Guangzhou; 2022–2023	Succeeded by Sun Zhiyang
Preceded by Guo Yuanqiang	Party Secretary of Zhuhai; 2018–2021	Succeeded by Lü Yuyin
