= General Political Department of the People's Liberation Army =

Former political control office of the Chinese army

The General Political Department of the People's Liberation Army (GPD; Chinese: 中国人民解放军总政治部) was the former chief political organ under the Central Military Commission of Chinese Communist Party. It led all political activities in the People's Liberation Army.

Its former director-generals include Liu Shaoqi, Luo Ronghuan, Tan Zheng, Xiao Hua, Li Desheng, Zhang Chunqiao, Wei Guoqing, Yu Qiuli, Yang Baibing, Yu Yongbo, Xu Caihou, and Li Jinai. Its last head was Zhang Yang, who committed suicide.

The department was disbanded in January 2016 and a new agency, the Political Work Department of the Central Military Commission, was founded in its stead.

== During the Cultural Revolution ==
The General Political Department of the People's Liberation Army played an important role for Mao Zedong during the Cultural Revolution, through its control of "political departments" that were set up throughout the state apparatus.

In the summer of 1964 before the Cultural Revolution, organizations called "political departments" were set up in throughout branches of the administration in China, in central and regional levels. Members were to study the works of Mao Zedong and emulate the army. These organizations were headed by the General Political Department, the organ by which Mao Zedong and Lin Biao exercised control over the armed forces. This made the economic "political department" also under command of the armed forces, rather than the Party's Central Committee. This effectively created a "parallel chain of command" which bypassed the Party. The role of the GPD during the Cultural Revolution meant that when the Party lines of command failed amidst the chaos, alternative chains of command would be implemented directly controlled by Mao. By 1966, even before the Cultural Revolution began, this system was effective.

== Structure ==
The General Political Department was led by a director, usually of General rank, and numerous deputy directors, most of whom were also accorded General rank (others were Lt. Generals). The director was a military-region level position. The last director was Zhang Yang, who served until 2016 and became head of the department's successor body.

The department also had a number of departments under it: the General Office, the Discipline Inspection Department, the Foreign Affairs Bureau General Office, the Justice Bureau General Office, Mass Work Bureau, General Office, Cadre Department, Culture Department, Directly Subordinated Organs Work Department, Liaison Department, Organization Department, Propaganda Department, and Security Department. The department also oversaw the Military Museum of the Chinese People's Revolution, the PLA Daily, the PLA Literature and Art Press (Kunlun Press), PLA Pictorial, and PLA Press.

== See also ==
- Political Warfare Bureau, Ministry of National Defense (Republic of China)
