= Zhu Xiaodan =

Chinese politician (born 1953)

- 朱小丹
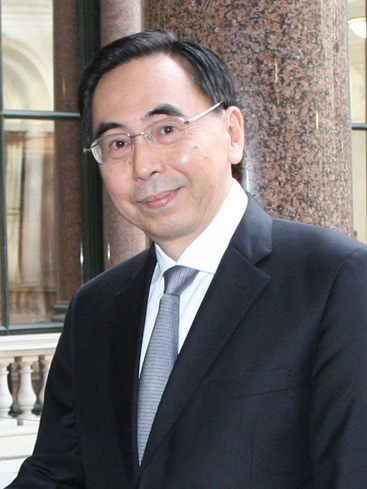
- Zhu in 2013

Governor of Guangdong
- In office 5 November 2011 – 30 December 2016
- Preceded by: Huang Huahua
- Succeeded by: Ma Xingrui

Party Secretary of Guangzhou
- In office July 2006 – April 2010
- Preceded by: Lin Shusen
- Succeeded by: Zhang Guangning

Personal details
- Born: January 1953 (age 73) Guangzhou
- Party: Chinese Communist Party

Zhu Xiaodan (Chinese: 朱小丹; pinyin: Zhū Xiǎodān; Jyutping: Zyu1 Siu2Daan1; born January 1953) is a Chinese politician who served as Governor of Guangdong from 2011 to 2016. A lifelong Communist functionary, Zhu was appointed Vice Governor of Guangdong in February 2010 and became acting Governor in November 2011 following the resignation of Huang Huahua. Zhu has spent his entire political career in Guangdong province. He was elected Governor in January 2012.

== Career ==
Zhu was born in 1953 in Guangzhou; he traces his ancestry to Wenzhou, Zhejiang. He began his career at the Guangzhou musical instruments factory, where he first joined the Communist Youth League.

In 1977, he entered the municipal Communist Youth League organization of Guangzhou as a functionary. In 1984 he became head of the Communist Youth League in Guangzhou. In 1987, he was named party secretary of Conghua County. In 1991, he entered the Guangzhou party committee as a deputy secretary-general in 1991, then in December that year, he was named a member of the Guangzhou Party Standing Committee and head of the Guangzhou party Publicity Department. In 1996, he was named deputy party chief of Guangzhou.

In 2002, Zhu was named executive deputy head, then head of the United Front Department of Guangdong. In 2004, he was named head of propaganda of the Guangdong Party Committee. In July 2006, he was named party chief of Guangzhou, entering the provincial Party Standing Committee in 2007. Then he was named vice-governor of Guangdong in February 2010, then beginning on November 4, 2011, he was named Governor of Guangdong, confirmed on January 17, 2012. In 2016, upon leaving the office of governor, Zhu was made a vice chair of the National People's Congress Financial and Economic Affairs Committee.

Zhu is an alternate member of the 17th Central Committee of the Chinese Communist Party, and a full member of the 18th Central Committee.

== Personal life ==
Zhu is a fan of the Guangzhou Evergrande football club.

Political offices
Preceded by Huang Huahua	Governor of Guangdong; 2011–2016	Succeeded by Ma Xingrui
