= Zhang Guangning =

Chinese politician

Zhang Guangning 张广宁

Party Secretary of Guangzhou
- In office April 2010 – December 2011
- Preceded by: Zhu Xiaodan
- Succeeded by: Wan Qingliang

Mayor of Guangzhou
- In office April 2003 – 16 April 2010
- Preceded by: Lin Shusen
- Succeeded by: Wan Qingliang

Zhang Guangning (simplified Chinese: 张广宁; traditional Chinese: 張廣寧; pinyin: Zhāngguǎngníng; born 1953 in Jiangsu) was the 14th Mayor of Guangzhou, Guangdong province, China, and later Party Secretary of Guangzhou.

== Biography ==
He holds a Masters in the Philosophy of Law and an MBA and graduated from the elite party school of the CPC central committee. He has served as secretary of the CYLC branch in the work section of Guangzhou Steel Works, deputy secretary and secretary of the CPC Committee of Guangzhou Steel Works, and director of the training center of Guangzhou Steel Works until 1996, when he was elected deputy mayor of Guangzhou.

He was elected deputy to the 10th National People's Congress, deputy to the 7th and 8th People's Congress of Guangdong province, and deputy to the 11th and 12th People's Congress of Guangzhou Municipality. He serves as Vice President of the China Association of Mayors. Guangzhou will also host the 16th Asian Games in 2010, for which Zhang is the secretary-general.

In 2007 he became co-president of the United Cities and Local Governments organisation and was longlisted for the 2008 World Mayor award.
