= Lu Ruihua =

Chinese politician (1938–2025)

- 卢瑞华

Governor of Guangdong
- In office 10 February 1996 – 20 January 2003
- Preceded by: Zhu Senlin
- Succeeded by: Huang Huahua

Personal details
- Born: November 1938 Chaozhou, Guangdong, China
- Died: 13 May 2025 (aged 86) Guangzhou, Guangdong, China
- Party: Chinese Communist Party

Chinese name
- Traditional Chinese: 盧瑞華
- Simplified Chinese: 卢瑞华
Transcriptions
Standard Mandarin
- Hanyu Pinyin: Lú Ruìhuá
Yue: Cantonese
- Jyutping: Lou4 Seoi6 Waa4
Southern Min
- Teochew Peng'im: Lou5 Sui6 Hua5

Lu Ruihua (simplified Chinese: 卢瑞华; traditional Chinese: 盧瑞華; pinyin: Lú Ruìhuá; Jyutping: Lou4 Seui6 Wa4; November 1938 – 13 May 2025) was a Chinese politician who served as Governor of Guangdong.

Lu joined the Chinese Communist Party in June 1972. He died on 13 May 2025, at the age of 86.

Political offices
Preceded by Zhu Senlin	Governor of Guangdong; 1996–2003	Succeeded by Huang Huahua
