= Zeng Yangfu =

- 曾養甫
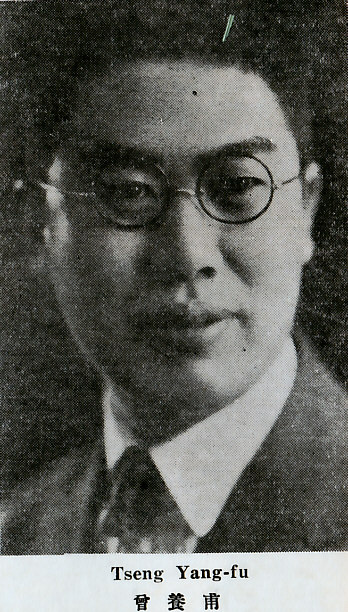
- A photo of Zeng published in the fourth edition of Who's Who in China (1931)

Member of the Legislative Yuan
- In office 18 May 1948 – 1949

Minister of Transportation and Communication
- In office December 1942 – February 1945
- Preceded by: Chang Kia-ngau
- Succeeded by: Yu Feipeng

Mayor of Guangzhou
- In office August 1936 – 21 October 1938
- Preceded by: Liu Jiwen
- Succeeded by: Peng Dongyuan

Personal details
- Born: Zeng Xianhao; 23 October 1898 Pingyuan County, Guangdong, China
- Died: 28 August 1969 (aged 70) Hong Kong
- Party: Kuomintang
- Education: Peiyang University; University of Pittsburgh

Chinese name
- Traditional Chinese: 曾養甫
- Simplified Chinese: 曾养甫
Transcriptions
Standard Mandarin
- Hanyu Pinyin: Céng Yǎngfǔ
- Bopomofo: ㄘㄥˊㄧㄤˇㄈㄨˇ
- Wade–Giles: Ts'êng^{2} Yang^{3}-fu^{3}
Hakka
- Romanization: Cên^{2} Yong^{1}-pu^{3}
- Pha̍k-fa-sṳ: Chhèn Yông-phú
Yue: Cantonese
- Jyutping: Cang^{4} Joeng^{5}-fu^{2}

Birth name
- Traditional Chinese: 曾憲浩
- Simplified Chinese: 曾宪浩
Transcriptions
Standard Mandarin
- Hanyu Pinyin: Céng Xiànhào
- Bopomofo: ㄘㄥˊㄒㄧㄢˋㄏㄠˋ
- Wade–Giles: Ts'êng^{2} Hsien^{4}-hao^{4}
Hakka
- Romanization: Cên^{2} Hian^{3}-hau^{1}
- Pha̍k-fa-sṳ: Chhèn Hién-hâu
Yue: Cantonese
- Jyutping: Cang^{4} Hin^{3}-hou^{6}

Zeng Xianhao (Chinese: 曾憲浩; 23 October 1898 – 28 August 1969) was a Chinese-born politician better known by the courtesy name Zeng Yangfu (曾养甫). He was a native of Pingyuan County, Guangdong. Zeng served the Nationalist government as Mayor of Guangzhou from 1936 to 1938. He later led the Ministry of Transportation and Communications from 1942 to 1945.

Upon graduation from Peiyang University in 1923, Zeng enrolled at the University of Pittsburgh. Upon his return to China in 1925, Zeng was named to the Kuomintang Central Committee and a political operative of the National Revolutionary Army. Zeng also served as deputy minister of the Agriculture and Mineral Resources. As director of the Zhejiang Provincial Infrastructure Department, Zeng oversaw several construction projects including the Zhejiang-Jiangxi Railway and the Qiantang River Bridge. In 1935, Zeng became a member of several government committees on infrastructure. He assumed the mayoralty of Guangzhou between 1936 and 1938, before taking office as transportation and communications minister in 1942. After resigning the office in 1945 for health reasons, Zeng was elected to the Legislative Yuan in 1948. The next year, he left China for Hong Kong, where he died in 1969.
