= Yang Shangkun =

President of China from 1988 to 1993

- 杨尚昆
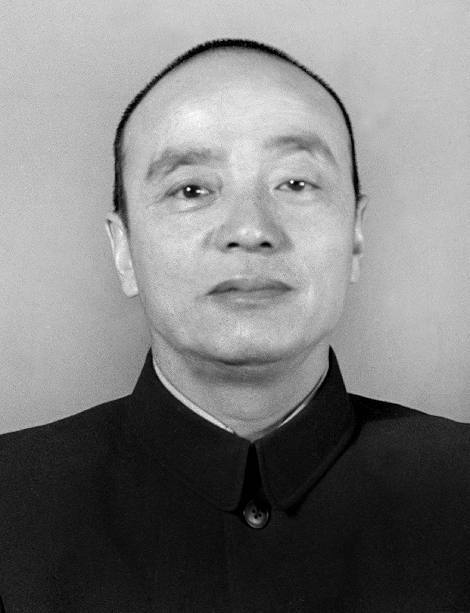
- Yang in the 1960s

President of China
- In office 8 April 1988 – 27 March 1993
- Premier: Li Peng
- Vice President: Wang Zhen
- Leader: Zhao Ziyang; Jiang Zemin
- Preceded by: Li Xiannian
- Succeeded by: Jiang Zemin

Vice Chairman of the Central Military Commission
- In office State Commission: 20 June 1983 – 28 March 1993; Party Commission: 12 September 1982 – 19 October 1992
- Chairman: Deng Xiaoping; Jiang Zemin

Secretary-General of the CCP Central Military Commission
- In office August 1945 – November 1956
- Succeeded by: Huang Kecheng
- In office July 1981 – November 1989
- Preceded by: Geng Biao
- Succeeded by: Yang Baibing

Director of the General Office of the Chinese Communist Party
- In office 24 October 1945 – 10 November 1965
- Chairman: Mao Zedong
- Preceded by: Li Fuchun
- Succeeded by: Wang Dongxing

Member of the National People's Congress
- In office 21 December 1964 – 13 January 1975
- Constituency: PLA At-large
- In office 25 March 1988 – 15 March 1993
- Constituency: Sichuan At-large

7th Mayor of Guangzhou
- In office March 1979 – September 1981
- Preceded by: Jiao Linyi
- Succeeded by: Liang Lingguang

Personal details
- Born: 3 August 1907 Tongnan, Chongqing, Sichuan, Qing China
- Died: 14 September 1998 (aged 91) Beijing, China
- Party: Chinese Communist Party (1926–1998)
- Spouse: Li Bozhao (m. 1929; died 1985)
- Children: 3
- Relatives: Yang Baibing
- Education: Shanghai University, Moscow Sun Yat-sen University

Yang Shangkun
- Simplified Chinese: 杨尚昆
- Traditional Chinese: 楊尚昆
Transcriptions
Standard Mandarin
- Hanyu Pinyin: Yáng Shàngkūn
Yue: Cantonese
- Jyutping: Joeng4 Soeng6-kwan1

Yang Shangkun (3 August 1907 – 14 September 1998) was a Chinese Communist military and political leader, president of China from 1988 to 1993, and one of the Eight Elders that dominated the party after the death of Mao Zedong.

Born to a prosperous land-owning family, Yang studied politics at Shanghai University and Marxist philosophy and revolutionary tactics at Moscow Sun Yat-sen University he was one of the 28 Bolsheviks. He went on to hold high office under both Mao Zedong and later Deng Xiaoping; from 1945 to 1965 he was Director of the General Office and from 1945 to 1956 Secretary–General of the Central Military Commission (CMC). In these positions, Yang oversaw much of the day-to-day running of government and Party affairs, both political and military, amassing a great deal of bureaucratic power by controlling things like the flow of documents, the keeping of records, and the approval and allocation of funds. Purged, arrested and imprisoned during the Cultural Revolution, he spent 12 years in prison but staged a comeback in 1978, becoming a key ally of Deng, serving as Mayor of Guangzhou (1979–81), and returning to the CMC as Secretary–General and also Vice Chairman (1981–89), before assuming the presidency.

One of the earliest supporters of reform and opening up, Yang justified it with references to Vladimir Lenin and the New Economic Policy. However, he strongly opposed any form of political reform, and, despite his own suffering during the Cultural Revolution, actively defended the image and record of Mao. Throughout the 1980s and early 1990s, Yang and his half-brother, General Yang Baibing, were among the most powerful figures in the People's Liberation Army (PLA). Despite his initial hesitation, he went on to play a leading role in crushing the 1989 Tiananmen Square protests and was actually the one who planned and supervised the operations to clear the square and surrounding streets. Yang's downfall came in 1993, when he failed in his attempts to undermine the new leadership of Jiang Zemin and to retain control of the PLA, and was forced to retire by a coalition of Party elders, including Deng himself.

== Early life and education ==
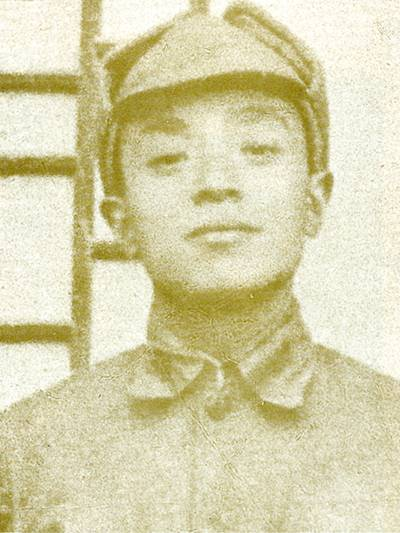
Yang in 1940

Yang was born on 3 August 1907 in Shuangjiang, Tongnan, Sichuan, which is now part of Chongqing. His birth date was established with the help of a family genealogy. His elder brother Yang Angong (1898–1927), who founded the early organisation of the Chinese Communist Party (CCP) in Sichuan, had a strong influence on his political views.

Yang joined the Communist Youth League in 1925 and the CCP in 1926. In May 1926, he entered Shanghai University. In late 1926, he went to the Soviet Union to study at Sun Yat-sen University in Moscow. He was one of the 28 Bolsheviks, a group of Chinese students trained in Moscow.

== Revolutionary career ==
=== Shanghai and the Central Soviet ===
After returning to China in early 1931, Yang headed the propaganda department of the All-China Federation of Trade Unions and then the CCP's Central Propaganda Department, and he helped lead the workers' movement and anti-Japanese activities in Shanghai. In 1933, he moved to the Central Soviet base area, where he served as deputy principal of the party school, director of the political department of the First Front Army and deputy director of the General Political Department of the Central Military Commission (CMC).

In January 1934, Yang became political commissar of the Red Army's Third Army Corps, commanded by Peng Dehuai. He took part in the Long March, and at the Zunyi Conference in 1935, he supported Mao Zedong. He also opposed the factional activities of Zhang Guotao.

=== Second Sino-Japanese War ===
After the start of the Second Sino-Japanese War, Yang went to the North China front, where he assisted Liu Shaoqi in building anti-Japanese base areas with the Eighth Route Army. He became deputy secretary and then secretary of the CCP's North China Bureau, and he assisted Zhu De and Peng Dehuai in directing guerrilla warfare. He took part in the Hundred Regiments Offensive. In early 1941, he returned to Yan'an to work in the party's central organs.

=== Chinese Civil War ===
During the Chinese Civil War, Yang managed the daily affairs of the central party and military bodies and organised the evacuation of Yan'an. In 1947, he became secretary-general of the Central Rear Committee and commander of its rear detachment, assisting Ye Jianying. In 1948, he became deputy secretary-general of the Central Committee, director of its General Office and secretary-general of the CMC, assisting Zhou Enlai with the daily work of the party centre and the CMC. After the Liaoshen, Huaihai and Pingjin campaigns, he organised the move of the central organs and the headquarters of the People's Liberation Army (PLA) to Beiping, and he helped prepare the first session of the Chinese People's Political Consultative Conference and the ceremony founding the People's Republic.

== People's Republic ==
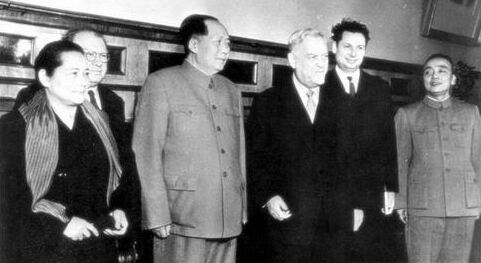
Yang (right) with Nikolai Bulganin in 1957

After the founding of the People's Republic of China in 1949, Yang remained director of the General Office and deputy secretary-general of the Central Committee, and he was also secretary-general of the CMC and secretary of the party committee of the central government organs. He and Luo Ruiqing were long responsible for Mao's security, with Yang in charge of Zhongnanhai. In September 1956, at the first plenary session of the 8th Central Committee, he was elected an alternate member of the party's Secretariat. In 1962, he helped carry out the policy of readjusting the national economy.

=== Purge ===
On 10 November 1965, Yang was removed from his central posts and nominally transferred to Guangdong, but in practice he was placed under investigation. The stated reason was that he had installed listening devices without the knowledge of the Central Committee. According to the historian Luo Pinghan, the devices were tape recorders used in the General Office's recording work. At an enlarged meeting of the Politburo in May 1966, chaired by Liu Shaoqi, which adopted the May 16 Notification, Yang was formally dismissed, and he, Peng Zhen, Luo Ruiqing and Lu Dingyi were accused of forming an anti-party clique. He was imprisoned for 12 years during the Cultural Revolution.

=== Rehabilitation and Guangdong ===
After the Third Plenary Session of the 11th Central Committee in December 1978, Yang was rehabilitated. A review by the General Office, approved by the Central Secretariat, concluded that he had never engaged in conspiratorial activities in the office's recording work.

From December 1978 to the end of 1980, Yang was second secretary of the party committee and vice-governor of Guangdong, first secretary of the party committee and chairman of the revolutionary committee of Guangzhou, and first political commissar of the Guangdong Military District. He worked on reform and opening up and on the trial special economic zones in the province. Along with Xi Zhongxun, he persuaded Deng Xiaoping that Guangdong should become a national demonstration zone for reform and opening up.

=== Military Commission ===
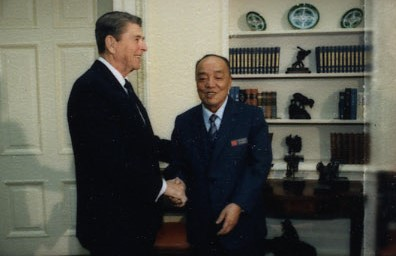
Yang with Ronald Reagan at the White House in 1987

In September 1980, Yang was elected a vice chairman and the secretary-general of the Standing Committee of the 5th National People's Congress. In July 1981, he became a standing member and secretary-general of the CMC, and in September 1982, he became its executive vice chairman. In 1982, he was elected to the Politburo of the 12th Central Committee, and in 1983, he became a vice chairman of the state CMC. As executive vice chairman, he oversaw the reduction of the PLA by one million troops in the mid-1980s.

In the early 1980s, Yang supported the American journalist Harrison Salisbury in compiling an account of the Long March from interviews with surviving participants, which was published as The Long March: The Untold Story. On 20 May 1987, as vice chairman of the CMC, he met US President Ronald Reagan in the Oval Office. In November 1987, he was re-elected to the Politburo at the first plenary session of the 13th Central Committee.

== Presidency ==
In April 1988, the first session of the 7th National People's Congress elected Yang president, succeeding Li Xiannian, with Wang Zhen as vice president. As president, he took part in foreign policy decisions and worked on the policy of peaceful reunification under "one country, two systems".

=== 1989 Tiananmen Square protests ===
In May 1989, the Soviet leader Mikhail Gorbachev paid an official visit to China at Yang's invitation, during which Yang, the CCP general secretary Zhao Ziyang and the premier Li Peng each held talks with him. According to a CIA analysis of September 1989, Deng, Yang and the members of the Politburo Standing Committee other than Zhao largely determined the government's course during the protests. According to documents published in The Tiananmen Papers in 2001, Yang said at meetings in early May that Zhao's "notion of pacifying the student movement through democracy and law is good".

At a meeting of party leaders on 17 May, Yang argued that martial law should be declared. At a meeting of party, government and military officials on 19 May, at which martial law was announced, he said that the authorities had no alternative but to move troops into the capital to maintain order. Yang was president during the crackdown in Beijing in June 1989, in which troops killed hundreds of unarmed protesters. A CIA assessment of August 1989 described him as having worked to ensure that military commanders followed orders.

In November 1989, at the fifth plenary session of the 13th Central Committee, Yang became first vice chairman of the CMC and gave up the post of secretary-general. His half-brother Yang Baibing, who became head of the PLA's ideological work after the crackdown, gained considerable influence in the military.

=== Foreign relations ===
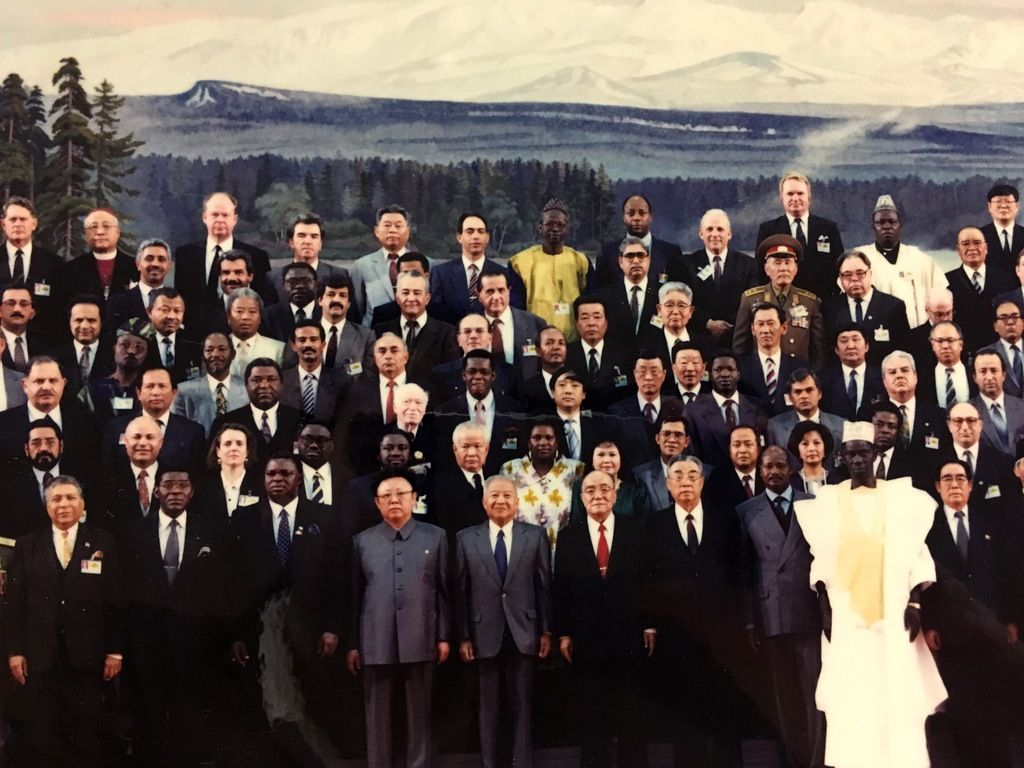
Yang (first row, fifth from right) at Kim Il Sung's 80th birthday celebrations in 1992

On 4 April 1990, Yang signed the presidential order promulgating the Basic Law of Hong Kong, which the National People's Congress had adopted that day. In May 1990, he visited five Latin American countries, including Mexico, as part of China's effort to counter Taiwan's attempts to take diplomatic advantage of the Tiananmen crackdown in the region.

In late August 1991, shortly after the failed coup in Moscow, Yang visited Mongolia, the first visit by a senior Chinese leader in 31 years. He signed a loan package and economic agreements, including one allowing Mongolia to ship goods through the port of Tianjin, and diplomats expected him to raise China's concerns about Mongolian nationalism in Inner Mongolia. In January 1992, he made a four-day state visit to Singapore, where he was received by President Wee Kim Wee.

=== Southern tour and retirement ===
In January 1992, Yang joined Deng in Shenzhen and Zhuhai during Deng's southern tour. He was present in Zhuhai on 28 January when Deng said that anyone who opposed reform should "go to sleep".

At the 14th Party Congress in October 1992, Yang and Yang Baibing were eased out of their key posts in a move by Deng and senior professional military officers. Western and Chinese analysts said that the brothers were distrusted for allegedly building an independent power base and stressing communist ideology over professionalism in the military. According to the Associated Press, Deng feared that the brothers were accumulating too much power, and Yang Baibing's supporters were purged from the officer corps. In March 1993, Jiang Zemin succeeded Yang as president.

== Later life and death ==
In a letter published in 2004, the army surgeon Jiang Yanyong wrote that when he visited Yang in 1998, Yang told him that the CCP had committed the most serious mistakes in its history in the June Fourth incident, and that although he could do nothing, the mistakes would be corrected in the future. In 1998, Yang donated more than 20,000 yuan of back pay to areas hit by the floods.

Yang died on 14 September 1998, aged 91. His official obituary described him as "a great proletarian revolutionary, a statesman, a military strategist, a staunch Marxist, an outstanding leader of the party, the state, and the people's army." In 2001, the ashes of Yang and his wife were interred at a cemetery named after him in Tongnan District, Chongqing. His birthplace in Jinlong village, Shuangjiang, a courtyard house built in 1862, was renovated in 2007 and 2021 and houses an exhibition on his life with nearly 400 photographs and more than 200 artefacts.

== Personal life ==
In 1929, he married Li Bozhao, a woman who participated in the Long March alongside Yang. She had studied in the Soviet Union and even learned yablochko in Moscow. They had three sons.

== See also ==
- Politics of China

Political offices
Preceded by Jiao Linyi	Chairman of the Guangzhou Revolutionary Committee; 1979–1981	Succeeded by Liang Lingguang as Mayor of Guangzhou
Preceded by Peng Zhen	Secretary-General of the Standing Committee of the National People's Congress; 1980–1983	Succeeded by Wang Hanbin
Preceded by Li Xiannian	President of China; 1988–1993	Succeeded by Jiang Zemin
Preceded by Zhao Ziyang	First Vice Chairman of the PRC Central Military Commission; 1989–1993	Succeeded by Liu Huaqing
Party political offices
Preceded by Li Fuchun	Chief of the General Office of the Chinese Communist Party; 1945–1965	Succeeded by Wang Dongxing
Preceded by none	Secretary-General of the CCP Central Military Commission; 1945–1956	Succeeded by Huang Kecheng
Preceded by Geng Biao	Secretary-General of the CCP Central Military Commission; 1981–1989	Succeeded by Yang Baibing
Preceded by Deng Yingchao	Leader of the Central Leading Group for Taiwan Affairs; 1987–1989	Succeeded by Jiang Zemin
Preceded by Zhao Ziyang	First Vice Chairman of the CCP Central Military Commission; 1989–1992	Succeeded by Liu Huaqing
Order of precedence
Preceded by Deng Xiaoping as Chairman of the Central Military Commission (2nd-ranked)	Orders of precedence in the People's Republic of China (President of China; 3rd-ranked); 1988–1993	Succeeded by Li Peng as Premier (4th-ranked)
