= Ye Xuanping =

Chinese politician (1924–2019)

- 叶选平

Governor of Guangdong
- In office August 1985 – May 1991
- Preceded by: Liang Lingguang
- Succeeded by: Zhu Senlin

Mayor of Guangzhou
- In office July 1983 – August 1985
- Preceded by: Liang Lingguang
- Succeeded by: Zhu Senlin

Personal details
- Born: 20 December 1924 Meixian, Guangdong, China
- Died: 17 September 2019 (aged 94) Guangzhou, Guangdong, China
- Party: Chinese Communist Party
- Parent(s): Ye Jianying; Feng Hua
- Relatives: Ye Xuanning (half-brother), Zou Jiahua (brother-in-law)

Chinese name
- Simplified Chinese: 叶选平
- Traditional Chinese: 葉選平
Transcriptions
Standard Mandarin
- Hanyu Pinyin: Yè Xuǎnpíng
- Wade–Giles: Yeh^{4} Hsüan^{3}-p’ing^{2}
- IPA: [jê ɕɥɛ̀npʰǐŋ]
Yue: Cantonese
- Jyutping: Jip^{6} Syun^{2} Peng^{4}
- IPA: [jip̚˨ syn˧˥.pʰɛŋ˩]

Ye Xuanping (Chinese: 叶选平; 20 December 1924 – 17 September 2019) was a Chinese official, who served as Mayor of Guangzhou from 1980 to 1985 and Governor of Guangdong, his native province, from 1985 to 1991. Ye was a strong supporter of Deng Xiaoping's reform and opening up policy. Under his leadership, Guangdong grew economically prosperous and gained significant autonomy from Beijing. Concerned about his power, the national government manoeuvred to relieve him of the governorship, but allowed him to maintain his power base in Guangdong. He subsequently served as Vice-Chairman of the Chinese People's Political Consultative Conference from 1991 to 2003.

Ye was the eldest son of Ye Jianying, one of the founding Ten Marshals of the People's Republic of China, who was instrumental in overthrowing the Gang of Four and ending the Cultural Revolution. After the death of his father, he became the patriarch of their powerful family, dubbed the "Ye Dynasty".

== Early life ==
Ye Xuanping was born in November 1924 in Meixian, Guangdong, Republic of China. He was the eldest son of Ye Jianying, who later became one of the founding Ten Marshals of the People's Republic of China. When Xuanping was born, his father was serving as county magistrate of Xiangshan, and he was raised by his mother Feng Hua (冯华; 馮華).

During the Second Sino-Japanese War, Ye lived in Yan'an, the headquarters of the Chinese Communist Party (CCP), and did not reunite with his father until 1941. He studied mechanics at the Yan'an Institute of Natural Sciences from 1941 to 1945, and joined the CCP in 1945. After graduation he worked at Yan'an Arsenal and other factories.

== Career ==
After the founding of the People's Republic of China in 1949, Ye briefly studied at Harbin Institute of Technology and Tsinghua University from 1949 to 1950, and then worked at Shenyang No. 1 Machine Tool Factory. In 1952 he was sent to the Soviet Union to receive training at a machine tool factory, and was appointed Chief Engineer of Shenyang No. 1 Machine Tool Factory after returning to China in 1954. He was transferred to Beijing in 1962 and served as Chief Engineer of Beijing No. 1 Machine Tool Factory until 1973. From 1973 to 1977 he was deputy head of the Beijing Machinery Bureau.

In 1976, Marshal Ye Jianying played a key role in a coup overthrowing the Gang of Four and ending the Cultural Revolution. In 1977, Xuanping was sent to study at the Central Party School of the Chinese Communist Party, and subsequently served as Director of the Third Bureau of the State Science and Technology Commission from 1978 to 1980.

=== Guangdong Province ===
In 1980, Ye was appointed Mayor of Guangzhou and concurrently Vice Governor of Guangdong province. He was promoted to Governor of Guangdong in the summer of 1985, replacing Liang Lingguang. A follower of Deng Xiaoping, Ye was a stalwart supporter of economic liberalization and more reform-minded than the Party Secretary Lin Ruo. He promoted Guangdong's special economic zones, Shenzhen and Hainan, while paying lip service to macroeconomic control. Moreover, his wife Wu Xiaolan served as Vice Mayor of Shenzhen until she was dismissed by Li Hao in 1986. Ye cultivated strong ties with business magnates of Hong Kong and Macau, including Stanley Ho and Ann Tse-kai.

As a member of the Central Committee, Ye, together with Shanghai mayor Zhu Rongji, was a major regional leader who supported the reformist General Secretary Zhao Ziyang, and resisted Premier Li Peng's policy of retrenchment. Following the 1989 Tiananmen Square protests and massacre and the fall of Zhao Ziyang, the Ye family's power was believed to have weakened due to its sympathy with Zhao.

Under Ye's leadership, Guangdong grew economically prosperous while gaining significant autonomy from the national government in Beijing, and Hong Kong media dubbed him the "Emperor of the South". The central government, increasingly concerned about his power, manoeuvred to relieve him of the governorship. In April 1991, Ye agreed to leave his post and accepted the appointment as Vice Chairman of the 7th Chinese People's Political Consultative Conference (CPPCC), a nominally higher ranking position. In return, Beijing agreed to appoint Zhu Senlin, his designated candidate, as his successor, and allowed Ye to continue to reside in Guangdong. Ye had reportedly threatened to withhold Guangdong's remittance to Beijing if his conditions were not met, and effectively maintained his power base in the province. He served two more terms (8th and 9th CPPCC) as Vice Chairman, until 2003.

Ye was an alternate member of the 12th Central Committee of the Chinese Communist Party, and a full member of the 13th and 14th Central Committees. He was also a delegate to the 5th and 6th National People's Congresses.

On 17 September 2019, Ye died in Guangzhou, aged 94.

== Family ==
After the death of Marshal Ye Jianying, Ye Xuanping became the patriarch of the powerful family dubbed the "Ye Dynasty". His younger half brother, Ye Xuanning, served as China's military spy chief. He died in 2016. Another brother, Ye Xuanlian, was a manager of the People's Liberation Army's China Poly Group. His sister, Ye Chumei, is married to Zou Jiahua, a former Vice Premier of China.

Ye Xuanping's son, Ye Xinfu, is a businessman in Hong Kong who founded the conglomerate P W Asia and served as a director of at least 11 companies, including Tse Sui Luen, a major jewellery chain. His grandson, Ye Zhonghao, was appointed head of Guangdong's Yunfu Hi-Tech Industry Development Zone in 2017.
