= Sun Zhiyang =

Chinese politician (born 1974)

- 孙志洋
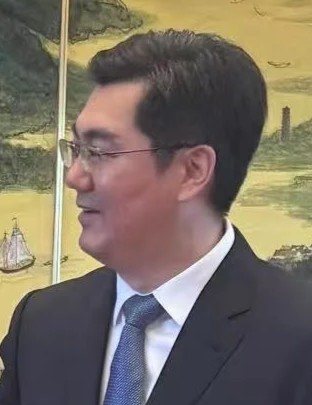
- Sun in 2025

Mayor of Guangzhou
- Incumbent
- Assumed office 18 January 2024 (Note: acting from October 2023)
- Preceded by: Guo Yonghang

Vice Governor of Guangdong
- In office 18 March 2021 – 2023

Personal details
- Born: May 1974 (age 52) Fuyu, Jilin, China
- Party: Chinese Communist Party
- Education: Jilin University
- Occupation: Politician, engineer (automotive)

Sun Zhiyang (Chinese: 孙志洋; pinyin: Sūn Zhìyáng; born May 1974) is a Chinese politician who is the current mayor of Guangzhou, a position he has held since January 2024. He previously served as vice governor of Guangdong from 2021 to 2023. Prior to his political career, Sun worked as a senior engineer and was formerly the deputy general manager of the Chinese state-owned automobile manufacturer FAW Group.

== Early life and education ==
Born in 1974 in Fuyu, Sun joined the Chinese Communist Party (CCP) in 1992. He studied at the School of Engineering Technology and Equipment at the Jilin University of Technology from 1993 to 1997. He earned a master's degree in business administration from Jilin University in 2003.

== Industrial career ==
He began his career at the Changchun Automobile Research Institute, where he served as a technician and chief designer in the chassis design office of the department of the medium-sized vehicles from 1997 to 2001. In 2001, he transferred to FAW Group as a product planner and assistant director of the general planning office within the planning department.

From 2002 to 2009, he was appointed director of the general planning office and deputy head of the comprehensive project preparation group of the FAW Toyota, a joint venture between FAW and Japanese automaker Toyota. From 2002 to 2007, he served as the director of the Toyota project office while concurrently serving as the director of the general planning office. During this period, he took part in a full-time Japanese language class at Northeast Normal University from 2004 to 2005 and then took part in training with Toyota Corporation in Japan from 2005 to 2006. In 2009, he then became deputy general manager and senior engineer of the FAW Group, serving until 2012. He served as the secretary of the Youth League Committee within the FAW Group from 2012 to 2014. In 2014, he was appointed deputy director of the development department of the FAW Group. By 2015, he was appointed deputy director of the general office of the party committee and secretary of the standing committee of the party committee within the FAW Group, and in 2017 became director of the general office. Later in 2018, he was appointed director of the office of mobile travel and the head of the mobile travel preparatory group, as well as assistant to the general manager. In 2021, he left from the FAW Group and in his farewell letter he wrote "learning, innovation, struggle and self-improvement are the most precious spiritual wealth left to me by this fighting collective of FAW".

== Political career ==
On 18 March 2021, the 30th meeting of the Standing Committee of the 13th Guangdong Provincial People's Congress voted to appoint Sun Zhiyang as the Vice Governor of Guangdong Province. Aged 47 at the time of appointment, he became the youngest person to hold the position. During his tenure as vice governor, due to his experience in the automobile industry, he oversaw the development of Guangdong's automobile industrial chain. In October 2023, he was appointed the acting mayor of Guangzhou and Deputy Secretary of the CCP Guangzhou Municipal Committee. According to Singaporean Chinese newspaper Lianhe Zaobao, the appointment of Sun as acting mayor is due to Guangzhou's importance as base for China's automotive industry, and he was expected to help the development of Guangzhou's automotive industry to attain the target of trillion-level "smart car city" development goal.

On 18 January 2024, he was formally elected as mayor of Guangzhou by the Fourth Session of the 16th Guangzhou Municipal People's Congress.

== Notes ==
Government offices
Preceded by Guo Yonghang	Mayor of Guangzhou; 2024–present	Incumbent
