= Chen Jianhua =

Chinese politician

- 陈建华
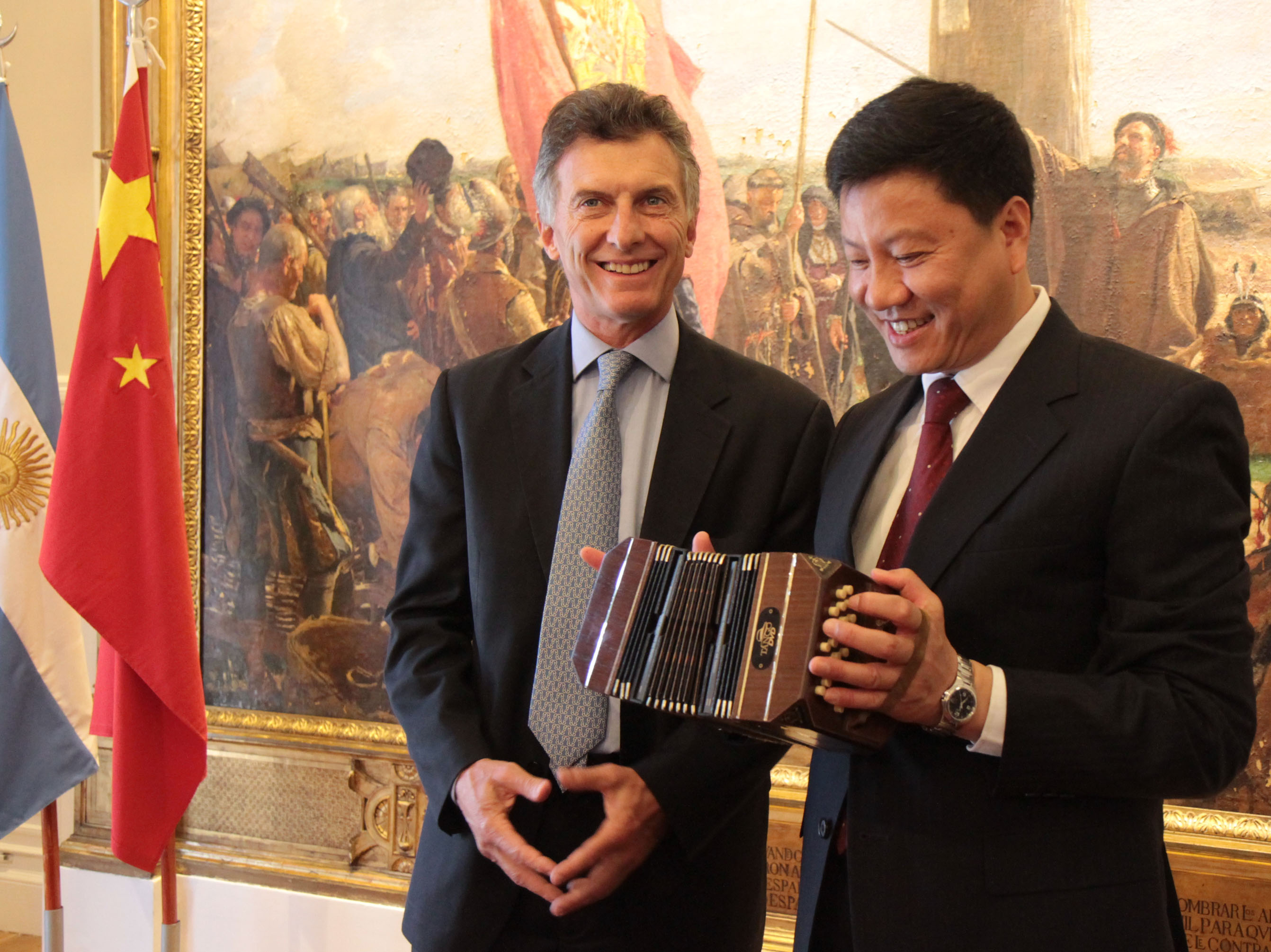

10th Chairman of the Standing Committee of the Guangzhou People's Congress
- In office 26 January 2016 – June 2020
- Preceded by: Zhang Guifang
- Succeeded by: Shi Qizhu

16th Mayor of Guangzhou
- In office 20 December 2011 – 25 January 2016
- Preceded by: Wan Qingliang
- Succeeded by: Wen Guohui

Personal details
- Born: March 1956 (age 70) Lufeng, Guangdong
- Party: Chinese Communist Party
- Occupation: Politician

Chen Jianhua (Chinese: 陈建华; pinyin: Chén Jiànhuá; Cantonese: Chan Geen Wah; born March 1956) is a Chinese politician who served as the chairman of the Guangzhou People's Congress from 2016 to 2020. He formerly served as Mayor of Guangzhou. Chen was appointed acting mayor on 20 November 2011 following the resignation of Wan Qingliang, and elected mayor on 11 January 2012.

Chen was born in Lufeng, Guangdong. He was at one point secretary to Guangdong party chief Xie Fei. He served as the Chinese Communist Party Committee Secretary of Conghua while a member of the Guangzhou municipal Party Standing Committee, then head of the Publicity Department of the Guangzhou party committee. He was then named party chief of Heyuan, before taking over as mayor of Guangzhou in 2011. On 26 January 2016, Chen Jianhua was elected the Chairman of the Standing Committee of the Guangzhou People's Congress.

Political offices
Preceded by Zhang Guifang	Chairman of the Guangzhou People's Congress; 2016 – 2020	Succeeded by Shi Qizhu
Preceded by Wan Qingliang	Mayor of Guangzhou; 2011 – 2016	Succeeded by Wen Guohui
