= Huang Xuchu =

- 黄旭初
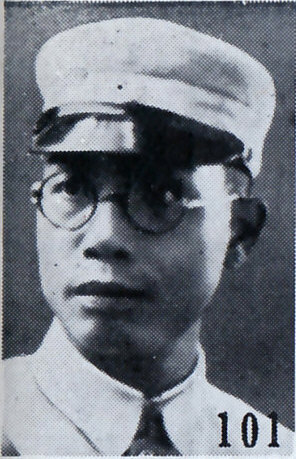

Chairman of the Guangxi Provincial Government
- In office 1942–1949
- Preceded by: Li Renren
- Succeeded by: Zhang Yunyi (as Chairman of Guangxi under CPC)
- Secretary-General: Huang Kunshan; Sun Renlin

Personal details
- Born: April 27, 1892 Rong County, Guangxi, Qing China
- Died: November 18, 1975 (aged 83) Kowloon, British Hong Kong
- Party: Kuomintang
- Education: Military University

Huang Xuchu (Chinese: 黄旭初; Wade–Giles: Huang Hsü-ch‘u; April 27, 1892 – November 18, 1975) was a Chinese politician and warlord, and one of the leaders of the New Guangxi clique. Compared to the other leaders of the clique, Li Zongren, Bai Chongxi and Huang Shaohong, he was considered the least powerful. Huang was the only one of the four leaders of the clique who did not leave for Taiwan or remain in China following 1949.

== Biography ==
Huang was born in Rong County in 1892. He graduated from the Republic of China Military University, and would later be promoted by Li Zongren. He served as the chairman of the Guangxi Provincial Government from 1942 until its collapse in 1949. He also concurrently served as a member of the Central Committee of the Kuomintang for 20 years. On July 19, 1947, the National Government appointed Huang Xuchu as the chairman of the Guangxi Electoral Office; the National Government also appointed him as a representative of the National Assembly and a legislator of the Legislative Yuan.

On February 5, 1949, Huang Shaohong and Huang Xuchu went to Nanjing to visit Li Zongren. Regarding the peace talks between the Kuomintang and Communists, Li and Bai Chongxi stated that dividing the country between the two factions would be the best outcome, Huang Shaohong believed that dividing the country was not possible. On February 8, Li Zongren ordered Huang Xuchu to deliver a letter from him to Guangzhou for Sun Fo, Wu Tiecheng and others. On May 25, Li Zongren appointed Huang Xuchu to be appointed as the deputy director of the Guilin Appeasement Office. On December 4, Li Zongren appointed Huang as the Deputy Chief of the Central China Military and Political Office. At the end of the year, entrusted by Li Zongren, he transferred to Hong Kong via Haikou, where he was ordered to secretly contact both the anti-Chiang and anti-Communist forces from Tsim Sha Tsui. Shortly afterwards, Wei Zhitang, former Director of the Finance Department of the Guangxi Provincial Government, relocated to Hong Kong and transferred the entire Guangxi Provincial Treasury into his personal possession. Wei's actions upset Huang, causing him to move to Yokohama, Japan in 1951. Huang Xuchu returned to Hong Kong in 1958 due to lack of funds, and lived in Shek Kip Mei. During this time he would sell semi-monthly magazines to make ends meet. At some point he was hired by the Nationalist government in Taiwan as a national policy consultant. He died on November 18, 1975, in Kowloon Baptist Hospital.
