= Liu Luyin =

Chinese politician (1894–1969)

Liu Luyin 刘芦隐
- Born: 1894; Yongfeng County, Jiangxi Province, Qing Empire
- Died: 1969 (aged 74–75)
- Other name: 刘芦隐
- Political party: Kuomintang; Chinese Communist Party

Liu Luyin (Chinese: 刘芦隐; pinyin: Liú Lúyǐn) (b. 1894 – 1969) was a Chinese politician of the Kuomintang and CCP in service to the Republic of China and the People's Republic of China.

== Biography ==
Liu Luyin was born in Yongfeng County, Jiangxi Province during the late Qing Empire

Liu attended school at Nanchang where he graduated from secondary school. He was thereafter admitted to Fudan University in Shanghai. He transferred abroad to the University of California where he earned his bachelor's degree in economics in 1921.

He became the editor-in-chief of the Young China Morning Post (少年中国晨报) and was appointed as the Director-General of the San Francisco Kuomintang Party Headquarters being also active at the party's Canadian branch. In 1922, he was transferred to Shanghai where he became active in the Kuomintang youth organizations at Shanghai University. He later became a professor at Fudan University. He became active in the KMT's information and propaganda wing under Chen Lifu but in 1936, he was purged from the party as a traitor though he escaped execution.

After Sichuan was taken by the Communists, Liu became a member of the Provincial Research Institute of Culture Librarians and a Wen Shi Guan Team Leader. In 1955, he was elected to the Sichuan Province CPPCC community working group.

Liu died in 1969 at Ya'an, Sichuan.
