= Battle of Rugao–Huangqiao =

1946 battle

Battle of Rugao-Huangqiao
- Part of the Chinese Civil War
Date	August 25, 1946 – August 31, 1946
Location	Jiangsu, China
Result	Communist victory

Belligerents
Flag of the National Revolutionary Army National Revolutionary Army	PLA People's Liberation Army

Commanders and leaders
Li Mo'an; Huang Baitao	Su Yu; Chen Yi

Strength
20,000	16,000

Casualties and losses
17,000+	Minor

The Battle of Rugao-Huangqiao (Ru Huang Zhangdou, 如黄战斗) took place between the communists and the nationalists during the Chinese Civil War in the post World War II era and resulted in communist victory. The battle was one of seven major battles in the Central Jiangsu Campaign.

Order of battle

- Nationalists
  - A regiment of the 79th Brigade
  - 99th Brigade of the Reorganized 69th Division
  - The 160th Brigade
  - The 187th Brigade
  - The Reorganized 25th Division
- Communists
  - The 1st Division
  - The 6th Division
  - The 5th Brigade
  - The Specialized Regiment

After battles fought at Dingyan (丁堰) and Linxin (林梓) in Central Jiangsu Campaign, the communists had severed the Rugao – Nantong Highway, and the nationalist 187th Brigade defending Rugao was isolated. To avert the situation, the nationalist 99th Brigade of the Reorganized 69th Division was ordered to be deployed from the Yellow Bridge (Huangqiao, 黄桥) Town to reinforce Rugao. Meanwhile, the nationalist Reorganized 25th Division deployed at Yangzhou and Jiangdu (江都) was ordered to attack Shaobo (邵伯) in the north. The communist, in response, ordered their 1st Division, 6th Division, 5th Brigade and the Specialized Regiment to attack Taizhou, Jiangsu from Dingyan (丁堰) and Linxin (林梓) regions, in the hope of luring the nationalist Reorganized 25th Division to abandon its attack on Shaobo (邵伯) and reinforce Taizhou, Jiangsu, so that it could be ambushed on its way. Although the communist plan succeeded in forcing the nationalists to abandon their attack on Shaobo (邵伯), the planned ambush of the nationalist Reorganized 25th Division failed to materialize. Instead, the nationalist 99th Brigade of the Reorganized 69th Division became the unfortunate victim.

In the morning of August 25, 1946, the nationalist 99th Brigade of the Reorganized 69th Division begun its march toward Rugao from Yellow Bridge (Huangqiao, 黄桥) Town, with nationalist 187th Brigade and a regiment of the nationalist 79th Brigade coming out of Rugao to meet their comrades-in-arms. By the noon, the nationalist 99th Brigade of the Reorganized 69th Division met the communist main force on the road from Yellow Bridge (Huangqiao, 黄桥) Town to Rugao. The communist 1st Division and 6th Division immediately launched their assault on the nationalists, successfully besieging the enemy in isolated pockets in the regions of Fenjie (分界) and Jiali (加力). The communists decided to concentrate their forces 4 to 5 times than that of their enemy to annihilate the weakest enemy first, and then the stronger one.

On August 26, 1946, the nationalist 99th Brigade of the Reorganized 69th Division at Fenjie (分界) region was first to be completely annihilated, and on the next day, the nationalist 187th Brigade and a regiment of the nationalist 79th Brigade at Jiali (加力) region was also annihilated completely. The victorious communists then launched their assault on Yellow Bridge (Huangqiao, 黄桥) Town, and remaining 5 companies of the nationalist 160th Brigade simply could not challenge the overwhelmingly superior enemy force, and gave up the town and surrendered. With the fall of Yellow Bridge (Huangqiao, 黄桥) Town, the nationalists was forced to cease their offensive to regroup for the next stage of the campaign and the battle ended.

== See also ==
- Outline of the Chinese Civil War
- National Revolutionary Army
- History of the People's Liberation Army
