= Zhu Senlin =

Chinese politician (1930–2026)

- 朱森林

Governor of Guangdong
- In office May 1991 – February 1996
- Preceded by: Ye Xuanping
- Succeeded by: Lu Ruihua

Mayor of Guangzhou
- In office August 1985 – June 1988
- Preceded by: Ye Xuanping
- Succeeded by: Yang Ziyuan

Personal details
- Born: October 1930 Chuansha County, Jiangsu, China (now in Pudong, Shanghai)
- Died: August 10, 2026 (aged 95) Guangzhou, Guangdong, China

Chinese name
- Chinese: 朱森林
Transcriptions
Standard Mandarin
- Hanyu Pinyin: Zhū Sēnlín
Yue: Cantonese
- Jyutping: Jyu1 Sam1 Lam4

Zhu Senlin (October 1930 – August 10, 2026) was a Chinese politician who was the sixth Governor of Guangdong in the history of the People's Republic of China and the mayor of Guangzhou. Born in Chuansha County, Jiangsu (now in Pudong, Shanghai), Zhu became the acting governor of Guangdong in 1991 and officially in 1993. Zhu died on August 10, 2026, at the age of 95.

Political offices
| Preceded by Ye Xuanping | Governor of Guangdong; 1991–1996 | Succeeded by Lu Ruihua |
| Preceded by Lin Ruo | Chairman of the Guangdong Provincial People's Congress; 1996–2001 | Succeeded by Zhang Guoying |
