= Liu Chi-wen =

Chinese politician

- 劉紀文
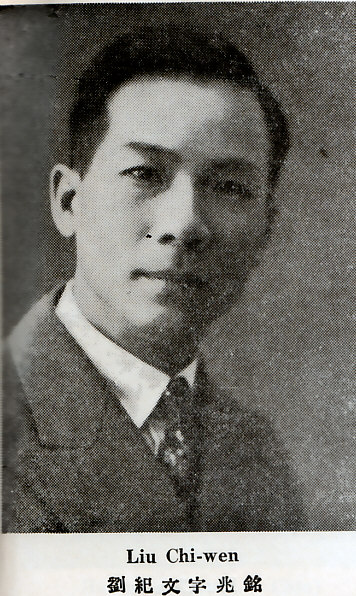

Personal details
- Born: 19 October 1890 Shunde, Guangzhou prefecture, Guangdong, Qing dynasty
- Died: 13 April 1957 (aged 66) Los Angeles, United States of America
Liu Chi-wen
- Traditional Chinese: 劉紀文
- Simplified Chinese: 刘纪文
Transcriptions
Standard Mandarin
- Bopomofo: ㄌㄧㄡˊㄐㄧˋㄨㄣˊ
- Wade–Giles: Liu^{2} Chi^{4}-wên^{2}
Yue: Cantonese
- Jyutping: Lau^{4} Gei^{2}-man^{4}

Liu Chi-wen (October 19, 1890 – April 13, 1957, from Guangzhou (Canton)), was a known follower of Dr. Sun Yat-sen, the founder of the Chinese Republic and the Chinese Nationalist Party (Kuomintang). He was educated in Japan, at the London School of Economics and at Cambridge University.

He was the Chief Secretary in Chiang Kai-shek’s Government. He was appointed the first Mayor of Nanjing in 1927 and also served from 1928-1930. He served as the first Mayor of Canton from 1932 to 1937. Roads, bridges and noted civic buildings that Liu was responsible for still stand; these include the Mausoleum of Sun Yat-sen in Nanjing and the Pearl River Bridge in Canton.

Liu was best man at the wedding of Chiang Kai-shek and Soong Mei-ling on December 1, 1927.

On October 18, 1928, he married Hsu Dzoh-tseng.

His death occurred on April 13, 1957 in Los Angeles.

== Liu Wen: Biography of a Revolutionary Leader ==
In 2005, Liu's family commissioned Betty Peh T’i Wei to compile a biography on Liu based on Liu’s diary and letters, and interviews with his wife, children and colleagues, as well as academic and general publications.

The 184-page titled Liu Chi-wen: Biography of a Revolutionary Leader was published privately by the Liu Chi-Wen family. "The Liu family expect that, by reading this book, the future generations may appreciate the kind of people Mr. and Mrs. Liu were and their contributions to their country and people. The readers may also gain an understanding of this unusual family, their traditional Chinese principles, and own Christian beliefs and values."

China（国民政府）

Political offices
Preceded by /	Mayor of Nanjing; May–August 1927	Succeeded by He Minhun (何民魂)
Preceded by He Minhun (何民魂)	Mayor of Nanjing; July 1928 - April 1930	Succeeded by Wei Tao-ming
Preceded by Cheng Tiangu (程天固)	Mayor of Guangzhou; January 1932 - July 1936	Succeeded by Zeng Yangfu
