= Politics of Guangdong =

Politics of Chinese province

The politics of Guangdong follows a dual party-government system like the rest of China's provinces. Guangdong is known for a surge of legislative activism in recent years, often called the Guangdong Phenomenon (Guangdong Xianxiang). The Guangdong Provincial People's Congress has enacted measures to increase democracy and transparency, and exert more control over the financial sector. In a well-publicized case in 2000, the Guangdong PPC also harshly criticized the Environmental Protection Bureau for allowing the construction of an electroplating park without a proper environmental impact investigation.

== List of Chinese Communist Party Committee Secretaries ==
=== First Secretary of the Southern China Bureau ===
No.	Portrait	Name	Took office	Left office
1	Ye Jianying (叶剑英)	Ye Jianying (叶剑英)	August 1949	July 1955

=== Secretary of the Provincial Committee ===
No.	Portrait	Name	Took office	Left office
1	Tao Zhu (陶铸)	Tao Zhu (陶铸)	July 1955	February 1965
2	Zhao Ziyang (赵紫阳)	Zhao Ziyang (赵紫阳)	February 1965	March 1967

=== Chair of the Provincial Revolutionary Committee ===
No.	Portrait	Name	Took office	Left office
1	Huang Yongsheng (黄永胜)	Huang Yongsheng (黄永胜)	February 1968	November 1969
2	Liu Xingyuan (刘兴元)	Liu Xingyuan (刘兴元)	November 1969	December 1972
3	Ding Sheng (丁盛)	Ding Sheng (丁盛)	December 1972	December 1973

=== First Secretary of the Provincial Committee ===
No.	Portrait	Name	Took office	Left office
1	Zhao Ziyang (赵紫阳)	Zhao Ziyang (赵紫阳)	April 1974	October 1975
2	Wei Guoqing (韦国清)	Wei Guoqing (韦国清)	October 1975	December 1978
3	Xi Zhongxun (习仲勋)	Xi Zhongxun (习仲勋)	December 1978	November 1980
4	Ren Zhongyi (任仲夷)	Ren Zhongyi (任仲夷)	November 1980	July 1985

=== Secretary of the Provincial Committee ===
No.	Portrait	Name	Took office	Left office
3	Lin Ruo (林若)	Lin Ruo (林若)	July 1985	January 1991
4	Xie Fei (谢非)	Xie Fei (谢非)	January 1991	March 1998
5	Li Changchun (李长春)	Li Changchun (李长春)	March 1998	November 2002
6	Zhang Dejiang (张德江)	Zhang Dejiang (张德江)	December 24, 2002	December 1, 2007
7	Wang Yang (汪洋)	Wang Yang (汪洋)	December 1, 2007	December 18, 2012
8	Hu Chunhua (胡春华)	Hu Chunhua (胡春华)	December 28, 2012	October 28, 2017
9	Li Xi (李希)	Li Xi (李希)	October 28, 2017	October 18, 2022
10	Huang Kunming (黄坤明)	Huang Kunming (黄坤明)	October 28, 2022	incumbent

== List of governors ==
No.	Officeholder	Term of office		Party	Ref.
No.	Officeholder	Took office	Left office	Party	Ref.
Governor of the Guangdong Provincial People's Government
1	Ye Jianying (1897–1986)	6 November 1949	September 1953	Chinese Communist Party	
2	Tao Zhu (1908–1969)	September 1953	February 1955	Chinese Communist Party	
Governor of the Guangdong Provincial People's Committee
(2)	Tao Zhu (1908–1969)	February 1955	August 1957	Chinese Communist Party	
3	Chen Yu (1901–1974)	August 1957	November 1967	Chinese Communist Party	
4	Huang Yongsheng (1910–1983)	November 1967	21 February 1968	Chinese Communist Party	
Director of the Guangdong Revolutionary Committee
(4)	Huang Yongsheng (1910–1983)	21 February 1968	June 1969	Chinese Communist Party	
5	Liu Xingyuan (1908–1990)	June 1969	April 1972	Chinese Communist Party	
6	Ding Sheng (1913–1999)	April 1972	April 1974	Chinese Communist Party	
7	Zhao Ziyang (1919–2005)	April 1974	October 1975	Chinese Communist Party	
8	Wei Guoqing (1913–1989)	October 1975	January 1979	Chinese Communist Party	
Governor of the Guangdong Provincial People's Government
9	Xi Zhongxun (1913–2002)	January 1979	March 1981	Chinese Communist Party	
10	Liu Tianfu (1908–2002)	March 1981	April 1983	Chinese Communist Party	
11	Liang Lingguang (1916–2006)	April 1983	August 1985	Chinese Communist Party	
12	Ye Xuanping (1924–2019)	August 1985	May 1991	Chinese Communist Party	
13	Zhu Senlin (1930–2026)	May 1991	9 February 1996	Chinese Communist Party	
14	Lu Ruihua (1938–2025)	10 February 1996	20 January 2003	Chinese Communist Party	
15	Huang Huahua (born 1946)	20 January 2003	4 November 2011	Chinese Communist Party	
16	Zhu Xiaodan (born 1953)	17 January 2012 (acting from 5 November 2011)	30 December 2016	Chinese Communist Party	
17	Ma Xingrui (born 1959)	23 January 2017 (acting from 30 December 2016)	27 December 2021	Chinese Communist Party	
18	Wang Weizhong (born 1962)	22 January 2022 (acting from 27 December 2021)	11 October 2025	Chinese Communist Party	
19	Meng Fanli (born 1965)	11 October 2025 (acting 11 October 2025)	Incumbent		

== List of chairmen of Guangdong People's Congress ==
1. Li Jianzhen (李坚真): 1979–1983
2. Luo Tian (罗天): 1983–1990
3. Lin Ruo (林若): 1990–1996
4. Zhu Senlin (朱森林): 1996–2001
5. Zhang Guoying (张帼英): 2001–2003
6. Lu Zhonghe (卢钟鹤): 2003–2005
7. Huang Liman (黄丽满): 2005 – January 2008
8. Ou Guangyuan (欧广源): January 2008 – January 2013
9. Huang Longyun (黄龙云): January 2013 – January 2017
10. Li Yumei (李玉妹): January 2017 – January 2022
11. Huang Chuping(黄楚平): January 2022 – present

== Chinese People's Political Consultative Conference ==
1. Tao Zhu (陶铸): 1955–1960
2. Ou Mengjue (区梦觉): 1960–1967
3. Wang Shoudao (王首道): 1977–1979
4. Yin Linping (尹林平): 1979–1983
5. Liang Weilin (梁威林): 1983–1985
6. Wu Nansheng (吴南生): 1985–1993
7. Guo Rongchang (郭荣昌): 1993–2003
8. Liu Fengyi (刘凤仪): 2003
9. Chen Shaoji (陈绍基): 2004 – April 2009
10. Huang Longyun: 2009–2013
11. Zhu Mingguo: 2013–2014
12. Wang Rong: 2015–present

== National Supervisory Commission ==
1. Shi Kehui (施克辉): 2018–2021
2. Song Fulong (宋福龙): 2021–present
