= Guangdong Provincial Committee of the Chinese People's Political Consultative Conference =

Guangdong Provincial Committee of the Chinese People's Political Consultative Conference 中国人民政治协商会议广东省委员会
- 13th
- Emblem of the Chinese People's Political Consultative Conference

Type
- Type: United front organ Constitutional convention (Historical); Legislature (Historical) of Chinese People's Political Consultative Conference

History
- Founded: January 1955; 71 years ago
- Preceded by: Guangdong Provincial People's Congress Consultative Committee

Leadership
- Chairperson: Lin Keqing

Website
- www.gdszx.gov.cn

Chinese name
- Simplified Chinese: 中国人民政治协商会议广东省委员会
- Traditional Chinese: 中國人民政治協商會議廣東省委員會
Transcriptions
Standard Mandarin
- Hanyu Pinyin: Zhōngguó Rénmín Zhèngzhì Xiéshāng Huìyì Guǎngdōngshěng Wěiyuánhuì

Abbreviation
- Simplified Chinese: 广东省政协
- Traditional Chinese: 广东省政協
- Literal meaning: CPPCC Guangdong Provincial Committee
Transcriptions
Standard Mandarin
- Hanyu Pinyin: Guǎngdōngshěng Zhèngxié

The Guangdong Provincial Committee of the Chinese People's Political Consultative Conference (Chinese: 中国人民政治协商会议广东省委员会) is the advisory body and a local organization of the Chinese People's Political Consultative Conference in Guangdong, China. it is supervised and directed by the Guangdong Provincial Committee of the Chinese Communist Party.

== History ==
The Guangdong Provincial Committee of the Chinese People's Political Consultative Conference traces its origins to the Guangdong Provincial People's Congress Consultative Committee (广东省各界人民代表会议协商委员会), founded in October 1950.

== List of chairpersons ==
Image	Name (English)	Name (Chinese)	Tenure begins	Tenure ends	Ref.
	Ye Jianying	叶剑英			
	Tao Zhu	陶铸	January 1955	September 1957	
	Wen Minsheng	文敏生	September 1957	September 1958	
	Wang De	王德	September 1958	December 1961	
	Ou Mengjue	区梦觉	December 1961	1966	
	Wang Shoudao	王首道	December 1977	December 1979	
	Yin Linping	尹林平	December 1979	April 1983	
	Liang Weilin	梁威林	April 1983	September 1985	
	Wu Nansheng	吴南生	September 1985	May 1991	
	Guo Rongchang	郭荣昌	May 1991	January 2003	
	Liu Fengyi	刘凤仪	January 2003	May 2003	
	Chen Shaoji	陈绍基	February 2004	January 2010	
	Huang Longyun	黄龙云	February 2010	January 2013	
	Zhu Mingguo	朱明国	January 2013	January 2015	
	Wang Rong	王荣	February 2015	January 2023	
	Lin Keqing	林克庆	January 2023		

== Term ==
=== 1st ===
- Term: January 1955–December 1960
- Chairperson: Tao Zhu
- Vice Chairpersons: Gu Dacun, Lin Liming, Zhang Wen, Du Guoxiang, Xu Chongqing, Ding Ying, Zhang Lucun, Rao Zhangfeng, Xiao Junying, Li Langru, Huang Jie (1957–), Yi Meihou (1957–)

=== 2nd ===
- Term: February 1959–December 1963
- Chairperson: Tao Zhu (–December 1960) → Ou Mengjue (December 1960–)
- Vice Chairpersons: Wen Minsheng, Wang De, Zhang Wen (died in November 1960), Du Guoxiang, Zhang Lucun, Luo Fanqun, Feng Shen, Gu Dacun, Deng Wenzhao, Xiao Junying, Li Langru, Huang Jie, Yi Meihou, Liang Guang (December 1960–), Huang Youmou (December 1960–), Yang Kanghua (November 1961–), Feng Naichao (November 1961–), Luo Jun (November 1961–), Luo Ming (November 1961–), Wang Yue (November 1961–)

=== 3rd ===
- Term: December 1963–December 1977
- Chairperson: Ou Mengjue
- Vice Chairpersons: Wang De, Zhang Lucun, Feng Shen, Feng Naichao, Xiao Junying, Yi Meihou, Huang Youmou, Luo Ming, Luo Jun, Wang Yue, Zhao Zhuoyun (September 1964–), Xiao Huanhui (September 1964–), Tan Tiandu (September 1964–), Yong Wentao (December 1965–)

=== 4th ===
- Term: December 1977–April 1983
- Chairperson: Wang Shoudao (–December 1979) → Yin Linping (December 1979–)
- Vice Chairpersons: Liu Tianfu, Yin Linping, Luo Fanqun, Guo Dihuo, Zhang Boquan, Liang Guang, Xiao Huanhui, Zhou Zhifei, Yun Guangying, Tan Tiandu, Xiao Junying, Yi Meihou, Huang Youmou, Luo Ming, Luo Jun, Wang Yue, Luo Xiongcai, Huang Kang (December 1979–), Wu Qiang (December 1979–), Liao Siguang (December 1979–), Zeng Tianjie (December 1979–), Wu Zhongxi (December 1979–), Guo Qiaoran (December 1979–), Hu Ximing (December 1979–), Chen Zupei (December 1979–), Chen Yilin (December 1979–), Wu Juetian (December 1979–), Diao Zhaofen (December 1979–), Zhou Nan (December 1979–May 22, 1980), Mo Xiong (December 1979–), Liu Xiangqing (December 1979–), Zuo Hongtao (March 1981–), Li Boqiu (March 1981–)

=== 5th ===
- Term: April 1983–January 1988
- Chairperson: Liang Weilin → Wu Nansheng
- Vice Chairpersons: Zheng Qun, Luo Jun, Wang Yue, Huang Kang, Liao Siguang, Zeng Tianjie, Wu Zhongxi, Guo Qiaoran, Hu Ximing, Chen Zupei, Chen Yilin, Wu Juetian, Diao Zhaofen, Zuo Hongtao, Li Boqiu, Li Jiezhi, Yang Yingbin (September 1985–), Qi Feng (September 1985–), He Baosong (September 1985–), Huang Yaoshen (September 1985–), Li Chen (September 1985–)

=== 6th ===
- Term: January 1988–February 1993
- Chairperson: Wu Nansheng
- Vice Chairpersons: Yang Yingbin, Zheng Qun, Qi Feng, Wang Pingshan, Huang Qingqu, He Baosong, Huang Yaoshen, Li Chen, Chen Zibin, Li Jinpei, Shen Yongchun, Zhang Zhanxia (March 1989–), Zeng Jinyi (March 1989–), Yang Kuizhang (March 1990–), Xiao Yaotang (1991–), Kuang Ji (January 1992–)

=== 7th ===
- Term: February 1993–January 1998
- Chairperson: Guo Rongchang
- Vice Chairpersons: Huang Hao, Li Chen, Xiao Yaotang, Li Jinpei, Shen Yongchun, Zhang Zhanxia, Zeng Jinyi, Lin Xingsheng, Huang Yaoshen (–December 1993), Zan Yunlong (February 1996–), Kang Leshu (February 1996–)

=== 8th ===
- Term: January 1998–January 2003
- Chairperson: Guo Rongchang
- Vice Chairpersons: Wang Zongchun, Liu Weiming, Li Jinpei, Zhang Zhanxia, Kang Leshu, Peng Yuxian, Han Dajian, Pan Jinpei, Wang Xunzhang, Lin Donghai

=== 9th ===
- Term: January 2003–January 2008
- Chairperson: Liu Fengyi (died May 9, 2003) → Chen Shaoji (February 2004–)
- Vice Chairpersons: Shi Anhai, Peng Yuxian (died May 29, 2006), Han Dajian, Wang Xunzhang, Wang Zhaolin, Zhu Xiaodan, Zhou Tianhong, Luo Fuhe, Yao Zhibin, Chen Weiwen

=== 10th ===
- Term: January 2008–January 2013
- Chairperson: Chen Shaoji (–April 2009) → Huang Longyun (February 2010–)
- Vice Chairpersons: Cai Dongshi, Liang Guoju, Tang Bingquan, Wang Xunzhang, Zhou Tianhong, Yao Zhibin, Chen Weiwen, Wen Lanzi, Wen Simei
- Secretary-General: Yang Dong

=== 11th ===
- Term: January 2013–January 2018
- Chairperson: Zhu Mingguo (–December 2014) → Wang Rong (January 2015–)
- Vice Chairpersons: Liang Weifa, Wang Xunzhang, Yao Zhibin, Chen Weiwen, Wen Lanzi, Wen Simei, Tang Hao, Liu Rizhi, Tao Kaiyuan
- Secretary-General: Yang Dong

=== 12th ===
- Term: January 2018–January 2023
- Chairperson: Wang Rong
- Vice Chairpersons: Lin Xiong, Liu Rizhi (–January 2019), Deng Haiguang, Yuan Baocheng, Huang Wu, Zhang Jiaji, Li Xin, Ma Guangyu, Zhang Shaokang (January 2019–), Zheng Zhentao (January 2020–), Xue Xiaofeng (January 2020–), Xu Ruisheng (January 2022–), Wen Guohui (January 2022–)
- Secretary-General: Wu Weipeng

=== 13th ===
- Term: January 2023–2028
- Chairperson: Lin Keqing
- Vice Chairpersons: Xu Ruisheng, Deng Haiguang, Yuan Baocheng, Wang Xuecheng, Huang Wu, Zhang Jiaji, Li Xin, Wen Guohui, Zheng Ke
- Secretary-General: Chen Wenming
