= Baocheng =

Baocheng may refer to:

- Baocheng, Hainan, a town in Hainan, China
- Baocheng, Mian, a township in Mian County, Shaanxi, China
- Baocheng River, a river of Hainan
- Ji Baocheng, Chinese educator
- Yuan Baocheng, Chinese politician and Mayor of Dongguan
