= Zhu Mingguo =

Chinese politician (born 1957)

Zhu Mingguo 朱明国

Chairman of the Guangdong Provincial Committee of the Chinese People's Political Consultative Conference
- In office January 2013 – November 2014
- Preceded by: Huang Longyun
- Succeeded by: Wang Rong

Deputy Party Secretary of Guangdong
- In office 2010 – November 2013
- Party Secretary: Wang Yang

Vice Governor of Hainan
- In office 1998–2001
- Governor: Wang Xiaofeng (汪啸风)

Personal details
- Born: May 1957 (age 69) Wuzhishan, Hainan
- Party: Chinese Communist Party (1975–2015, expelled)
- Education: Sun Yat-sen University; Central Party School of the Chinese Communist Party
- Occupation: Politician

Zhu Mingguo
- Traditional Chinese: 朱明國
- Simplified Chinese: 朱明国
Transcriptions
Standard Mandarin
- Hanyu Pinyin: Zhū Míngguó

Zhu Mingguo (born May 1957) is a former Chinese politician of Li ethnic heritage who spent his career in Guangdong, Hainan, and Chongqing. Zhu was an alternate member of 18th Central Committee of the Chinese Communist Party. He was investigated by the Chinese Communist Party's anti-corruption agency in November 2014. Previously he served as the chairman of the Guangdong Provincial Committee of the Chinese People's Political Consultative Conference. He has become the second senior Party and government official to be investigated in Guangdong in six months, following Wan Qingliang, former Party chief of Guangzhou.

Chinese media reported that he had close relations with Wen Qiang, who served as his deputy when he was the director of the Chongqing Municipal Bureau of Public Security.

In 2016, Zhu Mingguo was sentenced to death with reprieve for bribery.

== Biography ==
Zhu was born to an ordinary family of peasants near the city of Wuzhishan on Hainan island in May 1957, a member of the Li ethnic group. He graduated from Sun Yat-sen University in 1984, majoring in law. Then he was accepted to Central Party School of the Chinese Communist Party as a part-time student, and graduated in 1988.

Zhu began his political career in August 1974, and joined the Chinese Communist Party in October 1975.

He served in various posts in Baoting County (currently Baoting Li and Miao Autonomous County), before serving as Deputy Head of Organization Department of CPC Hainan Committee.

In 1993 he became the CPC Party Chief of Wenchang County, one year later, he concurrently served as the County Governor; he was re-elected in 1995.

He was promoted to Vice-Governor of Hainan in 1998, he was a member of the party's Hainan Provincial Standing Committee. He remained in that positions until 2001, when he was transferred to Chongqing and appointed the director of the Chongqing Municipal Bureau of Public Security and a member of the standing committee of the Chongqing Municipal Committee of the CPC.

Zhu was transferred to Guangdong in 2006, where he served as Secretary of the Guangdong Provincial Discipline Inspection Commission and a member of the party's Provincial Standing Committee, the highest de facto policy-making body of the province. He was promoted again to become Deputy Party Secretary of Guangdong in 2010, a position he held until November 2013. In January 2013, he began concurrently serving as the province's top 'political advisor', Chairing the Guangdong Provincial People's Political Consultative Conference, a largely ceremonial post.

On November 28, 2014, state media reported that Zhu was being investigated by the Central Commission for Discipline Inspection (CCDI) for "serious violations of laws and regulations". On February 17, 2015, at the conclusion of the CCDI investigation, Zhu was expelled from the Communist Party. The investigation concluded that Zhu had abused his power and said that he had taken "massive bribes" as kickbacks for giving preferential treatment in the promotions of officials in the operations of some businesses. It also curiously accused Zhu of "severely violating the family planning (i.e., one-child) policy." As bribery constituted a criminal offense, his case was moved to judicial authorities for prosecution.

On November 11, 2016, Zhu was sentenced by the Liuzhou Intermediate People's Court to death sentence with reprieve for taking bribes worth 141 million yuan (~$20.50 million) and unidentified 91.04 million yuan (~$13.24 million) property.
