= Politics of Shenzhen =

The politics of Shenzhen in Guangdong province in the People's Republic of China is structured in a dual party-government system like all other governing institutions in mainland China.

The mayor of Shenzhen is the highest-ranking official in the People's Government of Shenzhen or Shenzhen Municipal Government. However, in the city's dual party-government governing system, the mayor has less power than Chinese Communist Party Committee Secretary of Shenzhen, colloquially termed the "CCP Party Chief of Shenzhen" or "Communist Party Secretary of Shenzhen".

== List of mayors of Shenzhen ==
No.	English name	Chinese name	Took office	Left office	Notes
1	Jia Hua	贾华	23 January 1979	17 June 1980	

=== After Shenzhen was designated as a Special Economic Zone ===
No.	English name	Chinese name	Took office	Left office	Notes
1	Wu Nansheng	吴南生	17 June 1980	6 March 1981	
2	Liang Xiang	梁湘	15 October 1981	12 August 1985	
3	Li Hao	李灏	12 August 1986	23 May 1990	
4	Zheng Liangyu	郑良玉	23 May 1990	17 November 1992	
5	Li Youwei	厉有为	17 November 1992	23 May 1995	
6	Li Zibin	李子彬	23 May 1995	18 June 2000	
7	Yu Youjun	于幼军	18 June 2000	17 June 2003	
8	Li Hongzhong	李鸿忠	17 June 2003	3 June 2005	
9	Xu Zongheng	许宗衡	3 June 2005	June 2009	
10	Wang Rong	王荣	June 2009	June 2010	
11	Xu Qin	许勤	June 2010	April 2017	
12	Chen Rugui	陈如桂	July 2017		

== List of CCP Party secretaries of Shenzhen ==
No.	English name	Chinese name	Took office	Left office	Notes
1	Zhang Xunfu	张勋甫	23 January 1979	17 June 1980	

=== After Shenzhen was designated as a Special Economic Zone ===
No.	English name	Chinese name	Took office	Left office	Notes
1	Wu Nansheng	吴南生	17 June 1980	6 March 1981	
2	Liang Xiang	梁湘	6 March 1981	15 May 1986	
3	Li Hao	李灏	15 May 1986	April 1993	
4	Li Youwei	厉有为	April 1993	January 1998	
5	Zhang Gaoli	张高丽	January 1998	16 December 2001	
6	Huang Liman	黄丽满	17 December 2001	17 March 2005	
7	Li Hongzhong	李鸿忠	17 March 2005	November 2007	
8	Liu Yupu	刘玉浦	September 2008	April 2010	
9	Wang Rong	王荣	April 2010	March 2015	
10	Ma Xingrui	马兴瑞	26 March 2015	30 December 2016	
11	Xu Qin	许勤	30 December 2016	1 April 2017	
12	Wang Weizhong	王伟中	1 April 2017		

== Laws ==
The city government introduced a good samaritan law in 2013, which intends to protect potential good samaritans from being scammed by people pretending to be victims. This was the first such law passed by a municipal government in mainland China. In 2020 the city passed the "Shenzhen Special Economic Zone Regulations on the Comprehensive Ban on Wild Animals", effective May 1 of that year, which also banned eating cats, dogs, and several other species, also making it the first in mainland China.

Paid leave became legally required in November 2020.
