= National Supervisory Commission =

Highest supervisory and anti-corruption authority of China

National Supervisory Commission of the People's Republic of China 中华人民共和国国家监察委员会
- National emblem

Agency overview
- Formed: 23 March 2018

Jurisdictional structure
- National agency: China
- Operations jurisdiction: China
- Governing body: National People's Congress

Operational structure
- Headquarters: No 1 Zhengyi Road, Dongcheng, Beijing, China
- Elected officer responsible: Liu Jinguo, Director

Website
- www.12388.gov.cn (whistleblowing portal) ccdi.gov.cn

National Supervisory Commission of the People's Republic of China
- Simplified Chinese: 中华人民共和国国家监察委员会
- Traditional Chinese: 中華人民共和國國家監察委員會
Transcriptions
Standard Mandarin
- Hanyu Pinyin: Zhōnghuá Rénmín Gònghéguó Guójiā Jiānchá Wěiyuánhuì

Commonly abbreviated as
- Simplified Chinese: 国家监委
- Traditional Chinese: 國家監委
Transcriptions
Standard Mandarin
- Hanyu Pinyin: Guójiā Jiānwěi

The National Supervisory Commission of the People's Republic of China is the country's highest state supervisory and anti-corruption authority. It is co-located with the Central Commission for Discipline Inspection of the Chinese Communist Party (CCP).

The National Supervisory Commission was formed in 2018 by an amendment to the Constitution as the merger of the Ministry of Supervision, the National Bureau of Corruption Prevention, and the Supreme People's Procuratorate's General Administration of Anti-Corruption and Bribery. Its tasks include monitoring policy implementation, investigating official malfeasance, and deciding administrative sanctions among civil servants. The NSC's jurisdiction includes all public sector employees as well as village officials whether or not they are CCP members.

The Commission holds the same constitutional status as that of the State Council, of the Supreme People's Court, and of the Supreme People's Procuratorate. The National Supervisory Commission is co-located with the CCP's CCDI, the party's supreme supervisory and disciplinary body, and the NSC effectively functions as the CCDI's state arm.

== Background ==
The National Supervisory Commission was formed as part of a series of reforms to China's anti-corruption system during the first term of Xi Jinping as General Secretary of the Communist Party.

The imperial Chinese supervision system originated in the Qin and Han dynasties. The names and structures of the supervisory offices varied. These offices aimed to uphold justice, enforce discipline and supervise government ethics. To achieve these goals, government officials periodically investigated, conducted visits and reported cases of impeachment to emperors.

After the 1911 Revolution, the founder of the Republic of China, Sun Yat-sen advocated a five-power constitution. Drawing from the Western separation of powers (three branches: a legislature, an executive, and a judiciary), he added another two traditional Chinese government powers, examination and supervision (control), to propose the Five-Power Constitution. The Constitution of the Republic of China was promulgated in 1947 which made the Control Yuan a parliamentary chamber until the reforms of 1991 which it became the sole auditory body in Taiwan.

While the Communist Party had institutionalized internal mechanisms for combating corruption in some form since its founding and the establishment of the People's Republic of China in 1949, it was apparent that it was largely ineffective at curbing systemic corruption, and otherwise had no legal basis, as the main organ tasked with combating corruption and malfeasance, the Central Commission for Discipline Inspection, was a party organ, not a state one.

Prior to Xi's anti-corruption campaign, offenses were often prosecuted at the direction of local party authorities through their control of local Commissions for Discipline Inspection (CDIs) and procuratorial organs. While these authorities theoretically reported to their superior commissions at the next higher level of administration (i.e. the municipal organ would report to the provincial one, the provincial organ would report into the CCDI), in addition to answering to the local party leadership, in reality the local CDIs only answered to local party leaders, as they controlled the budgets, personnel, and resources of these organizations. This often led to arbitrary exercise of power and political selectiveness in the targets of corruption efforts.

== History ==
In late 2016, pilot initiatives of the Supervisory Commissions (SCs) began in Shanxi, Beijing and Zhejiang. Provincial level chiefs of Discipline Inspection began serving concurrently as heads of the local Supervisory Commissions.

In February 2018, an amendment to the constitution was proposed to make national and local supervision commissions official state organs. Local commissions will be appointed by local peoples' congresses at county and higher level and will be accountable to them and to the supervision commission at the higher level. The amendment was passed on 11 March 2018 and went into effect on the same date.

On 17 March 2018, three state agencies with inspection powers (the Ministry of Supervision, the National Bureau of Corruption Prevention, and the Supreme People's Procuratorate's General Administration of Anti-Corruption and Bribery) were merged to form the new National Supervisory Commission. The formation of the National Supervisory Commission centralized control of anti-corruption resources to the central authorities and was aimed at curbing local interference in anti-corruption efforts.

== Functions ==
The National Supervisory Commission is designated as a political body. Its tasks include monitoring policy implementation, investigating official malfeasance, and deciding administrative sanctions among civil servants. The NSC's jurisdiction includes all public sector employees as well as village officials whether or not they are Chinese Communist Party (CCP) members. Evidence it gathers is admissible in court proceedings (previously, prosecutors had to conduct independent investigations to gather evidence after a case was referred by the Central Commission for Discipline Inspection). The National Supervisory Commission is co-located with the CCP's Central Commission for Discipline Inspection and shared its resources. Additionally, the two agencies share a website.

== Organization ==
According to the 2018 Constitution, the Director of the National Supervisory Commission is elected by the National People's Congress and shall not serve more than two consecutive terms. The Director reports to the National People's Congress and the National People's Congress Standing Committee. The deputy directors and Members of the commission are nominated by the Director and are appointed by the National People's Congress Standing Committee.

== See also ==
- Anti-corruption campaign under Xi Jinping
- Central Leading Group for Inspection Work
- Commission Against Corruption (Macau)
- Corruption in China
- Independent Commission Against Corruption (Hong Kong)
