= Liang Guoying =

Chinese politician (born 1958)

- 梁国英

Executive Vice-Mayor of Dongguan
- In office December 2011 – September 2014
- Mayor: Yuan Baocheng

Vice-Mayor of Dongguan
- In office April 2004 – December 2011

Personal details
- Born: August 1958 (age 68) Humen Town, Dongguan, Guangdong, China
- Party: Chinese Communist Party (1984–2014; expelled)
- Spouse: Guo Yanming
- Education: Central Party School of the Chinese Communist Party

Chinese name
- Traditional Chinese: 梁國英
- Simplified Chinese: 梁国英
Transcriptions
Standard Mandarin
- Hanyu Pinyin: Liáng Guóyīng
Yue: Cantonese
- Jyutping: Loeng^{4} Gwok^{3}-jing^{1}

Liang Guoying (Chinese: 梁国英; born August 1958) is a former Chinese politician from Dongguan, an important industrial city in the Pearl River Delta of south China's Guangdong province. Liang had sexual relationships with many women.

== Career ==
Liang was born and raised in Humen Town of Dongguan, Guangdong. In September 2004 he graduated from Central Party School of the Chinese Communist Party, majoring in law.

He got involved in politics in July 1980 and joined the Chinese Communist Party in October 1984.

Beginning in 1980, he served in several posts in Dongguan, including deputy director, director, and CPC Party Chief. He became the Vice-Mayor of Dongguan in April 2004, he was re-elected in January 2008. In December 2011, he was promoted to become the Executive Vice-Mayor of Dongguan.

== Downfall ==
On May 8, 2014, he was being investigated by the Central Commission for Discipline Inspection for "serious violations of laws and regulations". On September 5, 2014, he was dismissed from his posts and expelled from the Chinese Communist Party.

In October 2015, he stood trial at the Intermediate People's Court of Huizhou on charges of taking bribes. On December 30, he was sentenced to 15 years and fined 8 million yuan for taking bribes.

In December 2017, his wife, Guo Yanming (郭艳明; born April 1962), an accountant of Dongguan Radio and TV Station, was sentenced to eight years and six months and fined one million yuan for taking bribes and shielding or concealing the illegal gain.
