= Tao Kaiyuan =

Vice-President of the Supreme People's Court (born 1964)

- 陶凱元

Justice of the Second Rank

Vice-President of the Supreme People's Court
- Incumbent
- Assumed office 28 December 2013
- President: Zhou Qiang; Zhang Jun

Personal details
- Born: March 1964 (age 62) Hunan, Xingtan, China
- Party: China Association for Promoting Democracy
- Education: Wuhan University Bachelor of Law (1985); Wuhan University Master of Law (1988); Wuhan University Doctor of Law (2000); University of British Columbia Legal Training (2003)
- Occupation: Justice
- Profession: International law

Tao Kaiyuan (Chinese: 陶凱元; born March 1964) is a Chinese judge, Justice of the Second Rank, vice-chairperson of the Central Committee of the China Association for Promoting Democracy, vice-president of the Supreme People's Court, and a member of the Adjudication Committee of the Supreme People's Court. She graduated from the Wuhan University School of Law with a Doctor of Law specialising in international law. Tao once served as the vice-president of the High People's Court of Guangdong Province, director of the Guangdong Intellectual Property Office, and vice-chairperson of the Guangdong Provincial Committee of the Chinese People's Political Consultative Conference.

== Life ==
In 1981, Tao Kaiyuan was admitted into the Wuhan University School of Law, specialising in International law. In 1988, she received her bachelor's degree and was transferred to teach in the Economic Law Department in Jinan University. In 1993, Tao served as the Deputy Director of the Department of Law of Jinan University. In December 1995, she was promoted to associate professor. In 1999, she was appointed as the vice-president of the High People's Court of Guangdong Province. In 2000, she received her Master of Law degree from Wuhan University and was promoted to professor in Jinan University. From September 2002 to September 2003, Tao went to the University of British Columbia in Canada to further her studies.

In July 2006, Tao Kaiyuan joined the China Association for Promoting Democracy. In 2007, Tao was elected as the vice chairperson of the Guangdong Provincial Committee of the China Association for Promoting Democracy. In March 2008, Tao served as the director of the Guangdong Intellectual Property Office. In 2012, she was elected as a member of the Standing Committee of the Central Committee of the China Democratic Progressive Party and chairperson of the Guangdong Provincial Committee. In January 2013, Tao was elected as the vice-chairperson of the Guangdong Provincial Committee of the Chinese People's Political Consultative Conference. On 11 February 2015, Tao resigned from her duties as vice-chairperson of the Guangdong Provincial Committee of the Chinese People's Political Consultative Conference.

On 28 December, 2013, the Standing Committee of the 12th National People's Congress appointed Tao Kaiyuan as the vice-president of the Supreme People's Court.

Tao is also a member of the 13th and 14th National Committee of the Chinese People's Political Consultative Conference.
