= Shenzhen Capital Group =

China Venture Capital firm

Shenzhen Capital Group Co., Ltd
- Native name: 深圳市创新投资集团有限公司
- Company type: State-owned enterprise
- Industry: Venture Capital
- Founded: 1999
- Headquarters: Shenzhen, China
- Key people: Ni Zewang (Chairman); Zuo Ding (President)
- Products: Investments
- AUM: US$65 billion (2023)
- Website: www.szvc.com.cn

Shenzhen Capital Group Co., Ltd (SCGC; Chinese: 深圳市创新投资集团有限公司; pinyin: Shēnzhènshì chuàngxīn tóuzī jítuán yǒuxiàn gōngsī) is a state-owned venture capital company based in Shenzhen, China. It is affiliated with the Shenzhen Government and its investments cover industries supported by national policies. According to South China Morning Post, from January 2019 to May 2020, it was the second most active venture capital firm in China.

== Background ==
SCGC was established by the Shenzhen Government in 1999. The firm is considered one of China's most active investors in hard technology. Most of its investments are in Chinese companies. More than 200 companies in its portfolio have gone public.

== Notable investments ==
- Desktop Metal
- Semiconductor Manufacturing International Corporation
- Jinko Solar
- BGI Group
- NetDragon Websoft
- Xiami Music Network
- Formlabs
- Makeblock
- Le Vision Pictures
