= Yanoda =

Protected rainforest in Hainan, China

- Yanoda logo
- Interactive map of Yanoda
- Location: Baoting Li and Miao Autonomous County, Hainan, China
- Website: http://www.yanoda.com/

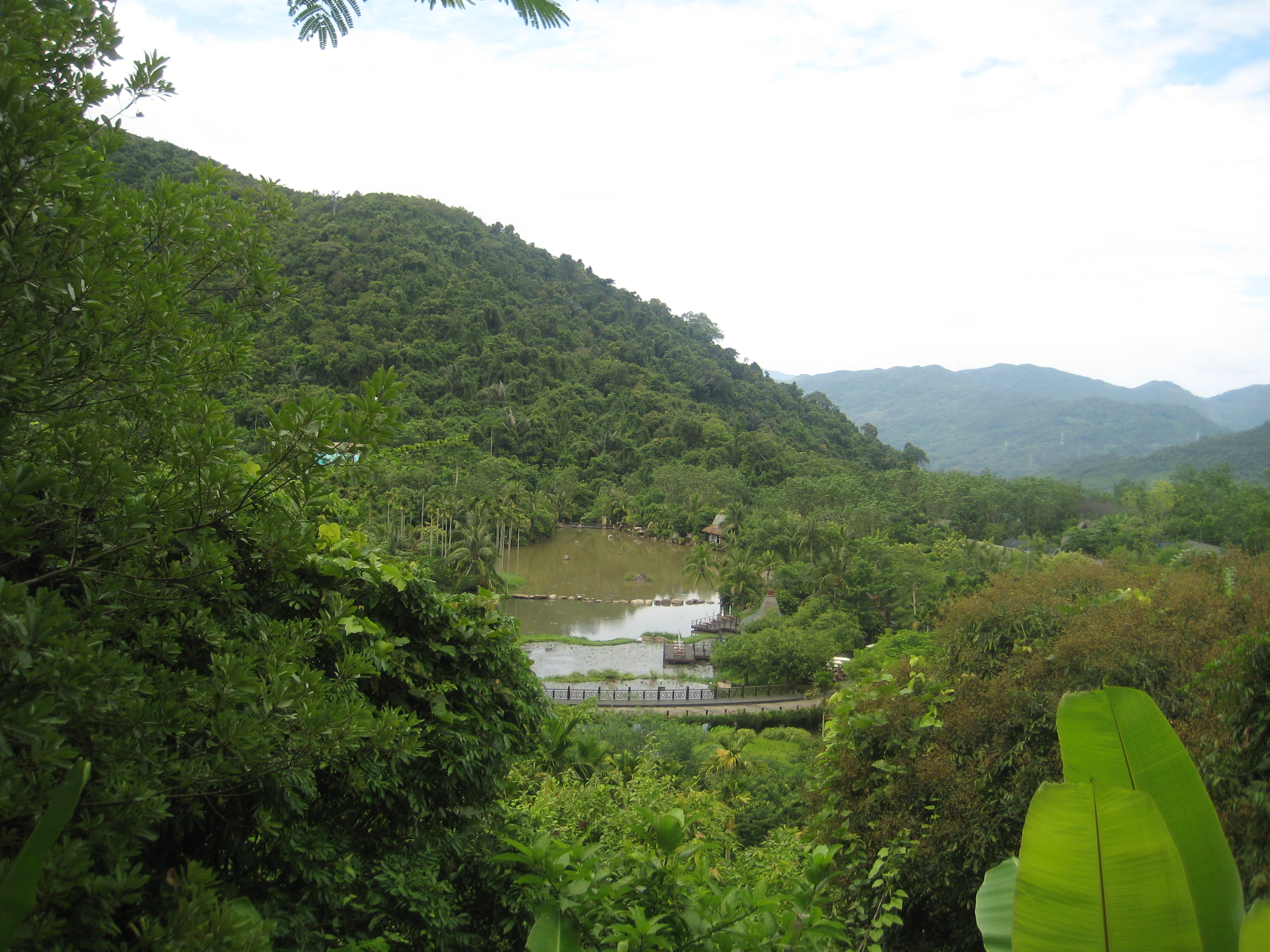
Yanoda rainforest

Yanoda (Chinese: 呀诺达) is a rainforest in Baoting Li and Miao Autonomous County, Hainan, China. The rainforest is a major tourist attraction (as Yanoda Rainforest Cultural Tourism Zone) and is located near the town Sanya.

The Chinese government plans to invest 3.9 billion renminbi into the park area. 45 km^{2} of the forest are reserved for the Cultural Tourist Zone, the whole area of protected forest is 123 km^{2}. In 2012, the Tourist Zone was rated a AAAAA-scenic spot.
