= Co-located office =

Chinese Communist Party structure

Co-located office (Chinese: 合署办公; pinyin: Hé shǔ bàngōng) is a form of organizational structure within the administrative system of the Chinese Communist Party (CCP) and the government of the People's Republic of China. It involves two CCP and government agencies with different organizational structures and responsibilities working in the same location due to similar work objectives, nature of their work, or other reasons. The personnel and resources of both agencies can be flexibly utilized as needed under the unified command and dispatch of a higher authority; however, the leadership teams and staff of the two agencies may not completely overlap. The difference between a co-located office and "one institution with two names" is that under co-located office operation, the two agencies maintain their independent legal person status.

== Examples ==
=== Co-located office of discipline inspection and supervision organs ===
Since 1993, the central and local governments at all levels have set up administrative supervision departments in accordance with the Regulations on Administrative Supervision of the People's Republic of China. The Central Commission for Discipline Inspection of the and the Ministry of Supervision worked together, and the deputy secretary of the Central Commission for Discipline Inspection served concurrently as the minister of the Ministry of Supervision. The discipline inspection commissions of the CCP in each province, city, county and district worked together with the government supervision bureaus (departments). Often, a member of one of the eight minor "democratic parties" or a non-CCP member is appointed as the deputy director of the supervision bureau. Such a non-CCP member cannot serve as the deputy secretary of the discipline inspection commission. In 2017, Shanxi, Beijing and Zhejiang successively established provincial-level national supervision organs. The director of the newly established provincial-level supervision commissions is the secretary of the CCP discipline inspection commission at the same level, and the deputy directors include the deputy secretary of the CCP discipline inspection commission at the same level and the leaders of the procuratorate. They work together with the discipline inspection commission and the people's procuratorate. Following the institutional reforms of 2018, the Central Commission for Discipline Inspection and the National Supervisory Commission began to operate under a co-located office, and local discipline inspection commissions also began to operate under a co-located office with their respective local supervisory commissions.

=== Other situations ===
In some places, two agencies with similar responsibilities are combined into one office. For example, the Foshan Municipal Social Work Committee Office (Social Work Office) and the Foshan Municipal Spiritual Civilization Construction Committee Office (Spiritual Civilization Office) are combined into one office.

Some enterprises and institutions also have similar organizational structures. On August 29, 2014, the board of directors of China Construction Bank approved the establishment of the "Asset Management Department" at the head office. The Asset Management Department and the Investment Banking Department work together in the same office. The name of the department working together is "Asset Management Department (Investment Banking Department)".

== See also ==
- Organization of the Chinese Communist Party
