= Lin Keqing =

Chinese politician

- 林克庆

Chairman of the Guangdong Provincial Committee of the Chinese People's Political Consultative Conference
- Incumbent
- Assumed office 13 January 2023
- Preceded by: Wang Rong

Party Secretary of Guangzhou
- In office 3 December 2021 – 16 June 2023
- Deputy: Guo Yonghang (mayor)
- Preceded by: Zhang Shuofu
- Succeeded by: Guo Yonghang

Personal details
- Born: October 1966 (age 59–60) Mianyang County, Hubei, China
- Party: Chinese Communist Party
- Education: Renmin University of China

Chinese name
- Simplified Chinese: 林克庆
- Traditional Chinese: 林克慶
Transcriptions
Standard Mandarin
- Hanyu Pinyin: Lín Kèqìng

Lin Keqing (Chinese: 林克庆; born October 1966) is a Chinese politician, currently serving as chairman of the Guangdong Provincial Committee of the Chinese People's Political Consultative Conference.

Lin was a representative of the 18th and is a member of the 20th National Congress of the Chinese Communist Party. He is an alternate of the 20th Central Committee of the Chinese Communist Party. He is a member of the 14th National Committee of the Chinese People's Political Consultative Conference.

== Early life and education ==
Lin was born in Mianyang County (now Xiantao), Hubei, in October 1966. In 1984, he was accepted to Renmin University of China, where he majored in commodity science.

== Career ==
After University in 1988, Lin became an official in the CCP Beijing Dongcheng District Committee. He joined the Chinese Communist Party (CCP) in December 1990. There, he eventually became vice governor in 1994 and was admitted to standing committee member of the CCP Beijing Dongcheng District Committee, the district's top authority, in 2001. He was assigned to the similar position in Daxing District in 2005. He served as governor of Daxing District from October 2005 to March 2008, and party secretary, the top political position in the district, from February 2008 to February 2013. Lin was appointed vice mayor of Beijing in 2013 and admitted to standing committee member of the CCP Beijing Municipal Committee, the city's top authority, in 2016.

In December 2019, Lin was transferred to south China's Guangdong province, where he was made executive vice governor and a standing committee member of the CCP Guangdong Provincial Committee, the province's top authority. In December 2021, he succeeded Zhang Shuofu as party secretary of Guangzhou, capital of Guangdong. In January 2023, he took office as chairman of the Guangdong Provincial Committee of the Chinese People's Political Consultative Conference, the provincial advisory body.

Government offices
Preceded by Wang Huimin	Governor of Daxing District; 2005–2008	Succeeded by Li Changyou
Preceded by Zhang Gong	Executive Vice Mayor of Beijing; 2019–2019	Succeeded by Cui Shuqiang
Preceded by Lin Shaochun	Executive Vice Governor of Guangdong; 2019–2021	Succeeded by Zhang Hu
Party political offices
Preceded by Shen Baochang	Party Secretary of Daxing District; 2008–2013	Succeeded by Li Changyou
Preceded by Gou Zhongwen	Secretary of the Education Work Committee of the CCP Beijing Municipal Committee; 2016–2018	Succeeded by Wang Ning
Preceded by Zhang Shuofu	Party Secretary of Guangzhou; 2021–2023	Succeeded by Guo Yonghang
Assembly seats
Preceded by Wang Rong	Chairman of the Guangdong Provincial Committee of the Chinese People's Political Consultative Conference; 2023–present	Incumbent
