= Beijing Municipal Supervisory Commission =

The Beijing Municipal Supervisory Commission (Chinese: 北京市监察委员会), or Supervisory Commission of Beijing Municipal is a provincial-level local state supervisory authority in Beijing, co-located with the Discipline Inspection Committee of the Beijing Municipal Committee of the Chinese Communist Party. It was established in January 2017 to assume the functions of the former Beijing Municipal Supervisory Bureau. The director of the Beijing Municipal Supervision Commission is elected by the Beijing Municipal People's Congress and is accountable to both the Congress and its Standing Committee, as well as the Supervision Commission of the People's Republic of China.

== History ==
On December 25, 2016, the 25th meeting of the Standing Committee of the 12th National People's Congress (NPC) voted to approve the Decision regarding the implementation of pilot work for the reform of the State Supervision System in Beijing Municipality, Shanxi Province, and Zhejiang Province. The Decision mandates the formation of supervisory committees in the aforementioned three provinces (cities) and the counties, cities, and municipal districts within their jurisdiction to wield supervisory authority. The pertinent functions of the Supervision Department (Bureau) of the People's Government in pilot areas, the Bureau of Corruption Prevention, and the departments of the People's Procuratorates responsible for investigating and addressing corruption, bribery, dereliction of duty, and the prevention of job-related crimes are to be consolidated into the Supervisory Committees. Supervisory committees in the pilot regions will be elected and overseen by the corresponding people's congresses and will be accountable to them. The head of the Supervisory Committee shall be elected by the corresponding people's congress; the deputy heads and members of the Supervisory Committee shall be appointed or dismissed by the head of the Supervisory Committee upon the request of the Standing Committee of the corresponding People's Congress. It delineates the authorities and responsibilities of the Supervisory Committee.

In January 2017, provinces, autonomous regions, and municipalities directly under the Central Government executed the local regime transition, including the Beijing Municipal People's Congress, which elected the director, deputy director, and members of the provincial (municipal) Supervisory Committee. Zhang Shuofu, secretary of the CCP Commission for Discipline Inspection, was elected as the director of the Supervisory Committee.
