= Zhang Shuofu =

Chinese politician

- 张硕辅

Party Secretary of Guangzhou
- In office 20 July 2018 – 3 December 2021
- Preceded by: Ren Xuefeng
- Succeeded by: Lin Keqing

Personal details
- Born: August 1965 (age 61) Wangcheng County, Hunan, China
- Party: Chinese Communist Party
- Education: Wuhan College of Hydraulic Engineering

Zhang Shuofu (Chinese: 张硕辅; born August 1965) is a Chinese politician, and the Party Secretary of Guangzhou from 2018 to 2021. A Hunan native with a background in waterworks, Zhang's political career seemingly took off in 2015, being assigned a succession of prominent roles around the country. He is currently a deputy chairman of the Guangdong People's Congress.

== Biography ==
Zhang was born in Wangcheng County, Hunan. He joined the Chinese Communist Party in August 1984. He graduated from the Wuhan College of Hydraulic Engineering (now part of Wuhan University) with a bachelor's, then master's degree. He later obtained a doctorate degree at Hunan University in environmental science engineering.

Zhang spent most of his career in the hydroelectric industry, going through a series of engineering and administrative jobs. In June 1995 he took up a job in flood prevention in his home province. In April 1997 he was assigned to work in the provincial department of water works. In April 2000 he was promoted to deputy director. In March 2003, he took on his first full-time political job as Chinese Communist Party Deputy Committee Secretary of Yiyang. In December 2006, he became provincial director of water works. In March 2008 he became Mayor of Loudi. In June 2011, he became party chief of Yongzhou. In January 2013, he became Vice Governor of Hunan.

Beginning in 2015, Zhang's career saw significant growth. In April 2015, he was named a member of the provincial party standing committee of Yunnan province and head of the provincial discipline inspection commission, taking on his first post outside of his home province. In January 2017 he took over from Li Shulei as head of the discipline inspection commission of Beijing. On July 20, 2018, he was named party chief Guangzhou.

In December 2021, he stepped down as Secretary of the Guangzhou Municipal Committee. In January 2022, he was elected Vice Chairman of the Standing Committee of the Guangdong Provincial People's Congress.

On 8 October 2026, it was announced that Zhang was suspected of "serious violation of law and discipline" and is currently under investigation by the Central Commission for Discipline Inspection (CCDI) and the National Supervisory Commission.

Party political offices
Preceded by Ren Xuefeng	Party Secretary of Guangzhou	Succeeded by Lin Keqing
Preceded by Li Shulei	Secretary of the CCP Beijing Municipal Commission of Discipline Inspection; January 2017-July 2018	Succeeded by Chen Yong
Preceded by Xin Weiguang	Secretary of the CCP Yunnan Province Disciplinary Inspection Committee; April 2015-January 2017	Succeeded by Lu Junhua
Preceded by Huang Tianxi	Party Secretary of Yongzhou	Succeeded by Chen Yong
New title	Director of the Beijing Municipal Supervisory Commission; January 2017 - July 2018	Succeeded by Chen Yong
Government offices
Preceded by Lin Wu	Mayor of Loudi Municipal People's Government; April 2008-June 2011	Succeeded by Yi Pengfei
Preceded by Wang Xiaozhong	Director, Hunan Provincial Water Resources Department; December 2006-March 2008	Succeeded by Dai Yongjun
