= Baocheng, Hainan =

Baocheng 保城
- Town
- Location in Hainan
- Coordinates: 18°38′35″N 109°41′58″E
- Country: China
- Province: Hainan
- Autonomous county: Baoting

Area
  - Total: 178 km^{2} (69 sq mi)

Population (2020)
  - Total: 37,492
  - Density: 211/km^{2} (546/sq mi)
- Time zone: UTC+8 (China Standard)

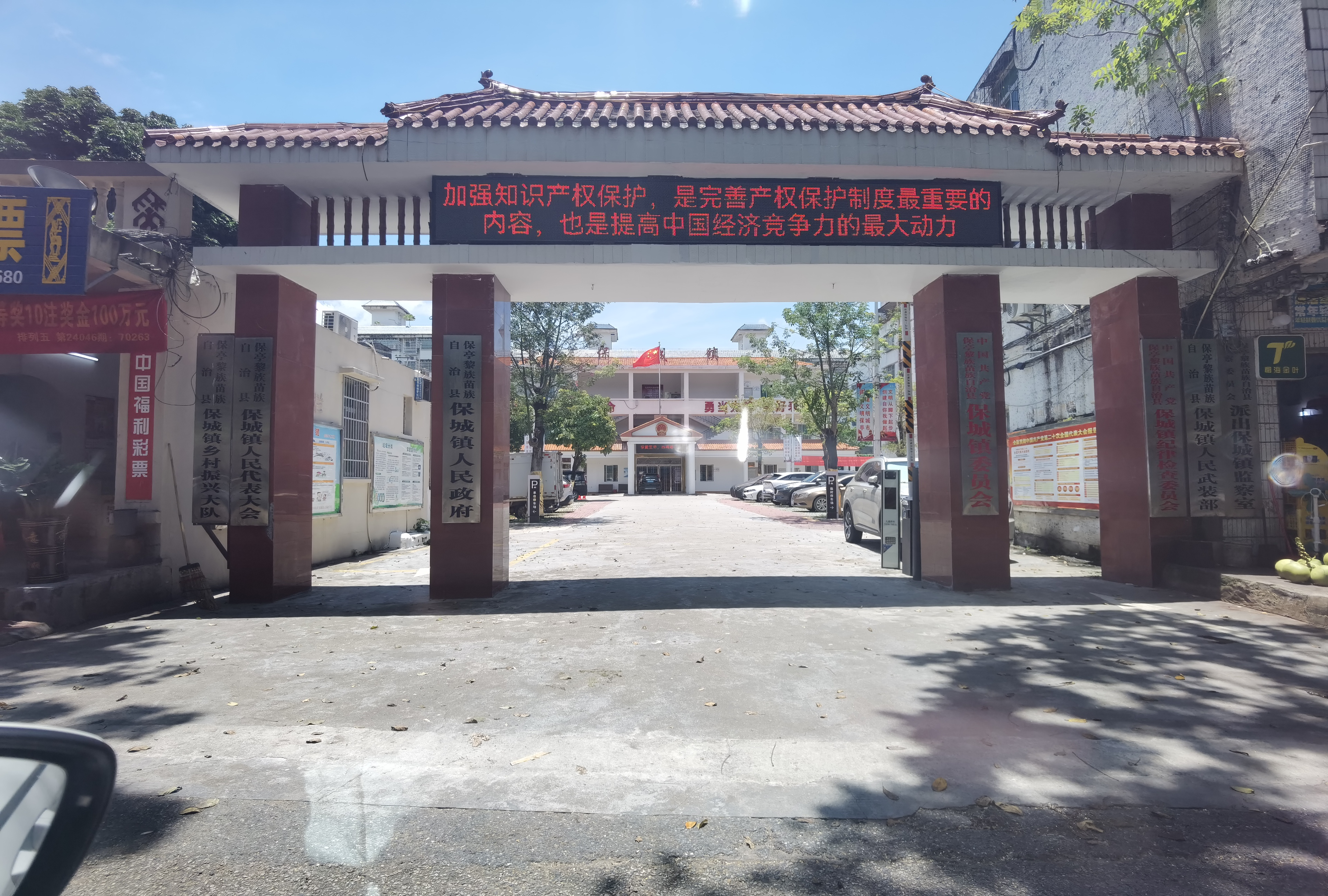
Entrance to Baocheng City People’s Government of Baoting Li and Miao Autonomous County government building

Baocheng (simplified Chinese: 保城镇; traditional Chinese: 保城鎮; pinyin: Bǎochéng Zhèn) is a town in southern Hainan, China, to the north of Sanya. It is the county seat of Baoting Li and Miao Autonomous County. The Baocheng River flows through the town. The area is home to the Baocheng people, who belong to the Qi people of the Li ethnic group. The town spans an area of 178 square kilometres (69 mi^{2}), and has a population of 37,492, per a 2020 government publication.

== Geography ==
Baocheng is located in the northeast of Baoting Li and Miao Autonomous County, 39 kilometres (24 mi) from Wuzhishan, and 75 kilometres (47 mi) from Sanya. About 63,000 mu of the town's area is forested, and 15,727 mu is arable.

== Administrative divisions ==
Baocheng administers three residential communities (Chinese: 社区; pinyin: shèqū) and eight administrative villages (Chinese: 行政村; pinyin: xíngzhèng cūn).

=== Residential communities ===
Baocheng administers the following three residential communities:

- Chengbei Community (Chinese: 城北社区)
- Chengnan Community (Chinese: 城南社区)
- Rezuo Community (Chinese: 热作社区)

=== Villages ===
Baocheng administers the following eight administrative villages:

- Chaokang Village (Chinese: 抄抗村)
- Fanwen Village (Chinese: 番文村)
- Shihao Village (Chinese: 什好村)
- Maojie Village (Chinese: 毛介村)
- Shipin Village (Chinese: 什聘村)
- Xipo Village (Chinese: 西坡村)
- Chuntian Village (Chinese: 春天村)
- Shidong Village (Chinese: 石硐村)

== Demographics ==
As of 2020, the town's population is 37,492, comprising 13,128 households. Of this, 22,383 people (59.70%) are ethnically Li, and 1,430 (3.81%) are ethnically Miao.
