= Wu Nansheng =

Chinese politician (1922–2018)

- 吴南生

Chairman of the Guangdong Provincial Committee of the Chinese People's Political Consultative Conference
- In office 1985–1993
- Preceded by: Liang Weilin
- Succeeded by: Guo Rongchang

First Party Secretary of Shenzhen
- In office 1980–1981
- Preceded by: Zhang Xunfu
- Succeeded by: Liang Xiang

Personal details
- Born: August 1922 Chaoyang, Guangdong, China
- Died: 10 April 2018 (aged 95)
- Party: Chinese Communist Party
- Education: Central Party School of the Chinese Communist Party

Wu Nansheng (Chinese: 吴南生; August 1922 – 10 April 2018) was a Chinese Communist revolutionary and reformist politician. A stalwart proponent of the reform and opening policy after the end of the Cultural Revolution, he proposed the establishment of free trade zones in his native Guangdong Province. He served as Chinese Communist Party Committee Secretary and Mayor of Shenzhen and spearheaded the early development of the nascent special economic zone. He later served as Chairman of the Guangdong Provincial Committee of the Chinese People's Political Consultative Conference (CPPCC) from 1985 to 1993.

== Early life and career ==
Wu was born in August 1922 in Chaoyang County (now Chaoyang District of Shantou), Guangdong Province. He joined the Anti-Japanese Volunteer Army in October 1936, and the Chinese Communist Party in April 1937. He served in the local party committee in eastern Guangdong during most of the Second Sino-Japanese War, and went to study at the CCP Central Party School in Yan'an in 1944. After the surrender of Japan at the end of World War II, he was sent to work in Jilin Province in the former Japanese puppet state of Manchukuo. When the People's Liberation Army took over South China in the Chinese Civil War, Wu was appointed vice-mayor of Nanchang, the capital of Jiangxi Province, in 1949.

After the founding of the People's Republic of China, Wu served as CCP Deputy Committee Secretary of his hometown Shantou and deputy party secretary of Hainan Prefecture. After 1955 he worked in the South China division and then the South-Central division of the CCP Central Committee. When the Cultural Revolution began in 1966, he was dismissed from his positions, but was politically rehabilitated in 1971.

== Reform and opening ==
After the end of the Cultural Revolution, Wu was appointed Chinese Communist Party Deputy Committee Secretary of Guangdong Province in 1977, and then CCP Committee Secretary in 1978, serving under Xi Zhongxun, the First Secretary of the province. He was a stalwart supporter of the reform and opening policy. When he visited Shantou in 1979 after decades of absence, he was so appalled by the terrible living standards in his hometown that he thought the conditions were comparable to those during the Kuomintang period which had motivated him to become a Communist in the 1930s. In an interview with official media, he said that Shantou was still a prosperous trading city in the early Communist era, not much behind Hong Kong in development. But thirty years later, Shantou had grown poorer while Hong Kong's economy had taken off. He was convinced that economic reform was the only way forward.

Wu proposed the establishment of a free trade zone in Shantou to resuscitate its economy, an idea endorsed by Xi Zhongxun, who lobbied the national government for more economic freedom for the entire province. Partly because of their effort, Beijing decided to establish the special economic zone (SEZ) of Shenzhen. Wu served as Director of the Guangdong SEZ Administration Committee from May 1980 to July 1983, and was concurrently the CCP Committee Secretary and Mayor of Shenzhen from September 1980 to March 1981, spearheading the early development of the nascent city. He was succeeded by Liang Xiang.

In September 1985, Wu was appointed Chairman of the Guangdong Provincial Committee of the Fifth Chinese People's Political Consultative Conference (CPPCC) and served a second term until January 1993. After his retirement from leadership positions, he focused on raising funds for Project Hope to build schools in poverty-stricken rural areas.

== Retirement and death ==
Wu retired in September 2004. He died on 10 April 2018 in Guangzhou, at the age of 95.

Government offices
Preceded by Liang Weilin	Chairman of the Guangdong Provincial Committee of the Chinese People's Political Consultative Conference; 1985–1993	Succeeded by Guo Rongchang
