= Wuhan University School of Law =

Law school in Wuhan, Hubei, China

Coordinates: 30.539292°N 114.37113°E

- 武汉大学法学院
- Established: 1926
- Dean: Xiao Yongping
- Academic staff: 132
- Location: Wuhan, Hubei, China
- Website: law.whu.edu.cn/English/Home.htm

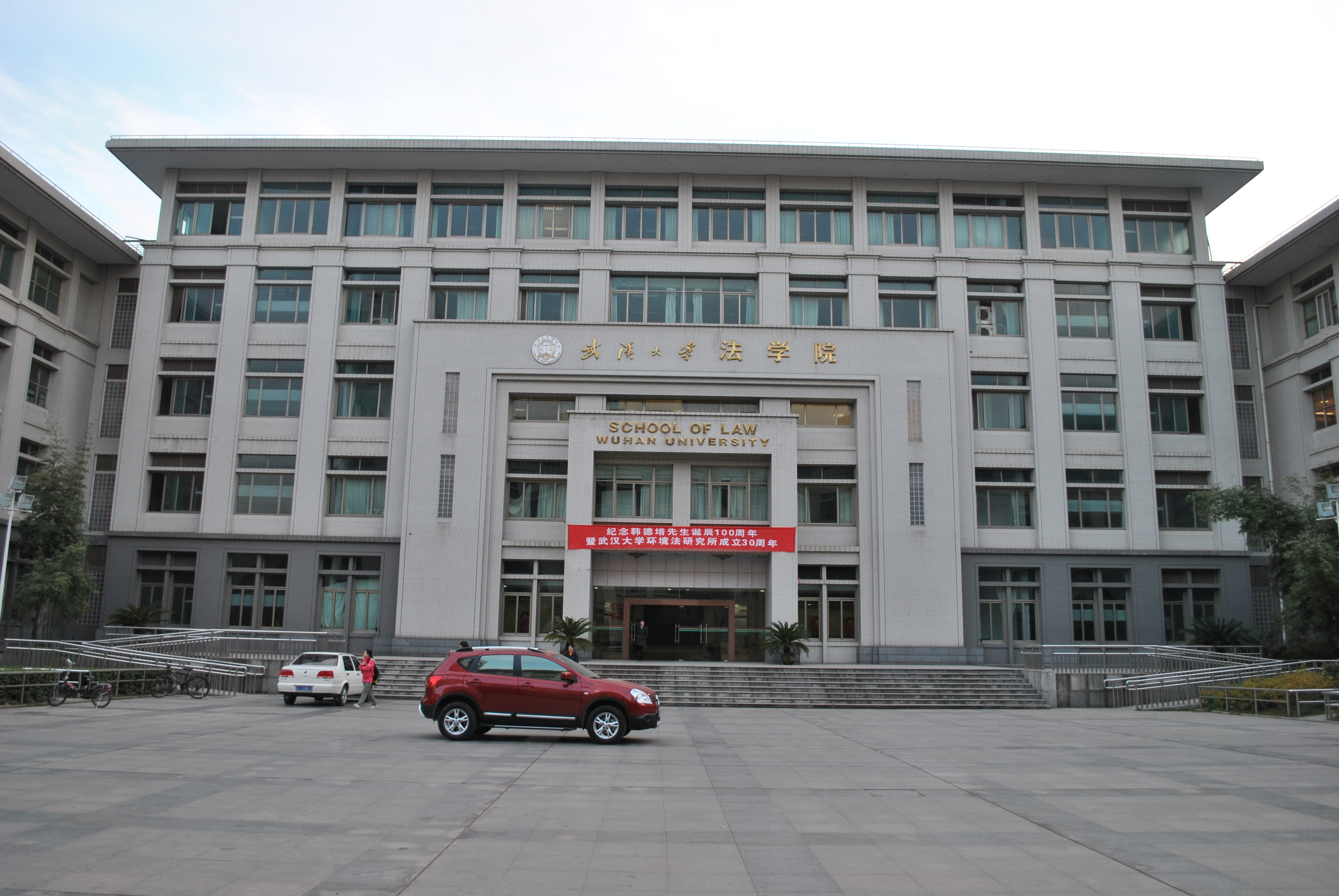
New building of the School of Law

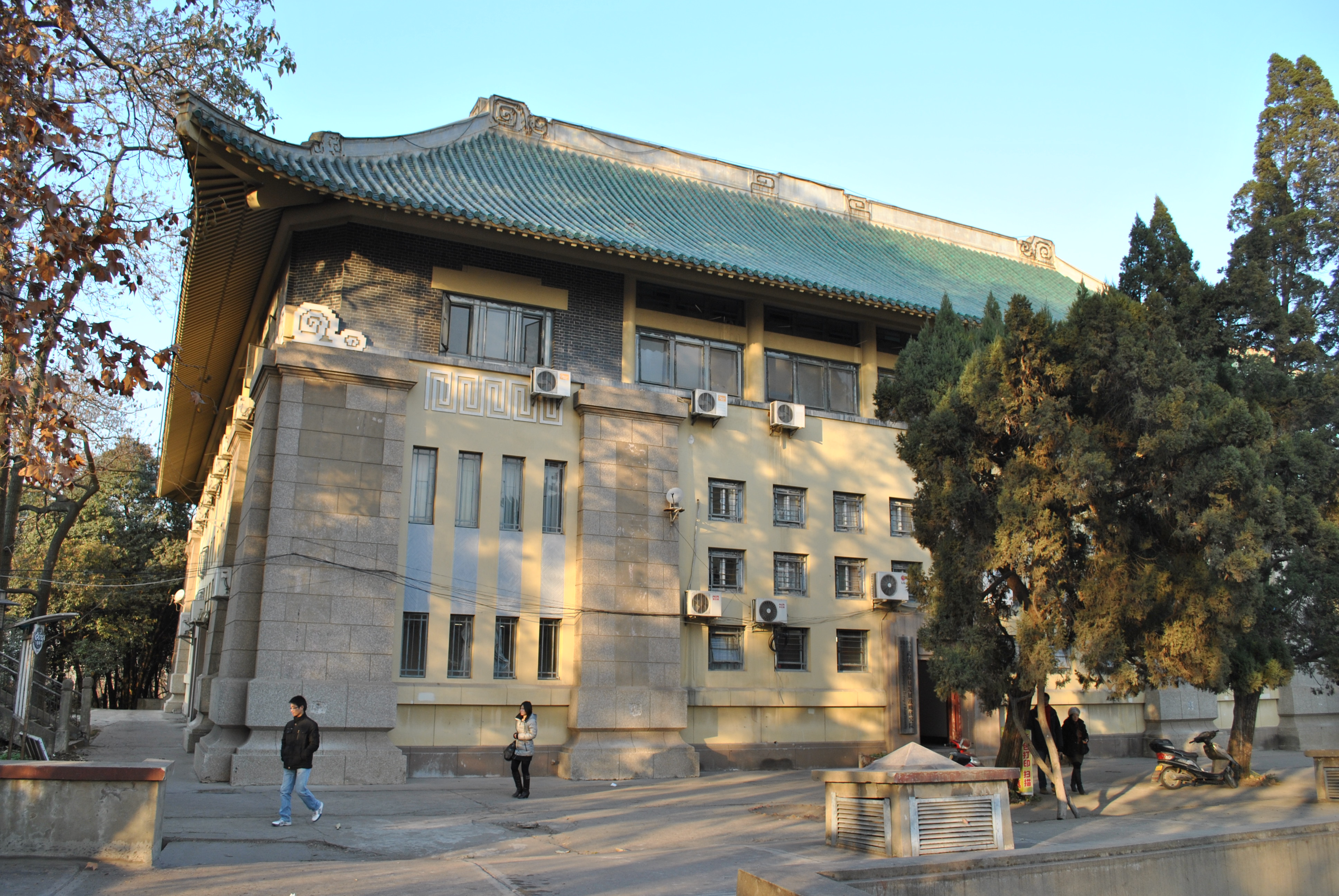
Original building of the School of Law

Wuhan University School of Law is the law school of Wuhan University in Wuhan, China. The School of Law was oft-referred as one of the "Four Famous Law Schools" in China, and one of the "four departments and five colleges," representing the highest level of legal education in China. According to a 2009 evaluation conducted by the Chinese Ministry of Education, Wuhan Law was ranked the 3rd among the law schools in China, tied with Peking University. Both its undergraduate and graduate programs are ranked the 3rd in China by Wu Shulian.

== History ==
- In 1909, the law school was first established as the Wuchang University of Law.
- In 1926, the school was incorporated into Wuchang Zhongshan University, which later became National Wuhan University in 1928.
- In 1949, Hankou Law School, a private institution, merged with the law department.
- In 1958, Department of Law of Wuhan University was removed from the main campus and merged into Hubei University along with Zhongnan College of Finance, Zhongnan College of Law, and Zhongnan School of Politics and Law.
- In 1979, Wuhan University reestablished its law department.
- In 1986, Department of Law was renamed as School of Law.

== Overview ==
- Faculty
  - 132 faculty members and staff
    - 49 professors
    - 30 associate professors
    - 48 Doctors mentors
- Students
  - 2000+ graduate students
  - 1000+ undergraduate students
- Degrees granting
  - Doctor
  - Master
  - Post-doctor
  - Bachelor

== Notable faculty and alumni ==
- Wang Shijie
- Zhou Gengsheng
- Mei Ju-ao：one of the judges in Tokyo Trial.
- Wan Exiang: Vice President of the Supreme People's Court of China. He received his B.A degree from Wuhan University in 1980, LL.M. degree from Yale Law School in 1987 and LL.D. degree from Wuhan University School of Law in 1988. After graduation, he joined the faculty of Wuhan University. Wan was elected as the vice president of the Intermediate People's Court of Wuhan in 1996, vice president of the High People's Court of Hubei in 1999, and Vice President of the Supreme People's Court of China in 2000. He was elected as Vice President of the Revolutionary Committee of the Kuomintang in 2002.
- Karim Massimov: Prime Minister of Kazakhstan.
- Zhang Jun: incumbent Chief Justice of the Supreme People's Court of China.

== See also ==
- School of Law, Wuhan University
