= Shanxi Provincial Supervisory Commission =

The Shanxi Provincial Supervisory Commission (Chinese: 山西省监察委员会), abbreviated as Shanxi Supervisory Commission (Chinese: 山西省监委, is a provincial-level local state supervisory authority in Shanxi Province, People's Republic of China, situated alongside the Discipline Inspection Committee of the Shanxi Provincial Committee of the Chinese Communist Party.

== Historical Overview ==
On December 25, 2016, the 25th meeting of the Standing Committee of the 12th National People's Congress (NPC) voted to approve the Decision regarding the implementation of pilot work for the reform of the State Supervision System in Beijing Municipality, Shanxi Province, and Zhejiang Province. The Decision mandates the formation of supervisory committees in the aforementioned three provinces (cities) and the counties, cities, and municipal districts within their jurisdiction to wield supervisory authority. The pertinent functions of the Supervision Department (Bureau) of the People's Government in pilot areas, the Bureau of Corruption Prevention, and the departments of the People's Procuratorates responsible for investigating and addressing corruption, bribery, dereliction of duty, and the prevention of job-related crimes are to be consolidated into the Supervisory Committees. Supervisory committees in the pilot regions will be elected and overseen by the corresponding people's congresses and will be accountable to them. The head of the Supervisory Committee shall be elected by the corresponding people's congress; the deputy heads and members of the Supervisory Committee shall be appointed or dismissed by the head of the Supervisory Committee upon the request of the Standing Committee of the corresponding People's Congress. It delineates the authorities and responsibilities of the Supervisory Committee.

On January 19, 2017, the Shanxi Provincial Supervisory Committee was officially established, becoming the first provincial-level supervisory committee in China.
