= Xu Zongheng =

Chinese politician (born 1955)

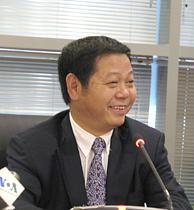
- Born: July 1955 (age 71)
- Occupation: former mayor
- Status: Imprisonment
- Criminal charges: Corruption
- Penalty: Death penalty

Xu Zongheng (simplified Chinese: 许宗衡; traditional Chinese: 許宗衡; pinyin: Xǔ Zōnghéng; born July 1955) is a Chinese politician who was the mayor of Shenzhen, Guangdong, China from June 2005 to June 2009. During his term of service, an agreement was reached on the Shenzhen-Hong Kong Innovation Circle to develop both cities into a metropolis.

Xu was born in Xiangtan, Hunan province. In June 2009, Xu was placed under investigation for "severe violations" and later dismissed from the mayor position. Sources reported that Xu was allegedly involved in the corruption scandal involving Gome Electrical Appliances founder, Huang Guangyu.

Xu has been replaced as mayor by Wang Rong.

In May 2011, Xu was convicted of taking 33.18 million yuan (~$5.4 million) in bribes and sentenced to death with a two-year reprieve by the Zhengzhou People's Intermediate Court in Henan province. The court ruling read, "Xu took advantage of his posts and received bribes or gifts [...] from Shenzhen Shunjia Hi-tech Construction Materials, Yu Weiliang, former party boss of Shenzhen's Longgang District, and seven other companies or individuals alter government land planning, win bids for construction projects, get promotions and advance their personal interests."
