= Ou Mengjue =

Chinese politician (1906–1992)

Ou Mengjue (simplified Chinese: 欧梦觉; traditional Chinese: 歐夢覺; pinyin: Ōu Mèngjué; Jyutping: Au1 Mung6-gok3 (1906–1992) was a People's Republic of China politician. She was born in Nanhai, Guangdong Province. She was CPPCC Committee Chairperson of her home province. She was a delegate to the 1st National People's Congress and 3rd National People's Congress.

Preceded by Tao Zhu	CPPCC Committee Chairperson of Guangdong	Succeeded by Wang Shoudao
