= Wang Rong (politician) =

Chinese politician (born 1958)

- 王荣
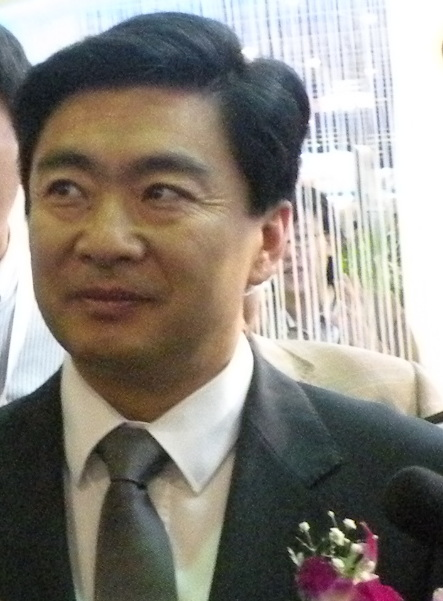
- Wang Rong in 2008

Chairman of the Guangdong Provincial Committee of the Chinese People's Political Consultative Conference
- In office February 10, 2015 – January 13, 2023
- Preceded by: Zhu Mingguo
- Succeeded by: Lin Keqing

Party Secretary of Shenzhen
- In office April 10, 2010 – March 26, 2015
- Deputy: Xu Qin (mayor)
- Preceded by: Liu Yupu (刘玉浦)
- Succeeded by: Ma Xingrui

Party Secretary of Suzhou
- In office October 2004 – August 2009
- Preceded by: Wang Min
- Succeeded by: Jiang Hongkun

Party Secretary of Wuxi
- In office February 2003 – November 2004
- Preceded by: Jiang Dingzhi
- Succeeded by: Yang Weize

Personal details
- Born: April 1958 (age 67–68) Binhai County, Jiangsu, China
- Party: Chinese Communist Party

Wang Rong (simplified Chinese: 王荣; traditional Chinese: 王榮; pinyin: Wáng Róng; born April 1958) is a Chinese politician who has served in prominent regional posts in Jiangsu and Guangdong provinces. He is currently serving as chairman of the Guangdong Provincial Committee of the Chinese People's Political Consultative Conference, a mostly ceremonial political advisory body.

Wang spent much of his career in his native Jiangsu province. He has an academic background in the field of agriculture. He served successively as the Chinese Communist Party Committee Secretary of the cities of Wuxi and Suzhou in Jiangsu, before being transferred in 2010 to serve as acting mayor, then Party Secretary of Shenzhen, a position he served in until 2015. Wang was an alternate of the 17th and 18th Central Committees of the Chinese Communist Party (CCP).

== Career ==
=== Early life and academic career ===
Born in 1958 in Binhai County, in northern Jiangsu province, Wang worked in a rural commune in the latter years of the Cultural Revolution. He joined the Chinese Communist Party in 1976, the year Mao died. He became part of the first batch of students to return to school after China's higher education system was dismantled as part of the Cultural Revolution.

Wang spent much of his earlier career in academia. He enrolled in Nanjing Agricultural College and earned a degree in agriculture and economic management in 1982. He continued his studies for the next six years, earning a master's, then a doctorate in his field. By 1989, he became a lecturer at the university, and then an associate dean in the economics and trade school. He then became assistant to the school's president. In 1991 he earned the opportunity to study abroad at Tilburg University in the Netherlands. In 1992 he returned to China and served as the chief administrator for the university's president, before becoming Vice President of the University.

=== Jiangsu ===
Wang entered the Jiangsu provincial government in the late 1990s. At the turn of the century, Wang received a series of quick promotions to progressively senior positions. After serving a two-year tenure in the Agricultural Science Institute of Jiangsu, Wang went on to become deputy director of the provincial department of agriculture. In 2000, ostensibly due to his academic background, he was transferred to head the provincial department of education. In 2001, he was again transferred, this time to take on the post of acting Mayor of Wuxi; he was formally elected mayor in 2002. In 2003, he was again promoted to become the city's Communist Party Secretary, which was, in reality, the city's top political office. By 2004, only four years since serving as deputy director of the department of agriculture, he earned a seat on the provincial Party Standing Committee, the province's top decision making body, joining the inner circle of the Jiangsu political elite and becoming one of the province's top-ranked politicians.

=== Guangdong ===
In June 2009, Wang left his native Jiangsu province to take on the office of the acting Mayor of Shenzhen, a metropolis next to Hong Kong and known to be China's most successful Special Economic Zone. Wang replaced Xu Zongheng, who was dismissed for corruption. He was quickly promoted to party secretary the next year, and also earned a spot on the Guangdong provincial Party Standing Committee, serving under party secretary Wang Yang. Shenzhen's political landscape experienced rapid changes as a result of then-CCP General Secretary Xi Jinping's anti-corruption campaign, culminating in the abrupt dismissal of Jiang Zunyu, the city's former Political and Legal Affairs Commission Secretary.

In late 2014, rumours that Wang was "in trouble" circulated widely, largely due to speculation that the Guangdong political scene was due for a 'reshuffle' following the abrupt dismissal of Wan Qingliang, a once-popular Cantonese politician who was serving as party secretary of the provincial capital Guangzhou. Various media outlets speculated that Wang would be transferred out of his job in Shenzhen for a lower-profile position in the Ministry of Education or in Anhui province, or be given a ceremonial role so he could keep his rank and benefits but be removed from a position of actual political power.

In February 2015, Wang was elected chairman of the Guangdong Provincial Committee of the Chinese People's Political Consultative Conference (CPPCC), a largely ceremonial legislative consultation body. He replaced Zhu Mingguo, a former top provincial official who, like Wang's Shenzhen mayoral predecessor Xu Zongheng, had also been dismissed for corruption. Even though this was technically a promotion as it made Wang an official with full provincial-ministerial rank, many observers characterized the move as having transferred Wang away from the political centre stage. Leading positions in the CPPCC in Chinese provinces are largely seen as so-called "political retirement home", bestowed to officials of advanced age as an honour for their service in government but considered to be largely a position without actual political power. At the same time, Wang became dogged by corruption rumours as the media speculated that Wang was actually being 'deposed' as part of a wider anti-corruption campaign targeting associates of ex-CCP general secretary Jiang Zemin. When Wang formally stepped down as Shenzhen party secretary at a meeting of the municipal leadership on March 28, news footage showed tears in Wang's eyes as well as awkwardness and pessimism about Wang's expression. He was replaced by Ma Xingrui.

== Family ==
According to numerous Chinese-language media outlets, Wang is the nephew of Wang Yeping, wife of former Paramount leader and CCP General Secretary Jiang Zemin, although some political insiders from Shenzhen have dismissed this as a baseless rumour. Nevertheless, he was widely considered to be a protege of Jiang, who is also from Jiangsu province.

Party political offices
Preceded by Liu Yupu (刘玉浦)	Party Secretary of Shenzhen; 2010–2015	Succeeded by Ma Xingrui
Preceded by Wang Min	Party Secretary of Suzhou; 2004–2009	Succeeded by Jiang Hongkun
Preceded by Jiang Dingzhi	Party Secretary of Wuxi; 2003–2004	Succeeded by Yang Weize
Government offices
Preceded by Wu Xinxiong	Mayor of Wuxi; 2001–2003	Succeeded by Mao Xiaoping
