= Baoting Li and Miao Autonomous County =

Baoting 保亭县
- Autonomous County
- 保亭黎族苗族县; Baoting Li and Miao Autonomous County
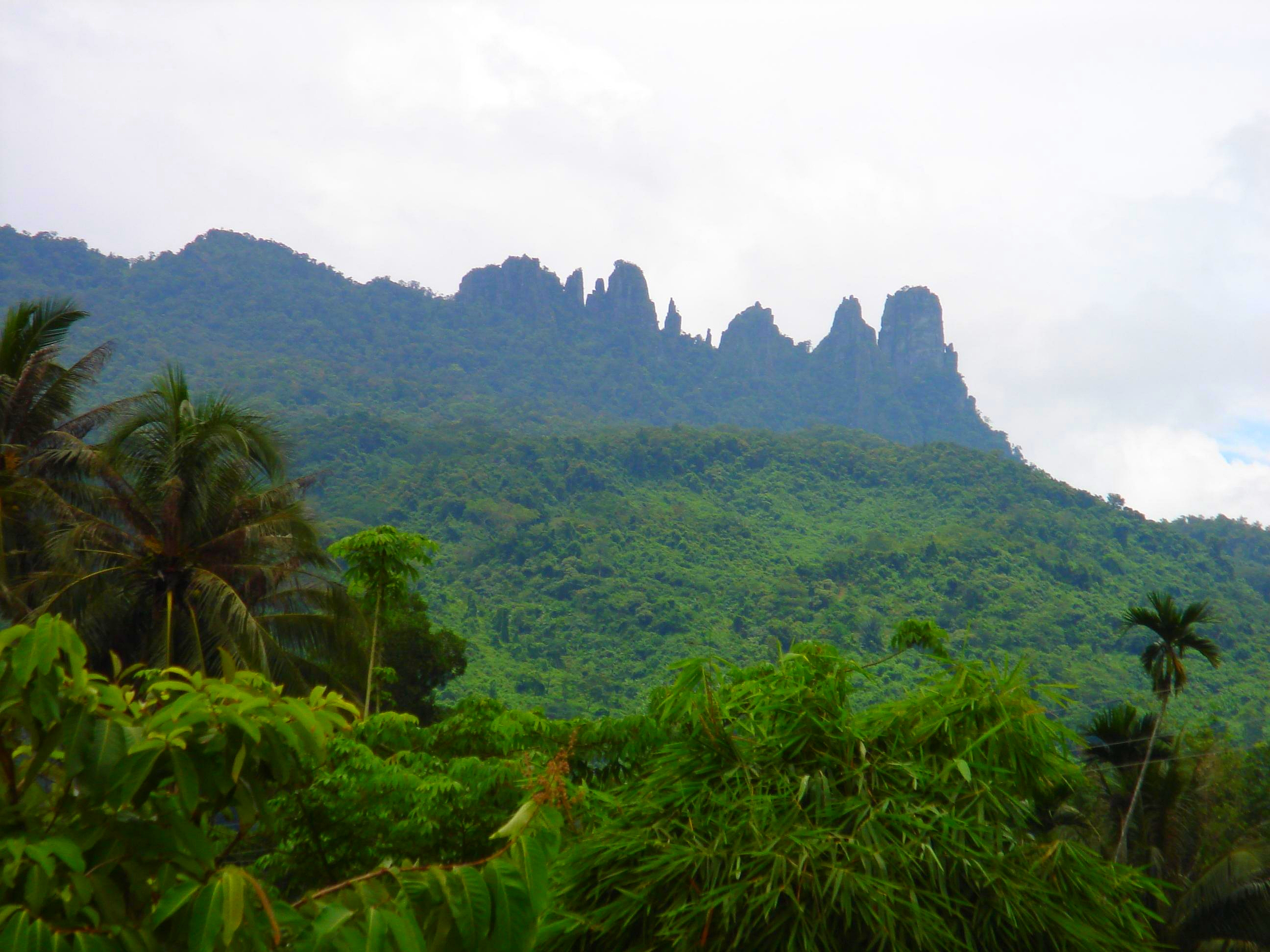

- Location in Hainan
- Coordinates: 18°38′28″N 109°46′30″E
- Country: People's Republic of China
- Province: Hainan
- Seat: Baocheng Town

Area
  - Total: 1,153.24 km^{2} (445.27 sq mi)

Population (2020)
  - Total: 168,000
  - Density: 146/km^{2} (377/sq mi)
- Time zone: UTC+8 (China standard time)

Baoting Li and Miao Autonomous County is an autonomous county in Hainan, China. One of the six autonomous counties on the island, its postal code is 572300. Baoting spans an area of 1,153.24 square kilometres (445.27 mi^{2}), and has a population of about 168,000 as of 2020.

== History ==
The area has been referred to as Baoting (Chinese: 保亭; pinyin: Bǎotíng) since at least the Ming dynasty. Baoting was first incorporated as a county in 1935.

Baoting fell under control of the People's Liberation Army in February 1948.

== Climate ==
Baoting has a tropical monsoon climate (Köppen Am). During the winter, the average high temperature exceeds 26°C (78.8°F) and the rainy season is long. Because it is blocked by Wuzhishan Mountain, cold air cannot easily invade. The climate is warm all year round. The Qixianling Forest Park within the territory has given birth to large areas of tropical mountainous region al rainforest.

Climate data for Baoting, elevation 69 m (226 ft), (1991–2020 normals, extremes 1974–2010)
Month	Jan	Feb	Mar	Apr	May	Jun	Jul	Aug	Sep	Oct	Nov	Dec	Year
Record high °C (°F)	32.6 (90.7)	34.0 (93.2)	35.4 (95.7)	38.0 (100.4)	38.9 (102.0)	37.4 (99.3)	37.2 (99.0)	37.3 (99.1)	36.5 (97.7)	35.7 (96.3)	34.3 (93.7)	32.9 (91.2)	38.9 (102.0)
Mean daily maximum °C (°F)	26.6 (79.9)	27.5 (81.5)	29.5 (85.1)	31.8 (89.2)	33.2 (91.8)	33.2 (91.8)	33.0 (91.4)	33.0 (91.4)	32.3 (90.1)	30.8 (87.4)	29.2 (84.6)	26.7 (80.1)	30.6 (87.0)
Daily mean °C (°F)	20.5 (68.9)	21.6 (70.9)	23.8 (74.8)	26.2 (79.2)	27.6 (81.7)	28.1 (82.6)	27.8 (82.0)	27.5 (81.5)	26.8 (80.2)	25.5 (77.9)	23.8 (74.8)	21.3 (70.3)	25.0 (77.1)
Mean daily minimum °C (°F)	16.6 (61.9)	17.9 (64.2)	20.3 (68.5)	22.7 (72.9)	24.3 (75.7)	24.9 (76.8)	24.7 (76.5)	24.4 (75.9)	23.8 (74.8)	22.3 (72.1)	20.4 (68.7)	17.8 (64.0)	21.7 (71.0)
Record low °C (°F)	2.2 (36.0)	7.4 (45.3)	6.3 (43.3)	16.5 (61.7)	14.7 (58.5)	18.8 (65.8)	21.2 (70.2)	21.1 (70.0)	17.0 (62.6)	11.9 (53.4)	9.8 (49.6)	4.8 (40.6)	2.2 (36.0)
Average precipitation mm (inches)	14.9 (0.59)	25.6 (1.01)	36.9 (1.45)	108.6 (4.28)	253.6 (9.98)	268.9 (10.59)	356.8 (14.05)	348.2 (13.71)	353.0 (13.90)	274.6 (10.81)	88.3 (3.48)	23.7 (0.93)	2,153.1 (84.78)
Average precipitation days (≥ 0.1 mm)	5.8	6.2	6.5	9.9	16.8	18.4	20.5	21.9	21.8	14.7	8.0	5.4	155.9
Average relative humidity (%)	78	79	80	81	83	84	85	86	86	81	77	75	81
Mean monthly sunshine hours	131.7	111.1	122.6	144.0	170.2	159.1	169.7	158.4	135.5	154.9	153.0	137.6	1,747.8
Percentage possible sunshine	38	34	33	38	42	40	42	40	37	43	46	40	39
Source: China Meteorological Administration all-time extreme low

== Administrative divisions ==
The autonomous county administers one residential community (Chinese: 社区; pinyin: shè qū), six towns (Chinese: 镇; pinyin: zhèn), and three townships (Chinese: 乡; pinyin: xiāng).

=== Residential communities ===
The autonomous county directly administers one residential community, which are typically governed by township-level divisions: Xinxing Community (Chinese: 新星社区; pinyin: Xīnxīng Shèqū).

=== Towns ===
The autonomous county administers the following six towns:

- Baocheng (Chinese: 保城镇; pinyin: Bǎochéng Zhèn)
- Shiling (Chinese: 什玲镇; pinyin: Shílíng Zhèn)
- Jiamao (Chinese: 加茂镇; pinyin: Jiāmào Zhèn)
- Xiangshui (Chinese: 响水镇; pinyin: Xiǎngshuǐ Zhèn)
- Xinzheng (Chinese: 新政镇; pinyin: Xīnzhèng Zhèn)
- Sandao (Chinese: 三道镇; pinyin: Sāndào Zhèn)

=== Townships ===
The autonomous county administers the following three townships:

- Liugong Township (Chinese: 六弓乡; pinyin: Liùgōng Xiāng)
- Nanlin Township (Chinese: 南林乡; pinyin: Nánlín Xiāng)
- Maogan Township (Chinese: 毛感乡; pinyin: Máogǎn Xiāng)

== Demographics ==
As of 2020, Baoting's population totaled about 168,000. In 1999 the county had a population of 155,575, largely made up of the indigenous Li people and Miao people.

62.4% of the autonomous county's population is ethnically Li, 30.2% is ethnically Han, 4.5% is ethnically Miao, and 2.9% belong to other ethnic groups.

== Economy ==
The autonomous county's gross domestic product totaled 5.627 billion renminbi (RMB) as of 2020. As of 2020, urban residents have an annual per capita disposable income of 33,564 RMB, a figure which totaled 14,067 RMB for rural residents; these figures grew by 3.2% and 8.8% in 2020, respectively.

Baoting has a large agricultural sector, and crops grown in the autonomous county include rambutan, mangosteen, katuk, okra, and passion fruit.

== See also ==
- List of administrative divisions of Hainan
