= Wang Shoudao =

Chinese politician (1906–1996)

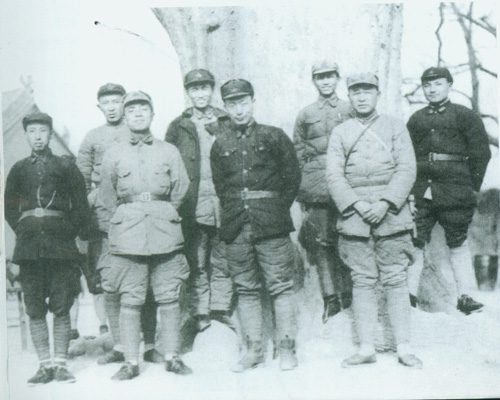
1st Red Army and 15th Red Army commanders in Chunhua County, Shaanxi, February 1936. Front row from left:Wang Shoudao, Yang Shangkun, Nie Rongzhen, Xu Haidong. Back row from left: Luo Ruiqing, Cheng Zihua, Chen Guang, Deng Xiaoping.

Wang Shoudao (Chinese: 王首道) (April 13, 1906 – September 13, 1996), original name Wang Fanglin (Chinese: 王芳林) was a People's Republic of China politician. He was born in Liuyang, Hunan Province. He joined the Chinese Communist Party in 1925. He was governor of his home province. He was minister of transport (1958–1964). He was the Chinese People's Political Consultative Conference Committee Chairman of Guangdong.

Preceded by Chen Mingren	Governor of Hunan; 1952	Succeeded by Cheng Qian
Preceded by Zhang Bojun	Minister of Transport; 1958–1964	Succeeded by Sun Daguang
Preceded by Ou Mengjue	CPPCC Committee Chairman of Guangdong	Succeeded by Yin Linping
