= Liang Weilin =

Chinese politician

Liang Weilin (Chinese: 梁威林) (1911–2008) was a People's Republic of China politician. He was born in Bobai County, Guangxi. He was CPPCC Committee Chairman of Guangdong Province. From 1957, he served as a secretary for Hongkong and Macau Work Committee inside the NCNA

Preceded by Yin Linping	CPPCC Committee Chairman of Guangdong	Succeeded by Wu Nansheng
