= Yin Linping =

Chinese politician (1908–1984)

Yin Liping (Chinese: 尹林平) (July 1908 – September 8, 1984) was a People's Republic of China politician. He was born in Xingguo County, Jiangxi Province. He joined the Chinese Workers' and Peasants' Red Army in 1930 and the Chinese Communist Party in 1931. He was CPPCC Committee Chairman of Guangdong Province.

Preceded by Wang Shoudao	CPPCC Committee Chairman of Guangdong	Succeeded by Liang Weilin
