= Huang Longyun =

Chinese politician

- 黄龙云

Personal details
- Born: November 1951 (age 74) Meixian District, Meizhou, Guangdong, People's Republic of China
- Party: Chinese Communist Party (since 1970)

Chinese name
- Traditional Chinese: 黃龍雲
- Simplified Chinese: 黄龙云
Transcriptions
Standard Mandarin
- Hanyu Pinyin: Huáng Lóngyún
Hakka
- Romanization: Vong^{2} Liung^{2}-yun^{2}
- Pha̍k-fa-sṳ: Vòng Liùng-yùn
Yue: Cantonese
- Jyutping: Wong^{4} Lung^{4}-wan^{4}

Huang Longyun (simplified Chinese: 黄龙云; traditional Chinese: 黃龍雲; pinyin: Huáng Lóngyùn; born November 1951) is a politician of the People's Republic of China, the current chairman of the Guangdong People's Congress, and the former chairman of the Chinese People's Political Consultative Conference (CPPCC) Guangdong Committee. Huang is a native of Meixian District, Meizhou, Guangdong.

Beginning in 1995, Huang served in a number of positions in Zhuhai, Guangdong, including municipal CPC Committee deputy secretary, acting mayor, and mayor. In 2000, he was elevated to the Guangdong provincial Party Standing Committee. In 2002, he was concurrently named Party Committee Secretary of Foshan. In 2007, Huang became Vice-Governor of Guangdong Province. In 2010, he was selected as the CPPCC Guangdong Committee Chairman, and on 31 January 2013 was named to as People's Congress Chairman.
