= Yuan Baocheng =

Chinese politician

Yuan Baocheng (Chinese: 袁宝成; born December 1964) is a Chinese politician and the current mayor of Dongguan. He was appointed vice mayor and acting mayor in 2011 by the Dongguan Municipal People's Congress. The same body elected him mayor in 2012.

In February 2016, Yuan was appointed a vice-governor of Guangdong where he served until January 2018. In that month, Yuan was elected a vice-chairman of the Guangdong CPPCC.

Yuan earned a master's degree from Southwest University of Political Science & Law.

Previously Yuan had been Vice Mayor of Shenzhen.
