= Party Secretary of Chongqing =

Municipal government position in China

Secretary of the Chongqing Municipal Committee of the Chinese Communist Party
- 中国共产党重庆市委员会书记
- Emblem of the Chinese Communist Party

- Flag of the Chinese Communist Party

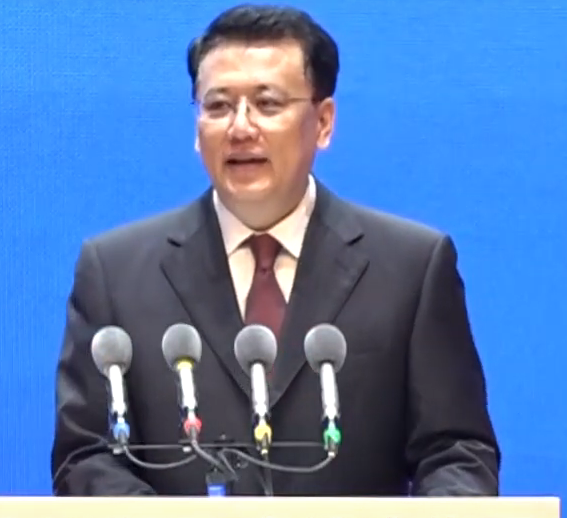
- Incumbent; Yuan Jiajun since 9 December 2022
- Chongqing Municipal Committee of the Chinese Communist Party
- Type: Party Committee Secretary
- Status: Provincial and ministerial-level official
- Member of: Chongqing Municipal Standing Committee
- Nominator: Central Committee
- Appointer: Chongqing Municipal Committee; Central Committee
- Inaugural holder: Chen Xilian
- Formation: 1949
- Deputy: Deputy Secretary; Secretary-General

The secretary of the Chongqing Municipal Committee of the Chinese Communist Party is the leader of the Chongqing Municipal Committee of the Chinese Communist Party (CCP). As the CCP is the sole ruling party of the People's Republic of China (PRC), the secretary is the highest ranking post in Chongqing.

The secretary is officially appointed by the CCP Central Committee based on the recommendation of the CCP Organization Department, which is then approved by the Politburo and its Standing Committee. The secretary can be also appointed by a plenary meeting of the Chongqing Municipal Committee, but the candidate must be the same as the one approved by the central government. The secretary leads the Standing Committee of the Chongqing Municipal Committee, and since at least 2007, the secretary has consistently been a member of the CCP Politburo. The secretary leads the work of the Municipal Committee and its Standing Committee. The secretary is outranks the mayor, who is generally the deputy secretary of the committee.

The current secretary is Yuan Jiajun, a member of the CCP Politburo, who took office on 9 December 2022.

== List of party secretaries ==
| No. | Image | Name | Term start | Term end | Ref. |
|---|---|---|---|---|---|
| 1 | | Chen Xilian (陈锡联) (1915–1999) | 1949 | 1950 | |
| 2 | | Zhang Linzhi (张霖之) (1908–1967) | 1950 | 1952 | |
| 3 | | Cao Diqiu (曹荻秋) (1909–1976) | 1952 | 1954 | |
| 4 | | Yan Hongyan (阎红彦) (1909–1967) | 1956 | 1959 | |
| 5 | | Ren Baige (任白戈) (1906–1986) | 1959 | 1967 | |
| 6 | | Lan Yinong (蓝亦农) (1919–2008) | 1967 | 1968 | |
| 7 | | Duan Siying (段思英) (1917–2007) | 1968 | 1969 | |
| 8 | | He Yunfeng (何云峰) (1922–2013) | 1969 | 1973 | |
| 9 | | Lu Dadong (鲁大东) (1915–1998) | 1973 | 1977 | |
| 10 | | Qian Min (钱敏) (1915–2016) | 1977 | 1978 | |
| 11 | | Ding Changhe (丁长河) (born 1934) | 1978 | 1980 | |
| 12 | | Yu Hanqing (于汉卿) (1929–2011) | 1980 | 1985 | |
| 13 | | Liao Bokang (廖伯康) (born 1924) | 1985 | 1988 | |
| 14 | | Xiao Yang (肖秧) (1929–1998) | 1988 | 1993 | |
| 15 | | Sun Tongchuan (孙同川) (born 1940) | 1993 | 1995 | |
| 16 | | Zhang Delin (张德邻) (born 1939) | October 1995 | June 1999 | |
| 17 | | He Guoqiang (贺国强) (born 1943) | June 1999 | October 2002 | |
| 18 | | Huang Zhendong (黄镇东) (born 1941) | October 2002 | December 2005 | |
| 19 | | Wang Yang (汪洋) (born 1955) | 24 December 2005 | 30 November 2007 | |
| 20 | | Bo Xilai (薄熙来) (born 1949) | 30 November 2007 | 15 March 2012 | |
| 21 | | Zhang Dejiang (张德江) (born 1946) | 15 March 2012 | 20 November 2012 | |
| 22 | | Sun Zhengcai (孙政才) (born 1963) | 20 November 2012 | 14 July 2017 | |
| 23 | | Chen Min'er (陈敏尔) (born 1960) | 15 July 2017 | 8 December 2022 | |
| 24 | | Yuan Jiajun (袁家军) (born 1962) | 8 December 2022 | Incumbent | |
