= Politics of Chongqing =

The politics of Chongqing is structured in a dual party-government system like all other governing institutions in the People's Republic of China (PRC).

The mayor of Chongqing is the highest-ranking official in the People's Government of Chongqing. As since 1997 Chongqing has been a centrally administered municipality, the mayor occupies the same level in the order of precedence as provincial governors. However, in the city's dual party-government governing system, the mayor has less power than the Chongqing Chinese Communist Party Municipal Committee Secretary, colloquially termed the "Chongqing CCP Party Chief".

Since 1997, the Chongqing Municipal People's Congress has governed Chongqing. Chongqing was previously also governed by a municipal government between 1939 and 1954, but in 1929–1939 and 1954–1997, when Chongqing was a sub-provincial city rather than a centrally administered municipality, it was governed by the Chongqing City Government.

== Chongqing model ==
Politics of Chongqing
- Location of Chongqing
- Simplified Chinese: 重庆模式
- Traditional Chinese: 重慶模式
Transcriptions
Standard Mandarin
- Hanyu Pinyin: Chóngqìng móshì

The "Chongqing model" was a series of social and economic policies adopted in the Chinese megalopolis of Chongqing. It is most closely associated with Bo Xilai, who served as the city's Communist Party secretary from 2007 to 2012, though some policies were put in place by Bo's predecessors.

The Chongqing model was characterized in part by increased state control and the promotion of a neo-leftist ideology. It involved a sweeping and sometimes extrajudicial campaign against organized crime, and increased the security and police presence in the city. As a means of addressing declining public morality, Bo launched a "red culture" movement to promote Maoist-era socialist ethics. On the economic front, he actively courted foreign investment and focused on manufacturing for domestic consumption. The Chongqing model was also characterized by massive public works programs, subsidized housing for the poor, and social policies intended to make it easier for rural citizens to move to the city.

The Chongqing model represented an alternative model of development which diverged from the policies favored by the reformist faction led by Party general secretary Hu Jintao and Premier Wen Jiabao, as well as the model put by the Guangdong CCP committee secretary Wang Yang. When Bo Xilai was removed from his posts in the spring of 2012, authorities began a campaign to reverse several of the policies that characterized the Chongqing model, including by cracking down on expressions of "red culture". Individuals, who believed they had been wrongly persecuted under the anti-corruption campaign, also began seeking legal redress.

== List of the CCP Chongqing committee secretaries ==
No.	Image	Name	Term start	Term end	Ref.
1		Chen Xilian (陈锡联) (1915–1999)	1949	1950	
2		Zhang Linzhi (张霖之) (1908–1967)	1950	1952	
3		Cao Diqiu (曹荻秋) (1909–1976)	1952	1954	
4		Yan Hongyan (阎红彦) (1909–1967)	1956	1959	
5		Ren Baige (任白戈) (1906–1986)	1959	1967	
6		Lan Yinong (蓝亦农) (1919–2008)	1967	1968	
7		Duan Siying (段思英) (1917–2007)	1968	1969	
8		He Yunfeng (何云峰) (1922–2013)	1969	1973	
9		Lu Dadong (鲁大东) (1915–1998)	1973	1977	
10		Qian Min (钱敏) (1915–2016)	1977	1978	
11		Ding Changhe (丁长河) (born 1934)	1978	1980	
12		Yu Hanqing (于汉卿) (1929–2011)	1980	1985	
13		Liao Bokang (廖伯康) (born 1924)	1985	1988	
14		Xiao Yang (肖秧) (1929–1998)	1988	1993	
15		Sun Tongchuan (孙同川) (born 1940)	1993	1995	
16		Zhang Delin (张德邻) (born 1939)	October 1995	June 1999	
17		He Guoqiang (贺国强) (born 1943)	June 1999	October 2002	
18		Huang Zhendong (黄镇东) (born 1941)	October 2002	December 2005	
19		Wang Yang (汪洋) (born 1955)	24 December 2005	30 November 2007	
20		Bo Xilai (薄熙来) (born 1949)	30 November 2007	15 March 2012	
21		Zhang Dejiang (张德江) (born 1946)	15 March 2012	20 November 2012	
22		Sun Zhengcai (孙政才) (born 1963)	20 November 2012	14 July 2017	
23		Chen Min'er (陈敏尔) (born 1960)	15 July 2017	8 December 2022	
24		Yuan Jiajun (袁家军) (born 1962)	8 December 2022	Incumbent	

== List of mayors of Chongqing ==
No.	Officeholder	Term of office		Political party	Ref.
No.	Officeholder	Took office	Left office	Political party	Ref.
Director of the People's Liberation Army Military Control Commission of Chongqing Municipality
1	Zhang Jichun (1900–1968)	3 December 1949	?	Chinese Communist Party	
Mayor of the Chongqing Municipal People's Government
1	Chen Xilian (1915–1995)	2 December 1949	September 1950	Chinese Communist Party	
2	Cao Diqiu (1909–1976)	December 1951	19 June 1954	Chinese Communist Party	
Mayor of the Chongqing Municipal People's Government (province-level city of Sichuan)
(2)	Cao Diqiu (1909–1976)	19 June 1954	January 1955	Chinese Communist Party	
3	Ren Baige (1906–1986)	January 1955	July 1966	Chinese Communist Party	
Director of the Chongqing Revolutionary Committee
4	Lan Yinong (1919–2008)	May 1968	December 1968	Chinese Communist Party	
5	Duan Siying (1917–2007)	December 1968	1969	Chinese Communist Party	
6	He Yunfeng (1922–2013)	1969	December 1973	Chinese Communist Party	
7	Lu Dadong (1915–1998)	December 1973	1978	Chinese Communist Party	
8	Qian Min (1915–2016)	May 1978	August 1978	Chinese Communist Party	
9	Ding Changhe (born 1934)	1978	March 1980	Chinese Communist Party	
Mayor of the Chongqing Municipal People's Government (province-level city of Sichuan)
10	Yu Hanqing (1929–2011)	March 1980	May 1985	Chinese Communist Party	
11	Xiao Yang (1929–1998)	May 1985	August 1988	Chinese Communist Party	
12	Sun Tongchuan (born 1940)	August 1988	April 1993	Chinese Communist Party	
13	Liu Zhizhong (born 1942)	May 1993	September 1996	Chinese Communist Party	
–	Pu Haiqing (born 1941)	September 1996	June 1999	Chinese Communist Party	
Mayor of the Chongqing Municipal People's Government
14	Pu Haiqing (born 1941)	19 June 1997	June 1999	Chinese Communist Party	
15	Bao Xuding (born 1939)	June 1999	October 2002	Chinese Communist Party	
16	Wang Hongju (born 1945)	January 2003 (acting from October 2002)	November 2009	Chinese Communist Party	
17	Huang Qifan (born 1952)	30 November 2009	30 December 2016	Chinese Communist Party	
18	Zhang Guoqing (born 1964)	30 December 2016	2 January 2018	Chinese Communist Party	
19	Tang Liangzhi (born 1960)	2 January 2018	30 December 2021	Chinese Communist Party	
20	Hu Henghua (born 1963)	30 December 2021	Incumbent	Chinese Communist Party	

== List of chairmen of Chongqing People's Congress ==
1. Wang Yunlong (王云龙): 1997–2002
2. Huang Zhendong (黄镇东): 2003–2005
3. Wang Yang (汪洋): 2006–2008
4. Chen Guangguo (陈光国): 2008–2011
5. Chen Cungen (陈存根): 2011–2012
6. Zhang Xuan (张轩): 2012–present

== List of chairmen of CPPCC Chongqing Committee ==
1. Zhang Wenbin (张文彬): 1997–2003
2. Liu Zhizhong (刘志忠): 2003–2008
3. Xing Yuanmin (邢元敏): 2008–2013
4. Xu Jingye (徐敬业): 2013–2017
5. Xu Songnan (徐松南): 2017–2018
6. Wang Jiong (王炯): 2018–2023
7. Tang Fangyu (唐方裕): 2023–present

== List of chairmen of Chongqing Supervisory Commission ==
1. Chen Yong (陈雍): January 2018–October 2018
2. Mu Hongyu (穆红玉): January 2019–December 2021
3. Song Yijia (宋依佳): March 2022–present

== See also ==
- Economy of Chongqing
