= Sichuan Provincial Committee of the Chinese People's Political Consultative Conference =

Sichuan Provincial Committee of the Chinese People's Political Consultative Conference 中国人民政治协商会议四川省委员会
- 13th
- Emblem of the Chinese People's Political Consultative Conference

Type
- Type: United front organ Constitutional convention (Historical); Legislature (Historical) of Chinese People's Political Consultative Conference

History
- Founded: January 1955; 71 years ago
- Preceded by: Sichuan Provincial People's Congress Consultative Committee

Leadership
- Chairperson: Tian Xiangli

Website
- www.sczx.gov.cn

Chinese name
- Simplified Chinese: 中国人民政治协商会议四川省委员会
- Traditional Chinese: 中國人民政治協商會議四川省委員會
Transcriptions
Standard Mandarin
- Hanyu Pinyin: Zhōngguó Rénmín Zhèngzhì Xiéshāng Huìyì Sìchuānshěng Wěiyuánhuì

Abbreviation
- Simplified Chinese: 四川省政协
- Traditional Chinese: 四川省政協
- Literal meaning: CPPCC Sichuan Provincial Committee
Transcriptions
Standard Mandarin
- Hanyu Pinyin: Sìchuānshěng Zhèngxié

The Sichuan Provincial Committee of the Chinese People's Political Consultative Conference (Chinese: 中国人民政治协商会议四川省委员会) is the advisory body and a local organization of the Chinese People's Political Consultative Conference in Sichuan, China. it is supervised and directed by the Sichuan Provincial Committee of the Chinese Communist Party.

== History ==
The Sichuan Provincial Committee of the Chinese People's Political Consultative Conference traces its origins to the Sichuan Provincial People's Congress Consultative Committee (四川省各界人民代表会议协商委员会), founded in January 1955.

== Term ==
=== 1st ===
- Term: January 1955–July 1959
- Chairperson: Li Jingquan
- Vice Chairpersons: Liu Wenhui, Zhao Lin, Zhang Shushi, Li Xiaoting, Dan Maoxin, Cheng Zijian, Hu Ziang, Xu Xiaogang, Pan Dakui, Liao Zhigao (March 1956–), Jiangyang Bome (March 1956–), Xiake Daodeng (March 1956–), Guoji Mugu (March 1956–), Xu Chonglin (April 1957–), Peng Shaonong (April 1957–)

=== 2nd ===
- Term: July 1959–September 1963
- Chairperson: Li Jingquan
- Vice Chairpersons: Liao Zhigao, Dan Maoxin, Cheng Zijian, Zhang Shushi, Li Xiaoting, Xu Chonglin, Peng Shaonong, Guoji Mugu, Xiake Daodeng, Gong Fengchun, Yu Jitang, Peng Dixian, Tian Yiping, Hua'er Gongchenlie

=== 3rd ===
- Term: September 1963–December 1977
- Chairperson: Li Jingquan → Liao Zhigao (December 1965–)
- Vice Chairpersons: Liao Zhigao, Du Xinyuan, Dan Maoxin, Cheng Zijian, Zhang Shushi, Peng Dixian, Xu Chonglin, Peng Shaonong, Awang Jiacuo, Guoji Mugu, Yu Jitang, Tian Yiping, Hua'er Gongchenlie, Liu Xingyuan, Li Zonglin (December 1965–), Gu Zhibiao (December 1965–), Luo Chenglie (December 1965–)

=== 4th ===
- Term: December 1977–April 1983
- Chairperson: Du Xinyuan → Ren Baige
- Vice Chairpersons: Yang Chao, Zhang Xiushu, Tong Shaosheng, Gu Zhibiao, Zhang Huchen, Peng Dixian, Shi Chu, Wang Dingyi, Ren Jinglong, Luo Chenglie, Xu Chonglin, Guoji Mugu, Zhao Mengming, Qiao Zhongling, Tian Yiping, Liu Xingyuan, Jiangyang Bome, Bai Ren (May 1979–), Zhao Yuqiao (May 1979–), Wang Tengbo (May 1979–), Liu Yunbo (May 1979–), Liu Piyun (May 1979–), Zhou Qinyue (May 1979–), Li Zhen (May 1979–), Ke Zhao (May 1979–), Cao Zhongliang (December 1979–), Liu Wenzhen (December 1979–), Luo Zhimin (December 1979–), Luo Shiyu (March 1982–), Pan Dakui (March 1982–)

=== 5th ===
- Term: April 1983–February 1988
- Chairperson: Yang Chao → Feng Yuanwei (May 1985–)
- Vice Chairpersons: Zhou Yi, Yu Hongyuan, Zhou Qinyue, Pan Dakui, Wang Dingyi, Luo Chenglie, Xu Chonglin, Ren Jinglong, Li Zhen, Luo Shiyu, Ke Zhao, Tian Yiping, Li Peigen, Guoji Mugu, Jiangyang Bome, Deng Zili, Wang Lizhi (June 1984–), Yang Daidi (June 1984–), Huang Qizao (May 1985–), Li Weijia (May 1985–), Feng Dashi (May 1985–), Zhang Guangqin (May 1985–), Yang Lingduoji (May 1986–)

=== 6th ===
- Term: February 1988–February 1993
- Chairperson: Liao Bokang
- Vice Chairpersons: Wang Yu, Wang Shuyun, Wang Lizhi, Feng Dashi, Liu Chunfu, Xin Wen, Li Peigen, Yang Daidi, Yang Lingduoji, Wu Hanjia, Chen Zuxiang, Ke Zhao, Jiang Zeting, Jiangyang Bome, Li Keguang (February 1990–), Kongsa Yiduo (?–)

=== 7th ===
- Term: February 1993–January 1998
- Chairperson: Nie Ronggui
- Vice Chairpersons: Yang Lingduoji, Liu Yuanxuan, Liu Changjie, Chen Zuxiang, Li Keguang, Yang Daidi, Kongsa Yiduo, Liu Shibai, Zhang Tinghan, Zeng Pingjiang, Han Bangyan (–January 1996), Wang Yu (–January 1996), Xin Wen (–January 1996), Liu Shaoxian (February 1995–), Luo Yuanjun (February 1995–), Hao Zhenxian (January 1996–), Zhang Yujun (January 1996–)

=== 8th ===
- Term: January 1998–January 2003
- Chairperson: Qin Yuqin → Liu Shaoxian
- Vice Chairpersons: Zeng Pingjiang, Sun Tongchuan, Shi Zhiyi, Hao Zhenxian, Zhang Yujun, A Cheng, Yang Guanghua, Chen Guanquan, Wu Zhengde, Chen Changzhi, Gou Jianli, Tang Yunzhang

=== 9th ===
- Term: January 2003–January 2008
- Chairperson: Qin Yuqin
- Vice Chairpersons: Sun Tongchuan, Feng Chongtai, Liu Shaoxian, Li Jin, Wang Hengfeng, Chen Guanquan, Wu Zhengde, A Cheng, Gou Jianli, He Zhiyao, Chen Jie, Xiao Guangcheng, Liu Yingming, Chen Cichang

=== 10th ===
- Term: January 2008–January 2013
- Chairperson: Tao Wuxian
- Vice Chairpersons: Yan Yonghe, Chen Guangzhi, Wu Zhengde, Chen Jie, Chen Cichang, Xie Hong, Zeng Qinghua, Zhang Yudong, Huang Runqiu
- Secretary-General: Wu Guohang

=== 11th ===
- Term: January 2013–January 2018
- Chairperson: Li Chongxi (removed) → Ke Zunping
- Vice Chairpersons: Yan Yonghe, Zhang Yudong, Huang Runqiu, Gao Feng, Zhai Zhanyi, Yang Xingping, Wang Zhengrong, Zhao Zhenxian, Cui Baohua (January 2017–), Liu Jie (January 2017–), Deng Chuan (January 2017–)
- Secretary-General: Gao Feng

=== 12th ===
- Term: January 2018–January 2023
- Chairperson: Ke Zunping (–January 2022) → Tian Xiangli (January 2022–)
- Vice Chairpersons: Cui Baohua (–January 2022), Zhong Mian, Zhang Yudong (–September 2021), Wang Zhengrong (–January 2021), Zhao Zhenxian, Chen Fang (–September 2021), Lin Shucheng, Ouyang Zehua, Zhu Chunxiu, Li Changping (January 2019–), Du Heping (May 2020–), Liu Chengming (May 2020–), Qumu Shiha (February 2021–), Yang Kening (February 2021–), Gan Lin (January 2022–June 2022), Yao Sidan (January 2022–), Yang Dan (January 2022–)
- Secretary-General: Wang Jianjun (–February 2021) → Lan Kaichi (February 2021–)

=== 13th ===
- Term: January 2023–2028
- Chairperson: Tian Xiangli
- Vice Chairpersons: Zhong Mian, Du Heping, Yao Sidan (–January 2025), Lin Shucheng, Ouyang Zehua, Liu Chengming, Yang Dan, Xie Shanghua, Liu Xuguang, Xu Weilin
- Secretary-General: Li Jianqin (–January 2025) → Ma Bo (January 2025–)
