= Politics of Chengdu =

In Sichuan province, China

The Politics of Chengdu in Sichuan province, China is structured in a dual party-government system like all other governing institutions in mainland China. Chengdu Municipal Government is deeply influenced by its long past. Chengdu's political system reflects the two major influences on the historical development of China: on the one hand, its legacy as an over 2,000 years feudal system region, and on the other, the powerful influence exerted by China's neighbor to the north, the Soviet Union.

The Mayor is the highest-ranking official in Chengdu Municipal Government, which officially called Chengdu Municipal People's Government. However, in the city's dual party-government governing system, the Mayor has less power than the Chinese Communist Party Committee Secretary of Chengdu, colloquially termed the "Communist Party Secretary of Chengdu" or "Party Secretary of Chengdu".

== Introduction ==
As a city of the Communist State, Chengdu's system of government was based on the Soviet Union system of one party dictatorship. This is referred to as "Soviet Union-style" democracy.

The Head of the Chengdu Municipal Government is the Mayor. The Mayor's agreement is required for an Act of Chengdu People's Congress to become law. The People's Congress has a number of different functions, first and foremost, it scrutinize the execution of constitution, laws, regulations in the city. Another important function is to debate the major issues of the city. Its other roles are to provide the means of carrying on the work of government by voting for leaders, including chairmen and vice-chairman of the People's Congress, mayor, deputy mayor, president of the municipal court and president of the municipal procuratorate.

== History ==
On December 5, 2012, state media announced that Li Chuncheng was being investigated by the Central Commission for Discipline Inspection (CCDI) for "serious violations of laws and regulations". He was sentenced to 13 years in prison on October 12, 2015.

== List of mayors ==
Name (English)	Name (Chinese)	Tenure begins	Tenure ends	Note
Zhou Shidi	周世第	January 1950	July 1950	
Li Zonglin	李宗林	July 1950	February 1966	
Mi Jianshu	米建书	February 1966	May 1968	
Sun Hongdao	孙洪道	May 1968	August 1974	
Xu Mengxia	许梦侠	August 1974	January 1979	
Mi Jianshu	米建书	January 1979	March 1982	
Hu Maozhou	胡懋洲	March 1982	May 1988	
Diao Jinxiang	刁金祥	November 1988	March 1992	
Huang Yinkui	黄寅逵	March 1992	October 1993	
Wang Rongxuan	王荣轩	October 1993	January 2001	
Li Chuncheng	李春城	January 2001	June 2003	
Ge Honglin	葛红林	June 2003	October 2014	
Tang Liangzhi	唐良智	January 2015	September 2016	
Luo Qiang	罗强	January 2017	July 2020	
Wang Fengzhao	王凤朝	July 2020		

== List of CCP Committee Secretaries ==
=== Republic of China ===
Name (English)	Name (Chinese)	Tenure begins	Tenure ends	Note
Zhang Xiushu	张秀熟	October 1927	January 1928	
Liu Rongjian	刘荣简	January 1928	March 1932	Party Secretary of Chengdu County
Ma Jialong	马加龙	March 1932	March 1938	Party Secretary of Chenghua District
Du Fusheng	杜桴生	March 1938	May 1938	
Han Tianshi	韩天石	May 1938	July 1938	
Zhang Xuan	张宣	July 1938	October 1938	
Zhang Wencheng	张文澄	October 1938	June 1940	
Hou Fangyue	侯方岳	June 1940	March 1941	
Wei Zetong	魏泽同	March 1941	September 1941	
Li Dechun	李德椿	September 1941	March 1942	
Wang Zhizhong	王致中	March 1942	May 1946	
Pu Huafu	蒲华辅	May 1946		
Peng Sai	彭塞	Autumn of 1947	February 1948	
Hong Deming	洪德铭	February 1948	1950	

=== People's Republic of China ===
Name (English)	Name (Chinese)	Tenure begins	Tenure ends	Note
Li Jingquan	李井泉	12 April 1950	14 January 1953	
Hao Deqing	郝德青	14 January 1953	30 December 1954	
Liao Jingdan	廖井丹	30 December 1954	29 May 1956	
Liao Jingdan	廖井丹	29 May 1956	January 1969	First Party Secretary of Chengdu
Sun Hongdao	孙洪道	January 1969	April 1971	
Sun Hongdao	孙洪道	April 1971	August 1974	
Xu Mengxia	许梦侠	August 1974	December 1979	
Mi Jianshu	米建书	December 1979	March 1981	
Mi Jianshu	米建书	March 1981	May 1983	
Wu Xihai	吴希海	May 1983	May 1993	
Huang Yinkui	黄寅逵	May 1993	December 1997	
Tao Wuxian	陶武先	December 1997	December 2000	
Wang Rongxuan	王荣轩	January 2001	June 2003	
Li Chuncheng	李春城	June 2003	November 2011	
Huang Xinchu	黄新初	October 2011	July 2016	
Tang Liangzhi	唐良智	July 2016	March 2017	
Fan Ruiping	范锐平	April 2017	August 2021	
Shi Xiaolin	施小琳	August 2021		
