= Tang Liangzhi =

Chinese politician (born 1960)

- 唐良智

Chairperson of the Anhui Provincial Committee of the Chinese People's Political Consultative Conference
- In office January 2022 – February 2026
- Preceded by: Zhang Chang'er
- Succeeded by: Zhang Ximing

Mayor of Chongqing
- In office January 2, 2018 – December 30, 2021
- Party Secretary: Chen Min'er
- Preceded by: Zhang Guoqing
- Succeeded by: Hu Henghua

Party Secretary of Chengdu
- In office July 2016 – April 2017
- Preceded by: Huang Xinchu
- Succeeded by: Fan Ruiping

Mayor of Chengdu
- In office December 2014 – September 2016
- Preceded by: Ge Honglin
- Succeeded by: Luo Qiang

Mayor of Wuhan
- In office January 2011 – December 2014
- Preceded by: Ruan Chengfa
- Succeeded by: Wan Yong

Personal details
- Born: 12 June 1960 (age 66) Honghu County, Hubei, China
- Party: Chinese Communist Party
- Education: Huazhong Technology University

Tang Liangzhi (Chinese: 唐良智; pinyin: Táng Liángzhì; born 12 June 1960) is a Chinese politician. He was previously served as the chairperson of the Anhui Provincial Committee of the Chinese People's Political Consultative Conference from January 2022 to February 2026, the mayor of Chongqing from January 2018 to December 2021, party secretary of Chengdu, the capital of Sichuan Province, and mayor of Wuhan, the capital of Hubei.

== Biography ==
Tang was born in Honghu, Hubei Province. He attended the Huazhong Technology University, where he specialized in solid-state electronics. After graduating in 1983, he was sent to work for a research institute under the Ministry of Post and Telecommunications. In 1985, he returned to Wuhan to become a technician at a local research institute. In 1987, he joined the inaugural staff of the East Lake Development Area in Wuhan. He spent much of the next two decades working in the Wuhan high-tech sector, in charge of innovation and administration. In 2002, he obtained a doctorate in economics, specializing in western economics.

In June 2007, Tang moved into politics, becoming the mayor of Xiangfan. In February 2008, he was named party chief of Xiangfan. In February 2011, he was named mayor of Wuhan. His advocacy for major construction development during his time as mayor of Wuhan earned him the nickname "Mr. Dig Dig."

In December 2014, Tang left his home province and was named mayor of Chengdu. In July 2016, Tang took over the post of Chengdu party chief from Huang Xinchu.

In April 2017, Tang was named deputy party secretary of Chongqing. He was appointed as mayor of Chongqing in January 2018.

In December 2021, he was appointed party branch secretary of the Anhui Provincial Committee of the Chinese People's Political Consultative Conference, and elected the chairperson in January 2022. He was resigned the post in February 2026 due to reaching the retiring age.

Government offices
Preceded by Li Debing	Mayor of Xiangfan; 2007–2008	Succeeded by Li Xinhua
Preceded by Ruan Chengfa	Mayor of Wuhan; 2011–2014	Succeeded by Wan Yong
Preceded by Ge Honglin	Mayor of Chengdu; 2014–2016	Succeeded by Luo Qiang
Preceded by Zhang Guoqing	Mayor of Chongqing; 2018–2021	Succeeded by Hu Henghua
Party political offices
Preceded by Tian Bingzhong	Party Secretary of Xiangfan; 2008–2010	Succeeded by Li Xinhua
Preceded by Huang Xinchu	Party Secretary of Chengdu; 2016–2017	Succeeded by Fan Ruiping
Preceded by Zhang Guoqing	Deputy Party Secretary of Chongqing; 2017–2018	Succeeded by Ren Xuefeng
Assembly seats
Preceded by Zhang Chang'er	Chairperson of the Anhui Provincial Committee of the Chinese People's Political Consultative Conference; 2022–2026	Succeeded by Zhang Ximing
