= Cui Baohua =

Chinese politician

- 崔保华

vice chairman of the Sichuan Provincial Committee of the Chinese People's Political Consultative Conference
- In office January 2013 – January 2022 Serving with Yang Kening
- Chairman: Li Chongxi; Ke Zunping

Head of the United Front Work Department of the Sichuan Provincial Committee of the Chinese Communist Party
- In office September 2012 – May 2017
- Preceded by: Chen Guangzhi
- Succeeded by: Li Jing

Communist Party Secretary of Suining
- In office June 2006 – September 2012
- Deputy: He Huazhang (mayor)
- Preceded by: Yuan Benpu
- Succeeded by: Yang Hongbo

Personal details
- Born: November 1958 (age 67) Juye County, Shandong, China
- Party: Chinese Communist Party (1978–2025; expelled)
- Education: PLA Xi'an Political College; Southwest Jiaotong University

Military service
- Allegiance: People's Republic of China
- Branch/service: People's Liberation Army Ground Force
- Years of service: 1976–1992
- Rank: Soldier

Chinese name
- Simplified Chinese: 崔保华
- Traditional Chinese: 崔保華
Transcriptions
Standard Mandarin
- Hanyu Pinyin: Cuī Bǎohuá

Cui Baohua (Chinese: 崔保华; born November 1958) is a retired Chinese politician who served as vice chairman of the Sichuan Provincial Committee of the Chinese People's Political Consultative Conference from 2013 to 2022. As of August 2024 he was under investigation by China's top anti-graft watchdog. He was a member of the 12th National Committee of the Chinese People's Political Consultative Conference. He was a representative of the 17th and 18th National Congress of the Chinese Communist Party.

== Early life and education ==
Cui was born in Juye County, Shandong, in November 1958. In 2008, he earned his master's degree in administration from Southwest Jiaotong University.

== Career ==
Cui enlisted in the People's Liberation Army (PLA) in December 1976, and graduated from the PLA Xi'an Political College during service. He joined the Chinese Communist Party (CCP) in July 1978.

After retiring from the military in November 1992, Cui was assigned to the General Office of the Ministry of Personnel, where he was eventually promoted to deputy director in December 1999.

In September 2003, Cui was transferred to southwest China' Sichuan province and appointed deputy secretary-general of the CCP Sichuan Provincial Committee and director of the Standing Committee Office of the Provincial Committee. A month later, he was named acting mayor of Meishan, confirmed in February 2004. He was party secretary of Suining in June 2006, in addition to serving as chairman of the People's Congress. He became head of the United Front Work Department of the CCP Sichuan Provincial Committee in September 2012. He took up the post of vice chairman of the Sichuan Provincial Committee of the Chinese People's Political Consultative Conference which he held only from January 2013 to January 2022, although he remained head of the United Front Work Department until May 2017.

== Downfall ==
On 27 August 2024, Cui was put under investigation for alleged "serious violations of discipline and laws" by the Central Commission for Discipline Inspection (CCDI), the party's internal disciplinary body, and the National Supervisory Commission, the highest anti-corruption agency of China. His colleague Yang Kening was disgraced for graft in November 2023.

On 2 March 2025, Cui was expelled from the CCP. On April 3, he was arrested by the Supreme People's Procuratorate for suspected bribe taking. On July 25, he was indicted on suspicion of accepting bribes. On December 17, he was sentenced to 14 years and fined 5 million yuan for taking bribes worth over 65.39 million yuan (about 9.2 million U.S. dollars).

Government offices
Preceded by Yu Bin	Mayor of Meishan; 2004–2006	Succeeded by Li Jing
Party political offices
Preceded by Yuan Benpu	Communist Party Secretary of Suining; 2006–2012	Succeeded by Yang Hongbo
Preceded by Chen Guangzhi	Head of the United Front Work Department of the Sichuan Provincial Committee of the Chinese Communist Party; 2012–2017	Succeeded by Li Jing
