= Sichuan Provincial People's Government =

Government of Sichuan

Sichuan Provincial People's Government 四川省人民政府
- Established: December 1949; 76 years ago

Leadership
- Governor: Shi Xiaolin; 4 July 2024
- Parent body: Central People's Government; Sichuan Provincial People's Congress
- Elected by: Sichuan Provincial People's Congress

Meeting place
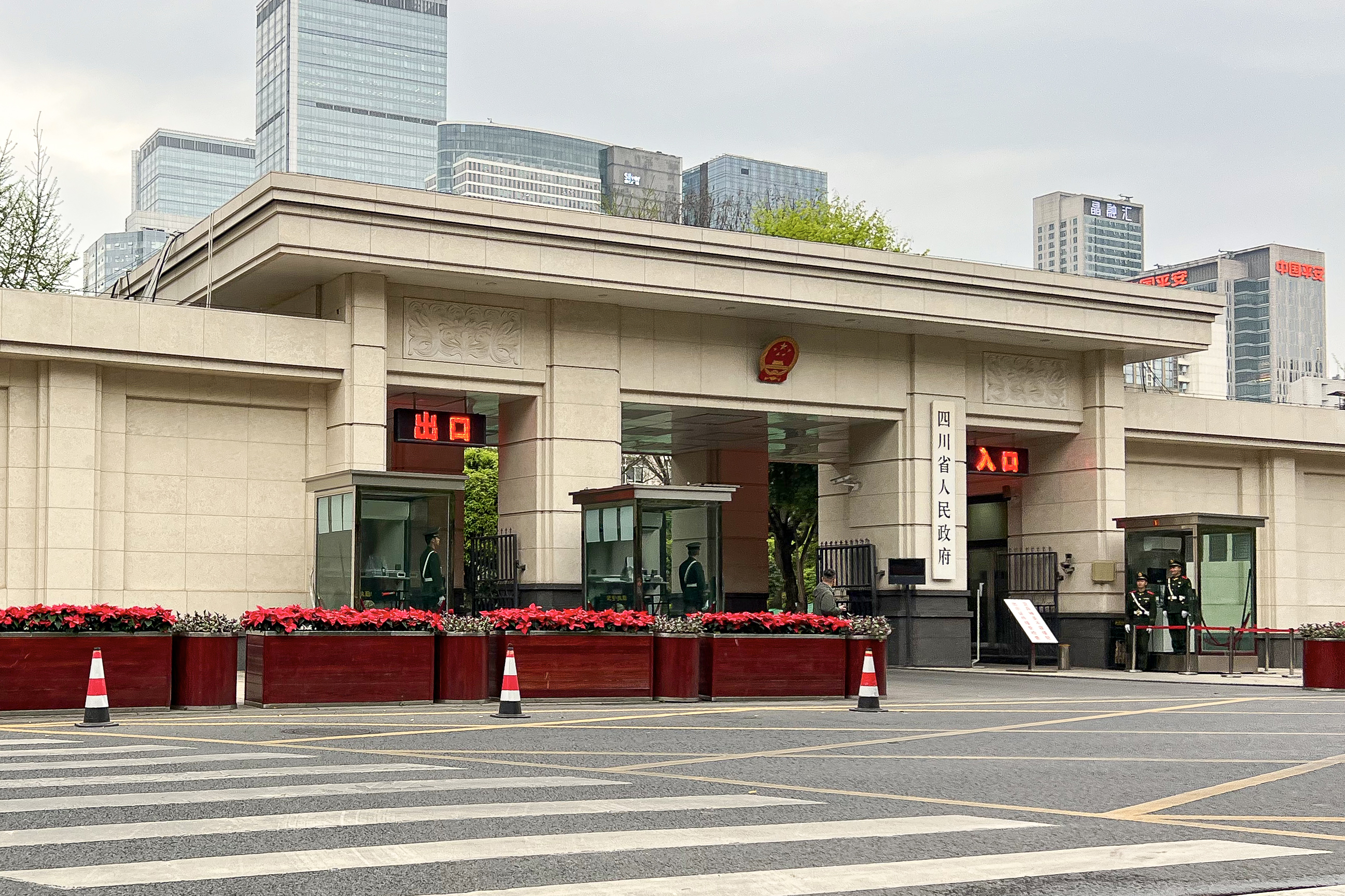
- Headquarters

Website
- www.sc.gov.cn

The Sichuan Provincial People's Government is the local administrative agency of Sichuan. It is officially elected by the Sichuan Provincial People's Congress and is formally responsible to the Sichuan Provincial People's Congress and its Standing Committee. Under the country's one-party system, the governor is subordinate to the secretary of the Sichuan Provincial Committee of the Chinese Communist Party. The Provincial government is headed by a governor, currently Shi Xiaolin.

== History ==
In December 1949, the Southwest Campaign ended and the Chinese Communist Party seized the entire Sichuan Province. From January 1950, the administrative offices of East Sichuan, South Sichuan, West Sichuan and North Sichuan were established in Sichuan. On August 7, 1952, the 17th meeting of the Central People's Government Committee decided to abolish the above four administrative offices and merge them to form the Sichuan Provincial People's Government. In January 1955, it was renamed the Sichuan Provincial People's Committee. In July of the same year, Xikang Province was incorporated. In 1967, power was seized. In May 1968, the Sichuan Provincial Revolutionary Committee was established. In December 1979, the Sichuan Provincial Revolutionary Committee was abolished and the Sichuan Provincial People's Government was re-established.

== Organization ==
The organization of the Sichuan Provincial People's Government includes:

- General Office of the Sichuan Provincial People's Government

=== Component Departments ===
- Sichuan Provincial Development and Reform Commission
- Sichuan Provincial Department of Economy and Information Technology
- Sichuan Provincial Department of Education
- Sichuan Provincial Department of Science and Technology
- Sichuan Provincial Ethnic and Religious Affairs Committee
- Sichuan Provincial Public Security Department
- Sichuan Provincial Department of Civil Affairs
- Sichuan Provincial Department of Justice
- Sichuan Provincial Department of Finance
- Sichuan Provincial Department of Human Resources and Social Security
- Sichuan Provincial Department of Natural Resources
- Sichuan Provincial Department of Ecology and Environment
- Sichuan Provincial Department of Housing and Urban-Rural Development
- Sichuan Provincial Department of Transportation
- Sichuan Provincial Water Resources Department
- Sichuan Provincial Department of Agriculture and Rural Affairs
- Sichuan Provincial Department of Commerce
- Sichuan Provincial Department of Culture and Tourism
- Sichuan Provincial Health Commission
- Sichuan Provincial Department of Veterans Affairs
- Sichuan Provincial Emergency Management Department
- Sichuan Provincial Audit Office

=== Directly affiliated special institution ===
- State-owned Assets Supervision and Administration Commission of Sichuan Provincial People's Government

=== Organizations under the government ===
- Sichuan Provincial Administration for Market Regulation
- Sichuan Provincial Sports Bureau
- Sichuan Provincial Bureau of Statistics
- Sichuan Provincial Government Affairs Bureau
- Sichuan Provincial Bureau of Letters and Calls
- National Defense Mobilization Office of Sichuan Provincial People's Government
- Sichuan Provincial Economic Cooperation Bureau
- Sichuan Provincial Forestry and Grassland Bureau
- Sichuan Provincial Radio and Television Bureau
- Sichuan Provincial Medical Insurance Bureau
- Sichuan Provincial Rural Revitalization Bureau

=== Directly affiliated institutions ===
- Sichuan Provincial Bureau of Geology and Mineral Exploration and Development
- Sichuan Provincial Local Chronicles Office
- Sichuan Academy of Agricultural Sciences
- Sichuan Academy of Social Sciences
- China Testing Technology Research Institute
- Sichuan Provincial Archives Bureau
- Sichuan Provincial Animal Husbandry and Food Bureau
- Sichuan Provincial Intellectual Property Office
- Sichuan Provincial Investment Promotion Bureau
- Sichuan Provincial Public Resources Trading Service Center
- Sichuan Intellectual Property Service Center
- Sichuan Special Communications Bureau
- Sichuan Provincial People's Government Cultural and Historical Research Institute

=== Departmental management organization ===
- Sichuan Provincial Government Government Service and Public Resources Trading Service Center.
- Sichuan Provincial Big Data Center.
- The Sichuan Provincial Bureau of Grain and Material Reserves is managed by the Provincial Development and Reform Commission.
- The Sichuan Provincial Prison Administration Bureau is managed by the Provincial Department of Justice.
- The Sichuan Provincial Drug Rehabilitation Administration is managed by the Provincial Department of Justice.
- The Sichuan Provincial Cultural Relics Bureau is managed by the Provincial Department of Culture and Tourism.
- The Sichuan Provincial Administration of Traditional Chinese Medicine is managed by the Provincial Health Commission.
- The Sichuan Provincial Drug Administration is managed by the Provincial Market Supervision Bureau.
- The Sichuan Provincial Energy Bureau is managed by the Provincial Development and Reform Commission.

=== Dispatched agency ===
- Sichuan Tianfu New Area Administration Committee
- Sichuan Provincial People's Government Science City Office
- Sichuan Wolong National Nature Reserve Management Agency (director-level, managed by the Forestry and Grassland Bureau)
- Sichuan Provincial People's Government Office in Beijing
- Sichuan Provincial People's Government Office in Tianjin
- Sichuan Provincial People's Government Office in Shanghai
- Sichuan Provincial People's Government Office in Chongqing
- Sichuan Provincial People's Government Office in Shenyang
- Sichuan Provincial People's Government Office in Hangzhou
- Sichuan Provincial People's Government Office in Xiamen
- Sichuan Provincial People's Government Office in Wuhan
- Sichuan Provincial People's Government Office in Guangzhou
- Sichuan Provincial People's Government Office in Kunming
- Sichuan Provincial People's Government Office in Ürümqi

== See also ==
- Politics of Sichuan
  - Sichuan Provincial People's Congress
  - Sichuan Provincial People's Government
    - Governor of Sichuan
  - Sichuan Provincial Committee of the Chinese Communist Party
    - Party Secretary of Sichuan
  - Sichuan Provincial Committee of the Chinese People's Political Consultative Conference
