= Wei Hong =

Chinese politician

- 魏宏

Governor of Sichuan
- In office 29 January 2013 – 22 January 2016
- Preceded by: Jiang Jufeng
- Succeeded by: Yin Li

Personal details
- Born: May 1954 (age 72) Yinan County, Shandong, China
- Party: Chinese Communist Party
- Education: Changsha Railway Force College

Wei Hong (Chinese: 魏宏; born May 1954) is a Chinese politician who served as the Governor of Sichuan between 2013 and 2016. Prior to his assuming the post of governor, he served as vice governor and head of the Organization Department of the Chinese Communist Party in Sichuan province. He resigned as governor in 2016 following a party investigation into his conduct.

== Rise to power ==
Wei Hong was born in Yinan County, Shandong province. He served in the railway force of the People's Liberation Army from November 1970 to March 1978 and joined the Chinese Communist Party in June 1973. From 1978 to 1979 he studied at the Changsha Railway Force College in Hunan province. He studied economics at the graduate school of Southwestern University of Finance and Economics from 1996 to 1998.

Starting in 1982 Wei worked in Sichuan province; he became a political operative in 1986, joining the provincial party Organization Department. In 1997, he became deputy head of the provincial organization department, and then became the Chinese Communist Party Committee Secretary of Ya'an prefecture from 2000 to 2002, during which Zhou Yongkang served as leader of the party in Sichuan. In September 2002, he became the head of the Organization Department of the Chinese Communist Party of Sichuan province, and then joined the provincial Party Standing Committee several months later. During his tenure at the Organization Department, he promoted Zhou Yongkang associate Li Chongxi, and also introduced then aspiring female local politician Li Jia to Zhou; Li was later promoted to party chief of Ziyang. Zhou, who had by then ascended to the highest echelons of power in Beijing, was said to be fond of Wei, inviting him out to dinner when the latter was in Beijing. Wei was named executive deputy governor of Sichuan province in May 2007.

Surprisingly, however, Wei's name did not appear on the 2012 list of the provincial Standing Committee, but he held onto the post of vice governor. As then-Governor Jiang Jufeng approached retirement age, speculation placed then-deputy provincial party chief and Zhou Yongkang associate Li Chuncheng and Chengdu party chief Huang Xinchu as the likely successors of Jiang; however, Li was placed under investigation for corruption shortly following the 18th Party Congress. Wei and Li were said to have both coveted the governorship; when Li was sacked, Wei became the unwitting beneficiary. As the Sichuan political scene fell into disarray, Wei, who was neither a member nor an alternate member of the Central Committee, nor even a member of the provincial standing committee, emerged as a serious contender.

== Governorship ==
In January 2013, Wei Hong succeeded Jiang as Governor of Sichuan. In 2015, Wei was not part of the entourage of Xi Jinping's state visit to the United States; the president's important visits abroad are usually accompanied by some provincial government leaders. Sichuan was represented, unusually, by the provincial party chief Wang Dongming, sparking rumours that Wei may have been under investigation. For much of December 2015, Wei was observed to be absent in important provincial leadership meetings. On 15 January 2016, Wu Yuliang, Deputy Secretary of the Central Commission for Discipline Inspection, disclosed under heavy questioning that Wei Hong was under investigation for "breaching discipline" and that Wei was spending some time "thinking and reflecting".

On January 22, 2016, Wei resigned the post of the governor of Sichuan, the second sitting provincial governor to have fallen to the axe of the anti-corruption campaign under Xi Jinping. On February 4, 2016, the CCDI announced Wei was removed from all posts and demoted to deputy department-level (futingji). In the investigation report, Wei was said to have dishonoured the party, did not "treasure chances at re-education", and "violated political, organizational and work discipline." He was nonetheless still referred to as "comrade" and did not lose his party membership.

== Family ==
Wei's wife, Gui Jianmei (桂建梅), was an official in Qingyang District, Chengdu. In January 2016, she left her post as CPPCC Party secretary of Qingyang District, a signal that she had been implicated by her husband's investigation.

Political offices
Preceded by Jiang Jufeng	Governor of Sichuan; 2013–2016	Succeeded by Yin Li
Preceded by Jiang Jufeng	Executive Vice Governor of Sichuan; 2007–2013	Succeeded by Zhong Mian
