= Bo Xilai incident =

2012–2013 scandal in China

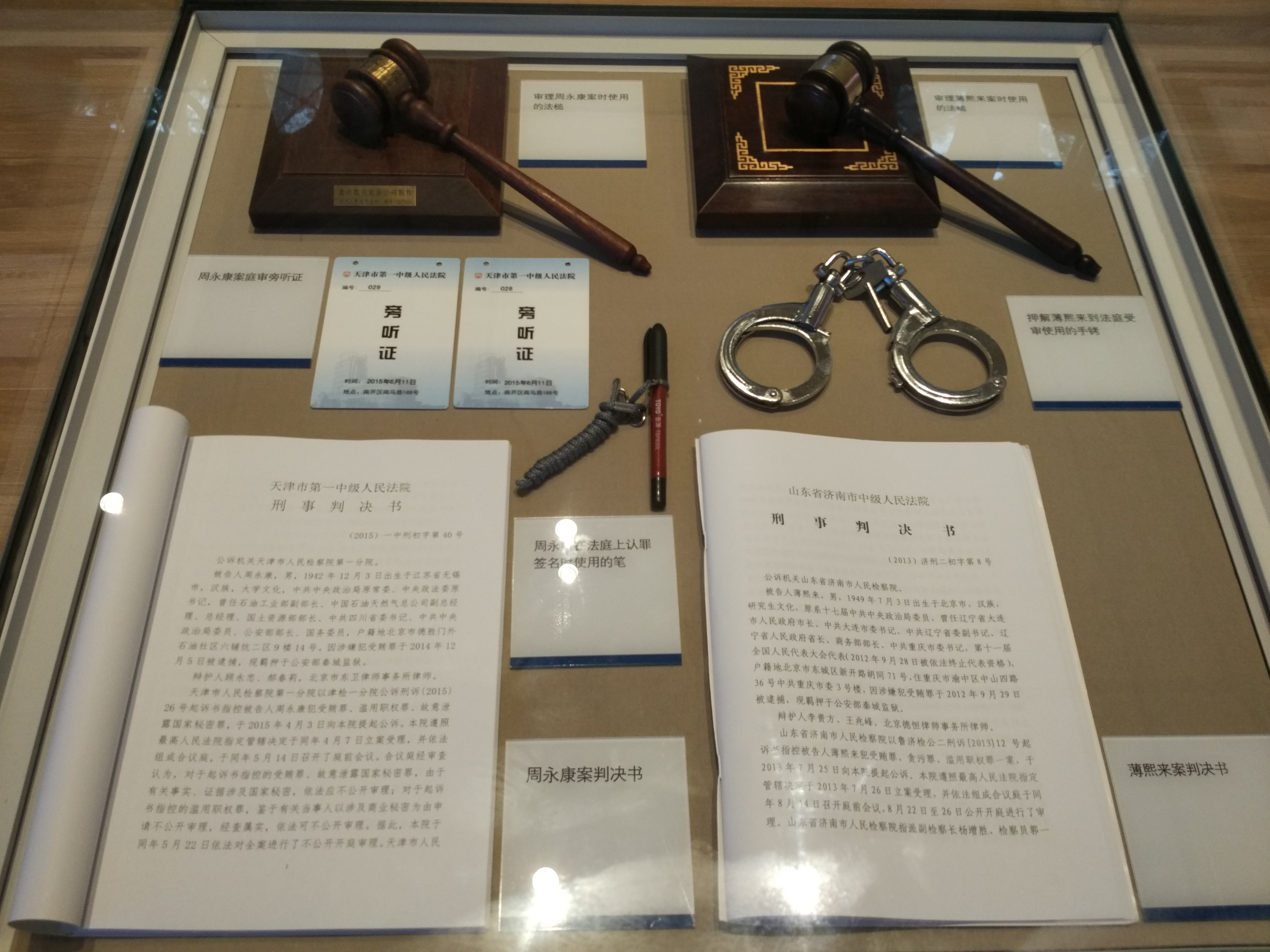
The judgment document and handcuffs used during the trial of Bo Xilai, now in the collection of the China Court Museum (right)

The Bo Xilai incident refers to a series of events that began in the first half of 2012, involving Bo Xilai, member of the Politburo of the Chinese Communist Party and Party Secretary of Chongqing. These events were triggered by the Wang Lijun incident, which led to Bo Xilai's dismissal from the CCP Central Committee, the investigation of his "serious disciplinary problems" by the Central Commission for Discipline Inspection, the reinvestigation of the Neil Heywood death case, and the transfer of Bo Xilai's wife Gu Kailai, Bo Xilai's former confidant Wang Lijun, and Bo Xilai himself to judicial organs for sentencing.

The Bo Xilai case included the bribery, embezzlement, and abuse of power case (referred to as the Bo Xilai case). The Bo Xilai incident had a huge impact on the politics of China. Some political observers, commentators, and media speculated that the incident would affect the pace of China's political reform. Since the dismissal and life imprisonment of Zhao Ziyang, former General Secretary of the CCP Central Committee in 1989, the CCP Central Committee no longer dismissed members of the Politburo on the grounds of political line errors, but began to deal with them on the grounds of violating party discipline and state laws. Bo Xilai was the third member of the Politburo and secretary of a municipality directly under the central government to be dealt with in this way after Chen Xitong and Chen Liangyu. He was imprisoned in Qincheng Prison. During his time in Chongqing, Bo Xilai, who had a strong tendency to show off, did not wear prison clothes but wore suits in prison and enjoyed calligraphy in prison.

== Background ==
In early 2012, Bo visited the Fourteenth Army Group, which his father had helped found in the late 1930s. The visit was alleged to have violated civil-military non-fraternization policies and was viewed by some as evidence of Bo's political ambitions.

On February 2, 2012, the Chongqing Municipal Committee of the Chinese Communist Party decided to remove Wang Lijun from his posts as Director and Party Secretary of the Chongqing Municipal Public Security Bureau. Wang Lijun was appointed as Vice Mayor and put in charge of education and science and technology. At 2:31 PM on February 6, 2012, Wang Lijun entered the U.S. Consulate General in Chengdu and stayed there for one day, which is known as the Wang Lijun Incident. At 10:54 AM on February 8, 2012, the Chongqing Municipal Government Information Office released a message via Xinhua News Agency's official Weibo account, stating that "It is understood that Vice Mayor Wang Lijun, due to long-term overwork, high mental stress, and serious physical discomfort, is currently receiving 'vacation-style treatment' with approval." This led to the phrase "vacation-style treatment" becoming a popular internet meme in mainland China, sparking widespread speculation about Wang Lijun's true whereabouts. On August 22, 2013, at a press conference held by the Jinan Intermediate People's Court in Shandong Province regarding the trial of Bo Xilai, a spokesperson for the court announced that this information had been approved for release by Bo Xilai, then Secretary of the Chongqing Municipal Committee of the Chinese Communist Party.

On February 9, 2012, the spokesperson's office of the Ministry of Foreign Affairs stated in response to inquiries that Wang Lijun, Vice Mayor of Chongqing, entered the U.S. Consulate General in Chengdu on February 6 and left after staying for one day. Relevant authorities are investigating this matter. On February 10, 2012, Bo Xilai led a delegation to inspect Yunnan Province, during which he visited the military history exhibition hall of the 14th Group Army, which was founded by his father, Bo Yibo.

On March 9, 2012, Bo Xilai made his first public statement on the Wang Lijun incident at a press conference of the Chongqing Municipal People's Congress delegation. He said he was heartbroken by the Wang Lijun incident and admitted that he had made a mistake in his personnel selection. This was also the last time Bo Xilai made a public appearance before being placed under investigation. On March 14, 2012, Wen Jiabao, then a member of the Standing Committee of the Politburo and Premier of the State Council, made an unusually harsh criticism at a press conference of the Two Sessions and demanded that the Chongqing Municipal Committee of the CCP and the Chongqing Municipal Government must deeply reflect on the "Wang Lijun incident" and learn from the lessons. In addition, Wen Jiabao also said that the mistakes of the Cultural Revolution and the influence of feudalism have not been eliminated. Some people believe that Wen Jiabao was criticizing the Cultural Revolution on the surface, but in fact he was criticizing Bo Xilai 's governing philosophy of singing red songs and cracking down on gangs.

On March 15, 2012, the first day after the conclusion of the National People's Congress and the Chinese People's Political Consultative Conference (NPC and CPPCC) sessions, the Central Committee of the Chinese Communist Party (CCP) announced that "Comrade Bo Xilai will no longer serve as the Secretary of the Chongqing Municipal Committee of the CCP." He was immediately placed under house arrest and completely disappeared from public view for about a year and a half. Subsequently, Zhang Dejiang, then a member of the Politburo and Vice Premier of the State Council, succeeded Bo Xilai as the Secretary of the Chongqing Municipal Committee of the CCP, and many policies implemented by Bo Xilai during his tenure in Chongqing were subsequently suspended.

On April 10, 2012, the Central Committee of the Chinese Communist Party officially announced that Bo Xilai had been removed from his positions as a member of the Central Committee of the Chinese Communist Party and a member of the Politburo, and was to be placed under investigation within the Party.

On September 28, 2012, the Politburo decided to expel Bo Xilai from the Party and remove him from public office, and transferred his suspected crimes and related leads to judicial organs for handling according to law. On October 26, the Standing Committee of the National People's Congress announced that the Chongqing Municipal People's Congress Standing Committee had removed Bo Xilai from his position as a deputy to the 11th National People's Congress and transferred him to the judiciary. On November 7, the Seventh Plenary Session of the 17th CCP Central Committee confirmed the expulsion of Bo Xilai from the Party by the Politburo.

On January 9, 2013, the Central Commission for Discipline Inspection of the Chinese Communist Party and the Ministry of Supervision of the People's Republic of China held a press conference in Beijing to report on the handling of cases in 2012. Cui Shaopeng, Secretary-General and Spokesperson of the Central Commission for Discipline Inspection, announced at the conference that the case of Bo Xilai, former Secretary of the Chongqing Municipal Committee of the Chinese Communist Party, had been transferred to judicial organs for processing.

On July 25, 2013, relevant Chinese authorities released the news of Bo Xilai's indictment through Xinhua News Agency. The original text is as follows:

The case of Bo Xilai, suspected of bribery, embezzlement, and abuse of power, has been prosecuted by the Jinan Municipal People's Procuratorate of Shandong Province to the Jinan Intermediate People's Court, as designated by law. During the review and prosecution stage, the procuratorial organ informed the defendant Bo Xilai of his litigation rights, interrogated him, and listened to the opinions of his defense counsel. The indictment from the Jinan Municipal People's Procuratorate alleges that Bo Xilai, as a state functionary, abused his position to seek benefits for others, illegally accepting a particularly large amount of money and property; embezzled a large amount of public funds; and abused his power, causing significant losses to the interests of the state and the people, with particularly serious circumstances. He should be held criminally liable for bribery, embezzlement, and abuse of power, and punished for multiple crimes.

At 8:30 a.m. on August 22, 2013, the Fifth Court of the Jinan Intermediate People's Court held a public hearing for the trial of Bo Xilai on charges of bribery, embezzlement, and abuse of power. On the first day of the trial, Bo Xilai denied the prosecutor's charges of bribery and embezzlement.

At 10:00 AM on September 22, 2013, the Jinan Intermediate People's Court sentenced Bo Xilai to life imprisonment for bribery, with deprivation of political rights for life and confiscation of all personal property; to 15 years imprisonment for embezzlement, with confiscation of RMB 1 million of personal property; and to 7 years imprisonment for abuse of power. The court decided to impose a combined sentence of life imprisonment, deprivation of political rights for life, and confiscation of all personal property.

== Dismissal of Bo Xilai ==
On February 11, Canadian Prime Minister Stephen Harper visited Chongqing. Compared with Harper's meeting with Wang Yang, Secretary of the Guangdong Provincial Committee of the Chinese Communist Party, in Guangzhou the day before, Chinese official media chose to report on Harper's meeting with Bo Xilai in a relatively low-key manner. This phenomenon attracted the attention of international media, who speculated on Bo Xilai's political future. On February 14, Bo Xilai met with Bai Lewei, Chairman of the China-Britain Business Council, who was visiting Chongqing. On February 16, Chongqing held its annual law enforcement meeting, which was attended by both Bo Xilai and Mayor Huang Qifan.

During the 2012 Two Sessions, Bo Xilai did not travel to Beijing with the Chongqing delegation. During the meeting, he continued to promote Chongqing's governance experience. On the morning of March 3, some media reported that He Guoqiang, who had served as the Secretary of the Chongqing Municipal Committee of the CCP and was then a member of the Standing Committee of the Politburo and Secretary of the Central Commission for Discipline Inspection, visited the Chongqing delegation and met with members including Bo Xilai and Huang Qifan. He pointed out that the climate in Chongqing is very different from that in Beijing.

March 9 was the Chongqing delegation's open day. The Chongqing delegation met with reporters for the first time. At the press conference, Bo Xilai also gave his first direct answer to the Wang Lijun incident. In an interview with Luqiu Luwei, a reporter from Hong Kong Phoenix TV, he said that he had never expected Wang Lijun's "departure" and that it was "very sudden." "I am heartbroken by this problem. I feel that I have failed in my personnel management." He should reflect on this. However, he emphasized that the title of "anti-gang hero" was not given by the government, but by the people. The people have the freedom to give titles. The achievements of Chongqing's anti-gang campaign were not solely due to the public security bureau, but were the result of the efforts of the public security, procuratorate, and judicial system. When asked by reporters about his political future, he said that he had not considered the 18th National Congress. On the same day, at the plenary meeting of the Chongqing delegation to the National People's Congress, Bo Xilai said that it was "nonsense" for someone to say that his son, Bo Guagua, drove a "red Ferrari." He also said that the tuition fee for Harvard University came from a "full scholarship."

In March 2012, Zhao Qizheng, spokesperson for the National Committee of the Chinese People's Political Consultative Conference, described foreign media reports on the Wang Lijun incident as "puzzle-like," "inaccurate, and even absurd," and pointed out that the Wang Lijun incident was an isolated event.

According to the New York Times and related information, at an internal meeting on March 7, Hu Jintao, Wu Bangguo, Wen Jiabao, Jia Qinglin, Li Changchun, Xi Jinping, Li Keqiang, He Guoqiang and other members of the Standing Committee of the Politburo all supported the decision to remove Bo Xilai from his post, but the decision was resisted by another member of the Standing Committee, Zhou Yongkang. Prior to this, Hu Jintao and Wen Jiabao met with many provincial and ministerial leaders and party elders to seek their support for the decision to remove Bo Xilai from his post, including Jiang Zemin, Li Peng, Qiao Shi, Zhu Rongji and Li Ruihuan. Jiang Zemin even said that Bo's problem had crossed the bottom line of human civilization.

On March 14, 2012, Wen Jiabao, member of the Standing Committee of the Politburo and Premier of the State Council, publicly demanded at a press conference of the Two Sessions that the Chongqing Municipal Committee of the CCP and the Chongqing Municipal Government reflect on the Wang Lijun incident and learn lessons from it.

On March 15, 2012, the day after the National People's Congress and the Chinese People's Political Consultative Conference (NPC and CPPCC)concluded, the CCP Central Committee decided that Bo Xilai would no longer serve as secretary, standing committee member and member of the CCP Chongqing Municipal Committee, and that Zhang Dejiang, member of the Politburo and vice premier of the State Council, would serve as member, standing committee member and secretary of the CCP Chongqing Municipal Committee.

On March 23, the 30th meeting of the Standing Committee of the Third Chongqing Municipal People's Congress voted to appoint He Ting as Vice Mayor of Chongqing Municipal People's Government and Director of Chongqing Municipal Public Security Bureau, and removed Wang Lijun from his positions as Vice Mayor of Chongqing Municipal People's Government and Director of Chongqing Municipal Public Security Bureau. The meeting also reappointed and removed a number of court and procuratorate cadres. On March 27, with the approval of the CCP Central Committee, Chen Cungen, who had gone to the consulate in Chengdu with Chongqing Mayor Huang Qifan to negotiate the Wang Lijun detention incident, was no longer a member of the Standing Committee of the CCP Chongqing Municipal Committee, and was replaced by Xu Songnan.

On March 25, the British Foreign Office formally requested a reinvestigation of Neil Heywood's case. Heywood's name was blocked by Chinese internet censors on the evening of March 25.

On April 10, 2012, Xinhua News Agency, a public institution directly under the State Council of China, was authorized to release a telegram stating that the public security organs were conducting a reinvestigation into the death of Neil Heywood (referred to as "Neil Heywood" in the official report). The official statement said that Bo Xilai's wife, Gu Kailai (referred to as "Bo Gu Kailai" in the official report), had economic conflicts with Heywood. There was evidence that Heywood died from homicide. Gu Kailai and Zhang Xiaojun, a servant of the Bo family, were suspected of committing the crime. The two were suspected of intentional homicide and had been transferred to the judicial organs for handling. At the same time, the Central Committee also decided to suspend Bo Xilai from his post and to investigate his "serious disciplinary problems".

The People's Daily published a commentator article on April 11, 2012, stating that “the death of Neil Heywood is a serious criminal case involving the relatives and staff of the Party and state leaders ” and that the authorities will thoroughly investigate the case, the Wang Lijun incident and Bo Xilai's “serious violations of discipline”, regardless of their position, “there are no special citizens before the law”.

Subsequently, Heywood's widow, Lulu Wang, attempted to leave the country for the UK for safety reasons, but was not allowed to do so and was prohibited from being interviewed by foreign journalists. On September 28, 2012, the Politburo reviewed and approved the "Report on the Investigation of Bo Xilai's Serious Violations of Discipline" submitted by the Central Commission for Discipline Inspection of the CCP, deciding to expel Bo Xilai from the Party and remove him from public office, and to transfer his suspected crimes and related clues to judicial organs for handling in accordance with the law.

The decision of the CCP Central Committee pointed out that during his tenure as a leader in Dalian, Liaoning Province, the Ministry of Commerce, and as a member of the Politburo and secretary of the Chongqing Municipal Committee, Bo Xilai seriously violated discipline, abused his power in the Wang Lijun incident and the Bo Gu Kailai intentional homicide case, committed serious errors and bore great responsibility; used his power to seek benefits for others, and directly and through his family members accepted huge bribes; used his power and Bo Gu Kailai used Bo Xilai's influence to seek benefits for others, and his family members accepted huge amounts of money and property; had or maintained improper sexual relations with multiple women; violated organizational and personnel discipline, made mistakes in personnel selection, and caused serious consequences. In addition, other clues about Bo Xilai's suspected crimes were also discovered during the investigation. It was also stated that "we must resolutely investigate and deal with cases of violations of discipline and law, no matter who is involved, no matter how big or small the power, we must investigate to the end, never tolerate or be soft, and never let any corrupt elements escape the punishment of Party discipline and national law".

== Impact in Chongqing ==
After Bo Xilai stepped down, the position of Secretary of the Chongqing Municipal Committee of the Chinese Communist Party was concurrently held by Zhang Dejiang, then Vice Premier of the State Council, and the campaign of singing red songs and cracking down on gangs in Chongqing came to a temporary end. Many policies during Bo Xilai's tenure were revoked, such as Chongqing TV re-broadcasting advertisements, and the square red song concert also disappeared.

Propaganda boards promoting the " Five Chongqing " initiatives from the Bo Xilai era have been completely dismantled in Chongqing. The "Five Chongqing"—"Livable Chongqing," "Accessible Chongqing," "Forest Chongqing," "Safe Chongqing," and "Healthy Chongqing"—were first proposed by Bo Xilai at the Third Plenary Session of the Third Chongqing Municipal Committee of the Chinese Communist Party on July 20, 2008, after he assumed the position of Chongqing Party Secretary in November 2007. These goals became a strategic decision for Chongqing. On April 11, after Bo Xilai stepped down, large-scale demonstrations erupted in Chongqing, known as the Wansheng Incident. Tens of thousands participated, and many were injured. However, the Chongqing government responded that this incident was unrelated to the Bo Xilai affair.

On August 10, 2013, as Bo Xilai was about to be tried at the Jinan Intermediate People's Court, a small group of people gathered outside the court, demanding his release and expressing their dissatisfaction.

== Expulsion ==
On April 10, 2012, Xinhua News Agency reported:

Given that Comrade Bo Xilai is suspected of serious violations of discipline, the Central Committee has decided, in accordance with the relevant provisions of the Constitution of the Chinese Communist Party and the Regulations on Case Investigation Work of the Discipline Inspection Organs of the Chinese Communist Party, to suspend him from his positions as a member of the Politburo of the Central Committee and a member of the Central Committee, and to initiate an investigation against him by the Central Commission for Discipline Inspection of the Chinese Communist Party.

The media believes that Bo Xilai has been placed under house arrest and is being investigated by the authorities. The Global Times published an editorial entitled “Investigating and punishing officials who violate laws and regulations is not a ‘political struggle’”.

Following Bo Xilai's expulsion from the Party and public office, the Central Committee of the Chinese Communist Party (CCP) launched political study and propaganda campaigns across the country to stabilize public sentiment. For example, on April 10, the Standing Committee of the Chongqing Municipal People's Congress studied and discussed the Central Committee's decision to investigate Bo Xilai for serious disciplinary violations; the Shanxi Provincial Party Committee held a meeting of leading cadres to convey the Central Commission for Discipline Inspection's decision to investigate Bo Xilai; and the enlarged meeting of the Standing Committee of the Tibet Autonomous Region Party Committee conveyed and studied the spirit of relevant central documents.

After April 14, official media outlets such as the Chongqing Daily published a series of editorials, including "Violations of Discipline and Law Are Unpopular," classifying the case as a criminal case.

On September 28, 2012, the Politburo reviewed and approved the "Report on the Investigation of Bo Xilai's Serious Violations of Discipline" submitted by the Central Commission for Discipline Inspection of the CCP, deciding to expel Bo Xilai from the Party and remove him from public office, and to transfer his suspected crimes and related clues to judicial organs for handling in accordance with the law.

On October 26, 2012, the Standing Committee of the National People's Congress issued an announcement : The Standing Committee of the Chongqing Municipal People's Congress removed Bo Xilai from his position as a representative to the 11th National People's Congress. In accordance with the relevant provisions of the Law on Deputies to the National People's Congress, Bo Xilai's representative status was terminated and transferred to the judicial authorities.

On November 7, 2012, the Seventh Plenary Session of the 17th CCP Central Committee confirmed that the Politburo had expelled Bo Xilai from the Party.

On July 25, 2013, the Jinan Municipal People's Procuratorate filed a public prosecution with the Jinan Intermediate People's Court against Bo Xilai for suspected bribery, embezzlement, and abuse of power.

From August 22 to 26, 2013, the Fifth Court of the Jinan Intermediate People's Court held a public hearing for the case of Bo Xilai, who was charged with bribery, embezzlement, and abuse of power. On the first day of the trial, Bo Xilai denied the prosecutor's charges of bribery and embezzlement.

On September 22, the Jinan Intermediate People's Court issued a first-instance judgment: Bo Xilai was sentenced to life imprisonment for bribery, embezzlement, and abuse of power, and was deprived of his political rights for life and all his personal property was confiscated.

On October 25, the Shandong Provincial Higher People's Court publicly announced its verdict in the second instance trial of Bo Xilai's bribery, embezzlement, and abuse of power case, ruling to reject the appeal and uphold the first-instance judgment of life imprisonment/

== Related events ==
On the evening of April 25, 2012, Li Xueming (Bo Xiyong) resigned from his position as executive director and vice president of China Everbright Group). In June 2012, in addition to Neil Heywood, another Frenchman, Patrick de Villiers, who was linked to the Bo Xilai family scandal, was arrested in Cambodia. China's extradition request was rejected. Reuters reported that de Villiers had an unusually intimate relationship with Gu Kailai.

=== Zhou Yongkang case ===
Zhou Yongkang, a member of the Standing Committee of the Politburo and Secretary of the Central Political and Legal Affairs Commission, was investigated for allegedly leaking classified information to Bo Xilai during the handling of the Wang Lijun incident due to his close relationship with Bo Xilai. On July 29, 2014, Zhou Yongkang was formally placed under investigation by the Central Commission for Discipline Inspection. On June 11, 2015, Zhou Yongkang was sentenced to life imprisonment in Tianjin.

=== Sun Zhengcai case ===
In February 2017, the Central Inspection Team inspected Chongqing and criticized the Chongqing Party and government leadership for "promoting cadres with problems," for "weakened Party leadership and weak sense of responsibility" in the city, for shortcomings in studying and implementing the spirit of General Secretary Xi Jinping's series of important speeches, and for not thoroughly eliminating the legacy of Bo Xilai and Wang Lijun. In response to the criticism, Sun Zhengcai, Secretary of the Municipal Party Committee, said that he would thoroughly study and implement the spirit of General Secretary Xi Jinping's important speech on inspection work, resolutely safeguard the authority of the Party Central Committee with Comrade Xi Jinping as the core and the centralized and unified leadership of the Party Central Committee, and fully implement the spirit of General Secretary Xi Jinping's important speech during his inspection of Chongqing.

On the evening of July 24, 2017, Xinhua News Agency released a message that the CCP Central Committee decided to investigate Sun Zhengcai for suspected serious violations of discipline, making him the first incumbent member of the Politburo to be investigated since the 18th CCP National Congress. On May 8, 2018, Sun Zhengcai was sentenced to life imprisonment in Tianjin.

== Analysis ==
According to multiple anonymous sources with ties to the Chinese Communist Party, cited by The New York Times, in August 2011, the telephone conversation between Hu Jintao, then General Secretary of the CCP Central Committee, and officials traveling to Chongqing was wiretapped by Bo Xilai and Wang Lijun. For years, under Bo Xilai's planning, Wang Lijun and Fang Binxing, president of Beijing University of Posts and Telecommunications, established a complete surveillance and wiretapping system in Chongqing. In order to understand the attitudes of other officials towards him, Bo Xilai used this system to wiretap almost all senior CCP officials, including Zhou Yongkang, a member of the Standing Committee of the Politburo. Other wiretapping activities also involved conversations between Hu Jintao and Ma Yi, deputy secretary of the Central Commission for Discipline Inspection and Minister of Supervision, and Liu Guanglei, member of the Standing Committee of the Chongqing Municipal Committee and secretary of the Political and Legal Committee. According to reports, Bo Xilai's wiretapping of Hu Jintao angered the Beijing leadership and triggered the attention and investigation of the Central Commission for Discipline Inspection. On May 1, 2012, Hong Kong's Ta Kung Pao quoted authoritative sources in Beijing as telling reporters from Hong Kong China News Service that the so-called "wiretapping incident" did not exist and was completely fictitious.
