= Yu Lijun =

Yu Lijun may refer to:

- Yu Lijun (water polo), Chinese water polo player
- Yu Lijun (politician), Chinese politician
