= Party Secretary of Chengdu =

Government position in China

Secretary of the Chengdu Municipal Committee of the Chinese Communist Party
- 中国共产党成都市委员会书记
- Emblem of the Chinese Communist Party

- Flag of the Chinese Communist Party
- Incumbent; Cao Lijun since 30 August 2024
- Chengdu Municipal Committee of the Chinese Communist Party
- Type: Party Committee Secretary
- Status: Deputy provincial and ministerial-level official
- Member of: Chengdu Municipal Standing Committee
- Seat: Chengdu
- Nominator: Central Committee
- Appointer: Chengdu Municipal Committee; Central Committee
- Inaugural holder: Zhang Xiushu
- Formation: 1927
- Deputy: Deputy Secretary; Secretary-General

The secretary of the Chengdu Municipal Committee of the Chinese Communist Party is the leader of the Chengdu Municipal Committee of the Chinese Communist Party (CCP). As the CCP is the sole ruling party of the People's Republic of China (PRC), the secretary is the highest ranking post in Chengdu, which outranks the mayor, conventionally being the deputy secretary of the municipal committee. The secretary is also the leader of the Standing Committee of the Chengdu Municipal Committee.

The secretary is officially appointed by the CCP Central Committee based on the recommendation of the CCP Organization Department, which is then approved by the Politburo and its Standing Committee. The secretary could also appointed by a plenary meeting of the Chengdu Municipal Committee, which the candidate must be the same as the one approved by the central government.

The current secretary is Cao Lijun, who took office on 28 June 2024.

== List of party secretaries ==
=== Republic of China ===
Name (English)	Name (Chinese)	Tenure begins	Tenure ends	Note
Zhang Xiushu	张秀熟	October 1927	January 1928	
Liu Rongjian	刘荣简	January 1928	March 1932	Party Secretary of Chengdu County
Ma Jialong	马加龙	March 1932	March 1938	Party Secretary of Chenghua District
Du Fusheng	杜桴生	March 1938	May 1938	
Han Tianshi	韩天石	May 1938	July 1938	
Zhang Xuan	张宣	July 1938	October 1938	
Zhang Wencheng	张文澄	October 1938	June 1940	
Hou Fangyue	侯方岳	June 1940	March 1941	
Wei Zetong	魏泽同	March 1941	September 1941	
Li Dechun	李德椿	September 1941	March 1942	
Wang Zhizhong	王致中	March 1942	May 1946	
Pu Huafu	蒲华辅	May 1946		
Peng Sai	彭塞	Autumn of 1947	February 1948	
Hong Deming	洪德铭	February 1948	1950	

=== People's Republic of China ===
Name (English)	Name (Chinese)	Tenure begins	Tenure ends	References
Li Jingquan	李井泉	12 April 1950	14 January 1953	
Hao Deqing	郝德青	14 January 1953	30 December 1954	
Liao Jingdan	廖井丹	30 December 1954	29 May 1956	
Liao Jingdan	廖井丹	29 May 1956	January 1969	
Sun Hongdao	孙洪道	January 1969	April 1971	
Sun Hongdao	孙洪道	April 1971	August 1974	
Xu Mengxia	许梦侠	August 1974	December 1979	
Mi Jianshu	米建书	December 1979	March 1981	
Mi Jianshu	米建书	March 1981	May 1983	
Wu Xihai	吴希海	May 1983	May 1993	
Huang Yinkui	黄寅逵	May 1993	December 1997	
Tao Wuxian	陶武先	December 1997	December 2000	
Wang Rongxuan	王荣轩	January 2001	June 2003	
Li Chuncheng	李春城	June 2003	November 2011	
Huang Xinchu	黄新初	October 2011	July 2016	
Tang Liangzhi	唐良智	July 2016	March 2017	
Fan Ruiping	范锐平	April 2017	August 2021	
Shi Xiaolin	施小琳	29 August 2021	28 June 2024	
Cao Lijun	曹立军	28 June 2024	Incumbent	
