= Jiang Minkuan =

- 蒋民宽

Governor of Sichuan
- In office May 1985 – January 1988
- Preceded by: Yang Xizong
- Succeeded by: Zhang Haoruo

Personal details
- Born: May 1930 Wu County, Jiangsu, China
- Died: 6 June 2012 (aged 82) Beijing, China
- Party: Chinese Communist Party

Jiang Minkuan (Chinese: 蒋民宽; May 1930 – 6 June 2012) was a politician and engineer of the People's Republic of China. He served as Governor of Sichuan province, deputy director of the State Science and Technology Commission, and deputy head of the United Front Work Department.

== Biography ==
Jiang Minkuan was a native of Wu County (now part of Suzhou), Jiangsu province. He joined the Chinese Communist Party in June 1961. Starting in 1950 he worked as an engineer in the non-ferrous metal industry in Northeast China. In 1952 he studied Russian in Fushun, Liaoning province, and later trained and worked at an aluminium factory in the Ural region of the Soviet Union. After returning to China, he worked as a manager at the state-owned No. 101 Factory starting in 1955. In 1966 he became the deputy chief engineer of the state-owned No. 122 Factory, later promoted to chief engineer and general manager of the factory.

In 1982, Jiang was appointed Deputy Communist Party Chief and Vice Governor of Sichuan province, and three years later was promoted to Governor of Sichuan. He attempted to open up Sichuan's economy by linking it more closely with the Soviet Union and other Eastern European countries. However, his proposal was deemed "unrealistic" by premier Zhao Ziyang and was criticized by Yang Rudai, then Communist Party Chief of Sichuan. Due to his conflict with Yang, Jiang was replaced by Zhang Haoruo as Sichuan governor and transferred to the central government in 1988.

In 1988 Jiang was appointed deputy director of the State Science and Technology Commission and head of the State Intellectual Property Office, and in 1990 he became the executive deputy head of the United Front Work Department, a minister-level position.

Jiang was an alternate member of the 12th Central Committee of the Chinese Communist Party, and a full member of the 13th and 14th Central Committees.

Jiang retired in April 2004. He died on 6 June 2012 in Beijing, aged 82.

Political offices
Preceded by Yang Xizong	Governor of Sichuan; 1985–1988	Succeeded by Zhang Haoruo
