= Zhang Linzhi =

Chinese politician

- 张霖之

Minister of Coal Industry
- In office September 1957 – January 1967
- Premier: Zhou Enlai
- Deputy: Cao Diqiu (mayor)
- Preceded by: Chen Yu
- Succeeded by: Wang Su

Minister of Motor Manufacturing Industry
- In office April 1955 – September 1957
- Premier: Zhou Enlai
- Preceded by: New title
- Succeeded by: Position revoked

First Secretary of the Chongqing Municipal Committee of the Chinese Communist Party
- In office December 1950 – August 1952
- Preceded by: Chen Xilian
- Succeeded by: Cao Diqiu

Personal details
- Born: Zhang Xijun (张锡钧); 1908 Nangong County, Hebei, Qing China
- Died: 1967 (aged 58–59) Beijing, China
- Party: Chinese Communist Party
- Spouse: Li Yunhua
- Education: Yantai Zhifu Army Officer School

Chinese name
- Simplified Chinese: 张霖之
- Traditional Chinese: 張霖之
Transcriptions
Standard Mandarin
- Hanyu Pinyin: Zhāng Línzhī

Zhang Xijun
- Simplified Chinese: 张锡钧
- Traditional Chinese: 張錫鈞
Transcriptions
Standard Mandarin
- Hanyu Pinyin: Zhāng Xījūn

Chongliang
- Chinese: 崇良
Transcriptions
Standard Mandarin
- Hanyu Pinyin: Chóngliáng

Zhang Linzhi (Chinese: 张霖之; 1908 – 22 January 1967), courtesy name Chongliang, was a Chinese politician who served as First Secretary of the Chongqing from 1950 to 1952, Minister of Motor Manufacturing Industry from 1955 to 1957 and Minister of Coal Industry from 1957 to 1967. He was an alternate member of the 8th Central Committee of the Chinese Communist Party. He was a delegate to the 1st, 2nd and 3rd National People's Congress.

== Biography ==
Zhang was born Zhang Xijun (张锡钧) in Nangong County (now Nangong), Hebei, in 1908, during the late Qing dynasty (1644–1911). In 1925, he attended the Nangong Normal Training School (南宫师范讲习所).

In the summer of 1929, he was admitted to Yantai Zhifu Army Officer School (烟台芝罘陆军军官学校) and served in the officer training team of the 21st division of the National Revolutionary Army. In December, he joined the Chinese Communist Party (CCP) and served as secretary of the secret party branch of the training team.

In 1931, he returned to hometown to engage in revolutionary activities. In 1937, the Second Sino-Japanese War broke out, he served as secretary of the CCP Nangong County Committee.

Beginning in 1939, he served in several posts in Hebei-Shandong-Henan Border Region, including deputy party secretary, party secretary, political commissar, head of the Organization Department, and head of the Civil Affairs Department. He was secretary of the CCP Hebei-Shandong-Henan Border Region Committee, political commissar of the Hebei-Shandong-Henan Border Region Military Region and political commissar of the 7th Column of the Hebei-Shandong-Henan Border Region Military Region in October 1945, political commissar of the 11th Column of the Hebei-Shandong-Henan Border Region Military Region in August 1947, deputy political commissar of the 5th Corps of the 2nd Field Army of the People's Liberation Army in February 1949, and vice mayor of Nanjing in April 1949. During his time as vice mayor of Nanjing, he made every effort to assist Mayor Liu Bocheng in carrying out his work and contributed to the social stability and recovery of Nanjing.

After the establishment of the Communist State in 1949, he successively served as member of the CCP Southwest China Bureau Committee, member of the Southwest China Military and Political Committee, second secretary of the CCP Chongqing Municipal Committee, and first secretary of the CCP Chongqing Municipal Committee. He became vice minister of the Second Ministry of Machinery Industry in August 1952. He was promoted to minister of Motor Manufacturing Industry in April 1955, he remained in that position until September 1957, when he was appointed minister of Coal Industry.

In 1966, the Cultural Revolution was launched, he suffered political persecution and was persecuted to death on 22 January 1967.

== Family ==
Zhang married Li Yunhua (李蕴华).

Party political offices
Preceded by Chen Xilian	First Secretary of the Chongqing Municipal Committee of the Chinese Communist Party; 1950–1952	Succeeded by Cao Diqiu
Government offices
New title	Minister of Motor Manufacturing Industry; 1955–1957	Succeeded by Position revoked
Preceded by Chen Yu	Minister of Coal Industry; 1957–1967	Succeeded by Wang Su
