= Zhang Haoruo =

Governor of Sichuan

- 张皓若

Governor of Sichuan
- In office January 1988 – February 1993
- Preceded by: Jiang Minkuan
- Succeeded by: Xiao Yang

Personal details
- Born: 1932 Jiaozuo, Henan
- Died: 27 March 2004 (aged 72) Beijing
- Party: Chinese Communist Party
- Education: Tsinghua University

Zhang Haoruo (Chinese: 张皓若; Wade–Giles: Chang Hao-jo; 1932 – 27 March 2004) was a politician and petroleum engineer of the People's Republic of China. He served as Governor of Sichuan province and Minister of Internal Trade.

== Biography ==
Zhang Haoruo was born in Jiaozuo, Henan province in 1932. He joined the Chinese Communist Revolution in April 1949 and the Chinese Communist Party in 1950.

Political offices
Preceded by Jiang Minkuan	Governor of Sichuan; 1988–1992	Succeeded by Xiao Yang
