= Zhang Zhongwei =

Chinese politician (born 1942)

- 张中伟

Governor of Sichuan
- In office 1999–2007
- Preceded by: Song Baorui
- Succeeded by: Jiang Jufeng

Personal details
- Born: February 1942 (age 84) Guan County, Sichuan
- Party: Chinese Communist Party
- Children: Zhang Tong (张彤)

Zhang Zhongwei (Chinese: 张中伟; born February 1942) is a retired politician of the People's Republic of China. He served as Governor of Sichuan province from 1999 to 2007.

== Biography ==
Zhang Zhongwei was born in February 1942 in Guan County (now Dujiangyan City), Sichuan province. He entered the work force in June 1956 as an accountant in his native Guan County and joined the Chinese Communist Party in September 1960.

Starting in 1959 Zhang worked for the government of Guan County, Wenjiang prefecture, and Peng County, all in Sichuan. From 1983 to 1987 he was a standing committee member of the Communist Party Chengdu committee. In 1987 he became the deputy head of the Organization Department of Sichuan province, and from 1988 to 1993 he was Director of the Agriculture and Animal Husbandry Department of Sichuan.

In February 1993 Zhang Zhongwei became a Vice Governor of Sichuan. In 1999 he was promoted to Acting Governor, replacing Song Baorui. In January 2000 he was elected Governor of Sichuan by the provincial congress. He served as governor until January 2007, when he was succeeded by Jiang Jufeng.

Zhang was a member of the 16th Central Committee of the Chinese Communist Party (2002 –2007).

== Family ==
Zhang Zhongwei's son Zhang Tong (张彤) was born in August 1973. In March 2013 Zhang Tong was appointed mayor of Leshan, a prefecture-level city of Sichuan.

Political offices
Preceded by Song Baorui	Governor of Sichuan; 1999–2007	Succeeded by Jiang Jufeng
