= Huang Xinchu =

Chinese politician

- 黄新初

Vice Chairman of Sichuan People's Congress
- In office January 2017 – February 2021
- Chairman: Wang Dongming; Peng Qinghua

Party Secretary of Chengdu
- In office September 2011 – July 2016
- Preceded by: Li Chuncheng
- Succeeded by: Tang Liangzhi

Personal details
- Born: October 1957 (age 68–69) Xiaogan, Hubei, China
- Party: Chinese Communist Party
- Education: Sichuan United University; Tongji University

Chinese name
- Traditional Chinese: 黃新初
- Simplified Chinese: 黄新初
Transcriptions
Standard Mandarin
- Hanyu Pinyin: Huáng Xīnchū

Huang Xinchu (Chinese: 黄新初; born October 1957) is a retired Chinese politician, best known for serving as the Chinese Communist Party Committee Secretary of Chengdu between 2011 and 2016.

== Biography ==
Huang was born Xiaogan, Hubei province. He joined the workforce in July 1976 as an elementary school teacher; thereafter, he attended Tongji University, and joined the Chinese Communist Party (CCP) in October 1984. He also has a degree in political economics from Sichuan United University (now part of Sichuan University), and a doctorate in economics.

He worked at the Chengdu Engines Company as a technician, engineer, and a leader in the company's Communist Youth League (CYL) wing. He then served as CYL leader in Chengdu, and was elevator to deputy CYL chief in Sichuan province, then was promoted to chief in August 1997. In August 2000 he was elevated to party chief of the Ngawa Prefecture, and in May 2007 named to the Chinese Communist Party Provincial Standing Committee and head of the provincial propaganda department. In November 2011 he was named party chief of Chengdu, capital of Sichuan province, and a sub-provincial city. Shortly following the 18th National Congress of the Chinese Communist Party, Sichuan Governor Jiang Jufeng retired due to age, and Huang was seen as one of the frontrunners to replace Jiang as Governor. However, the post eventually went to Wei Hong.

During the anti-corruption campaign under Xi Jinping, media outlets reported Huang's connections to businessman Liu Han, a local tycoon later executed, and Zhou Bin, son of Zhou Yongkang. The fall of the Chengdu organization department chief, Zhao Miao, also stirred rumors about Huang. Huang's predecessor in Chengdu, Li Chuncheng, was put under investigation in late 2012.

Huang was a delegate to the 16th, 17th, and 18th National Congress of the CCP, and an alternate member of the 18th Central Committee of the CCP.

Government offices
Preceded by Huang Danhua	Secretary of Sichuan Provincial Committee of the Communist Youth League of China; 1997–2000	Succeeded by Yao Sidan
Party political offices
Preceded by Li Chongxi	Communist Party Secretary of Ngawa Tibetan and Qiang Autonomous Prefecture; 2000–2007	Succeeded by Shi Jun
Preceded by Wang Shaoxiong	Head of the Publicity Department of Sichuan Provincial Committee of the Chinese Communist Party; 2007–2011	Succeeded by Wu Jingping
Preceded by Li Chuncheng	Party Secretary of Chengdu; 2011–2016	Succeeded by Tang Liangzhi
