= Governor of Sichuan =

Governor of the Sichuan Provincial People's Government
- 四川省人民政府省长
- National Emblem of China

- Flag of China
- Incumbent; Shi Xiaolin since 4 July 2024
- Sichuan Provincial People's Government
- Type: Governor
- Status: Provincial and ministerial-level official
- Reports to: Sichuan Provincial People's Congress and its Standing Committee
- Nominator: Presidium of the Sichuan Provincial People's Congress
- Appointer: Sichuan Provincial People's Congress
- Term length: Five years, renewable
- Inaugural holder: Li Jingquan
- Formation: May 1952
- Deputy: Deputy Governors; Secretary-General

The governor of Sichuan, officially the Governor of the Sichuan Provincial People's Government, is the head of Sichuan Province and leader of the Sichuan Provincial People's Government.

The governor is elected by the Sichuan Provincial People's Congress, and responsible to it and its Standing Committee. The governor is a provincial level official and is responsible for the overall decision-making of the provincial government. The governor is assisted by an executive vice governor as well as several vice governors. The governor generally serves as the deputy secretary of the Sichuan Provincial Committee of the Chinese Communist Party and as a member of the CCP Central Committee. The governor is the second highest-ranking official in the province after the secretary of the CCP Sichuan Committee. The current governor is Shi Xiaolin, who took office on 4 July 2024.

== List of governors ==
=== People's Republic of China ===
No.	Officeholder	Term of office		Party	Ref.
No.	Officeholder	Took office	Left office	Party	Ref.
Governor of the Sichuan Provincial People's Government
1	Li Jingquan (1908–1989)	August 1952	January 1955	Chinese Communist Party	
Governor of the Sichuan Provincial People's Committee
2	Li Dazhang (1900–1976)	January 1955	May 1968	Chinese Communist Party	
Director of the Sichuan Revolutionary Committee
3	Zhang Guohua (1914–1972)	May 1968	February 1972	Chinese Communist Party	
4	Liu Xingyuan (1908–1990)	February 1972	October 1975	Chinese Communist Party	
5	Zhao Ziyang (1919–2005)	October 1975	December 1979	Chinese Communist Party	
Governor of the Sichuan Provincial People's Government
6	Lu Dadong (1915–1998)	December 1979	December 1982		
7	Yang Xizong (1928–2007)	December 1982	May 1985		
8	Jiang Minkuan (1930–2012)	May 1985	January 1988	Chinese Communist Party	
9	Zhang Haoruo (1932–2004)	January 1988	February 1993	Chinese Communist Party	
10	Xiao Yang (1929–1998)	February 1993	February 1996	Chinese Communist Party	
11	Song Baorui (1937–2022)	February 1996	June 1999	Chinese Communist Party	
11	Zhang Zhongwei (born 1942)	June 1999	January 2007	Chinese Communist Party	
12	Jiang Jufeng (born 1948)	January 2007	January 2013	Chinese Communist Party	
13	Wei Hong (born 1954)	29 January 2013	22 January 2016	Chinese Communist Party	
14	Yin Li (born 1962)	29 January 2016	2 December 2020	Chinese Communist Party	
15	Huang Qiang (born 1963)	2 December 2020	28 June 2024	Chinese Communist Party	
16	Shi Xiaolin (born 1969)	4 July 2024	Incumbent	Chinese Communist Party	
