= Li Desheng =

Chinese general

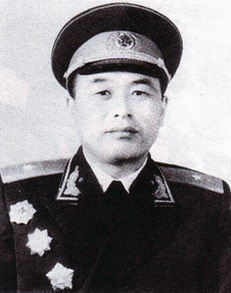

Director of the People's Liberation Army General Political Department
- In office 1969–1975
- Preceded by: Xiao Hua
- Succeeded by: Zhang Chunqiao

Personal details
- Born: 4 May 1916 Guangshan County, Henan, China
- Died: 8 May 2011 (aged 95) Beijing

Li Desheng (Chinese: 李德生; pinyin: Lǐ Déshēng; Wade–Giles: Li Te-sheng; 4 May 1916 – 8 May 2011) was a general in the Chinese People's Liberation Army. He was born in Xin County, Henan, China, an area now known as the "Cradle of Generals" for the large number of senior military officers born in the region. He joined the Chinese Workers' and Peasants' Red Army at the age of 14, in 1930, the Communist Youth League in 1931, and the Chinese Communist Party a year later. He attained the rank of major general in 1955, and general in 1988. The patterns of Li's advancement suggest that he was mentored by Chen Xilian, and that he was closely aligned with You Taizhong. Li Desheng served on the Politburo of the Chinese Communist Party from 1969–1985, one of the most turbulent periods of the People's Republic. He died in Beijing on 8 May 2011.

== Before and after the Second Sino-Japanese War ==
Li was a regiment supply section political instructor in 1934 and a platoon leader in 1937. He participated in the Long March and the Hubei-Henan-Anhui revolutionary bases. During the Second Sino-Japanese War, Li rose from platoon commander in 1937 to company commander in 1938, battalion commander in 1939-43, and regiment commander in 1943-45, all under the leadership of the 129th Division's Liu Bocheng and Deng Xiaoping. Li was the 17th Brigade Commander from 1946–49, and served in the Central Plains Field Army during the Huaihai Campaign. Before the post-liberation reorganization, in which the 17th Brigade reemerged as the 12th Corps of the 2nd Field Army, Li led his 35th Division into the 1951-53 Korean War, rising to the rank of Division Commander. After the Korean War, Li was promoted to major general and returned to Anhui Province in the Nanjing Military Region. Li became Deputy Commander, and later commander, of what eventually became the Jiangsu-based 12th Group Army. Li rose to the rank of Deputy Commander of the Nanjing Military Region in 1968-70.

== Cultural Revolution ==
As the PLA moved to quell the Red Guards and reestablish governmental institutions during the Cultural Revolution, Li assumed the title of Chairman of the Revolutionary Committee (i.e., government and Party committee simultaneously) of Anhui Province in April 1968, a post he formally held for more than seven years. In October of the same year he took part at the 12th plenary session of the 8th Central Committee of the Chinese Communist Party, during which Liu Shaoqi was officially expelled from the Party. A year later, in 1969, he participated at the 9th CCP National Congress, and was elected member of the CCP Central Committee and alternate member of the Politburo, as well as a member of the Central Military Commission.

He saw his authority increase during the downfall of Lin Biao and his allies, apparently with support from Mao Zedong himself. In 1970 he got the post of director of the General Political Department of the People's Liberation Army (a position described as “Military Grand Inquisitor”), and in Autumn 1971 he was appointed first secretary of the CCP Anhui Committee. Shortly after, he was appointed commander of the Beijing Military Region, as part of a plan by Mao to remove Lin Biao's allies from key posts. In September, during Lin's attempted coup and death, Li Desheng took charge of the Beijing defence. In October, he was promoted to vice-chairman of the Central Military Commission.

In 1973, at the 10th CCP Congress, Li was elected a full member of the Politburo, as well as member of the Politburo Standing Committee and Vice-Chairman of the CCP Central Committee. Although he was ranked last among the five vice-chairmen, the combination of his posts made him very influential in Chinese politics.

Mao Zedong, however, soon started to criticize the activity of the Military Commission and to propose a rotation of military region commanders. On December 22, 1973 Li switched posts with Chen Xilian, so becoming commander of the Shenyang Military Region. In the meantime, he apparently clashed with Jiang Qing.

Li resigned during the 2nd plenary session of the 10th CCP Central Committee in January 1975, and politically disappeared until after the coup d’état against the Gang of Four, when he reemerged as a member of the CCP Central Military Commission in August 1977. He also served as head of the Leading Group for the Prevention and Treatment of Endemic Dease in North China in 1977, political commissar of the Leading Group of All-Army Financial and Economical Discipline Inspection, and president of the Chinese Patriotic Programs Federation.

Li’s last jobs were as political commissar of the PLA National Defence University (1985–90) and vice-chairman of the Central Advisory Commission. At the time of his death he held the honorary presidency of the Beijing Institute of Modernization and the All-China Wushu Association, and had been a senior advisor to the China Society of Military Science since 1991.

Political offices
Preceded by Huang Yan as Governor of Anhui	Chairman of the Revolutionary Committee of Anhui; 1968–1973	Succeeded by Song Peizhang; Vacant until 1975
Party political offices
Preceded by Li Baohua; Vacant since 1967	Secretary of the CCP Anhui Committee; 1971–1973	Succeeded by Song Peizhang; Vacant until 1975
Preceded by Lin Biao; Vacant since 1971	Vice Chairman of the Chinese Communist Party; 1973–1975; Served alongside: Zhou Enlai, Kang Sheng, Wang Hongwen, Ye Jianying	Succeeded by Zhou Enlai; Kang Sheng; Wang Hongwen; Ye Jianying; Deng Xiaoping
Military offices
Preceded by Xiao Hua; Vacant since 1967	Director of the General Political Department of the People's Liberation Army; 1970–1975	Succeeded by Zhang Chunqiao
Preceded by Zheng Weishan	Commander of the Beijing Military Region; 1971–1973	Succeeded by Chen Xilian
Preceded by Chen Xilian	Commander of the Shenyang Military Region; 1973–1985	Succeeded by Liu Jingsong
