= Li Chuncheng =

Chinese politician

- 李春城

Deputy Party Secretary of Sichuan
- In office September 2011 – December 2012
- Secretary: Wang Dongming
- Preceded by: Li Chongxi
- Succeeded by: Ke Zunping

Party Secretary of Chengdu
- In office June 2003 – September 2011
- Preceded by: Wang Rongxuan
- Succeeded by: Huang Xinchu

Mayor of Chengdu
- In office February 2001 – June 2003
- Preceded by: Wang Rongxuan
- Succeeded by: Ge Honglin

Party Secretary of Luzhou
- In office August 2000 – January 2001
- Preceded by: Yang Yunhong
- Succeeded by: Xu Bo

Personal details
- Born: April 1956 (age 70) Haicheng, Liaoning, China
- Party: Chinese Communist Party (1978–2014, expelled)
- Spouse: Qu Songzhi
- Children: 1
- Education: Harbin Institute of Technology

Li Chuncheng (Chinese: 李春城; pinyin: Lǐ Chūnchéng; born April 1956) is a former Chinese politician. He spent his early career in Heilongjiang Province, before being transferred to Sichuan in 1998. He served as the Mayor and then Party Secretary of Chengdu, capital of Sichuan province, between 2001 and 2011. He then served as Deputy Party Secretary of Sichuan Province between 2011 and 2012.

Li was dismissed from his positions in December 2012, as the party's internal disciplinary body investigated Li for corruption. He was then expelled from the Chinese Communist Party, convicted on charges of abuse of power and bribery, and sentenced to 13 years in prison. Li was the first official of sub-provincial rank to be investigated for corruption following the ascension of Xi Jinping at the 18th Party Congress. Li was considered an ally of Zhou Yongkang. Li was an alternate member of the 16th and 18th Central Committees of the Chinese Communist Party, but failed to be elected to the 17th Central Committee.

== Early life ==
Li was born in Haicheng, Liaoning in April 1956. He has a brother, Li Chunming (Chinese: 李春明).

== Career ==
=== Heilongjiang ===
During the Cultural Revolution, Li worked as a sent-down youth (zhiqing) in Shuangcheng County, Heilongjiang. He became involved in politics in April 1973 and he joined the Chinese Communist Party in February 1978.

Li entered Harbin Institute of Technology (HIT) in September 1975, majoring in electric engineering, where he graduated in July 1978. Li then became a lecturer at HIT for the next nine years. In 1987, Li, then 31, left teaching to become the Deputy Secretary, then Secretary, of the Harbin Communist Youth League organization. In 1992, Li became Vice Mayor of Harbin. In December 1998, Li was 'seconded' to work in Sichuan province. He spent the nearly the rest of his career in Chengdu.

=== Sichuan ===
From August 2000 to January 2001, Li served as the Party Secretary of Luzhou. Li then served as the Mayor and Deputy Party Secretary of Chengdu between February 2001 to June 2003. At the 16th Party Congress in November 2002, Li, as Mayor of Chengdu, became an alternate member of the Central Committee of the Communist Party, a rare feat for someone who was merely a prefecture-level mayor.

In June 2003, he was promoted to become the Party Secretary of Chengdu and a Standing Committee member of the provincial Party Committee. In 2007, Li, who was in a higher position than he was in 2002, failed to get re-elected as an alternate member of the Central Committee. This was seen as an indication that he had become subject to controversy in provincial political circles.

In September 2011, Li was elevated to the Deputy Party Secretary of Sichuan, in charge of day-to-day work of the province. By this time, Li was considered one of the most powerful figures in the province. Li gained back his alternate membership on the Central Committee at the 18th Party Congress in November 2012, with a seemingly optimistic political trajectory.

=== Corruption investigation ===
On December 5, 2012, state media announced that Li was being investigated by the Central Commission for Discipline Inspection (CCDI) for "serious violations of laws and regulations". Li Chuncheng was the first sub-provincial-level official to fall in what eventually became the toughest anti-corruption campaign in the history of China since 1949, and the first official of his rank to fall under the leadership of Xi Jinping. Li's downfall sent shockwaves through the Sichuan political establishment; it was also seen as a harbinger of the fate awaiting the much more powerful former national leader Zhou Yongkang. On December 6, Shen Yong (申勇), a district-level official, posted lengthy statements to his microblog about Li's alleged wrongdoings. It alleged that Li had spent vast sums of money trying to buy his way to prominence in the Heilongjiang government apparatus, and that he later developed a penchant for "selling" positions in a similar fashion once he was in a position of power, in an attempt to "recoup his investment." The microblog posts further alleged that Li used his position of power to get a manager job for his wife Qu Songzhi at the Chengdu municipal department of health, and, following the 2008 Sichuan earthquake, a director position in the Chengdu Municipal Red Cross.

Li's supporters believe that Li had many positive achievements during his tenure as the top official in Chengdu. They cite his efforts to integrate development of urban and rural regions, his bold initiatives to tear down and renovate old parts of town. They also cited that the GDP in Chengdu grew leaps and bounds, from 100 billion yuan in 1998 to some 700 billion yuan (~$114.5 billion) by 2011. His detractors asserted that Li was quick to demolish old buildings without due process, earning him the nickname of Li Chaicheng (a pun on his name, roughly meaning, "Li who tears down the city".) It was believed that his corruption case was related to the new construction projects that took place as a result of his initiatives to raze old city buildings.

On April 30, 2014, following the investigation by the CCDI, Li was removed from all his posts and expelled from the Chinese Communist Party.

Li reportedly had a close relationship with Deng Hong, the Chairman of Chengdu Exhibition and Tourism Group, and a major investor in development projects around Chengdu. Li was said to have given preferential treatment to Deng and other associates in the procurement of government contracts during his time as the party boss of Chengdu. Li has been accused of carrying out "superstitious acts" while he was in office, including belief in Feng shui. Deng allegedly paid three million yuan (~$488,000) for Li to move the party boss's family graves to a more auspicious burying ground.

Li was indicted on charges of bribery, amassing wealth of unclear origin, and abuse of power, on March 19, 2015. On April 23, 2015, Xianning Intermediate People's Court in Hubei province heard Li Chuncheng's case. Li was convicted on all charges, and was said to have taken bribes amounting to some $6.3 million; however, his sentence was reduced for cooperating with the authorities and voluntarily offering up his assets for scrutiny. He was sentenced 13 years in prison on October 12, 2015.

== Personal life ==
Li married Qu Songzhi (Chinese: 曲松枝), former director of the Red Cross Society of Chengdu. Qu was sentenced to seven years in prison on January 8, 2016. They have a daughter, Li Jinnuo (Chinese: 李金诺). Li was said to have taken bribes through his wife and daughter and given preferential treatment for the activities of his brother.

Party political offices
Preceded by Yang Yunhong	Party Secretary of Luzhou; 2000–2001	Succeeded by Xu Bo
Preceded by Wang Rongxuan	Party Secretary of Chengdu; 2003–2011	Succeeded by Huang Xinchu
Preceded by Li Chongxi	Deputy Party Secretary of Sichuan; 2011–2012	Succeeded by Ke Zunping
Government offices
Preceded by Wang Rongxuan	Mayor of Chengdu; 2001–2003	Succeeded by Ge Honglin
