= Yang Xizong =

Chinese politician (1928–2007)

- 杨析综

Party Secretary of Henan
- In office May 1985 – March 1990
- Preceded by: Liu Jie
- Succeeded by: Hou Zongbin

Governor of Sichuan
- In office April 1983 – May 1985
- Preceded by: Lu Dadong
- Succeeded by: Jiang Minkuan

Personal details
- Born: September 1928 Dayi County, Sichuan, China
- Died: 21 July 2007 (aged 78) Chengdu, Sichuan, China
- Party: Chinese Communist Party
- Education: Sichuan University

Yang Xizong (Chinese: 杨析综; September 1928 – 21 July 2007) was a politician of the People's Republic of China. He served as Communist Party Chief of Henan province and Governor of Sichuan province.

== Biography ==
Yang Xizong was born in 1928 in Dayi County, Sichuan province. As a student at Sichuan University during the 1940s he participated in revolutionary activities organized by the Chinese Communist Party (CCP). He joined the CCP in September 1952.

In January 1963 Yang was appointed mayor of Guanghan County in Sichuan, and in April 1966 he became the Communist Party Chief of Guanghan. He was persecuted during the Cultural Revolution, but was rehabilitated in 1972, and served as mayor and party chief of Pi County. In May 1979 he was promoted to party chief of Wenjiang prefecture, Sichuan.

In January 1982 Yang became the deputy party chief of Sichuan province, and Governor of Sichuan in April 1983. He served as governor for two years before being transferred and promoted to Communist Party Chief of Henan province in May 1985. He held that position until 1990.

In February 1992 Yang Xizong became the Chairman of the Sichuan Provincial People's Congress. He retired in November 1999 and died on 21 July 2007 in Chengdu, aged 78.

Yang was an alternate member of the 12th Central Committee of the Chinese Communist Party, and a full member of the 13th Central Committee.

Political offices
Preceded by Lu Dadong	Governor of Sichuan; 1983–1985	Succeeded by Jiang Minkuan
Party political offices
Preceded by Liu Jie	Party Secretary of Henan; 1985–1990	Succeeded by Hou Zongbin
