= Yu Lijun (politician) =

Chinese politician

- 于立军

Specifically-designated Deputy Communist Party Secretary of Sichuan
- Incumbent
- Assumed office 21 September 2024
- Party Secretary: Wang Xiaohui
- Preceded by: Shi Xiaolin

Head of the Organization Department of the Sichuan Provincial Committee of the Chinese Communist Party
- Incumbent
- Assumed office February 2021
- Preceded by: Wang Zhengpu

Personal details
- Born: August 1967 (age 59) Jianping County, Liaoning, China
- Party: Chinese Communist Party
- Education: Tianjin University

Chinese name
- Simplified Chinese: 于立军
- Traditional Chinese: 于立軍
Transcriptions
Standard Mandarin
- Hanyu Pinyin: Yú Lìjūn

Yu Lijun (Chinese: 于立军; born August 1967) is a Chinese university administrator and politician who is the current Chinese Communist Party Deputy Committee Secretary of Sichuan as of September 2024 and head of the Organization Department of the CCP Sichuan Provincial Committee since February 2021.

He was a representative of the 19th National Congress of the Chinese Communist Party and is a representative of the 20th National Congress of the Chinese Communist Party. He is an alternate of the 20th Central Committee of the Chinese Communist Party.

== Biography ==
Yu was born in Jianping County, Liaoning, in August 1967.

After graduating from Tianjin University in 1989, he worked at the university, where he eventually becoming vice president in 2007. In 2008, he became director of Tianjin Municipal Education Commission, a post he kept until 2011, when he was appointed party secretary of Tianjin University of Technology and Education. In 2013, he was made executive deputy secretary of the Education Working Committee of the CCP Tianjin Municipal Committee, rising to secretary in October 2019.

He was appointed head of the Organization Department of the CCP Sichuan Provincial Committee and president of the Party School in February 2021 and was admitted to member of the Standing Committee of the CCP Sichuan Provincial Committee, the province's top authority.

He was appointed as CCP Deputy Committee Secretary of Sichuan.

Party political offices
Preceded by Wu Bingyue	Communist Party Secretary of Tianjin University of Technology and Education; 2011–2013	Succeeded by Meng Qingguo
Preceded by Zhang Bingjiang	Communist Party Secretary of Jizhou District; 2016–2019	Succeeded by Wang Lijun (born 1968)
Preceded by Cheng Lihua	Secretary of the Education Working Committee of the Tianjin Municipal Committee of the Chinese Communist Party; 2019–2021	Succeeded by Wang Tingkai
Preceded by Wang Zhengpu	Head of the Organization Department of the Sichuan Provincial Committee of the Chinese Communist Party; 2021–2025	Succeeded by Jin Lei
Preceded by Shi Xiaolin	Specifically-designated Deputy Communist Party Secretary of Sichuan; 2024–	Incumbent
