= Yang Kening =

Chinese politician (born 1962)

- 杨克宁

Vice Chairman of the Sichuan Provincial Committee of the Chinese People's Political Consultative Conference
- In office February 2021 – January 2023
- Chairman: Ke Zunping; Tian Xiangli

Personal details
- Born: January 1962 (age 64) Xiaojin County, Sichuan, China
- Party: Chinese Communist Party (1987–2024; expelled)
- Education: Aba Finance and Trade School; Party School of the Sichuan Provincial Committee of the Chinese Communist Party; Sichuan University of Business Administration

Chinese name
- Simplified Chinese: 杨克宁
- Traditional Chinese: 楊克寧
Transcriptions
Standard Mandarin
- Hanyu Pinyin: Yáng Kèníng

Yang Kening (Chinese: 杨克宁; born January 1962) is a former Chinese politician of Tibetan ethnicity who spent his entire career in southwest China's Sichuan province. He was investigated by China's top anti-graft agency in November 2023. Previously he served as vice chairman of the Sichuan Provincial Committee of the Chinese People's Political Consultative Conference.

He was a delegate to the 13th National People's Congress.

== Early life and education ==
Yang was born in Xiaojin County, Sichuan, in January 1962.

== Career ==
After graduating from Aba Finance and Trade School in 1982, he became accountant of the People's Canteen of Jinchuan County Commercial Bureau.

Yang joined the Chinese Communist Party (CCP) in May 1987, and got involved in politics in April 1988, when he was appointed secretary of the Office of the People's Government of Jinchuan County. He was eventually promoted to director of the Office of CCP Jinchuan County Committee in January 1993.

Starting in April 1995, he served in several posts in the CCP Ngawa Tibetan and Qiang Autonomous Prefectural Committee, including deputy director of the Party Building Office, deputy director of the Organization Department, and deputy secretary-general.

He was party secretary of Zamthang County in October 2002, in addition to serving as chairman of the People's Congress. It would be his first job as "first-in-charge" of a county.

He was executive deputy head of the Organization Department of the CCP Ngawa Tibetan and Qiang Autonomous Prefectural Committee in December 2004 and subsequently head of the United Front Work Department of the CCP Ngawa Tibetan and Qiang Autonomous Prefectural Committee in December 2006. In January 2007 he was admitted to member of the CCP Ngawa Tibetan and Qiang Autonomous Prefectural Committee, the prefecture's top authority and soon was appointed secretary of the Political and Legal Affairs Commission of the CCP Ngawa Tibetan and Qiang Autonomous Prefectural Committee. In December 2011 he was promoted to become chairman of the Ngawa Tibetan and Qiang Autonomous Prefectural Committee of the Chinese People's Political Consultative Conference, a position he held until February 2015, when he was chosen as deputy party secretary and governor of the prefecture.

In February 2021, he took the position of vice chairman of the Sichuan Provincial Committee of the Chinese People's Political Consultative Conference, the provincial advisory body.

== Downfall ==
On 16 November 2023, he was suspected of "serious violations of laws and regulations" by the Central Commission for Discipline Inspection (CCDI), the party's internal disciplinary body, and the National Supervisory Commission, the highest anti-corruption agency of China.

On 23 May 2024, Yang was expelled from the CCP and dismissed from public office. The Supreme People's Procuratorate signed an arrest order for him for taking bribes. On September 19, he was indicted on suspicion of accepting bribes, firearms and ammunition possession. On December 19, he stood trial at the Intermediate People's Court of Nantong for bribery, firearms and ammunition possession, prosecutors accused Yang of taking advantage of his different positions in Sichuan between 2003 and 2023 to seek profits for various companies and individuals in contracting of engineering projects and business operation, in return, he received bribes worth more than 72 million yuan ($10 million) either by himself or through some of his close relatives.

On 24 February 2025, Yang was eventually sentenced to a 16-year jail and fined 4 million yuan for taking bribes, all property gained from the bribery would be turned over to the national treasury.

Government offices
Preceded by Wu Zegang	Governor of Ngawa Tibetan and Qiang Autonomous Prefecture; 2015–2021	Succeeded by Luo Zhenyu (罗振华)
