= Huang Zhendong =

Chinese politician

Huang Zhendong (Chinese: 黄镇东; born 1941) is a former Chinese politician who served as Chinese Communist Party Committee Secretary of Chongqing, and prior to that, the Minister of Transport.

Huang was born in Dafeng, Jiangsu. He graduated from Nanjing Navigation Engineering College in 1962 (later known as Shanghai Maritime University). In 1963 he was assigned to work in the Port of Qinhuangdao. By 1982, he was promoted to the head of administration at the Port. In 1985, he was named Vice Minister of Transportation. In 1988 he became president of the National Transportation Investment Company. In 1991 he became Minister of Transport.

In October 2002 he was transferred to work in Chongqing, a megacity on the western interior. In December 2005 he left his post to sit on the National People's Congress Internal and Judicial Affairs Committee. Between 2008 and 2013, Huang was the chair of the committee.

Huang was a member of the 14th, 15th, and 16th Central Committees of the Chinese Communist Party, and a Standing Committee member of the 11th National People's Congress.

== See also ==
- Politics of Chongqing

Party political offices
Preceded by He Guoqiang	Communist Party Secretary of Chongqing; 2002–2005	Succeeded by Wang Yang
Government offices
Preceded by Qian Yongchang	Minister of Transport; 1991–2002	Succeeded by Zhang Chunxian
