= Li Xinhua =

Chinese former oil executive (born 1953)

- 李新华

Deputy General Manager of China National Petroleum Corporation
- In office April 2007 – July 2013
- Chairman: Jiang Jiemin

Vice-Governor of Yunnan
- In office January 2003 – April 2007
- Governor: Xu Rongkai→Qin Guangrong

Personal details
- Born: January 1953 (age 73) Qidong County, Hunan, China
- Party: Chinese Communist Party
- Education: Kunming University of Science and Technology

Chinese name
- Traditional Chinese: 李新華
- Simplified Chinese: 李新华
Transcriptions
Standard Mandarin
- Hanyu Pinyin: Lǐ Xīnhuá

Li Xinhua (Chinese: 李新华; born January 1953) is a retired Chinese oil executive and politician who served as deputy general manager of China National Petroleum Corporation (CNPC) from 2007 to 2013 and vice-governor of Yunnan from 2003 to 2007. He has retired for almost six years. He was investigated by China's top anti-graft agency in March 2019.

== Early life and education ==
Li was born in Qidong County, Hunan, in January 1953. In March 1969, he enlisted in the People's Liberation Army (PLA), serving in the Yunnan Production and Construction Corps. In March 1972, he entered Kunming Institute of Technology (now Kunming University of Science and Technology), where he graduated in September 1975.

== Career ==
Beginning in 1975, he served in several posts in Yunnan Natural Gas Chemical Plant, including secretary of the Youth League Committee, workshop director, deputy director, and director. After the institutional reform, he served as chairman, general manager and deputy party chief of Yunnan Natural Gas Group Co., Ltd.. He rose to become party chief in June 1995.

He began his political career in April 2002, when he was appointed assistant governor of Yunnan. In January of the following year, he was installed as vice-governor. He was deputy general manager of China National Petroleum Corporation (CNPC) in April 2007, and held that office until his retirement in July 2013.

== Investigation ==
On March 22, 2019, he has come under investigation by the Central Commission for Discipline Inspection (CCDI), the party's internal disciplinary body, and the National Supervisory Commission, the highest anti-corruption agency of China, said in a statement on their website, without elaborating. His superior in China National Petroleum Corporation, chairman Jiang Jiemin, was removed from his post and came under investigation for corruption in September 2013. His superior, governor Qin Guangrong, turned himself in to the government and was placed under investigation on May 9, 2019.

On April 23, 2020, he was indicted on suspicion of accepting bribes.
