= Qian Min =

Chinese politician

Qian Min (Chinese: 钱敏; 9 August 1915 – 6 January 2016) was a Chinese politician. He was born in Wuxi, Jiangsu. He was the Chinese Communist Party Committee Secretary and Mayor of Chongqing.

Preceded by Lu Dadong	Communist Party Chief and Mayor of Chongqing	Succeeded by Ding Changhe
