= Lan Yinong =

Chinese politician

Lan Yinong (Chinese: 蓝亦农; 1919 – February 14, 2008) original name Lan Yenong (Chinese: 蓝野农), was a politician of the People's Republic of China. He was born in Chaling County, Hunan Province. He was Chinese Communist Party Committee Secretary and Mayor of Chongqing. He was also the Chinese Communist Party Committee Secretary and Governor of Guizhou Province.

Preceded by Ren Baige	Communist Party Chief and Mayor of Chongqing	Succeeded by Duan Siying
Preceded by Li Zaihe	Communist Party Chief and Governor of Guizhou	Succeeded by Lu Ruilin
