= Ge Honglin =

Chinese politician

Ge Honglin (Chinese: 葛红林; pinyin: Gě Hónglín; born 1956) is a Chinese politician, business executive, and current CEO of Aluminum Corporation of China Limited. Between 2001 and 2014 he served as Mayor of Chengdu.

Ge was born in Nantong, Jiangsu province and was a graduate of Beijing University of Science and Technology majoring in Material Science and Engineering. From July 1995 to November 1998 he served as the Board Director and Vice President of Shanghai Metallurgical Holdings.

In October 2001, he became the Deputy Secretary of Chengdu Municipal Party Committee and the Mayor of Chengdu in Sichuan Province, heading the government of the Sichuan provincial capital; for most of his tenure in Chengdu, he worked under Chengdu party chief Li Chuncheng. Li was later charged with corruption-related offenses.

In 2014, he resigned as mayor of Chengdu to take on the position of chief executive of Aluminum Corporation of China Limited.
