= He Yunfeng =

Chinese politician

He Yunfeng (Chinese: 何云峰; January 1922 – January 6, 2013) was a Chinese politician and major general of the People's Liberation Army. He was born in Pingchang County, Bazhong, Sichuan Province. In March 1933, at the age of 11, he joined the Chinese Workers' and Peasants' Red Army and participated in the Long March. During the Second Sino-Japanese War, he fought in the Hundred Regiments Offensive. During the Chinese Civil War, he participated in the Shangdang Campaign, Linfen-Fushan Campaign, Huaihai Campaign. After the creation of the People's Republic of China, he served as Chinese Communist Party Committee Secretary and Mayor of Chongqing.
