= Li Chongxi =

Chinese politician (born 1951)

- 李崇禧

Chairman of the Sichuan Provincial Committee of the Chinese People's Political Consultative Conference
- In office January 2013 – January 2014
- Preceded by: Tao Wuxian
- Succeeded by: Ke Zunping

Deputy Communist Party Secretary of Sichuan
- In office May 2002 – September 2011
- Secretary: Liu Qibao
- Preceded by: Wang Sanyun
- Succeeded by: Li Chuncheng

Secretary of Sichuan Provincial Commission for Discipline Inspection of the Chinese Communist Party
- In office May 2002 – May 2007
- Preceded by: Shen Guojun
- Succeeded by: Ou Zegao

Secretary-General of CPC Sichuan Provincial Committee
- In office August 2000 – May 2002
- Party Secretary: Zhou Yongkang
- Preceded by: Feng Chongtai
- Succeeded by: Guo Yongxiang

Communist Party Secretary of Ngawa Tibetan and Qiang Autonomous Prefecture
- In office March 1996 – August 2000
- Preceded by: Liu Zhongshu
- Succeeded by: Huang Xinchu

Personal details
- Born: January 1951 (age 75) Jianyang, Sichuan, China
- Party: Chinese Communist Party (1975–2014, expelled)
- Education: Sichuan University of Finance and Economics

Li Chongxi (Chinese: 李崇禧; pinyin: Lǐ Chóngxǐ; born January 1951) is a former Chinese politician. From 2013 to 2014, Li served as chairman of the Sichuan Provincial Committee of the Chinese People's Political Consultative Conference, a mostly ceremonial legislative consultation body. Prior to that, Li served as the deputy party secretary of Sichuan province. Li Chongxi has been linked to disgraced former Politburo Standing Committee member Zhou Yongkang.

== Career ==
Li was born in Jianyang, Sichuan in January 1951. Li got involved in politics in April 1972 and he joined the Chinese Communist Party in May 1975.

After taking the National Higher Education Entrance Examination (NCEE) in 1977, Li entered Sichuan University of Finance and Economics in September 1978, majoring in public finance and graduated in August 1982. After graduation, Li worked in Chengdu as an officer.

In March 1995 he was promoted to become the vice-secretary of Garzê Tibetan Autonomous Prefecture, a position he held until March 1996, when he was transferred to Ngawa Tibetan and Qiang Autonomous Prefecture and appointed its party secretary. Li served as a Standing Committee member of the CPC Sichuan Committee and Secretary of Sichuan between August 2000 to May 2002.

Li was elevated to the deputy party secretary of Sichuan in May 2002, he remained in that position until September 2011. Li's time in provincial politics saw him work under four successive party secretaries, including Zhou Yongkang, Zhang Xuezhong, Liu Qibao, and Du Qinglin.

In January 2013, Li was promoted to become chairman of the Sichuan Provincial Committee of the Chinese People's Political Consultative Conference, earning him full provincial status for the first time in his life.

== Downfall ==
On December 29, 2013, Li was being investigated by the Central Commission for Discipline Inspection for "serious violations of laws and regulations". On January 16, 2014, Li was dismissed from his positions. On September 11, 2014, Li was expelled from the Chinese Communist Party. His successor was selected a year later.

Li Chongxi was indicted on charges of bribery on April 17, 2015. and handed from the Party's disciplinary agents to Nanchang Municipal Intermediate People's Court. On November 3, 2015, the court found him guilty on all counts, including taking bribes worth around 11.1 million yuan (US$1.75 million). Li was sentenced 12 years in jail, and his digital recorder was also confiscated.

Party political offices
Preceded by Liu Zhongshu	Communist Party Secretary of Ngawa Tibetan and Qiang Autonomous Prefecture; 1996–2000	Succeeded by Huang Xinchu
Preceded by Feng Chongtai	Secretary-General of CPC Sichuan Provincial Committee; 2000–2002	Succeeded by Guo Yongxiang
Preceded by Shen Guojun	Secretary of Sichuan Provincial Commission for Discipline Inspection of the Chinese Communist Party; 2002–2007	Succeeded by Ou Zegao
Preceded by Wang Sanyun	Deputy Communist Party Secretary of Sichuan; 2002–2011	Succeeded by Li Chuncheng
Assembly seats
Preceded by Tao Wuxian	Chairman of the Sichuan Provincial Committee of the Chinese People's Political Consultative Conference; 2013–2014	Succeeded by Ke Zunping
