= Ke Zunping =

Chinese politician

- 柯尊平

Chairman of the Sichuan Provincial Committee of the Chinese People's Political Consultative Conference
- In office January 2015 – January 2022
- Preceded by: Li Chongxi
- Succeeded by: Tian Xiangli

Personal details
- Born: September 1956 (age 70) Ankang Prefecture, Shaanxi, China
- Party: Chinese Communist Party
- Education: Southwest Jiaotong University

Ke Zunping (Chinese: 柯尊平; pinyin: Kē Zūnpíng; born September 1956) is a Chinese politician who served as chairman of the Sichuan Provincial Committee of the Chinese People's Political Consultative Conference between 2015 and 2022.

Ke was a representative of the 17th National Congress of the Chinese Communist Party and an alternate of the 18th Central Committee of the Chinese Communist Party. He was a delegate to the 10th National People's Congress. He was a member of the 13th National Committee of the Chinese People's Political Consultative Conference and is a member of the 14th National Committee of the Chinese People's Political Consultative Conference.

== Early life and education ==
Ke was born in Ankang Prefecture (now Ankang), Shaanxi, in September 1956. During the late Cultural Revolution, he worked as a sent-down youth in his hometown from 1974 to 1977. He joined the Chinese Communist Party (CCP) in September 1975. In 1978, he enrolled at Southwest Jiaotong University, and worked at the university after graduation. At Southwest Jiaotong University, he eventually became vice president in August 1995 and party secretary of the university in March 1999.

== Career ==
Ke began his political career in August 2000, when he was named assistant governor of southwest China's Sichuan province. He became vice governor in February 2001. He was appointed head of the Organization Department of the CCP Sichuan Provincial Committee and president of the Provincial Party School in May 2007 and was admitted to member of the CCP Sichuan Provincial Committee, the province's top authority. He was made deputy party secretary in April 2013. In January 2015, he was chosen as chairman of the Sichuan Provincial Committee of the Chinese People's Political Consultative Conference, the provincial advisory body.

In March 2022, Ke took office as vice chairperson of the Education, Science, Health and Sports Committee of the National Committee of the Chinese People's Political Consultative Conference.

Party political offices
Preceded by Li Zhisong (李植松)	Communist Party Secretary of Southwest Jiaotong University; 1999–2001	Succeeded by Gu Liya (顾利亚)
Preceded by Wei Hong	Head of the Organization Department of Sichuan Provincial Committee of the Chinese Communist Party; 2007–2013	Succeeded by Fan Ruiping
Preceded by Jiang Jufeng	Specifically-designated Deputy Communist Party Secretary of Sichuan; 2013–2015	Succeeded by Yin Li
Assembly seats
Preceded by Li Chongxi	Chairman of the Sichuan Provincial Committee of the Chinese People's Political Consultative Conference; 2015–2022	Succeeded by Tian Xiangli
