= Shi Xiaolin =

Chinese politician

- 施小琳
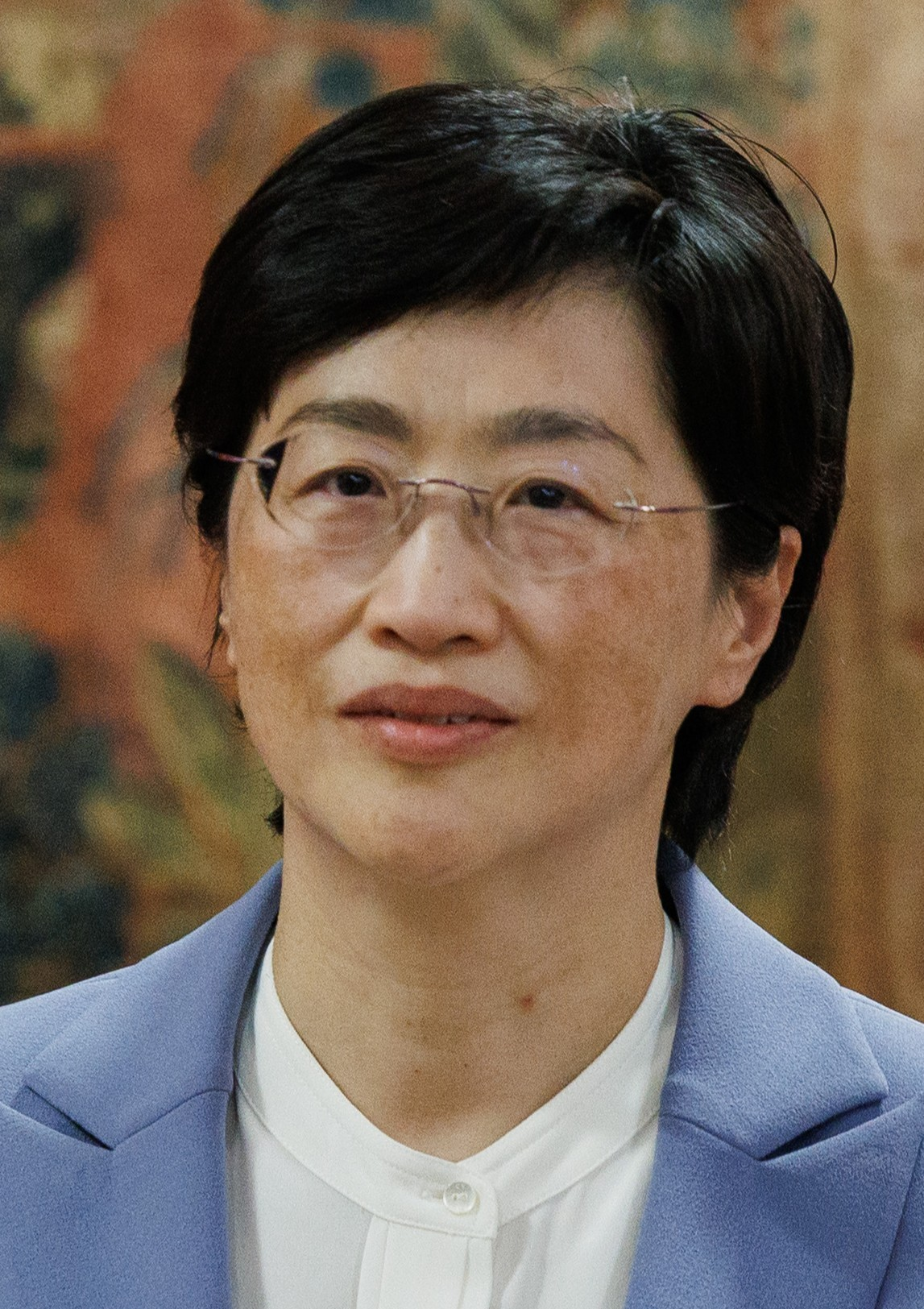
- Shi in 2026

Governor of Sichuan
- Incumbent
- Assumed office 4 July 2024
- Party Secretary: Wang Xiaohui
- Preceded by: Huang Qiang

Specifically-designated Deputy Party Secretary of Sichuan
- In office 3 July 2023 – 4 July 2024
- Party Secretary: Wang Xiaohui
- Preceded by: Luo Wen
- Succeeded by: Yu Lijun

Party Secretary of Chengdu
- In office 29 August 2021 – 28 June 2024
- Deputy: Wang Fengzhao (mayor)
- Preceded by: Fan Ruiping
- Succeeded by: Cao Lijun

Personal details
- Born: May 1969 (age 57) Yuyao County, Zhejiang, China
- Party: Chinese Communist Party
- Education: Shanghai University (UG); Tongji University (MBA)

Shi Xiaolin (Chinese: 施小琳; pinyin: Shī Xiǎolín; born May 1969) is a Chinese politician currently serving as the governor of Sichuan, in office since 4 July 2024. She was previously the Party Secretary of Chengdu, capital of the province. She was an alternate of the 19th Central Committee of the Chinese Communist Party and a member of the 13th National Committee of the Chinese People's Political Consultative Conference. She is an alternate of the 20th Central Committee of the Chinese Communist Party.

She started her career in the Communist Youth League of China in Shanghai, where she eventually became a member of the standing committee of the Shanghai Municipal Committee of the Chinese Communist Party, the city's top authority. After a short term of two years in central China's Jiangxi province, in August 2021, she was transferred to southwest China's Sichuan province and appointed party secretary, the top political position in the city.

== Early life and education ==
Shi was born in Yuyao County, Zhejiang, in May 1969.

She graduated from Shanghai University with a major in electrical technology 1990 and received a Master of Business Administration from Tongji University in 2001. She started her career in government service after university.

== Career in Shanghai ==
Shi entered the workforce in July 1990, and joined the Chinese Communist Party (CCP) in June 1993. She served in various posts in Zhabei District Committee of the Communist Youth League of China before serving as director and party branch secretary of Zhabei District Economic Committee in 2003. She became vice governor of Nanhui District in 2006 before being assigned to the similar position in Hongkou District in 2009. She was deputy party secretary of Hongkou District in 2011, but having held the position for only two years. In 2013, she was appointed director and party branch secretary of Shanghai Civil Affairs Bureau. She rose to become party secretary of Putuo District in April 2015. In May 2017, she was promoted to be a member of the standing committee of the CCP Shanghai Municipal Committee, the city's top authority, concurrently holding the post of head of the United Front Work Department of CCP Shanghai Municipal Committee.

== Career in Jiangxi ==
In May 2018, Shi was transferred to central China's Jiangxi province, where she was a member of the standing committee of the CCP Jiangxi Provincial Committee and head of the Publicity Department of CCP Jiangxi Provincial Committee.

== Career in Sichuan ==
On 29 August 2021, Shi was transferred again to southwest China's Sichuan province and appointed party secretary of the capital city of Chengdu, the top political position in the city, and a member of the standing committee of the CCP Sichuan Provincial Committee, the province's top authority. She was China's youngest top official in the provincial capital and was at the time the youngest member of a CCP Provincial Standing Committee until the October 2021 appointment of Yang Fasen.

On 28 June 2024, Shi was appointed party branch secretary of Sichuan.

On 4 July 2024, Shi rose to become the acting governor of Sichuan, and was elected as the governor of Sichuan on 31 July 2024.

Government offices
Preceded by Ma Yili	Director of Shanghai Civil Affairs Bureau; 2013–2015	Succeeded by Zhu Qinhao
Preceded by Huang Qiang	Governor of Sichuan; 2024–present	Incumbent
Party political offices
Preceded by Zhang Guohong	Party Secretary of Putuo District; 2015–2017	Succeeded by Cao Liqiang
Preceded by Sha Hailin	Head of United Front Work Department of CCP Shanghai Municipal Committee; 2017–2018	Succeeded by Zheng Gangmiao
Preceded by Zhao Liping	Head of the Publicity Department of CCP Jiangxi Provincial Committee; 2018–2021	Succeeded by Liang Gui
Preceded by Fan Ruiping	Party Secretary of Chengdu; 2021–2024	Succeeded by Cao Lijun
Preceded by Luo Wen	Specifically-designated Deputy Party Secretary of Sichuan; 2023–2024	Succeeded by Yu Lijun
