= Jiang Jufeng =

Chinese politician

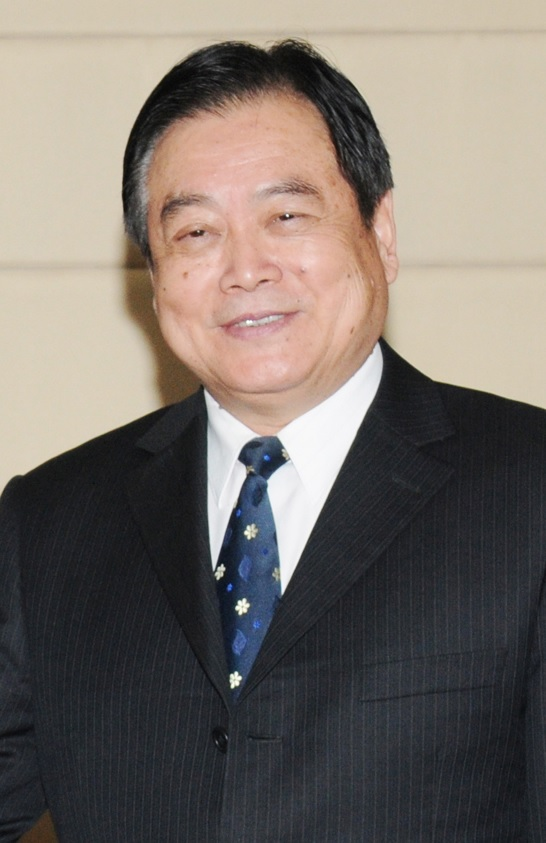
Jiang Jufeng

Jiang Jufeng (Chinese: 蒋巨峰; pinyin: Jiǎng Jùfēng; born 1948) is a Chinese politician. He served as the Governor of Sichuan from 2007 to 2013.

Jiang was born in 1948 in Zhuji, Zhejiang Province. He graduated from Fudan University in 1982 and the same year joined the Chinese Communist Party. From June 1998 to March 2002 he served as a secretary for CPC's Wenzhou City Party Committee in Zhejiang. As of January 23, 2017, Jufeng is a Governor of Sichuan Province, which he became after he succeeded longtime Governor Zhang Zhongwei, who was in office from June 1999 to January 2007. Jiang was re-elected Governor on January 27, 2008, at the first session of the 11th Sichuan Provincial People's Congress. He left office in 2013, then joined the National People's Congress Environment Protection and Resources Conservation Committee as a deputy chair.

Preceded by Zhang Zhongwei	Governor of Sichuan; 2007–2013	Succeeded by Wei Hong
