= Xiao Yang (governor) =

Chinese politician (1929–1998)

Xiao Yang (Chinese: 肖秧; pinyin: Xiāo Yāng; 1929 – October 9, 1998), born as Chen Zheng (陈峥), was a politician of the People's Republic of China.

== Biography ==
Xiao Yang was born in Langzhong, Sichuan in 1929. He was educated in Tsinghua University from 1946 to 1948.

Xiao Yang was the Mayor of Chongqing from 1985 to 1988, Secretary of the CPC Chongqing Committee from 1988 to 1992, and Governor of Sichuan from 1993 to 1996.

Xiao was an alternate member of the 14th CPC Central Committee.

== Notes ==
| Preceded by Yu Hanqing | Mayor of Chongqing; 1985–1988 | Succeeded by Sun Tongchuan |
| Preceded by Liao Bokang | Secretary of the CPC Chongqing Committee; 1988–1992 | Succeeded by Sun Tongchuan |
| Preceded by Zhang Haoruo | Governor of Sichuan; 1993–1996 | Succeeded by Song Baorui |
