= Ren Baige =

Chinese politician

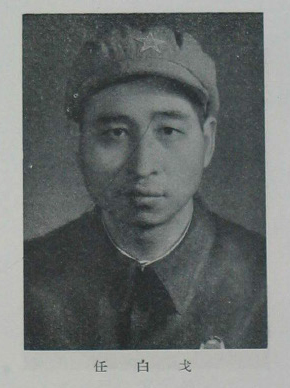
Ren Baige

Ren Baige (Chinese: 任白戈) (1906–1986) was a Chinese politician. He was born in Nanchong, Sichuan Province. He joined the Chinese Communist Party in 1926. He later joined the League of Left-Wing Writers. During the Second Sino-Japanese War, he was in Yan'an. He was vice governor of Sichuan Province, mayor and Chinese Communist Party Committee Secretary of Chongqing.

Preceded by Yan Hongyan	Communist Party Chief of Chongqing	Succeeded by Lan Yinong
Preceded by Cao Diqiu	Mayor of Chongqing	Succeeded by Lan Yinong
Preceded by Du Xinyuan	CPPCC Committee Chairman of Sichuan	Succeeded by Yang Chao
