= Duan Siying =

Chinese politician

Duan Siying

Duan Siying (Chinese: 段思英) (June 1917 – 25 December 2007) was a Chinese politician and People's Liberation Army major general. He was born in Yanchuan County, Yan'an, Shaanxi Province. He was Chinese Communist Party Committee Secretary and Mayor of Chongqing.
