= Lu Dadong =

- 鲁大东

Governor of Sichuan
- In office December 1979 – April 1983
- Preceded by: Zhao Ziyang
- Succeeded by: Yang Xizong

Personal details
- Born: 1915 Guantao County, Hebei, China
- Died: 28 August 1998 (aged 83) Chengdu, Sichuan, China
- Party: Chinese Communist Party

Lu Dadong (Chinese: 鲁大东; 1915 – 28 August 1998) was a communist revolutionary and politician of the People's Republic of China. He served as Communist Party Chief of Chongqing city and Governor of Sichuan province.

== Biography ==
Lu Dadong was a native of Guantao County, Hebei province. He joined the communist revolution in 1937 and the Chinese Communist Party (CCP) in 1938.

In 1943 Lu studied at the Central Party School of the CCP in Yan'an. He was a commander of the People's Liberation Army during the Chinese Civil War and participated in numerous battles, including the Battle of Chengdu in Sichuan.

After the establishment of the People's Republic of China in 1949, Lu Dadong was appointed Communist Party Chief of Leshan prefecture in Sichuan. He was later transferred to Chongqing (then under the administration of Sichuan).

As mayor of Chongqing during the Third Front campaign to develop basic industry and national defense industry in China's rugged interior, Lu was also appointed to direct the administrative body overseeing conventional weapons production industry around Chongqing.

Lu rose to the position of First Party Secretary (party chief) of Chongqing (April 1974 – November 1981) and deputy party chief of Sichuan. From December 1979 to April 1983 he served as Governor of Sichuan.

Lu disappeared from public life in September 1989. He died on 28 August 1998 in Chengdu.

Lu was an alternate member of the 9th and 10th Central Committee of the Chinese Communist Party, and a full member of the 11th and 12th Central Committees.

Political offices
| Preceded by Zhao Ziyang | Governor of Sichuan; 1979–1983 | Succeeded by Yang Xizong |
