= Chen Xilian =

Chinese general (1915–1999)

Chen Xilian 陈锡联
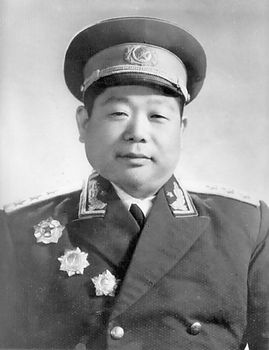
- Born: Chen Xilian; January 1, 1915; Hong'an County, Hubei, Republic of China
- Died: 10 June 1999 (aged 84); Beijing, China
- Spouses: Li Ge (m. 1942; died 1948) Wang Xuanmei (1949–1999)
- Children: 3 (two sons and one daughter)
- Military career
- Allegiance: China
- Branch: People's Liberation Army
- Rank: General
- Commands: 129th Division; Eighth Route Army; 385th Brigade; Shenyang Military Region; Beijing Military Region
- Conflicts: Chinese Civil War; Second Sino-Japanese War; Sino-Soviet border conflict
- Awards: Order of Bayi (First Class Medal); Order of Independence and Freedom (First Class Medal); Order of Liberation (First Class Medal)

Chen Xilian
- Simplified Chinese: 陈锡联
- Traditional Chinese: 陳錫聯
Transcriptions
Standard Mandarin
- Hanyu Pinyin: Chén Xīlián

Chen Xilian (Chinese: 陈锡联; pronounced [ʈʂʰə̌n ɕíljɛ̌n]; 4 January 1915 – 10 June 1999) was a Chinese military officer and politician, general of the People's Liberation Army. A prominent Maoist, he held very important positions in both military and political spheres.

Following acclaimed participation in many battles during both the Second Sino–Japanese War and the Chinese Civil War, Chen served as Mayor and Military Governor of Chongqing from 1949 to 1950 and Central Commander of PLA Artillery from 1950 to 1959. He then commanded the Shenyang Military Region (1959–73) and, crucially, the Beijing Military Region (1973–80). Additionally, Chen was a full member of the Politburo (1969–80) and Vice Premier (1975–80).

After Mao's death, Chen was one of Hua Guofeng's most significant supporters, along with Wang Dongxing and Li Xiannian. When Deng Xiaoping gradually rose to power, Chen lost his powerful posts, but was allowed to retire without harm.

== Early military career and Sino–Japanese War ==
Chen was born in Hong'an County, Hubei, in 1915. He became a soldier in the Chinese Red Army in 1929, at age 14, and joined the Communist Youth League a year later. Following military training at the Red Army School, he served in the 4th Front Army as a political instructor and communications man, moving up the ranks to regiment political commissar in 1934. His unit, which was led by Zhang Guotao, Xu Xiangqian and Li Xiannian, included such future leaders as Qin Jiwei. They fought Sichuan warlords on the western leg of the Long March. At the close of the Long March, Chen – like his colleagues Xu Shiyou and Yu Qiuli – would find himself on the wrong side of the Mao Zedong-Zhang Guotao dispute, and badly battered by Muslim Hui cavalry and warlord armies. After the fighting, Chen emerged as a division commander and reached Yan'an in late 1935. He was assigned to the 129th Division of Eighth Route Army, which later became the core of the 2nd Field Army led by Liu Bocheng and Deng Xiaoping.

On October 19, 1937 he led the 769th Regiment, First Column, against Japanese units defending Yangmingbao airbase, destroying 24 Japanese military aircraft, and killing more than 100 Japanese soldiers, which alleviated the air threat on the Xikou Front. Chen at this time served under Xu Xiangqian with future generals Xu Shiyou, Xu Haidong and Han Xianchu.

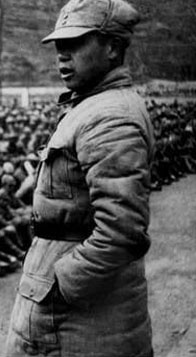
Chen Xilian addressing soldiers in 1940

In the summer of 1940, Chen's unit participated in the victorious Hundred Regiments Campaign near Taiyuan, and by September Chen had succeeded the reassigned Xu Shiyou as 385th Brigade Commander; his political commissar at the time was future Public Security Minister Xie Fuzhi, later to become another powerful leftist.

From 1943 to 1944, he studied at the Central Party School in Yan'an.

== Chinese Civil War ==
During the Chinese Civil War, Chen was commander of the 3rd Army and distinguished himself in the Huai–Hai and Yangtze campaigns, which were both crushing victories for the Communists. In the spring of 1949, after the fall of Nanjing, Chen's forces moved into Zhejiang, and took part in the capture of Hangzhou and Shanghai, and then of the Southwest.

== Early People's Republic ==
From 1949 to 1950, he was appointed Party First Secretary, Mayor and Military Governor of Chongqing, as well as a member of the Southwest Military and Political Committee, under the leadership of Deng Xiaoping, He Long and Liu Bocheng.

From 1950 to 1959, Chen served as Central Commander of the entire PLA Artillery, and President of the Artillery Academy. He worked very closely with Soviet advisers and, like the Soviet Red Army, the PLA would acquire a preference for heavy artillery bombardments. Chen especially distinguished himself during the First Taiwan Strait Crisis, with the PLA capturing the Yijiangshan and Dachen islands. As commander of the artillery, he employed the former Qing Dynasty Manchu imperial prince Zaitao, as a special adviser.

From 1959 to 1973, Chen Xilian was in Manchuria, serving as commander of the Shenyang Military Region. He was actively involved in the Sino–Soviet border conflict, commanding the artillery assault on Zhenbao Island.

A beneficiary of the Cultural Revolution, he became a full member of the Politburo in 1969, and Party Secretary of Liaoning Province in 1971.

== Height of power and subsequent fall ==
In December 1973, Chen Xilian became Commander of the Beijing Military Region, while remaining a full member of the Politburo. In 1975 he was also named a Vice Premier. During Mao Zedong's last years, Chen was one of his most trusted lieutenants, and Mao even allowed Chen to unofficially take over daily control of the Central Military Commission, something that offended Marshal Ye Jianying, who was previously tasked with this sensitive assignment.

In October 1976 (following the death of Mao in September) Chen was given credit by many for managing the arrest of the Gang of Four, but other sources instead give full credit to Wang Dongxing; in any case, the two were close allies, and both agreed in supporting Hua Guofeng, Mao's designated successor.

Chen was a proponent of developing a DF-61 tactical nuclear missile to counter the perceived threat from the Soviet Union. Begun in 1976, the program was cancelled in 1977, possibly possibly due to China's decision not to emphasize tactical weapons in its nuclear weapons program.

Hua Guofeng gradually saw power slip from his hands, and Deng Xiaoping's re-emergence spelled the end of Chen's military and political power. Chen was ousted from the Central Military Commission in 1978. He was forced into retirement in February 1980 along with three other beneficiaries of the Cultural Revolution: Wu De, Ji Dengkui and Wang Dongxing. Together they were labelled the "Little Gang of Four" by Deng and his followers. However due to Chen's status as a revered war hero, Deng did not disgrace him any further as he previously did with the Gang of Four, allowing him to retain all the privileges of a retired general and attend the military parade celebrating the 35th anniversary of the People's Republic of China with a VIP seat atop the Tiananmen gate on 1 October 1984.

Chen went on to enjoy a comfortable retirement, and died in Beijing in 1999, at the age of 84.

== See also ==
- List of officers of the People's Liberation Army

== Notes ==
Military offices
Preceded by Deng Hua	Shenyang Military Region Commander; 1959–1973	Succeeded by Li Desheng
Preceded by Li Desheng	Beijing Military Region Commander; 1974–1980	Succeeded by Qin Jiwei
