= Yan Hongyan =

People's Liberation Army general (1909 – 1967)

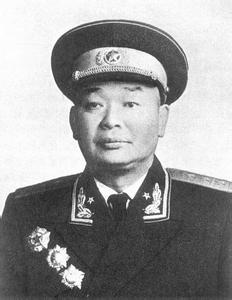
Yan Hongyan in military uniform, 1955

Yan Hongyan (Chinese: 阎红彦; pinyin: Yán Hóngyàn; 13 September 1909 – 8 January 1967) was a general of the People's Liberation Army of China.

Yan was born in Anding County, Shaanxi province in 1909. He joined the Chinese Communist Party in 1924. He participated in the North Expedition. Later he became the commander of the Red 30th Army. After the Second Sino-Japanese War, he was the vice political commissar and director of the political department of the third army group in the No. 2 Field Army.

After the formation of the People's Republic of China, he was the vice governor and vice secretary of CCP's committee in Sichuan Province. He was made a general in 1955. In August 1959, he became the No. 1 secretary of the CCP's committee in Yunnan Province, No.1 political commissar of Kunming Military Region, and secretary of secretariat in the Southwest bureau of CCP. In December 1963, he became the chairman of the Yunnan commission of Chinese People's Political Consultative Conference, and also an alternative member of the 8th CCP Central Committee. He ran afoul of the Maoist leadership in Beijing shortly after the beginning of the Cultural Revolution and committed suicide on 8 January 1967, one of the most senior so-called "capitalist roaders" to do so.

== See also ==
- List of officers of the People's Liberation Army
