= Tao Wuxian =

Chinese politician (born 1948)

Tao Wuxian (Chinese: 陶武先; pinyin: Táo Wǔxiān; born 1948) is a Chinese politician.

A native of Shehong County, Sichuan, Tao began his career in 1977 as the Chinese Communist Party Deputy Committee Secretary of the Communist Youth League Chengdu Municipal Committee. He later rose to Party Secretary, and then became a member of the standing committee of the CYL's Sichuan Provincial Committee.

In 1986, Tao became the deputy secretary-general of the Chengdu Party Committee. In 1996, he was appointed secretary-general of the Sichuan Provincial Party Committee. In 1997, Tao became a member of the standing committee of the Sichuan Provincial Party Committee and Party Committee Secretary of Chengdu.

In 2000, Tao was appointed deputy Party Committee Secretary of Sichuan. He became vice-chairman of the Sichuan Provincial Committee of the Chinese People's Political Consultative Conference in 2007, and was elevated to the role of chairman the following year.
