= Sichuan Provincial People's Congress =

Sichuan Provincial People's Congress 四川省人民代表大会
- 14th Sichuan Provincial People's Congress

Type
- Type: Province-level people's congress

Leadership
- Chairman of the Standing Committee: Wang Xiaohui, CCP since 15 January 2023

Elections
- Sichuan Provincial People's Congress voting system: Plurality-at-large voting & Two-round system

Sichuan Provincial People's Congress
- Simplified Chinese: 四川省人民代表大会
- Traditional Chinese: 四川省人民代表大會
Transcriptions
Standard Mandarin
- Hanyu Pinyin: Sìchuān Shěng Rénmín Dàibiǎo Dàhuì

The Sichuan Provincial People's Congress is the people's congress of Sichuan, a province of China. The Congress is elected for a term of five years. The Sichuan Provincial People's Congress meetings are held at least once a year. After a proposal by more than one-fifth of the deputies, a meeting of the people's congress at the corresponding level may be convened temporarily.

== History ==
The Standing Committee of the Sichuan Provincial People's Congress was launched in December 1979.

== Organization ==
=== Chairpersons of the Standing Committee ===
| Name | Took office | Left office | Ref. |
|---|---|---|---|
| Du Xinyuan | December 1979 | May 1985 | |
| He Haoju | May 1985 | February 1993 | |
| Yang Xizong | February 1993 | January 1998 | |
| Xie Shijie | January 1998 | January 2003 | |
| Zhang Xuezhong | January 2003 | January 2007 | |
| Du Qinglin | January 2007 | January 2008 | |
| Liu Qibao | January 2008 | January 2013 | |
| Wang Dongming | 29 January 2013 | 10 January 2019 | |
| Peng Qinghua | 19 January 2019 | 15 January 2023 | |
| Wang Xiaohui | 15 January 2023 | Incumbent | |

== See also ==
- System of people's congress
