= Politics of Sichuan =

The politics of Sichuan Province in the People's Republic of China is structured in a dual party-government system like all other governing institutions in mainland China.

The Governor of Sichuan is the highest-ranking official in the People's Government of Sichuan. However, in the province's dual party-government governing system, the Governor has less power than the Sichuan Chinese Communist Party (CCP) Provincial Committee Secretary, colloquially termed the "Sichuan CCP Party Chief".

== List of the CCP Sichuan Committee secretaries ==
No.	Image	Name	Term start	Term end	Ref.
1		Li Jingquan (1909–1989)	September 1952	February 1965	
2		Liao Zhigao (1913–2000)	February 1965	January 1967	
Cultural Revolution Interregnum			1967	1971	
3		Zhang Guohua (1914–1972)	August 1971	February 1972	
4		Liu Xingyuan (1908–1990)	March 1972	October 1975	
5		Zhao Ziyang (1919–2005)	October 1975	March 1980	
6		Tan Qilong (1913–2003)	March 1980	February 1983	
7		Yang Rudai (1926–2018)	February 1983	March 1993	
8		Xie Shijie (born 1934)	March 1993	January 2000	
9		Zhou Yongkang (born 1942)	6 January 2000	5 December 2002	
10		Zhang Xuezhong (born 1943)	5 December 2002	3 December 2006	
11		Du Qinglin (born 1946)	3 December 2006	2 December 2007	
12		Liu Qibao (born 1953)	2 December 2007	21 November 2012	
13		Wang Dongming (born 1956)	21 November 2012	21 March 2018	
14		Peng Qinghua (born 1957)	21 March 2018	22 April 2022	
15		Wang Xiaohui (born 1962)	22 April 2022	Incumbent	

== List of governors of Sichuan ==
1. Li Jingquan (李井泉): September 1952 – January 1955
2. Li Dazhang (李大章): January 1955 – 1966
3. Zhang Guohua (张国华): May 1968 – February 1972
4. Liu Xingyuan (刘兴元): March 1972 – October 1975
5. Zhao Ziyang: October 1975 – December 1979
6. Lu Dadong (鲁大东): December 1979 – April 1983
7. Yang Xizong (杨析综): December 1982 – May 1985
8. Jiang Minkuan (蒋民宽): May 1985 – January 1988
9. Zhang Haoruo (张皓若): January 1988 – February 1993
10. Xiao Yang (肖秧): February 1993 – February 1996
11. Song Baorui (宋宝瑞): February 1996 – June 1999
12. Zhang Zhongwei (张中伟): June 1999 – January 2007
13. Jiang Jufeng (蒋巨峰): January 2007 – January 2013
14. Wei Hong (魏宏): January 2013 – January 2016
15. Yin Li (尹力): January 2016 – December 2020
16. Huang Qiang (黄强): December 2020 – July 2024
17. Shi Xiaolin (施小琳): July 2024 – present

== List of chairmen of Sichuan People's Congress ==
1. Du Xinyuan (杜心源): 1979–1985
2. He Haoju (何郝炬): 1985–1993
3. Yang Xizong (杨析综): 1993–1998
4. Xie Shijie (谢世杰): 1998–2003
5. Zhang Xuezhong (张学忠): 2003–2007
6. Du Qinglin (杜青林): 2007
7. Liu Qibao: 2008–2013
8. Wang Dongming: 2013–2018
9. Peng Qinghua (彭清华): 2018–present
10. Wang Xiaohui (王晓晖): April 2022 – present

== List of the chairmen of CPPCC Sichuan Committee ==
1. Li Jingquan (李井泉): 1955–1965
2. Liao Zhigao (廖志高): 1965–1967
3. Du Xinyuan (杜心源): 1977–1979
4. Ren Baige (任白戈): 1979–1983
5. Yang Chao (杨超): 1983–1985
6. Feng Yuanwei (冯元蔚): 1985–1988
7. Liao Bokang (廖伯康): 1988–1993
8. Nie Ronggui (聂荣贵): 1993–2002
9. Qin Yuqin (秦玉琴): 2002–2008
10. Tao Wuxian (陶武先): 2008–2013
11. Li Chongxi: 2013–2014, removed from office for corruption
12. Ke Zunping (柯尊平): 2014–2022
13. Tian Xiangli (田向利): 2022–present
