= Standing Committee of the 14th National People's Congress =

Standing Committee of the 14th National People's Congress 第十四届全国人民代表大会 常务委员会
- National emblem of China

5 March 2023 (3 years, 58 days) – Overview
- Type: Supreme organ of state power
- Election: Indirect elections

Leadership
- Chairman: Zhao Leji
- Vice Chairmen: Li Hongzhong, Wang Dongming, Xiao Jie, Zheng Jianbang, Ding Zhongli, Hao Mingjin, Cai Dafeng, He Wei, Wu Weihua, Tie Ning, Peng Qinghua, Zhang Qingwei, Losang Jamcan, and Shohrat Zakir
- Secretary-General: Liu Qi

Members
- Total: 175 members

The Standing Committee of the 14th National People's Congress initially consisted of 175 members, including 16 members of the Council of Chairpersons (Chairman, Vice Chairmen, and Secretary-General) and 159 members. All members were elected by the first session of the 14th NPC. Their term of office is five years, starting from March 14, 2023, and is expected to last until March 2028.

== Members ==
=== Chairman ===
- Zhao Leji (Member of the Politburo Standing Committee of the Chinese Communist Party and Secretary of the Leading Party Group of the Standing Committee of the National People's Congress)

=== Vice Chairman ===
1. Li Hongzhong (Member of the Politburo of the Chinese Communist Party and Deputy Secretary of the Leading Party Group of the Standing Committee of the National People's Congress)
2. Wang Dongming (Member of the CCP Central Committee, Member of the Leading Party Group of the Standing Committee of the National People's Congress, Chairman of the All-China Federation of Trade Unions)
3. Xiao Jie (Member of the CCP Central Committee and Member of the Leading Party Group of the Standing Committee of the National People's Congress)
4. Zheng Jianbang (Chairman of the Central Committee of the Revolutionary Committee of the Chinese Kuomintang)
5. Ding Zhongli (Chairman of the Central Committee of the China Democratic League)
6. Hao Mingjin (Chairman of the China National Democratic Construction Association)
7. Cai Dafeng (Chairman of the Central Committee of the China Association for Promoting Democracy)
8. He Wei (Chairman of the Central Committee of the China National Democratic Construction Association)
9. Wu Weihua (Chairman of the Central Committee of the Jiusan Society, President of the Central Institute of Socialism)
10. Tie Ning (member of the CCP Central Committee, member of the Leading Party Group of the Standing Committee of the National People's Congress, and chairperson of the China Federation of Literary and Art Circles)
11. Peng Qinghua (Member of the Leading Party Group of the Standing Committee of the National People's Congress of the CCP)
12. Zhang Qingwei (Member of the CCP Central Committee and Member of the Leading Party Group of the Standing Committee of the National People's Congress)
13. Losang Jamcan (member of the Leading Party Group of the Standing Committee of the National People's Congress)
14. Shohrat Zakir (member of the Leading Party Group of the Standing Committee of the National People's Congress)

=== Secretary General ===
- Liu Qi (Member of the Leading Party Group of the Standing Committee of the National People's Congress and Secretary of the Leading Party Group of the Standing Committee of the National People's Congress)

The above-mentioned members are also members of the Chairman's Meeting of the Standing Committee of the National People's Congress.

=== Committee members (in order of stroke count of their surnames) ===
Ding Laihang (revoked on December 29, 2023), Yu Weiguo, Yu Zhongfu, Wan Lijun, Wei Xiaochun, Ma Liqun, Wang Ke, Wang Gang, Wang Hong (female, Manchu), Wang Zhimin, Wang Xiqin (terminated on October 28, 2025), Wang Xuecheng, Wang Baoshan, Wang Jianwu, Wang Hongxiang, Wang Chao, Wang Ruihe, Wang Yi, Wang Wei, Fang Xiang, Bayinchaolu (Mongolian), Bamoqubumo (female, Yi), Deng Xiuxin, Gu Xiaoyu, Bu Xiaolin (female, Mongolian), Ye Zanping, Shi Yaobin, Ran Bo (Miao), Bai Shangcheng (Hui), Cong Bin, Bao Xinhe, Lü Shiming, Lü Zhongmei (female), Lü Jian, Lü Caixia (female), Zhu Mingchun, Liu Cangli, Liu Xiuwen, Liu Junchen, Yan Aoshuang (female), Jiang Tianliang (Tujia), Jiang Jinquan, Tang Weijian, An Lijia, An Zhaoqing (Xibe), Xu Weigang, Xu Dazhe (revoked on October 28, 2025)), Xu Anbiao, Sun Qixin, Sun Xianzong, Sun Jusheng, Du Xiaoguang (Bai nationality), Du Jiahao, Li Ning, Li Jiheng, Li Yuefeng (removed on June 28, 2024), Li Jingze, Li Jinbin, Li Jinghai, Li Huiqiong (female), Li Yi, Li Wei, Yang Yongying (female, Buyi nationality), Yang Guanlin (Xibe nationality), Yang Zhenwu, Yang Xiaochao, Shu Wei (resigned on December 25, 2024), Xiao Keti Yiming (Uyghur nationality), Wu Yirong, Wu Lixin, Wu Jieming, Wu Jing (female), Wu Pute, Qiu Xueqiang, He Ping, He Xin, Gu Zhenchun, Wang Tiemin, Sharhat Ahan (Kazakh nationality), Shen Jinlong, Shen Jinqiang, Shen Chunyao, Shen Zhengchang, Song Xiuyan (female), Song Rui, Zhang Taifan(Korean nationality), Zhang Wei (female), Zhang Shougang, Zhang Xuan (female), Zhang Meizhi (female), Zhang Yong, Zhang Tao, Zhang Daohong, Zhang Jiaji, Chen Fuli, Wu Zeng (female) (resigned on June 27, 2025), Fu Caixiang (female, Li nationality), Fan Xiaojun, Lin Rui, Ouyang Changqiong, Luo Qi, Zhou Yaning (removed from office on December 29, 2023), Zhou Guangquan, Zhou Min (female), Pang Lijuan (female), Di Qingyun (female, Hui nationality), Zheng Weiping, Zheng Gongcheng, Zheng Junli (Yao nationality), Zheng Jianmin, Hao Ping, Hu Xiaoli, Zhong Shan, Zhong Zhihua, Duan Chunhua, Xin Chunying (female), Hou Jianguo, Lou Qinjian, Luo Yuan, Qin Shengxiang, Yuan Yubai, Yuan Shuhong, Xia Guang, Qian Qian, Xu Yushan (female, Dai nationality), Xu Yongjun, Xu Xiao, Xu Hui, Weng Jieming, Gao Kaixian, Gao Youdong, Gao Song, Guo Shuqing, Guo Zhenhua, Guo Lei, Tang Huajun, Huang Zhixian, Huang Ming, Huang Junhua (Zhuang nationality), Cao Hongming, E Jingping, Lu Xinshe, Peng Jinhui (Yi nationality), Jiang Zhuoqing, Jiang Chaoliang (revoked on April 30, 2025) Jing Hanchao, Cheng Lin, Cheng Jing, Cheng Xueyuan, Fu Ziying, Xie Jingrong, Zhen Zhanmin, Jamyang Losang Jigme Thubten Chokyi Nyima (Tibetan), He Jie, Xian Tieke, Luo Shugang, Tan Tianxing, Tan Lin (female), Yan Ke (female)

== List of meetings ==
Meeting	Date	Agenda	Ref.
	March 5, 2023 – March 13, 2023	First session of the 14th National People's Congress	
	March 5, 2023 – March 13, 2023	The government work report was adopted, along with resolutions on the implementation of the 2022 national economic and social development plan and the 2023 national economic and social development plan, as well as resolutions on the implementation of the 2022 central and local budgets and the 2023 central and local budgets. A decision to amend the Legislation Law was also adopted. The work reports of the Standing Committee of the National People's Congress, the Supreme People's Court, and the Supreme People's Procuratorate were adopted. The reform plan for the State Council's institutions was adopted. Members of state institutions were elected, and the list of staff members of the National People's Congress and the candidates for members of state institutions were voted on	
1st	March 14, 2023	Appointment of Deputy Secretary-General of the Standing Committee of the National People's Congress	
2nd	April 24, 2023 – April 26, 2023	At the meeting: the revised Qinghai-Tibet Plateau Ecological Protection Law was adopted; the revised Counter-Espionage Law was adopted; the Code of Conduct for Members of the Standing Committee of the National People's Congress was adopted; the list of the Chairman, Vice-Chairmen, and Members of the Credentials Committee of the 14th National People's Congress Standing Committee was adopted; and relevant appointment and removal cases were adopted.; Deliberation on the draft law on the construction of an accessible environment	
3rd	June 26, 2023 – June 28, 2023	At the meeting, the Standing Committee of the National People's Congress: passed the Law on the Construction of Barrier-Free Environment and the Law on Foreign Relations; decided to establish the Working Committee for Deputies of the Standing Committee of the National People's Congress; decided to establish the National Ecological Day; approved the Ninth Additional Protocol to the Constitution of the Universal Postal Union and the Supplementary Protocol to the Convention on the Suppression of Unlawful Hijacking of Aircraft; approved the 2022 Central Government Final Accounts; and; passed relevant appointment and removal cases.; The draft laws on patriotic education and food security were reviewed, as well as the draft revisions to the Administrative Reconsideration Law and the Marine Environmental Protection Law.	
4th	July 25, 2023	The appointment and removal of the Minister of Foreign Affairs and the Governor of the People's Bank of China were approved. Deliberation on the draft amendment to the Criminal Law (XII)	
5th	August 28, 2023 – September 1, 2023	At the meeting: the Foreign State Immunities Law was adopted; the Decision on Amending the Civil Procedure Law was adopted; the Administrative Reconsideration Law was revised; the authorization for the State Council to conduct pilot programs in the nine mainland cities of the Guangdong-Hong Kong-Macao Greater Bay Area for Hong Kong legal practitioners and Macao lawyers to obtain mainland practice qualifications and engage in the legal profession was extended; the extradition treaty with Ecuador was approved; and; relevant appointment and removal cases were adopted.; The draft Value-Added Tax Law, the Preschool Education Law, and the Degree Law will be reviewed; the draft revisions to the Company Law and the Law on Penalties for Administration of Public Security will also be reviewed.	
6th	October 20, 2023 – October 24, 2023	The National People 's Congress adopted the revised Patriotic Education Law, the Marine Environmental Protection Law, removed the State Councilor and Minister of National Defense, and appointed and removed the Minister of Science and Technology and the Minister of Finance. It also approved the State Council's plan to increase the issuance of national debt and adjust the 2023 central budget, authorized the State a newly added local government debt limit in advance, approved treaty on the transfer of sentenced persons, approved the extradition treaty with Mauritius, approved the Supplementary Protocol to the United Nations Convention against Transnational Organized Crime on Combating the Illicit Manufacturing and Trafficking of Firearms, Firearms and Firearms Parts and Ammunition, approved the Convention on Privileges and Immunities of the Secretariat of the Conference on Interaction and Confidence Building Measures in Asia and its Personnel and Representatives of Member States, and decided to accede to the Convention on International Lighthouse Authorities. The NPC also adopted reports from the Supervisory and Judicial Committee, the Financial and Economic Committee, the Environmental and Resources Protection Committee, and the Social Construction Committee on the results of the deliberations on the motions submitted by deputies to the Presidium of the First Session of the 14th NPC. Members of the Central Military Commission were removed Other appointments and removals were also approved. The draft laws on food security, charity, state secrets, infectious disease prevention and control, customs, and cultural relics protection were reviewed.	
7th	December 25, 2023 – December 29, 2023	The National People's Congress passed the Food Security Law, the Amendment to the Criminal Law (XII), and the Decision on Amending the Charity Law. It also revised and passed the Company Law The Minister of National Defense was appointed, and the Ministers of Civil Affairs and Culture and Tourism were appointed and removed The Standing Committee of the National People's Congress passed the Decision on Convening the Second Session of the 14th National People's Congress, deciding that the Second Session of the 14th National People's Congress would be held on March 5, 2024. The Standing Committee approved the Extradition Treaty between the People's Republic of China and the Republic of Botswana and the Treaty between the People's Republic of China and the Republic of Senegal on Mutual Legal Assistance in Criminal Matters. The Standing Committee of the National People's Congress passed reports on the results of the deliberations of the motions submitted by deputies to the Presidium of the First Session of the 14th National People's Congress, submitted by the Ethnic Affairs Committee, the Constitution and Law Committee, the Education, Science, Culture and Health Committee, the Overseas Chinese Affairs Committee, and the Agriculture and Rural Affairs Committee. Other appointments and removals were also approved. The draft revisions to the State Council Organization Law, the draft Emergency Response Management Law, and the draft Rural Collective Economic Organization Law were reviewed. The draft amendments to the Supervision Law, the draft revisions to the Frontier Health and Quarantine Law, and the draft revisions to the Mineral Resources Law were also reviewed.	
8th	February 26, 2024 – February 27, 2024	The revised Law on Guarding State Secrets was adopted; the draft work report of the Standing Committee of the National People's Congress was adopted; the report of the Credentials Committee of the Standing Committee of the National People's Congress on the qualifications of individual deputies was adopted; the draft agenda, draft list of the Presidium and Secretary-General of the Second Session of the 14th National People's Congress was adopted; the list of attendees of the Second Session of the 14th National People's Congress was adopted; and other appointment and removal cases were adopted.	
	March 5, 2024 – March 11, 2024	The Second Session of the 14th National People's Congress	
	March 5, 2024 – March 11, 2024	The government work report adopted the resolutions on the implementation of the 2023 national economic and social development plan and the 2024 national economic and social development plan, and the resolutions on the implementation of the 2023 central and local budgets and the 2024 central and local budgets. The revised State Council Organization Law was also adopted The work reports of the Standing Committee of the National People's Congress, the Supreme People's Court, and the Supreme People's Procuratorate were also adopted.	
9th	April 23, 2024 – April 26, 2024	The Standing Committee of the National People's Congress passed the Degree Law, the Customs Law, and the Decision on Amending the Agricultural Technology Extension Law, the Law on the Protection of Minors, and the Biosecurity Law. It also approved the Treaty between the People's Republic of China and the Republic of Mauritius on Mutual Legal Assistance in Criminal Matters, the Treaty between the People's Republic of China and Nepal on Mutual Legal Assistance in Criminal Matters, the Extradition Treaty between the People's Republic of China and the Republic of Senegal, and the Extradition Treaty between the People's Republic of China and the Hellenic Republic. The Standing Committee also passed the report of the Credentials Committee of the Standing Committee on the qualifications of individual deputies and other appointment and removal cases. The draft revisions to the National Defense Education Law, the Accounting Law, the Statistics Law, the Energy Law, the Atomic Energy Law, and the Anti-Money Laundering Law were reviewed. The draft decision authorizing the State Council to temporarily adjust the application of relevant provisions of the Food Safety Law in the Hainan Free Trade Port was also reviewed.	
10th	June 25, 2024 – June 28, 2024	The National People's Congress Standing Committee adopted the Rural Collective Economic Organization Law and the Decision on Amending the Accounting Law. It also revised and adopted the Emergency Response Law and the Frontier Health and Quarantine Law The Committee appointed and removed the Director of the National Health Commission. It authorized the State Council to temporarily adjust the application of relevant provisions of the Food Safety Law in the Hainan Free Trade Port. It approved the Amendment of Annex A to the Minamata Convention on Mercury by Decision No. 4/3 of the Fourth Session of the Conference of the Parties to the Minamata Convention on Mercury, and approved the Extradition Treaty between the People's Republic of China and the Republic of Panama. It approved the 2023 Central Government Final Accounts. The Committee also approved the Report of the Credentials Committee of the Standing Committee of the National People's Congress on the Qualifications of Individual Deputies. Other appointments and removals were also approved. The draft Financial Stability Law, the draft Preschool Education Law, the draft revision of the Public Security Administration Punishment Law, the draft revision of the Cultural Relics Protection Law, and the draft revision of the Mineral Resources Law were reviewed.	
11th	September 10, 2024 – September 13, 2024	The following decisions were adopted: Decision on Amending the Statistics Law; Revision of the National Defense Education Law Appointment and Removal of the Minister of Agriculture and Rural Affairs; Decision to Confer National Medals and National Honorary Titles on the 75th Anniversary of the Founding of the People's Republic of China; Decision to Implement a Gradual Delay in the Statutory Retirement Age; Approval of the Protocol on Amending the Treaty between the People's Republic of China and the Republic of Kazakhstan on Mutual Legal Assistance in Civil and Criminal Matters (signed January 14, 1993); Approval of the Treaty between the People's Republic of China and the Eastern Republic of Uruguay on Mutual Legal Assistance in Criminal Matters; Approval of the Treaty between the People's Republic of China and the Socialist Republic of Vietnam on the Transfer of Sentenced Persons; Adoption of the Report of the Credentials Committee of the Standing Committee of the National People's Congress on the Qualifications of Individual Deputies; Approval of the List of Members of the Election Committee of the Chinese People's Liberation Army by the Standing Committee of the National People's Congress; and Adoption of Other Appointments and Removals. The draft amendments to the Law on Prevention and Control of Infectious Diseases, the draft Energy Law, and the draft Anti-Money Laundering Law were reviewed. The draft Law on Responding to Public Health Emergencies, the draft National Parks Law, and the draft amendment to the Supervision Law were also reviewed.	
12th	November 4, 2024 – November 8, 2024	The following laws were amended: the Preschool Education Law, the Energy Law, and the Decision on Amending the Supervision Law the Cultural Relics Protection Law, the Mineral Resources Law, and the Anti-Money Laundering Law; the Minister of Transport was appointed and removed; the authorization to the State Council to temporarily adjust the application of relevant provisions of the Measurement Law in pilot cities for business environment innovation was extended; the State Council's proposal to increase the local government debt limit and replace existing hidden debt was approved; the Amendment to the 1996 Protocol to the Convention for the Prevention of Pollution of the Marine by Dumping of Waste and Other Substances was approved; the reports on the results of the deliberations of the motions submitted by deputies to the Presidium of the Second Session of the 14th National People's Congress by the Supervisory and Judicial Committee, the Environment and Resources Protection Committee, the Agriculture and Rural Affairs Committee, and the Social Construction Committee of the National People's Congress were adopted; the report of the Credentials Committee of the Standing Committee of the National People's Congress on the qualifications of individual deputies was adopted; and other appointments and removals were approved. Deliberations on draft amendments to the Law on Deputies to the National People's Congress and the Arbitration Law, the Maritime Law, and the Law on Popularization of Science and Technology	
13th	December 21, 2024 – December 25, 2024	The National People's Congress (NPC) adopted the Value-Added Tax Law and the Decision on Amending the Supervision Law. It also revised and adopted the Law on Popularization of Science and Technology The NPC appointed and removed the Minister of Natural Resources The NPC Standing Committee adopted the Decision on Convening the Third Session of the 14th NPC, deciding that the Third Session of the 14th NPC will be held on March 5, 2025. It also approved the Extradition Treaty between the People's Republic of China and the Republic of Zimbabwe and the Extradition Treaty between the People's Republic of China and the Republic of Suriname. Furthermore, it adopted the reports submitted by the NPC Ethnic Affairs Committee, the Constitution and Law Committee, the Finance and Economic Committee, the Education, Science, Culture and Health Committee, and the Overseas Chinese Affairs Committee on the results of the deliberations on the motions submitted by deputies to the Presidium of the Second Session of the 14th NPC. The NPC Standing Committee's Credentials Committee reported on the qualifications of individual deputies. It approved the list of members of the Sixth NPC Standing Committee's Basic Law Committee for the Macao Special Administrative Region. It accepted Shu Wei's request to resign from his positions as a member of the 14th NPC Standing Committee. Other appointments and removals were also approved. The draft amendments to the Law on Deputies to the National People's Congress and the National Parks Law will be reviewed. The draft laws on legal publicity and education, the draft law on promoting the private economy, the draft amendments to the Anti-Unfair Competition Law, the draft amendments to the Fisheries Law, and the draft law on the safety of hazardous chemicals will also be reviewed.	
14th	February 24, 2025 – February 25, 2025	The Standing Committee of the National People's Congress (NPC) adopted in principle the draft work report of its Standing Committee; the report of the Credentials Committee of the NPC Standing Committee on the qualifications of individual deputies; the draft agenda of the Third Session of the 14th NPC, the draft list of the Presidium and Secretary-General ; the list of attendees at the Third Session of the 14th NPC; and other appointment and removal decisions. Deliberation on the draft law on promoting the private economy and the draft revision of the civil aviation law	
	March 5, 2025 – March 11, 2025	The Third Session of the 14th National People's Congress	
	March 5, 2025 – March 11, 2025	The government work report adopted the resolutions on the implementation of the 2024 national economic and social development plan and the 2025 national economic and social development plan, the resolutions on the implementation of the 2024 central and local budgets and the 2025 central and local budgets, and the decision to amend the Law on Deputies to the National People's Congress The work reports of the Standing Committee of the National People's Congress, the Supreme People's Court, and the Supreme People's Procuratorate were also adopted.	
15th	April 27, 2025 – April 30, 2025	The National People's Congress Standing Committee passed the revision of the Law on the Promotion of Private Economy, the Law on the Prevention and Control of Infectious Diseases, appointed and removed the Minister of Industry and Information Technology, authorized the State Council to temporarily adjust the application of relevant provisions of the Seed Law in the China (Xinjiang) Pilot Free Trade Zone, approved the Agreement between the People's Republic of China and the Kingdom of Saudi Arabia on Civil and Commercial Judicial Assistance and Cooperation, approved the Treaty between the People's Republic of China and the Federal Democratic Republic of Ethiopia on the Transfer of Sentenced Persons, passed the report of the Credentials Committee of the Standing Committee of the National People's Congress on the qualifications of individual deputies, and passed other appointment and removal cases. The draft Atomic Energy Law, the draft amendment to the Arbitration Law, the draft Ecological and Environmental Code, the draft National Development Planning Law, and the draft amendment to the Prison Law were reviewed.	
16th	June 24, 2025 – June 27, 2025	Revised and passed the Law on Penalties for Administration of Public Security and the Anti-Unfair Competition Law; decided to approve the Convention on the Establishment of an International Court of Mediation; approved the 2024 Central Government Final Accounts; approved the report of the Credentials Committee of the Standing Committee of the National People's Congress on the qualifications of individual deputies; removed members of the Central Military Commission ; decided to accept Wu Zeng's request to resign from his position as a member of the 14th Standing Committee of the National People's Congress and passed other appointment and removal cases. The draft laws on responding to public health emergencies, the draft revision of the Maritime Law, the draft law on legal publicity and education, the draft revision of the Fisheries Law, and the draft revision of the Civil Aviation Law will be reviewed. The draft amendments to the Organic Law of Villagers' Committees, the Organic Law of Urban Residents' Committees, the draft Social Assistance Law, the draft Medical Security Law, and the draft amendment to the Food Safety Law will also be reviewed.	
17th	September 8, 2025 – September 12, 2025	The National People's Congress Standing Committee adopted the Atomic Energy Law, the Law on Responding to Public Health Emergencies, the National Park Law, the Law on Legal Publicity and Education, and the Decision on Amending the Food Safety Law. It also revised and adopted the Arbitration Law. The Committee appointed and removed the Director of the State Ethnic Affairs Commission. It approved the Treaty between Republic of Republic of Serbia in Civil and Commercial Matters and the Extradition Treaty between the People's Republic of China and the Republic of Serbia. The Committee also adopted the report of the Credentials Committee of the Standing Committee of the National People's Congress on the qualifications of individual deputies and other appointment and removal cases. The draft laws on the safety of hazardous chemicals, the general provisions of the ecological environment code, the ecological protection section of the ecological environment code, the green and low-carbon development section of the ecological environment code, the national development planning law, and the draft revision of the prison law will be reviewed. The draft amendments to the cybersecurity law, the law on promoting national unity and progress, the draft revision of the enterprise bankruptcy law, the draft revision of the law on the standard spoken and written Chinese language, and the draft revision of the foreign trade law will also be reviewed.	
18th	October 24, 2025 – October 28, 2025	The National People's Congress (NPC) adopted the decisions on amending the Organic Law of Villagers' Committees, the Cybersecurity Law, and the Environmental Protection Tax Law. It also revised and adopted the Maritime Law and the Organic Law of Urban Residents' Committees. The NPC appointed and removed the Vice Chairmen of the Central Military Commission. It a Taiwan Retrocession Day also on the Conservation and Sustainable Use of Marine Biodiversity in Areas Beyond State Jurisdiction under the United Nations Convention on the Law of the Sea (UNCLOS), the NPC approved Decision 5/4 of the Fifth Session of the Conference of the Parties to the Minamata Convention on Mercury (Amendments to Annexes A and B of the Convention on Mercury), the NPC approved the Treaty between the People's Republic of China and the Republic of Zimbabwe on Mutual Legal Assistance in Criminal Matters, and the NPC approved the Treaty between the People's Republic of China and the Federal Democratic Republic of Ethiopia on Mutual Legal Assistance in Criminal Matters. The NPC also adopted reports from the Supervisory and Judicial Committee, the Financial and Economic Committee, the Overseas Chinese Committee, the Environment and Resources Protection Committee, and the Social Construction Committee on the results of the deliberations on the motions submitted by deputies to the Presidium of the Third Session of the 14th NPC. The NPC Standing Committee's Credentials Committee reported on the qualifications of individual deputies. Other appointments and removals were also approved. The draft of the Pollution Prevention and Control Chapter of the Ecological and Environmental Code, the draft of the Legal Liability and Supplementary Provisions Chapter of the Ecological and Environmental Code, and the draft Law on Public Interest Litigation by Procuratorates and the draft Law on Farmland Protection and Quality Improvement were reviewed.	
19th	December 22, 2025 – December 27, 2025		
