= Sichuan Provincial Committee of the Chinese Communist Party =

Sichuan Provincial Committee of the Chinese Communist Party 中国共产党四川省委员会

Overview
- Type: Highest decision-making organ when Sichuan Provincial Congress is not in session.
- Elected by: Sichuan Provincial Congress
- Length of term: Five years
- Term limits: None
- First convocation: 1948

Leadership
- Secretary: Wang Xiaohui
- Deputy Secretary: Huang Qiang (Governor); Shi Xiaolin (Full-time Deputy Secretary)
- Secretary-General: Chen Wei
- Executive organ: Standing Committee
- Inspection organ: Commission for Discipline Inspection

Sichuan Provincial Committee of the Chinese Communist Party
- Simplified Chinese: 中国共产党四川省委员会
- Traditional Chinese: 中國共產黨四川省委員會
Transcriptions
Standard Mandarin
- Hanyu Pinyin: Zhōngguó Gòngchǎndǎng Sìchuānshěng Wěiyuánhuì

Abbreviation
- Chinese: 中共四川省委
- Literal meaning: CCP Sichuan Provincial Committee
Transcriptions
Standard Mandarin
- Hanyu Pinyin: Zhōnggòng Sìchuānshěng Wěi

The Sichuan Provincial Committee of the Chinese Communist Party is the provincial committee of the Chinese Communist Party (CCP) in Sichuan. The CCP committee secretary is the highest ranking post in the province. The current secretary is Wang Xiaohui, who succeeded Peng Qinghua on 22 April 2022.

== History ==
In 2020, Sichuan Daily and the Sichuan Provincial Committee of the CCP jointly formed an international communication center.

== Organization ==
The organization of the Sichuan Provincial Committee includes:

- General Office

=== Functional Departments ===
- Organization Department
- Publicity Department
- United Front Work Department
- Political and Legal Affairs Commission
- Social Work Department

=== Offices ===
- Policy Research Office
- Office of the Cyberspace Affairs Commission
- Office of the Foreign Affairs Commission
- Office of the Institutional Organization Commission
- Office of the Military-civilian Fusion Development Committee
- Taiwan Work Office
- Office of the Leading Group for Inspection Work
- Bureau of Veteran Cadres

=== Dispatched institutions ===
- Working Committee of the Organs Directly Affiliated to the Sichuan Provincial Committee

=== Organizations directly under the Committee ===
- Sichuan Party School
- Sichuan Institute of Socialism
- Sichuan Daily
- Party History Research Office
- Sichuan Provincial Archives

== Leadership ==
=== Provincial CCP Committees ===
11th Provincial Party Committee (May 2017 – May 2022)

- Secretary: Wang Dongming (until 21 March 2018), Peng Qinghua (21 March 2018 – 22 April 2022), Wang Xiaohui (from 22 April 2022)
- Deputy Secretaries: Yin Li (until December 2020), Deng Xiaogang (until October 2021), Huang Qiang (from December 2020)
- Standing Committee members: Wang Dongming (until March 2018), Yin Li (until December 2020), Deng Xiaogang (until October 2021), Wang Yanfei (until November 2021), Fan Ruiping (until August 2021), Wang Ning (until March 2020), Qumushiha (until February 2021), Gan Lin (until May 2022), Deng Yong, Huang Jianfa (until July 2018), Wang Minghui (until March 2020), Li Jing (until December 2017), Tian Xiangli (December 2017–December 2021), Jiang Yongshen (January 2018–April 2020), Peng Qinghua (March 2018–April 2022), Wang Zhengpu (August 2018–January 2021), Luo Wen (from March 2020), Wang Yihong (March 2020–September 2021), Qu Xinyong (March 2020–August 2021), Huang Qiang (from December 2020), Yu Lijun (from February 2021), Li Yunze (from May 2021), Shi Xiaolin (from August 2021), Tian Xiaowei (from August 2021), Luo Zengbin (September 2021–January 2022), Liao Jianyu (from November 2021), Cao Lijun (from March 2022), Zhao Junmin (from March 2022), Wang Xiaohui (from April 2022)

12th Provincial Party Committee (May 2022–)

- Secretary: Wang Xiaohui
- Deputy Secretaries: Huang Qiang, Luo Wen (until April 2022), Shi Xiaolin (from July 2023)
- Standing Committee members: Wang Xiaohui, Huang Qiang, Luo Wen (until April 2022), Liao Jianyu, Shi Xiaolin, Yu Lijun, Li Yunze (until May 2023), Tian Xiaowei, Cao Lijun, Chen Wei, Zhao Junmin, Jin Lei, Zheng Li, Dong Weimin (from August 2023), Purpu Tonchup (from October 2023)
