= Yang Rudai =

Chinese politician (1926–2018)

- 杨汝岱

Party Secretary of Sichuan
- In office February 1983 – April 1993
- Preceded by: Tan Qilong
- Succeeded by: Xie Shijie

Member of the 13th Politburo of the Chinese Communist Party
- In office November 1987 – October 1992
- General Secretary: Zhao Ziyang; Jiang Zemin

Personal details
- Born: December 1926 Renshou County, Sichuan, China
- Died: February 24, 2018 (aged 91) Beijing, China
- Party: Chinese Communist Party
- Spouse: Tan Xiaoying (谭小英)

Chinese name
- Traditional Chinese: 楊汝岱
- Simplified Chinese: 杨汝岱
Transcriptions
Standard Mandarin
- Hanyu Pinyin: Yáng Rǔdài
- Wade–Giles: Yang Ju-tai

Yang Rudai (Chinese: 杨汝岱; Wade–Giles: Yang Ju-tai; December 1926 – 24 February 2018) was a politician of the People's Republic of China (PRC). He served as the Party Secretary of Sichuan, then China's most populous province, and was the first native Sichuanese to become the top leader of the province since the founding of the PRC. He was a member of the 13th Politburo of the Chinese Communist Party, the top governing body of China. Yang was considered a protégé of the purged reformist leader Zhao Ziyang.

== Early life and career ==
Yang Rudai was born in December 1926 in Renshou County, Sichuan province. He received the equivalent of a high school-level education at Ren Shou No.1 Middle School.

In the early 1950s Yang actively participated in the land reform that was carried out by the newly established People's Republic of China and was rewarded for his performance. He joined the Chinese Communist Party in 1952, and was promoted just two years later to Deputy Party Chief of Renshou County. During the political radicalization of the 1960s, Yang's humble family background made him a model of the "class line" of the Sichuan provincial chief Li Jingquan, and he was promoted to First Party Secretary of Renshou. However, he subsequently was persecuted due to this tie to Li Jingquan when Li fell from power during the Cultural Revolution.

== Rise to prominence ==
Despite his suffering during the Cultural Revolution, Yang worked hard and took a leadership role in the building of a major reservoir which solved a key irrigation problem. Zhao Ziyang, the new reformist Party Chief of Sichuan, was impressed by his performance and promoted him first to Party Chief of Leshan prefecture in 1977, and only a year later, to Vice Governor of Sichuan province. Yang became a close assistant of Zhao Ziyang.

When Zhao Ziyang left Sichuan to become the Premier of China in 1980, Yang was favoured to succeed him as the provincial chief. However, Tan Qilong, a senior revolutionary leader, was chosen instead to replace Zhao as a transitional leader to "assist" the relatively young Yang Rudai. Yang became one of the several party secretaries of Sichuan under Tan, but he took charge of the daily operation of the province.

Two years later, Tan Qilong retired from politics along with most senior leaders of the revolutionary generation, and Yang Rudai succeeded him to become the first Sichuan native to serve as its top provincial leader. He was also elected to the 12th Central Committee of the Chinese Communist Party in 1982. In 1987 he rose further to become a member of the 13th Politburo, one of China's top decision-making bodies, which was headed by Yang's old boss Zhao Ziyang as General Secretary.

== Conflicts ==
A man from the countryside with limited education, Yang was a cautious leader who avoided making mistakes or forming political factions. His carefulness attracted criticism that Sichuan did not achieve any breakthrough in reform under his leadership. He clashed with Governor Jiang Minkuan, who made reform proposals that were deemed "unrealistic" by Zhao Ziyang. The tension resulted in Jiang's transfer away from Sichuan.

Jiang was replaced as governor by Zhang Haoruo in 1988, who came from a "princeling" background and enjoyed a close relationship with Premier Li Peng. Yang and Zhang had serious conflicts during the Tiananmen Square protests of 1989. Yang urged the central government to handle the protests peacefully, while Zhang supported the hardline advocated by Li Peng and others. After the imposition of martial law by the central government, Yang changed his position and adopted a harsh policy toward student protesters in Sichuan. Severe conflicts broke out after the arrest of many demonstrators, and the largest shopping center in the provincial capital Chengdu was burned down.

In the aftermath of the Tiananmen Square protests, Zhao Ziyang was purged and placed under house arrest in 1989. Yang, considered a protégé of Zhao, kept his Politburo membership until his term ended. However, he was not reelected into the 14th Politburo in 1992 despite not having reached the retirement age.

== Three Gorges Dam ==
In early 1992, the National People's Congress passed a resolution to build the Three Gorges Dam, the world's biggest. It was projected that at the completion of the dam, Sichuan would lose 503 square kilometres (194 sq mi) of land, and nearly a million people would need to be relocated. Yang Rudai was opposed to the dam and supported Sichuanese deputies who strongly protested the decision at the National Congress. In contrast, Governor Zhang Haoruo resolutely supported the national government's decision. Under strong pressure from Beijing, Yang changed his position and agreed to support the project. In compensation, he negotiated an increase of the central government's investment in Sichuan by 18.5 billion yuan. When the deal was reached, Governor Zhang expressed his support on behalf of Sichuan at a press conference, while Yang remained silent.

== After Sichuan ==
In 1993 Yang was replaced by Xie Shijie as Sichuan party chief, and was transferred to the national level to serve as a Vice Chairman of the Chinese People's Political Consultative Conference (CPPCC), a largely ceremonial but prestigious post. He served two terms in that position until 2003.

In July 2010 Yang published a memoir in the liberal Chinese magazine Yanhuang Chunqiu praising Zhao Ziyang. It marked a rare break of the long-standing taboo in China against mentioning the former leader since he was ousted after the Tiananmen protests.

== Personal life ==
Yang was said to lead a simple private life. At least until 1988, after he became the Party Chief of Sichuan and a Politburo member, his wife Tan Xiaoying (谭小英) was still a contract worker in a small street factory in Chengdu.

== Death ==
On 24 February 2018, Yang died in Beijing at the age of 91 (92 in East Asian age reckoning). He was extolled by the Chinese government as "an excellent member of the Communist Party of China, a time-tested and loyal communist soldier, and an outstanding leader in agriculture and the economic development of the country".

== Career timeline ==
Date	Position
1993–2003	Vice-Chairman of the 8th and 9th Chinese People's Political Consultative Conference
1993–1998	Member of the 8th National People's Congress
1987–1992	Member of the 13th Central Committee of the Chinese Communist Party, elected to its politburo
1982–1987	Member of the 12th Central Committee of the Chinese Communist Party
1983–1993	Party Secretary of Sichuan
1978–1982	Vice Governor of Sichuan
1978–1982	Member of the CPC Sichuan Provincial and Standing Committees
1977–1978	Party Secretary of Leshan
1975–1978	Member of the 4th National People's Congress
1952–1968	Party Secretary of Renshou

Party political offices
Preceded by Tan Qilong	Party Secretary of Sichuan; 1983–1993	Succeeded by Xie Shijie
