= 13th Politburo =

13th Politburo may refer to:

- 13th Politburo of the Chinese Communist Party
- Politburo of the 13th Congress of the All-Union Communist Party (Bolsheviks)
- 13th Politburo of the Communist Party of Czechoslovakia
- 13th Politburo of the Romanian Communist Party
- 13th Politburo of the Communist Party of Czechoslovakia
- 13th Politburo of the Communist Party of Vietnam
- 13th Politburo of the League of Communists of Yugoslavia
- 13th Politburo of the Hungarian Socialist Workers' Party
