= 13th Politburo of the Chinese Communist Party =

Chinese Communist Party

The 13th Politburo of the Chinese Communist Party (CCP), formally the Political Bureau of the 13th Central Committee of the Communist Party of China, was elected at the 1st plenary session of the 13th Central Committee of the CCP on 2 November 1987 in the aftermath of the 13th National Congress. This electoral term was preceded by the 12th Politburo and succeeded by the 14th. Eighth of the 17 members served concurrently in the 13th Politburo Standing Committee.

== Composition ==
=== Members ===
Members of the Political Bureau of the 13th Central Committee of the Chinese Communist Party
Officeholder		12th	14th	Birth	PM	Death	Birthplace	Offices held	Ref.
Hu Qili	胡启立	Old	Removed	1929	1948	Alive	Shaanxi	One: Party office; First-ranked Secretary, Secretariat of the Central Committee	
Hu Yaobang	胡耀邦	Old	Died	1915	1933	1989	Hunan	None: Held no political office other than Politburo and Central Committee membership.	
Jiang Zemin	江泽民	New	Elected	1926	1946	2022	Jiangsu	Four: Party offices; General Secretary, Central Committee; Head, Central Leading Group for Taiwan Affairs of the Central Committee; Head, Central Leading Group for Financial and Economic Work of the Central Committee; Military office; Chairman, Central Military Commission	
Li Peng	李鹏	Old	Elected	1928	1945	2019	Shanghai	One: State office; Premier of the People's Republic of China	
Li Ruihuan	李瑞环	New	Elected	1934	1959	Alive	Tianjin	One: Party office; Leader, Central Leading Group for Propaganda, Ideology and Culture of the Central Committee	
Li Tieying	李铁映	New	Elected	1936	1955	Alive	Shaanxi	Two: State offices; Chairman, State Commission for Restructuring Economy of the State Council; Chairman, State Education Commission of the State Council	
Li Ximing	李錫銘	New	Not	1926	1948	2008	Shandong	One: Party office; Secretary, Beijing Municipal Committee	
Qiao Shi	乔石	Old	Elected	1924	1940	2015	Shanghai	Two: Party offices; Secretary, Standing Committee of the Central Commission for Discipline Inspection; Secretary, Central Political and Legal Affairs Commission of the Central Committee	
Qin Jiwei	秦基偉	Alternate	Not	1914	1930	1997	Hubei	One: State office; Minister of National Defense	
Song Ping	宋平	New	Not	1917	1937	2026	Hong Kong	One: Party office; Head, Organisation Department of the Central Committee	
Tian Jiyun	田纪云	Old	Elected	1929	1945	Alive	Shandong	One: State office; Vice Premier of the People's Republic of China	
Wan Li	万里	Old	Not	1916	1933	2015	Shandong	One: State office; Chairman of the Standing Committee of the National People's Congress	
Wu Xueqian	吴学谦	Old	Not	1921	1939	2008	Shanghai	Two: State office; Vice Premier of the People's Republic of China; Minister of Foreign Affairs of the People's Republic of China	
Yang Rudai	杨汝岱	New	Not	1926	1950	2018	Sichuan	One: Party office; Secretary, Sichuan Provincial Committee	
Yang Shangkun	杨尚昆	Old	Not	1907	1926	1998	Chongqing	Three: Party office; Head, Central Leading Group for Taiwan Affairs of the Central Committee; Military office; First-ranked Vice Chairman, Central Military Commission; State office; President of the People's Republic of China	
Yao Yilin	姚依林	Old	Not	1917	1935	1994	Shanghai	Three: State offices; Vice Premier, State Council of the People's Republic of China (before 1988); First-ranked Vice Premier, State Council of the People's Republic of China (from 1988); Minister in charge, State Development Commission	
Zhao Ziyang	赵紫阳	Old	Removed	1919	1938	2005	Henan	Four: Party offices; General Secretary, Central Committee; Leader, Central Leading Group for Financial and Economic Work of the Central Committee; Military offices; Vice Chairman, Central Military Commission of the Central Committee; Vice Chairman, Central Military Commission of the People's Republic of China	

=== Alternate ===
Alternate of the Political Bureau of the 13th Central Committee of the Chinese Communist Party
Officeholder		12th	14th	Birth	PM	Death	Birthplace	Offices held	Ref.
Ding Guangen	丁关根	New	Member	1929	1956	2012	Jiangsu	Two: Party office; Head, United Front Work Department of the Central Committee; State office; Chairman, Taiwan Affairs Office of the State Council	
