= Guo Shengkun =

Chinese politician and business executive

- 郭声琨
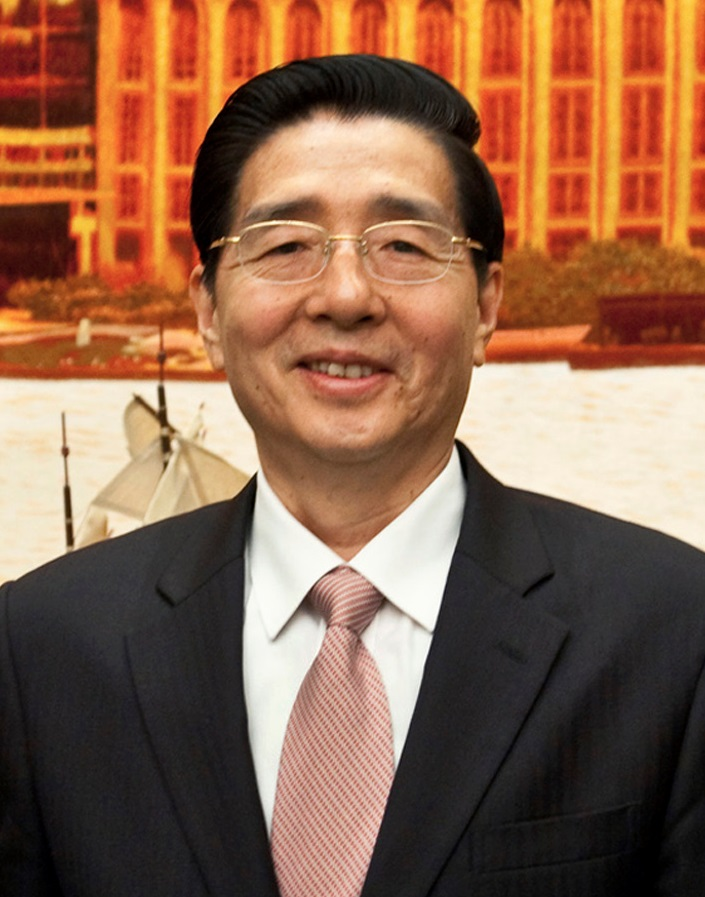

Secretary of the Central Political and Legal Affairs Commission
- In office 31 October 2017 – 28 October 2022
- General Secretary: Xi Jinping
- Preceded by: Meng Jianzhu
- Succeeded by: Chen Wenqing

State Councilor of China
- In office 16 March 2013 – 19 March 2018 Serving with Yang Jing, Chang Wanquan, Yang Jiechi, Wang Yong
- Premier: Li Keqiang

Minister of Public Security
- In office 28 December 2012 – 4 November 2017
- Premier: Wen Jiabao; Li Keqiang
- Deputy: Fu Zhenghua, others
- Preceded by: Meng Jianzhu
- Succeeded by: Zhao Kezhi

Party Secretary of Guangxi
- In office November 2007 – December 2012
- Preceded by: Liu Qibao
- Succeeded by: Peng Qinghua

Personal details
- Born: 16 October 1954 (age 71) Xingguo County, Jiangxi
- Party: Chinese Communist Party
- Education: Jiangxi University of Science and Technology; University of Science and Technology Beijing

Guo Shengkun (Chinese: 郭声琨; born 16 October 1954) is a retired Chinese politician and business executive. Between 2017 and 2022, he was the secretary of the Central Political and Legal Affairs Commission of the Chinese Communist Party, a member of the CCP Politburo, and a secretary of the CCP Secretariat.

Previously Guo served as the minister of Public Security, a state councilor, the Party Secretary of Guangxi and the general manager of Aluminum Corporation of China, a major state-owned enterprise.

== Early life and education ==
A native of Xingguo County, Jiangxi province, Guo Shengkun was born on 16 October 1954. Guo entered the workforce in 1973 during the Cultural Revolution as a sent-down youth at an agricultural commune in his native hometown, and joined the CCP in December 1974. From 1977 to 1979 he studied mining at the Jiangxi Institute of Metallurgy (now Jiangxi University of Science and Technology).

== Career ==
=== Metal industry ===
Starting in 1979 Guo worked in the non-ferrous metal industry in Jiangxi, rising through the ranks of the Machinery Department of the Ministry of Metallurgical Industry to become its section chief, party secretary, and superintendent. He later became the head of the Huamei’ao Mine of China Non-Ferrous Metal Mining Corporation (CNMC) from 1985 to 1992, the head of the Guixi Silver Mine from 1992 to 1993, the head of the Nanchang Branch of the CNMC in Nanchang from 1993 to 1997, the deputy general manager of the CNMC from 1997 to 1998, and the deputy director of the Ministry of Nonferrous Metals from 1999 to 2000.

In 2000 he led the creation of the state-owned enterprise Aluminum Corporation of China Limited (Chinalco) and became the General Manager of the company. He also oversaw the dual listings of Chinalco's subsidiary, Aluminum Corporation of China Limited (Chalco), on the New York and Hong Kong stock exchanges.

=== Politics ===
==== Guangxi ====
After more than two decades in the metal industry, in 2004 Guo was transferred to the government of Guangxi Zhuang Autonomous Region, becoming the deputy party secretary and deputy chairman of the provincial-level region which is rich non-ferrous metal reserves. In November 2007 he succeeded Liu Qibao, who was transferred to Sichuan province, as the Party Secretary of Guangxi. He held the position until December 2012, when he was succeeded by Peng Qinghua.

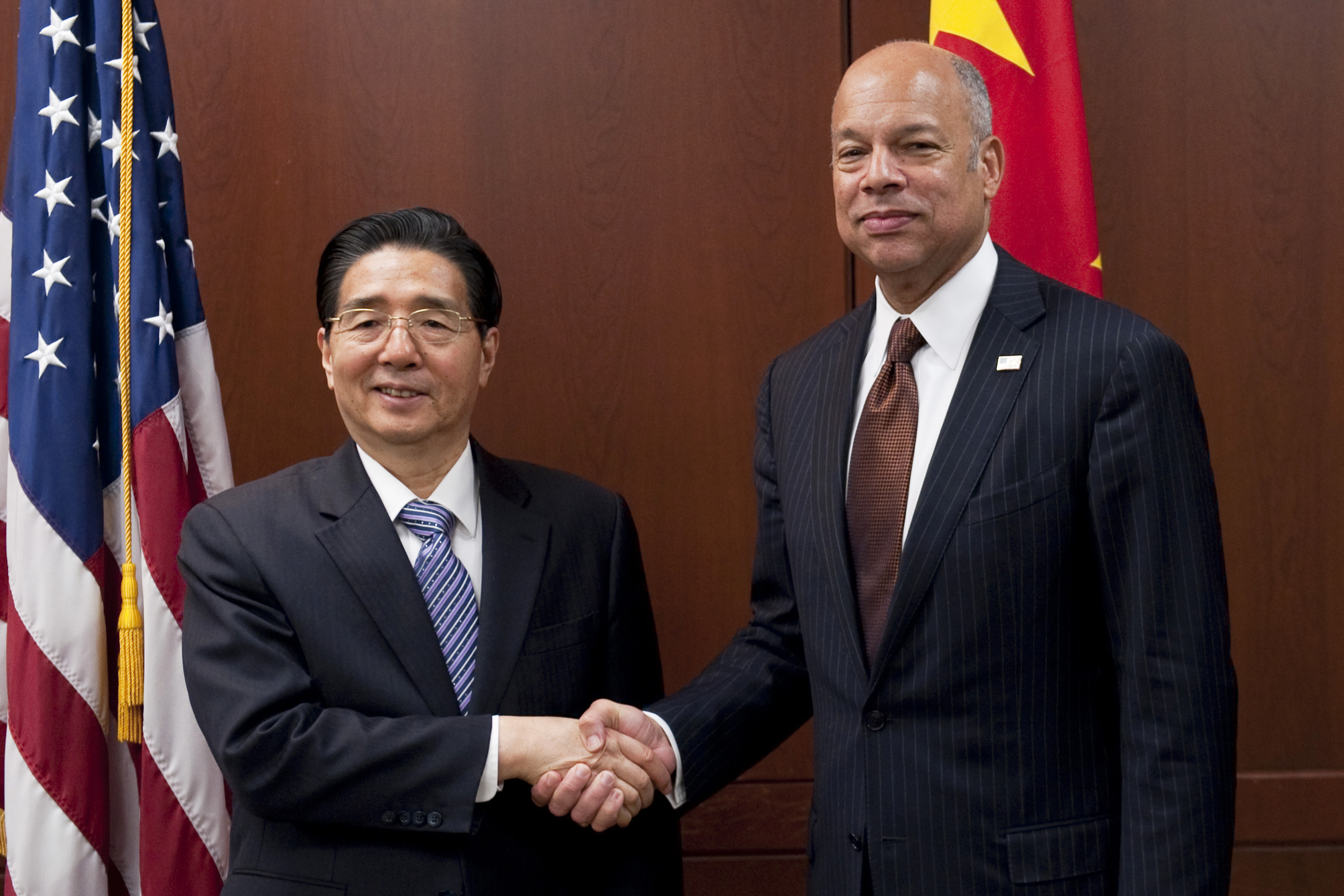
Guo meets with U.S. Secretary of Homeland Security Jeh Johnson at the third U.S.-China High-Level Joint Dialogue on Cybercrime and Related Issues on December 7, 2016, in Washington, D.C.

==== Minister of Public Security ====
In December 2012 Guo was transferred to the national government to succeed Meng Jianzhu as the Minister of Public Security, China's top policeman. Some political analysts questioned his suitability for the post as he had minimal legal experience. On 16 March 2013 Guo was appointed one of the five State Councilors in Li Keqiang government.

Guo Shengkun was an alternate of the 16th and the 17th Central Committees, and a member of the 18th Central Committee.

==== Central Political and Legal Affairs Commission ====
In October 2017, after the 19th Party Congress, Guo was appointed as the Secretary of the Central Political and Legal Affairs Commission (CPLAC) and as a member of the CCP Politburo and Secretariat. He stepped down as State councilor when first Li Keqiang government ended its term in March 2018. In May 2018, he headed the National Leading Group for the Special Campaign to Crack Down on Organized Crime and Eliminate Evil. In February 2021, he headed the National Political and Legal Team Education and Rectification Leading Group. He stepped down from the Politburo and as the CPLAC Secretary in October 2022.

Government offices
Preceded by Meng Jianzhu	Minister of Public Security; December 2012 – November 2017	Succeeded by Zhao Kezhi
Party political offices
Preceded by Meng Jianzhu	Secretary of the Central Political and Legal Affairs Commission; 2017–2022	Incumbent
Preceded by Liu Qibao	Party Secretary of Guangxi; 2007–2012	Succeeded by Peng Qinghua
