= Party Secretary of Sichuan =

Provincial government position in China

Secretary of the Sichuan Provincial Committee of the Chinese Communist Party
- 中国共产党四川省委员会书记
- Emblem of the Chinese Communist Party

- Flag of the Chinese Communist Party

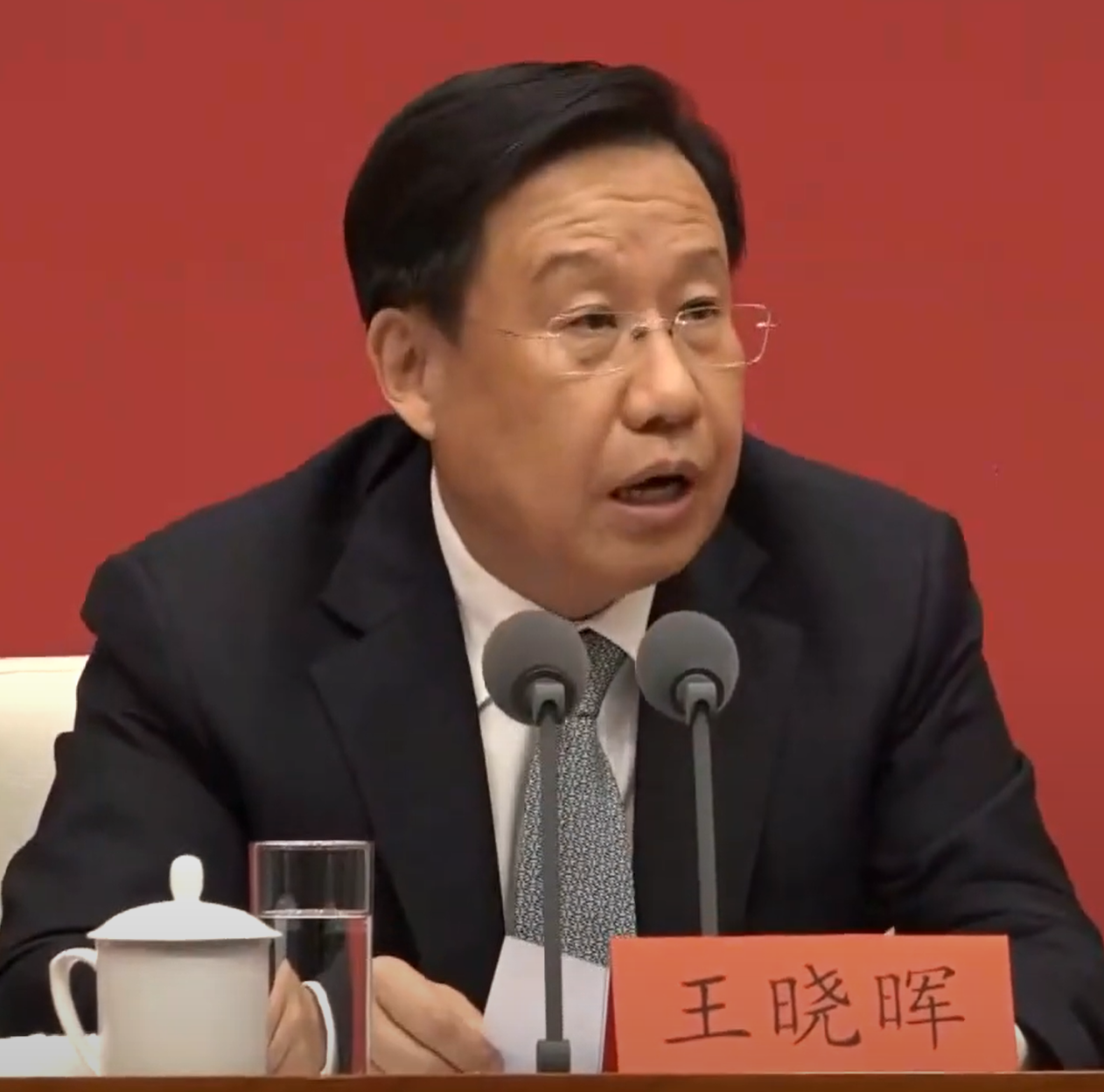
- Incumbent; Wang Xiaohui since 22 April 2022
- Sichuan Provincial Committee of the Chinese Communist Party
- Type: Party Committee Secretary
- Status: Provincial and ministerial-level official
- Member of: Sichuan Provincial Standing Committee
- Nominator: Central Committee
- Appointer: Sichuan Provincial Committee; Central Committee
- Inaugural holder: Li Jingquan
- Formation: September 1952
- Deputy: Deputy Secretary; Secretary-General

The secretary of the Sichuan Provincial Committee of the Chinese Communist Party is the leader of the Sichuan Provincial Committee of the Chinese Communist Party (CCP). As the CCP is the sole ruling party of the People's Republic of China (PRC), the secretary is the highest ranking post in Sichuan.

The secretary is officially appointed by the CCP Central Committee based on the recommendation of the CCP Organization Department, which is then approved by the Politburo and its Standing Committee. The secretary can be also appointed by a plenary meeting of the Sichuan Provincial Committee, but the candidate must be the same as the one approved by the central government. The secretary leads the Standing Committee of the Sichuan Provincial Committee, and is usually a member of the CCP Central Committee. The secretary leads the work of the Provincial Committee and its Standing Committee. The secretary is outranks the governor, who is generally the deputy secretary of the committee.

The current secretary is Wang Xiaohui, who took office on 22 April 2022.

== List of party secretaries ==
No.	Image	Name	Term start	Term end	Ref.
1		Li Jingquan (1909–1989)	September 1952	February 1965	
2		Liao Zhigao (1913–2000)	February 1965	January 1967	
Cultural Revolution Interregnum			1967	1971	
3		Zhang Guohua (1914–1972)	August 1971	February 1972	
4		Liu Xingyuan (1908–1990)	March 1972	October 1975	
5		Zhao Ziyang (1919–2005)	October 1975	March 1980	
6		Tan Qilong (1913–2003)	March 1980	February 1983	
7		Yang Rudai (1926–2018)	February 1983	March 1993	
8		Xie Shijie (born 1934)	March 1993	January 2000	
9		Zhou Yongkang (born 1942)	6 January 2000	5 December 2002	
10		Zhang Xuezhong (born 1943)	5 December 2002	3 December 2006	
11		Du Qinglin (born 1946)	3 December 2006	2 December 2007	
12		Liu Qibao (born 1953)	2 December 2007	21 November 2012	
13		Wang Dongming (born 1956)	21 November 2012	21 March 2018	
14		Peng Qinghua (born 1957)	21 March 2018	22 April 2022	
15		Wang Xiaohui (born 1962)	22 April 2022	Incumbent	
