= Sichuan Economic Daily =

Newspaper from china

- Type: Daily newspaper
- Format: Broadsheet
- Publisher: Sichuan Economic Daily Agency
- Founded: April 1984
- Political alignment: Communism; Socialism with Chinese characteristics
- Language: Chinese
- Headquarters: Chengdu, Sichuan
- OCLC number: 123263432
- Website: scjjrb.com

Sichuan Economic Daily (Chinese: 四川经济日报), also known as Sichuan Jingji Ribao, is a simplified Chinese newspaper published in the People's Republic of China. It is a comprehensive economic broadsheet newspaper, first published in April 1984, and its predecessor was Sichuan Economic Information News (四川经济信息报).

Sichuan Economic Daily is an important public opinion tool of the Sichuan Provincial Committee of the Chinese Communist Party (中共四川省委) and the Sichuan Provincial Government to guide the province's economic work. It is the only state media of the economy in Sichuan Province and the earliest economic newspaper in the Western China.
