= Huayan Temple =

Huayan Temple (simplified Chinese: 华严寺; traditional Chinese: 華嚴寺; pinyin: Huáyán Sì), may refer to:

- Huayan Temple (Datong), in Datong, Shanxi, China
- Huayan Temple (Meishan), in Renshou, Meishan, Sichuan, China
- Huayan Temple (Ningde), in Ningde, Fujian, China
