= Ren Shou No.1 Middle School =

School in Sichuan Province, China

Renshou No.1 Middle School (Chinese: 仁寿一中) is a secondary school in Renshou County, Meishan, in Sichuan, China. Its predecessor was Ao Feng Academy (鳌峰书院), founded in 1764. The name was changed into Ao Feng Middle School in 1906 and then to Renshou County Middle School in 1939. In 1956 it became Renshou No.1 Middle School. It has become the largest middle school in Renshou County and is now a national level demonstrative high school. The school covers an area of 500 mǔ (307,200 square metres (75.9 acres), and the number of academic buildings, office buildings, and dormitories is around 38. In 2007, there were 383 teachers and more than 6,900 students at the school.

== Alumni ==
Famous students include Huang Jiqing, an academician of the Chinese Academy of Sciences, and Yang Rudai, who was vice chairman of the Chinese People's Political Consultative Conference National Committee.
