= Wu Xueqian =

Chinese politician and diplomat

- 吴学谦
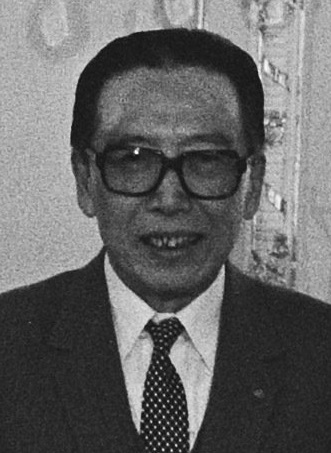
- Wu in 1985

Vice Chairman of the Chinese People's Political Consultative Conference
- In office March 27, 1993 – March 13, 1998
- Chairman: Li Ruihuan

Vice Premier of China
- In office March 25, 1988 – March 5, 1993
- Premier: Li Peng

6th Minister of Foreign Affairs
- In office November 19, 1982 – April 12, 1988
- Premier: Zhao Ziyang
- Preceded by: Huang Hua
- Succeeded by: Qian Qichen

Personal details
- Born: Wu Qingde; December 19, 1921 Shanghai
- Died: April 4, 2008 (aged 86) Beijing
- Party: Chinese Communist Party

Chinese name
- Traditional Chinese: 吳學謙
- Simplified Chinese: 吴学谦
Transcriptions
Standard Mandarin
- Hanyu Pinyin: Wú Xuéqiān
- Wade–Giles: Wu Hsueh-ch'ien

Wu Xueqian (December 19, 1921 – April 4, 2008) was a Chinese politician and diplomat who served as the Minister of Foreign Affairs from 1982 to 1988, and the Vice Premier of China from 1988 to 1993.

== Biography ==
Wu Xueqian was born Wu Qingde (吳慶德) in Shanghai on December 19, 1921. He joined the Chinese Communist Party (CCP) in 1939.

In his youth he was engaged in CCP underground work in Shanghai, serving for a period of time as deputy secretary and acting secretary of the Shanghai Students' Committee of the CCP. In June 1949, he was designated representative of China National Federation of Democratic Youth to the World Federation of Democratic Youth in Prague. After the founding of the People's Republic of China, he served as Deputy Director General and Director General (1949–1958) of the International Liaison Department of the Central Committee of the Youth League (renamed as the Communist Youth League later), Director General (1958–1978) and Vice Minister (1978–1982) of the International Liaison Department of Chinese People's Political Consultative Conference, First Vice-Foreign Minister (April – November 1982).

Wu was the Foreign Minister of China from 1982 to 1988. He was the member of the 13th Politburo of the Chinese Communist Party from 1987 to 1992.

Wu died of an illness on April 4, 2008, aged 86.

Government offices
Preceded by Huang Hua	Minister of Foreign Affairs; 1982–1988	Succeeded by Qian Qichen
