= Huayan Temple (Meishan) =

Buddhist temple in Sichuan, People's Republic of China

- 华严寺
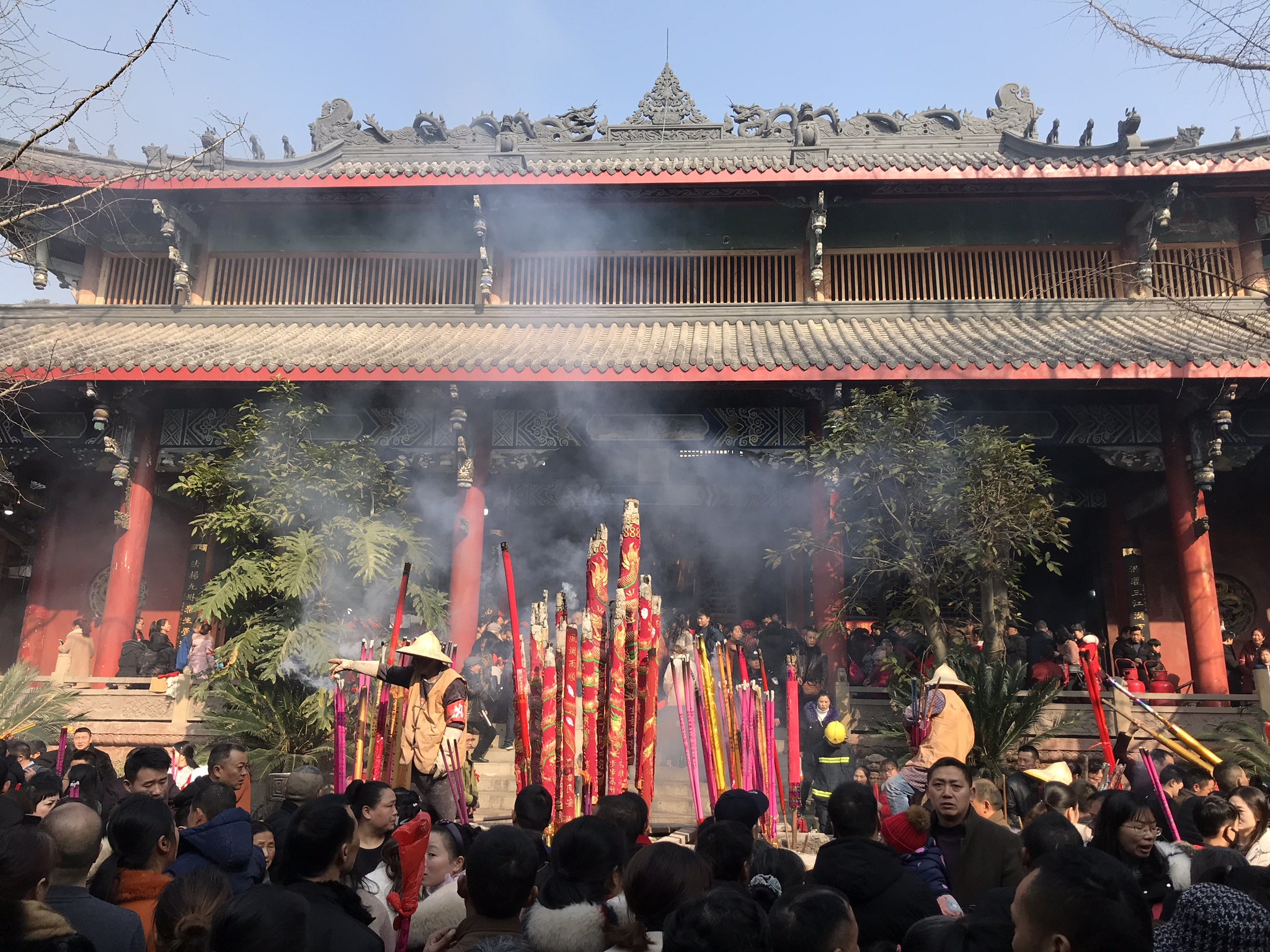
- Chinese New Years at Huayan temple.

Religion
- Affiliation: Buddhism

Location
- Location: Renshou, Meishan, Sichuan
- Country: China

Architecture
- Style: Chinese architecture
- Established: Tang Dynasty
- Completed: 1995 (reconstruction)

Huayan Temple (华严寺) is a Chinese Mahayana Buddhist temple located in Renshou county, Meishan city, Sichuan, China, and was built in the Tang dynasty under the name of Chaojue Temple (超觉寺). Chaojue Temple was later named Kua-ao Temple (跨鳌寺). After the Chinese Cultural Revolution the temple was reopened in March 1995 as Huayan Temple. It is currently run by Master Shi Hongfa (释洪法).

== History ==
- Chaojue Temple was founded in the Tang dynasty.
- During the Qing dynasty it was still called Chaojue Temple.
- It was later remained Kua-ao temple.
- It was reopened and renamed Huayan temple in March 1995.
- In 1998, multiple buildings were reconstructed including the prayer hall, hall of heaven, main hall, Guanyin hall, among others.
