= Liu Qibao =

Chinese politician

- 刘奇葆
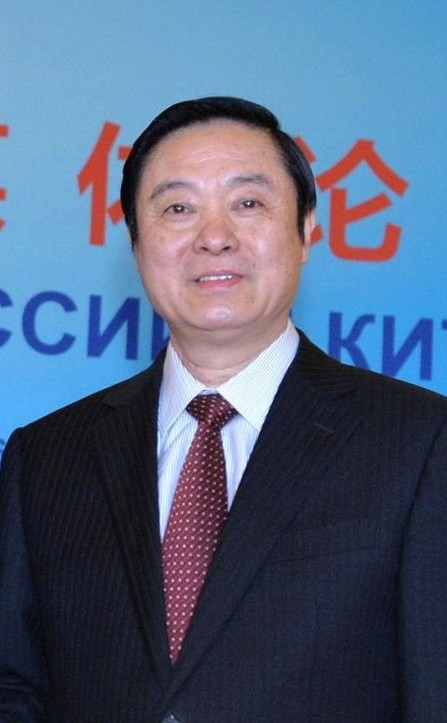
- Liu in 2016

Vice Chairman of the Chinese People's Political Consultative Conference
- In office 14 March 2018 – 10 March 2023
- Chairman: Wang Yang

Head of the Publicity Department of the Chinese Communist Party
- In office 21 November 2012 – 30 October 2017
- Deputy: Luo Shugang (2012–2014); Huang Kunming (2014–2017)
- General Secretary: Xi Jinping
- Preceded by: Liu Yunshan
- Succeeded by: Huang Kunming

Party Secretary of Sichuan
- In office 2 December 2007 – 21 November 2012
- Deputy: Jiang Jufeng (Governor); Li Chongxi (zhuanzhi)
- Preceded by: Du Qinglin
- Succeeded by: Wang Dongming

Personal details
- Born: January 1953 (age 72–73) Susong, Anhui, China
- Party: Chinese Communist Party
- Education: Anhui Normal University

Liu Qibao (Chinese: 刘奇葆; pinyin: Liú Qíbǎo; born January 1953) is a Chinese retired politician. He was a member of the 18th Politburo of the Chinese Communist Party, a Secretary of the Secretariat of the Chinese Communist Party, as well as the head of the Publicity Department of the Central Committee. Previously Liu have served as the party chief of the Guangxi Zhuang Autonomous Region and Sichuan province. He also served as one of the vice chairmen of 13th Chinese People's Political Consultative Conference between 2018 and 2023.

== Early life and education ==
Liu Qibao was born in a village near the banks of the Yangtze River in Susong County, Anhui Province in 1953, the second of four children. After graduating from high school Liu worked on a farm. Liu joined the Communist Party in December 1971 and next year joined its Communist Youth League (CYL). He attended Anhui Normal University as a "Worker-Peasant-Soldier student" where he was a student of history at the Department of History.

== Career ==
After graduating in 1974, Liu Qibao was a cadre at the Theoretical Research Office of the Department of Publicity, CPC Anhui Provincial Committee. Following it, he eventually became secretary to Wan Li, then provincial Party Secretary of Anhui.

In 1980, Wan Li was transferred to work for the central authorities in Beijing. Liu was sent to work for the CYL Anhui Provincial Committee, where he gained rapid career advancement. He led propaganda and ideology work at the CYL, eventually rising to lead the provincial CYL organization. In February 1984, he became mayor of Suzhou, Anhui, a city with jurisdiction over some four million people, at only 31 years old. In November 1985, he was transferred to the CYL national organization, where he worked alongside future leaders Liu Yandong, Li Keqiang, and Li Yuanchao. Since then he has been identified by some observers as part of the "tuanpai", or "Youth League faction".

Liu left the Youth League in 1993 to serve as the deputy chief editor of People's Daily, then he worked under Luo Gan and Wang Zhongyu as deputy Secretary-General of the State Council. Additionally he took on leading roles in the offices for the State Council task force on information technology, and the Central Commission for Spiritual Civilization.

Liu served as the Communist Party chief of Guangxi Zhuang Autonomous Region beginning in 2006 and remained in that office for roughly a year. He was appointed Sichuan's Communist Party Secretary in December 2007. He was selected to be the chairman of the Standing Committee of the Sichuan Provincial People's Congress on January 27, 2008. He served as the chief of the Chinese Communist Party Sichuan Committee, the province's top leader from 2008 to 2012.

At the 18th Party Congress held in November 2012, Liu was promoted to the 18th Politburo of the Chinese Communist Party, and named head of the Publicity Department of the Central Committee, succeeding Liu Yunshan (no relation), who became a member of the Politburo Standing Committee.

In 2017 Qibao met with Prime Minister Alexis Tsipras in Athens, Greece.

On the 100th anniversary of the October Revolution in 2017, Liu stated that the revolution had "opened an unprecedented new model of modernization in world history" which allowed the USSR to transform from a "state of small peasants" to a world-class industrial power. According to Liu, the historical achievements of the revolution and the Soviet socialist system "are by no means canceled out by the dissolution of the USSR."

At the 19th Party Congress held in October 2017, Liu was unable to secure a Politburo seat even though he had not yet reached the conventional retirement at the age of 68. He held onto a seat on the Central Committee, however. On March 14, 2018, he was named one of the vice-chairmen of the Chinese People's Political Consultative Conference.

Assembly seats
Preceded by Du Qinglin	Chairman of Sichuan People's Congress; 2008–2013	Succeeded by Wang Dongming
Party political offices
Preceded by Liu Yunshan	Head of the Publicity Department of the Chinese Communist Party; 2012–2017	Succeeded by Huang Kunming
Preceded by Cao Bochun	Party Secretary of Guangxi; 2006–2007	Succeeded by Guo Shengkun
Preceded by Du Qinglin	Party Secretary of Sichuan; 2007–2012	Succeeded by Wang Dongming
