= He Wei =

Chairman of the Chinese Peasants' and Workers' Democratic Party

- 何维
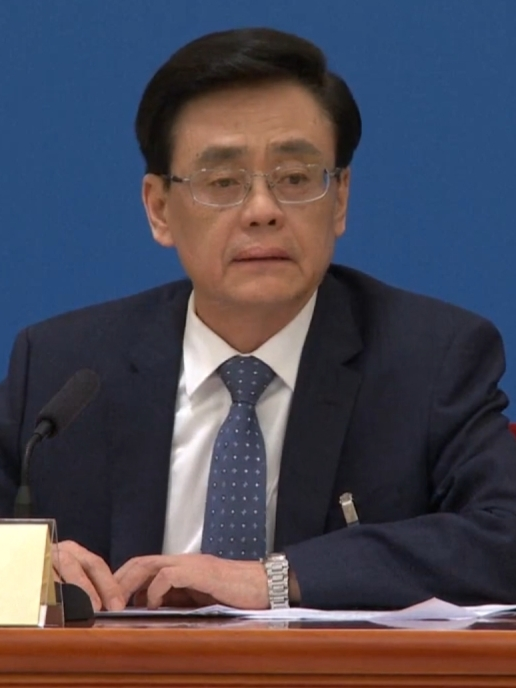
- He in 2023

Vice Chairman of the Standing Committee of the National People's Congress
- Incumbent
- Assumed office 10 March 2023
- Chairman: Zhao Leji

Chairman of the Chinese Peasants' and Workers' Democratic Party
- Incumbent
- Assumed office 9 December 2022
- Preceded by: Chen Zhu

President of the Red Cross Society of China
- Incumbent
- Assumed office 10 October 2024
- Preceded by: Chen Zhu

Vice Chairman of the Chinese People's Political Consultative Conference
- In office 14 March 2018 – 10 March 2023
- Chairman: Wang Yang

Personal details
- Born: December 1955 (age 70) Hulan District, Heilongjiang, China
- Party: Chinese Peasants' and Workers' Democratic Party
- Education: Jiamusi Medical College; Heilongjiang College of Chinese Medicine; Heidelberg University

He Wei (Chinese: 何维, born December 1955) is a Chinese politician, who is currently a vice chairperson of the Standing Committee of the National People's Congress, and the chairman of the Chinese Peasants' and Workers' Democratic Party. Between 2018 and 2023, he served as a vice chairperson of the Chinese People's Political Consultative Conference.

== Biography ==
On 10 October 2024, he succeeded Chen Zhu as the president of the Red Cross Society of China.

On 10 March 2023, during the 14th National People's Congress, he was appointed Vice Chairman of the Standing Committee of the National People's Congress.
