= He Haoju =

Chinese politician (1922–2023)

- 何郝炬

Chairman of Sichuan Provincial People's Congress
- In office 1985–1993
- Preceded by: Du Xinyuan
- Succeeded by: Yang Xizong

Personal details
- Born: May 1922 Chengdu, Sichuan, China
- Died: 20 January 2023 (aged 100) Chengdu, Sichuan, China
- Party: Chinese Communist Party

He Haoju (Chinese: 何郝炬; pinyin: Hé Hǎojù; May 1922 – 20 January 2023) was a Chinese politician who served as chairman of Sichuan Provincial People's Congress from 1985 to 1993. He was a delegate to the 6th, 7th, and 8th National People's Congress.

== Early life and education ==
He was born in Chengdu, Sichuan, in 1922. He joined the Chinese Communist Party (CCP) in 1938.

== Political career ==
He went to Yan'an, Shaanxi at the end of 1937 and worked in southern Shanxi from then to 1940, where he successively served as secretary of the Youth Committee of the CCP Xia County Central Committee and head of the Organization of Quyijiang Central County Committee.

In the autumn of 1940, he became a member of the Northern Bureau of the CCP Central Committee and was transferred to the Hebei and Shandong border areas for inspection and inspection until 1945.

In 1948, he served as deputy director of the Civil Movement Department of the Party Committee of the Henan, Anhui and Jiangsu Border Region of the Chinese Communist Party and director of the Henan, Anhui and Jiangsu Logistics (Front Branch) Command and subsequently director of Logistics and Transportation Department of the Second Field Army.

After establishment of the Communist State in 1949, he was appointed director of the Chongqing Branch of the Yangtze River Shipping Bureau of the Ministry of Communications and head of the Public Equity Group of Minsheng Company, and served until 1958, when he was chosen as deputy minister of National Construction Engineering Ministry.

In 1977, he was made vice governor of Sichuan, a post he kept until 1985, when he was promoted to become chairman of Sichuan Provincial People's Congress.

On 20 January 2023, he died in Chengdu, Sichuan, at the age of 100, from COVID-19 during the COVID-19 pandemic in China.

Assembly seats
Preceded by Du Xinyuan	Chairman of Sichuan Provincial People's Congress; 1985–1993	Succeeded by Yang Xizong
