= Renshou County =

Renshou County 仁寿县
- County
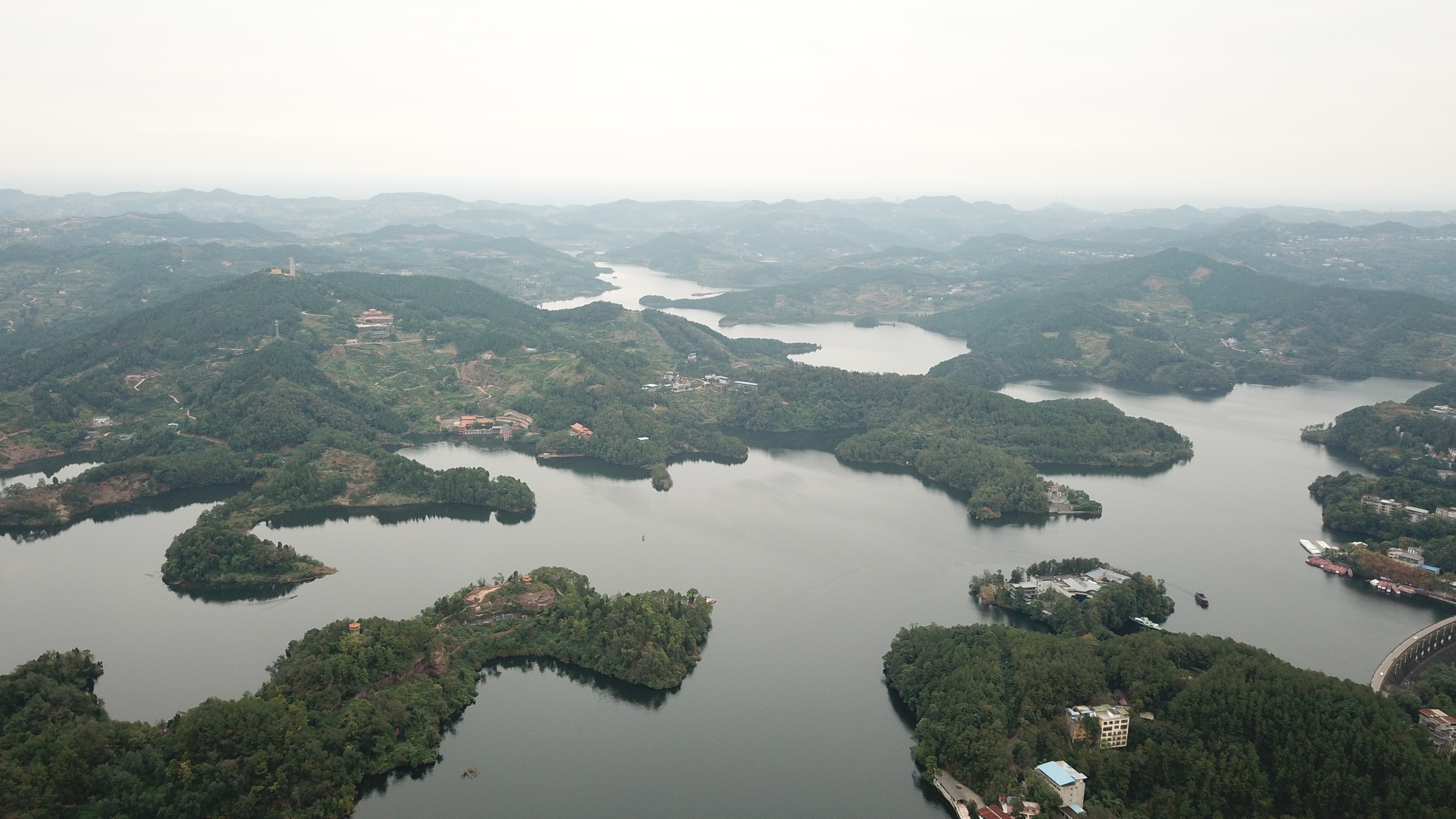

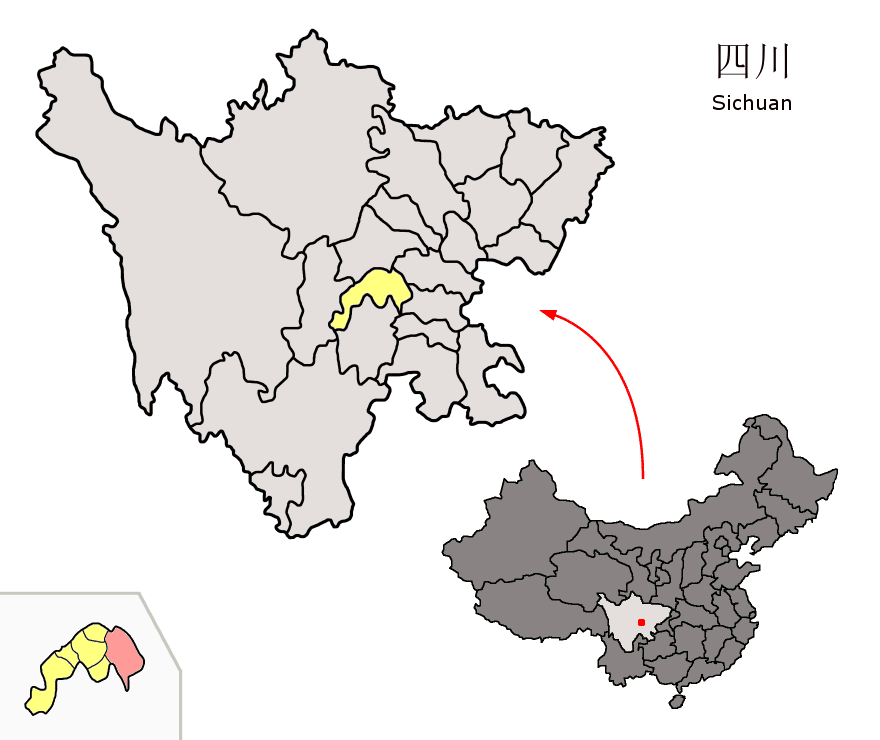
- Location of Renshou County (red) within Meishan City (yellow) and Sichuan
- Coordinates: 29°59′44″N 104°08′03″E
- Country: China
- Province: Sichuan
- Prefecture-level city: Meishan

Area
  - County: 2,716.86 km^{2} (1,048.99 sq mi)

Population (2020 census)
  - County: 1,110,017
  - Density: 408.566/km^{2} (1,058.18/sq mi)
  - Urban: 472,472
- Time zone: UTC+8 (China Standard)
- Postal code: 620500
- Area code: 028
- Website: http://www.rs.gov.cn/index.htm

Renshou County (simplified Chinese: 仁寿县; traditional Chinese: 仁壽縣; pinyin: Rénshòu Xiàn) is a county of Sichuan Province, China. It is located in Middle-West of Sichuan Basin. It located south of Chengdu, the administration of Meishan. It has an area of 2,716.86 km^{2} (1,048.99 sq mi), and population of 1,110,017 in 2020. Founded in the Qin dynasty, Its name may derive from the first Sui Dynasty emperor's palace located in Shaanxi province, Renshou palace. During the Southern Dynasties it was called Huairen County (怀仁县) and in the Western Wei of the Northern Dynasties it was called Puning County (普宁县). Its name was changed to Renshou in 598 during the Sui Dynasty.

== Demographics ==
Though Renshou is majority Han Chinese there is a small population of Hui, Yi, Lisu, and Tibetan peoples.

== Language ==
While Mandarin in the official language, most residents speak the a dialect Renshou-Fushun subdialect of Sichuanese. Tonally, the Renshou dialect has a higher rising tone then the other subdialects in the region.

== Climate ==
Climate data for Renshou, elevation 435 m (1,427 ft), (1991–2020 normals, extremes 1981–present)
Month	Jan	Feb	Mar	Apr	May	Jun	Jul	Aug	Sep	Oct	Nov	Dec	Year
Record high °C (°F)	19.9 (67.8)	23.6 (74.5)	32.7 (90.9)	34.0 (93.2)	36.8 (98.2)	36.9 (98.4)	41.9 (107.4)	41.5 (106.7)	37.3 (99.1)	30.4 (86.7)	26.2 (79.2)	18.1 (64.6)	41.9 (107.4)
Mean daily maximum °C (°F)	10.0 (50.0)	13.1 (55.6)	18.2 (64.8)	23.9 (75.0)	27.6 (81.7)	29.3 (84.7)	31.2 (88.2)	31.1 (88.0)	26.5 (79.7)	21.4 (70.5)	16.9 (62.4)	11.3 (52.3)	21.7 (71.1)
Daily mean °C (°F)	7.0 (44.6)	9.6 (49.3)	13.9 (57.0)	18.9 (66.0)	22.6 (72.7)	24.9 (76.8)	26.8 (80.2)	26.5 (79.7)	22.7 (72.9)	18.1 (64.6)	13.7 (56.7)	8.5 (47.3)	17.8 (64.0)
Mean daily minimum °C (°F)	4.6 (40.3)	6.9 (44.4)	10.6 (51.1)	15.1 (59.2)	18.8 (65.8)	21.5 (70.7)	23.5 (74.3)	23.1 (73.6)	19.9 (67.8)	15.8 (60.4)	11.3 (52.3)	6.2 (43.2)	14.8 (58.6)
Record low °C (°F)	−2.7 (27.1)	−2.0 (28.4)	−0.4 (31.3)	5.7 (42.3)	8.6 (47.5)	14.8 (58.6)	17.3 (63.1)	15.4 (59.7)	12.4 (54.3)	4.6 (40.3)	1.3 (34.3)	−3.3 (26.1)	−3.3 (26.1)
Average precipitation mm (inches)	10.2 (0.40)	13.2 (0.52)	27.6 (1.09)	56.8 (2.24)	85.4 (3.36)	131.7 (5.19)	182.7 (7.19)	197.4 (7.77)	108.8 (4.28)	43.0 (1.69)	16.7 (0.66)	8.3 (0.33)	881.8 (34.72)
Average precipitation days (≥ 0.1 mm)	7.8	7.8	10.0	12.1	13.2	14.5	14.6	13.8	14.7	14.1	7.4	7.0	137
Average snowy days	0.8	0.3	0	0	0	0	0	0	0	0	0	0.3	1.4
Average relative humidity (%)	77	74	70	69	67	75	78	77	80	81	78	78	75
Mean monthly sunshine hours	42.4	53.8	92.3	126.5	126.1	109.4	133.6	142.6	74.6	51.0	55.0	40.3	1,047.6
Percentage possible sunshine	13	17	25	33	30	26	31	35	20	15	17	13	23
Source: China Meteorological Administrationall-time July and extreme temperatureall-time January highall-time August High

== 1993 riots ==
From mid-May to June 1993, Renshou County was the site of mass anti-tax riots, where up to 10,000 peasants protested tax measures by Deng Xiaoping’s economic reforms. Causes cited for the riots include an increase in taxes and fees, failure of local officials to pay for grain collection, and the generally low income of rural residents in the area.

== Tianfu New Area ==
In recent years, Renshou County has integrated into the Tianfu New Area (天府新区). The distance from Renshou's downtown to Chengdu, the capital of Sichuan Province, is 110 kilometers, and it is125 kilometers to Shuangliu International Airport. It also gives Renshou access to the new Chengdu Tianfu International Airport only 100 kilometers away opened in 2021.

== Transport ==
- China National Highway G213
- China National Highway G4215
- China National Highway G351
- Chengzilu Expressway S4
- Guanghong Expressway S40
- Expressway S106
- Chengdu No. 3 Raocheng Express

== Administrative divisions ==
Renshou County comprises 4 subdistricts, 26 towns and 2 townships:

Subdistricts:

- Wenlin Subdistrict (文林街道), Puning Subdistrict (普宁街道), Huairen Subdistrict (怀仁街道), Shigao Subdistrict (视高街道);

Towns:

- Wengong (文宫镇), Hejia (禾加镇), Longma (龙马镇), Fangjia (方家镇), Dahua (大化镇), Gaojia (高家镇), Lujia (禄加镇), Baofei (宝飞镇), Zhangjia (彰加镇), Cihang (慈航镇), Wangyang (汪洋镇), Zhongxiang (钟祥镇), Shijian (始建镇), Manjing (满井镇), Fujia (富加镇), Longzheng (龙正镇), Heilongtan (黑龙滩镇), Beidou (北斗镇), Baoma (宝马镇), Zhujia (珠嘉镇), Caojia (曹家镇), Xie'an (谢安镇), Xindian (新店镇), Outang (藕塘镇), Banqiao (板桥镇), Guiping (贵平镇);

Townships:

- Yucheng Township (虞丞乡), Qinggang Township (青岗乡).

Division	Area in km^{2}	Population	Administrative Villages 行政村	Neighborhoods社区	Economic Groups 经济社	Villages 村	Townships 镇	Minorities
Wangyang town 汪洋镇	174.52	107,518 (120,000 often reside)	36	11	294			
Heilongtan town 黑龙滩镇	180.6	52,000		7	166	4		
Fujia town 富加镇	94.03	81,600	11	7		243		
Baofei town 宝飞镇	79.56	49,229		12		137		
Manjing town 满井镇	83.06	43,168	9		114			
Zhongxiang town 钟祥镇	78.7	45,489		5		5		
Zhangjia town 彰加镇	73.32	40,960	10	3				
Beidou town 北斗镇								
Cihang town 慈航镇	60.48	32,060	5	3		108		
Lujia town 禄加镇	95.9					15		
Dahua town 大化镇	68	36,700	5	3				
Kaijian town 始建镇	47.5	42,050						
Wengong town 文宫镇								
Longzheng town 龙正镇	115.56	46,000	6	7	112			
Longma town 龙马镇	99.66	540,000		2	220	11	3 (Longma, Longqiao, and Fengwu)	
Hejia town 禾加镇	87.6	61,784						
Fangjia town 方家镇	46.69	3,160						
Baoma town 宝马镇								
Zhujia town 珠嘉镇								
Caojia town 曹家镇								
Xindian town 新店镇								
Xie-an town谢安镇		31,320			96			
Outang town 藕塘镇								
Banqiao town 板桥镇								
Yucheng township 虞丞乡	82.26	17,554						
Qinggang township 青岗乡	29.6	15,351			56	9		1,986 Hui and 83 Yi, Dai, and Tibetan
Wenlin residential district 文林街道	56.2	96,000 (14,000 commonly reside)		12				
Puning residential district 普宁街道	52.52	58,397 (101498 commonly reside)		13				
Huairen residential district 怀仁街道	47	125,000		13				

== Schools ==
- Ren Shou No.1 Middle School

== Tourism ==
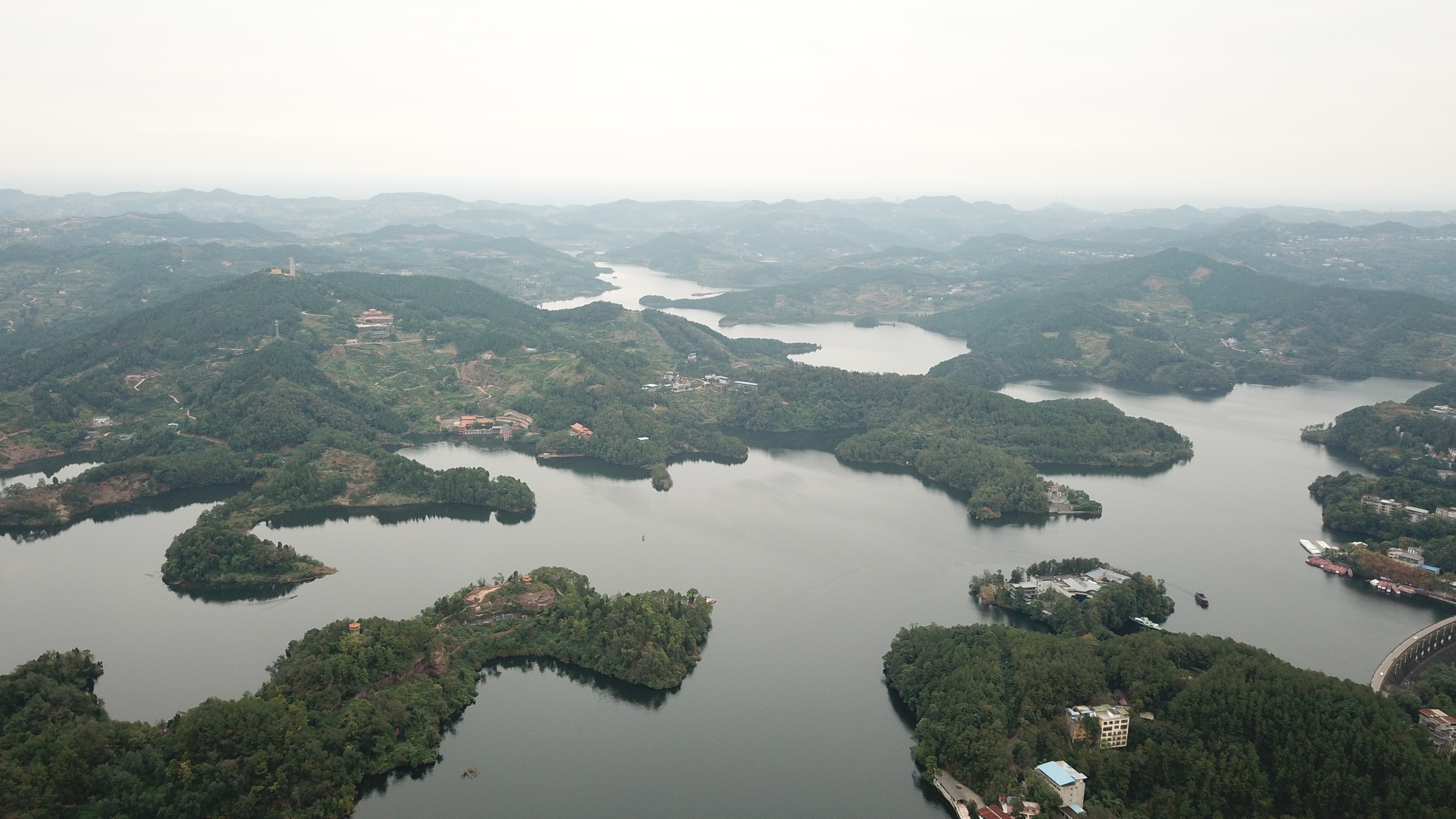
Drone photo of Heilongtan Lake

- Heilongtan Lake 黑龙滩湖
- Stairway to Heaven Park 天梯公园
- Great Bear Pavilion 奎星阁
- Huayan Temple 华严寺
- Renshou Christian Church
- Renshou Catholic Church
- Renshou Giant Buddha 仁寿大佛 (Also called Niujiaozhai Giant Buddha 牛角寨大佛)
- Thousand Buddha Rock 千佛岩
- Rock Buddha Ravine 石佛沟

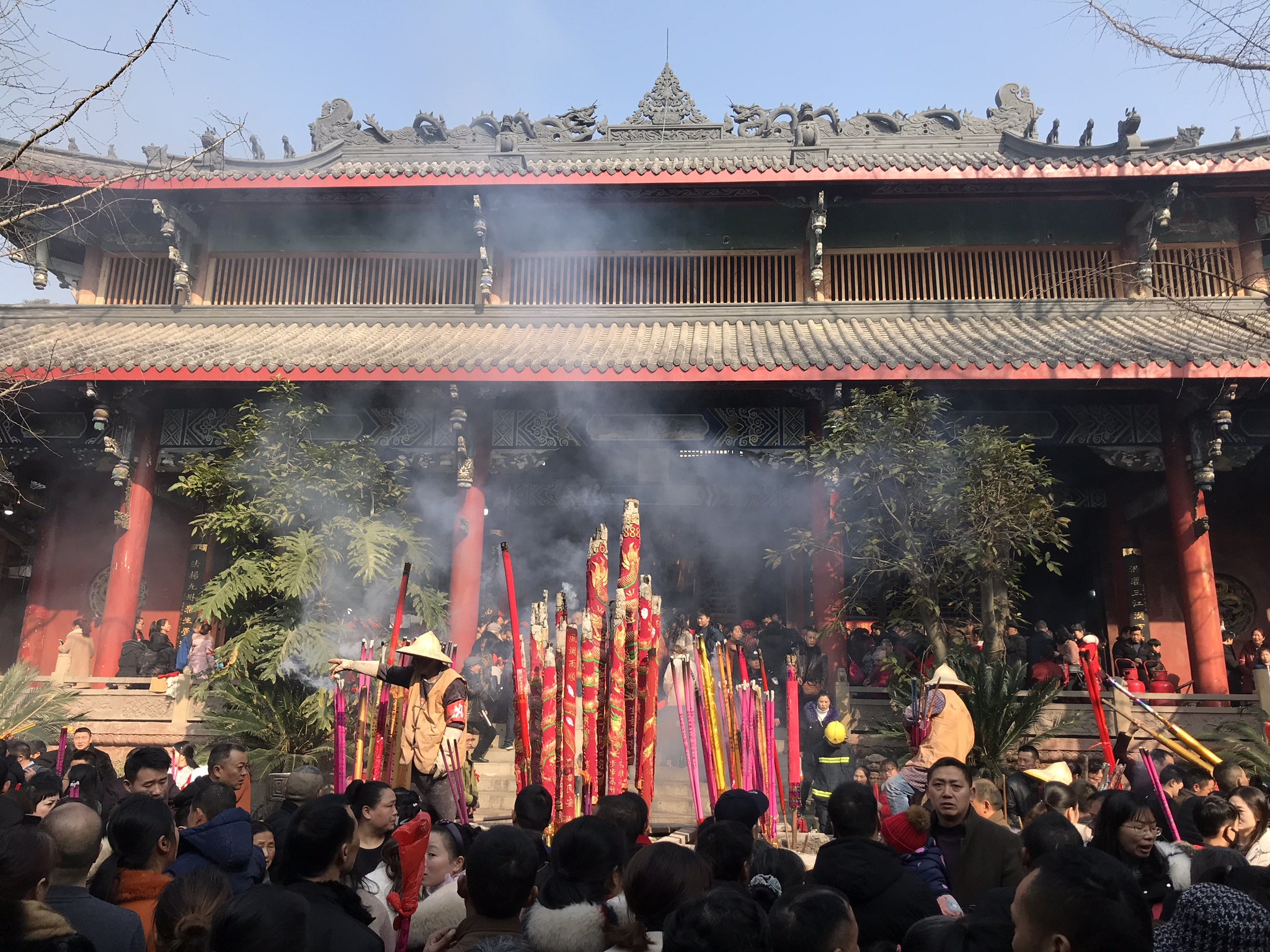
Huayan temple during Chinese New Years 2019.

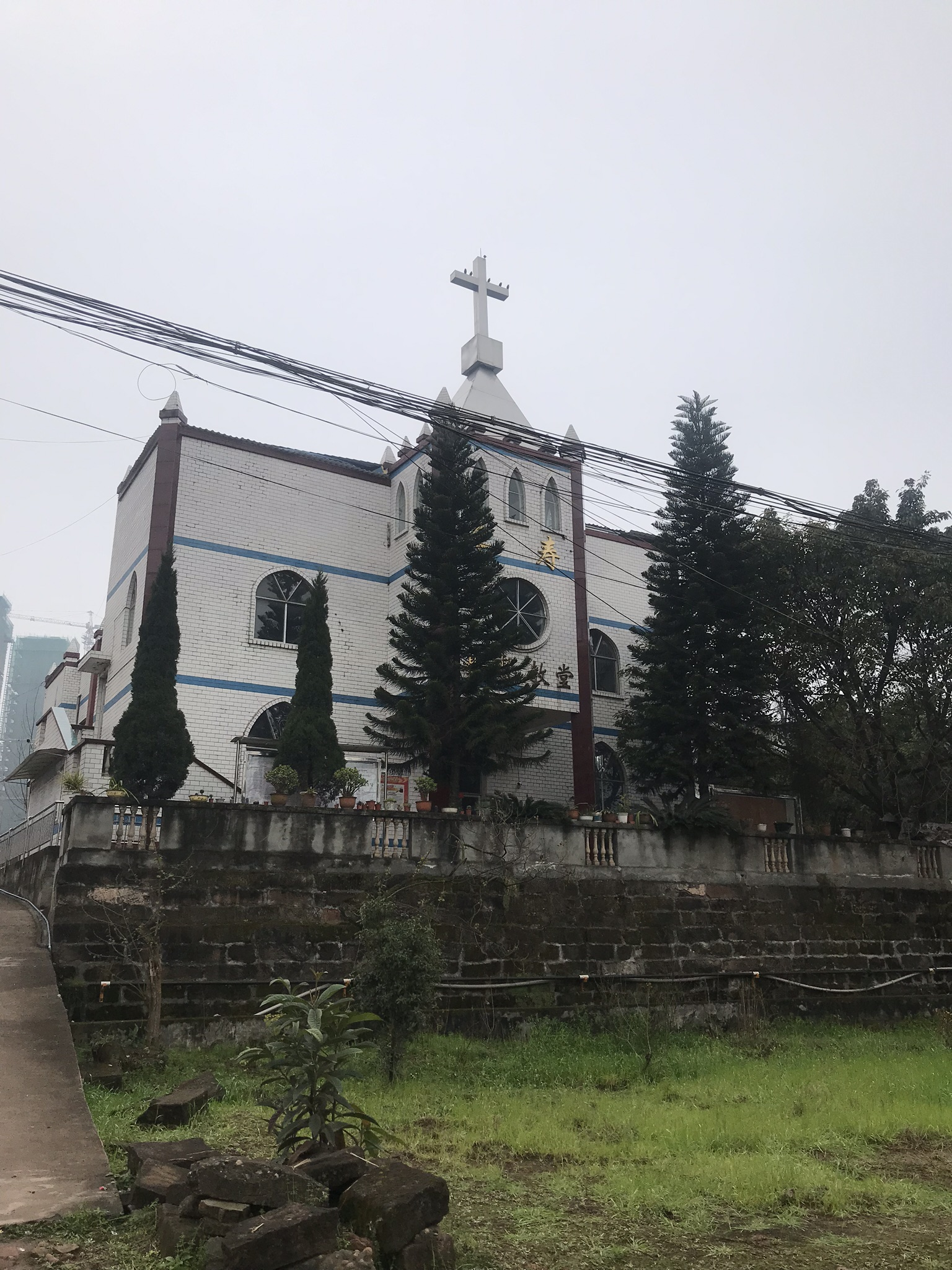
Renshou Christian Church

== Local products ==
- Pipa Fruit (type of loquat fruit) 枇杷
- Fengshui Pear 丰水梨
- Renshou Sesame Cake 仁寿芝麻糕
- Wangyang Dried Beef 汪洋干巴牛肉
