= Jiangxi University of Science and Technology =

Public University in Jiangxi, China

Coordinates: 25°51′39″N 114°56′08″E

- 江西理工大学
- Type: Public
- Established: 1958
- Location: Ganzhou, Jiangxi, China
- Website: Official Website

Jiangxi University of Science and Technology (Chinese: 江西理工大学; pinyin: Jiāngxī Lǐgōng Dàxué) is a university located in Ganzhou City, Jiangxi Province, People's Republic of China.

== History ==
Established in 1958, this university was formerly known as Jiangxi Institute of Metallurgy. The university was renamed as Southern Institute of Metallurgy in 1988.

== Schools ==
- School of Environmental and Construction Engineering
- School of Material and Chemical Engineering
- School of Mechanical and Electronic Engineering
- School of Information Engineering
- School of Economics and Management
- School of Sciences
- School of Liberal Arts and Law
- School of Foreign Studies
- School of Continuing Education
- School of Higher Vocational and Technical Education (Nanchang Campus)
- Applied Science Institute (Jinshawan Campus)

== See also ==
- Jinggangshan University
