= Wang Xiaohui =

Chinese politician

- 王晓晖
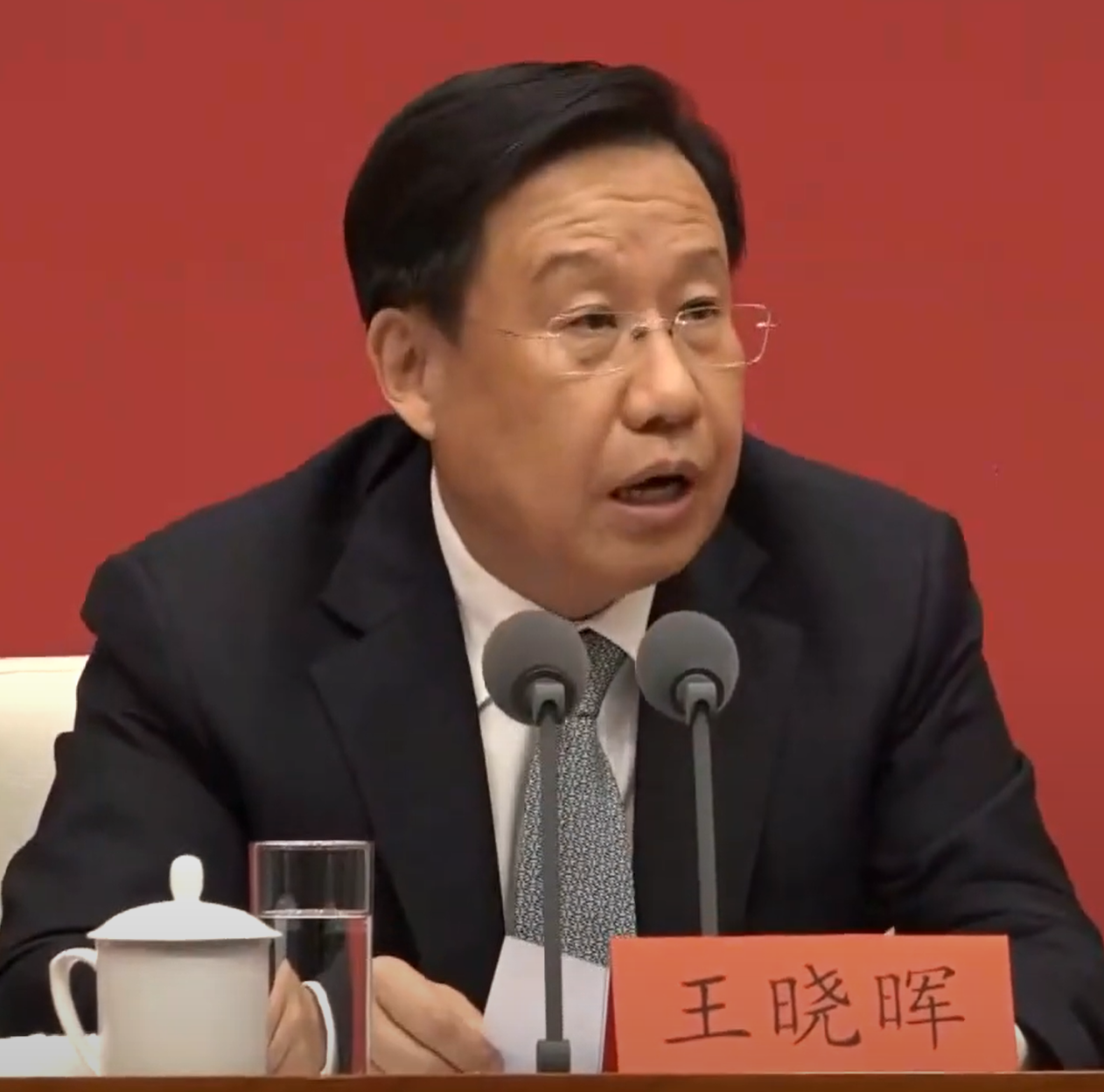
- Wang in 2020

Party Secretary of Sichuan
- Incumbent
- Assumed office 22 April 2022
- Deputy: Huang Qiang; Shi Xiaolin (governor)
- Preceded by: Peng Qinghua

Chairman of the Standing Committee of the Sichuan Provincial People's Congress
- Incumbent
- Assumed office 15 January 2023
- Preceded by: Peng Qinghua

Director of the China Film Administration
- In office 24 May 2018 – 18 April 2022
- Preceded by: New title

Personal details
- Born: August 1962 (age 64) (exact date of birth unclear) Changling County, Jilin, China
- Party: Chinese Communist Party
- Education: Jilin University

Chinese name
- Simplified Chinese: 王晓晖
- Traditional Chinese: 王曉暉
Transcriptions
Standard Mandarin
- Hanyu Pinyin: Wáng Xiǎohuī

Wang Xiaohui (Chinese: 王晓晖; born August 1962) is a Chinese politician who is the current party secretary of Sichuan, in office since April 2022. Previously he served as director of the National Film Administration and deputy head of the Publicity Department of the Chinese Communist Party. He is a representative of the 19th National Congress of the Chinese Communist Party and a member of the 19th Central Committee of the Chinese Communist Party.

== Biography ==
Wang was born in Changling County, Jilin, in 1962. He earned his master's degree in law from Jilin University.

After university in 1986, he was assigned to the Publicity Department of the Chinese Communist Party, where he was eventually promoted to deputy head in 2009. He concurrently served as director of the China Film Administration since May 2018.

In April 2022, he was transferred to southwest China's Sichuan province and appointed party secretary, the top political position in the province.

Party political offices
Preceded by He Yiting	Executive Deputy Director of the Central Policy Research Office; 2017–2018	Succeeded by Jiang Jinquan
Preceded by Huang Kunming	Executive Deputy Head of the Publicity Department of the Chinese Communist Party; Director of the Office of the Central Spiritual Civilization Construction Steering Committee; 2018–2022	Succeeded by Li Shulei
Preceded by Peng Qinghua	Party Secretary of Sichuan; 2022–present	Incumbent
Government offices
New title	Director of the China Film Administration; 2018–2022	Succeeded by TBA
