= Zhang Xuezhong (politician) =

Chinese politician

- 张学忠

Party Secretary of Sichuan
- In office 5 December 2002 – 3 December 2006
- Preceded by: Zhou Yongkang
- Succeeded by: Du Qinglin

Personal details
- Born: February 1943 (age 83) Lanzhou, Gansu, China
- Party: Chinese Communist Party
- Education: Northwest Normal University, Lanzhou University Central Party School

Chinese name
- Simplified Chinese: 张学忠
- Traditional Chinese: 張學忠
Transcriptions
Standard Mandarin
- Hanyu Pinyin: Zhāng Xuézhōng

Zhang Xuezhong (Chinese: 张学忠; born February 1943) is a Chinese politician and a deputy to the National People's Congress. He has held important party positions in the provinces including the vice governor of Gansu and the party secretary of Sichuan. He has also held the post of the Minister of Human Resources and Social Security in the central government. Zhang is considered an ally of the former General Secretary of the Chinese Communist Party (CCP) Hu Jintao.

== Career ==
Zhang Xuezhong was born in February 1943 in Lanzhou, Gansu Province. He graduated from both the Northwest Normal University (1961) and Lanzhou University (1966) majoring in Chinese language and literature. Zhang subsequently worked as a primary school teacher. He joined the CCP in December 1960. For much of his initial career he taught at the Lanzhou Teachers' School but in 1990 he assumed provincial party and military posts. Zhang studied at the Central Party School between 1990 and 1994. In 1994 he transferred to Beijing and soon became the Minister of Human Resources and Social Security.

Zhang is considered an ally of Hu Jintao, the former General Secretary of the CCP. Zhang got to know Hu when he worked as a personal secretary of Song Ping, former party secretary of Gansu Province. Zhang's connection with Hu put him in a difficult position when farmers in Hanyuan County, Sichuan Province protested the central government's refusal to allow farmers more political rights. The hotel where Zhang was staying was surrounded and the police clashed with the demonstrators resulting in ten casualties. His current position as the party secretary of Sichuan, too, is seen as Hu's project to raise his status before he is potentially given more important promotions.

Zhang was the chairman of the Standing Committee of the Sichuan Provincial Committee from 2003 to 2006 and secretary of the Sichuan Party Committee from 2002 to 2006. He is a deputy to the National People's Congress representing Sichuan Province. Zhang is also a member of the 16th Central Committee of the CPC and an alternate member of its Politburo.

Throughout his career, Zhang has held the following posts:

- Secretary of General Office of the CPC Provincial Committee of Gansu Province, 1964–1977
- Secretary of the Revolutionary Committee of the Production office in Gansu Province, 1964–1977
- Secretary of the Corps Command Office of the Lanzhou Military Region of the People's Liberation Army; 1977–1978, 1979–1980
- Secretary of the CPC Fafang People's Commune, Wuwei County, 1978–1979
- Secretary of the CPC County Committee of Yuzhong County, Gansu Province, 1980–1983
- Deputy-secretary of the CPC City Committee of Lanzhou City, Gansu Province, 1983–1985
- Secretary of the CPC Prefectural Committee of Longnan, Gansu Province, 1985–1989
- Vice-governor of the People's Government of Gansu Province, 1989–1990
- Deputy secretary of the CPC Autonomous Prefectural Committee of the Tibet Autonomous Region, 1990–1994
- Vice-minister of Human Resources and Social Security, 1994–2000
- Member of the Central Work Committee of Large Enterprises of the Central Committee of the CPC, 1998–1999
- Minister of Human Resources and Social Security, 2000–2002
- Secretary of the CPC Provincial Committee of Sichuan Province, 2002–2006
- Member of the 16th Central Committee of the CPC, 2002–2007
- Chairman of the Standing Committee of the Provincial People's Congress of Sichuan Province, 2003–2006
- Deputy-director of the 10th Internal and Judicial Affairs Committee of the National People's Congress, 2006

== See also ==
- Politics of China
- Politics of Gansu
- Politics of Sichuan

Political offices
Preceded by Zhou Yongkang	Party Secretary of Sichuan; 2002–2006	Succeeded by Du Qinglin
