= Liu Xingyuan =

Chinese politician (1908–1990)

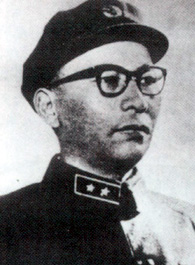
Liu Xingyuan

Liu Xingyuan (Chinese: 刘兴元; October 1908 – August 14, 1990) was a Chinese politician and lieutenant general in the People's Liberation Army. Born in Shandong Province. He was Chinese Communist Party Committee Secretary (March 1972 – October 1975) and governor (March 1972 – October 1975) of Sichuan Province. He was Chinese Communist Party Committee Secretary (December 1970 – March 1972) and governor (June 1969 – March 1972) of Guangdong Province.

Government offices
Preceded by Huang Yongsheng	Governor of Guangdong; 1969–1972	Succeeded by Ding Sheng
Party political offices
Preceded by Huang Yongsheng	Communist Party Chief of Guangdong; 1970–1972	Succeeded by Ding Sheng
