= Li Jingquan =

Chinese politician (1908–1989)

- 李井泉
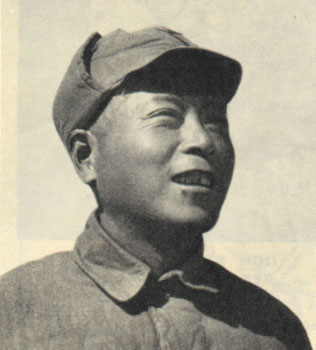

First Secretary of Sichuan
- In office September 1952 – February 1965
- Succeeded by: Liao Zhigao

Personal details
- Born: 1909 Huichang, Jiangxi, China
- Died: 1989 (aged 79–80)
- Party: Chinese Communist Party
- Spouse: Xiao Li
- Children: 5 sons, 2 daughters

Chinese name
- Chinese: 李井泉
Transcriptions
Standard Mandarin
- Hanyu Pinyin: Lǐ Jǐngquán
- Wade–Giles: Li Ching-ch'üan

Li Jingquan (Chinese: 李井泉; Wade–Giles: Li Ching-ch'üan; November 1, 1909 – April 24, 1989) was a Chinese politician and the first Chinese Communist Party Committee Secretary of Sichuan following the establishment of the People's Republic of China in 1949. He supported many of Mao Zedong's policies including the Great Leap Forward.

In 1956, in order to initiate "land reform", Li ordered the execution of some 6000 landlords in the Tibetan areas of Sichuan. Li was responsible for the massive starvation of Chinese citizens in Sichuan and Chongqing during the Great Leap Forward. Li executed around 50,000 "bourgeoisie rightist" Chinese people, around 10% of the rightists persecuted nationwide during the movement.

Ultimately, Li was deemed an enemy of the Chinese Communist Party during the Cultural Revolution, expelled from the party, and imprisoned.

== Early life ==
Li was a born into a landlord peasant Hakka family in Huichang County, southern Jiangxi in 1908. He began studying Marxist theory in his youth, joined the Communist Youth League in 1927, and became a full member of the Chinese Communist Party in 1930.

== Career ==
=== Long March and the Second Sino-Japanese War ===
During the 1930s, Li served as a political commissar in the Red Army, and participated in the Long March. During the Second Sino-Japanese War, Li commanded military actions against the Japanese invasion in the northwest of China, including Inner Mongolia and Shanxi. In 1942, he joined the Counter-Japanese Military University in Yan'an, working under the direction of Lin Biao.

=== Sichuan ===
In 1949, working with He Long, Liu Bocheng, and Zhao Lin, Li commanded his troops to occupy all of Sichuan province. It was then that he met Deng Xiaoping, the secretary of the Southwest Bureau responsible for Sichuan, with whom he had a long working relationship. After the founding of the People's Republic of China, Li became one of the dominant political figures in Sichuan. As in other areas of the Southwest, public security was a major early concern and Mao Zedong praised and rewarded leaders who forcefully approached "anti-bandit" activity and the Campaign to Suppress Counterrevolutionaries.

=== Socialist Transformation and Conflict with Tibetans in Sichuan (1955–1957) ===
In October 1955, Mao Zedong called for an acceleration of agricultural collectivization around China. While Mao had explicitly exempted Tibet from this campaign, he had also left many decisions to local officials and warned them that those who were not able to carry out the cooperatives would simply be replaced. Li advocated enthusiastically the establishment of socialist cooperatives in 1955. This led to friction with Tibetans in the western part of Sichuan province, otherwise known as the Kham region. On his return to Chengdu from Beijing in October 1955, Fan Zhizong, another advocate of the Maoist reforms, warned Li that military preparations were needed in order to anticipate Tibetan resistance to the policy, but Li told him that he would wait until December to make such a decision.

In Chengdu, Li explained to Tibetan representatives that their community would have to take a rapid leap forward into socialism, but failed to translate any of the documents into Tibetan text, leading Tibetan participants in the meeting to describe him as arrogant. Li made a concession to the Tibetan delegates by building them new homes in Chengdu, but they were essentially under house arrest and unable to push back against the policy. Other cadre like Fan Ming had little patience for Tibetan delays, and saw monks and monasteries as particular sources of resistance which would ultimately need to be crushed. As described by the anthropologist and historian Melvyn Goldstein, Li overrode the concerns of the United Front Work Department and the PRC's State Ethnic Affairs Commission who had argued against his proposal for a trial period of land reform in Ganzi, a Tibetan area of western Sichuan, in 1956. Chinese officials gathered together Tibetan peasants to provide "class education" and prepare for land reform and cooperatives, and also attempted to disarm the Khamba Tibetans, many of whom owned rifles. These steps angered local Tibetans and in February 1956, a number of uncoordinated attacks began against Chinese officials and soldiers, reaching most of Ganzi's eighteen counties. The Litang Monastery was a particular site of resistance; the Tibetans there had about a thousand rifles and when Chinese officials demanded they disarm and start land reforms in February 1956, a decision was made by the Tibetans to fight, and some Chinese workers were attacked on March 9, 1956.

Li Jingquan originally responded to the crisis by advocating pulling back all troops, but then sent in two thousand Chinese soldiers into Litang to crush the uprising. Dozens or hundreds of monks and Chinese soldiers were killed in the battle of Litang monastery.

On 21 April 1951, as provincial governor Li Jingquan ordered the execution of 6,000 'landlords' in the ethnic region of western Sichuan to kickstart the land reform campaign.

=== Great Leap Forward (1958–1961) ===
After Mao Zedong launched the Anti-Rightist Movement in 1957, Li became more radical, persecuting more than 50,000 "bourgeoisie rightist" elements, which represented 10% of the rightists persecuted nationwide during the movement. From 1958 to 1961, he participated enthusiastically in the Great Leap Forward movement. Li's radical policies created major food shortages in Sichuan (a province famous for its crop surpluses), particularly the impoverished hilly ethnic regions in the mountains of western Sichuan and Chongqing where most of the people who were starved to death in the province were from, indicated that famine in the province was widespread, leading to the deaths of over 8 million people from starvation, disease or murder during the Great Leap Forward according to official statistics. In 1961, Li was made Chinese Communist Party Committee Secretary of the Southwestern Bureau of China, and retained his position as Party Secretary of Sichuan province.

In March 1958, Li Jingquan welcomed Mao Zedong to Chengdu, accompanying the leader to the Dujiangyan dam on March 21, 1958. Mao's visit to the Hongguang Collective was celebrated in both provincial and national propaganda narratives. Li, however, was dissatisfied with the agricultural results in Pi county where Mao had visited. According to Yang Jisheng's extensive history of the Great Leap Forward in Sichuan, Li Jingquan supported Mao strenuously throughout the campaign, even in periods when Mao's line seemed to be losing momentum.

During the campaign, Li received a large number of county-level documents in Sichuan (then included all areas of Chongqing and parts of Tibetan areas), in particular the impoverished hilly ethnic regions in the mountains of western Sichuan and Chongqing where most of the people who were starved to death in the province were from, indicated that famine in the province was widespread. However, he chose to emphasize that other reasons such as hookworm might be responsible for deaths, downplayed major problems in the pork supplies in Sichuan, and pushed forward with overreporting grain totals even at the times when Mao himself had instructed the Party not to inflate the numbers. Sichuan therefore became one of the worst-hit famine provinces during the Great Leap Forward, with estimates as high as eight to ten million excess deaths.

=== Third Front construction ===
During the Third Front campaign to develop basic industry and national defense industry in China's rugged interior in preparation for potential invasions by the United States or the Soviet Union, Li was appointed in 1964 to lead the Southwest Third Front Preparatory Small Group. This administrative body was established to oversee regional construction and planning. It in turn created an administrative group to handle development in Panzhihua and another to manage the construction of conventional weapons industries around Chongqing.

Li was also appointed Director of the Southwest Railroad Construction Headquarters, a body created in parallel with the Southwest Third Front Preparatory Small Group which handled railroad development during the Third Front.

=== Purged during Cultural Revolution (1966–1976) ===
During the Cultural Revolution, Li was branded an enemy of the CCP, removed of all political and administrative positions, and imprisoned. Posters and Red Guard slogans attacked him as being in a clique with Deng Xiaoping. He was released in 1972 and rehabilitated in 1973.

=== Later life (1977–1989) ===
Following the Cultural Revolution, Li served as a vice-chairman of the Standing Committee of the National People's Congress and as a member of the 10th and 11th Central Committee of the Chinese Communist Party.

Li served on the Central Customs Commission, ultimately requesting to be relieved from this role in September 1985 at the Fourth Plenary Session of the 12th Central Committee of the Chinese Communist Party.

== Personal life ==
In 1941, he married Xiao Li (肖里), with whom he had five sons and two daughters. During the Cultural Revolution, Li was expelled and imprisoned. Meanwhile, Li's wife Xiao Li was tortured and committed suicide. Li's son, a student at the Beijing Institute of Aeronautics and Astronautics was also killed by Red Guards.
