= Du Qinglin =

Chinese politician (born 1946)

- 杜青林
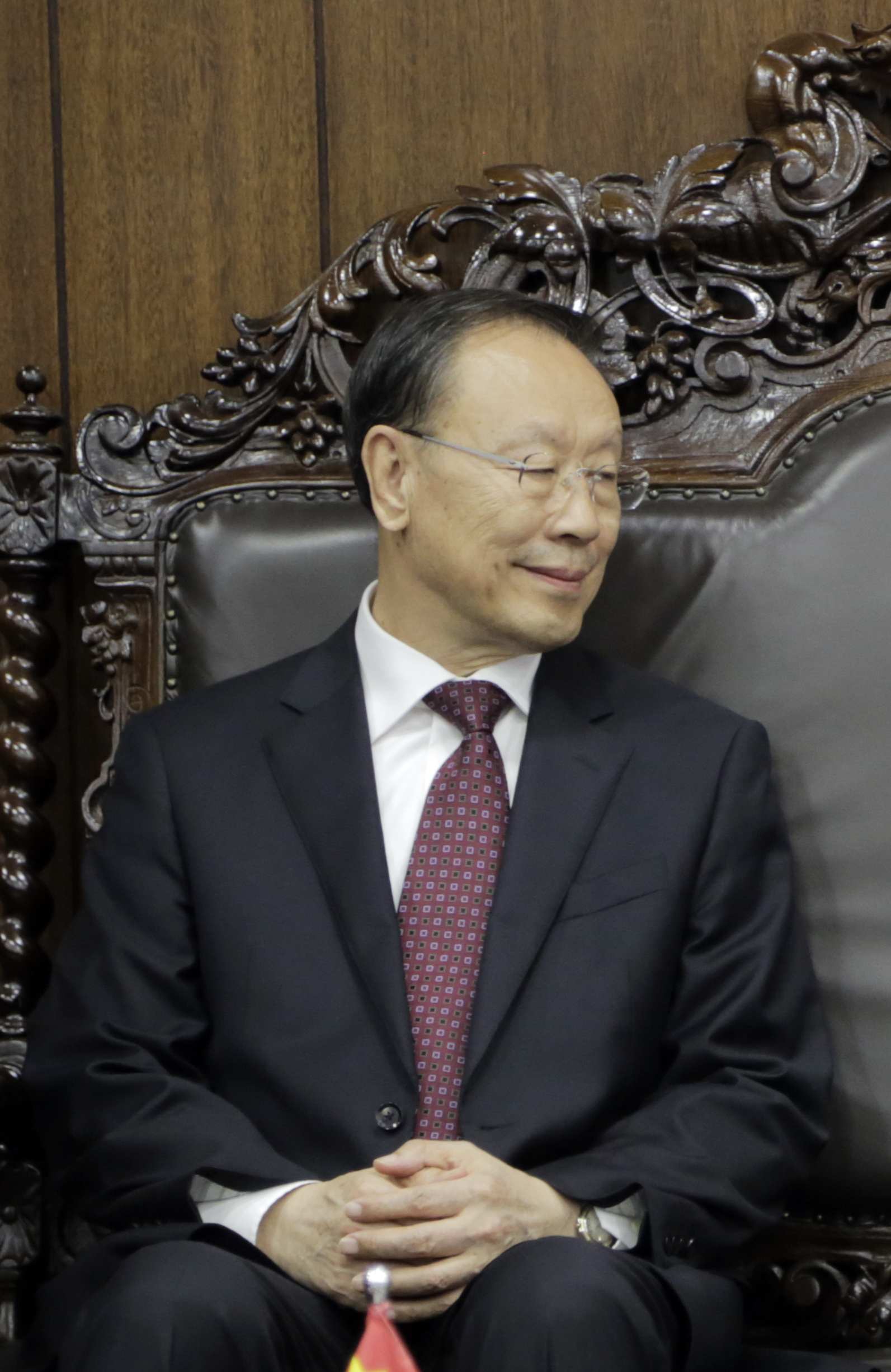

Vice Chairman of the Chinese People's Political Consultative Conference
- In office 13 March 2008 – 14 March 2018
- Chairman: Jia Qinglin; Yu Zhengsheng

Head of the United Front Work Department
- In office 2 December 2007 – 31 August 2012
- General Secretary: Hu Jintao
- Preceded by: Liu Yandong
- Succeeded by: Ling Jihua

Party Secretary of Sichuan
- In office 3 December 2006 – 2 December 2007
- Deputy: Jiang Jufeng (Governor)
- Preceded by: Zhang Xuezhong
- Succeeded by: Liu Qibao

Minister of Agriculture
- In office 31 August 2001 – 29 December 2006
- Preceded by: Chen Yaobang
- Succeeded by: Sun Zhengcai

Party Secretary of Hainan
- In office 19 February 1998 – 15 August 2001
- Preceded by: Ruan Chongwu
- Succeeded by: Bai Keming

Personal details
- Born: November 1946 (age 79) Panshi, Jilin, China
- Party: Chinese Communist Party
- Education: Northeast Normal University
- Occupation: Politician

Du Qinglin (Note: Chinese: 杜青林; pinyin: Dù Qīnglín) (born November 1946 in Panshi, Jilin City, Jilin) is a politician of the People's Republic of China. He formerly served as vice chairman of Chinese People's Political Consultative Conference (CPPCC), and a Secretary of the Secretariat of the Chinese Communist Party (CCP). From 2007 and 2012 he served as the head of the United Front Work Department of CCP Central Committee.

== Biography ==
Du graduated from law department of Jilin University with a master's degree. He joined the CCP in March 1966.

In early years, Du served in FAW Car Co., Ltd in Changchun and Communist Youth League Jilin committee. From September 1984 to 1991, he served as vice secretary of CCP Changchun municipal committee, a standing committee member of CCP Jilin committee, director of organization department in Jilin, and vice secretary of CCP Jilin committee. In March 1992, Du became the CCP Deputy Committee Secretary of Hainan. He was elected the chairman of Hainan People's Congress in February 1993. From February 1998 to August 2001, Du was the CCP Committee Secretary of Hainan. From August 2001 to December 2006, Du served as Minister of Agriculture. In December 2006, he became the CCP Committee Secretary of Sichuan, and was elected chairman of Sichuan People's Congress in January 2007. In December 2007, Du succeeded Liu Yandong as the director of United Front Work Department of CCP Central Committee.

On March 13, 2008, Du was elected vice chairman of CPPCC. In November 2012, he was elected to the Secretariat of the Chinese Communist Party, while continuing his term as Vice Chairman of the CPPCC.

Du was a member of the 15th, 16th, 17th, and 18th Central Committee of the Chinese Communist Party.

== Notes ==
Government offices
Preceded by Chen Yaobang	Minister of Agriculture; 2001–2006	Succeeded by Sun Zhengcai
Party political offices
Preceded by Ruan Chongwu	Party Secretary of Hainan; 1998–2001	Succeeded by Bai Keming
Preceded by Zhang Xuezhong	Party Secretary of Sichuan; 2006–2007	Succeeded by Liu Qibao
