= Xie Shijie =

Chinese politician

- 谢世杰

Party Secretary of Sichuan
- In office March 1993 – January 2000
- Preceded by: Yang Rudai
- Succeeded by: Zhou Yongkang

Personal details
- Born: September 1934 (age 91) Liangping, Sichuan, China
- Party: Chinese Communist Party
- Education: Southwest Agricultural College

Xie Shijie (Chinese: 谢世杰; born September 1934) is a retired politician of the People's Republic of China. He served as the Party Secretary of Sichuan from 1993 to 2000.

== Biography ==
Xie Shijie was born in September 1934 in Liangshan County, Sichuan province (now part of Chongqing municipality). From 1951 to 1958 he worked at the agricultural department of Xikang province, and joined the Chinese Communist Party in December 1954.

From 1958 to 1959 Xie studied at the Southwest Agricultural College (now part of Southwest University), and worked as Director of Ya'an Agricultural School from 1959 to 1971. In 1971 he joined the prefectural government of Ya'an. From 1975 to 1980 he served as the Communist Party Chief of Yingjing County, Ya'an. In 1980 he became the Deputy Party Chief of Ya'an prefecture, and was promoted to Party Chief in 1983. He was promoted to the Sichuan provincial government in 1985, serving as Vice Governor until 1992. In March 1993 he succeeded Yang Rudai as Communist Party Chief of Sichuan, serving until January 2000.

Xie was a member of the 14th and 15th Central Committees of the CCP.

Party political offices
Preceded by Yang Rudai	Party Secretary of Sichuan; March 1993 – January 2000	Succeeded by Zhou Yongkang
