= Wang Dongming =

Chinese politician

- 王东明
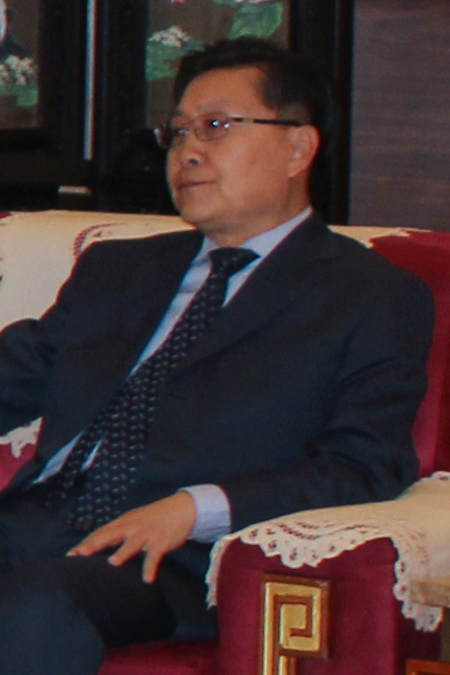
- Wang Dongming in 2018

Vice Chairman of the Standing Committee of the National People's Congress
- Incumbent
- Assumed office 17 March 2018
- Chairman: Li Zhanshu; Zhao Leji

Chairman of the All-China Federation of Trade Unions
- Incumbent
- Assumed office 22 March 2018
- Preceded by: Li Jianguo

Party Secretary of Sichuan
- In office 21 November 2012 – 21 March 2018
- Deputy: Wei Hong (Governor); Yin Li
- Preceded by: Liu Qibao
- Succeeded by: Peng Qinghua

Chairman of the Sichuan Provincial People's Congress
- In office 29 January 2013 – 10 January 2019
- Preceded by: Liu Qibao
- Succeeded by: Peng Qinghua

Personal details
- Born: July 1956 (age 70) Benxi, Liaoning
- Party: Chinese Communist Party
- Education: Liaoning University

Wang Dongming (Chinese: 王东明; pinyin: Wáng Dōngmíng; born July 1956) is a Chinese politician who has served since 2018 as the Vice Chairperson of the Standing Committee of the National People's Congress and the Chairman of the All-China Federation of Trade Unions. Originally from Liaoning province, Wang served as the chief of the General Office of the Central Institutional Organization Commission between 2007 and 2012, and the Party Secretary of Sichuan between 2012 and 2018.

== Career ==
Wang was born in Benxi, Liaoning province in 1956. He took part in rural manual labour in Huanren County, Liaoning in the latter stages of the Cultural Revolution. After the Cultural Revolution ended, he obtained a degree in philosophy at Liaoning University, then went to the city of Jinzhou to serve as local Communist Youth League chief. He then served as party chief of Suizhong County and then Dengta County, then vice mayor of Liaoyang.

He obtained a postgraduate degree at the Chinese Communist Party (CCP) Central Party School. In 1997, Wang became a member of the Liaoning provincial Party Standing Committee, and also served concurrently as the head of the organization department of Liaoning. In September 2002, he became the deputy director of the Organization Department of the Chinese Communist Party (vice-minister rank) and the director of the No. 2 Cadres department.

=== Sichuan ===
In July 2007, Wang was appointed the chief of General Office of the Central Institutional Organization Commission, in charge of institutional reforms, holding the rank of a minister; he stayed in the role until 2012, when he was transferred to become party chief of Sichuan, succeeding Liu Qibao. Sichuan was known to be a power base of the former security chief Zhou Yongkang. Wang assisted party disciplinary authorities as political allies of Zhou were investigated and sacked. Wang accompanied Xi Jinping on his 2015 visit to the United States.

=== National People's Congress ===
In March 2018, Wang was elected as the Vice Chairperson of the Standing Committee of the National People's Congress. Later he was appointed the Chairman of the All-China Federation of Trade Unions.

He was a standing committee member of the 10th Chinese People's Political Consultative Conference (CPPCC), and a member of the 17th, 18th, and 19th Central Committees of the Chinese Communist Party.

On 7 December 2020, pursuant to Executive Order 13936, the US Department of the Treasury imposed sanctions on all 14 Vice Chairpersons of the National People's Congress, including Wang, for "undermining Hong Kong's autonomy and restricting the freedom of expression or assembly."

On March 10, 2023, during the 14th National People's Congress, he was appointed Vice Chairman of the Standing Committee of the National People's Congress.
