= Du Xinyuan =

Chinese politician

Du Xinyuan (Chinese: 杜心源) (1905–1985), birth name Du Chunren (Chinese: 杜春仁), was a Chinese politician. He was born in Wutai County, Xinzhou, Shanxi Province. He joined the Chinese Communist Party in 1927, while studying at Beijing Normal University. He was CPPCC Committee Chairman of Sichuan Province. He was a delegate to the 4th, 5th and 6th National People's Congress.

Preceded by Liao Zhigao	CPPCC Committee Chairman of Sichuan	Succeeded by Ren Baige
