= Peng Qinghua =

Chinese politician

- 彭清华
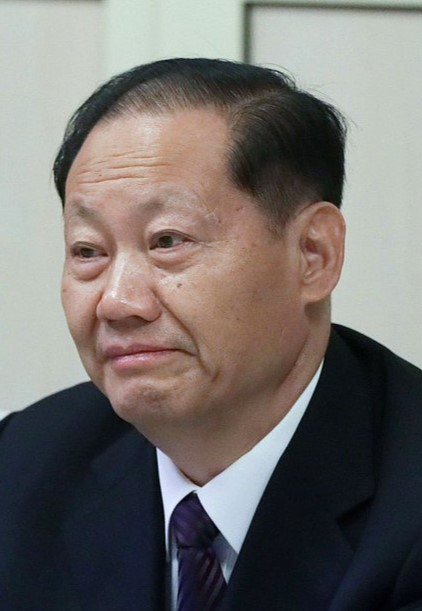
- Peng in 2024

Vice Chairman of the Standing Committee of the National People's Congress
- Incumbent
- Assumed office 10 March 2023
- Chairman: Zhao Leji

Party Secretary of Sichuan
- In office 21 March 2018 – 22 April 2022
- Deputy: Huang Qiang (Governor); Yin Li (Governor)
- Preceded by: Wang Dongming
- Succeeded by: Wang Xiaohui

Party Secretary of Guangxi
- In office 19 December 2012 – 21 March 2018
- Deputy: Chen Wu
- Preceded by: Guo Shengkun
- Succeeded by: Lu Xinshe

Director of the Liaison Office of the Central People's Government in Hong Kong
- In office 25 May 2009 – 18 December 2012
- Preceded by: Gao Siren
- Succeeded by: Zhang Xiaoming

Personal details
- Born: April 1957 (age 69) Daye County, Hubei
- Party: Chinese Communist Party
- Education: Peking University; Hunan University; Sun Yat-sen University
- Occupation: Politician

- Traditional Chinese: 彭清華
- Simplified Chinese: 彭清华
Transcriptions
Standard Mandarin
- Hanyu Pinyin: Péng Qīnghuá

Peng Qinghua (born April 1957) is a Chinese politician who is currently a vice chairperson of the Standing Committee of the National People's Congress. He served as Party Secretary of Sichuan from March 2018 to April 2022, and was formerly the director of the Hong Kong Liaison Office from 2009 to 2012 and the Party Secretary of Guangxi from 2012 to 2018.

== Career ==
Born in Daye County, Hubei, Peng started working in August 1974. He is a member of the Chinese Communist Party (CCP) and has attained a doctorate and the rank of researcher. During the 1970s, he served in various posts in his home county. In 1979, he entered the department of philosophy of Peking University. Beginning in 1983, he served in the Organization Department of the Central Committee of the Chinese Communist Party. In 1988, he became a secretary of the CCP Organization Department and the vice director and later, director of the CCP Party Development Research Institute. He also served as editor-in-chief of "Party Development Research", and director of the research office of the CCP Organization Department. From 1993 to 1996, he pursued a master's degree at the international business school of Hunan University. From 1996 to 2001, he studied at the management school of Sun Yat-sen University and obtained a doctorate. In 2001, he was appointed director of the first cadres bureau and department committee member of the CCP Organization Department.

From December 2003, he served as vice director of the Liaison Office of the Central People's Government in the Hong Kong Special Administrative Region. Between May 2009 and 2012, he was Director of the Office.

In 2013, Peng was appointed the Party Secretary of Guangxi. He was appointed the Party Secretary of Sichuan in March 2018.

Peng is a member of the 17th, 18th, and 19th Central Committees of the Chinese Communist Party.

=== National People's Congress ===
On March 10, 2023, during the 14th National People's Congress, he was appointed Vice Chairman of the Standing Committee of the National People's Congress. On July 30, 2024, at the behest of the Government of Iran, Peng Qinghua, special envoy of President Xi Jinping and vice-chairman of the Standing Committee of the National People's Congress, participates in the inauguration ceremony of Iran's new president, Masoud Pezeshkian, in Tehran. On July 31, Pezeshkian convenes with Peng at the presidential palace.

Political offices
| Preceded by Wang Dongming | Party Secretary of Sichuan; 2018－2022 | Succeeded by Wang Xiaohui |
| Preceded by Guo Shengkun | Party Secretary of Guangxi; 2012－2018 | Succeeded by Lu Xinshe |
| Preceded by Gao Siren | Director of Liaison Office of the Central People's Government in Hong Kong; 2009－2012 | Succeeded by Zhang Xiaoming |
