= Chongqing Municipal People's Government =

Local administrative agency of Chongqing, China

Chongqing Municipal People's Government 重庆市人民政府

Leadership
- Mayor: Hu Henghua since 30 December 2021
- Executive Deputy Mayor: Chen Xinwu
- Deputy Mayors: Zheng Xiangdong, Dan Yanzheng, Jiang Duntao, Shang Kui
- Secretary-general: Zhang Guozhi
- Parent body: Central People's Government; Chongqing Municipal People's Congress
- Elected by: Chongqing Municipal People's Congress

Meeting place
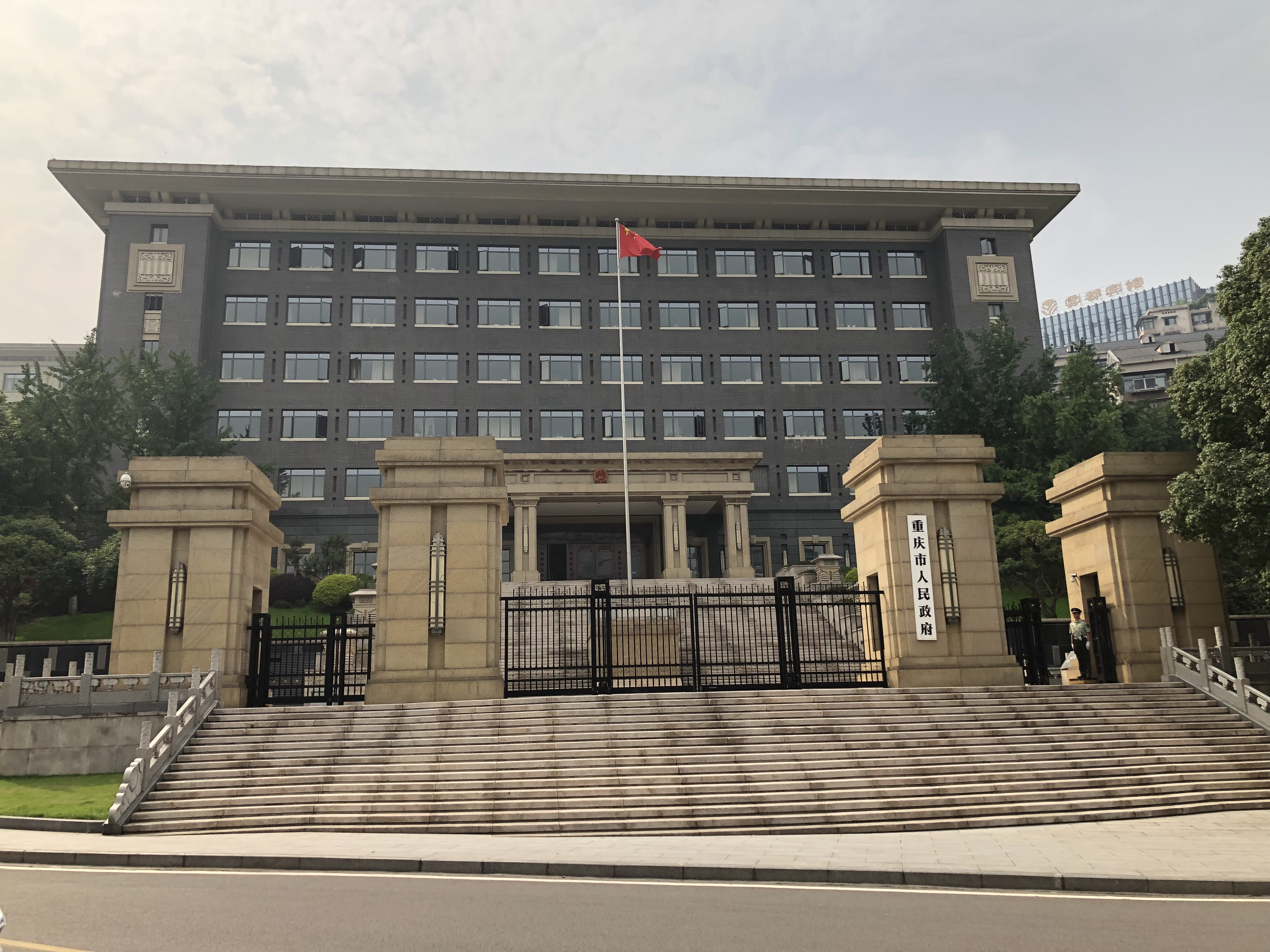
- Headquarters

Website
- en.cq.gov.cn

The Chongqing Municipal People's Government is the local administrative agency of Chongqing. It is officially elected by the Chongqing Municipal People's Congress and is formally responsible to the CMPC and its Standing Committee. The municipal government is headed by a mayor, currently Hu Henghua. Under the country's one-party system, the mayor is subordinate to the secretary of the Chongqing Municipal Committee of the Chinese Communist Party.

== History ==
The Chongqing Municipal People's Government was established in December 1949. In February 1955, it was renamed the Chongqing Municipal People's Committee. In June 1968, during the Cultural Revolution, it was replaced by the Chongqing Revolutionary Committee. It was re-established in March 1980.

== Organization ==
The organization of the Chongqing Municipal People's Government includes:

- General Office of the Chongqing Municipal People's Government
- Research Office of the Chongqing Municipal People's Government

=== Component Departments ===
- Chongqing Municipal Development and Reform Commission
- Chongqing Municipal Education Commission
- Chongqing Municipal Science and Technology Bureau
- Chongqing Municipal Economic and Information Commission
- Chongqing Municipal Ethnic and Religious Affairs Commission
- Chongqing Public Security Bureau
- Chongqing Civil Affairs Bureau
- Chongqing Municipal Justice Bureau
- Chongqing Municipal Finance Bureau
- Chongqing Municipal Human Resources and Social Security Bureau
- Chongqing Municipal Planning and Natural Resources Bureau
- Chongqing Municipal Ecological Environment Bureau
- Chongqing Municipal Housing and Urban-Rural Development Committee
- Chongqing Municipal Urban Management Bureau
- Chongqing Transportation Bureau
- Chongqing Water Conservancy Bureau
- Chongqing Municipal Agriculture and Rural Affairs Commission
- Chongqing Municipal Commission of Commerce
- Chongqing Municipal Culture and Tourism Development Committee
- Chongqing Municipal Health Commission
- Chongqing Veterans Affairs Bureau
- Chongqing Emergency Management Bureau
- Chongqing Audit Bureau
- Chongqing Municipal People's Government Foreign Affairs and Overseas Chinese Affairs Office

=== Directly affiliated special institutions ===
- State-owned Assets Supervision and Administration Commission of Beijing Municipal People's Government

=== Organizations under the Municipal Government ===
- Chongqing Municipal People's Government Cultural and Historical Research Institute
- Chongqing Academy of Social Sciences
- Chongqing Academy of Science and Technology
- Chongqing Academy of Agricultural Sciences
- Chongqing Academy of Animal Science
- Chongqing Fisheries Science Research Institute
- Chongqing Sericulture Science and Technology Research Institute
- Chongqing Sericulture Administration Center
- Chongqing Geological and Mineral Exploration and Development Bureau
- Chongqing Institute of Geology and Mineral Resources
- Chongqing Land Reserve and Remediation Center
- Chongqing 136 Geological Team
- Chongqing Veteran Cadre Rest Home
- Chongqing Energy Testing and Utilization Center
- Chongqing Industrial Design Promotion Center
- Chongqing Grain and Oil Quality Supervision and Inspection Center
- Chongqing Supply and Marketing Cooperative
- Chongqing Broadcasting Group

== Leadership ==
Name	Office	Party	Date of birth	Other offices	Ref.
Hu Henghua	Mayor Secretary of the Municipal Government Party Leading Group	CCP	June 1963 (age 62)	Deputy Secretary of the Party Beijing Municipal Committee Member of the CCP Central Committee	
Chen Xinwu	Executive Deputy Mayor Deputy Secretary of the Party Leading Group	CCP	July 1968 (age 57)	Secretary of the Municipal Party Committee's Directly Affiliated Organs Working Committee Director of the General Office of Chongqing Municipal Party Committee Director of the Municipal Party Committee's Reform Office	
Zheng Xiangdong	Deputy Mayor Member of the Party Leading Group	CCP	October 1968 (age 57)		
Jin Wei	Deputy Mayor	CCP	May 1972 (age 53–54)	Vice Chairman of the China Democratic League Chairman of the CDL Chongqing Municipal Committee	
Tan Xuxiang	Deputy Mayor Member of the Party Leading Group	CDL	May 1966 (age 59–60)	Secretary of the Party Working Committee of the Urban Sub-Center Director of the Management Committee	
Jiang Duntao	Deputy Mayor Member of the Party Leading Group	CCP	May 1969 (age 56–57)		
Shang Kui	Deputy Mayor Member of the Party Leading Group	CCP	June 1968 (age 57)		
Zhang Guozhi	Deputy Mayor Member of the Party Leading Group	CCP	June 1973 (age 52)		
Luo Qingquan	Secretary-General Member of the Party Leading Group	CCP	January 1967 (age 59)	Director of the General Office of the Municipal Government Director of the Municipal Government Advisory Office	

=== Previous leaderships ===
1st Municipal People's Government (June 1997–December 2002)

- Mayor: Pu Haiqing (until June 1999), Bao Xuding (acting from June 1999 to January 2000, and in office from January 2000 to October 2002), Wang Hongju (acting since October 2002)
- Deputy Mayors: Wang Hongju, Gan Yuping (until June 1998), Xu Zhongmin, Li Deshui (until November 1999), Chen Guangguo, Wu Jianong, Cheng Yiju, Bao Xuding (until January 2000), Chen Jiwa (since January 2000), Zhao Gongqing (since January 2000), Huang Qifan (since October 2001)

2nd Municipal People's Government (January 2003–December 2007)

- Mayor: Wang Hongju
- Deputy Mayors: Chen Guangguo (until January 2007), Wu Jianong, Chen Jiwa (until September 2003), Zhao Gongqing (until December 2005), Huang Qifan, Yu Yuanmu, Tong Xiaoping, Xie Xiaojun, Zhou Mubing (since March 2004), Tan Qiwei (since April 2006), Ma Zhengqi (since January 2007)
- Secretary-general: Zhou Mubing (February 2003–April 2004), Chen Heping (from May 2004)

3rd Municipal People's Government (January 2008–January 2013)

- Mayor: Wang Hongju (until December 2009), Huang Qifan (acting from December 2009 to January 2010, in office since January 2010)
- Deputy Mayors: Huang Qifan (until January 2010), Ma Zhengqi, Tong Xiaoping, Xie Xiaojun (until January 2011), Zhou Mubing (until April 2010), Tan Qiwei, Liu Xuepu (until August 2012), Ling Yueming, Wu Gang (since February 2011), Wang Lijun (May 2011–March 2012), He Ting (since March 2012), Zhang Ming (since August 2012), Chen Heping (since August 2012), Liu Qiang (since August 2012
- Secretary-general: Chen Heping (until November 2012), Ou Shunqing (since November 2012)

4th Municipal People's Government (January 2013–January 2018)

- Mayor: Huang Qifan (until December 2016), Zhang Guoqing (acting from December 2016 to January 2017, and in office from January to December 2017)
- Deputy Mayors: Ma Zhengqi (until April 2013), Ling Yueming (until June 2013), He Ting (until June 2017), Wu Gang (until December 2016), Zhang Ming (until February 2015), Chen Heping (until June 2016), Liu Qiang, Tan Jialing, Zhang Guoqing (April 2013–January 2017), Liu Wei (since November 2013), Liu Guiping (since June 2016), Qu Qian (since December 2016), Wu Cunrong (since March 2017
- Secretary-general: Ou Shunqing

5th Municipal People's Government (January 2018–January 2023)

- Mayor: Tang Liangzhi (until December 2021), Hu Henghua (from December 2021)
- Deputy Mayors: Wu Cunrong (until January 2021), Lu Kehua, Liu Guiping (until May 2019), Qu Qian (until January 2021), Deng Huilin (until June 2020), Pan Yiqun (until November 2019), Li Dianxun (until May 2019), Li Mingqing (until July 2021; February–June 2022), Xiong Xue (from May 2019), Li Bo (September 2019–March 2021), Zheng Xiangdong (from April 2020), Hu Minglang (from September 2020), Wang Fu (from March to December 2021), Cai Yunge (March 2021–June 2022), Chen Jinshan (July 2021–August 2022), Dan Yanzheng (from February 2022), Chen Mingbo (from June 2022), and Dong Jianguo (August 2022–January 2023
- Secretary-general: Ou Shunqing

6th Municipal People's Government (January 2023–)

- Mayor: Hu Henghua
- Deputy Mayors: Chen Xinwu, Chen Mingbo, Hu Minglang, Zheng Xiangdong, Dan Yanzheng, Jiang Duntao, Shang Kui, Zhang Anjiang, Zhang Guozhi
- Secretary-general: Luo Qingquan
