= Wang Lijun =

Chinese former police chief (born 1959)

Vice Mayor of Chongqing
- In office May 27, 2011 – March 23, 2012
- Party Secretary: Bo Xilai
- Mayor: Wang Hongju; Huang Qifan

Personal details
- Born: 26 December 1959 (age 66) Arxan, Inner Mongolia, China
- Party: Chinese Communist Party (until 2012)
- Education: People's Public Security University of China
- Occupation: Chongqing police chief; Tieling police chief
- Known for: Chongqing gang trials, Wang Lijun incident

Chinese name
- Simplified Chinese: 王立军
- Traditional Chinese: 王立軍
Transcriptions
Standard Mandarin
- Hanyu Pinyin: Wáng Lìjūn
- Gwoyeu Romatzyh: Wang Lihjiun
- Wade–Giles: Wang^{2} Li^{4}-chün^{1}
- IPA: [wǎŋ lîtɕwə́n]

Mongolian name
- Mongolian script: ᠦᠨᠡᠨᠪᠠᠭᠠᠲᠤᠷ
Transcriptions
- SASM/GNC: Ünenbaɡatur

Wang Lijun (born 26 December 1959) is a Chinese former police chief. He served as vice-mayor and police chief of the megacity of Chongqing. Wang is ethnically Mongol and was born in Arxan, Inner Mongolia. Prior to taking on positions in Chongqing, Wang served as vice-mayor and police chief of Jinzhou, Liaoning, and the police chief of Tieling, Liaoning.

Wang rose to prominence in Liaoning where he gained a reputation for carrying out effective campaigns against organized crime. He became a close associate of prominent politician Bo Xilai, initially working for Bo in Liaoning province, then taking up the police chief post in Chongqing once Bo became the Chinese Communist Party Committee Secretary there. In Chongqing, Wang was known for his role as a political fixer for Bo Xilai, in addition to carrying out the Chongqing gang trials, which gained significant media coverage.

In March 2012, Wang, feeling threatened after having fallen out with Bo, abruptly appeared at the U.S. consulate in Chengdu in what became known as the Wang Lijun incident, setting off a sensational and protracted political scandal that brought down himself and Bo Xilai. In September 2012, Wang was convicted on charges of abuse of power, bribery, and defection, and sentenced to fifteen years in prison. He also testified against Bo Xilai at Bo's trial.

== Early life ==
Wang was born on 26 December 1959, the son of Wang Yin, a railway construction worker of Mongol descent, and Liang Shuxia, a textile worker, who was Han Chinese. He attended No. 1 Middle School in Hailar (now part of the city of Hulunbuir), Inner Mongolia. While in middle school, Wang was an avid boxer. After completing school, he was sent to the countryside to perform manual labour in rural Arxan.

In April 1978, Wang joined the People's Liberation Army and worked as a driver and document handler to support the construction of a coal mine in the town of Tiefa. His unit was based out of the Diaobingshan area, a suburb of Tieling. In March 1981, Wang returned to his hometown of Arxan and took up a job as a factory worker on a forestry cooperative. In December 1982, he followed his fiancée, Xiao Suli, to a state-owned food processing company and worked as a driver.

== Police career in Liaoning ==
In August 1984, he joined the traffic police division of the department of public security in the city of Tieling, in Liaoning province. It was said that Wang was seen as unfit to serve since he did not have any schooling in policing, but was recommended to join the force on the advice of an official he had worked for at the coal mine construction project. After joining the force, Wang was soon promoted to lead a team of twenty security personnel. He eventually became the deputy head, then head, of a local police station. His work in reducing crime earned him national-level accolades. He went back to school in 1991 to complete professional training at the People's Public Security University of China, a policing school.

In June 1994, Wang was appointed deputy police commissioner in Tieling, and was noted for his campaigns to crack down on corruption and criminal gangs. It was said that Wang had sustained serious injuries as a result of explosives placed near his office, and was in a coma for some twenty days. Over the span of two years, Wang cracked down hard on gangs, arresting gang boss and former provincial boxing champion Yang Fu along with nearly a dozen other gang leaders. In August 2000, he was promoted to become police chief of Tieling.

During his tenure in Tieling, Wang was allegedly involved in a local corruption scandal. Details surrounding the case are unclear, though there is speculation that Wang may have been implicated in corruption. Wang's successor as director of the Tieling public security department, Gu Fengjie, has reportedly been detained pending investigation on corruption charges.

Wang continued his gang-busting streak in Tieling, and was commissioned by the authorities to take his zero-tolerance attitudes to Panjin. Wang conducted massive raids on criminal organizations. A five-million-yuan bounty was placed on his head by various local criminal gangs. Wang gained further recognition for his work, and was awarded a national medal by the national police chief Jia Chunwang. In 2003 Wang was transferred to the city of Jinzhou to serve as police chief.

== Transfer to Chongqing ==
Wang became an associate of Bo Xilai while Bo served as governor of Liaoning. Bo, the son of Communist veteran Bo Yibo, was seen as a rising political star destined for higher office. Bo served as Minister of Commerce, and, by 2007, earned a seat on the 25-member Politburo of the Chinese Communist Party, and also assumed the post of party chief in the interior megacity of Chongqing. Bo's ambitions for higher office was well known in Chinese political circles.

In June 2008, Wang Lijun was appointed as the police chief of Chongqing and began serving as a right-hand man to Bo Xilai. On 10 July 2009, Bo launched a protracted campaign against gangs, with Wang as his top enforcer and chief implementer. Wang played a central role in the "strike-hard" campaigns in Chongqing, which saw 1,544 suspects arrested in what may have been the largest crackdown of its kind. Close to 6,000 people, amongst whom were wealthy businessmen, government advisers, crime bosses and senior police officers have been arrested in Wang's anti-crime campaigns since 2009. The South China Morning Post reported that local crime bosses had once placed a ¥6 million bounty on Wang's head.

Wang's success in combating crime eventually resulted in his appointment to the National People's Congress (NPC). Wang's anecdotes appeared as anti-corruption and anti-crime propaganda in documentaries in print and television media and elsewhere; he played a leading role in many of the shows. Hailed as an anti-triad hero for busting crime in Liaoning, Wang's bravery in confronting gangs became subject of a television drama, Iron-Blooded Police Spirits（铁血警魂）.

=== Demotion ===
On 2 February 2012, Wang was abruptly reassigned "to a post overseeing municipal education, science, and environmental affairs", regarded as a less prestigious post than his former public security office. Although details on the demotion are sparse, observers have speculated that Wang fell out of favor with Bo after Wang came under scrutiny by the Commission for Discipline Inspection for his possible involvement in the Tieling corruption case. In order to make a deal for himself with the commission, Wang may have sought leniency in exchange for information on corruption and embezzlement by Bo Xilai and/or his wife. Bo is speculated to have learned about Wang's accusations, and ordered the arrest of several individuals closest to Wang. Wang's fears of retribution by Bo Xilai may have led him to seek refuge at the American consulate in Chengdu. In interviews with Southern Weekly and Chongqing Daily following announcement of his "stress leave", Wang said: "It is just a normal reshuffle." He refused to engage on online speculation for his job change. The report was published on its website on Wednesday but was removed a few hours later.

== U.S. consulate incident ==
On 6 February 2012, Wang traveled to the U.S. consulate in Chengdu. Following a meeting with U.S. consular officials, Wang reportedly "left of his own volition". The Chinese Ministry of Foreign Affairs acknowledged on 9 February 2012 Wang's visit to the U.S. Consulate, and said that the matter was "under investigation".

The U.S. Department of State did not comment on the content of the meeting, though observers speculated that Wang may have been seeking political asylum or at a minimum was seeking to extricate himself from the reach of Bo Xilai, who had already allegedly detained several of Wang's subordinates. Overseas Chinese-language websites such as Boxun alleged that Wang brought evidence incriminating Bo Xilai to the meeting at the consulate. While Wang was in the consulate, the building was encircled by police. The Department of State refused to comment on speculations Wang sought to defect to the United States.

Following his departure from the consulate, Wang was immediately seized by security agents. Reports indicate he then flew to Beijing, possibly in the company of Qiu Jin, vice minister of the Ministry of State Security.

On 9 February, several overseas Chinese-language websites posted an open letter allegedly written by Wang. The letter accused Bo Xilai of corruption and harboring criminal connections and called him "the greatest gangster in China", and also complained that Bo treats his subordinates like "chewing gum", i.e. that they were to be disposed of when they wear out. The websites claimed Wang secretly sent the letter to his overseas friends prior to his unexpected leave, and he entered the U.S. Consulate in order to ask the latter to hold documents incriminating Bo.

Shortly after Wang's meeting at the U.S. consulate, Chongqing municipal government information offices stated that Wang was "seriously indisposed due to long term overwork and intense mental stress." They continued, "Currently he has been authorized to undergo vacation-style medical treatment."

In early March 2012, Chinese leader Hu Jintao reportedly denounced Wang as a traitor to the CCP and the nation in an internal briefing relayed to members of the Chinese People's Political Consultative Conference. The Xinhua News Agency reported in June 2012 that Wang had resigned as a deputy to the NPC.

== Trial and sentencing ==
In September 2012, Wang was charged with and convicted of abuse of power, bribe taking, defection, and "bending the law for selfish ends." His trial took place in the city of Chengdu where he had fled during the incident at the U.S. consulate. The prosecution accused Wang of taking bribes worth some $450,000 from millionaire Dalian businessman Xu Ming in exchange for releasing three people from police custody, and taking approximately $32,000 for the rental of his vacation home in Chongqing from another businessman in exchange for releasing a suspect. Wang's legal team disputed the bribery charges, stating that it was in fact Gu Kailai who arranged for the transactions and that Wang did not personally perform any of the favours. Wang was found guilty on all four charges and sentenced to 15 years in prison.

Wang fared better compared to his erstwhile associates in the Bo family whose scandal he had exposed; Gu Kailai received a death sentence with a two-year reprieve for the murder of Neil Heywood, and Bo Xilai himself was sentenced to life in prison for corruption and other charges. All three trials were widely publicized and closely followed by international media.

Since the trial, Wang has been interned at Qincheng Prison. According to the South China Morning Post in 2019, "Wang always likes doing Chinese calligraphy. He also reads a lot in prison and spends his time studying English".

== Corruption allegations ==
In March 2012, allegations began emerging from spurned businessmen of corruption, torture, and intimidation by top-level officials in Chongqing.

Li Jun, a fugitive businessman from Chongqing, told the Financial Times that Chongqing security forces seized his $700 million real estate business and tortured him as retaliation for attempting to purchase land that was also sought by the government. When he refused to give up the land to the government, Li became a target of Bo Xilai's 2009 anti-corruption campaign. He claims he was abducted, tortured on a "tiger bench" and shocked with electric batons, and that officials sought to charge him with "bribery, gun-running, pimping, usury and supporting illegal religious organizations". Li's allegations could not be independently verified, and he currently lives in hiding abroad.

Chongqing real estate developer and member of Chongqing's People's Congress, Zhang Mingyu, was arrested in Beijing after writing in his microblog that he had evidence of ties between top-level Chongqing officials and the mafia. Prior to his arrest, Zhang wrote on his blog that a high-level Chongqing official, Zhui Zhengkuan, committed suicide in early March. According to Zhang, the official was a close associate of city crime boss Weng Zhenjie. Weng Zhenjie—who was not targeted during the city's highly publicized crackdowns on organized crime—is also reportedly close to the city's mayor.

Zhang Mingyu was a business rival of Weng Zhenjie in Chongqing. Zhang claimed to have a tape recording in which Wang Lijun threatened him to stop making charges against Weng. On 7 March, Zhang was taken from his Beijing home by three officers, including Chongqing's deputy police chief, who had disguised themselves as maintenance workers.

== See also ==
- Politics of Chongqing
- Wu Changshun, former police chief of Tianjin
- He Ting, Wang's successor as police chief of Chongqing
