= Sun Zhengcai =

Chinese politician (born 1963)

- 孙政才
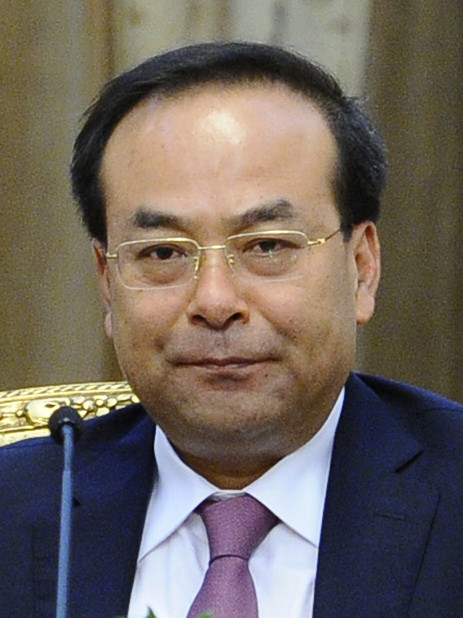

Party Secretary of Chongqing
- In office 20 November 2012 – 14 July 2017
- Deputy: Huang Qifan→Zhang Guoqing (mayor); Zhang Guoqing→Tang Liangzhi (zhuanzhi)
- Preceded by: Zhang Dejiang
- Succeeded by: Chen Min'er

Party Secretary of Jilin
- In office 30 November 2009 – 20 November 2012
- Preceded by: Wang Min
- Succeeded by: Wang Rulin

Minister of Agriculture
- In office 29 December 2006 – 26 December 2009
- Premier: Wen Jiabao
- Preceded by: Du Qinglin
- Succeeded by: Han Changfu

Personal details
- Born: September 25, 1963 (age 63) Rongcheng, Shandong, China
- Party: Chinese Communist Party (expelled)
- Education: Qingdao Agricultural University; China Agricultural University

Sun Zhengcai
- Simplified Chinese: 孙政才
- Traditional Chinese: 孫政才
Transcriptions
Standard Mandarin
- Hanyu Pinyin: Sūn Zhèngcái
- IPA: [swə́n ʈʂə̂ŋ.tsʰǎɪ]

Sun Zhengcai (Chinese: 孙政才; born September 25, 1963) is a former Chinese politician and senior regional official. From 2012 to 2017, Sun served as the Party Secretary of Chongqing, an interior municipality, and a member of the Politburo of the Chinese Communist Party. Prior to that, he served as the Party Secretary of Jilin province, and Minister of Agriculture of China.

Sun was abruptly removed from office in July 2017 and put under investigation by the Central Commission for Discipline Inspection (CCDI). The CCDI accused him of political and criminal wrongdoing, and he was expelled from the Chinese Communist Party. He was convicted of bribery and sentenced to life imprisonment in 2018.

Sun was the youngest member of the 18th Politburo of the Chinese Communist Party, and the fourth sitting Politburo member to be expelled from the party since 1990. Prior to his fall from grace, Sun was once considered to be a leading candidate for a top leadership position in the "6th Generation of Chinese leadership".

== Early career ==
Sun was born to a family of farmers in a village located near the city of Rongcheng, Shandong province in September 1963. In 1980, Sun was admitted to the Laiyang Agricultural College (now Qingdao Agricultural University). After obtaining a bachelor's degree, he pursued post-graduate work at the Beijing Agriculture and Forestry Institute and the China Agricultural University, where he obtained master's degrees in agronomy. After completing his academic work, he remained at the institute to conduct further research and eventually obtained positions as an administrator, rising to become executive vice president of the institute, in charge of its day-to-day work.

Sun joined the Chinese Communist Party in July 1988. In 1997, he was named governor and Deputy Communist Party Secretary of Shunyi County in rural Beijing. Shunyi was then converted from a county to an urban district; Sun continued to serve as district governor. In February 2002, he became the Party Secretary of the Shunyi District. Shortly thereafter, in May 2002, Sun unexpectedly defeated then municipal Publicity Department head Jiang Xiaoyu in a municipal party committee election to earn a seat on the municipal Party Standing Committee, ascending to sub-provincial ranks at the mere age of 39. He was elevated to become secretary-general of the Beijing party organization from 2002 to 2006, in December 2006, he was appointed as Minister of Agriculture as nominated by Premier Wen Jiabao. At age 43, Sun was one of the youngest State Council ministers at the time.

== Jilin and Chongqing ==
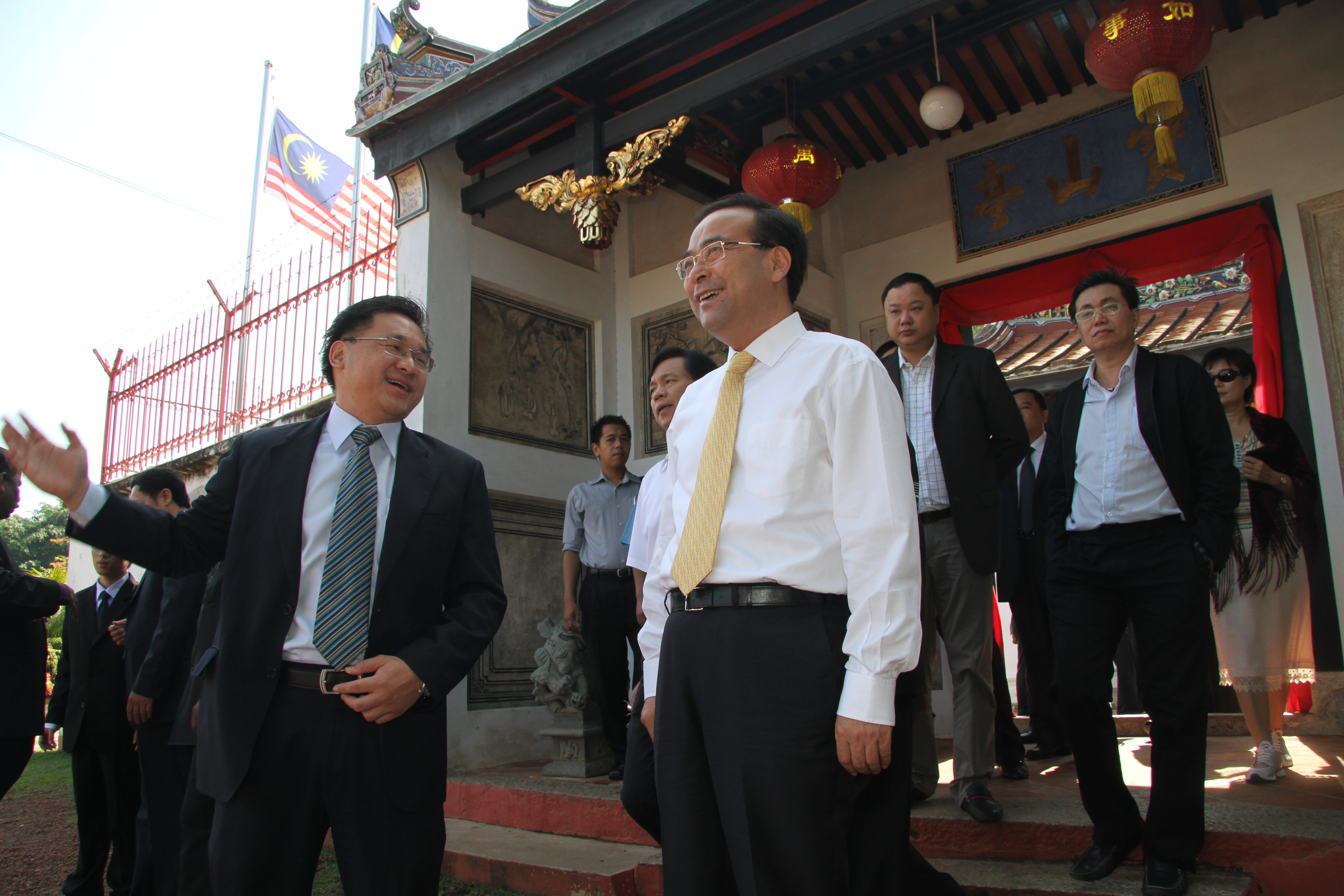
Sun Zhengcai visited Malacca in September 2011.

In November 2009, Sun was named party secretary of Jilin province, in northeast China. In November 2012, after the 18th CCP National Congress, he was appointed a member of the Politburo and replaced Zhang Dejiang as party chief of Chongqing. The post in Chongqing had emerged as one of the most important regional offices in China, and Sun's assuming the reins in the interior municipality signaled that he was likely destined for even higher office. It also demonstrated the trust that the central leadership placed in Sun, as Chongqing had only a month earlier weathered a political storm with the attempted defection of police chief Wang Lijun and the ouster of party chief Bo Xilai. Since the 1990s, regional leadership tenures were seen as important stepping stones to eventual national leadership.

It is not clear if Sun had any strong backing from former political heavyweights prior to his ascendancy to the Politburo; more likely, he was a consensus candidate whose loyalties crossed factional lines. It has been suggested that Jia Qinglin or Wen Jiabao may have served as Sun's advocate for promotion; the former because Sun worked for Beijing for much of his early political career, where Jia Qinglin was party secretary, and the latter because Wen and Sun both share a modest upbringing and common concerns for China's rural population.

In Chongqing, Sun advocated for a strategy he termed "Five Great Capability Areas" (五大功能区), splitting Chongqing into five spheres from which to distribute resources. In January 2016, Xi Jinping paid a visit to Chongqing during which he lauded the city's achievements. At the 2016 National People's Congress, Xi shook hands enthusiastically with Sun. The events led to speculation in the media that Sun had earned Xi's endorsement to progress further.

In February 2017, Sun's fate seemed to take a fatal turn. Inspection teams under the auspices of the Central Commission for Discipline Inspection released a report announcing that Chongqing had not done enough to excise its political scene from the influence of Bo Xilai and Wang Lijun, and that "party leadership had weakened". This was seen as an oblique criticism of Sun's own management of the party organization. It was the first blot on Sun in an otherwise steady term in Chongqing. In May, Sun took the opportunity at the municipal party congress to laud Xi as the party's leadership core, and declare his intentions to resolutely stamp out the influence of Bo Xilai and Wang Lijun. In June 2017, Chongqing police chief He Ting was removed from office. He Ting and Sun were from the same area of Shandong province.

On July 15, 2017, party authorities announced that Sun was to be replaced in his post as party secretary of Chongqing by Chen Min'er, who was propaganda chief in Zhejiang when Xi Jinping was provincial party secretary there. The meeting to announce the event had been called abruptly, and Sun himself was not present at the handover ceremony; there was no mention of his record in Chongqing, either, as was customary for major transition meetings. Curiously, footage of Sun also appeared to be deliberately cut from Xinwen Lianbo coverage of the National Finance Work Conference - a meeting attended by all Politburo members. These signs were taken as a political death knell for Sun.

== Investigation ==
On July 24, 2017, the Central Commission for Discipline Inspection announced that Sun was undergoing investigation for violating party discipline. The announcement marked the first time that a sitting Politburo member was investigated by the CCDI since Xi Jinping assumed power as General Secretary of the Chinese Communist Party at the 18th Party Congress. Before Sun, the last incumbent Politburo member subject to investigation was Bo Xilai (also then serving as Chongqing party secretary) in April 2012. Sun was the fourth sitting Politburo member investigated after 1990 - following Chen Xitong, Chen Liangyu, and Bo Xilai; all of them were party chiefs of direct-controlled municipalities.

Prior to his downfall, political observers generally saw Sun as being groomed for a higher leadership position due to his relative youth and the diversity of his experiences; he had even been characterized as a potential successor to Xi Jinping. The announcement of the investigation into Sun in July 2017 essentially put an end to his political career. Prior to the announcement of the investigation, Sun (along with Hu Chunhua) were seen by political observers as having almost certainly secured further advancement at the upcoming 19th Party Congress. Sun's departure seems to have upset the carefully calibrated conventions from previous administrations and made the congress more open-ended than would have otherwise been.

Following the announcement of Sun's investigation, numerous party organizations around the country rallied to declare their fealty to the decision - both reflecting the political gravity of the announcement and hearkening back to the political declarations five years earlier when a similar announcement was made about Bo Xilai. The jurisdictions that Sun had once led - Chongqing, Jilin, and the Ministry of Agriculture, were among the first to declare their "unwavering support" for the decision. Tianjin (under Li Hongzhong) and Guizhou (under Sun Zhigang) also held expanded meetings of party cadres to declare their support for the decision.

== Expulsion ==
On September 29, 2017, the Central Commission for Discipline Inspection, with uncharacteristic zeal, announced the results of the disciplinary case initiated against Sun, merely two months after he was formally placed under investigation. The commission accused Sun of "wavering in his ideals and beliefs, turned his back against the party's mission and values, failed to maintain a proper political stance... violated political discipline and political rules, violated the Eight-point Regulation, bathed in pomp and circumstance and belief in his special privileges; violated organizational discipline, practiced favoritism, and leaked organizational secrets." It added that Sun also sought illicit gain for relatives and took valuable gifts directly or through appointed persons.

Additionally, the commission said Sun became "highly bureaucratic, lazy and ineffective, led a degenerate and corrupt lifestyle, engaged in money-for-sex transactions." The communication did not explicitly say that Sun had accepted bribes, only that he is "suspected of criminal wrongdoing due to accepting valuables and used his power to seek gain for others," and that the investigation found evidence of further criminal acts. It concluded that Sun had "deviated from the party spirit, violated the party's political expectations for senior leading officials, and failed the trust of the party center and the hopes of the people, led to great damage to the mission of the party and state, and caused extremely bad impact on society." Sun was summarily expelled from the Chinese Communist Party and also formally expelled from the public service.

In the aftermath of Sun's expulsion, numerous party leaders in the jurisdictions Sun once served declared their loyalty to the decision. The party organization in Jilin province, where Sun once worked as party chief, took the opportunity to take a swipe at Sun's term there, publicly declaring, "Sun did not care about issues and the development of Jilin, and focused all his energy on getting a promotion, severely damaging the political ecology of the province."

During the investigation, Sun was said to have informed on a number of high-ranking officials in Chongqing, causing unprecedented fallout on the megacity's political scene shortly prior to the 19th Party Congress. While the municipality held elections for delegates to the congress in May, by the time a final list of delegates were released in late September, as many as 14 out of 43 of the initially selected list were surreptitiously removed, including five members of the municipal party standing committee. Mostly prominently, Chongqing party organization head Zeng Qinghong (not the former Vice President) was believed to be held for investigation.

On February 13, 2018, Sun was charged of bribery by the People's Procuratorate of Tianjin. He pleaded guilty to corruption charges at the Tianjin First Intermediate People's Court on April 12, 2018. Sun was sentenced to life imprisonment on May 8, 2018, for bribery worth 170 million yuan.

Sun was a member of the 17th Central Committee of the Chinese Communist Party and, until his expulsion, a member of the 18th Central Committee.

=== Connection to Whitney Duan and Zhang Peili ===
Desmond Shum, ex-husband of Whitney Duan and business partner of Zhang Peili, wife of Premier Wen Jiabao, revealed more detail about Sun's background and the circumstances for which he could have been purged in his book Red Roulette: An Insiders Story of Wealth, Power, Corruption, and Vengeance in Today's China. Desmond said that Whitney, Zhang, and himself had been connected to Sun since the early 2000s when they had been building out the Beijing Capital Airport logistics center and Sun was the party leader of the Shunyi suburb who granted them the land parcels. Evidently, Whitney and Zhang had "cultivated" his rise to power by positioning him as an ally to Hu and Wen, while ensuring promotions for him through backroom deals, as part of an ambitious plan of getting him to the Politburo Standing Committee, to become Whitney's main guanxi patron and ensuring future business deals and political influence for themselves after Wen Jiabao's retirement. Desmond claimed that Whitney and Zhang facilitated his promotion to Party Secretary of Beijing, Minister of Agriculture, and later Party Secretary of Jilin and Chongqing (and his promotion to the Politburo) through Wen Jiabao and Zeng Qinghong, a Jiang Zemin ally whose family also had extensive business relationships with Sun as well (he himself was later investigated as part of Sun's arrest).

Desmond claimed by 2012, the plan seemed to be on track and even better than expected as Sun and Hu Chunhua were regarded as the primary candidates for succeeding Xi Jinping in 2022. The two had an extremely hostile rivalry and Sun was getting assistance and support from Whitney and Zhang on how to outmaneuver Hu. Whitney had also become increasingly close to Wang Qishan, who was possibly involved in ensuring his further promotion especially after Wen's retirement. Although Desmond was unsure what the exact reason for Sun's downfall was, he believed that Xi Jinping personally wanted him purged as he was becoming increasingly concerned that either Sun or Hu were going to replace him in 2022 through the influence of Hu Jintao allies, who also opposed his desire to extend his mandate beyond two terms. Desmond noted two factors, first was that Xi selected Chen Min'er, one of his allies from Zhejiang Province to replace Sun. Second was that Wang Qishan was in charge of the Central Commission for Discipline Inspection when Sun was purged, indicating that he was likely unable to protect Sun and Whitney from arrest. Whitney herself disappeared two weeks before Sun's arrest.

== Personal life ==
Sun was married to Hu Ying (胡颖), a professor at Capital Normal University. She was at one point a visiting scholar at Rensselaer Polytechnic Institute. Beginning in 2005 she held a senior position at China Minsheng Bank. The couple had one child, who attended Cornell University.

Sun reportedly kept an emperor's dragon robe in a room in his home, and frequently prayed to it. Media reports said that Sun was addicted to the mobile video game King of Glory, would play the game prior to conferences, and would make his aides wait outside while he finished a game in his vehicle before getting off.

Party political offices
Preceded by Zhang Dejiang	Party Secretary of Chongqing; 2012 – 2017	Succeeded by Chen Min'er
Preceded by Wang Min	Party Secretary of Jilin; 2009 – 2012	Succeeded by Wang Rulin
Government offices
Preceded by Du Qinglin	Minister of Agriculture; 2006 – 2009	Succeeded by Han Changfu
