= Liu Zhiqiang =

Chinese politician

- 刘志强

Vice Minister of Justice
- In office January 2016 – June 2023
- Premier: Li Keqiang; Li Qiang
- Minister: Wu Aiying; Fu Zhenghua; Tang Yijun

Head of Qinghai Provincial Public Security Department
- In office 27 June 2012 – June 2023
- Preceded by: He Ting
- Succeeded by: Wang Zhengsheng

Personal details
- Born: July 1963 (age 63) Juancheng County, Shandong, China
- Party: Chinese Communist Party (expelled in 2024)
- Education: Chinese People's University of Police Officers; University of Exeter

Chinese name
- Simplified Chinese: 刘志强
- Traditional Chinese: 劉志強
Transcriptions
Standard Mandarin
- Hanyu Pinyin: Liǘ Zhìqiáng

Liu Zhiqiang (Chinese: 刘志强; born July 1963) is a former Chinese politician who served as Vice Minister of Justice from January 2016 to June 2023. As of April 2024 he was under investigation by China's top anti-graft watchdog.

== Early life and education ==
Liu was born in Juancheng County, Shandong, in July 1963. In 1980, he enrolled at the College of International Relations (now Chinese People's University of Police Officers), where he majored in English.

== Career ==
After graduating in 1984, Liu was assigned to the Foreign Affairs Bureau of the Ministry of Public Security. He joined the Chinese Communist Party (CCP) in December 1986. He served at the bureau for 20 years, ultimately being appointed director in February 2004. He became director of the International Cooperation Bureau in October 2005, and served until June 2012.

In June 2012, Liu was transferred to northwest China's Qinghai province. He was appointed vice governor of Qinghai, concurrently serving as secretary of the Political and Legal Affairs Commission and head of Qinghai Provincial Public Security Department.

He took office as vice minister of justice in January 2016, and held that office until June 2023.

== Downfall ==
On 30 April 2024, Liu was put under investigation for alleged "serious violations of discipline and laws" by the Central Commission for Discipline Inspection (CCDI), the party's internal disciplinary body, and the National Supervisory Commission, the highest anti-corruption agency of China. During Liu's tenure as vice minister, all three of his superiors were sacked for graft, namely Wu Aiying, Fu Zhenghua, and Tang Yijun. On October 22, he was expelled from the CCP. On November 7, he was detained by the Supreme People's Procuratorate.

On 11 February 2025, Liu was indicted on suspicion of accepting bribes. On May 9, he stood trial for bribery at the Intermediate People's Court of Wuhu. Prosecutors accused him of taking advantage of his different positions between 2007 and 2024 to seek profits for various companies and individuals in enterprise management, project contracting, business promotion, and job promotion, in return, he accepted money and property worth over 42.45 million ($5.9 million). On July 22, he was eventually sentenced to 13 years in jail and fined three million yuan for taking bribes. All his personal assets were confiscated.

Government offices
Preceded by He Ting	Head of Qinghai Provincial Public Security Department; 2016–2023	Succeeded by Wang Zhengsheng
