= He Ting =

Chinese politician and police officer

- 何挺

Vice Mayor of Chongqing
- In office March 14, 2012 – October 9, 2017
- Party Secretary: Zhang Dejiang; Sun Zhengcai; Chen Min'er
- Mayor: Huang Qifan; Zhang Guoqing

Personal details
- Born: February 1962 (age 64) Rongcheng, Shandong, China
- Party: Chinese Communist Party (until 2017)
- Education: Southwest University of Political Science & Law

He Ting (Chinese: 何挺; born February 1962) is a former Chinese official best known for his term as police chief of the interior megacity of Chongqing. He was removed from office in June 2017 and subsequently expelled from the Chinese Communist Party (CCP) for violating party rules. A lifelong public security official with a specialty in anti-terrorism operations, He served two regional tenures before being transferred to Chongqing to take over local law enforcement from disgraced police chief Wang Lijun.

== Career ==
He Ting was born in Rongcheng, Shandong province. He graduated from the Southwest University of Political Science & Law in 1979, where he studied criminal investigation. In 1983, he became a detective at the Ministry of Public Security. He rose through the ranks progressively at the ministry - ascending from an ordinary officer up the command chain. He became a specialist in anti-terrorism operations. In 1996, he became deputy chief of the Criminal Investigation Department at the ministry. In 2002, he was made head of the anti-terrorism bureau at the ministry; he then became head of criminal investigation until 2007. He took part in the investigation of many famous cases, including the 1990 Guangzhou Baiyun airport collisions, the 1994 Qiandao Lake Incident, and the 2001 Beijing West Railway Station hostage incident.

In 2007, He was transferred to the northwestern interior and was named assistant to the Governor in Gansu province, and provincial police chief. In 2008, he was transferred to the same position in Qinghai province. In 2009, he was named vice governor of Qinghai. In March 2012, following the Wang Lijun incident, He was parachuted into Chongqing and named police chief there, succeeding Wang. He presided over law enforcement in the interior megacity where he attended college for much of the next five years.

In April 2017, Hong Kong-based Sing Tao Daily reported that He was undergoing investigation. In June, his profile was pulled from the Chongqing government website, leading to widespread speculation that he had fallen into disgrace. When asked about He Ting by Hong Kong journalists during a press conference on June 9, Chongqing deputy party chief Tang Liangzhi told assembled media that "As for He Ting, we should wait for more news. He Ting is directly appointed by the party centre, so I have no comment. But don't worry, there will be more news. Everything in Chongqing is normal."

On June 16, He Ting was officially relieved of his position as vice mayor. Less than a month later, Chongqing CCP committee secretary Sun Zhengcai, also a member of the Politburo of the Chinese Communist Party, was removed from office. He Ting had reportedly boasted about his relationship with Sun during his tenure in Chongqing, possibly due to their sharing the same hometown in Shandong. Some Chongqing-based insiders told the press that it was possible that Sun was outed by He Ting, though the information could not be officially confirmed. He and Sun's downfall in quick succession mirrored similar events five years earlier when Chongqing police chief Wang Lijun and party chief Bo Xilai became subject to a sensational political scandal that ended with the disgrace of both men.

On October 9, 2017, the Central Commission for Discipline Inspection announced the expulsion of He Ting from the CCP for violating "many rules and regulations." He was demoted to a fuchuji non-leading position, and forced to retire early.
