= Chen Min'er =

Chinese politician (born 1960)

- 陈敏尔
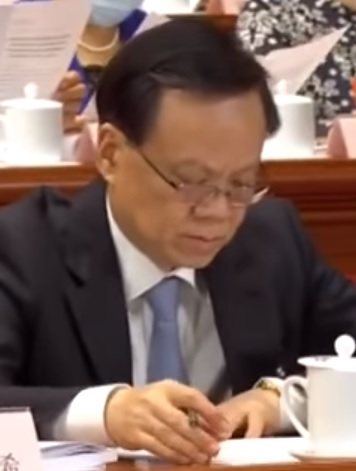
- Chen in 2020

Party Secretary of Tianjin
- Incumbent
- Assumed office 8 December 2022
- Deputy: Zhang Gong (mayor)
- General secretary: Xi Jinping
- Preceded by: Li Hongzhong

Party Secretary of Chongqing
- In office 15 July 2017 – 8 December 2022
- Deputy: Zhang Guoqing; Tang Liangzhi; Hu Henghua (mayor)
- General secretary: Xi Jinping
- Preceded by: Sun Zhengcai
- Succeeded by: Yuan Jiajun

Party Secretary of Guizhou
- In office 31 July 2015 – 15 July 2017
- Deputy: Sun Zhigang (Governor); Chen Yiqin (party affairs)
- General secretary: Xi Jinping
- Preceded by: Zhao Kezhi
- Succeeded by: Sun Zhigang

Governor of Guizhou
- In office 18 December 2012 – 16 October 2015
- Preceded by: Zhao Kezhi
- Succeeded by: Sun Zhigang

Personal details
- Born: 29 September 1960 (age 66) Zhuji, Zhejiang, China
- Party: Chinese Communist Party
- Education: Shaoxing University

Chen Min'er
- "Chen Min'er" in Simplified (top) and Traditional (bottom) Chinese characters
- Simplified Chinese: 陈敏尔
- Traditional Chinese: 陳敏爾
Transcriptions
Standard Mandarin
- Hanyu Pinyin: Chén Mǐn'ěr
- IPA: [ʈʂʰə̌n mìn.àɚ]
Wu
- Suzhounese: Zén Mìn-nzî
Yue: Cantonese
- Yale Romanization: Chàhn Máhn-yíh
- Jyutping: Can^{4} Man^{5}-ji^{5}
- IPA: [tsʰɐn˩ mɐn˩˧.ji˩˧]
Southern Min
- Tâi-lô: Tân Bín-nī

Chen Min'er (Chinese: 陈敏尔; pinyin: Chén Mǐn'ěr; born 29 September 1960) is a Chinese politician and a member of the Politburo of the Chinese Communist Party who is serving as the Party Secretary of Tianjin.

Chen spent most of his career in his native Zhejiang province, serving as head of the provincial department of media, and Vice Governor of Zhejiang. In 2013, he was transferred to Guizhou as governor, and in 2015 promoted to provincial Party Secretary. Chen was catapulted to prominence in 2017 in the aftermath of the ouster of Chongqing party secretary Sun Zhengcai, a move that made him well-positioned for further elevation. He also became a Politburo member in October 2017. Chen was appointed as the Party Secretary of Tianjin in December 2022.

== Early life and education ==
Chen was born on 29 September 1960 in Zhuji, Zhejiang. From 1978 to 1981 Chen Min'er studied Chinese at Shaoxing Normal College (later merged into Shaoxing University) in Zhejiang. From 1981 to 1982, he worked as a propaganda clerk in Shaoxing Normal College. He attended a course for instructors of political theory in Zhejiang Provincial Party School from 1982 to 1983.

== Career ==
=== Zhejiang ===
After college he worked in the Shaoxing government, first serving at the Publicity Department of the Shaoxing Municipal Party Committee from 1984 to 1987. From 1987 to 1989, he served as the head of the Publicity Department, as well as a member of the Shaoxing County Party Standing Committee. He became the deputy head of the Publicity Department of the Shaoxing Municipal Party Committee in 1989. He became the deputy party secretary of Shaoxing County in 1990, and also became the county governor in 1991; he further became the Communist Party Secretary (the top position in the county) in 1994. From 1995 to 1996, he participated in a full-time training program at the Central Party School. He became a member of the Standing Committee of the Shaoxing Municipal Party Committee in 1996.

In 1997, Chen was transferred to the neighbouring city of Ningbo to become its vice mayor, also becoming a member of the city's Party Standing Committee. He became the executive vice mayor in 1998 In 1999 he was promoted to deputy party secretary Ningbo. In December 1999 Chen was appointed the chief editor of Zhejiang Daily, the official government newspaper of Zhejiang province, and in 2001 he became the Propaganda Chief of the Zhejiang Communist Party Committee. In June 2002, Chen, then 42, earned a seat on the provincial Party Standing Committee. From May 2007 to January 2012 he was a Vice Governor of Zhejiang. During this period he worked under Zhejiang party secretary Xi Jinping.

In mid-2007, following a change in the Zhejiang Provincial Committee of the Chinese Communist Party, Chen Miner was reappointed as a member of the Standing Committee of the Provincial Party Committee, subsequently assuming the role of Executive Vice Governor of the Zhejiang Provincial People's Government, serving as the deputy to the then Governor of Zhejiang Province, Lü Zushan.

=== Guizhou ===
In January 2012, Chen was transferred to the southwestern interior province of Guizhou to become its Deputy Party Secretary, and in December he was appointed Acting Governor of Guizhou, succeeding Zhao Kezhi, who had been promoted to Party Secretary. In January 2013 he was officially confirmed as governor by the Guizhou Provincial Congress.

In 2014, he initiated the "Big Data, Big Poverty Reduction" strategy for Guizhou. Chen later added a third aspect of the strategy, "Big Ecology", to emphasise that development goals should also be pursued with careful consideration to environmental impacts. The Guizhou digital economy has grown significantly since 2015 and as of 2025 continues to develop Guizhou's growing reputation as a center for big data in China.

In July 2015, Chen was promoted to Party Secretary of Guizhou, becoming only the fourth provincial party-level secretary born after the year 1960 (after Hu Chunhua, Zhou Qiang, and Sun Zhengcai). After taking charge as party secretary, Chen enthusiastically advanced the policies of CCP General secretary Xi Jinping, such as the "Three Stricts and Three Honests" education campaign. Chen also led an initiative to set up formal discussions (yuetan) over alleged wrongdoing by officials in the province, personally taking charge of the most serious cases. In an interview with the media organs of the Central Commission for Discipline Inspection, Chen repeated the slogan "power must be restricted in the cage of institutions, and power should be exercised in sunshine," (i.e., transparently and openly). Chen set up over 1,400 working committees in neighbourhoods and rural areas in the province to oversee complaints over routine government services.

=== Chongqing ===
In July 2017, Chen was appointed as the Party Secretary of Chongqing municipality, replacing Sun Zhengcai. As Chen assumed leadership over one of the four direct-controlled municipalities, the move assured him a seat in the CCP Politburo (decision-making body) at the 19th CCP Party Congress.

Chen was an alternate of the 17th Central Committee and a full member of the 18th Central Committee of the Chinese Communist Party. Chen has been portrayed by overseas media as an associate of CCP leader Xi Jinping, and has been named as part of the "New Zhijiang Army".

=== Tianjin ===
Chen was reappointed to the Politburo after the 20th CCP Party Congress in October 2022. He was appointed as the Party Secretary of Tianjin in December 2022.

== Personal life ==
Chen Min'er has a daughter, who is married to the son of Si Xinliang.

Party political offices
Preceded by Li Hongzhong	Party Secretary of Tianjin; 2022–	Incumbent
Preceded by Sun Zhengcai	Party Secretary of Chongqing; 2017–2022	Succeeded by Yuan Jiajun
Preceded by Zhao Kezhi	Party Secretary of Guizhou; 2015–2017	Succeeded by Sun Zhigang
Preceded by Si Xinliang	Head of the Publicity Department of the CCP Zhejiang Provincial Committee; 2001–2007	Succeeded by Huang Kunming
Government offices
Preceded by Zhao Kezhi	Governor of Guizhou; 2012–2015	Succeeded by Sun Zhigang
Order of precedence
Preceded by Li Hongzhong as Member of the Politburo of the Chinese Communist Party	Order of precedence of China as Member of the Politburo of the Chinese Communist Party	Succeeded by He Lifeng as Member of the Politburo of the Chinese Communist Party
