= Ma Zhengqi =

Chinese politician (born 1959)

- 马正其

Deputy Director of the State Administration for Market Regulation
- In office March 2018 – May 2019
- Leader: Zhang Mao (director)

Deputy Director of the State Administration for Industry and Commerce
- In office April 2013 – March 2018
- Leader: Zhang Mao (director)
- Preceded by: Teng Jiacai
- Succeeded by: Position revoked

Executive Vice-Mayor of Chongqing
- In office April 2010 – April 2013
- Leader: Wang Hongju (mayor)
- Preceded by: Huang Qifan
- Succeeded by: Weng Jieming

Vice-Mayor of Chongqing
- In office January 2007 – April 2010
- Leader: Wang Hongju (mayor)

Personal details
- Born: March 1959 (age 67) Yongchuan County, Sichuan, China
- Party: Chinese Communist Party
- Education: Chongqing Normal University; Central Party School of the Chinese Communist Party

Chinese name
- Traditional Chinese: 馬正其
- Simplified Chinese: 马正其
Transcriptions
Standard Mandarin
- Hanyu Pinyin: Mǎ Zhèngqí

Ma Zhengqi (Chinese: 马正其; born March 1959) is a retired Chinese politician. He served as deputy director of the State Administration for Industry and Commerce between 2013 and 2018 and deputy director of the State Administration for Market Regulation between 2018 and 2019. He was a member of the 18th Central Committee of the Chinese Communist Party and a member of the 13th Standing Committee of the Chinese People's Political Consultative Conference.

== Early life and education ==
Ma was born and raised in Yongchuan County, Sichuan. He graduated from Chongqing Normal University, majoring in Chinese language and literature.

== Political career ==
Ma entered the workforce in October 1976 and joined the Chinese Communist Party in April 1977.

Beginning in 1976, he served in several posts in Yongchuan County, including public security member, director, and Chinese Communist Party Committee Secretary.

In May 1994, he was appointed the CCP Committee Secretary of Rongchang County, he remained in that position until April 1997, when he was transferred to Chongqing and appointed the deputy secretary-general of Chongqing Government.

He became the CCP party chief of Wanzhou District in June 2002, he was re-appointed in January 2003.

Ma was elevated to the vice-mayor of Chongqing in January 2007, rising to executive vice-mayor in April 2010.

He was promoted to become the deputy director of the State Administration for Industry and Commerce in April 2013, a position he held until March 2018. In March 2018, he became deputy director of the State Administration for Market Regulation, serving in the post until his retirement in May 2019.

In the middle of 2013, during the anti-corruption campaign under Xi Jinping, a Chinese journalist Liu Hu accused him of corruption in real-name reporting, but the Chinese government protected him. Lai Dong (赖东; 賴東), a local official of Wanzhou District said to the reporter of Beijing Times (京华时报; 京華時報), "Over the years, report hasn't been interrupted, but haven't got the result." (“这么多年来，举报一直没间断，但一直没结果。”)

== See also ==
- List of members of the 11th National People's Congress

Government offices
Preceded by Huang Qifan	Executive Vice-Mayor of Chongqing; 2010–2013	Succeeded by Weng Jieming
Preceded by Teng Jiacai	Deputy Director of the State Administration for Industry and Commerce; 2013–2018	Succeeded by Position revoked
