= Zengjia, Chongqing =

Zengjia 曾家镇
- Town
- Location in Chongqing
- Coordinates: 29.5529°N 106.2993°E
- Country: People's Republic of China
- Municipality: Chongqing
- District: Shapingba

Area
  - Total: 36.51 km^{2} (14.10 sq mi)

Population
  - Total: 75,200
  - Density: 2,060/km^{2} (5,330/sq mi)

Zengjia (Chinese: 曾家镇; pinyin: Zēngjiā Zhèn) is a town of Shapingba district, Chongqing, China. Located in the southwest of the district, the town covers 36.51 km^{2} (14.10 sq mi) with a population of 75.2 thousand. It is bordered by Chenjiaqiao subdistrict to the east, Jiulongpo district to the south, Bicheng subdistrict of Bishan, Chongqing Campus town to the north. Wen Qiang who was the former Master Chieftain of the gang trials and the former deputy police commissioner of Chongqing was born here.

Zengjia was the former administrative division of Ba County, or Baxian (巴县). The county was dissolved in March 1995, the portion of the former Baxian was formed the new Banan district. Just at this time, Zengjia was changed under the jurisdiction of Shapingba.

== See also ==
- List of township-level divisions of Chongqing
