= Zeng Qinghong (born 1962) =

Chinese female politician (born 1962)

Zeng Qinghong (Chinese: 曾庆红; born April 1962) is a Chinese politician from Jiangxi province, serving since 2013 as the Head of the Organization Department of Chongqing. In the past, she had served as the mayor of Jiujiang, and the vice governor of Jiangxi.

Zeng was born in Xingguo County, Jiangxi Province. She graduated from Jiangxi University (now Nanchang University) with a degree in Marxist philosophy. She joined the Chinese Communist Party (CCP) in July 1984. After graduating from university, she was sent to work for the Communist Youth League organization in Xinfeng County, Jiangxi. She then served in local CCP propaganda organizations teaching and disseminating party doctrine. She has served as the mayor of the cities of Pingxiang and Ji'an (both prefecture-level). In December 2008 she was named CCP Deputy Committee Secretary of Jiujiang, and was confirmed as mayor of Jiujiang on February 27, 2009. In August 2011 she was named deputy Organization Department head of Jiangxi province, before being named vice governor of Jiangxi in January 2013.

In July 2013, she was transferred to Chongqing to become head of the CCP Organization Department there. During her tenure in Chongqing, the city's political scene experienced significant upheaval. In 2017, then Chongqing party chief Sun Zhengcai was removed from office. It was reported that Zeng was also placed under investigation in September 2017; television footage showed her missing from an important meeting of municipal leaders.

Zeng's name is identical in pronunciation and in written characters as former Vice President and CCP Politburo Standing Committee member Zeng Qinghong; the two are not known to be related, though they are both from Jiangxi province, and they shook hands on at least one occasion: when the female Zeng Qinghong was the mayor of Pingxiang.
