= Li Tielin =

Chinese politician

- 李铁林

Chairperson of Handling Proposals Committee of the Chinese People's Political Consultative Conference
- In office March 2003 – March 2013
- Preceded by: Fu Jie
- Succeeded by: Sun Gan

Director of the State Commission Office for Public Sector Reform
- In office September 2002 – July 2007

Personal details
- Born: May 1943 (age 83) Yan'an, Shaanxi, China
- Party: Chinese Communist Party
- Relations: Li Tieying
- Parent(s): Li Weihan; Wu Jingzhi
- Education: Tsinghua University

Chinese name
- Simplified Chinese: 李铁林
- Traditional Chinese: 李鐵林
Transcriptions
Standard Mandarin
- Hanyu Pinyin: Lǐ Tiělín

Li Tielin (Chinese: 李铁林; born May 1943) is a Chinese politician who served as director of the State Commission Office for Public Sector Reform from 2002 to 2007. He was a member of the 16th Central Committee of the Chinese Communist Party. He was a member of the Standing Committee of the 11th Chinese People's Political Consultative Conference.

== Biography ==
Li was born in Yan'an, Shaanxi in May 1943, to Li Weihan, a Chinese Communist Party politician, and Wu Jingzhi (吴景之). His elder half-brother Li Tieying is also a Chinese Communist Party politician. In 1962, he was accepted to Tsinghua University, majoring in micromachine. After university in 1968, he was assigned to Shandong Weifang Dyeing Factory as a worker. He was transferred to Beijing Textile Science Research Institute, in 1973, becoming deputy president in 1982. He joined the Chinese Communist Party in December 1980. He was deputy head of the Industry Department of CCP Beijing Municipal Committee in October 1984 and party secretary of Dongcheng District in March 1987. He rose to become deputy secretary-general of the Organization Department of the Chinese Communist Party in July 1989, concurrently serving as director of the Bureau of Economic, Scientific and Educational Cadres. In September 1992, he became deputy head of the Organization Department of the Chinese Communist Party, concurrently serving as deputy director of Central Health Committee since January 1995. In September 2002, he was appointed director of the State Commission Office for Public Sector Reform, a post he kept until July 2007. In March 2003, he was chosen as chairperson of Handling Proposals Committee of the Chinese People's Political Consultative Conference, China's top political advisory body.

Party political offices
Preceded by Zhao Zongnai	Executive Deputy Head of the Organization Department of the Chinese Communist Party; 1995–2002	Succeeded by Zhao Hongzhu
Preceded by Zhang Zhijian	Director of the State Commission Office for Public Sector Reform; 2002–2009	Succeeded by Wang Dongming
Assembly seats
Preceded by Fu Jie	Chairperson of Handling Proposals Committee of the Chinese People's Political Consultative Conference; 2003–2013	Succeeded by Sun Gan
