= Pan Wenhua =

Chinese general (1886–1950)

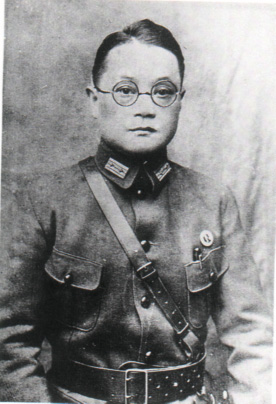
Pan Wenhua

Pan Wenhua (simplified Chinese: 潘文华; traditional Chinese: 潘文華; pinyin: Pān Wénhuá; 16 October 1886 – 16 November 1950), courtesy name Zhongsan (仲三) was a Kuomintang general from Sichuan.

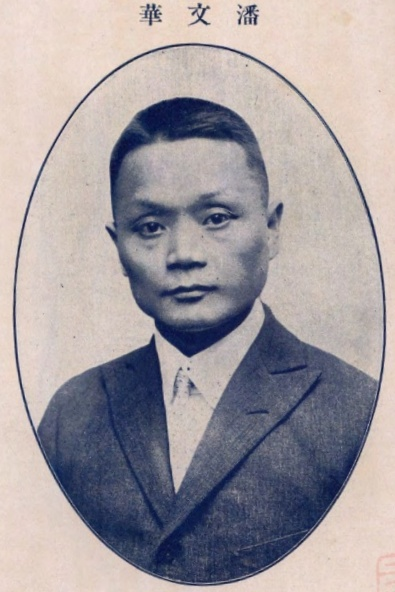
Pan Wenhua

== Biography ==
Born in Renshou County, Sichuan in 1885, Pan was the Command of the 28th Division of the National Revolutionary Army in the Second Sino-Japanese War. In the winter of 1944 he secretly joined the China Democratic League, maintaining frequent contact with top-ranking Chinese Communists such as Mao Zedong, Zhou Enlai, Wang Ruofei (王若飞), etc. He died of natural causes in Chengdu in 1950.

Preceded by	Mayor of Chongqing; 1927 – 1935	Succeeded by Zhang Biguo
