= He Guangyuan =

Chinese politician

- 何光远

Chairperson of the Handling Proposals Committee of the Chinese People's Political Consultative Conference
- In office March 1998 – March 2003
- Preceded by: Zhou Shaozheng
- Succeeded by: He Guangyuan

Minister of Machine-Building Industry
- In office March 1993 – March 1996
- Premier: Li Peng
- Preceded by: New title
- Succeeded by: Bao Xuding

Minister of Machinery and Electronics Industry
- In office December 1989 – March 1993
- Premier: Li Peng
- Preceded by: Zou Jiahua
- Succeeded by: Position revoked

Personal details
- Born: February 1930 (age 96) Anxin County, Hebei, China
- Party: Chinese Communist Party
- Education: North China University; Kiev Polytechnic Institute

Chinese name
- Simplified Chinese: 何光远
- Traditional Chinese: 何光遠
Transcriptions
Standard Mandarin
- Hanyu Pinyin: Hé Guāngyuǎn

He Guangyuan (Chinese: 何光远; born February 1930) is a Chinese politician who served as minister of machinery and electronics industry from 1989 to 1993 and minister of machine-building industry from 1993 to 1996.

He was an alternate member of the 12th and 13th Central Committee of the Chinese Communist Party, and a member of the 14th Central Committee of the Chinese Communist Party. He was a member of the Standing Committee of the 8th and 9th Chinese People's Political Consultative Conference.

== Biography ==
He was born in Anxin County, Hebei, in February 1930. He joined the Chinese Communist Party (CCP) in July 1945. He worked in the Central Hebei Military District during the Chinese Civil War. After graduating from North China University in 1951, he was sent to study at the Department of Mechanical Industry, Kiev Polytechnic Institute, where he graduated in 1956.

Starting in 1956, he served in several posts in Changchun First Automobile Manufacturing Factory (长春第一汽车制造厂), including technologist, deputy section chief, section chief, deputy factory director of Forging Branch, and factory director of Forging Branch. In 1966, when the Cultural Revolution broke out, he was removed from office and effectively sidelined. He was forced to work in the fields instead of working in the state-owned factory. He was later reinstated in 1972. In 1977, he was appointed party secretary and factory director of Changchun Tractor Factory (长春拖拉机制造厂), in addition to serving as vice mayor of Changchun.

He became vice minister of agricultural machinery in 1980. In 1982, he became vice minister of machine-building industry, rising to minister in 1993. He also served as vice minister of machinery and electronics industry in 1988 and minister of machinery and electronics industry in 1989.

In March 1998, he took office as chairperson of the Handling Proposals Committee of the Chinese People's Political Consultative Conference, a post he kept until March 2003.

Government offices
Preceded by Zou Jiahua	Minister of Machinery and Electronics Industry; 1989–1993	Succeeded by Position revoked
New title	Minister of Machine-Building Industry; 1993–1996	Succeeded by Bao Xuding
Assembly seats
Preceded by Zhou Shaozheng	Chairperson of the Handling Proposals Committee of the Chinese People's Political Consultative Conference; 1998–2003	Succeeded by He Guangyuan
