= Liao Guoxun =

Chinese politician (1963–2022)

- 廖国勋

Mayor of Tianjin
- In office 3 September 2020 – 27 April 2022; Acting until 16 September 2020
- Preceded by: Zhang Guoqing
- Succeeded by: Zhang Gong

Deputy Communist Party Secretary of Tianjin
- In office 31 August 2020 – 27 April 2022
- Secretary: Li Hongzhong

Deputy Communist Party Secretary of Shanghai
- In office February 2020 – August 2020
- Secretary: Li Qiang

Personal details
- Born: February 1963 Chengdu, Sichuan, China
- Died: 27 April 2022 (aged 59) Tianjin, China
- Party: Chinese Communist Party
- Education: Guizhou Normal University; Central Party School of the Chinese Communist Party

Chinese name
- Traditional Chinese: 廖國勛
- Simplified Chinese: 廖国勋
Transcriptions
Standard Mandarin
- Hanyu Pinyin: Liào Guóxūn

Liao Guoxun (Chinese: 廖国勋; February 1963 – 27 April 2022) was a Chinese politician who served as mayor and deputy party chief of Tianjin. He was of Tujia ethnicity.

Born in Chengdu, Sichuan, he graduated from Guizhou Normal University and Central Party School of the Chinese Communist Party. He began his career as a teacher in Kaili, before getting into politics in the government of Qiandongnan Miao and Dong Autonomous Prefecture. He was deputy party chief of Tongren in 2007 and one year later was promoted to party chief position. Afterwards, he was member of the CCP Standing Committees in two provincial-level administrative divisions of both Guizhou and Zhejiang and one direct-administered municipality Shanghai.

He was a delegate to the 11th and 13th National People's Congress. He was a delegate to the 18th National Congress of the Chinese Communist Party and was a delegate to the 19th National Congress of the Chinese Communist Party.

== Early life and education ==
Liao was born in Chengdu, Sichuan, in February 1963. After the resumption of National College Entrance Examination, he was accepted to Guizhou Normal University, where he majored in chemistry.

== Political career ==
=== In Guizhou ===
After graduating in August 1983, he was dispatched to Kaili No. 4 High School as a teacher and deputy secretary of the Communist Youth League Committee. Liao became involved in politics in January 1986, when he was transferred to the Organization Department of CPC Qiandongnan Prefecture Committee. By June 2007 when he was appointed deputy party chief and later party chief of Tongren, he had served in various posts in the General Office of CCP Guizhou Provincial Committee. In April 2012, he was elected a member of the Standing Committee of CCP Guizhou Provincial Committee at the First session of the 11th CCP Guizhou Provincial Committee, a position at vice-ministerial level.

=== HR chief of Zhejiang ===
In April 2015, he was transferred to east China's Zhejiang province and appointed head of the Organization Department of CPC Zhejiang Provincial Committee and a Provincial Standing Committee member.

=== Supervisory chief of Shanghai ===
A year and a half later, he was transferred to the neighboring direct-administered municipality Shanghai and appointed a member of the Standing Committee of CPC Shanghai Municipal Committee and secretary of the CPC Shanghai Municipal Commission for Discipline Inspection, the party's agency in charge of anti-corruption efforts. On January 28, 2018, he was unanimously elected as director of the newly founded Shanghai Municipal Supervisory Commission, the government's agency in charge of anti-corruption efforts. On February 28, 2020, he was promoted to become deputy party chief of Shanghai, a position he held until the end of August 2020.

=== Mayor of Tianjin ===
On August 31, 2020, he was appointed deputy party chief of North China's Tianjin municipality. He was named acting mayor on September 3 and was installed as mayor on September 16. His last public appearance was on April 24, 2022, when he attended and spoke at the Tianjin municipal work conference on deepening pollution prevention and control.

== Death ==
On April 27, 2022, Liao died of a sudden illness at the age of 59. His death was announced on the public account of newspaper Tianjin Daily in WeChat on the following evening, with the obituary being very brief.

Government offices
Preceded by Shen Yiqin	Mayor of Tongren; 2007–2008	Succeeded by Li Zaiyong
New title	Director of Shanghai Municipal Supervisory Commission; 2018–2020	Succeeded by Liu Xuexin
Preceded by Zhang Guoqing	Mayor of Tianjin; 2020–2022	Succeeded by Zhang Gong
Party political offices
Preceded by Yang Yuxue	Communist Party Secretary of Tongren; 2008–2012	Succeeded by Liu Qifan
Preceded by Zhang Qunshan	Secretary-General of the CPC Guizhou Provincial Committee; 2012–2015	Succeeded by Liu Qifan
Preceded by Hu Heping	Head of the Organization Department of CPC Zhejiang Provincial Committee; 2015–2016	Succeeded by Ren Zhenhe
Preceded by Hou Kai	Secretary of the CPC Shanghai Municipal Commission for Discipline Inspection; 2016–2020	Succeeded by Liu Xuexin
Preceded by Yin Hong	Deputy Communist Party Secretary of Shanghai; 2020–2020	Succeeded by Yu Shaoliang
Preceded by Yin Hong	Secretary of Shanghai Political and Legislative Affairs Committee; 2020–2020	Succeeded by Yu Shaoliang
