= Tan Qiwei =

Chinese politician

- 谭栖伟

Vice-Chairman of Chongqing People's Congress
- In office January 2013 – May 2014
- Chairman: Zhang Xuan (张轩)

Vice Mayor of Chongqing
- In office March 2006 – January 2013
- Leader: Huang Qifan (mayor)

Communist Party Secretary of Nan'an District
- In office December 2001 – March 2006
- Succeeded by: Zhang Ji (张季)

Communist Party Secretary of Youyang Tujia and Miao Autonomous County
- In office September 1989 – November 1991

Magistrate of Shizhu Tujia Autonomous County
- In office July 1985 – September 1989

Personal details
- Born: August 1954 (age 72) Shizhu County, Chongqing, China
- Party: Chinese Communist Party (1973–2014; expelled)
- Education: Chongqing Party School of the Chinese Communist Party

Chinese name
- Traditional Chinese: 譚棲偉
- Simplified Chinese: 谭栖伟
Transcriptions
Standard Mandarin
- Hanyu Pinyin: Tán Qīweǐ

Tan Qiwei (Chinese: 谭栖伟; born August 1954) is a former Chinese politician of Tujia ethnic heritage. He was the Vice Mayor of Chongqing, then the Vice Chairman of the Chongqing People's Congress. He was dismissed from office in May 2014 and placed under investigation by the Communist Party's anti-corruption body.

== Early life and education ==
Tan was born and raised in Shizhu County, Chongqing, where he graduated from Chongqing Party School of the Chinese Communist Party.

== Career ==
Tan joined the workforce in March 1973 and joined the Chinese Communist Party in November 1973.

During the Cultural Revolution, Tan worked as a sent-down youth in his hometown.

In July 1985, he was appointed the CPC County Committee Vice-Secretary and County Governor of Shizhu Tujia Autonomous County, he remained in that position until September 1989, when he was transferred to Youyang Tujia and Miao Autonomous County and appointed the CPC County Committee Secretary.

From November 1991 to March 1997, Tan worked in Qianjiang District of Chongqing as an officer. Then he was transferred to Nan'an District as the District Mayor and CPC Vice-Secretary, he became the CPC Party Secretary in December 2001, and served until March 2006.

In March 2006 he was promoted to become the Vice Mayor of Chongqing, a position he held until January 2013, he took charge of the project Three Gorges Dam. In January 2013, Tan was appointed as the vice-chairman of Chongqing People's Congress.

== Investigation ==
On May 3, 2014, Tan was being investigated by the Central Commission for Discipline Inspection for "serious violations of laws and regulations". Tan was removed from office in September 2014, and expelled from the Chinese Communist Party.

On January 7, 2016, Tan was sentenced to 12-year jail and confiscate personal property worth 1 million yuan (~$154,000) for taking bribes worth 11 million yuan by the court.
