= Wen Qiang =

Chinese judicial official (1956–2010)

Wen Qiang (Chinese: 文强, January 29, 1956 – July 7, 2010, in Zengjia town, Shapingba, Chongqing) was a Chinese judicial official who was arrested and executed during the Chongqing gang trials.

== Career ==
Wen Qiang was the most prominent among the officials charged in Bo Xilai's campaign against organized crime in the summer of 2009. He was the former Chongqing Public Security Bureau's executive deputy head for 16 years and head of the city's Judicial Bureau (Su Wei et al., 2011:26–27). He was also known as a crime-buster, having arrested notorious gang leader and bank robber Zhang Jun in September 2000. Wen Qiang's home reportedly sat on a 20 mu lot and had a market value of 30 million yuan ("Chongqing dahei gushi," 2009).

== Prosecution and death ==
Wen was charged with taking more than 12 million yuan ($1.76 m) in bribes. He was also charged with repeatedly raping a university student. Wen was tried in February 2010, along with his wife, Zhou Xiaoya, and three other senior Chongqing police officials.

Wen was convicted and sentenced to death. His appeal in May 2010 was overturned and he was executed in July. Wen's wife and the three associates were jailed.
