= Big Data Guizhou =

Chinese provincial government strategy

Big Data Guizhou (Chinese: 贵州大数据) is a provincial strategy launched in 2014 to establish Guizhou as China's national big data hub.

== History ==
In 2014, Chen Min'er initiated the "Big Data, Big Poverty Reduction" strategy for Guizhou. Chen later added a third aspect of the strategy, "Big Ecology", to emphasise that development goals should also be pursued with careful consideration to environmental impacts.

Approved by the National Development and Reform Commission in 2016, it designated Guizhou as the country's first Pilot Zone for Big Data Comprehensive Experiments. The initiative leverages Guizhou's cool climate, low energy costs, and geopolitical stability to attract data centers, including Apple's iCloud China (operated by Guizhou-Cloud Big Data in Gui'an New District) and Huawei's Cloud Service Base.

Key projects include the Gui'an Big Data Industrial Park in 2015, hosting over 200 tech firms like Tencent and Alibaba Cloud, and the China International Big Data Industry Expo (annual since 2015). By 2023, the sector contributed 23% of Guizhou's GDP growth, creating 450,000 jobs. The province also pioneered data governance frameworks, such as the Guizhou Big Data Development Regulations in 2020, addressing data security and cross-border flow.
