= Liu Hu (journalist) =

Chinese journalist

- 刘虎
- Born: September 7, 1975 (age 50); Yubei District, Chongqing, China
- Occupation: Journalist
- Agent: New Express

Liu Hu (simplified Chinese: 刘虎; traditional Chinese: 劉虎; pinyin: Liú Hǔ; born September 7, 1975) is a Chinese journalist who was listed as one of the "One Hundred News Heroes" by Reporters Without Borders in 2014.

== Life ==
Liu Hu was born and raised in Yubei District of Chongqing.

In the middle of 2013, during the anti-corruption campaign under Xi Jinping, Liu Hu accused Ma Zhengqi (马正其; 馬正其) of corruption in real-name reporting. On August 23, 2013, Liu Hu was detained by the Beijing police for defamation, then he was held in Beijing Detention Center. On August 3, 2014, Liu Hu was awaiting the outcome of his appeal.

Liu ultimately lost his case and was forced to publish an apology and pay a fine. However, he refused to pay an additional fine levied by the court. After this case, Liu's standing in the Chinese Social Credit System was damaged, and he was effectively confined to his residence in Chongqing. His social media accounts were shut down and his ability to purchase train tickets was legally restricted.
