= Committee for Handling Proposals =

Special Committee of the CPPCC National Committee

- 中国人民政治协商会议全国委员会 提案委员会
- Formation: March 24, 1988; 38 years ago
- Type: Special committee of the CPPCC
- Location: Beijing
- Chairperson: Liu Jiayi
- Parent organization: National Committee of the Chinese People's Political Consultative Conference

Chinese name
- Simplified Chinese: 中国人民政治协商会议全国委员会提案委员会
- Traditional Chinese: 中國人民政治協商會議全國委員會提案委員會
Transcriptions
Standard Mandarin
- Hanyu Pinyin: Zhōngguó Rénmín Zhèngzhì Xiéshāng Huìyì Quánguó Wěiyuánhuì Tí'àn Wěiyuánhuì

Shortest form
- Simplified Chinese: 全国政协提案委员会
- Traditional Chinese: 全國政協提案委員會
Transcriptions
Standard Mandarin
- Hanyu Pinyin: Quánguó Zhèngxié Tí'àn Wěiyuánhuì

The Committee for Handling Proposals is one of ten special committees of the National Committee of the Chinese People's Political Consultative Conference, China's top political advisory body and a central part of the Chinese Communist Party's united front system.

== History ==
The Handling Proposals Committee was created in March 1988 during the 7th National Committee of the Chinese People's Political Consultative Conference.

== List of chairpersons ==
No.	Chairpersons	Took office	Left office	Notes
7th	Cheng Siyuan	June 1988	21 May 1993	
8th	Zhou Shaozheng	21 May 1993	16 March 1998	
9th	He Guangyuan	16 March 1998	15 March 2003	
10th	Fu Jie	15 March 2003	15 March 2008	
11th	Li Tielin	15 March 2008	13 March 2013	
12th	Sun Gan	13 March 2013	16 March 2018	
13th	Li Zhiyong	16 March 2018	13 March 2023	
14th	Liu Jiayi	13 March 2023	Incumbent	

== See also ==
- Constitution and Law Committee
