= Mayor of Chongqing =

Head of Chongqing Municipality in China

Mayor of the Chongqing Municipal People's Government
- 重庆市人民政府市长
- National Emblem of China

- Flag of China
- Incumbent; Chen Xinwu (acting) since 31 July 2026
- Chongqing Municipal People's Government
- Type: Head of government
- Status: Provincial and ministerial-level official
- Reports to: Chongqing Municipal People's Congress and its Standing Committee
- Nominator: Presidium of the Chongqing Municipal People's Congress
- Appointer: Chongqing Municipal People's Congress
- Term length: Five years, renewable
- Inaugural holder: Chen Xilian
- Formation: 2 December 1949
- Deputy: Deputy Mayors; Secretary-General

The mayor of Chongqing, officially the mayor of the Chongqing Municipal People's Government, is the head of Chongqing Municipality and leader of the Chongqing Municipal People's Government.

The mayor is elected by the Chongqing Municipal People's Congress, and responsible to it and its Standing Committee. The mayor is a provincial level official and is responsible for the overall decision-making of the municipal government. The mayor is assisted by an executive vice mayor as well as several vice mayors. The mayor generally serves as the deputy secretary of the Chongqing Municipal Committee of the Chinese Communist Party and as a member of the CCP Central Committee. The mayor the second-highest ranking official in the city after the secretary of the CCP Chongqing Committee.

The current mayor is Chen Xinwu, who took office on 31 July 2026.

== List of mayors ==
=== Republic of China ===
No.	Officeholder	Term of office		Ref.
No.	Officeholder	Took office	Left office	Ref.
Supervisor of the Chongqing Commercial Port Supervision Office
1	Yang Sen (1884–1977)	November 1921	August 1922	
Supervisor of the Chongqing Municipal Government Office
2	Deng Xihou (1889–1964)	February 1923		
3	Cheng Guodong (1879–1954)			
4	Zhu Zongque (?–?)			
Supervisor of the Chongqing Commercial Port Supervisory Office
5	Tang Shizun (1884–1950)	June 1926		
6	Pan Wenhua (1886–1950)	July 1926	1 November 1927	
Mayor of the Chongqing City Hall
(6)	Pan Wenhua (1886–1950)	1 November 1927	15 February 1929	
Mayor of the Chongqing Municipal Government
(6)	Pan Wenhua (1886–1950)	15 February 1929	June 1935	
7	Zhang Biguo (1891–1936)	24 June 1935	11 April 1936	
8	Li Hongkun (1895–1957)	1936	July 1938	
9	Jiang Zhicheng (1893–1949)	1 August 1938	5 May 1939	
Mayor of the Chongqing Municipal Government (city directly under the Central Government)
10	He Guoguang (1885–1969)	15 May 1939	5 December 1939	
11	K. C. Wu (1903–1984)	December 1939	16 December 1942	
12	He Yaozu (1889–1961)	16 December 1942	November 1945	
13	Zhang Dulun (1892–1958)	1 December 1945	April 1948	
14	Yang Sen (1884–1977)	April 1948	30 November 1949	

=== People's Republic of China ===
No.	Officeholder	Term of office		Political party	Ref.
No.	Officeholder	Took office	Left office	Political party	Ref.
Director of the People's Liberation Army Military Control Commission of Chongqing Municipality
1	Zhang Jichun (1900–1968)	3 December 1949	?	Chinese Communist Party	
Mayor of the Chongqing Municipal People's Government
1	Chen Xilian (1915–1995)	2 December 1949	September 1950	Chinese Communist Party	
2	Cao Diqiu (1909–1976)	December 1951	19 June 1954	Chinese Communist Party	
Mayor of the Chongqing Municipal People's Government (province-level city of Sichuan)
(2)	Cao Diqiu (1909–1976)	19 June 1954	January 1955	Chinese Communist Party	
3	Ren Baige (1906–1986)	January 1955	July 1966	Chinese Communist Party	
Director of the Chongqing Revolutionary Committee
4	Lan Yinong (1919–2008)	May 1968	December 1968	Chinese Communist Party	
5	Duan Siying (1917–2007)	December 1968	1969	Chinese Communist Party	
6	He Yunfeng (1922–2013)	1969	December 1973	Chinese Communist Party	
7	Lu Dadong (1915–1998)	December 1973	1978	Chinese Communist Party	
8	Qian Min (1915–2016)	May 1978	August 1978	Chinese Communist Party	
9	Ding Changhe (born 1934)	1978	March 1980	Chinese Communist Party	
Mayor of the Chongqing Municipal People's Government (province-level city of Sichuan)
10	Yu Hanqing (1929–2011)	March 1980	May 1985	Chinese Communist Party	
11	Xiao Yang (1929–1998)	May 1985	August 1988	Chinese Communist Party	
12	Sun Tongchuan (born 1940)	August 1988	April 1993	Chinese Communist Party	
13	Liu Zhizhong (born 1942)	May 1993	September 1996	Chinese Communist Party	
–	Pu Haiqing (born 1941)	September 1996	June 1999	Chinese Communist Party	
Mayor of the Chongqing Municipal People's Government
14	Pu Haiqing (born 1941)	19 June 1997	June 1999	Chinese Communist Party	
15	Bao Xuding (born 1939)	June 1999	October 2002	Chinese Communist Party	
16	Wang Hongju (born 1945)	January 2003 (acting from October 2002)	November 2009	Chinese Communist Party	
17	Huang Qifan (born 1952)	30 November 2009	30 December 2016	Chinese Communist Party	
18	Zhang Guoqing (born 1964)	30 December 2016	2 January 2018	Chinese Communist Party	
19	Tang Liangzhi (born 1960)	2 January 2018	30 December 2021	Chinese Communist Party	
20	Hu Henghua (born 1963)	30 December 2021	27 May 2026	Chinese Communist Party	
21	Chen Xinwu (born 1968)	31 July 2026 (acting)	Incumbent	Chinese Communist Party	
