= Diaobingshan =

Diaobingshan 调兵山市
- County-level city
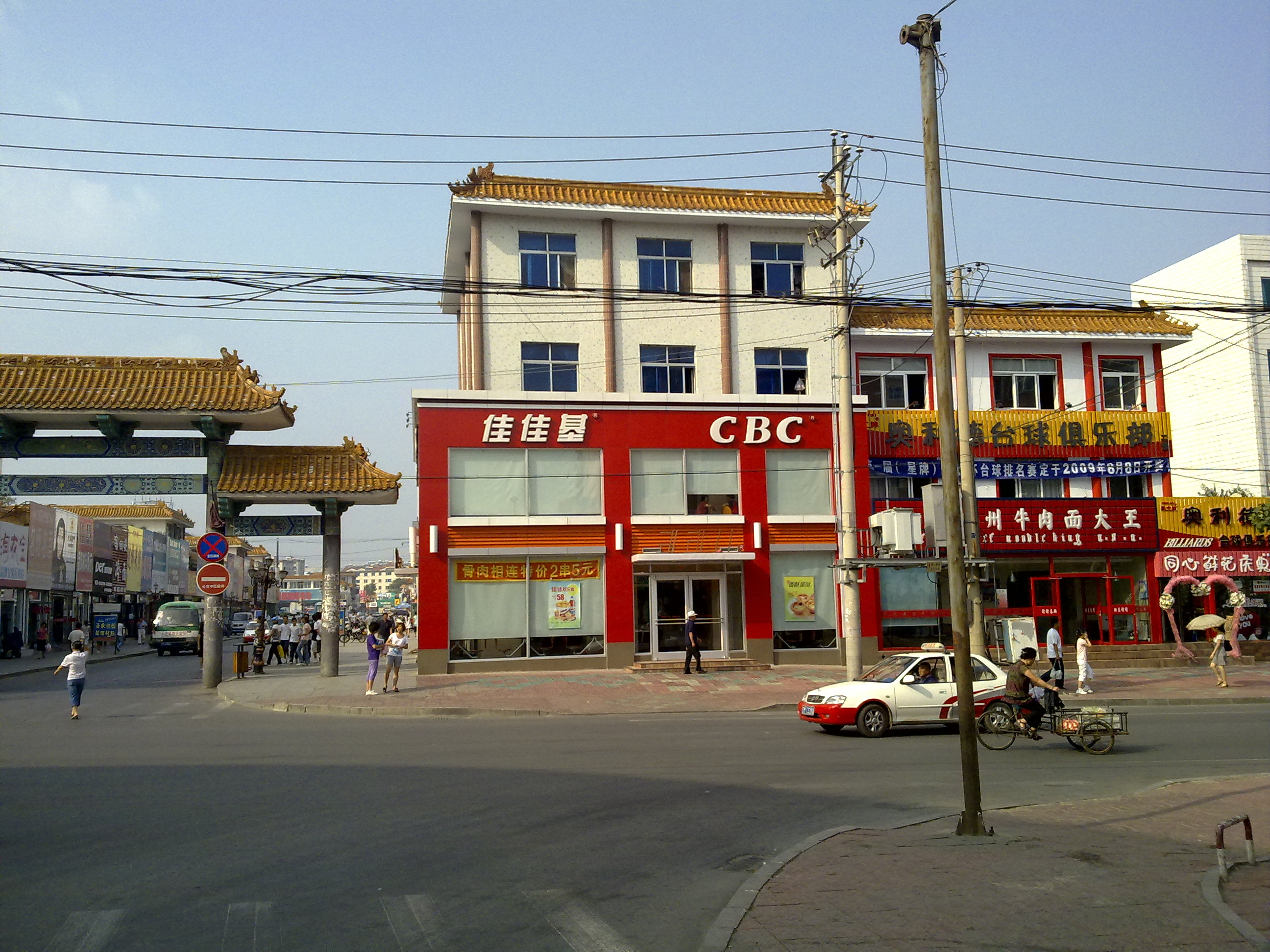

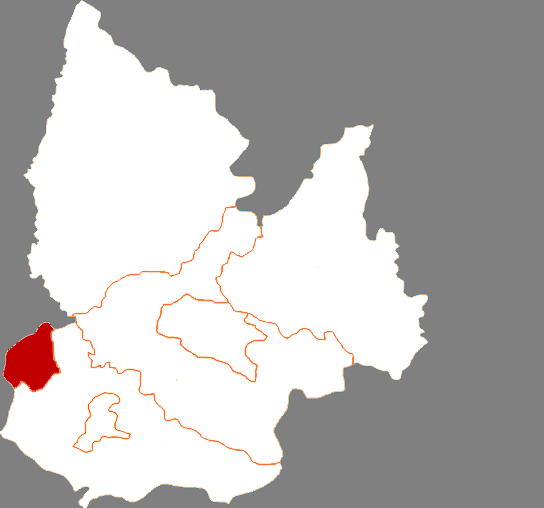
- Location in Tieling

- Location in Liaoning
- Coordinates: 42°28′N 123°34′E
- Country: People's Republic of China
- Province: Liaoning
- Prefecture-level city: Tieling

Area
  - Total: 262.7 km^{2} (101.4 sq mi)

Population (2020 census)
  - Total: 206,058
  - Density: 784.4/km^{2} (2,032/sq mi)
- Time zone: UTC+8 (China Standard)
- Website: www.lndbss.gov.cn

Diaobingshan (simplified Chinese: 调兵山; traditional Chinese: 調兵山; pinyin: Diàobīngshān) is a city in the northeast of Liaoning province in Northeast China. It is under the administration of Tieling City, which lies 30 kilometres (19 mi) to the southeast. In 2020 the population was 206,058.

The city was established as Tiefa City (Chinese: 铁法市; pinyin: Tiěfǎ shì), a compound name of nearby Tieling City and Faku County, in 1982 as a coal production base. In 2002 it was renamed to Diaobingshan, which is the name of a mountain west of the city. Diaobingshan, which can be translated as 'troops dispatching mountain' is named for troop movements during the Jin dynasty being dispatched from here.

== Administrative divisions ==
There are seven towns under the city's administration.

Towns:

- Bingshan (兵山镇)
- Daming (大明镇)
- Gushanzi (孤山子镇)
- Tiefa (铁法镇)
- Xiaoming (晓明镇)
- Xiaonan (晓南镇)
- Xiaoqing (小青镇)
