= Pu Haiqing =

Chinese politician

- 蒲海清

Mayor of Chongqing
- In office 18 June 1997 – June 1999
- Preceded by: Liu Zhizhong
- Succeeded by: Bao Xuding

Personal details
- Born: December 1941 (age 84) Nanbu County, Sichuan, China
- Party: Chinese Communist Party
- Education: Chongqing University

Pu Haiqing (Chinese: 蒲海清; pinyin: Pú Hǎiqīng; born December 1941) is a Chinese politician who spent served as mayor of Chongqing from 1997 to 1999. He was a delegate to the 9th and 10th National People's Congress, and a member of the Standing Committee of the 11th National People's Congress. He was a member of the 15th and 16th Central Committee of the Chinese Communist Party.

== Biography ==
Pu was born in Nanbu County, Sichuan, in December 1941. In 1961, he entered Chongqing University, majoring in steel rolling. After university in December 1968, he was assigned to the Fourth Branch of Chongqing Iron and Steel Company (later renamed Chongqing Iron and Steel Group Corporation). He moved up the ranks to become factory deputy director in September 1979 and general manager of Chongqing Iron and Steel Group Corporation in December 1982.

He joined the Chinese Communist Party (CCP) in November 1973, and got involved in politics in January 1985, when he was appointed deputy director of Sichuan Provincial Economic Commission, and three months later was promoted to the director position. He also served as vice governor of Sichuan. He was appointed executive vice governor in March 1992 and was admitted to member of the Standing Committee of the CCP Sichuan Provincial Committee, the province's top authority. In February 1996, he was made executive deputy party secretary. In September 1996, he was named acting mayor of Chongqing, confirmed in June 1997. He was director and CCP Committee Secretary of the State Bureau of Metallurgical Industry in June 1996, and held that office until February 2001. He served as deputy director of the Three Gorges Project Committee of the State Council in February 2001, and two years later promoted to the director position. In March 2008, he took office as vice chairperson of the National People's Congress Environment Protection and Resources Conservation Committee.

Government offices
Preceded by Liu Zhizhong	Mayor of Chongqing; 1997–1999	Succeeded by Bao Xuding
Preceded by Guo Shuyan	Director of the Three Gorges Project Committee of the State Council; 2003–2006	Succeeded by Wang Xiaofeng
