= Bao Xuding =

Chinese politician

- 包叙定

Mayor of Chongqing
- In office June 1999 – October 2002
- Party Secretary: He Guoqiang
- Preceded by: Pu Haiqing
- Succeeded by: Wang Hongju

Minister of Machinery Industry
- In office March 1996 – August 1998
- Premier: Li Peng; Zhu Rongji
- Preceded by: He Guangyuan
- Succeeded by: Position revoked

Personal details
- Born: February 1939 (age 87) Wuxi, Jiangsu, China
- Party: Chinese Communist Party
- Education: Shenyang Machinery Industry School; Central Party School of the Chinese Communist Party

Bao Xuding (Chinese: 包叙定; pinyin: Bāo Xùdìng; born February 1939) is a Chinese politician who served as minister of Machinery Industry from 1996 to 1998 and mayor of Chongqing from 1999 to 2002.

He was a member of the 15th Central Committee of the Chinese Communist Party. He was a member of the Standing Committee of the 10th Chinese People's Political Consultative Conference.

== Biography ==
Bao was born in Wuxi, Jiangsu, in February 1939.

He entered the workforce in September 1958, and joined the Chinese Communist Party (CCP) in January 1961. He was deputy director of Sichuan Machinery Industry Bureau (later renamed Sichuan Provincial Machinery Industry Department) in 1975, and was elevated to director in 1986. In 1988, he was appointed director of Sichuan Provincial Planned Economy Commission, but having held the position for only two years.

In 1990, he became vice minister of Machinery Industry, rising to minister in March 1996. In 1998, he became deputy head of the National Development and Reform Commission, a post he kept until 1999.

He was appointed deputy party secretary of Chongqing in June 1999, concurrently holding the mayor position.

Government offices
Preceded by He Guangyuan	Minister of Machinery Industry; 1996–1998	Succeeded by Position revoked
Preceded by Pu Haiqing	Mayor of Chongqing; 1999–2002	Succeeded by Wang Hongju
