= Shaoxing University =

University in Shaoxing, China

- 绍兴大学
- Former names: Shaoxing Teachers College; Shaoxing Advanced Professional College Shankuai Primary Normal School
- Motto in English: Cultivating Virtue and Seeking Truth
- Type: Public university
- Established: 1909
- President: Ye Feifan
- Total staff: 2,000
- Location: Shaoxing, Zhejiang, China
- Campus: 166.25 hectares (410.8 acres); Multiple sites
- Colours
- Website: www.usx.edu.cn

Shaoxing University
- Simplified Chinese: 绍兴大学
- Traditional Chinese: 紹興大學
Transcriptions
Standard Mandarin
- Hanyu Pinyin: Shàoxīng Wénlǐ Xuéyuàn

Shaoxing University (simplified Chinese: 绍兴大学; traditional Chinese: 紹興大學) is located in Shaoxing, Zhejiang, China.

== History ==
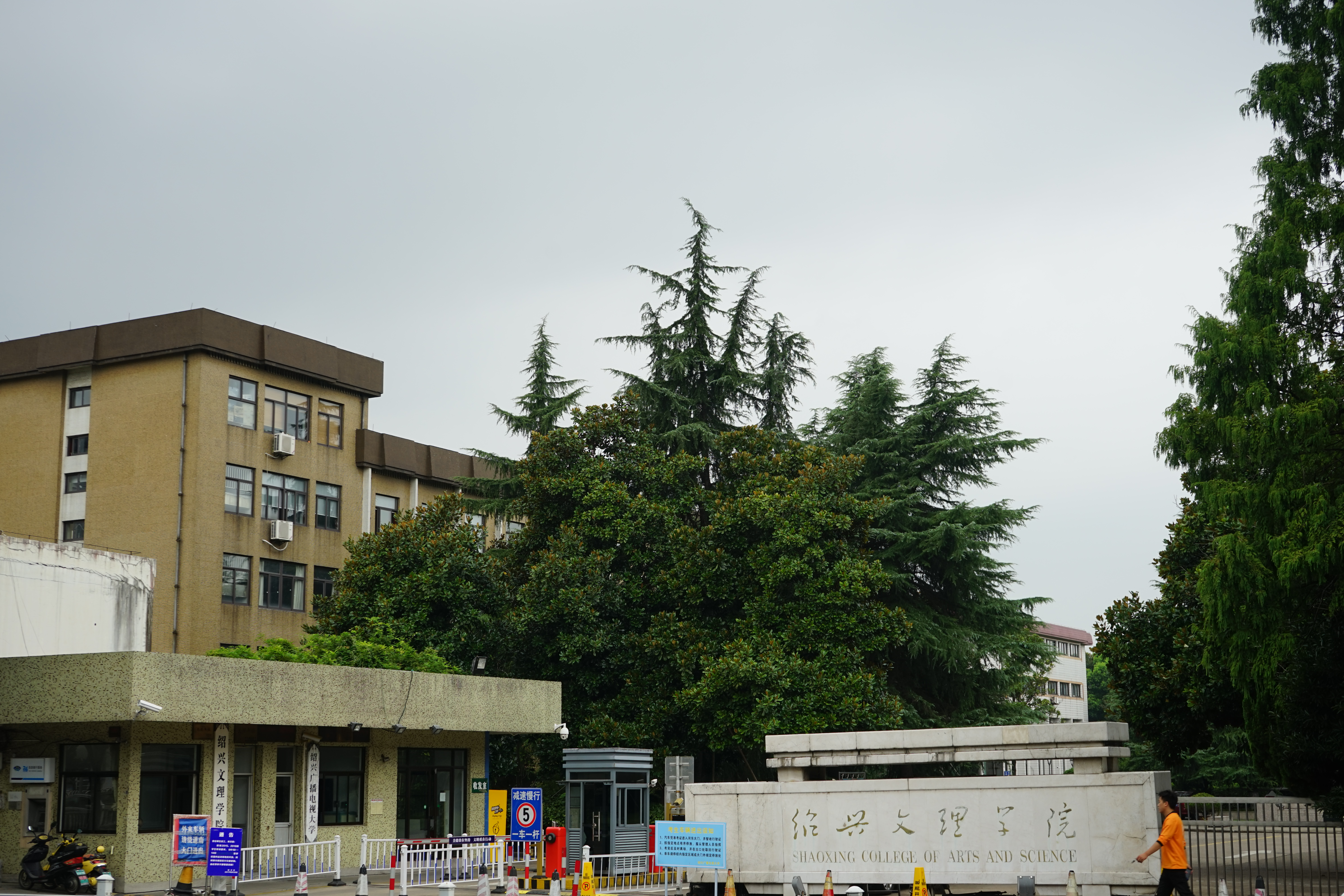
East Campus， Shaoxing College of Arts and Science

The University is located on the south-west side of Shaoxing city and has managed to grow in popularity and strength over the last decade. The University was founded in 1909 as the Shankuai Primary Normal School. The influential modern Chinese author Lu Xun (1881-1936) is a native of Shaoxing. He was the education inspector for the school. In 1996, Shaoxing University was established from the merger of several higher education institutions such as Shaoxing Teachers College and Shaoxing Advanced Professional College. On 4 February 2026, the university changed its Chinese name following approval from the Ministry of Education.

== Administration ==
The university is organized into the following administrative divisions.

=== Administrative offices ===
- President's Office
- Office of International Cooperation and Exchange
- Academic Affairs Office
- Admission and Graduate Affairs Office
- Student Affairs Office
- Science and Technology Administration Office
- Press Release Center
- Human Resources Department
- Retired Personnel Affairs Office
- Security and Safeguard Department
- Finance Department
- University Enterprise Administration Office
- General Affairs Office
- University Assets Administration Office
- Construction and Campus Planning Office
- Maintenance and Campus Administration Office

== Colleges and departments ==
The university is organized into the following colleges and departments.

- Faculty of Foreign Languages
- Faculty of Law
- Cai Yuanpei Art College
- Faculty of Physical Education
- Faculty of Economics and Business Administration
- Faculty of Mathematics Physics and Information Science
- Faculty of Engineering
- Faculty of medical Science
- Shangyu College
- College of Primary Education
- Department of Chinese Language and literature
- Department of Chemistry
- Department of Biology
- Department of Pedagogy
- Yuanpei college
- College of Adult Education
- Orchid Pavilion Calligraphy College
- College of Private Business Management
- College of Vocational Training
