= Three Stricts and Three Honests =

Chinese Communist Party internal campaign

The Three Stricts, Three Honests (Chinese: 三严三实) is an internal education campaign led by the Chinese Communist Party (CCP) advanced by General Secretary, Xi Jinping, in 2014, aimed at improving the ethical conduct of party officials and "improving political ecology". The campaign was essentially a response against perceived moral laxity in the Communist rank and file which has, over the years, according to the party itself, distanced government officials from ordinary people they were supposed to serve.

The campaign was also aimed at tackling the endemic careerism, collusion between business and political elites, rent-seeking by officials, and superficiality that became pervasive in Chinese politics. It took place in the backdrop of the wider anti-corruption campaign, creating a culture where officials "don't want to be corrupt, don't dare to be corrupt, and don't have the means to be corrupt."

== History ==
On March 9, 2014, when attending the deliberation of the Anhui delegation at the second session of the 12th National People's Congress, General Secretary Xi Jinping proposed a 24-character requirement for the work style of cadres: "strict self-cultivation, strict use of power, strict self-discipline, and be earnest in planning, starting a business, and being a person." This requirement was later taken as an important topic of education within the Party, and was officially referred to as "Three Stricts and Three Earnests."

On April 19, 2015, the General Office of the CCP Central Committee issued a "Plan for Carrying out the Special Education on "Three Stricts and Three Earnests" among Leading Cadres at or above the County and Department Level" and issued a notice. It required all regions and units to "grasp both" the special education and daily work, and "not neglect either." Among them, "strict in self-cultivation, strict in the use of power, strict in self-discipline; be realistic in planning, entrepreneurship, and being a person" was officially summarized as "Three Stricts and Three Earnests". Since 2015, a party-wide "education campaign" began under the general secretaryship of Xi Jinping and the senior official in charge of party affairs, Liu Yunshan, to instill these ideas in officials of all levels.

== Concept ==
The "three honests" are:

- Be honest in making decisions (谋事要实, also can be translated as "be honest in doing things")
- Be honest in forging a career (创业要实, also translated as "be honest in business")
- Be honest in personal behavior (做人要实)

The "three stricts" are:

- Be strict in moral conduct (严以修身, also can be translated as "be strict in self-cultivation")
- Be strict in exercising power (严以用权)
- Be strict in disciplining oneself (严以律己)

== Main Activities ==
Main activities of the campaign included:

- the Party Committee Secretary taking the lead in giving a special lecture on "Three Stricts and Three Earnests";
- carrying out thematic study and discussion;
- convening special democratic life meetings and organizational life meetings;
- Strengthening rectification and implementation and enforcing rules and regulations.

== See also ==
- Ideology of the Chinese Communist Party
