= Xiong Xue =

Chinese politician

- 熊雪

Vice Mayor of Chongqing
- In office May 2019 – January 2023
- Mayor: Tang Liangzhi; Hu Henghua

Personal details
- Born: December 1962 (age 63) Yubei District, Chongqing, China
- Party: Chinese Communist Party (1984–2023; expelled)
- Education: Chongqing No. 1 Normal College

Xiong Xue (Chinese: 熊雪; pinyin: Xióng Xuě; born December 1962) is a former Chinese politician who spent his entire career in southwest China's Chongqing city. He was investigated by China's top anti-graft agency in May 2023. Previously he served as vice mayor of Chongqing.

== Early life and education ==
Xiong was born in Yubei District, Chongqing, in December 1962. In 1979, he enrolled at Chongqing No. 1 Normal College, where he majored in Chinese.

== Career ==
After graduating in 1982, he was despatched to the Nan'an District Committee of the Communist Youth League of China. He joined the Chinese Communist Party (CCP) in June 1984. He moved up the ranks to become deputy secretary in August 1984 and secretary in June 1988. He was director of Nan'an District Sports Committee in March 1992, director of the Office of the CCP Nan'an District Committee in September 1994 and subsequently deputy governor of Nan'an District in July 1995. In November 2004, he was named acting mayor of Jiangjin (now Jiangjin District), confirmed in February 2005. He was deputy secretary of the Party Working Committee and deputy director of the Management Committee of Chongqing High-tech Zone in December 2006, in addition to serving as deputy director of Chongqing Liangjiang New Area Management Committee. In November 2013, he rose to become party secretary of Yongchuan District. He was director of Chongqing Municipal Commission of Commerce in September 2016 and subsequently director of Chongqing Development and Reform Commission in March 2018. He was elevated to vice mayor of Chongqing in May 2019.

== Downfall ==
On 11 May 2023, he was suspected of "serious violations of laws and regulations" by the Central Commission for Discipline Inspection (CCDI), the party's internal disciplinary body, and the National Supervisory Commission, the highest anti-corruption agency of China. On November 13, he was expelled from the CCP and was arrested by the Supreme People's Procuratorate.

On 10 April 2024, Xiong was indicted on suspicion of accepting bribes. On September 26, he stood trial at the Intermediate People's Court of Zhengzhou on charges of taking bribes, prosecutors accused him of taking advantage of his different positions in Chongqing between 1999 and 2023 to seek profits for various companies and individuals in engineering contracting and land use approval, in return, he accepted money and property worth over million yuan 148 million yuan ($20.65million) personally or through his family members. On December 17, he was sentenced to death with a two-year reprieve for taking bribes, he was deprived of his political rights for life, and all his personal assets were confiscated.

Government offices
New title	Director of Chongqing Municipal Commission of Commerce; 2016–2018	Succeeded by Zhang Zhikui (张智奎)
Preceded by Shen Xiaozhong (沈晓钟)	Director of Chongqing Development and Reform Commission; 2018–2019	Succeeded by Zheng Xiangdong
Party political offices
Preceded by Jiang Youyi (蒋又一)	Communist Party Secretary of Yongchuan District; 2013–2016	Succeeded by Teng Hongwei (滕宏伟)
