= Qingdao Agricultural University =

University in Qingdao, China

Coordinates: 36.3188°N 120.3913°E

- 青岛农业大学
- Former name: Laiyang Agricultural College
- Motto: 厚德、博学、笃行、致远
- Type: Public
- Established: 1951; 75 years ago
- President: Song Xiyun (宋希云)
- Party Secretary: Li Baodu (李宝笃)
- Academic staff: 1,510
- Undergraduates: 33,600
- Postgraduates: 1,400
- Location: Chengyang District, Qingdao, Shandong, 266100, China
- Website: www.qau.edu.cn

Qingdao Agricultural University (QAU; simplified Chinese: 青岛农业大学; traditional Chinese: 青島農業大學; pinyin: Qīngdǎo Nóngyè Dàxué) is a public university based in Qingdao and Laiyang district of Yantai, Shandong province, China. Founded in 1951 and formerly known as Laiyang Agricultural College, the school was awarded university status in 1999. Most of the majors offered are in the agricultural and engineering sciences. A new campus in Pingdu will be operated in September 2019.

== History ==
Qingdao Agricultural University, formerly known as Laiyang Agricultural College, was founded in 1951.

It was first named Laiyang Agricultural School (June 1951 – September 1958), then Laiyang Agricultural College (September 1958 – September 1963), Laiyang Agricultural School (September 1963 – May 1976), Laiyang Agricultural University (May 1976 – April 1978), Laiyang Agricultural College (April 1978 – March 2007), and finally Qingdao Agricultural University (March 2007 – present).

== Campus ==
QAU enjoys three campuses and one farm. Two campuses in Qingdao and the other in Laiyang. The farm in Jiaozhou. They boast ideal geographic location, beautiful sceneries and rich cultures. For perfect cultural atmosphere, QAU's campus is awarded Shandong Civil Campus. The campus of QAU covers an area of around 286 ha. with the building floorage of 1.1+ million square meters.

== Academic ==
QAU comprises 22 schools (departments), 77 full-time four-year undergraduate majors or specialities, 13 first-level disciplines of postgraduate programs, 78 second-level disciplines of postgraduate programs and three professional postgraduate programs. QAU has a total enrollment of 35,000, including 1,400 graduate students. QAU Equipment gross is over CNY257+ million. QAU library has a total collection of 2,179,600 books, and 2,486,300 e-books.

QAU has developed herself into a well-balanced comprehensive university, covering sciences, engineering, agriculture, humanities, arts, law, management, economics etc. QAU was awarded EXCELLENT in the National Undergraduate Teaching Assessment of the Ministry of Education. QAU features in science and technology innovation and fruitful achievements. QAU was ranked 34 nationally in the National Higher Learning Institutions Real Income List from Science and Technology Transfer in 2002. QAU topped the other universities in Shandong Province.

== Schools and departments ==
- Agriculture and Plant Protection
- Animal Science and Technology
- Animation and Communication
- Art
- Chemistry and Pharmacy
- Civil Engineering and Architecture
- Continuing Education
- Cooperatives
- Economics and Management
- Food Science and Engineering
- Foreign Languages
- Haidu College
- Horticulture
- Humanities and Social Sciences
- International Education
- Landscaping and Forestry
- Life Sciences
- Marine Science and Engineering
- Mechanical and Electrical Engineering
- Natural Resources and Environment
- Physical Education
- Science and Information Science
