= Tiefa =

Town in Liaoning Province, China

Tiefa 铁法镇
- Town
- Location in Liaoning
- Coordinates: 42°26′52″N 123°32′31″E
- Country: People's Republic of China
- Province: Liaoning
- Prefecture-level city: Tieling
- County-level city: Diaobingshan
- Time zone: UTC+8 (China Standard)

Tiefa (simplified Chinese: 铁法镇; traditional Chinese: 鐵法鎮; pinyin: Tiěfǎ Zhèn) is a town in Diaobingshan, in the north of Liaoning Province in Northeast China. Located 30 kilometres (19 mi) northwest of Tieling City and 72 kilometres (45 mi) north of Shenyang, the provincial capital, it is a coal production centre. Diaobingshan was known as Tiefa until 2002.
