= Zhang Guoqing =

Chinese Vice Premier

- 张国清
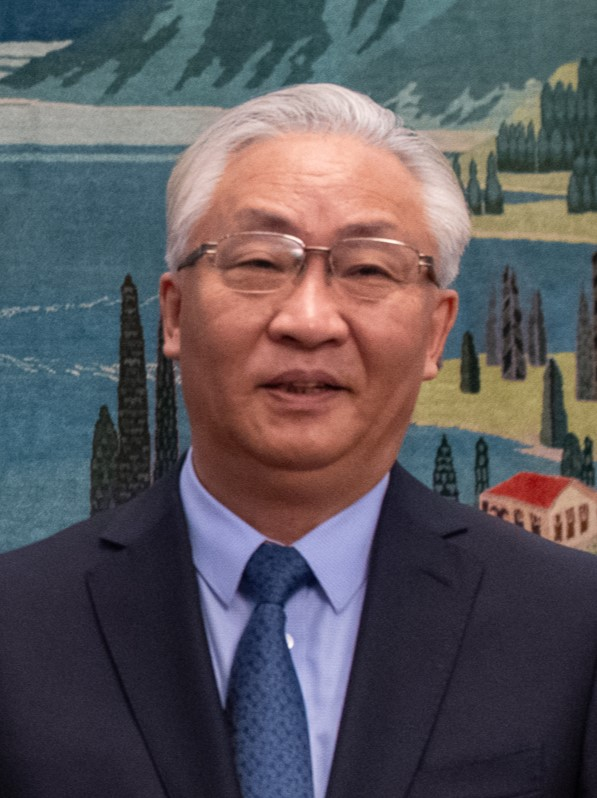
- Zhang in 2023

Vice Premier of China
- Incumbent
- Assumed office 12 March 2023 Serving with Ding Xuexiang, He Lifeng, Liu Guozhong
- Premier: Li Qiang

Party Secretary of Liaoning
- In office 1 September 2020 – 28 November 2022
- Deputy: Liu Ning → Li Lecheng (Governor)
- General Secretary: Xi Jinping
- Preceded by: Chen Qiufa
- Succeeded by: Hao Peng

Mayor of Tianjin
- In office 2 January 2018 – 3 September 2020
- Party Secretary: Li Hongzhong
- Preceded by: Wang Dongfeng
- Succeeded by: Liao Guoxun

Mayor of Chongqing
- In office 30 December 2016 – 2 January 2018
- Party Secretary: Sun Zhengcai → Chen Min'er
- Preceded by: Huang Qifan
- Succeeded by: Tang Liangzhi

Personal details
- Born: August 1964 (age 62) Luoshan County, Henan, China
- Party: Chinese Communist Party
- Education: Changchun University of Science and Technology (BS); Nanjing University of Science and Technology (MS)
- Cabinet: Li Qiang Government

Zhang Guoqing (Chinese: 张国清; pinyin: Zhāng Guóqīng; born 13 August 1964) is a Chinese politician and former corporate executive who has served as vice premier of China since March 2023 and a member of the Politburo of the Chinese Communist Party since October 2022.

Previously, Zhang served as the mayor of Tianjin, one of the four direct-controlled municipalities of China. An economics doctorate from Tsinghua University, Zhang had previously served as the Party Secretary of Liaoning, mayor of Chongqing, the chief executive of North Industries, a military contractor.

== Early life ==
Zhang was born in 1964 in the town of Lingshan, Luoshan County, Henan province. He studied electrical engineering at the Changchun Institute of Optical Mechanics (now Changchun University of Science and Technology) and graduated in 1985. After graduating, he pursued a master's degree from the Nanjing University of Science and Technology in international trade.

== Corporate career ==
Zhang worked at Norinco, a state-owned enterprise in the military sector for decades. He began work as a project manager, then worked in the company's operations in the Middle East, including a stint in the company's office in Tehran as the assistant to the general representative. He later became the deputy director and director of the Middle East region. In 1995, he became a deputy general manager of the company's International Trade Department. He was promoted to vice president in 1996, and by 1998, he had become the Party Secretary of the company, first-in-charge. He also became vice chairman and later chairman of the Board of China Wanbao Engineering Ltd.

In 1999, Zhang began work for the China North Industries Group Corporation as member of the Party Leadership Group and Deputy General Manager. By April 2004 he was promoted to chief executive of North Industries. During this time he also earned a doctorate in economics from Tsinghua University. Between September and November 2001 he took part in an executive management course at Harvard Business School.

In 2007, Zhang was named an alternate of the 17th Central Committee of the Chinese Communist Party, and was one of the youngest members with a seat on the body (he was only 42 at the time). During Zhang's tenure, the North Industries became the first military industry group to reach an annual 300 billion yuan operating revenue in 2011. By 2012, China North Industries had secured a place in the Fortune Global 500. In 2012, he became a full member of the 18th CCP Central Committee.

== Political career ==
In April 2013, Zhang took on a political office for the first time in his life, and was named deputy party chief of Chongqing; three months later he also took on the role of president of the Chongqing party school, which is customary for deputy party chiefs of a jurisdiction. Along with Ma Xingrui, Zhang was the only provincial-level deputy party chief with a full seat on the 18th Central Committee.

In January 2016, during his inspection of the Chongqing State-owned Assets Supervision and Administration Commission, Zhang stated guidance should be provided based on the actual situation of state-owned enterprises. In April 2016, he paid an inspection trip to the Chongqing Chemical and Pharmaceutical Holding Company, he called on efforts to be made to steadily advance supply-side structural reforms. In December 2016, Zhang was appointed the acting mayor of Chongqing.

In December 2017, Zhang was appointed the CCP Deputy Secretary of Tianjin. Later, he was appointed Mayor in January 2018.

On September 1, 2020, Zhang was appointed the CCP Secretary of Liaoning.

Zhang is seen as a promising candidate for the "6th generation of Chinese leadership". Compared to his contemporaries, Zhang's background is unusual in that much of his career was spent as a corporate executive rather than in politics.

=== Vice Premier ===
After the 20th Party National Congress, he was elected as a member of the CCP Politburo. On 12 March 2023, he was appointed a vice premier of China. His portfolio consisted of industry and information technology, emergency management, and state-owned enterprises.

In June 2023, Zhang paid an inspection trip to various manufacturing companies in Shanghai, where he calling on them to move up the value chain and speed up breakthroughs in key technologies. In August 2023, he visited Heilongjiang to inspect flood control efforts. He visited Russia to attend the Eastern Economic Forum in Vladivostok in September 2023, where he met with Russian President Vladimir Putin. After earthquakes in Gansu in December 2023, Zhang oversaw the rescue efforts.

In January 2024, after landslides in Liangshui in Zhenxiong County, Yunnan, Zhang was sent by Xi as a delegation to the scene. In December 2024, Zhang visited Iran, where he met with Iranian President Masoud Pezeshkian. In February 2025, Zhang attended the 2025 Artificial Intelligence Action Summit in Paris, France. He stated China's willingness to work with other countries to safeguard security and share achievements in the field of artificial intelligence to build "a community with a shared future for mankind". In October 2025, Zhang visited Zhejiang, where he called for enterprises to apply artificial intelligence technologies to research and development, design, product manufacturing and process optimisation.

Business positions
Preceded by Ma Zhigeng	Chairman of China North Industries Group Corporation Limited; 2008–2013	Succeeded by Yin Jiaxu
Party political offices
Preceded by Zhang Xuan	Specifically-designated Deputy Party Secretary of Chongqing; 2013–2016	Succeeded by Tang Liangzhi
Preceded by Chen Qiufa	Party Secretary of Liaoning; 2020–2022	Succeeded by Hao Peng
Government offices
Preceded by Huang Qifan	Mayor of Chongqing; 2016–2018	Succeeded by Tang Liangzhi
Preceded by Wang Dongfeng	Mayor of Tianjin; 2018–2020	Succeeded by Liao Guoxun
Assembly seats
Preceded by Chen Qiufa	Chairman of Liaoning People's Congress; 2021–2023	Succeeded by Hao Peng
Order of precedence
Preceded by Li Ganjie as Member of the Politburo of the Chinese Communist Party	Order of precedence of China as Member of the Politburo of the Chinese Communist Party	Succeeded by Li Shulei as Member of the Politburo of the Chinese Communist Party
