= Chongqing gang trials =

Campaign against organized crime in China

- Chongqing is a large municipality in China's interior.
- Traditional Chinese: 重慶打黑除惡專項行動
- Simplified Chinese: 重庆打黑除恶专项行动
- Literal meaning: Targeted actions against dark and evil forces in Chongqing
Transcriptions
Standard Mandarin
- Hanyu Pinyin: Chóngqìng dǎ hēi chú è zhuānxiàng xíngdòng
- IPA: [ʈʂʰʊ̌ŋtɕʰîŋ tà xéɪ ʈʂʰǔ ɤ̂ ʈʂwánɕjâŋ ɕǐŋtʊ̂ŋ]

The Chongqing gang trials (or dahei campaign) were a series of triad-busting trials in the city of Chongqing that began in October 2009 and concluded in 2011. Carried out under the auspices of municipal Communist Party chief Bo Xilai and police chief Wang Lijun, a total of 4,781 suspects were arrested, including 19 suspected crime bosses, hundreds of triad members, and a number of allegedly corrupt police, government and Communist party officials, including six district police chiefs and the city's former deputy police commissioner, Wen Qiang. Time described it as "China's trial of the 21st century". The crackdown is believed to be the largest of its kind in the history of the People's Republic of China. Concerns over due process surfaced following the trial, including allegations of torture, forced confessions, and intimidation.

The trials earned significant media attention for local party chief Bo Xilai, and its implications partially contributed to Bo's downfall in March 2012. Police chief Wang Lijun was also later convicted of abuse of power and went to prison.

== Background ==
Chongqing had been a center for gang activities prior to the advent of Communism in China. When the Communist Party came to power in 1949, it cracked down on organized crime, almost eliminating it. After liberalization under Deng Xiaoping, gangs made a comeback in the city, this time with associates within the Communist Party.

Politburo member Bo Xilai, the head of the Communist Party in Chongqing since November 2007, made "cleaning up the city" a priority, bringing in trusted outside aides such as Wang Lijun to lead the crackdown on gangs and corruption.

== Impact and response ==
Over 9,000 suspects were investigated, including 50 public officials. Fourteen of these were high-ranking officials, including members of the Chongqing Higher People's Court. Several members of the police force were also detained, including Wen Qiang, the former director of the Chongqing Municipal Bureau of Justice and the bureau's party chief, as well as former deputy police commissioner. By 6 November 2009, over 800 people had warrants issued for their arrest and 327 were prosecuted.

The first 31 defendants were brought to trial on 12 October 2009, nine in Chongqing's First Intermediate People's Court and another 22 at the Third Intermediate People's Court. Charges included murder, assault, and operating illegal coal mines. On 21 October, three of the defendants in the first round of trials (Yang Tianqing, Liu Chenghu, and Liu Zhongyong) were sentenced to death, and another three were given suspended death sentences. The other 25 defendants were sentenced to jail terms ranging from one year to life.

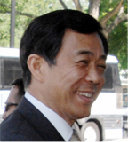
Bo Xilai, party chief of Chongqing, led the crackdown

The highest-profile defendant has been deputy police commissioner Wen Qiang's sister-in-law, Xie Caiping (Chinese: 谢才萍), reputedly the ringleader of the syndicate and dubbed the "Godmother of Chongqing". Xie, 46, reputedly kept 16 young men as lovers. She and 22 accomplices were brought to trial on 14 October. During the trial, a judge rebuked her for profanity in her testimony. This, combined with the rumours of her lovers, have increased the public's interest in her case. On 3 November she was sentenced to 18 years in prison for running a crime syndicate that operated illegal gambling dens, illegally locked people up, harboured drug users, ran protection rackets, and bribed police. Though she won a five-year decrease in her original sentence by confessing to her crimes, she intends to appeal the court ruling.

On 19 October the 23-year-old twin brothers Zhang Bo and Zhang Tao were arraigned in the Chongqing Municipal Intermediate People's Court with 21 accomplices. On 6 November, each of the brothers was sentenced to serve 17 years in prison, with members of the syndicate receiving jail sentences of between 6 months and 13 1/2 years.

In March 2010, Chongqing's police bureau saw an upheaval in jobs. On 8 March, the reform was publicized in a plenary conference and circulated on the police's internal website. Many, if not all, of the leadership positions have been opened to competition. Three new deputy directors were named in September 2009 and January and March 2010. Additionally, there are plans to hire over 7700 new policemen in 2010.

The trial of Wen Qiang concluded on 14 April 2010, with the Fifth Intermediate People's Court of Chongqing announcing that Wen would be given the death penalty for his crimes, which include accepting bribes, rape, and failure to account for his assets. Previously, the Court had recovered over 30 million yuan ($4.38 million) of Wen's assets, some of which was found hidden in a vault. Other assets recovered included a mansion in the Xiannu Mountain district of Chongqing. The announcement of Wen's death sentence was met with cheers and exuberance outside the courtroom by victims and other Chongqing citizens. Wen's wife, Zhou Xiaoya, confessed to accepting bribes of some 4.5 million yuan, and was sentenced to eight years in prison. Several of Wen's cohorts were also sentenced. Wen Qiang, along with his wife and three others, appealed the decision. Wen lost the appeal in May, when the court announced the clear evidence against him, and he was executed in July 2010.

=== Concerns about due process ===
Some liberal Chinese media sources, including Southern Weekend, Caixin and Sanlian Life Week, have complained that in a rush to secure convictions, authorities are not fully heeding the legal requirements of due process. In December 2009 defence lawyer, Li Zhuang was arrested and accused of "coaching his client (Gong Gangmo) to make false claims of torture". Li was sentenced to 18 months in prison and barred for life from practising law. On 27 July 2010, another lawyer, Zhu Mingyong, released videotapes of his client Fan Qihang accusing authorities of torturing him almost every day for six months. Fan, 39 years old and accused of running a crime syndicate, had already been convicted and sentenced to death following his arrest in June 2009. Fan said he was beaten, deprived of sleep and placed in stress positions for long periods of time. He said that after he tried to kill himself and bite off his own tongue, guards delayed his medical treatment for two days. His lawyer Zhu hoped to use the video evidence to persuade the Supreme People's Court, which reviewed the case in mid-2010, to reverse the death sentence on his client. Fan was subsequently executed.

== Legacy ==
The removal of large numbers of gangsters created a noticeable improvement in public safety but experts and locals think the results are unlikely to be permanent, as new crime bosses are expected to emerge.

== See also ==
- Special Campaign to Crack Down on Organized Crime and Eliminate Evil
- Corruption in the People's Republic of China
- List of crime bosses convicted in the 21st century
