= Wang Hongju =

Chinese politician

- 王鸿举

Mayor of Chongqing
- In office October 2002 – November 2009
- Party Secretary: Huang Zhendong; Wang Yang; Bo Xilai
- Preceded by: Bao Xuding
- Succeeded by: Huang Qifan

Personal details
- Born: October 1945 (age 80–81) Chongqing
- Party: Chinese Communist Party
- Education: Sichuan University

Wang Hongju (Chinese: 王鸿举; born October 1945) is a retired Chinese politician. He was the mayor of Chongqing, one of four direct-controlled municipalities in China, from 2003 to 2009. He served under Bo Xilai, who headed the Communist Party organization of the city.

== Biography ==
Born in Chongqing, Wang graduated from Sichuan University in 1968, majoring in mathematics. He joined the Chinese Communist Party (CCP) in February 1979. During his early years, he served in various posts in Pengshui County and Fuling of Sichuan. He studied at the CCP Central Party School from February to July 1987. In September 1996, he became a standing committee member of the CCP Chongqing committee, and the secretary of the CCP Fuling committee and chairman of the Fuling CPPCC. In June 1997, he was appointed the vice secretary of the CCP Chongqing committee and vice mayor of the city. In October 2002, he was elevated to the post of acting mayor of Chongqing. He was confirmed as mayor in January 2003, while also holding the position of vice Party chief of the city.

Wang was reconfirmed for another term as mayor in January 2008 but resigned on 30 November 2009, a resignation believed to be linked with the Chongqing gang trials carried out by Bo Xilai. It was said that Wang's years of work in Chongqing and his being "native" to the city may have put him in an uneasy situation where he would be forced to cooperate in investigations into his associates or subordinates (Bo Xilai was not from Chongqing originally). Wang was replaced by Huang Qifan. It was said that Wang himself tendered his resignation due to age. At 64, he was only one year away from the mandated retirement age for provincial-level officials.

After resigning as mayor, Wang was named a deputy chair of the National People's Congress Environment Protection and Resources Conservation Committee. He served on the committee until 2013.

Wang was a member of the 16th and 17th Central Committees of the Chinese Communist Party.

== See also ==
- Politics of Chongqing
