= Huang Qifan =

Chinese politician (born 1952)

- 黄奇帆
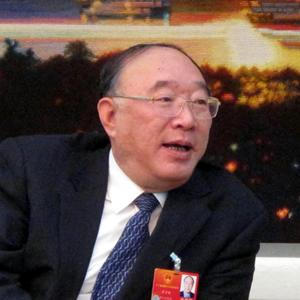
- Huang Qifan in 2012

Mayor of Chongqing
- In office 30 November 2009 – 30 December 2016
- Party Secretary: Bo Xilai; Zhang Dejiang; Sun Zhengcai
- Preceded by: Wang Hongju
- Succeeded by: Zhang Guoqing

Personal details
- Born: May 1952 (age 74) Zhuji, Zhejiang
- Party: Chinese Communist Party (1976-)
- Children: Huang Ranfei (son)
- Education: Shanghai Mechanical College; Nankai University; China Europe International Business School

Huang Qifan (simplified Chinese: 黄奇帆; traditional Chinese: 黃奇帆; pinyin: Huáng Qífān, born May 1952) is a Chinese politician, best known for serving as mayor of Chongqing, one of China's four direct-administered municipalities, from 2009 to 2016. Huang began his career in Shanghai as an economic technocrat, helping to develop Pudong New Area in the 1990s, before being transferred to Chongqing as a deputy mayor in 2001. He earned a reputation as a political "tumbler" for surviving the downfalls of two Chongqing party chiefs, Bo Xilai and Sun Zhengcai. In 2026, a decade after his retirement, Huang was placed under investigation for corruption by the Central Commission for Discipline Inspection.

== Career ==
Huang was born in Zhuji, Zhejiang province. During the Cultural Revolution he worked in a coking factory. He joined the Chinese Communist Party in 1976. His political career began in Shanghai's Pudong New Area in 1993. Between 1994 and 1995 Huang served as the director of the Policy Research Office of the Communist Party organization in Shanghai. Between 1995 and 2001 Huang served as the deputy secretary-general of the Shanghai municipal government. Between 1998 and 1999 Huang took on a one-year stint pursuing his Executive MBA at the China Europe International Business School (CEIBS) in Shanghai.

Huang was transferred to work in Chongqing in 2001, several years after the city was elevated to "direct-controlled municipality" status equivalent to that of Shanghai. He was the city's deputy mayor from 2001 to 2009 and sat on the Communist Party's Chongqing Standing Committee. Huang is unique in that he has served under four Chongqing party secretaries He Guoqiang, Wang Yang, Bo Xilai, and Zhang Dejiang, each with their unique set of policies and political beliefs, and all of whom went on to become prominent politicians at the national level. Huang is therefore considered a political "tumbler" or "survivor", and has been dubbed the sichao yuanlao (四朝元老; roughly, "he who served four emperors.").

Huang was considered a key political ally of Bo Xilai, who abruptly fell out of favour with the national leadership following the Wang Lijun incident in February 2012. Many believe that Huang's political career had come to an end due to his association with Bo and the appointment of Zhang Dejiang as party secretary for Chongqing following Bo's dismissal in March 2012. During a televised government meeting, Huang expressed his support for Zhang. He was elected to the 18th Central Committee of the Chinese Communist Party in 2012, and re-elected Mayor of Chongqing in January 2013.

Huang left his post as mayor of Chongqing on 29 December 2016; he then became vice-chair of the National People's Congress Financial and Economic Affairs Committee. He is also an adviser to the China Finance 40 Forum (CF40).

In 2018, Huang stated his opposition to the hukou system, which he believes is unnecessarily reducing the competitiveness of older Chinese workers.

On 13 October 2026, Huang was suspected of "serious violations of laws and regulations" by the Central Commission for Discipline Inspection (CCDI), the party's internal disciplinary body, and the National Supervisory Commission, the highest anti-corruption agency of China.

== Family ==
Huang's wife worked in computing. The couple have one son, Huang Ranfei, who studied finance at Fudan University and Carnegie Mellon University. He subsequently worked for Lehman Brothers, Nomura, and Morgan Stanley. Amid controversy over the "Sons and Daughters" program, under which investment banks hired Chinese princelings for their family connections, he left Morgan Stanley in 2015 and became an executive director of a Hong Kong company. In 2021, he joined Shandong Weiqiao Pioneering Group to oversee its operations in the Greater Bay Area. In October 2026, Huang Ranfei and his father were taken from their home together by authorities.
