= Elective =

Elective may refer to:

- Choice, the mental process of judging the merits of multiple options and selecting one of them
- Elective course in education
  - Elective (medical), a period of study forming part of a medical degree
- In medical procedures, planned interventions, as opposed to emergency care
  - Elective surgery
- An adjective for election
  - Elective monarchy, a monarchy ruled by an elected monarch, in contrast to a hereditary monarchy
