= Tian Xiangli =

Chinese politician

- 田向利

Chairwoman of the Sichuan Provincial Committee of the Chinese People's Political Consultative Conference
- Incumbent
- Assumed office January 2022
- Preceded by: Ke Zunping

Personal details
- Born: March 1963 (age 63) Xingtai, Hebei, China
- Party: Chinese Communist Party
- Education: Hebei North University; Jilin University

Tian Xiangli (Chinese: 田向利; pinyin: Tián Xiànglì; born March 1963) is a Chinese politician and the current Chinese Communist Party Committee Secretary of the Sichuan Provincial Committee of the Chinese People's Political Consultative Conference, in office since December 2021. She has background in the Communist Youth League. Previously, she was the head of the United Front Work Department of Sichuan, and a member of its provincial party standing committee, and before that, Communist Party Secretary of Qinhuangdao, a city in Hebei, and the head of the Publicity Department of Hebei province.

== Early life and education ==
Tian was born in 1963 in Xingtai, Hebei. She graduated with a degree in Chinese at Hebei Teacher's College (later merged into Hebei North University), graduating in 1984.

== Career in Hebei ==
She then joined the Chinese Communist Party. She took on local administrative positions in the provincial capital Shijiazhuang before becoming involved with the Communist Youth League organization in the province, serving successively as the Youth League leader in Shijiazhuang, then Hebei province.

In 2003 Tian took on her first major political role as Chinese Communist Party Deputy Committee Secretary of Tangshan (full department-level rank); she then obtained a graduate degree in management from Tianjin University. In 2005 she was named executive deputy head of the provincial United Front department, then became provincial director of human resources.

In 2008 she was made a vice-chair of the provincial People's Political Consultative Conference. In January 2011 she joined the elite ranks of the provincial Party Standing Committee as provincial United Front chief, then in February 2013 was named party chief of Qinhuangdao. In March 2011 she was selected as the chief supervisor of the elections of the top officers of the Chinese People's Political Consultative Conference. In September 2015, she was named head of the Publicity Department of Hebei province.

== Career in Sichuan ==
In December 2017, in her first transfer outside of her home province, she was named head of the United Front Work Department of Sichuan. In February 2018, she concurrently served as chairwoman of Sichuan Federation of Trade Unions. On 31 December 2021, she was appointed party branch secretary of the Sichuan Provincial Committee of the Chinese People's Political Consultative Conference, the province's top political advisory body.

Civic offices
Preceded by Li Shi	Secretary of Hebei Provincial Committee of the Communist Youth League; 2001–2003	Succeeded by Gao Hongzhi
Government offices
Preceded by Song Taiping	Head of Hebei Provincial Personnel Services Department; 2007–2008	Succeeded by Chen Gui
Party political offices
Preceded by Liu Yongrui	Head of the United Front Department of Hebei Provincial Committee of the Chinese Communist Party; 2011–2013	Succeeded by Fan Zhaobing
Preceded by Wang Santang	Communist Party Secretary of Qinhuangdao; 2013 – 2015	Succeeded by Meng Xiangwei
Previous: Ai Wenli	Head of the Publicity Department of Hebei Provincial Committee of the Chinese Communist Party; 2015 – 2017	Next: Jiao Yanlong
Preceded by Li Jing	Head of the United Front Department of Sichuan Provincial Committee of the Chinese Communist Party; 2017–2021	Succeeded by Zhao Junmin
Assembly seats
Preceded by Ke Zunping	Chairwoman of the Sichuan Provincial Committee of the Chinese People's Political Consultative Conference; 2022–present	Incumbent
