= 弘志 =

弘志, meaning 'wide, intention', may refer to:

- Hiroshi, a masculine Japanese given name
- Hongzhi, a masculine Chinese given name
