= Academic grading in Kenya =

Academic grading in Kenya is the grading system of Kenya.

== Secondary school ==
In Kenya, the grading system varies according to the overall performance of candidates in the national exam called Kenya Certificate of Secondary Education (KCSE).

All grade thresholds change per year according to the intensity of the exam. As of 2019, Exghest Mean Grade (A) equated to a percentage of 81+, although below is the Standard Grading System that is implemented as a base for all series of examinations.

Percent	Grade	0–13%	E	1

Examinees are awarded an overall grade for the subjects examined. Students sit for 7, 8, or 9 subjects, but the overall grade and points are calculated from 7 subjects, as follows:

- Three courses from Group 1: 101 English, 102 Kiswahili and 121 Mathematics are required
- Two courses from Group 2: Biology, Physics, and Chemistry
- One course from Group 3: History and Government, Geography, CRE/IRE/HRE
- An additional course not among those mentioned above

== Undergraduate Degree ==
Undergraduate degree grading system in Kenya is summarized by the table below:

Grade	Scale (%)	Description
A	70.0 - 100.0	First Class Honours
B	60.0 - 69.0	Second Class Honours (Upper Division )
C	50.0 - 59.0	Second Class Honours (Lower Division )
D	40.0 - 49.0	Pass
E	0.0 - 39.0	Fail
