= Course (education) =

Program of study, or unit of teaching that typically lasts one education term

In higher education, a course is a unit of teaching that typically lasts one academic term, is led by one or more instructors (teachers or professors), and has a fixed roster of students. A course usually covers an individual subject. Courses generally have a fixed program of sessions every week during the term, called lessons or classes. Students may receive a grade and academic credit after completion of the course. Courses can either be compulsory material or "elective". An elective is usually not a required course, but there are a certain number of non-specific electives that are required for certain majors. The entire collection of courses required to complete an academic degree is called a program (or programme) of studies.

The term is used in various countries, such as Vietnam, Canada, Nigeria, and the United States. In India, the United Kingdom, Australia and Singapore, as well as parts of Canada, the word "unit" or "module" would be used to refer to an academic course as used in North America and the rest of Europe. In the Philippines, a course can be an individual subject (usually referred to by faculty and school officials) or the entire programme (usually referred to by students and outsiders).

== Types of courses ==
Courses are made up of individual sessions, typically on a fixed weekly schedule.

There are different formats of courses in universities:

- Lecture courses, where the instructor gives lectures with minimal interaction;
- Seminars, where students prepare and present their original written work for discussion and critique;
- Colloquium or reading courses, where the instructor assigns readings for each session, which are then discussed by the students;
- Tutorial courses, where one or a small number of students work on a topic and meet with the instructor weekly for discussion and guidance;
- Independent study courses, where a student requests to create and title an area of study for themselves, which is more concentrated and in-depth than a standard course. It is directed under a tenured faculty member and approved by a department chair or possibly the dean within that specific college;
- Laboratory courses, where most work takes place in a laboratory. Usually, such courses have a lecture section as well as the laboratory section of the same course;
- Survey courses lightly cover a broad area of knowledge.

Many courses combine these formats. Lecture courses often include weekly discussion sections with smaller groups of students led by the principal instructor, another instructor, or a teaching assistant. Laboratory courses often combine lectures, discussion sections, and laboratory sessions.

Students are expected to do various kinds of work for a course:

- Attending course sessions.
- Reading and studying course readings assigned in the course syllabus.
- Discussing material they have read.
- Writing short and long papers based on assigned reading and their own library research.
- Completing homework or problem sets.
- Completing laboratory exercises.
- Taking quizzes and examinations.

The exact work required depends on the discipline, the course, and the particular instructor. Unlike most European university courses, grades are generally determined by all of these types of work, not only the final examination.

== Elective and required courses ==
An elective course is one chosen by a student from a number of optional subjects or courses in a curriculum, as opposed to a required course which the student must take. While required courses (sometimes called "core courses" or "general education courses") are deemed essential for an academic degree, elective courses tend to be more specialized. Elective courses usually have fewer students than the required courses.

The term elective is also used for a period of medical study conducted away from the student's home medical school, often abroad. Motivations for choosing such a program include a wish to experience other cultures and to learn how to work in the clinical situations in other countries.

Elective courses are also offered in the third and fourth years of university, though the choice is more restrictive and will depend upon the particular major the student has chosen. For example, at the University of British Columbia, students intending to specialize in Sanskrit as part of a major in Asian language and culture will usually have to complete several Sanskrit and Hindustani or Punjabi courses during the first two years of university, as well as additional courses in other languages of India in the third and fourth years of study. In addition to these required courses, however, students would choose among several third- and fourth-year elective courses on topics not directly related to India, such as the history and culture of China, Japan or Indonesia.

== US course numbering system ==
In the United States, most colleges and universities use a course numbering system where each course is identified by the name of the major (or an abbreviation thereof) followed by a 3- or 4-digit number − for example, "French 213" (pronounced "two thirteen") or "CS 123" (pronounced "one twenty-three"). This common numbering system began to be used in the 1920s and was designed to make transfer between colleges easier. In theory, any numbered course in one academic institution should bring a student to the same standard as a similarly numbered course at other institutions. However, this is not a strict rule, and each institution is free to choose its own course numbers. Other countries may use very different numbering schemes or even no numbering system at all. In general, the equivalence between courses at different universities must be established by comparing their stated contents.

The first digit of the course number usually designates the level, or relative difficulty, of the course, and may roughly correspond to the year of study in which the course is likely to be taken (e. g. 1 for freshman, 2 for sophomore, 3 for junior, 4 for senior in undergraduate courses, and 5 and above for graduate courses). Correspondingly, "a 200-level course" (pronounced "two hundred") would mean a sophomore-level course.

The attribution of digits other than the first is even less standardized, but in general, sequences of related courses tend to have consecutive numbers, indicating prerequisites or a recommended sequence. For instance, a college may not allow students to enroll in English 201 before they have passed English 101 and 102. It is common for the middle digit(s) to indicate the subfield within the department in which the course is offered − for example, in a Physics department, all courses numbered "PHYS 47xx" may be about magnetism, while all "PHYS 48xx" courses may be about optics.

The course number 101 (pronounced "one oh one") is often used for a first or introductory course in a particular topic. This number appears to have been first used by the University of Buffalo in 1929. It eventually gave the US slang term "101" used to designate elementary knowledge in any subject, academic or not; as in "boiling potatoes is cooking 101". There is a record of usage in this generic sense in 1986.

Sometimes the same course is taught by different faculty and/or at different times. In this case, a section number is used to differentiate between the different classes.

== See also ==
- Course allocation
- Course credit
