= Song Taiping =

Chinese politician

- 宋太平

Vice Chairman of the Standing Committee of the Hebei People's Congress
- In office January 2012 – January 2018
- Chairman: Zhang Qingli; Zhou Benshun; Zhao Kezhi; Wang Dongfeng

Communist Party Secretary of Baoding
- In office January 2008 – January 2012
- Preceded by: Song Changrui
- Succeeded by: Xu Ning

Communist Party Secretary of Zhangjiakou
- In office November 2006 – January 2008
- Preceded by: Liu Yongrui
- Succeeded by: Xu Ning

Personal details
- Born: December 1955 (age 70) Baixiang County, Hebei, China
- Party: Chinese Communist Party (1979–2022; expelled)
- Education: Central Party School of the Chinese Communist Party

Song Taiping (Chinese: 宋太平; pinyin: Sòng Tàipíng; born December 1955) is a retired Chinese politician who spent his entire career in his home-province Hebei. He was investigated by China's top anti-graft agency in July 2021. Previously he served as vice chairman of the Standing Committee of the Hebei People's Congress.

== Career ==
Song was born in Baixiang County, Hebei, in December 1955. He joined the Baixiang County Fertilizer Plant in March 1975, a year and a half later, he was transferred to the Publicity Department of CCP Baixiang County Committee and then to the CCP Baixiang County Committee Office in April 1979. He joined the Chinese Communist Party in July 1979. In September 1984, he moved to the CCP Xingtai Committee Office, where he served as deputy director in April 1988. In December 1992, he was appointed magistrate of Ren County, a position he held for five years. He was deputy director of the Organization Department of the CCP Hebei Provincial Committee in December 1997, and held that office until January 2003. Then he served as head of Hebei Provincial Office of Personnel Services before serving as party chief of Zhangjiakou in November 2006. He became party chief of Baoding in January 2008, and served until January 2012, when he was promoted to become vice chairman of the Standing Committee of the Hebei People's Congress. He served in the post until his retirement in January 2018.

== Downfall ==
On 25 July 2021, he has been put under investigation for alleged "serious violations of discipline and laws" by the Central Commission for Discipline Inspection (CCDI), the party's internal disciplinary body, and the National Supervisory Commission, the highest anti-corruption agency of China.

He was expelled from the CCP on 10 January 2022. He was taken away by the Supreme People's Procuratorate on January 25.

On 26 February 2024, the Intermediate People's Court of Yuncheng sentenced him to 14 years in prison for bribery. He was also fined 5 million yuan (around 703,000 U.S. dollars) and had his illegal gains from bribery recovered and turned over to the state treasury.

Government offices
Preceded by Zhao Luxiang (赵禄祥)	Head of Hebei Provincial Office of Personnel Services; 2003–2006	Succeeded by Tian Xiangli
Party political offices
Preceded by Liu Yongrui	Communist Party Secretary of Zhangjiakou; 2006–2008	Succeeded by Xu Ning
Preceded by Song Changrui	Communist Party Secretary of Baoding; 2008–2012	Succeeded by Xu Ning
