= Gao Hongzhi =

Chinese politician

- 高宏志
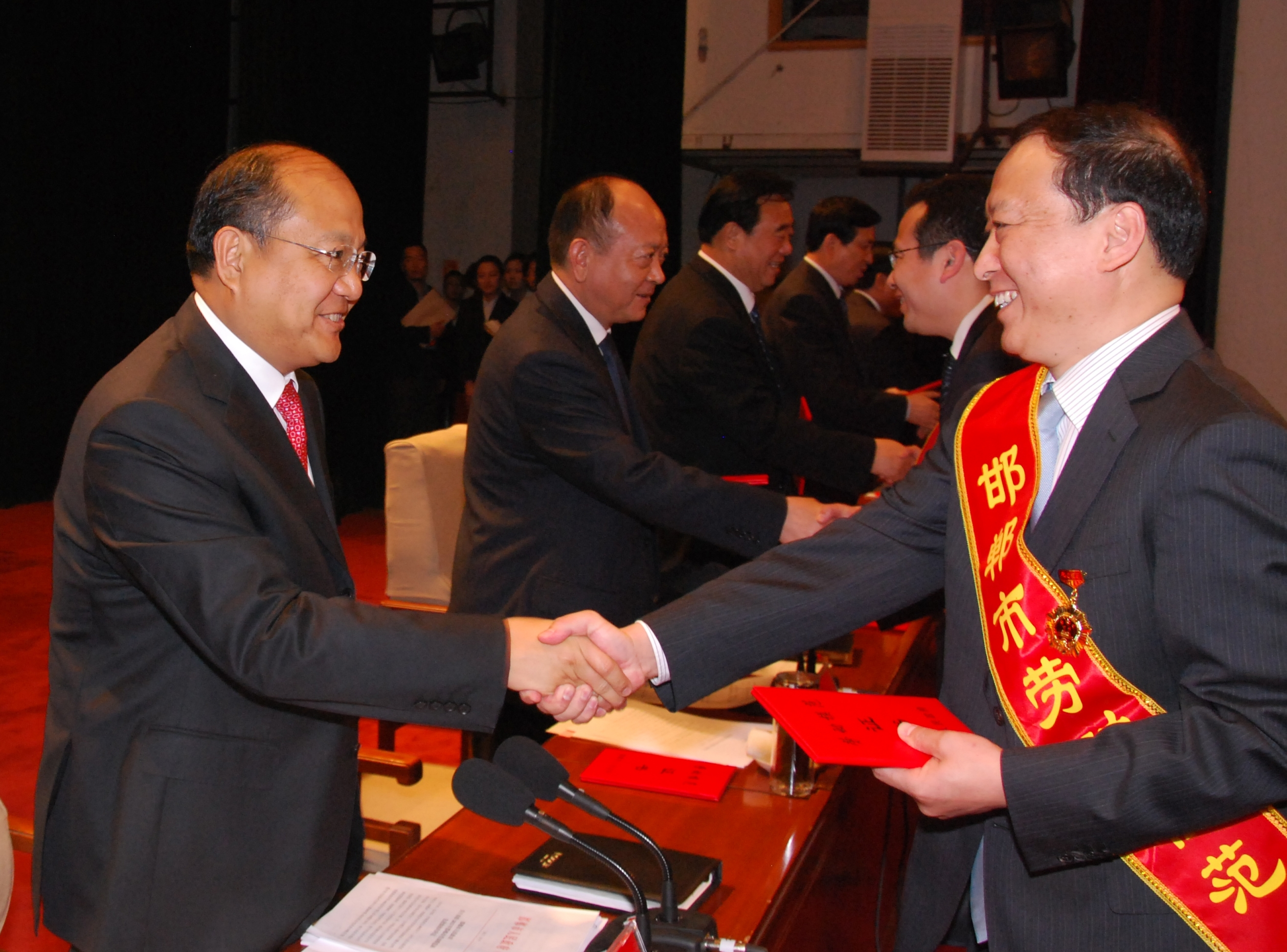
- Gao (left) in April 2013

Communist Party Secretary of Handan
- In office February 2013 – September 2020
- Preceded by: Guo Dajian
- Succeeded by: Zhang Weigao

Mayor of Handan
- In office January 2012 – February 2013
- Preceded by: Zheng Xuebi
- Succeeded by: Hui Jian

Mayor of Hengshui
- In office December 2006 – January 2012
- Preceded by: Ji Chuntang
- Succeeded by: Yang Hui

Personal details
- Born: October 1967 (age 58–59) Zhengding County, Hebei, China
- Party: Chinese Communist Party
- Education: Zhengding Normal School; Hebei Normal University; Beijing Normal University; Hebei University

Gao Hongzhi (Chinese: 高宏志; pinyin: Gāo Hóngzhì; born October 1967) is a former Chinese politician who spent his entire career in north China's Hebei province. As of September 2020, he was under investigation by China's top anti-corruption agency. Previously he served as mayor and party secretary of Handan and before that, mayor of Hengshui. He is a representative of the 19th National Congress of the Chinese Communist Party.

== Biography ==
Gao was born in Zhengding County, Hebei, in October 1967. After graduating from Zhengding Normal School in 1986, he stayed at the university and worked in the Communist Youth League, where he eventually became its secretary in April 1991. He joined the Chinese Communist Party (CCP) in December 1990. He served as an official at the Hebei Provincial School of the Communist Youth League brief 1992–1995 tenure before being assigned to the Organization Department of Hebei Provincial Committee of the Communist Youth League. He was eventually promoted to secretary in April 2003.

In November 2006, he was promoted to be deputy party secretary of Hengshui, and named acting mayor of the city. He was installed as mayor in March 2007. His first foray into a regional leadership role. His predecessor Ji Chuntang was removed from public office for the 2008 Chinese milk scandal.

He became mayor of Handan, in January 2012, and then party secretary, the top political position in the city, beginning in February 2013.

=== Downfall ===
On 2 September 2020, he was put under investigation for alleged "serious violations of discipline and laws" by the Central Commission for Discipline Inspection (CCDI), the party's internal disciplinary body, and the National Supervisory Commission, the highest anti-corruption agency of China. His predecessor Zheng Xuebi was placed under investigation for the suspicion of "serious violations of discipline" in October 2015 and sentenced to 17 years in December 2019. He was dismissed from public office on September 11.

Government offices
| Preceded by Ji Chuntang | Mayor of Hengshui; 2006–2012 | Succeeded by Yang Hui |
| Preceded by Zheng Xuebi | Mayor of Handan; 2012–2013 | Succeeded by Hui Jian |
Party political offices
| Preceded by Tian Xiangli | Secretary of Hebei Provincial Committee of the Communist Youth League of China; 2001–2003 | Succeeded by Wang Xiaodong |
| Preceded by Guo Dajian | Communist Party Secretary of Handan; 2013–2020 | Succeeded by Zhang Weigao |
