= Hongzhi =

Hongzhi may refer to:

- Hongzhi Emperor, the tenth emperor of the Chinese Ming dynasty
- Hongzhi Zhengjue (1091-1157), Chinese Chan Buddhist monk
- Chen Hongzhi (陳弘志; died 835), the eunuch of Emperor Xianzong of Tang
- Fu Hongzhi, Chinese paralympic archer
- Gao Hongzhi (born 1967), Chinese politician
- Li Hongzhi (born c. 1952, Chinese religious leader
- Liang Hongzhi (1882–1946), Chinese politician
- Sun Hongzhi (born 1965), Chinese politician
- Xu Hongzhi (born 1996), Chinese short track speed skater
- Wan Hongzhi (萬弘志), fictional character portrayed by Nicholas Teo in Taiwanese television series AQUARIUS
