= Meng Xiangwei =

Communist Party Secretary of Qinhuangdao, Hebei, China

Meng Xiangwei (Chinese: 孟祥伟; born June 1966) is the Communist Party Secretary of Qinhuangdao, Hebei, China. Meng was born in Zhao County, Hebei. He earned a degree in journalism from Lanzhou University. After graduating, he worked for the North Economic Daily newspaper. He then worked as a political staffer to Hebei party chiefs Cheng Weigao and Ye Liansong, before moving to the Baoding area to take on a series of local leadership roles. In 2013, he became party chief of Xingtai. In 2015, he was named party chief of Qinhuangdao.

Preceded by Tian Xiangli	Communist Party Secretary of Qinhuangdao; 2015 –	Incumbent
