= Zheng Xuebi =

Chinese politician

- 郑雪碧

Communist Party Secretary of Chengde
- In office January 2012 – October 2015
- Preceded by: Yang Rui (杨汭)
- Succeeded by: Zhou Zhongming (周仲明)

Mayor of Handan
- In office March 2011 – January 2012
- Preceded by: Guo Dajian (郭大建)
- Succeeded by: Gao Zhihong (高宏志)

Mayor of Zhangjiakou
- In office September 2006 – January 2011
- Preceded by: Gao Jinhao (高金浩)
- Succeeded by: Wang Xiaodong (王晓东)

Personal details
- Born: February 1958 (age 68) Gaocheng County, Hebei, China
- Party: Chinese Communist Party (1978–2016; expelled)
- Education: Central Party School of the Chinese Communist Party; China Youth University of Political Studies; Tianjin University of Finance & Economics

Zheng Xuebi (simplified Chinese: 郑雪碧; traditional Chinese: 鄭雪碧; pinyin: Zhèng Xuěbì; born February 1958) is a former Chinese politician who spent most of his career in north China's Hebei province. He has been placed under investigation as Communist Party General Secretary Xi Jinping's continues a campaign against corruption at all levels of government. Previously he served as Communist Party Secretary of Chengde, the top political position in the city.

He is a delegate to the 18th National Congress of the Chinese Communist Party and 11th National People's Congress. He is also a member of the 7th and 8th Hebei Provincial Committee of the Chinese Communist Party.

== Life and career ==
Zheng Xuebi was born in Gaocheng County, Hebei in February 1958. He began his political career in October 1974, and joined the Chinese Communist Party in April 1978. In April 1982 he became the deputy secretary of Gaocheng County branch of the Communist Youth League, rising to secretary in July 1984.

In September 1985 he was accepted to China Youth University of Political Studies and graduated in July 1987.

He served as deputy secretary of Shijiazhuang division of the Communist Youth League in July 1987, and three years later promoted to the secretary position.

In May 1995 he served as deputy communist party secretary and county governor of Lingshou County, and held that office until January 1998.

In January 1998 he was promoted to become the communist party secretary of Luancheng County, a position he held until July 2001.

In September 2006 he was promoted again to become deputy communist party secretary and mayor of Zhangjiakou, he remained in that position until January 2011, when he was transferred to Handan, the fourth largest city in Hebei province, and appointed deputy communist party secretary and mayor.

In January 2012, he rose to become Communist Party Secretary of Chengde, home of the Mountain Resort, which is known as "back yard garden of Beijing".

== Downfall ==
On October 14, 2015, he was placed under investigation for the suspicion of "serious violations of discipline", said one-sentence statement issued by the ruling Communist Party's corruption watchdog body, the Central Commission for Discipline Inspection (CCDI).

Zheng was expelled from the Communist Party on April 7, 2016. On September 29, he was sentenced to 17 years and fined 1.8 million yuan for taking bribes and holding a huge amount of property with unidentified sources.

Government offices
Preceded by Gao Jinhao (高金浩)	Mayor of Zhangjiakou; 2006–2011	Succeeded by Wang Xiaodong (王晓东)
Preceded by Guo Dajian (郭大建)	Mayor of Handan; 2011–2012	Succeeded by Gao Hongzhi (高宏志)
Party political offices
Preceded by Yang Rui (杨汭)	Communist Party Secretary of Chengde; 2012–2015	Succeeded by Zhou Zhongming (周仲明)
