= Directed individual study =

Directed individual study (DIS) is a college, university or college preparatory school level class providing a more in-depth and comprehensive study of a specific topic than is available in the classroom.

Courses may be taken as electives. In some cases, a directed individual study may be:

- A professor-student rendition of a course that will not be offered again before a student graduates
- The college or university department does not have an established course on the subject area
- The student wishes to research an available course in more depth
- A course offered at another college or university that is not a part of the general curriculum
- Courses that may be applied to satisfy the requirements for a Master's degree.

== Process ==
Eligible students are above a certain GPA (though different universities may set different thresholds for this), and (depending on the department or major) may need to complete certain standard courses as prerequisites.

A student identifies an area in which he or she wishes to undertake research and approaches a faculty member with expertise in that field to request a directed individual study.

The student and instructor complete a DIS form and submit it to the academic coordinator who establishes the course in the registration system. The student often titles his/her own subject area.

The content and requirements of the course are worked out between each instructor and student. Generally, students should not expect a faculty member to agree to a directed individual study unless they have had the student in a regular class and are familiar with that student. The faculty member develops a related syllabus, for review and approval by the department chair and in some cases the dean of the college.

== Sources ==
- University of Missouri-Kansas City, Doctor of Pharmacy
- Washington and Lee University, Department of Accounting
- University of Alabama, Department of Consumer Sciences
- Florida State University, Department of Political Science
- Denison University Registrar's Office. Requirements for Directed/Independent Study
- University of North Carolina-Wilmington, Communications
- Cranbrook Kingswood Upper School Curriculum Guide. (See page 4 for directed study information.)
