= Qinhuangdao =

Qinhuangdao 秦皇岛市
- Prefecture-level city
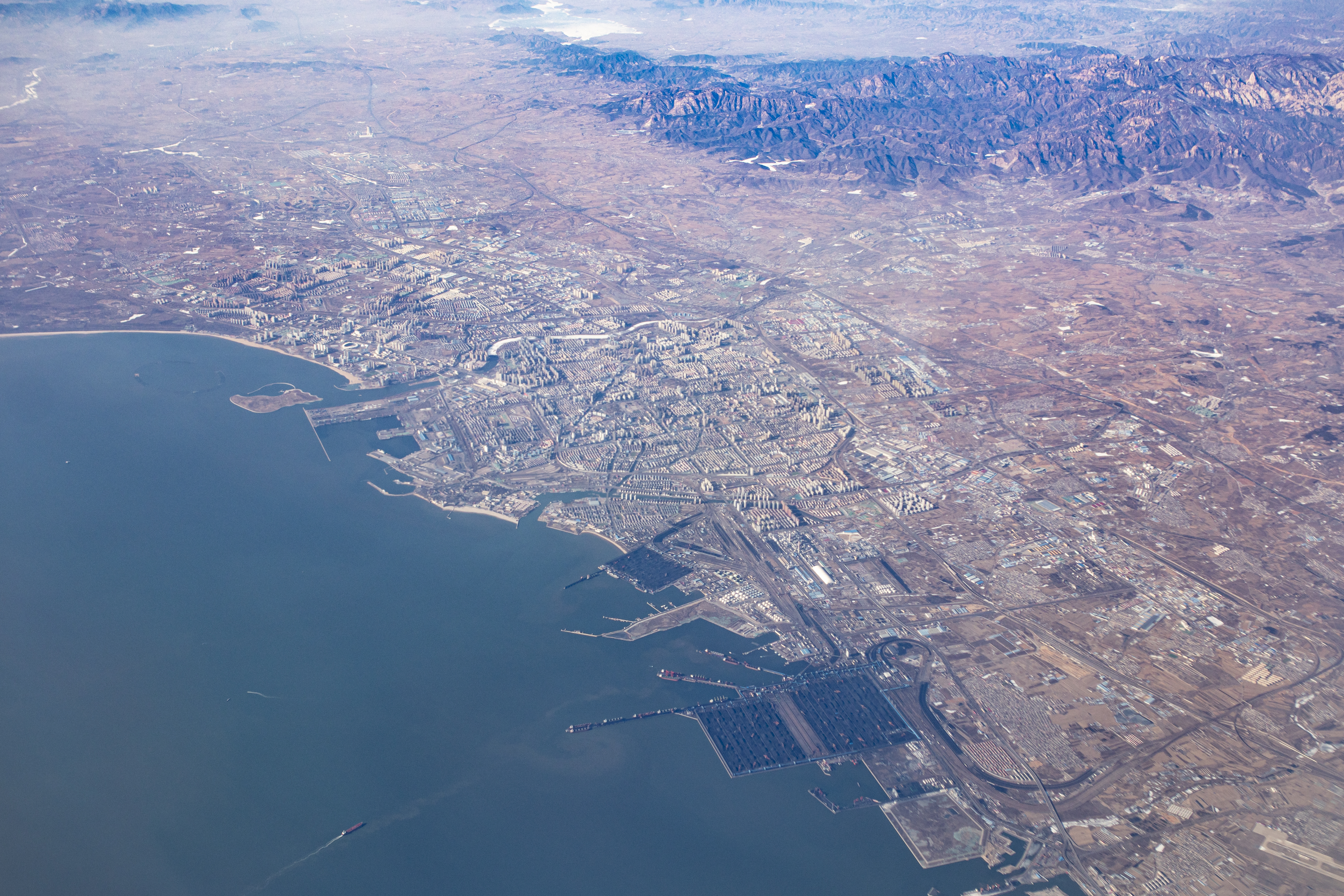
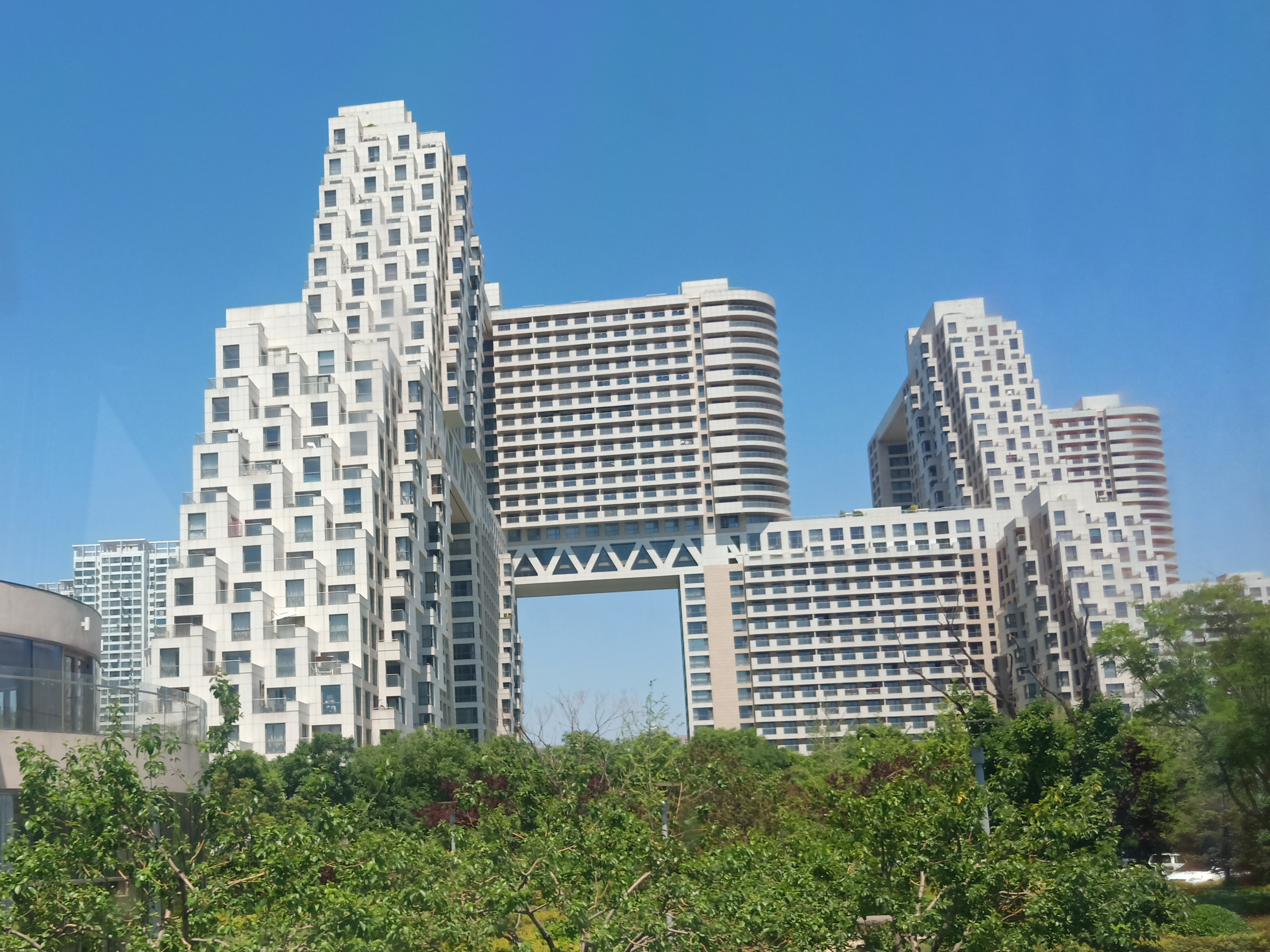
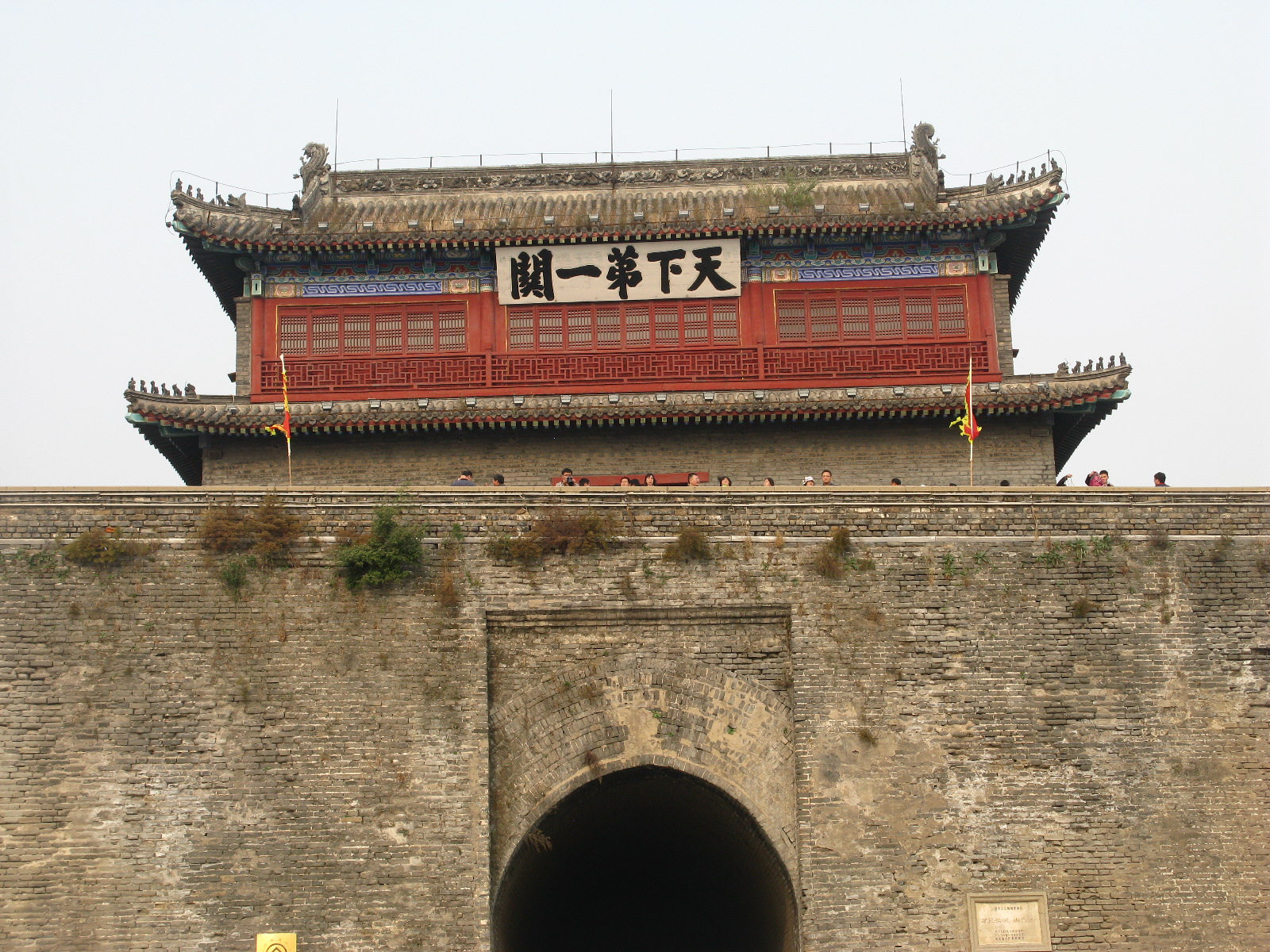
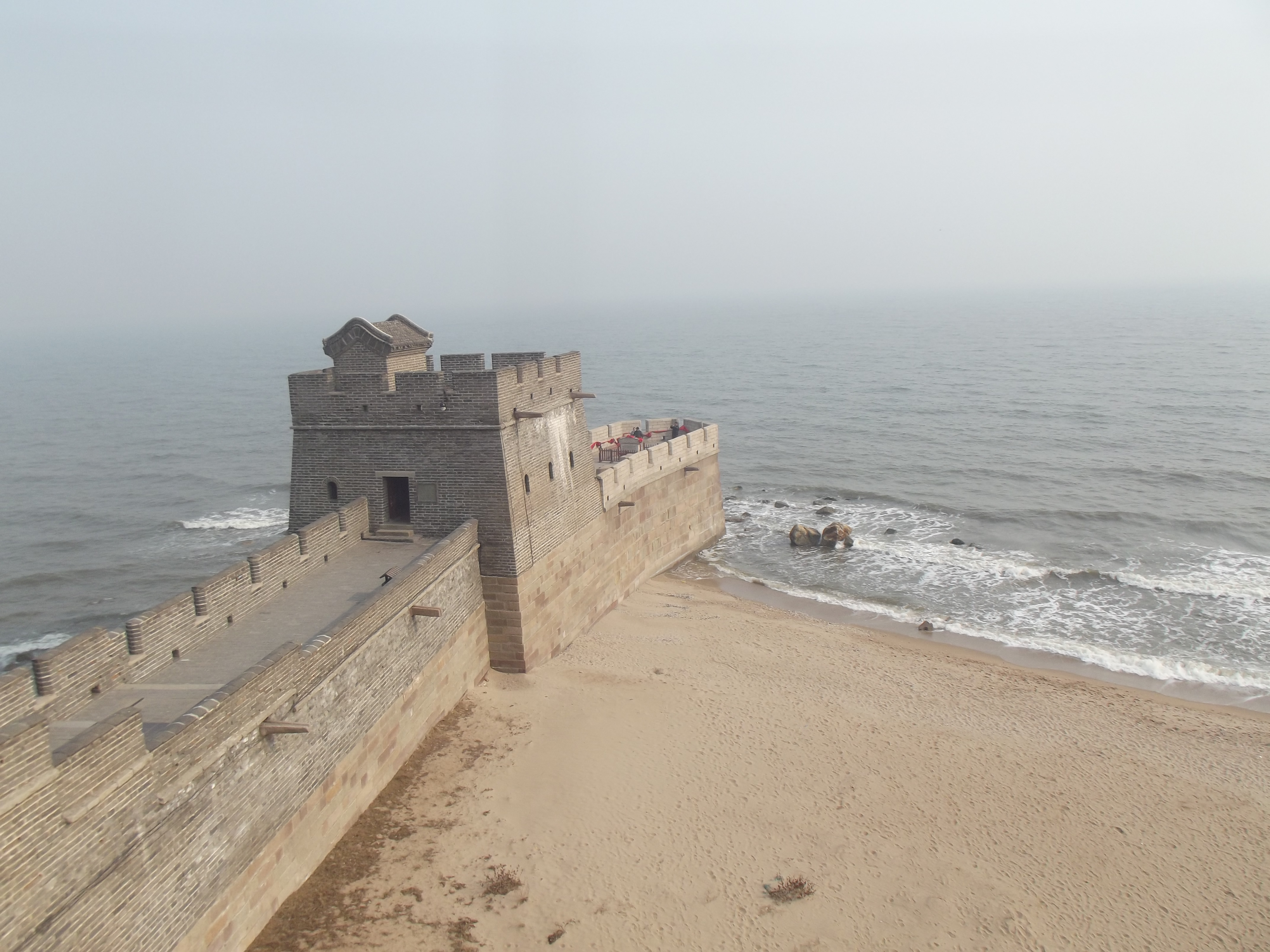
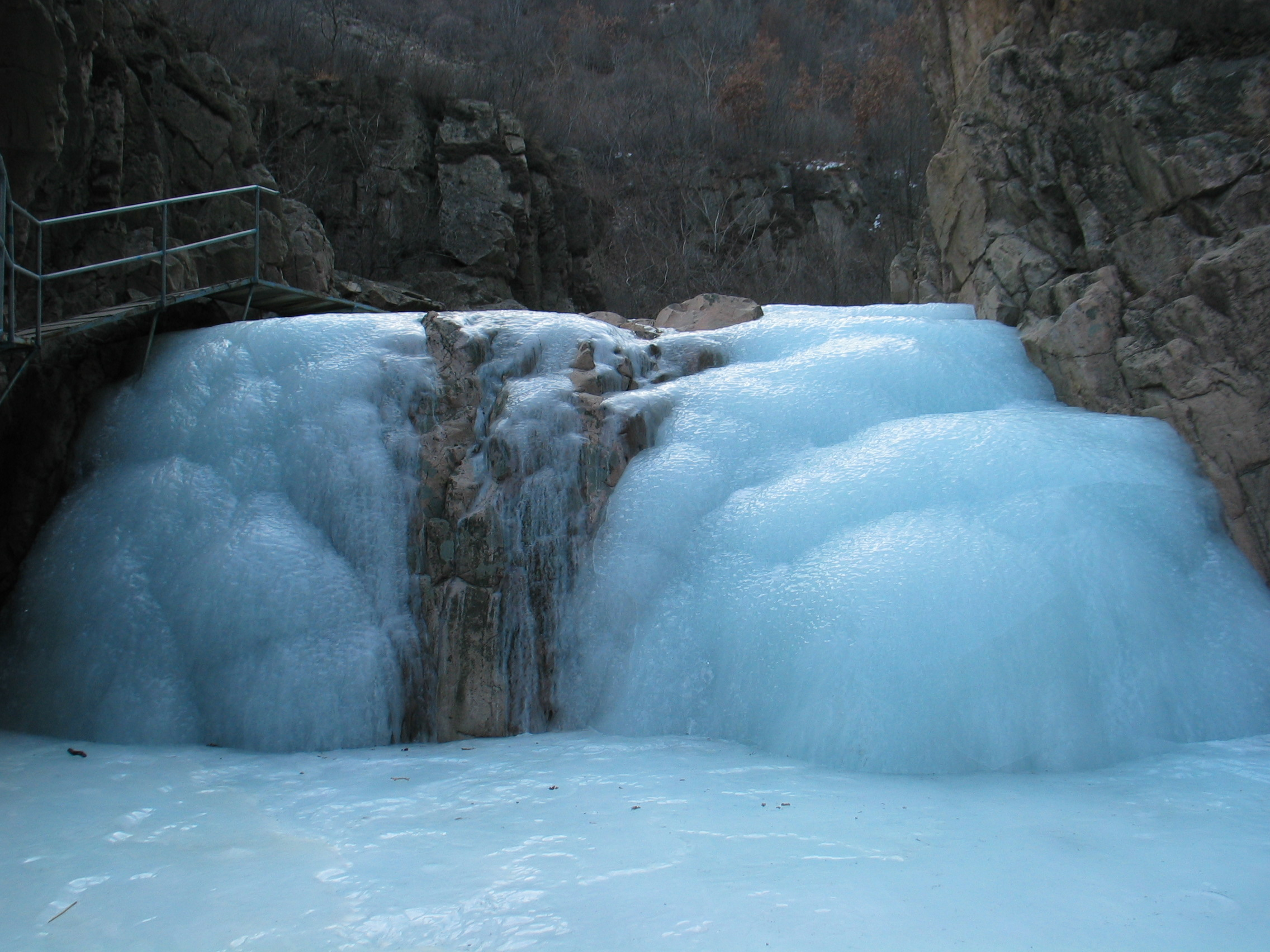
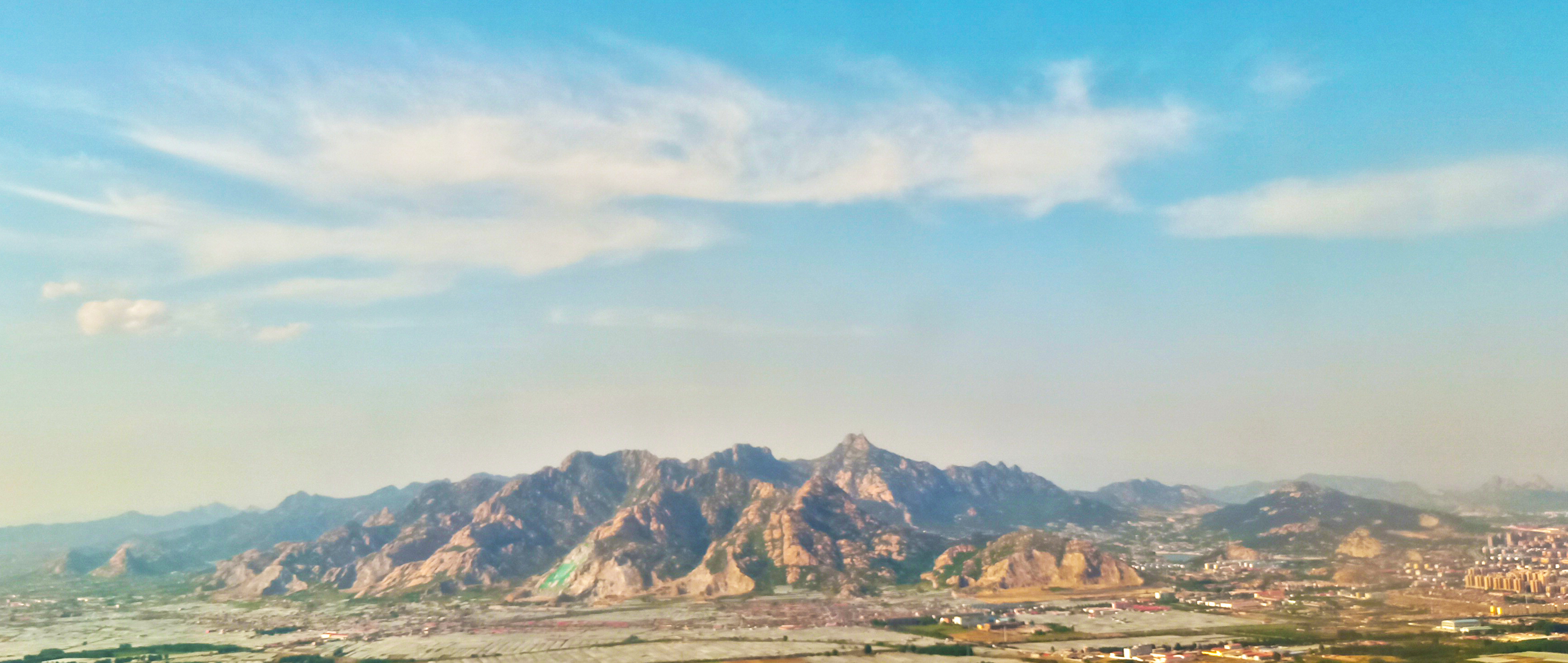
- Clockwise from the top: Aerial view of the city, Shanhai Pass, Longtan Falls, Yan Mountains, Old Dragon Head, Habitat Apartments

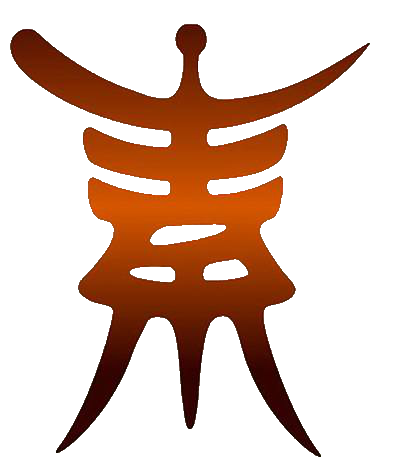
- Seal

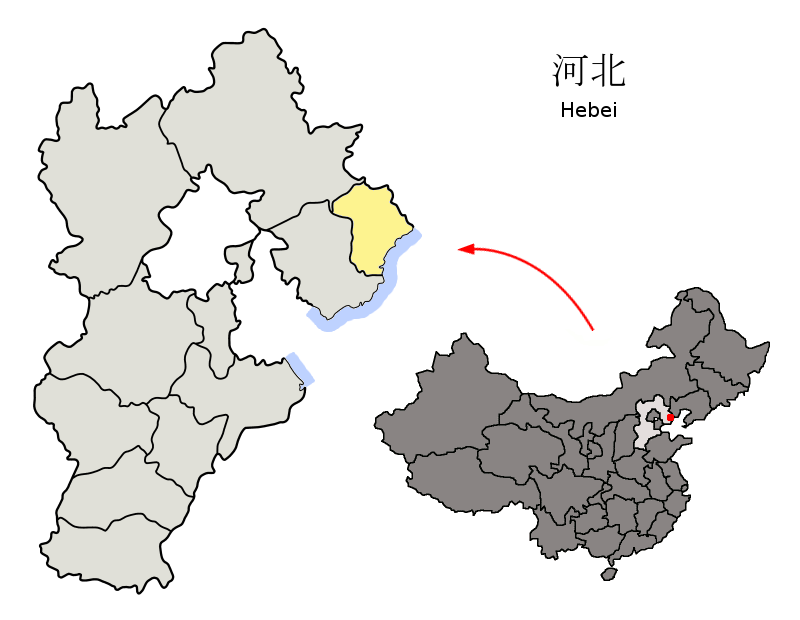
- Location of Qinhuangdao City jurisdiction in Hebei

- Location of the city centre in Hebei Qinhuangdao (Northern China) Qinhuangdao (China)
- Coordinates (People's Square): 39°56′26″N 119°35′42″E
- Country: People's Republic of China
- Province: Hebei
- Settled: 1737
- Established: March 3, 1983
- Municipal seat: Haigang District

Government
  - Party Secretary: Meng Xiangwei
  - Mayor: Zhang Ruishu

Area
  - Prefecture-level city: 7,791.57 km^{2} (3,008.34 sq mi)
  - Urban: 2,122.9 km^{2} (819.7 sq mi)
  - Metro: 2,122.9 km^{2} (819.7 sq mi)

Population (2020 census)
  - Prefecture-level city: 3,136,879
  - Density: 402.599/km^{2} (1,042.73/sq mi)
  - Urban: 1,881,047
  - Urban density: 886.07/km^{2} (2,294.9/sq mi)
  - Metro: 1,881,047
  - Metro density: 886.07/km^{2} (2,294.9/sq mi)

GDP
  - Prefecture-level city: CN¥ 184 billion US$ 22.2 billion
  - Per capita: CN¥ 48,230; US$7,143
- Time zone: UTC+8 (China Standard)
- Postal code: 066000
- Area code: (0)335
- ISO 3166 code: CN-HE-03
- Licence Plate Prefix: 冀C
- Website: www.qhd.gov.cn

Qinhuangdao
- "Qinhuangdao", as written in Simplified Chinese (top) and Traditional Chinese (bottom)
- Simplified Chinese: 秦皇岛
- Traditional Chinese: 秦皇島
- Literal meaning: Qin Shi Huang Island
Transcriptions
Standard Mandarin
- Hanyu Pinyin: Qínhuángdǎo
- Wade–Giles: Ch'in-huang-tao

Qinhuangdao (/ˈtʃɪnˈhwɑːŋˈdaʊ/; Chinese: 秦皇岛) is a port city on the coast of China in northern Hebei. It is administratively a prefecture-level city, about 300 km (190 mi) east of Beijing, on the Bohai Sea, the innermost gulf of the Yellow Sea. Its population during the 2020 national census was 3,136,879, with 1,881,047 people living in the built-up (or 'metro') area made up of four urban districts.At the end of 2024, the total resident population of the city was 3,111,400, an increase of 0.4 thousand over the end of the previous year. Among them, the resident population of urban areas is 2,078,120.

== History ==
The city's name "Qinhuangdao" literally means "Qin Emperor island", and is allegedly originated from the legend that the Jieshishan Scenic Area in Changli County was the site of First Emperor of Qin's famous ritual during his fourth and final survey tour to the east (东巡) in 210 BC. The "island" refers to the Nanshan area of the Port of Qinhuangdao at the southern edge of the city's Haigang District, which used to be a small offshore island until the late Qing dynasty, when dumping of dredged silt joined it to the mainland after the Guangxu Emperor approved the port's construction in the late 19th century.

In the 19th century, Qinhuangdao included the separate towns of Qinhuangdao and Tanghe. (Note: simplified Chinese: 汤河; traditional Chinese: 湯河; pinyin: Tānghé; Wade–Giles: Tang-ho; lit. 'soup river') Both were stations along the Peking–Mukden Railway. The design and construction of the new harbour and port of Ching Wang Tao in the Gulf of Pechili was undertaken by the partnership of Sir John Wolfe-Barry and Lt Col Arthur John Barry at the turn of the 20th century.

At the beginning of the Chinese Civil War, Du Yuming's National Revolutionary Army forces landed in the city at the beginning of the Nationalist government's offensive against the Chinese Communist Party in Soviet-occupied Manchuria. They were unable to land further north because other ports were either occupied by the Soviet Union or already garrisoned by the military forces which would become the People's Liberation Army.

Qinhuangdao Olympic Sports Center Stadium was used as one of the soccer venues during the 2008 Summer Olympics.

== Geography ==
Qinhuangdao sits on the northwest coast of the Bohai Sea and borders Tangshan to the southwest, Chengde to the northwest, and Liaoning to the northeast. Its administrative area ranges in latitude 39° 24' to 40° 37' N and in longitude from 118° 33' to 119° 51' E, and has a total area of 7,812.4 km^{2} (3,016.4 sq mi).

Since the elevation of Tianjin to a provincial-level municipality, Qinhuangdao is the chief port of Hebei. The Qin emperor Qin Shi Huang is said to have sought immortality on an island in Haigang District but did not find it.

Qinhuangdao has three main developed areas:

- Beidaihe: A summer seaside resort for senior government officials. Many political decisions affecting China are made here, making it the equivalent to resorts in Maine or Camp David in Maryland, United States.
- Haigang: the harbor city. Qinhuangdao proper. Home of Yan Shan University, the leading university in NE Hebei province.
- Shanhaiguan: a popular tourist destination, featuring the eastern end of the Great Wall.

Qinhuangdao's Olympic Sports Centre Stadium was used as an Olympic Competition Venue (Football Preliminary) during the 2008 Summer Olympics.

=== Climate ===
Qinhuangdao has a monsoon-influenced humid continental climate (Köppen Dwa), with four distinct seasons. Winters are cold and dry due to the Siberian high, which often causes winds to blow in from the northwest, minimising the oceanic influence: the monthly daily average temperature in January is −5.6 °C (21.9 °F), colder than Beijing's −2.7 °C (27.1 °F). Summers are hot and humid due to the East Asian Monsoon, often allowing onshore flows; summer is also when the coast moderates the weather the most: the average temperature in July here is 24.7 °C (76.5 °F), as compared to 27.2 °C (81.0 °F) in Beijing. As measured by daily mean temperature, July and August are equally warm, averaging 24.7 °C (76.5 °F). The annual mean is 10.6 °C (51.1 °F), and 70% of the annual precipitation falls from June to August. Extreme temperatures have ranged from −26.0 °C (−14.8 °F) on 6 January 2010 to 40.0 °C (104.0 °F) on 15 June 2017.

Climate data for Qinhuangdao, elevation 2 m (6.6 ft), (1991–2020 normals, extremes 1951–present)
Month	Jan	Feb	Mar	Apr	May	Jun	Jul	Aug	Sep	Oct	Nov	Dec	Year
Record high °C (°F)	12.7 (54.9)	18.3 (64.9)	29.1 (84.4)	28.6 (83.5)	37.1 (98.8)	40.0 (104.0)	39.2 (102.6)	36.3 (97.3)	34.2 (93.6)	29.5 (85.1)	22.6 (72.7)	14.8 (58.6)	40.0 (104.0)
Mean daily maximum °C (°F)	0.1 (32.2)	2.9 (37.2)	9.2 (48.6)	16.4 (61.5)	22.4 (72.3)	25.5 (77.9)	28.3 (82.9)	28.5 (83.3)	25.3 (77.5)	18.6 (65.5)	9.7 (49.5)	2.3 (36.1)	15.8 (60.4)
Daily mean °C (°F)	−5.6 (21.9)	−2.7 (27.1)	3.7 (38.7)	11.0 (51.8)	17.3 (63.1)	21.3 (70.3)	24.7 (76.5)	24.4 (75.9)	19.8 (67.6)	12.4 (54.3)	3.9 (39.0)	−3.1 (26.4)	10.6 (51.0)
Mean daily minimum °C (°F)	−10.6 (12.9)	−7.5 (18.5)	−1.3 (29.7)	6.1 (43.0)	12.3 (54.1)	17.5 (63.5)	21.5 (70.7)	20.6 (69.1)	14.8 (58.6)	6.9 (44.4)	−1.0 (30.2)	−7.7 (18.1)	6.0 (42.7)
Record low °C (°F)	−26.0 (−14.8)	−19.3 (−2.7)	−16.3 (2.7)	−5.0 (23.0)	3.0 (37.4)	7.3 (45.1)	14.2 (57.6)	11.4 (52.5)	2.7 (36.9)	−6.4 (20.5)	−14.1 (6.6)	−18.8 (−1.8)	−26.0 (−14.8)
Average precipitation mm (inches)	2.6 (0.10)	4.3 (0.17)	7.9 (0.31)	24.4 (0.96)	47.6 (1.87)	86.3 (3.40)	171.2 (6.74)	163.9 (6.45)	47.0 (1.85)	28.1 (1.11)	15.0 (0.59)	3.6 (0.14)	601.9 (23.69)
Average precipitation days (≥ 0.1 mm)	1.6	2.1	2.9	5.4	6.9	10.1	11.3	9.3	6.6	4.6	3.9	2.0	66.7
Average snowy days	2.8	2.4	1.6	0.3	0	0	0	0	0	0.1	1.6	2.6	11.4
Average relative humidity (%)	54	56	56	58	64	77	83	81	73	65	58	54	65
Mean monthly sunshine hours	189.3	187.4	235.4	243.5	262.0	218.2	188.4	209.9	221.6	204.7	174.7	178.5	2,513.6
Percentage possible sunshine	63	62	63	61	59	49	42	50	60	60	59	62	58
Source 1: China Meteorological Administration
Source 2: Weather China

== Administrative divisions ==
Map
Name	Chinese	Pinyin	Population (2020)	Area (km^{2})	Density (/km^{2})
Urban
Haigang District	海港区	Hǎigǎng Qū	1,024,876	754.3	4,166
Suburban
Shanhaiguan District	山海关区	Shānhǎiguān Qū	164,989	205.8	855
Beidaihe District	北戴河区	Běidàihé Qū	130,104	158.1	822.9
Funing District	抚宁区	Fǔníng Qū	291,211	1,039	352.2
Rural
Changli County	昌黎县	Chānglí Xiàn	487,989	1,228	397.4
Lulong County	卢龙县	Lúlóng Xiàn	333,942	959.0	348.2
Qinglong Manchu Autonomous County	青龙满族自治县	Qīnglóng Mǎnzú Zìzhìxiàn	431,138	3,508	122.9

== Development Zone ==
The Qinhuangdao Economic & Technology Development Zone was approved by the State Council of the People's Republic of China in 1984 to become one of China's first state-level economic and technological development zones. Qinhuangdao is in the heart of the rapidly growing "Bohai-Rim Economic Circle", in easy reach of Beijing (280 km (170 mi)) and Tianjin (245 km (152 mi)). It covers a sea area of 23.81 km^{2} (9.19 sq mi) and has a coastline of 6 km (3.7 mi). The planned and controlled area of the development zone has reached 56.72 km^{2} (21.90 sq mi). By the end of 2006, the number of approved projects reached 4,546, in which 647 projects were foreign-invested, with a total investment of US$4.73 billion.

Qinhuangdao Export Processing Zone is the first export processing zone in Hebei Province. It passed joint appraisal held by the General Administration of Customs, the State Development Planning Commission, and other six departments in 2003. Industries encouraged in the zone include electronics assembly and manufacturing, building/construction materials, computer software, trading and distribution.

== Economy ==
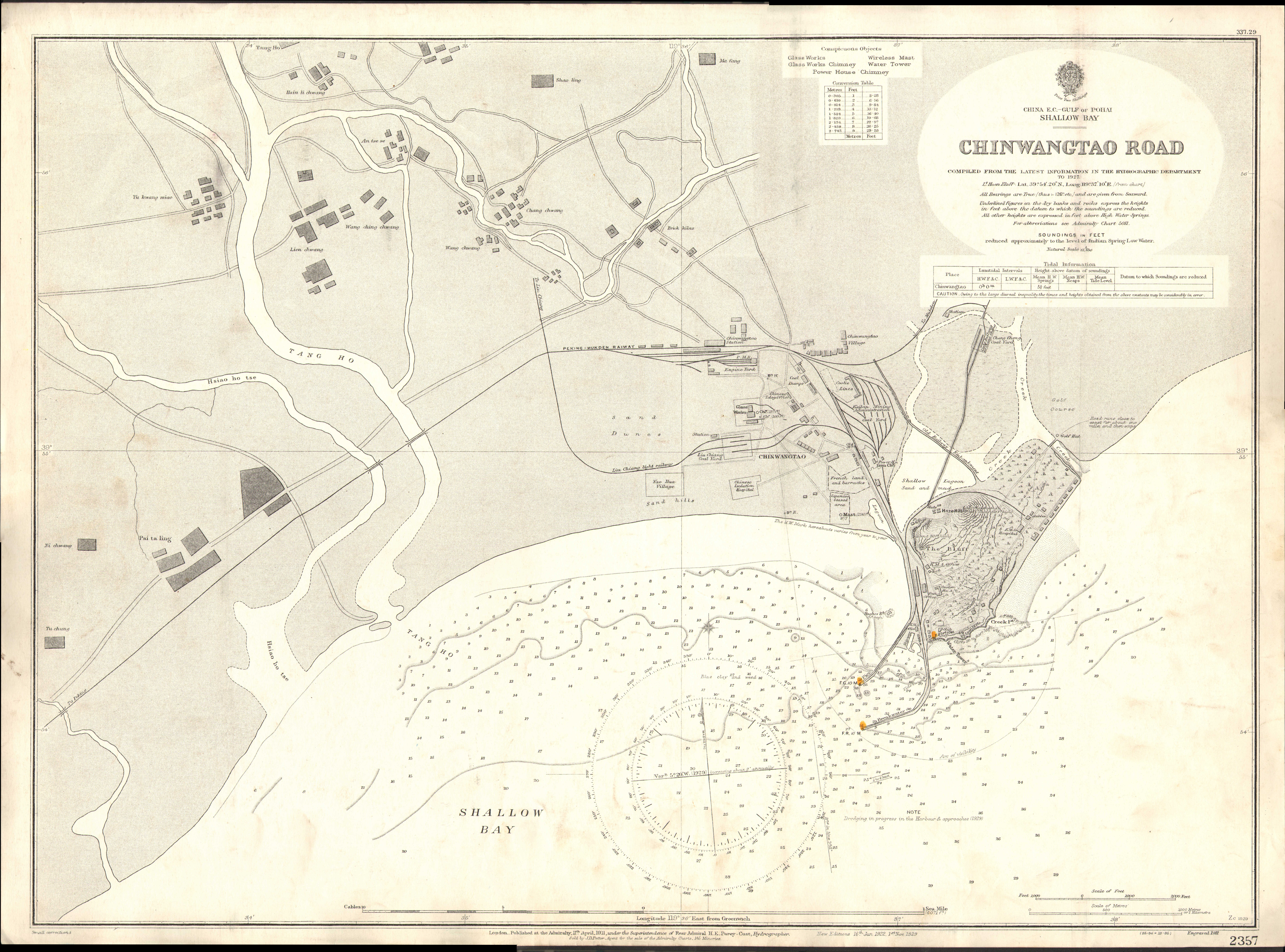
1929 nautical chart of Qinhuangdao, showing the Pekiing-Mukden railway and the coal yards.

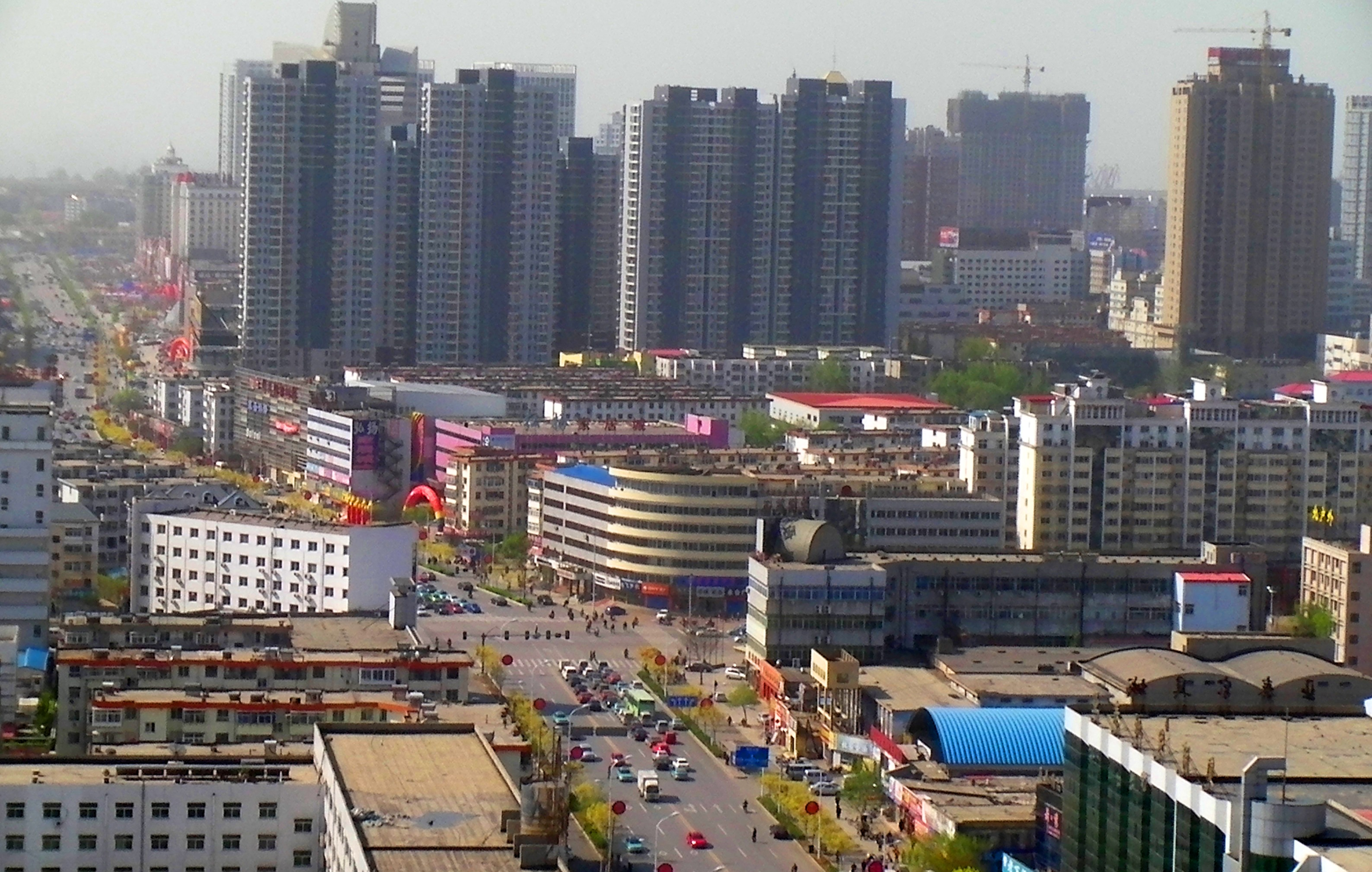
Looking south along Minzu Road from the top floor of the International Trade Hotel

Qinhuangdao Port is a strategically important port and is the largest coal shipping port in the country, much of which is shipped to power plants elsewhere in China. With recent expansion, its capacity has reached 209 million metric tons. The harbor is adding a further six berths to add capacity and is increasingly being invested in by other port operators, such as South Africa's Port of Richards Bay, who have announced plans to invest US$150 million to increase capacity by at least 28 percent.

China is the world's third largest coal exporter, and Qinhuangdao is expected to handle much of the nation's coal exports. Rail links from Shanxi (China's largest coal producer) to Qinhuangdao Port are being upgraded, which should allow for Qinhuangdao to ultimately increase its throughput to 400 million tonnes of coal per annum from its current level of about 250 million tons by 2015. In 2018, the updated railway reached a record annual throughput of 451 million tons.

Other Chinese and foreign service suppliers are moving to Qinhuangdao to support this. China Ocean Shipping (Group) Co, China's biggest shipping company, expects US$49 billion of spending on ports over the next five years as the industry tackles bottlenecks created by the nation's unprecedented economic boom.

Qinhuangdao is on the Jingshen Expressway which links Beijing with Shenyang, Liaoning. The city is served by Qinhuangdao Beidaihe Airport.

== Tourism ==
The Qinhuangdao Wildlife Park was opened in 1995 and is China's second largest wildlife park.

== Red Ribbon ==
Qinhuangdao is home to the Tanghe River Park, which features the Red Ribbon, a knee-high steel sculpture that runs the length of the park, providing seating, environmental interpretation, lighting, and the display of native plants. The project has won an honor award from the American Society of Landscape Architects and was selected by readers of Condé Nast Traveler magazine as one of the seven new wonders of the architecture world.

== Education ==
- Yanshan University
- Northeastern University at Qinhuangdao
- Hebei Institute of International Business and Economics
- Hebei Normal University of Science and Technology
- Northeastern Petroleum University at Qinhuangdao

== Sister cities ==
- Lugo, Galicia, Spain
- Pesaro, Marche, Italy
- Toledo, Ohio, United States, since 1985
- Honolulu, Hawaii, United States, since May 5, 2010
- Terrace, British Columbia, Canada, since November 30, 2015
