= Elective (medical) =

Students assisting surgery in a hospital affiliated with Hebei North University.

An elective (Note: Sometimes known by other names, such as a Subject to Endorsement Placement (StEP) at Manchester Medical School.) is a placement undertaken as part of a medical degree. The content and setting of the placement are largely decided by the student undertaking it, with some students choosing to spend it in a different country.

Elective placements are not exclusive to medical degrees; many other degree programmes within the field of healthcare also incorporate electives (such as nursing, dentistry and physiotherapy) and the format is often the same.

== Motivations ==
An elective represents a unique opportunity for medical students to experience healthcare in a setting unfamiliar to that in which they are accustomed to studying, or in a place or field of specific interest. This is classically in a low resource setting, but may also be to experience a specialist field, a place the student is considering working in the future, or for a variety of other reasons.

Placements abroad may provide experience of differing practices, but also allow students to encounter medical conditions they are less used to seeing at home. (Note: For example, certain infectious diseases that are uncommon in the Western world but common elsewhere.) In addition, students often retrospectively describe how their placements broadened their horizons with regards to the social issues affecting healthcare in developing countries.

A placement in a particular specialist setting may allow students insight into a potential career path, or allow students to participate in the research or implementation of new treatments or practices.

== Structure and organisation ==
An elective is usually undertaken in the penultimate or final year of study of a medical degree, often after students have finished their final exams. The university usually specifies the dates during which an elective can be undertaken by students.

Electives are usually entirely self-arranged, with the student organising travel, accommodation, the placement itself, and other aspects like travel insurance and indemnity insurance. Often the hospital will help organise accommodation, and indemnity cover may be automatic depending on the student's existing policy. Some students recruit the services of companies which specialise in organising medical electives. Students often share their experiences on the internet, and good placements become well-known. Popular destinations can fill up 12 months in advance or more

=== Cost ===
Most students need to cover travel and living costs, many needing to cover accommodation, and some are charged administration or tuition costs, which can be up to $1,000 or more.

Many students fund their electives personally, but financial help is occasionally available in the forms of bursaries, prizes or scholarships, either from the student's university or from societies or private companies. In these cases, the sponsor may require that the student undertakes some form of project whilst on their elective to justify the expense.

== Requirements ==
Requirements of students vary from medical school to medical school. Some (such as Aberdeen) require students to submit a written project as part of their placement, whereas other institutions utilise few formal assessments.

Students are still subject to all the ethical and professional requirements they would be at their home institution, such as the GMC's requirement that students at British medical schools "recognise and work within the limits of their competence". It is immoral and illegal for unregistered medical students to work as if doctors, despite the fact that their level of skill and expertise is often comparable to the professionals they will work with on the placement.
