= Hebei North University =

Public college in Zhangjiakou, Hebei, China

- 河北北方学院
- Motto: 厚德、远志、笃学、创新
- Type: Public
- Established: 2003
- Faculty: 1,568
- Students: 25,000+
- Postgraduates: 1,500+
- Location: 11 Zuanshi South Road, Zhangjiakou, Hebei, China
- Campus: West (Main), East, South, and North Campus
- Website: www.hebeinu.edu.cn

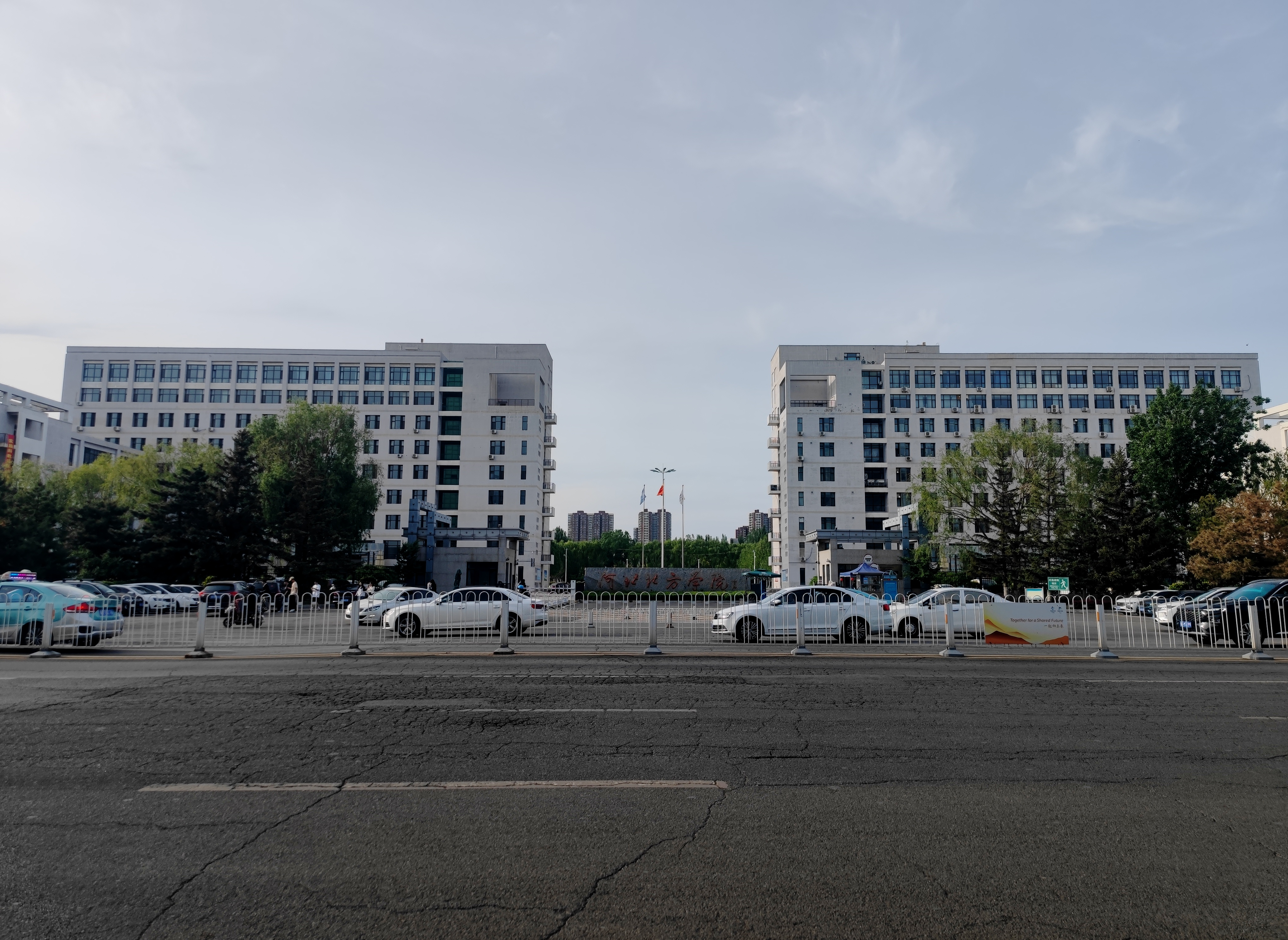
West Campus South Gate

Hebei North University (abbreviated as HBNU or HebeiNU; Chinese: 河北北方学院, Héběi Běifāng Xuéyuàn) is a public, multi-disciplinary university located in Zhangjiakou, Hebei Province, China. It is administered by the provincial government of Hebei.

The university was established in May 2003 following approval by the Ministry of Education. It was formed through the merger of three institutions:

- Zhangjiakou Medical College (1946)
- Zhangjiakou Teachers College (1956)
- Zhangjiakou Advanced Post-secondary Agriculture School (1954)

Hebei North University is the only comprehensive university in the northern part of Hebei Province.

== Academic Departments ==
The university comprises the following teaching departments:

- Basic Medical College
- College of Medical Laboratory
- Traditional Chinese Medicine
- Department of Pharmacy
- Department of Literature
- College of Science
- School of Economics and Management
- School of Foreign Languages
- College of Fine Arts
- School of Information Science and Engineering
- College of Law and Politics
- College of Animal Science and Technology
- College of Agriculture and Forestry Science and Technology
- College of Continuing Studies
- First Clinical Medical College
- Second Clinical Medical College
- Third Clinical Medical College
- Public Physical Education Department
- Department of Marxist Theory Education
- Academy for Performing Arts
- International Education College

In addition, the university includes three other teaching departments, two scientific research centers, eight affiliated teaching institutions, and an International Center.

== Campus and Facilities ==
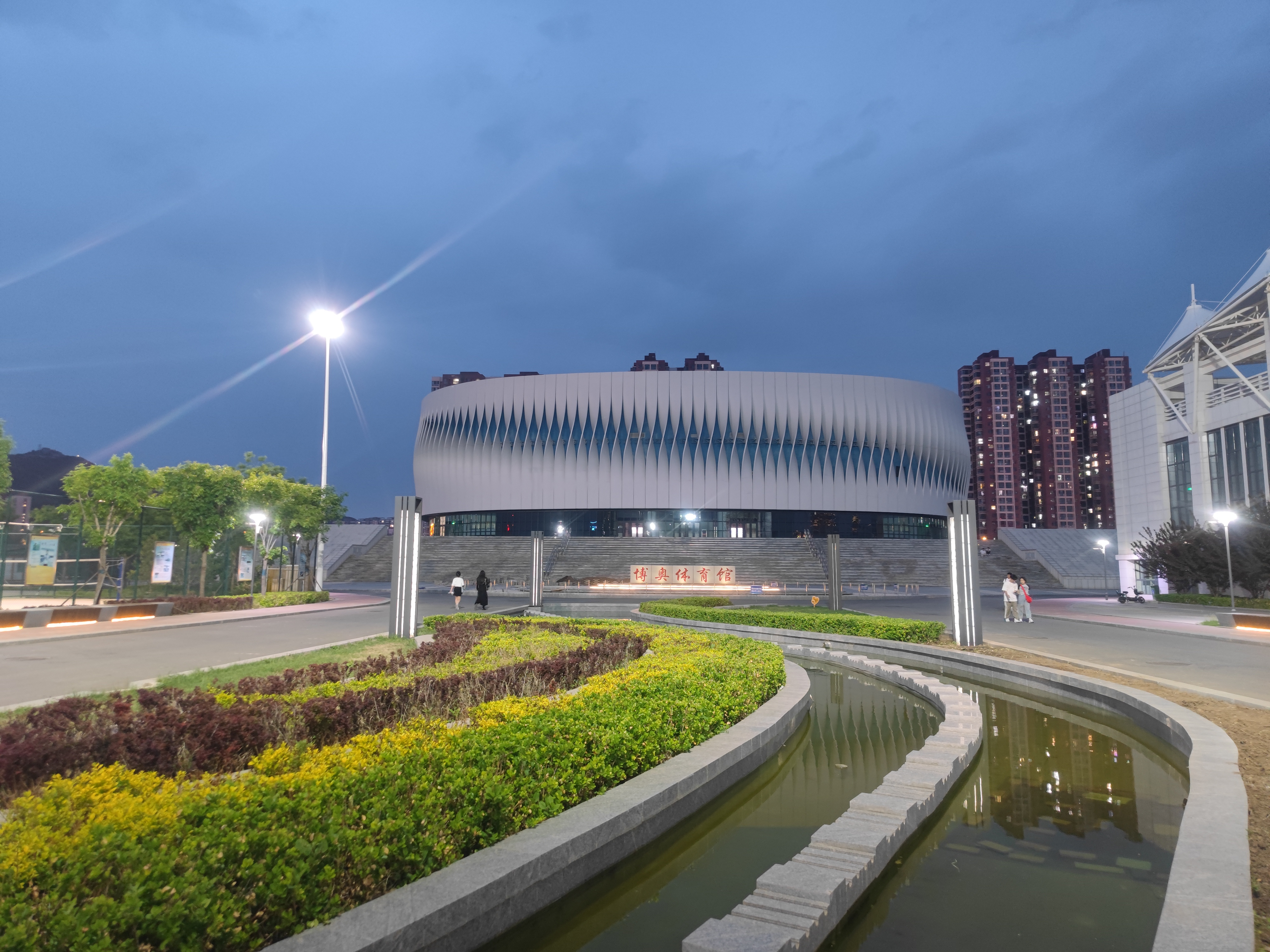
Boao Gymnasium

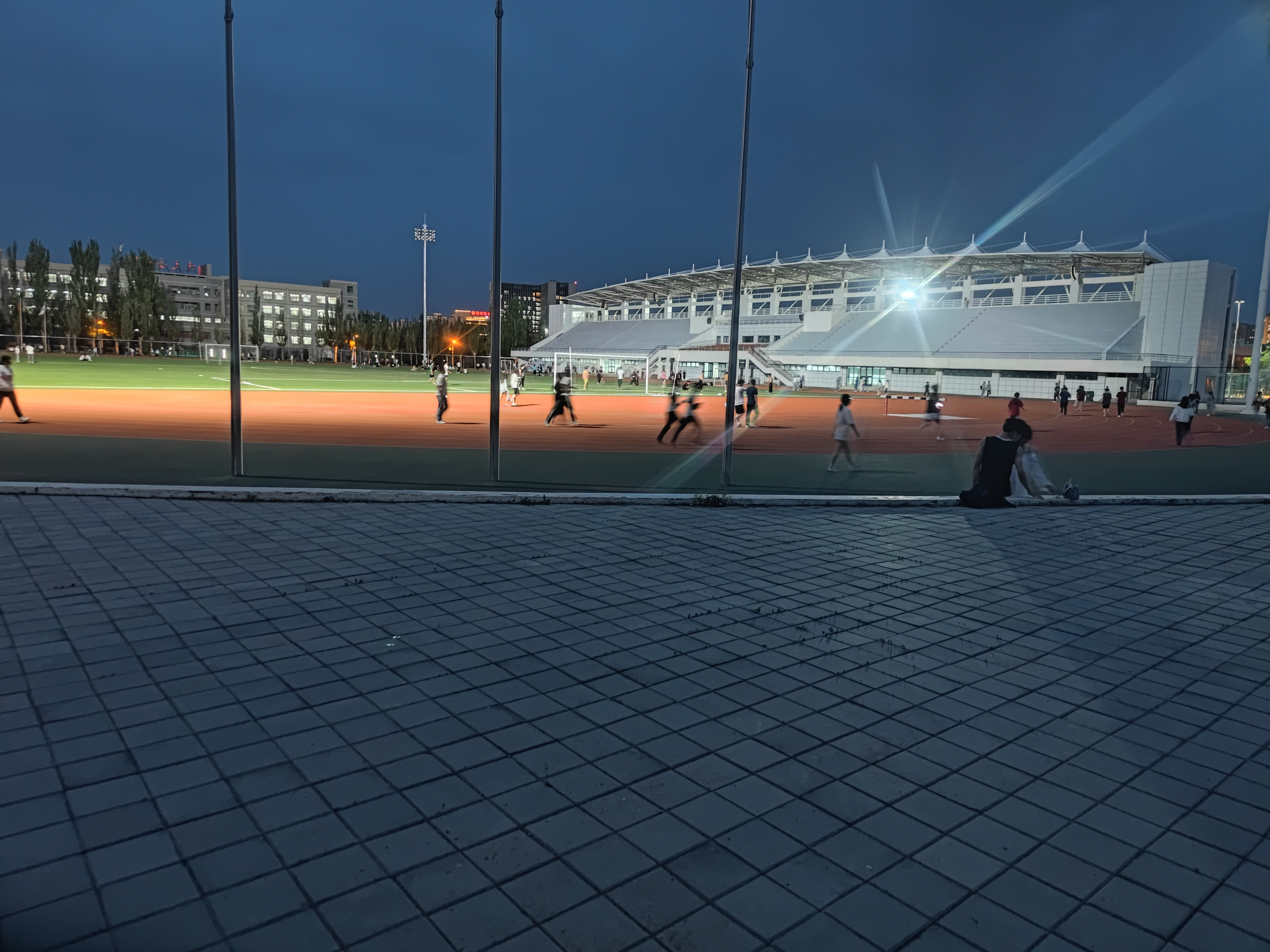
West Campus Playground

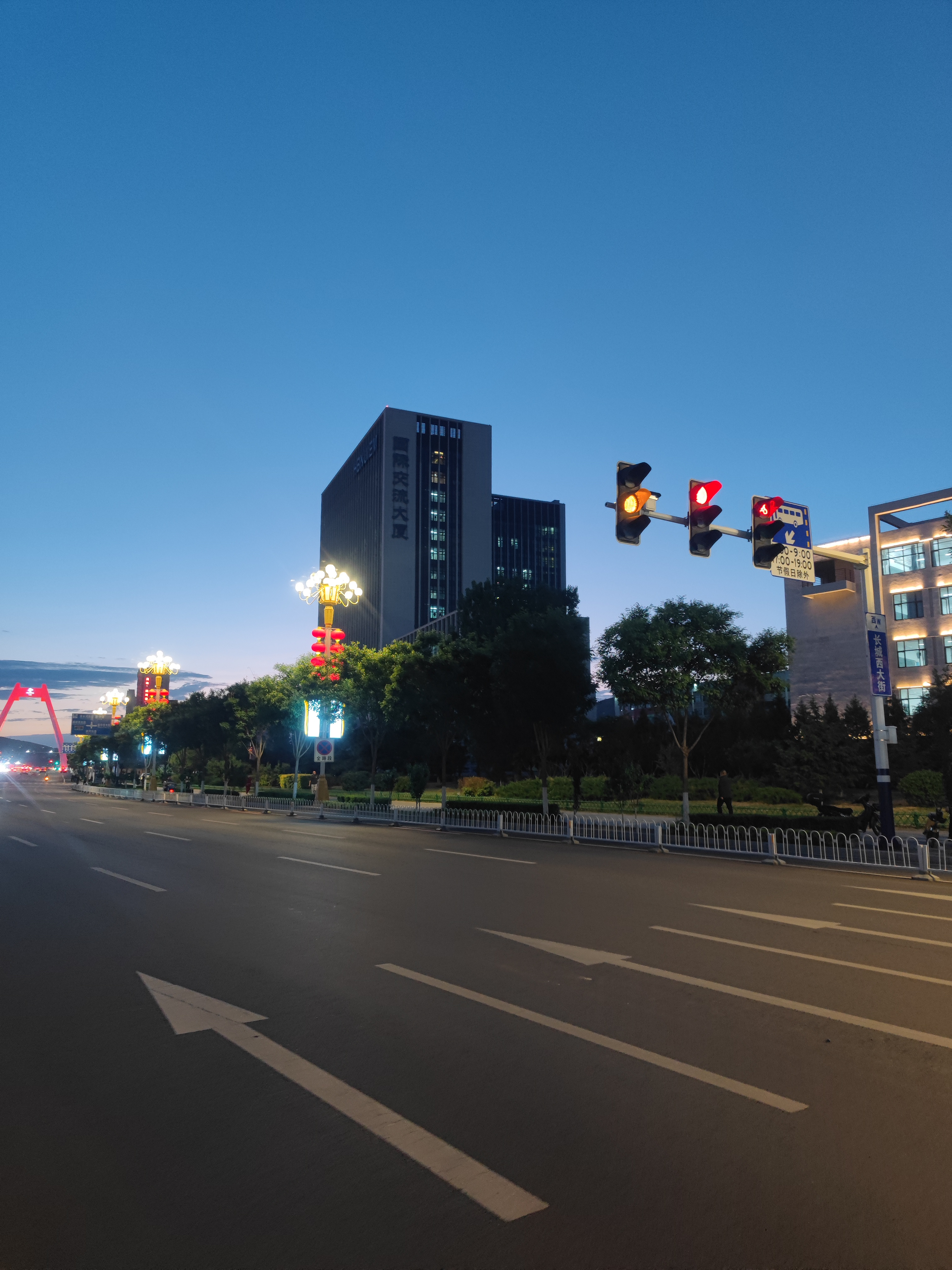
International Exchange Building

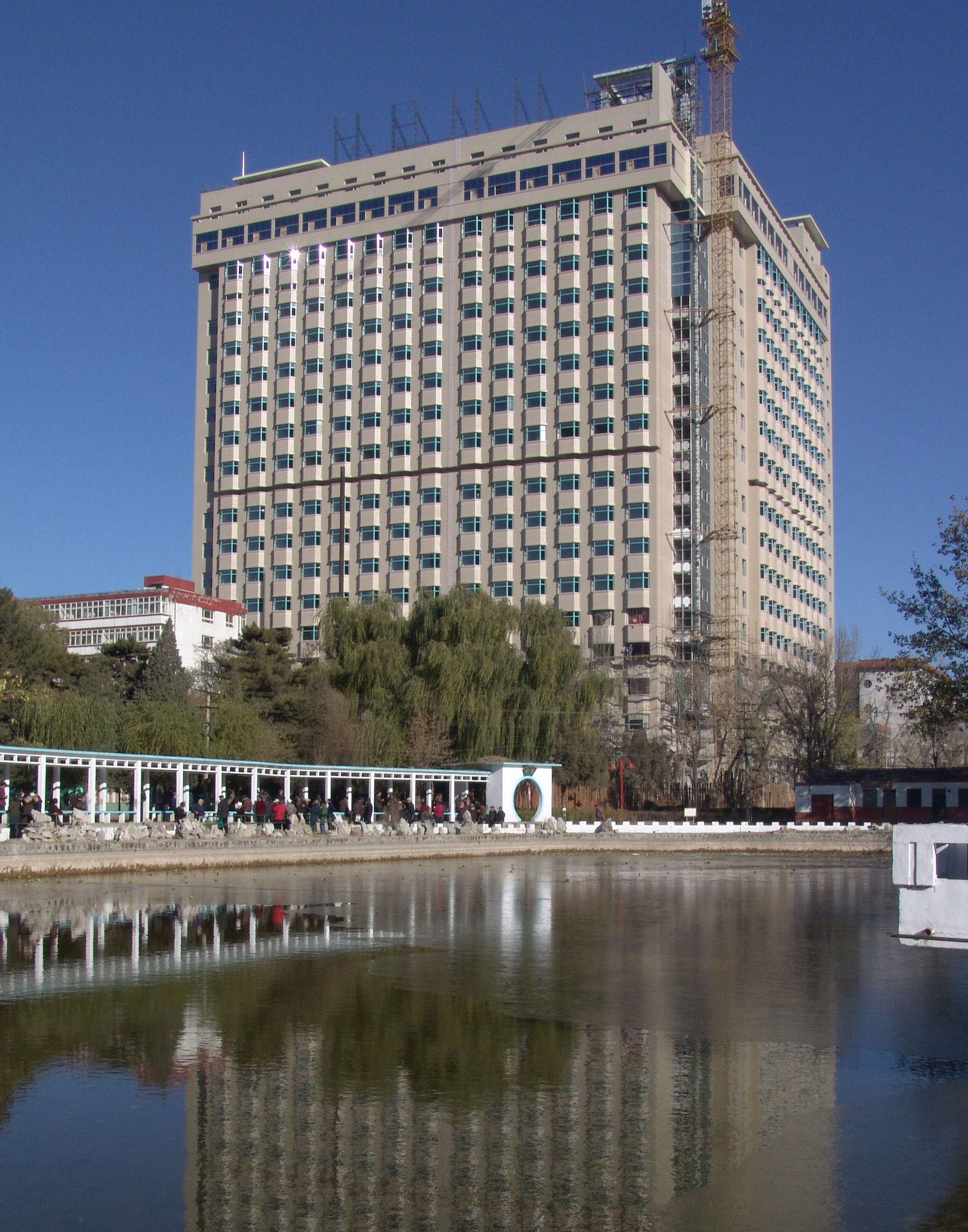
First Affiliated Hospital

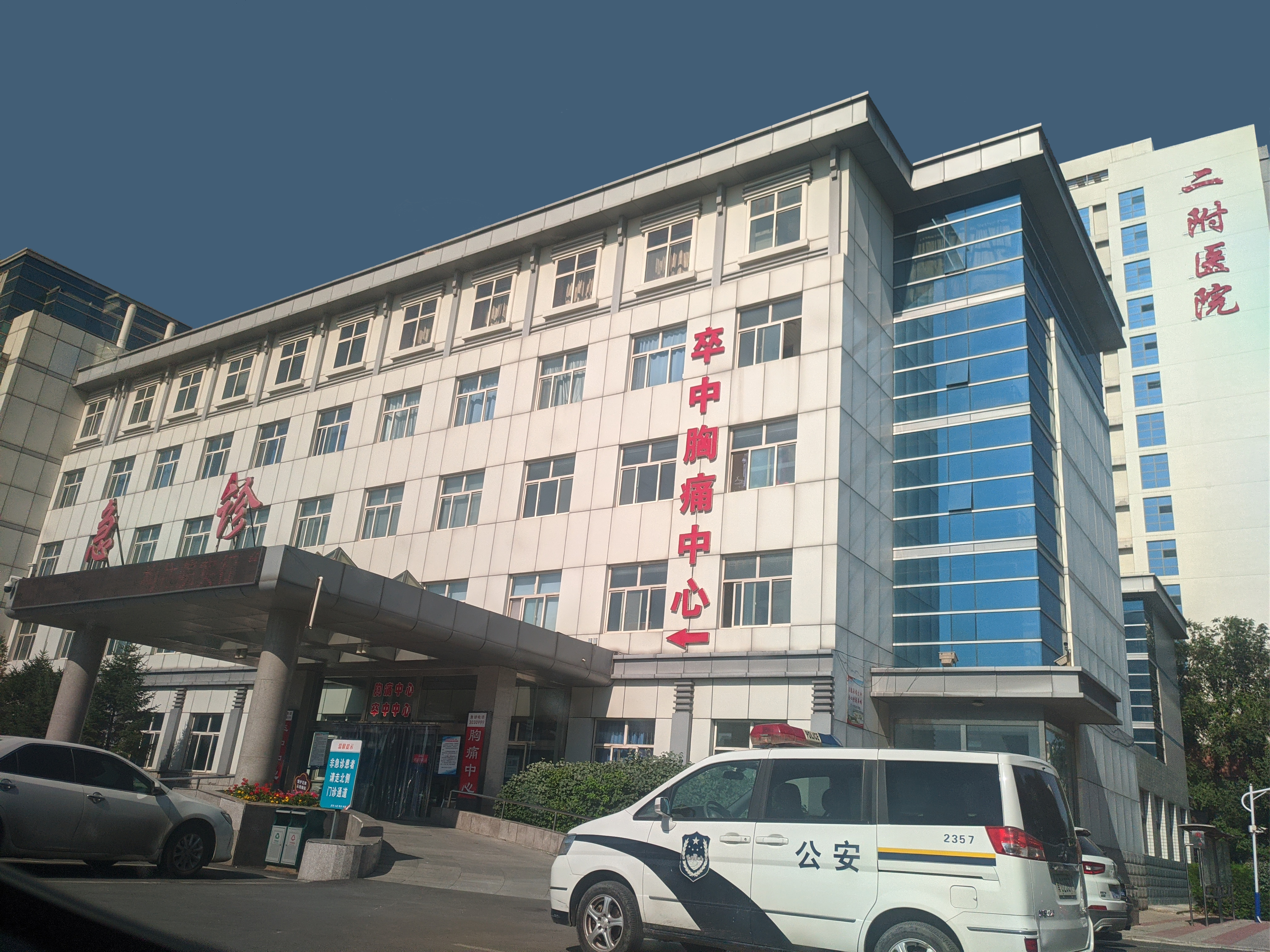
Second Affiliated Hospital
